= Rail transport in Indonesia =

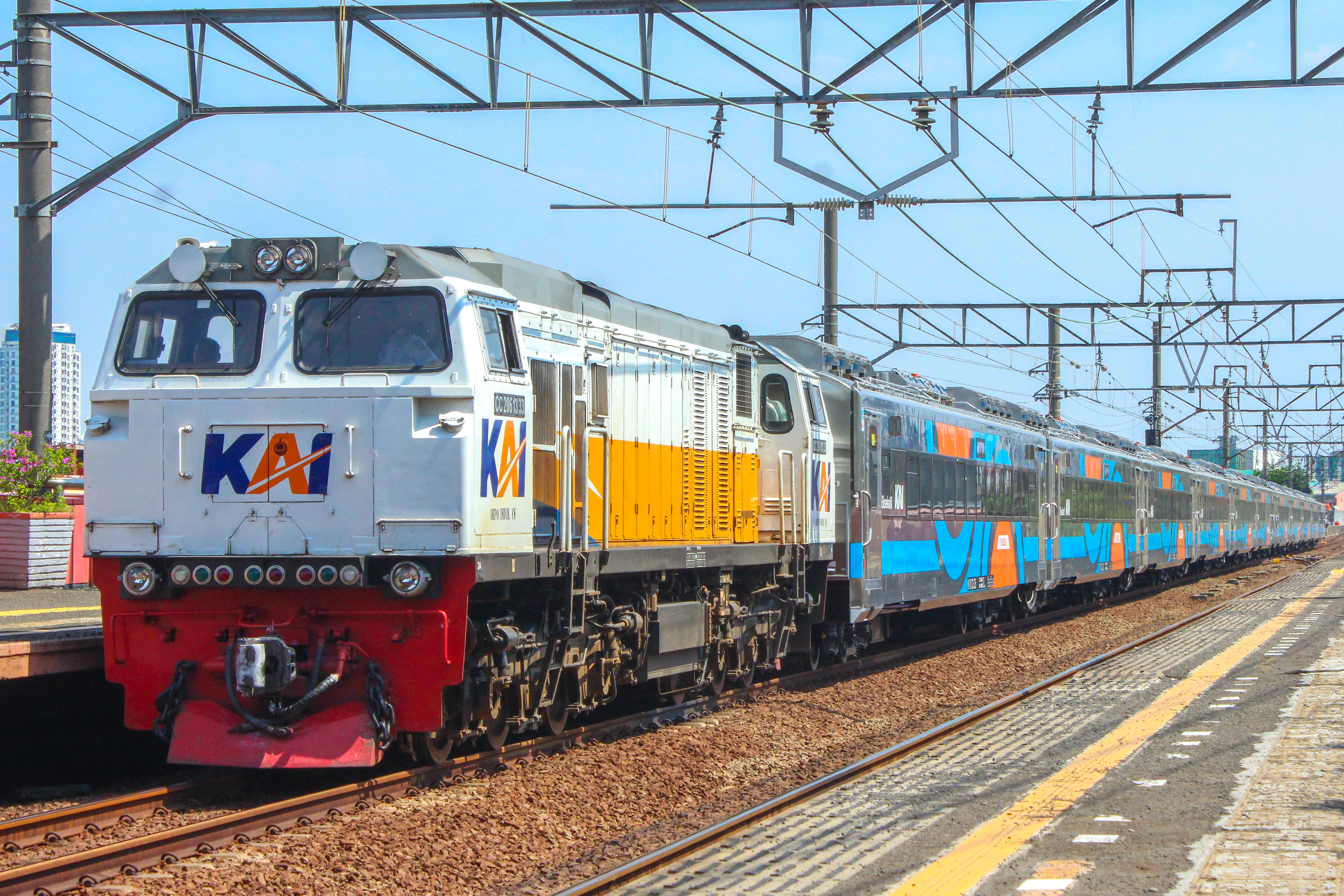
- Taksaka train in Gambir station

Operation
- National railway: Kereta Api Indonesia

Statistics
- Ridership: Kereta Api Indonesia; 453.3 million (2024); MRT Jakarta; 40.8 million (2024); Whoosh; 6 million (2024)
- Passenger-distance: Kereta Api Indonesia; 28.7 million
- Freight: 69.2 million tonnes

System length
- Total: 8,260 kilometres (5,130 mi)
- Electrified: 621 kilometres (386 mi)

Track gauge
- Main: 1,067 mm (3 ft 6 in)
- Standard gauge 1,435 mm (4 ft 8 1/2 in): 107.7 kilometres (66.9 mi)

Electrification
- Main: 1.5 kV DC overhead line, 25 kV AC 50 Hz overhead line, 750 V DC third rail

Features
- Longest tunnel: KCIC Tunnel#6 (active); 4,478 m (14,692 ft)
- Longest bridge: Serayu Maos Bridge; 360 m (1,180 ft)
- Max elevation: 848 m (2,782 ft); 1,246 m (4,088 ft) at Nagreg railway station (active); Cikajang railway station (inactive)
- Min elevation: 1 m (3 ft 3 in) at Surabaya Pasar Turi railway station

The majority of Indonesia's railways are located on the island of Java and carry both passengers and freight. Sumatra has four discontinuous railway networks, serving Aceh, North Sumatra, West Sumatra, South Sumatra and Lampung. One operational line is located in South Sulawesi.

Indonesia has developed plans for a national railway network, under which an additional 3,200 kilometres (2,000 mi) of track would be constructed across Sumatra, Java, Kalimantan and Sulawesi. The project has been described as the country's largest railway undertaking since it gained independence from the Netherlands in 1945. Indonesia intends to extend the national railway network to 10,524 kilometres (6,539 mi) by 2030. As of September 2022, the network covered 7,032 kilometres (4,369 mi).

Commuter railways operate in metropolitan areas across Java, notably in Jakarta, and in Medan, North Sumatra. Mass rapid transit and light rail transit systems have also been introduced in Jakarta and Palembang, South Sumatra.

Although road vehicles in Indonesia travel on the left, most trains operate on the right, a legacy of Dutch colonial rule.

Most Indonesian railways use 1,067 mm (3 ft 6 in) gauge, although 1,435 mm (4 ft 8 1/2 in), 750 mm (2 ft 5 1/2 in) and 600 mm (1 ft 11 5/8 in) gauges have also been used. Newer lines in Sumatra, including Aceh, and in Kalimantan, Sulawesi and Papua use 1,435 mm gauge. The Jabodebek LRT, Jakarta LRT, and Jakarta-Bandung HSR also use this gauge. Most electrified lines in the Jakarta metropolitan area use 1,500 V DC overhead electrification.

Indonesia's railways are operated primarily by the state-owned Kereta Api Indonesia (KAI), its commuter subsidiary KAI Commuter and its airport rail subsidiary KAI Bandara. Most railway infrastructure is owned by the Directorate General of Railways of the Ministry of Transportation. Railway operators pay track-access charges to use the railway infrastructure.

Various narrow gauge industrial tramways operate in Java and Sumatra, serving the sugarcane and oil palm industries.

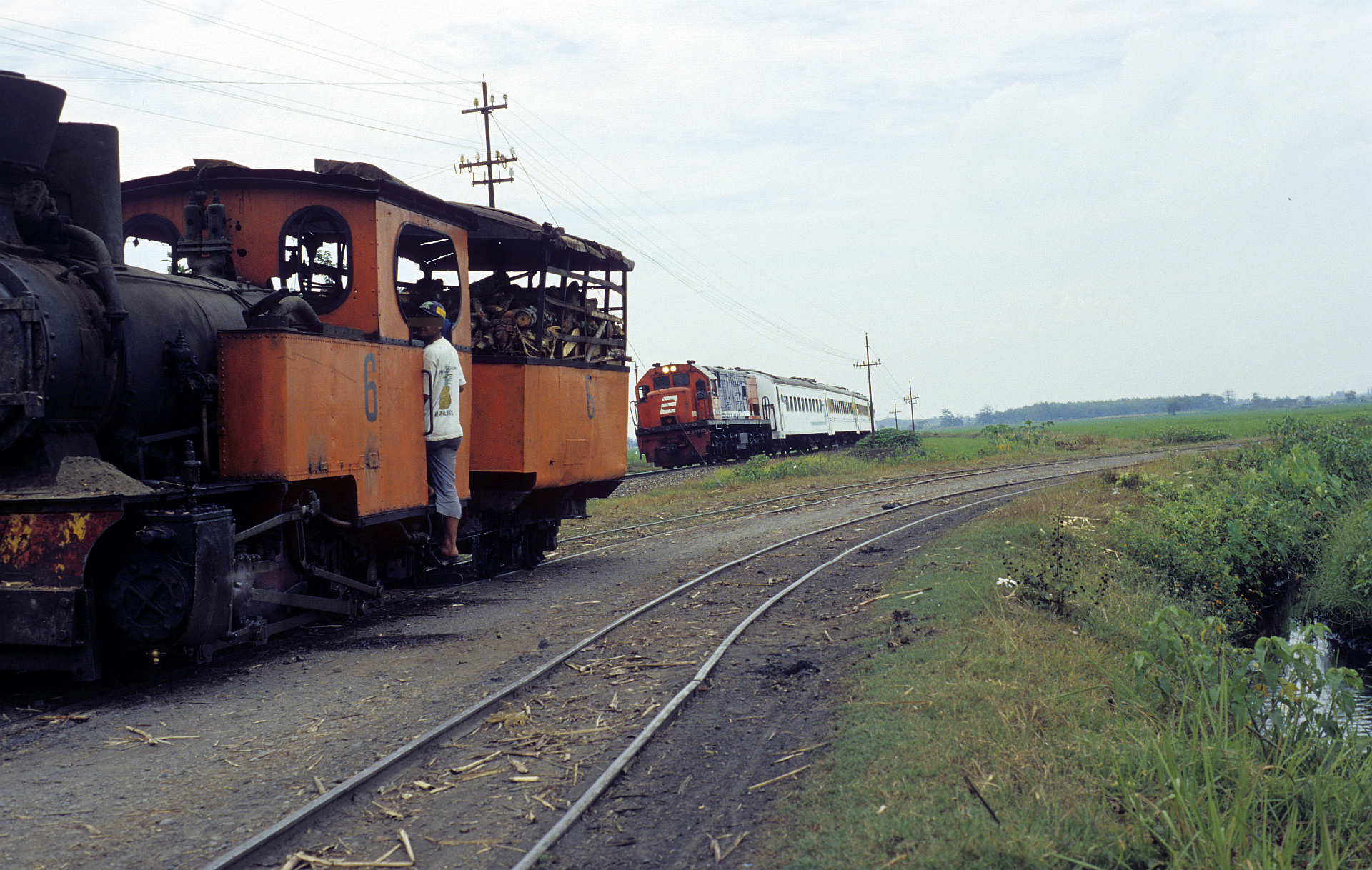
A sugarcane locomotive owned by PG Tersana Baru alongside a regular train operated by Perumka

== History ==
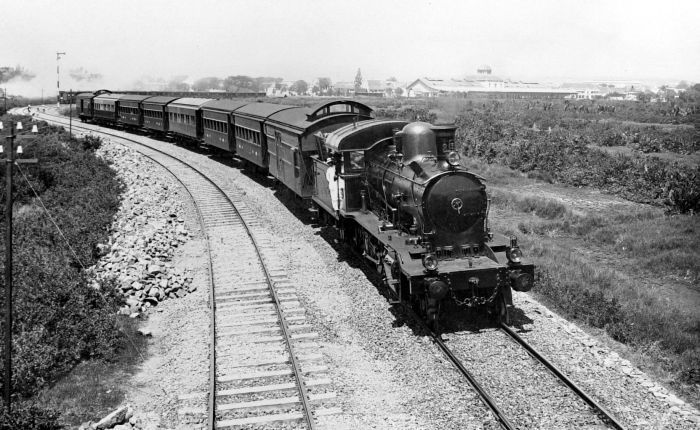
Locomotive and train of the Dutch Indies Railway Company (Nederlands-Indische Spoorweg Maatschappij), Java, c. 1900s.

The first railway line in Indonesia opened in 1867 and was initially laid to standard gauge size. The railways were gradually expanded by both the state and private companies.

=== Pre-Independence ===
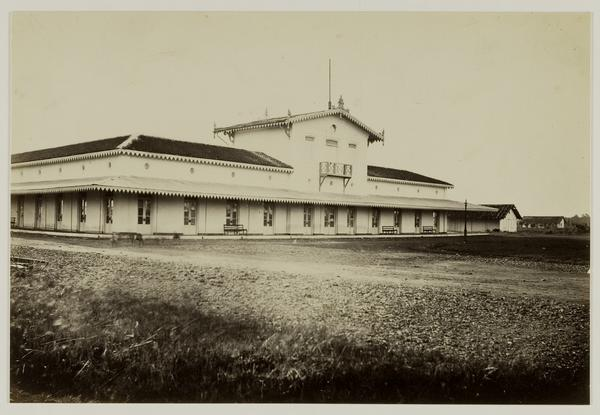
Semarang Station, the first railway station in Indonesia.

The idea of building a railway in Indonesia emerged in the 1840s. Construction was initially proposed at the request of King Willem I for military purposes in Semarang and to facilitate the transport of agricultural products to warehouses in the city. The proposal was realised with the establishment of the Nederlandsch-Indische Spoorweg Maatschappij (NIS), which was incorporated on 27 August 1863. Railways in the Dutch East Indies were built primarily to facilitate the transport of agricultural products.

Construction of the first railway began with a groundbreaking ceremony on 17 June 1864 in Kemijen, East Semarang, at the site of Samarang Station (km 0), on the first section of the Samarang–Vorstenlanden (Yogyakarta) railway. The ceremony was led by the Governor-General of the Dutch East Indies, Mr. L.A.J.W. Sloet van de Beele. The line was completed on 10 August 1867.

Construction continued on the remaining sections of the line, connecting Tanggung, Gundih, Solo and Yogya NIS. A branch line was also built from Kedungjati to Ambarawa. The Samarang–Vorstenlanden line officially opened on 10 June 1872, and the initial network, comprising the Samarang–Vorstenlanden and Kedungjati–Willem I lines, was completed on 21 May 1873.

Horse trams began operating in the late 19th century. The Bataviasche Tramweg Maatschappij began operating a horse-drawn tramway in 1869, which became the forerunner of the Batavia tram network. The Solosche Tramweg Maatschappij began operating another horse-drawn tramway on the Purwosari–Boyolali line in 1892.

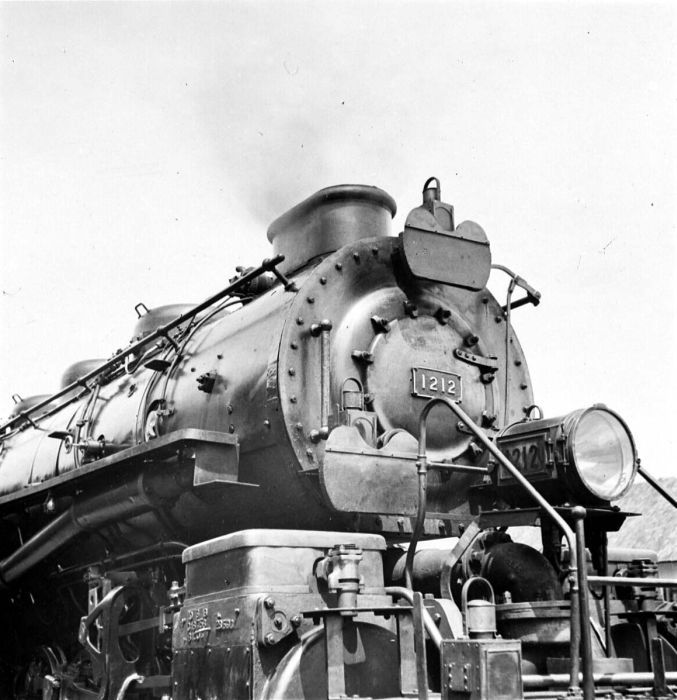
Locomotive DD51

The concession for the Batavia–Buitenzorg line was announced in the Gouvernementesbesluit of 26 March 1864, no. 1. Writing in the newspaper Kompas, Josef Osdar stated that the concession was implemented in 1869, five years after it had been granted. According to Osdar, the NIS intended to build the line to 1,435 mm (4 ft 8 1/2 in) gauge, while the colonial government favoured 1,067 mm (3 ft 6 in) gauge. The NIS reportedly sought to monopolise the transport of plantation products and connect the line with the Samarang–Vorstenlanden line. The Batavia–Koningsplein line began operating on 16 September 1871 using 1,067 mm (3 ft 6 in) gauge. The line was extended to Buitenzorg and operated on 31 January 1873.

The Staatsspoorwegen (SS), established by the colonial government in 1875, differed from the NIS. It was formed partly in response to the financial difficulties faced by the NIS. During this period, private companies also expressed interest in obtaining railway concessions, but generally favoured tramways because they were considered less expensive to construct. The SS was established to develop state railway lines in Java, beginning with the Surabaya–Pasuruan and Bangil–Malang. It adopted 1,067 mm (3 ft 6 in) gauge for the state-owned network. The SS also sought to extend the Batavia–Buitenzorg line through Bogor, Bandung, Banjar and Yogyakarta to East Java.

Railway networks in Sumatra developed separately. The Deli Spoorweg Maatschappij operated in North Sumatra, the Atjeh Tram operated in Aceh, the Staatsspoorwegen ter Sumatra's Westkust in West Sumatra and the Zuid-Sumatra Staatsspoorwegen in southern Sumatra. The Staatstramwegen op Celebes operated the railway in South Sulawesi. Plans to establish another Staatsspoorwegen division, the Staatstramwegen in Tapanoeli, were not implemented. By the end of the 1920s, feasibility studies had also been conducted for proposed railways in Kalimantan, North Sulawesi, Lombok and Bali.

By 31 December 1928, railways and tramways in the Dutch East Indies, including Sumatra, Java and Sulawesi, had a total length of 7,293 kilometres (4,532 mi). The network in Java and Madura comprised 5,473 kilometres (3,401 mi) of track: 2,802 kilometres (1,741 mi) of 1,067 mm (3 ft 6 in) railway, 205 kilometres (127 mi) of 1,435 mm (4 ft 8 1/2 in) railway, 120 kilometres (75 mi) of 600 mm (1 ft 11 5/8 in) railway and 2,258 kilometres (1,403 mi) of 1,067 mm (3 ft 6 in) tramway, excluding Jakarta's urban tramways. Forestry and plantation authorities had also constructed approximately 7,000 kilometres (4,300 mi) of industrial railway, of which about 6,500 kilometres (4,000 mi) served the sugar industry.

=== Japanese occupation and post-independence ===
The Japanese occupation and the Indonesian War of Independence left Indonesia's railways in poor condition. A batch of 100 steam locomotives was ordered in 1950, and dieselisation began in 1953. By the 1980s, most mainline services had been dieselised. Electric multiple units were obtained from Japan beginning in the 1970s, replacing electric locomotives that were approximately 60 years old.

Since independence, all mainline railways in Indonesia have been managed by the state. The owners of private railways were initially compensated, and the system was fully nationalised in 1971.

Few new railway lines were built, with most construction instead involving the double-tracking and quadruple-tracking of existing lines. Most former tramway lines were closed, reducing the total length of the network from approximately 7,000 kilometres (4,300 mi) to 3,000 kilometres (1,900 mi).

== Regulator and operators ==
=== Regulator ===
The Directorate General of Railways, part of the Ministry of Transportation, is the sole regulator of Indonesia's rail transport system. Established on 5 August 2005 during the administration of President Susilo Bambang Yudhoyono and Minister of Transportation Hatta Rajasa, the directorate general is responsible for regulating rail transport in Indonesia. Its first director-general was Soemino Eko Saputro, a former chief executive of Perumka, the predecessor of Kereta Api Indonesia. During his tenure, Saputro became involved in a corruption case concerning procurement of electric multiple units from Japan. The case involved reported state losses of Rp20 billion.

=== Operators ===
==== Pre-independence ====
The first railway operator in the Dutch East Indies was the privately owned Nederlandsch-Indische Spoorweg Maatschappij (NIS), followed by the Bataviasche Tramweg Maatschappij. The colonial government established the state-owned Staatsspoorwegen in 1875. Numerous other railway and tramway companies subsequently began operating:

- Atjeh Tram
- Babat-Djombang Stoomtram Maatschappij
- Bataviasche Elektrische Tram Maatschappij
- Bataviasche Oosterspoorweg Maatschappij
- Bataviasche Verkeers Maatschappij
- Deli Spoorweg Maatschappij
- Javasche Spoorweg Maatschappij
- Kediri Stoomtram Maatschappij
- Madoera Stoomtram Maatschappij
- Malang Stoomtram Maatschappij
- Modjokerto Stoomtram Maatschappij
- Nederlands-Indische Spoorweg Maatschappij
- Nederlands-Indische Tramweg Maatschappij
- Oost-Java Stoomtram Maatschappij
- Pasoeroean Stoomtram Maatschappij
- Poerwodadie–Goendih Stoomtram Maatschappij
- Probolinggo Stoomtram Maatschappij
- Samarang-Joana Stoomtram Maatschappij
- Semarang-Cheribon Stoomtram Maatschappij
- Serajoedal Stoomtram Maatschappij
- Solosche Tramweg Maatschappij
- Staatstramwegen op Celebes

==== Japanese occupation ====
After the Dutch surrendered to Japan, all Dutch railway operators in Java were consolidated into a Japanese-established organisation called Rikuyu Sokyoku. In addition to operating the railways, the organisation was responsible for other forms of non-military land transportation. Railways in Sumatra were administered separately by the Imperial Japanese Navy which controlled the Malay Peninsula and Sumatra from its headquarters in Singapore.

==== Post-independence ====
Passenger and freight railway operators in Indonesia include:

- PT Kereta Api Indonesia (KAI), which operates local, regional and intercity trains, as well as the Palembang and Jabodebek light rail systems
  - PT Railink (KAI Bandara), a joint venture with Angkasa Pura II that operates airport rail services
  - PT Kereta Commuter Indonesia (KAI Commuter), which operates commuter rail services
  - PT Kereta Api Logistik (KAI Logistik), which provides rail freight and courier services
- PT MRT Jakarta, which operates the Jakarta MRT and is owned by the provincial government of the Special Capital Region of Jakarta
- PT LRT Jakarta, which operates the Jakarta LRT and is a subsidiary of Jakpro, a company owned by the provincial government of the Special Capital Region of Jakarta
- PT Angkasa Pura II, which operates the Soekarno-Hatta Airport Skytrain
- PT Kereta Cepat Indonesia–China, which operates the Jakarta–Bandung high-speed railway and is a joint venture between PT Pilar Sinergi BUMN Indonesia and Beijing Yawan HSR Co. Ltd.

Several agricultural and forestry companies also operate industrial railways:

- Perum Perhutani, which operates the Cepu Forest Railway
- Perkebunan Nusantara, a state-owned plantation company
  - PT Perkebunan Nusantara II, which operates palm-oil freight trains
  - PT Perkebunan Nusantara IV, which operates palm-oil freight trains
  - PT Perkebunan Nusantara IX, which operates sugarcane railways and a tourist train
- PT Bakrie Sumatra Plantations, part of Bakrie Group, which operates rubber and palm-oil freight trains
- PT Tanjung Enim Lestari, which operates pulp freight trains

== Rolling stock ==
=== Preserved steam locomotives ===
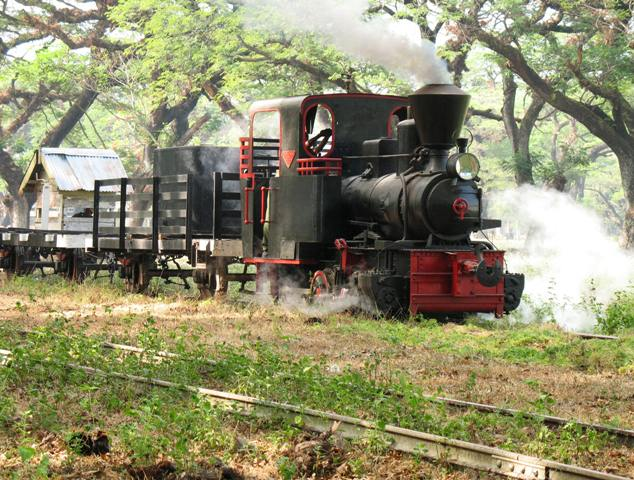
A Du Croo & Brauns locomotive on the Cepu Forest Railway

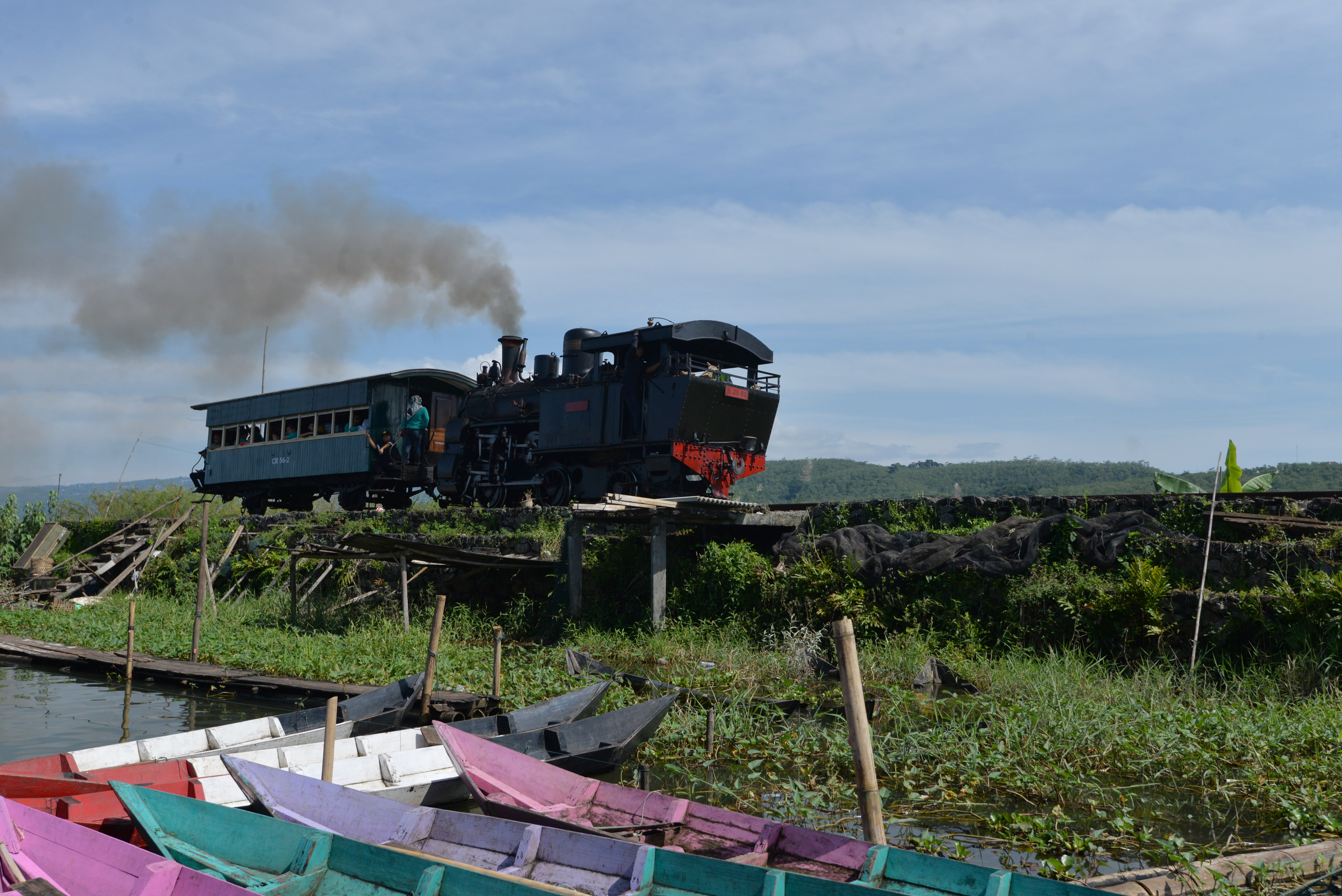
A steam train at the Ambarawa Railway Museum

Indonesia inherited various types of locomotives from its former railway companies. Only five steam locomotives remain operational, two located in the Ambarawa Railway Museum, two in Surakarta operating the Jaladara excursion train, and one at the Sawahlunto Railway Museum. Static steam locomotive displays are also displayed in the Transportation Museum (under the auspices of the Department of Transportation) in Jakarta's Taman Mini Indonesia Indah and at the Ambarawa Railway Museum in Central Java. Plinthed locomotives can be found in numerous cities and towns. Little other rolling stock has been preserved.

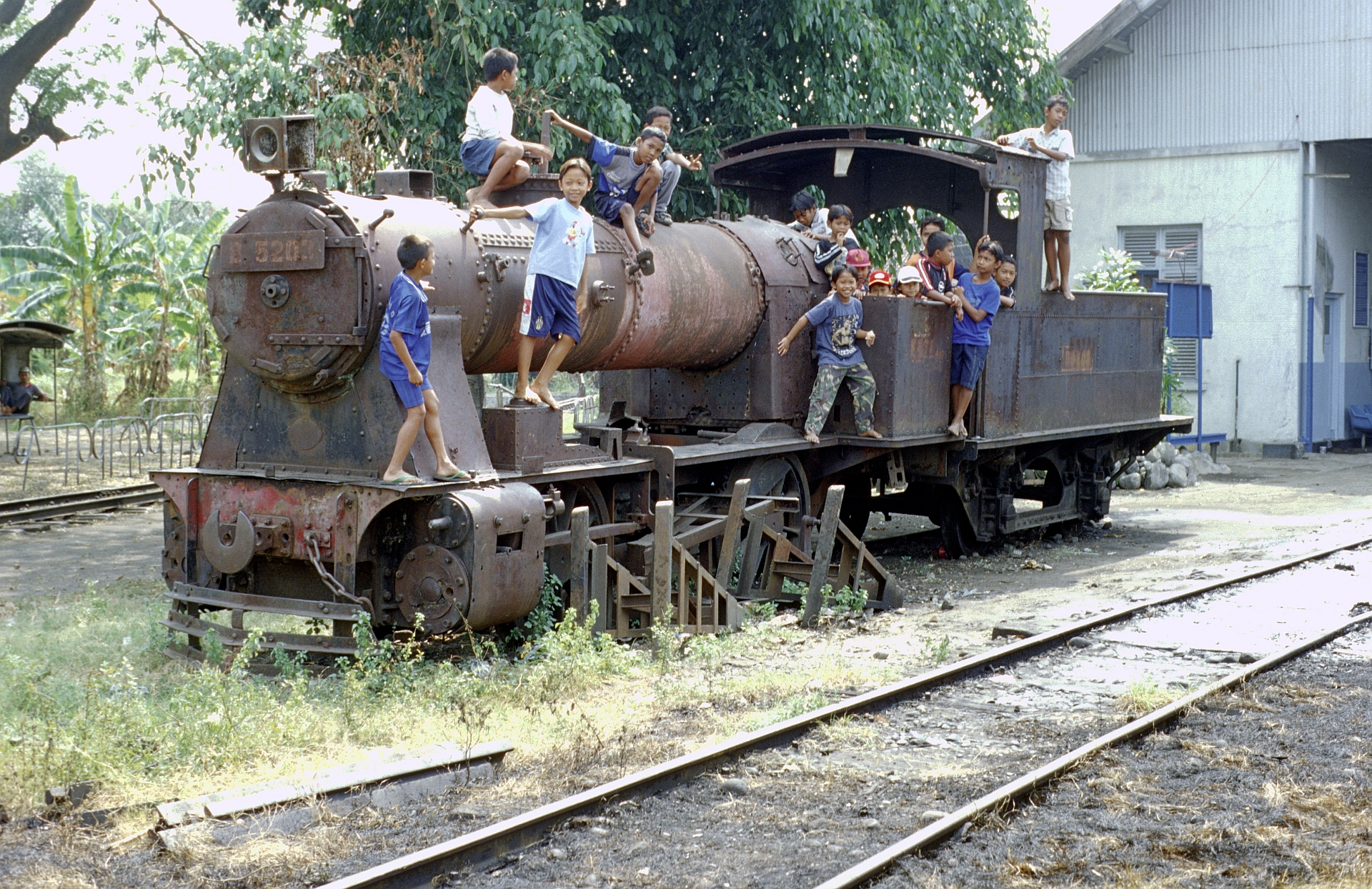
Derelict B52 03 at the Tegal locomotive depot on 9 July 2002

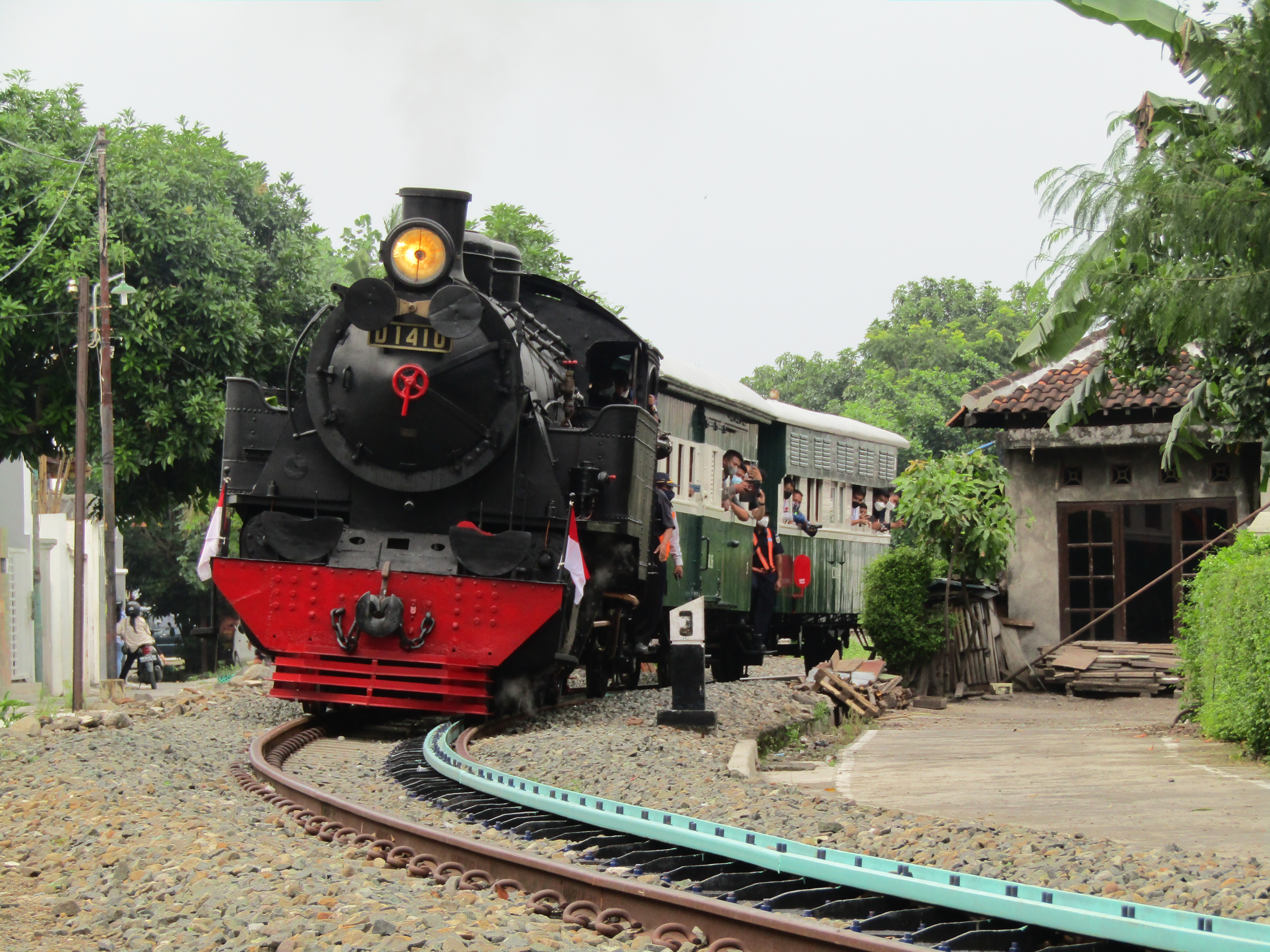
Locomotive D14 operating the Sepur Kluthuk Jaladara in Surakarta

During the 1997 Asian financial crisis, the derelict steam locomotives remaining at former depots became valuable as scrap. By 2000, most locomotives that had not been plinthed or transferred to museums had been scrapped, reportedly without authorisation.

Six operational industrial steam locomotives remain, two of which are based at the Cepu Forest Railway, the largest concentration of operational preserved steam locomotives in Indonesia.

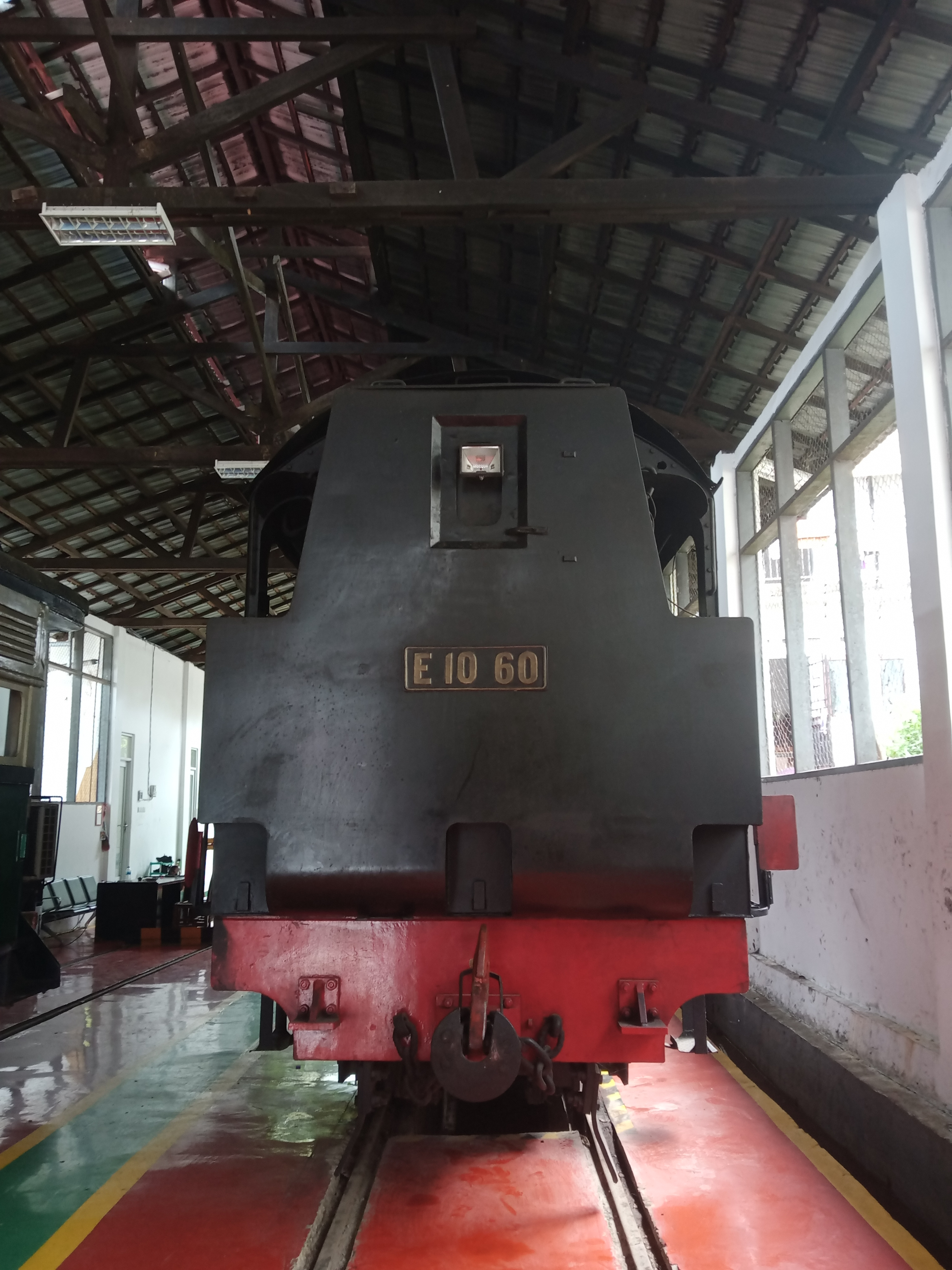
E 10 60, an operational locomotive at the Sawahlunto Railway Museum

Several of the last steam locomotives built for use in Indonesia have been preserved. E10 60, a rack steam locomotive built by Esslingen in 1966 (works number 5316), is operational at the Sawahlunto Railway Museum. According to Durrant, BB84 was the last Mallet locomotive built for a non-tourist railway. It was built by Nippon Sharyo Keizo Kaisha in 1962 (works number 2007). The locomotive was later plinthed in Banda Aceh and survived the December 2004 tsunami. As of March 2006, it was in poor condition, with its valve gear and cylinder pistons missing.

No. 1622, "Sri Gunung" ("Mountain Queen"), is an SS 1600-class Mallet locomotive built in 1928. It is preserved at the Dutch Railway Museum.

Trangkil No. 4 (Hunslet Engine Company, works number 3902) was built in 1971 and was the last steam locomotive built at Hunslet's Jack Lane Works in Leeds, England. It was used at the Trangkil sugar mill estate in Java before being repatriated to the United Kingdom in 2004.

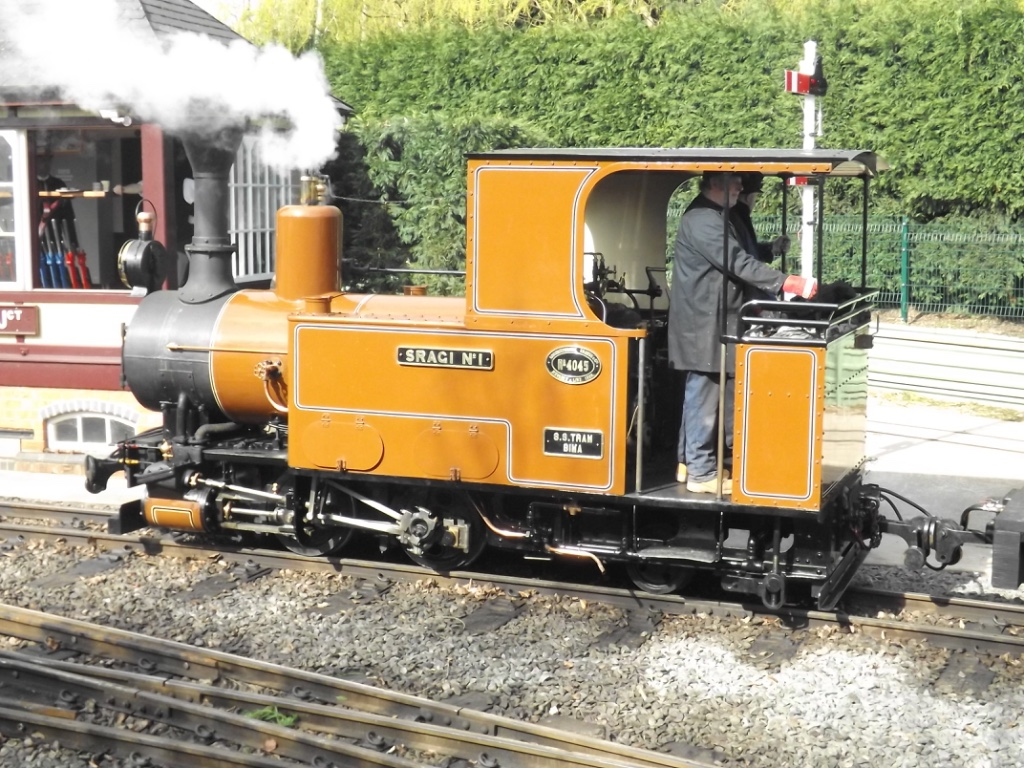
Locomotive Sragi No. 1 at the Statfold Barn Railway

Sragi No.1, built by Krauss in 1899, was restored to working order in 2008. It was formerly used to transport sugarcane in Pekalongan, Central Java. Two other locomotives, Pakis Baru No. 1 and Pakis Baru No. 5, were built by Orenstein & Koppel in 1900 and 1905, respectively. Both formerly operated at the Pakis Baru sugar factory in Pati, Central Java. All three locomotives are now preserved at Statfold Barn Railway in England.

A Great Railways documentary by filmmaker Nick Lera includes footage recorded in the mid-1970s of steam locomotives in Java and Sumatra, including Mallett locomotives on mountain lines, trams in city streets, and a rack locomotives in Sumatra.

=== Diesel locomotives ===
As of 2016, PT Kereta Api Indonesia operated approximately 350 diesel locomotives of various classes in Java and Sumatra for both passenger and freight services. The first diesel locomotive class operated by the company was the CC200 class, built by General Electric in 1953.

=== Electric trains ===
As of August 2017, PT Kereta Api's commuter subsidiary, Kereta Commuter Indonesia, operated 758 electric multiple-unit cars in the Greater Jakarta area. Most electric multiple units operated in Jakarta are second-hand trains acquired from major urban railway operators in Greater Tokyo, including the East Japan Railway Company, Tokyu Corporation and Tokyo Metro.

=== Carriages and wagons ===
Passenger carriages and freight wagons are unpowered railway vehicles hauled by locomotives. Different types of wagon are used for different forms of freight. Vehicles operated by the same company generally use compatible components, including couplings and air-brake hoses, allowing them to be assembled into trains. They commonly carry identification codes, reporting marks and serial numbers.

Several types of carriage and wagon have been used in Indonesia.

Class	Image	Type	Number built	Manufacturer	Max speed	Year built	Remark
							A special funeral wagon was prepared by the NIS to transport the coffin of Pakubuwana X

== Usage ==
=== Passenger services ===
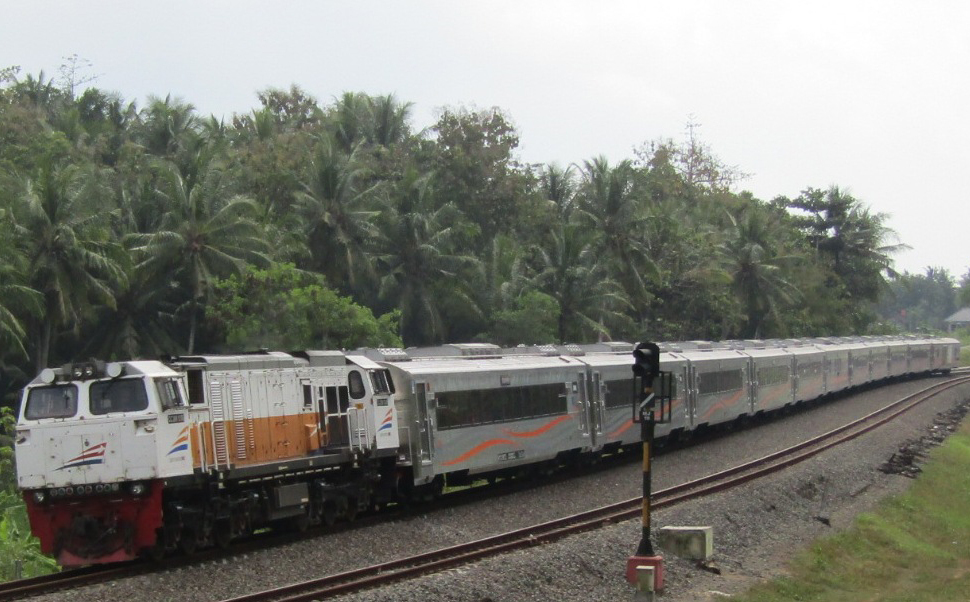
The Argo Wilis, a long-distance passenger train operating between Bandung and Surabaya

Kereta Api Indonesia (KAI) provides passenger services in several classes. Luxury-class carriages have reclining seats and amenities comparable to those offered on aircraft. Executive-class carriages are air-conditioned and have reclining seats, while business-class carriages offer similar facilities. Economy-class carriages provide air-conditioned bench seating on lower-priced services.

In response to passenger concerns about the lack of air conditioning, KAI and PT INKA began converting non-air-conditioned business-class and economy-class carriages during the 2010s. The programme was completed in early 2013, when air-conditioning systems were installed in the remaining non-air-conditioned express and local trains. Express and local trains use generator cars, and many also include baggage and dining cars.

Since the launch of the Java Priority in 2024, KAI has also operated air-conditioned, tourist-only express trains. These offer classes similar to those on regular services: Imperial class, with facilities comparable to those in luxury-class and executive-class carriages, and Priority class, with facilities comparable to those in business-class and economy-class carriages.

Sleeper services have operated in Indonesia. The Bima express was the last all-sleeper train service, operating in this configuration from 1967 to 1984. It was then converted primarily to seated accommodation, retaining only one or two sleeping cars. These remained in service until 1995, when they were withdrawn and converted into seating carriages. Sleeper services were reintroduced in 2018 on the Argo Bromo Anggrek between Jakarta and Surabaya, the Taksaka between Jakarta and Yogyakarta, the Argo Lawu and Argo Dwipangga between Jakarta and Solo, and the Gajayana between Jakarta and Malang.

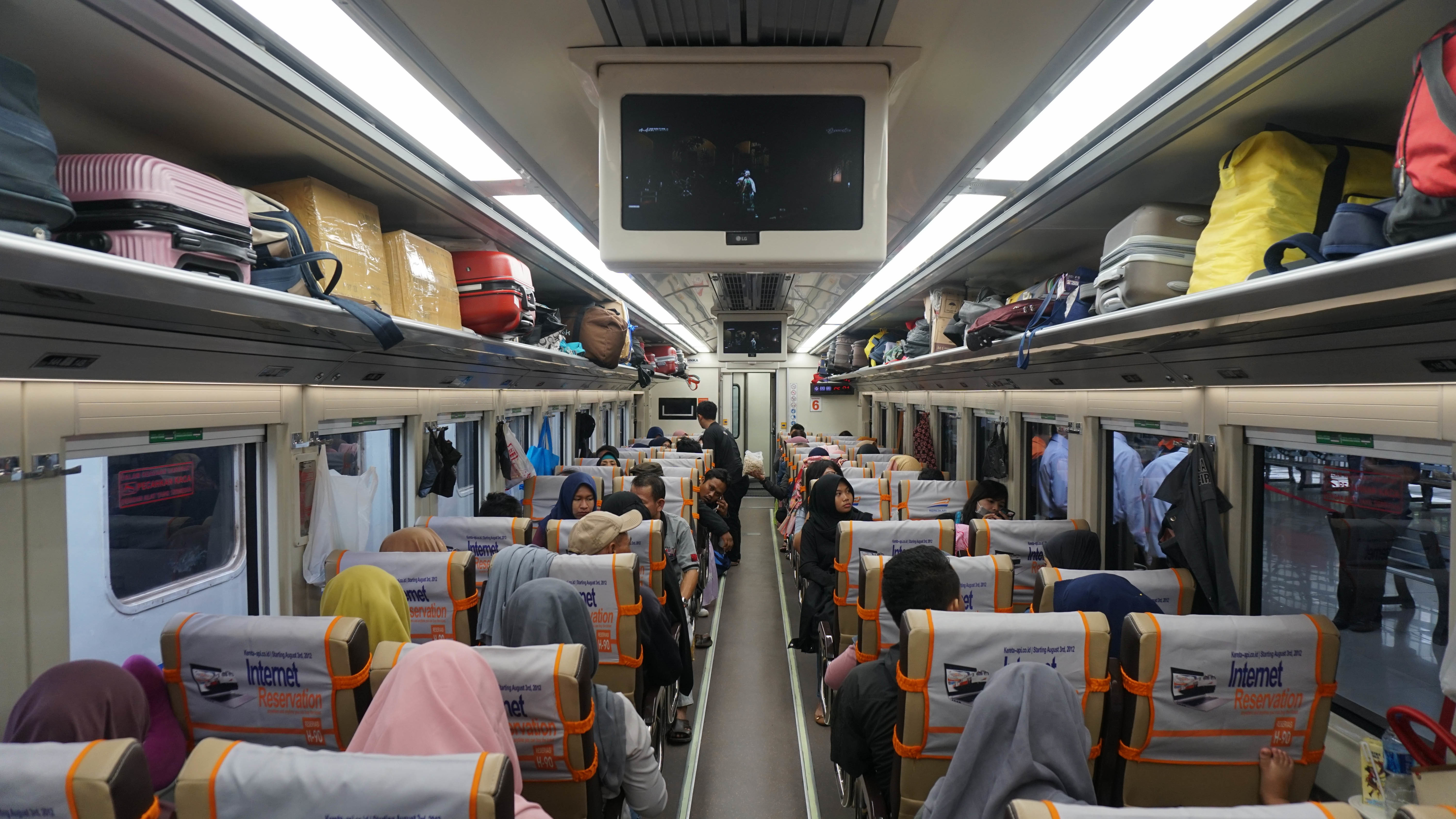
Interior of a Sawunggalih premium-economy carriage in 2017

In Java, most passenger trains connect Jakarta with other parts of the island, while regional services that do not serve Jakarta are less developed. Frequent services operate between some major cities, including Jakarta and Bandung.

Most passenger trains in Indonesia, apart from local commuter services, are named. Some names are descriptive, such as Depok Ekspres, a former express service between Jakarta and Depok, and Logawa, named after a river near Purwokerto, which the train serves. Others refer to geographical features, such as Argo Lawu, named after Mount Lawu, an extinct volcano near Solo. Some names combine elements of places served by the train. Bangunkarta, for example, is derived from Jombang-Madiun-Jakarta, while Matarmaja is derived from Malang-Blitar-Madiun-Jakarta.

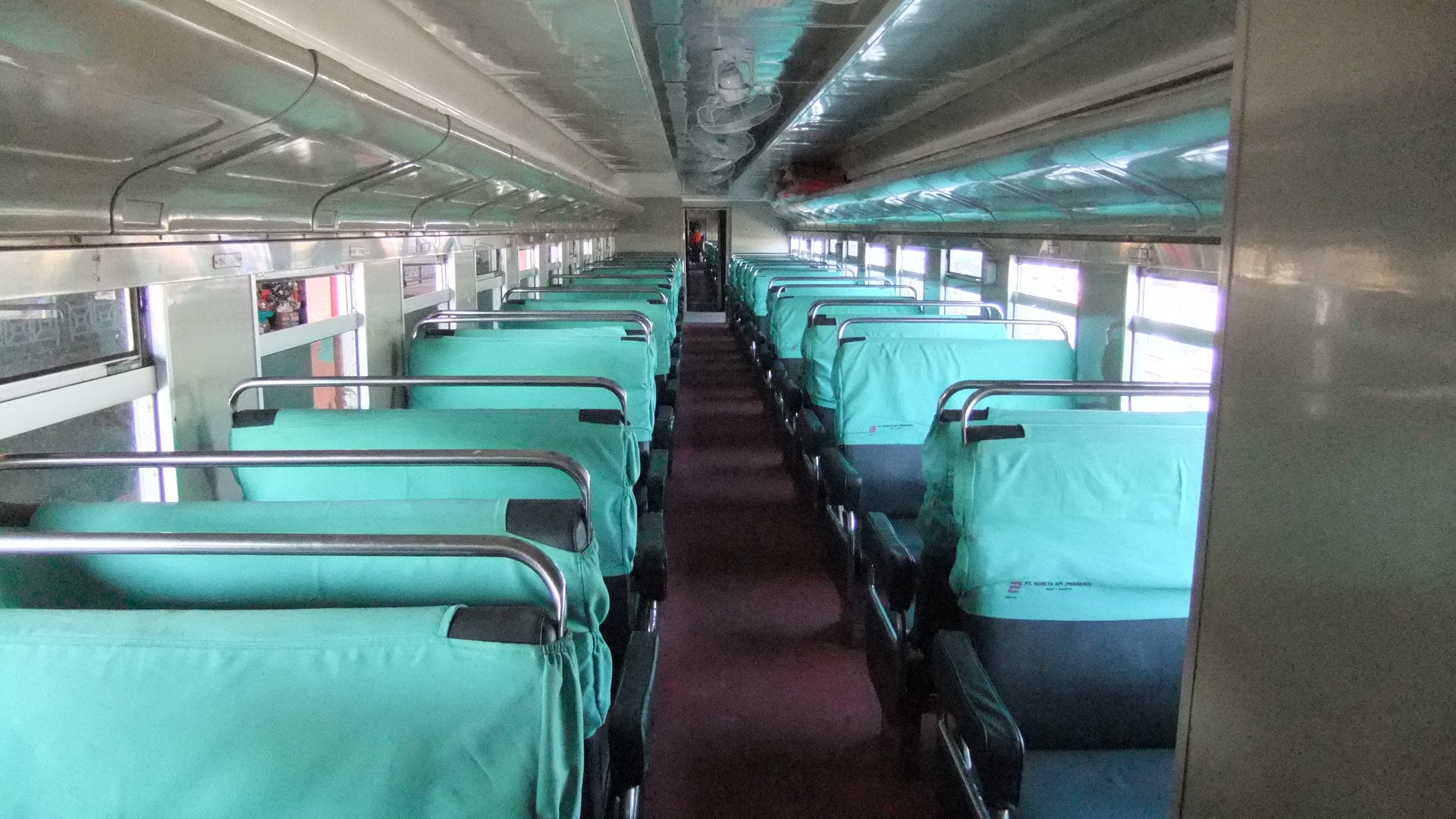
Interior of a Gumarang business-class carriage in 2009

Passenger rail services expanded between 1995 and 1999 with the introduction of several express services. The subsequent availability of low-cost air travel contributed to a decline in KAI's passenger numbers. Passenger numbers later stabilised, with most trains reportedly operating at more than 50 per cent occupancy.

==== Argo network ====

The Argo network was introduced in 1995, coinciding with the 50th anniversaries of Indonesian independence and Perumka. Its long-distance, diesel-hauled express services operate across Java, using carriages manufactured by PT INKA.

The Argo Gede and also Parahyangan services were subsequently merged to form the Argo Parahyangan, which serves the same route. The Argo Jati was merged intoArgo Cheribon, together with the Cirebon Express and Tegal Bahari services. The route was retained and extended to Tegal.

KAI also operates nine Argo passenger services across Java.

=== Women only carriages ===
In response to reports of harassment on public transport, KAI introduced women-only carriages on some KRL Jabodetabek commuter trains in the Jakarta metropolitan area in August 2010. On 13 May 2013, KAI discontinued women-only trains and instead reserved the first and last carriages of regular KRL Jabodetabek trains for women.

=== Priority seats ===
KAI designates priority seats for older passengers, pregnant women, passengers with disabilities and adults travelling with infants, providing them with the same access to and level of comfort on public transport as other passengers. Unlike women-only carriages, which are located at the front and rear of trains, eight seats in each carriage are designated as priority seats. This arrangement applies to KRL Commuterline services.

=== Priority class (sleeper trains) ===
KAI reintroduced sleeper services on 11 June 2018. The carriages offer reclining seats and other premium-class amenities. The first service operated between Gambir station in Jakarta to Surabaya. The sleeper service is managed by KAI Wisata and uses carriages manufactured by INKA.

In 2024, KAI introduced the PT INKA-built Compartment Suite sleeper carriage, an updated version of the 2018 design featuring private compartments instead of an open-plan layout.

=== Freight services ===
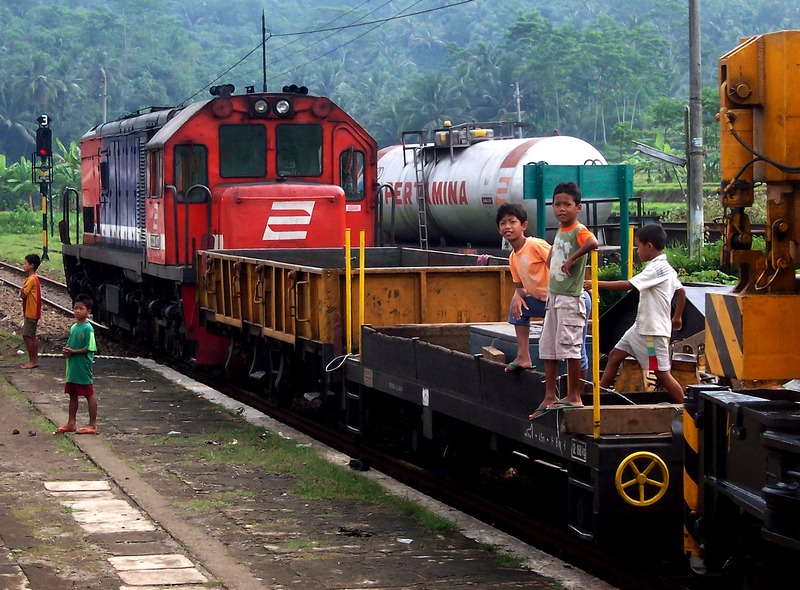
A CC 201-47 locomotive hauling a Gottwald crane in 2005

Historically, the railway network in Java has focused mainly on passenger transport, while freight services have remained comparatively limited because of capacity constraints. Nevertheless, several important freight services operate on the island, including the Kalimas container train, parcel trains between Jakarta and Surabaya, petroleum trains linking refineries or pipeline terminals with oil depots, and quartz-sand trains in Central Java. Railways are also used to transport steel for Krakatau Steel, with plans to expand shipments from the industrial city of Cilegon in western Java to other regions.

Since the 2010s, efforts have been made to increase freight traffic on Java's railways. These have included the introduction of GE CC206 locomotives and the construction of double-track sections along Java's North Coast line between Jakarta and Surabaya. The additional track capacity was intended in part to support more container trains between the two cities. New container terminals have also been developed in several intermediate cities and towns, helping to attract companies that previously relied on road transport.

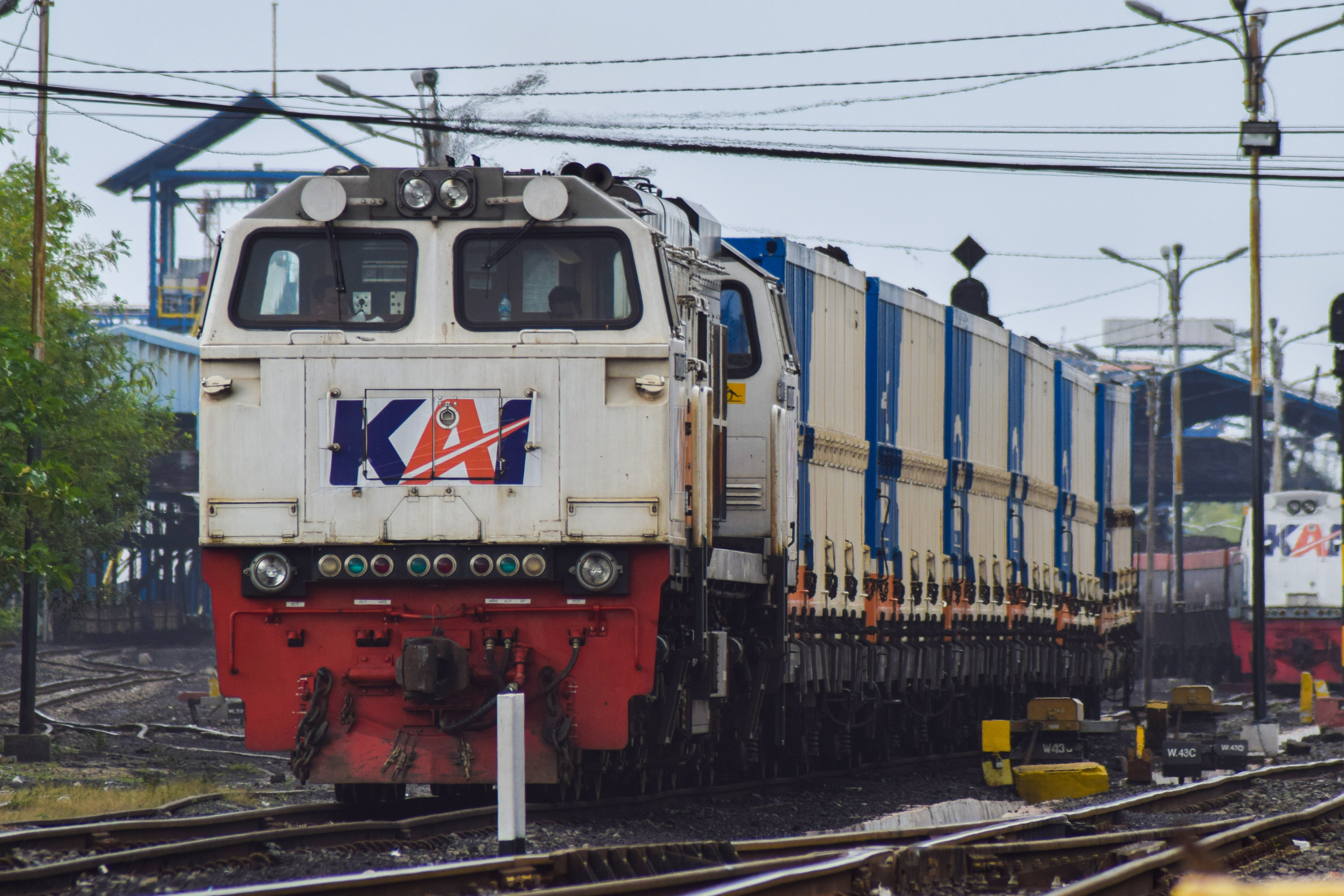
A GE CC206 locomotive hauling an empty coal train in 2015

Outside Java, freight plays a larger role in several regional railway systems. In South Sumatra, railway traffic is heavily focused on freight, particularly coal trains supplying power stations and pulp trains serving paper mills. Freight trains have long been given priority over passenger services in the region.

In West Sumatra, the remaining active railway line mainly serves the cement plant at Indarung, near Padang. In North Sumatra, freight trains transport products from oil palm and rubber plantations.

In Papua, Freeport Indonesia operates underground railways to transport ore from mines to processing facilities.

== Rail infrastructures by region ==
=== Java ===
Java's transportation network, including active railways as of 2010

The first railways in Indonesia were built in Java, using 1,435 mm (4 ft 8 1/2 in) gauge. During the Japanese occupation, they were converted to 1,067 mm (3 ft 6 in) gauge. At its greatest extent, the Java-Madura railway network covered 4,807 kilometres (2,987 mi) and connected most parts of the island. The network in Java is divided into nine operating area divisions.

=== Sumatra ===
Map of Sumatra's railway network. Red, dark red, brown, green, and blue lines indicate active routes.

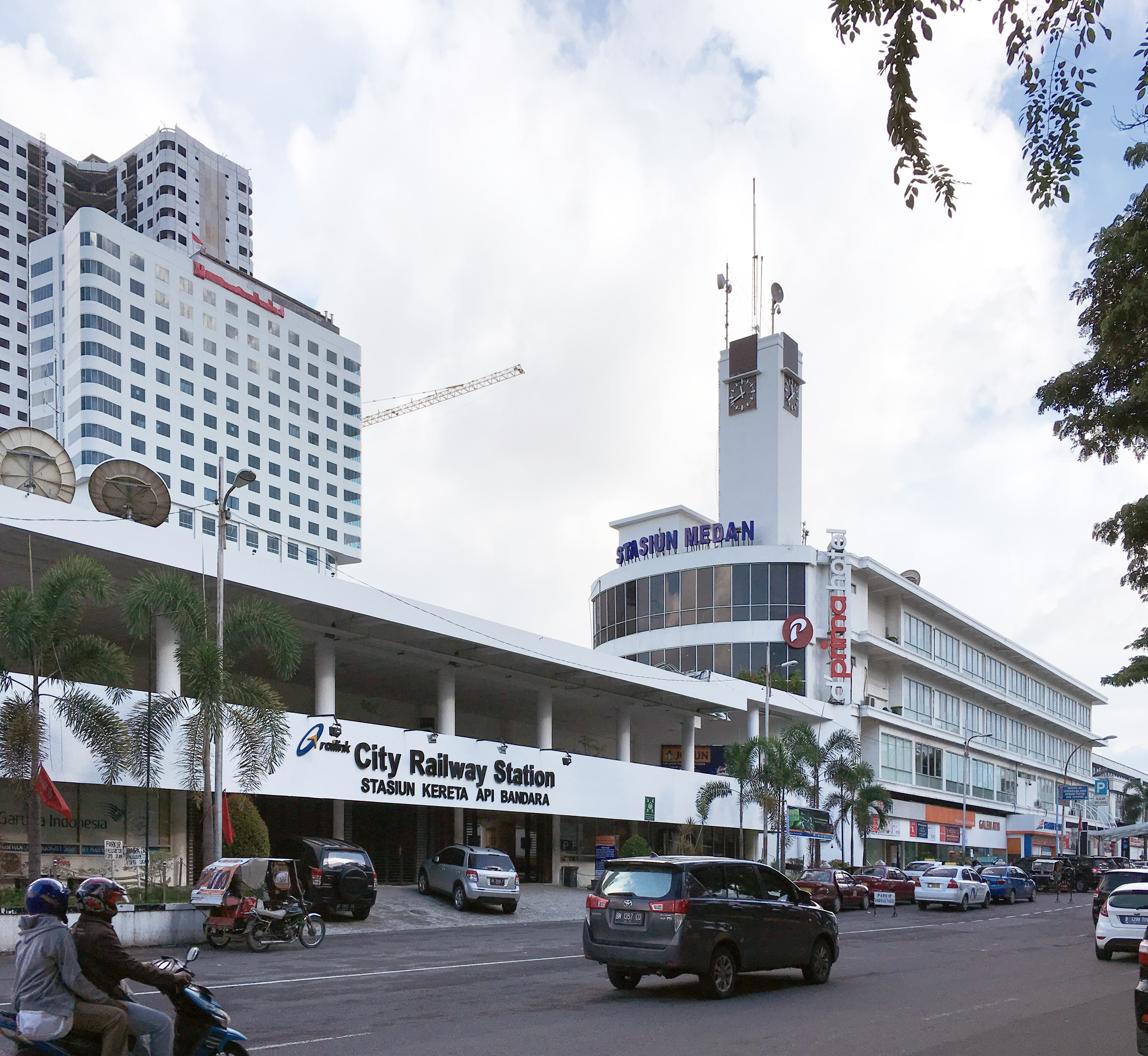
Medan railway station, serving intercity trains and Railink airport services to Kualanamu International Airport

As of 2013, Sumatra had 1,869 kilometres (1,161 mi) of railway track, of which 1,348 kilometres (838 mi) was operational. Several disconnected railway networks were built during the Dutch East Indies period:

- The Banda Aceh–Lhokseumawe–Besitang–Medan–Tebing Tinggi–Pematang Siantar–Rantau Prapat network in northern Sumatra. The 750 mm (2 ft 5 1/2 in) Banda Aceh to Besitang section closed in 1971. Reconstruction to 1,435 mm (4 ft 8 1/2 in) gauge was under way by 2011, and the rebuilt section opened in 2016. It serves five stations in North Aceh and Bireuën Regencies and is used by the Cut Meutia (train).).
- The Padang–Solok–Bukittinggi network in West Sumatra.
- The Bandar Lampung–Palembang–Lahat–Lubuk Linggau network in southern Sumatra.

Plans to connect and rehabilitate these networks form part of the Trans-Sumatra Railway project. Railway operations in Sumatra are divided among four regional divisions:

Regional Division 1 (North Sumatra and Aceh)	Regional Division 2 (West Sumatra)	Regional Division 3 (South Sumatra)	Regional Division 4 (Lampung and South Sumatra)
Medan – Tebing Tinggi; Araskabu – Kualanamu; Tebing Tinggi – Kisaran; Kisaran – Kotapinang; Kisaran – Tanjungbalai; Tebing Tinggi – Siantar; Medan – Belawan; Medan – Besitang; Kutablang – Krueng Geukueh	Teluk Bayur – Sawahlunto; Muara Kalaban – Padang Sibusuk; Bukit Putus – Indarung; Lubuk Alung – Pariaman; Pariaman – Sungai Limau; Padang Panjang – Payakumbuh; Payakumbuh – Limbanang; Padang Sibusuk – Muaro Sijunjung; Padang – Pulau Air; Duku – Minangkabau International Airport	Kertapati – Prabumulih; Simpang – Indralaya; Prabumulih – Lubuk Linggau	Tarahan – Prabumulih

In addition to the formal railway network, the Motor Lori Ekspress, commonly known as the "Molek", operates in Lebong Tandai, Bengkulu. The service uses motorised draisines operated by local residents to connect the isolated villages of Lebong Tandai and Air Tenang in the Napal Putih Subdistrict of North Bengkulu Regency. The 35 kilometres (22 mi) route through the Sumatran jungle follows a former 600 mm (1 ft 11 5/8 in) gold-mining railway built by the Dutch colonial administration in the early 20th century.

=== Kalimantan ===
The first railway in Kalimantan opened in 1908, serving an oil refinery and the port of Balikpapan. It closed in 1950. In 2010, plans were announced for the construction of a 122-kilometre (76 mi) 1,435 mm (4 ft 8 1/2 in) standard gauge railway to transport coal between a mine at Muara Wahau and the port of Bengalon. In January 2016, Russian Railways announced that construction would be completed in 2019. However, the company withdrew from the investment plan in 2022, and the railway project was cancelled.

=== Lesser Sunda Islands ===
In 2019, it was reported that the governor of Bali, Wayan Koster, is planning to construct a 1,435 mm (4 ft 8 1/2 in) electric railway network across the island.

In February 2024, Minister of Transportation Budi Karya Sumadi announced plans for an LRT system extending from Ngurah Rai International Airport to Mengwi. The first phase, connecting the airport with Kuta, was expected to begin construction in September 2024. A South Korean organisation was to conduct a feasibility study, and the project was expected to receive financing from South Korea.

=== Sulawesi ===
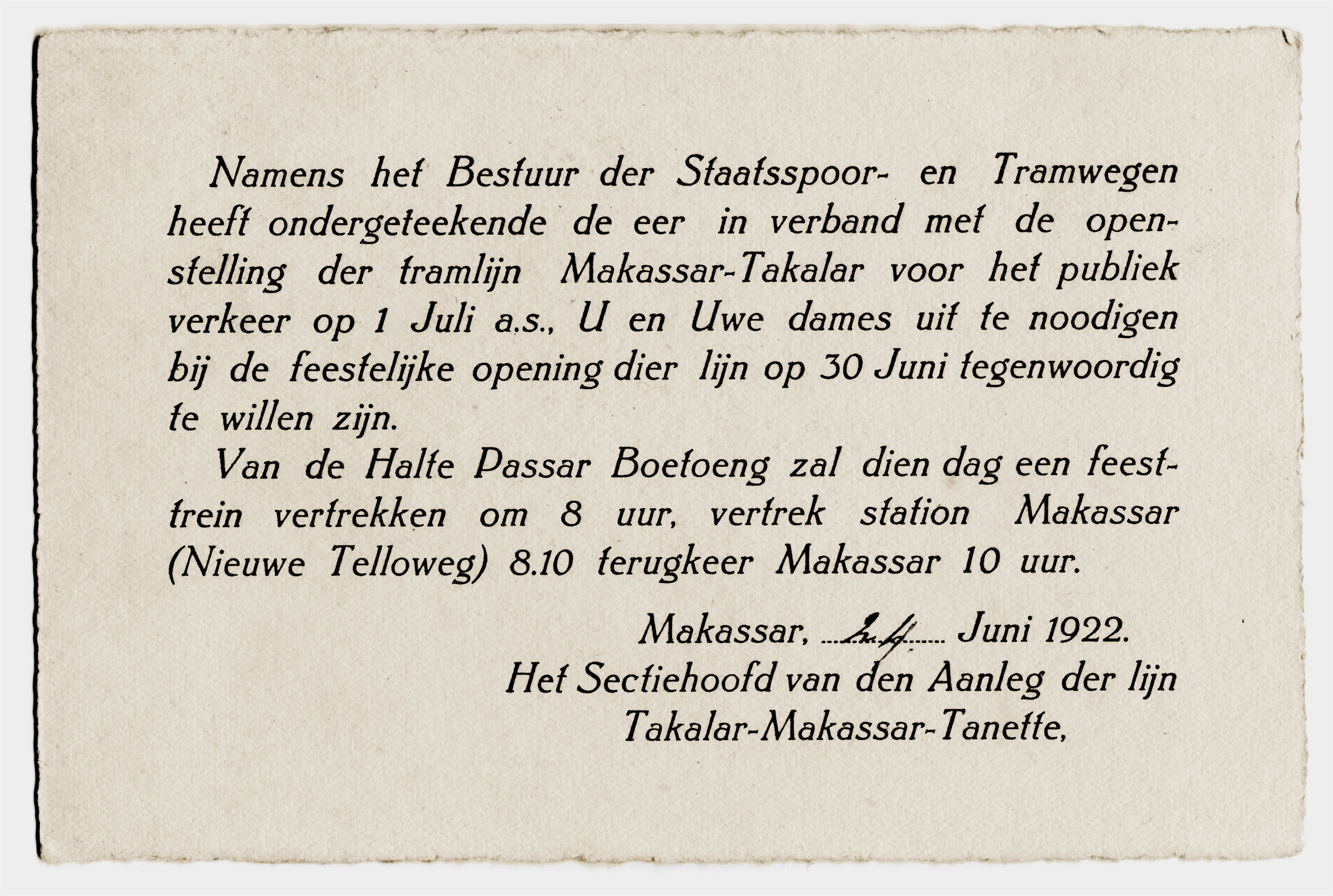
Invitation to 30 June 1922, opening of the Makassar-Takalar line

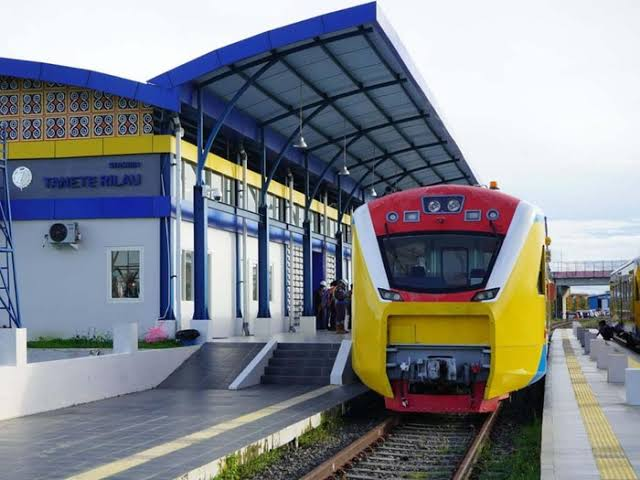
Tanete Rilau Railway Station, Barru Regency on the Makassar – Parepare Railway Line segment

The first railway network in Sulawesi was opened in 1922, connecting Makassar and Takalar, but was closed in 1930 due to poor revenue. The newer Trans-Sulawesi Railway is under construction as of 2022. It will be built with 1,435 mm (4 ft 8 1/2 in) standard gauge, which is wider than the cape gauge used in Java and most of Sumatra to accommodate more weight and speed. The ground breaking of Makassar–Parepare route was conducted on 18 August 2014, in Siawung Village, Barru District, Barru Regency. On early November 2022, 66 km (41 mi) of railway from Barru to Pangkep was inaugurated and operational. As of 2022, it is the only operational part of the railway.

=== Papua ===
A 440 km railway from Manokwari to Sorong in West Papua province is planned. In Papua there is also a railway line assigned to transport mining products which is located in the Grasberg mine, Mimika Regency, near Puncak Jaya, and operated by PT. Freeport Indonesia and has been operating since 2019. Besides that, a train line is also operated specifically for students at the Nemangkawi Mining Institute.

== Urban rail ==
=== Rapid Transit ===
City	Name	Service opened	Last expanded	Stations	Lines	System length	Annual ridership (millions)	Images
Jakarta	Jakarta MRT	2019	–	13	1	15.7 km (9.8 mi)	33 (2023)	MRT Jakarta set 6
Jakarta	Jakarta LRT	2019	2026	11	1	5.8 km (3.6 mi)	0.94 (2023)	Jakarta LRT Train at Velodrome LRT Station
Jakarta	Jabodebek LRT	2023	–	18	2	44.5 km (27.7 mi)	7.25 (2023)	Jabodebek LRT
Palembang	Palembang LRT	2018	–	13	1	23.4 km (14.5 mi)	3.0 (2023)	LRT Palembang with Ampera Bridge

=== Commuter Rail ===
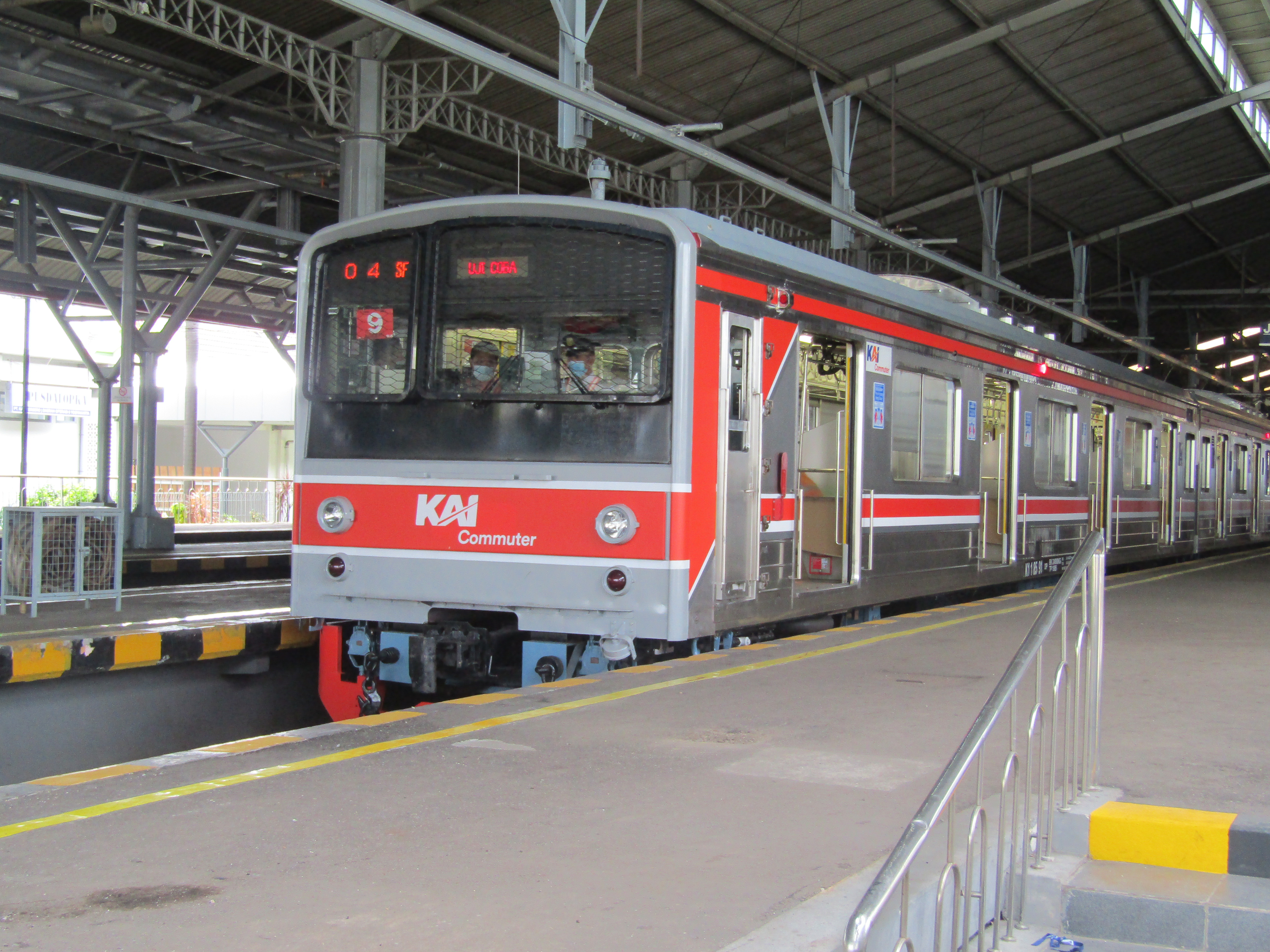
A KRL Commuterline electric train takes stop on the Tugu Yogyakarta station, Yogyakarta, December 2020. This set is JR-205-9 train, which is now returned to Jakarta, operated for Bogor Line only.

Indonesian Commuter Train is a subsidiary of Indonesian Railways which operates commuter trains, airport trains and local trains. Throughout 2023, the company successfully transported 331.895 million passengers throughout its operational areas.

The company began its history as the Jabotabek Urban Transportation Division of Indonesian Railways which was tasked with operating KRL in Jabodetabek, while long-distance trains and local trains in Jabodetabek continued to be operated by the Jakarta Operations Area (Daop) I. In September 2008, the division was officially separated into a separate company named PT KAI Commuter Jabodetabek. In March 2009, the company brought in 8 units of the Tokyu 8500 series KRL and then operated them under the name Jalita (Jalan-Jalan Lintas Jakarta). In May 2009, Minister of State-Owned Enterprises Sofyan Djalil and Minister of Transportation Jusman Syafii Djamal inaugurated the company. In August 2010, Minister of Transportation Freddy Numberi and Minister of State for Women and Children Empowerment Linda Amalia Sari inaugurated women-only carriages on the first and last trains of each KRL train.

In June 2020, Minister of State Owned Enterprises Erick Thohir, Minister of Transportation Budi Karya Sumadi, and Governor of Jakarta Anies Baswedan inaugurated Tanah Abang, Sudirman, Juanda, and Pasar Senen as integration stations. In October 2020, Indonesian Railways transferred the management of Merak Local Train in Daop I Jakarta and Prambanan Ekspres in Daop VI Yogyakarta to this company. In 2021, the company began operating the Commuter Line for the Yogyakarta–Solo Balapan pp route and the Prambanan Ekspres for the Yogyakarta–Kutoarjo pp route. In March 2021, President Joko Widodo inaugurated the operation of the Commuter Line for the Yogyakarta–Solo Balapan route.

Area	System name	System length	Line(s)	Stations	Electric powered	Annual ridership (millions)
Greater Jakarta, Lebak, Karawang, and Purwakarta	KRL Commuterline	418.0 km	5	80	Yes	336.270
Greater Jakarta, Lebak, Karawang, and Purwakarta	Soekarno-Hatta Airport Rail Link	54.3 km	1	5	Yes	2.000
Greater Jakarta, Lebak, Karawang, and Purwakarta	Merak Commuter Line	68.5 km	1	13	No	
Greater Jakarta, Lebak, Karawang, and Purwakarta	Jatiluhur Express	41.0 km	1	8	No	
Greater Jakarta, Lebak, Karawang, and Purwakarta	Walahar	60.0 km	1	10	No	
Greater Bandung and West Java	Greater Bandung Commuter Line	42.0 km	1	22	No	14.700
Greater Bandung and West Java	KCJB Feeder Train	14.9 km	1	3	No	
Greater Bandung and West Java	Garut Commuter Line	100.0 km	1	29	No	
Greater Yogyakarta and Surakarta	Yogyakarta Commuter Line	65.4 km	1	13	Yes	7.400
Greater Yogyakarta and Surakarta	Prambanan Express	64.0 km	1	5	No	4.000
Greater Surabaya and East Java	Surabaya and East Java commuter and local trains		7		No	13.400

=== Trams system ===
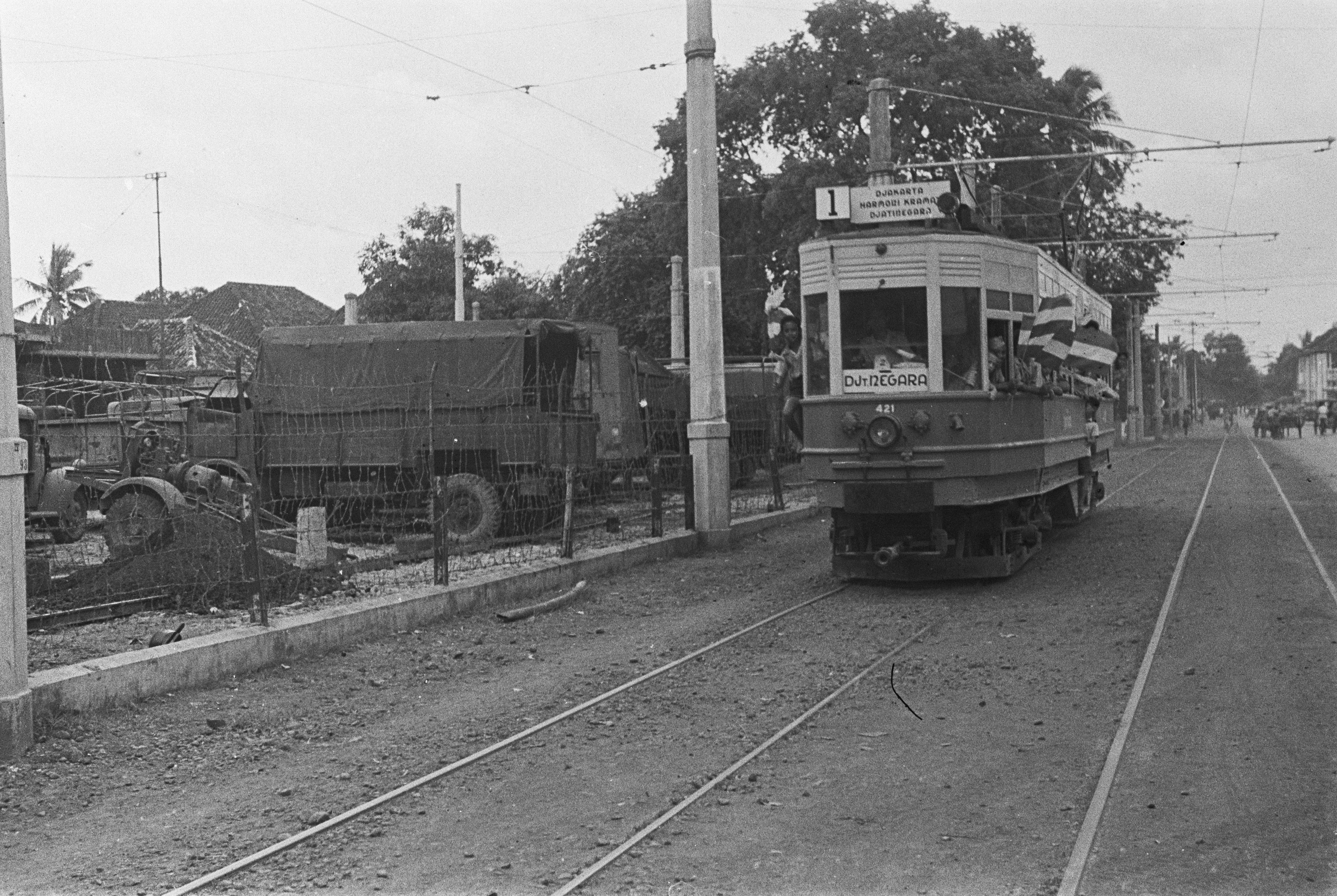
Trams in Jakarta near Jatinegara

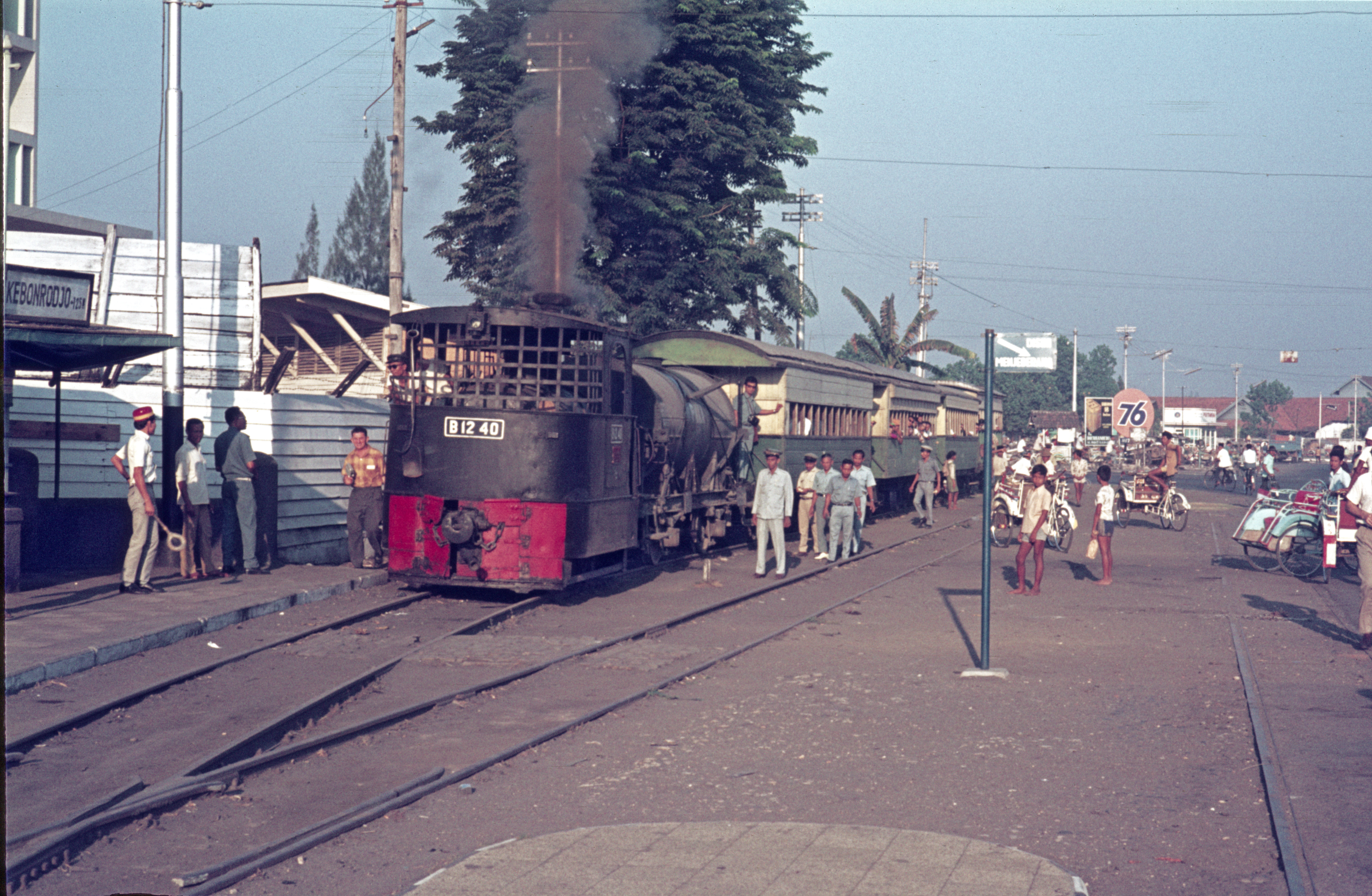
B12 49 tram locomotive at Kebonrodjo Halte, Surabaya, East Java, August 1972

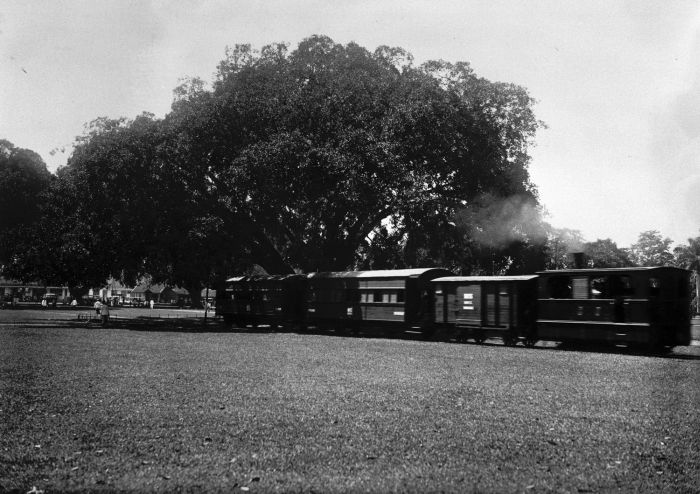
The city tram on the aloen-aloen in Malang

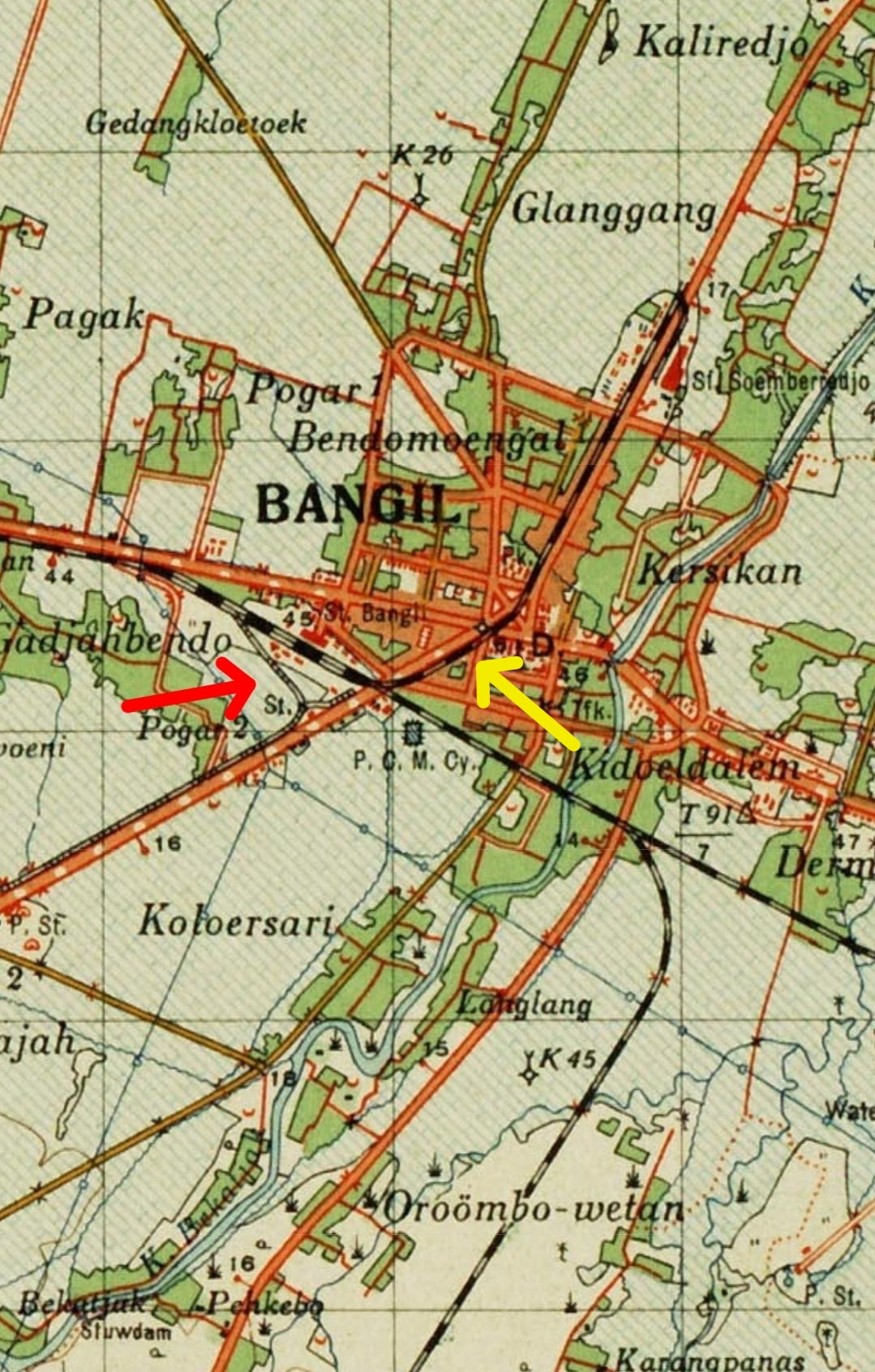
Map issued in 1937 showing Bangil station and line to Sumberredjo sugar mill which belonged to Staatsspoorwegen (SS) (yellow arrow) and line to Pandaan (Pandakan) which belonged to Modjokerto Steam Tram Company (red arrow). Also showed SS line to Malang (which showed a district named Oroombo-wetan) and to Probolinggo

Trams formerly existed in Jakarta, Surabaya, Malang, and Semarang before their service was closed after independence. In Jakarta the tram lines are operated using track gauge 1,188 mm (3 ft 10 25/32 in) operated by Bataviasche Verkeers Maatschappij and Pengangkutan Penumpang Djakarta, while in other areas track gauge 1,067 mm (3 ft 6 in) were used.

Trams in Indonesia first appeared during the Dutch East Indies era, with horse-drawn trams operating in Batavia (Jakarta) in 1869. In 1880, as a result of operational constraints experienced by BTM in operating horse-drawn tram, the operation of BTM was temporarily taken over by Firma Dummler and Co. Two years later, or to be precise on 19 September 1881, Bataviasche Tramweg Maatschappij (BTM) officially changed its name to Nederlandsch-Indische Tramweg Maatschappij (NITM) and took over the tram service in Batavia which was previously managed by Firma Dummler and Co.

Later, followed by steam trams and electric trams, with the latter starting to operate in Batavia in 1899. Trams were once a popular form of public transportation in various cities in Indonesia, but are no longer in operation. Trams in Indonesia, including in Jakarta and Surabaya, were eventually phased out for various reasons, such as being no longer efficient with the development of modern transportation and better road conditions. In Jakarta, electric trams were phased out in the 1960s.

==== Operator ====
===== Greater Jakarta =====
- Bataviasche Tramweg-Maatschappij
- Bataviasche Verkeers Maatschappij
- Pengangkutan Penumpang Djakarta
- Bataviasche Elektrische Tram Maatschappij
- Nederlands-Indische Tramweg Maatschappij

===== Greater Surabaya =====
- Oost-Java Stoomtram Maatschappij

===== Semarang =====
- Samarang-Joana Stoomtram Maatschappij
- Samarang-Cheribon Stoomtram Maatschappij

===== Others city =====
- Aceh: Atjeh Tram, Atjeh Staatsspoorwegen
- Tapanuli: Staatstramwegen in Tapanoeli
- South Sumatra: Staatstramwegen op Zuid-Sumatra
- Tegal: Javasche Spoorweg Maatschappij
- Banyumas: Serajoedal Stoomtram Maatschappij
- Purwodadi: Poerwodadie-Goendih Stoomtram Maatschappij
- Solo: Solosche Tramweg Maatschappij
- Madura: Madoera Stoomtram Maatschappij
- Malang: Malang Stoomtram Maatschappij
- Mojokerto: Modjokerto Stoomtram Maatschappij
- Jombang: Babat-Djombang Stoomtram Maatschappij
- Pasuruan: Pasoeroean Stoomtram Maatschappij
- Makassar: Staatstramwegen op Celebes

==== Rolling stock ====
The list provides only steam-tram rolling stock of Batavia until the year 1924. The list is sorted by its year.

Type	Manufacturer	Year	Quantity	NITM number	Seats capacity	Standing capacity	Picture	Remarks
Trailer	Bonnefond	1869	unknown	unknown	40	unknown		Horse-drawn (3–4 horses), 1188mm gauge
Fireless locomotive	Hohenzollern	1882–1883	21	1–21	not applicable	not applicable		1188mm gauge
Fireless locomotive	Hohenzollern	1884–1907	13	22–34	not applicable	not applicable		1188mm gauge
Steam locomotive	Hohenzollern	1921	17	51–67	not applicable	not applicable		1067mm gauge
Trailer type A	Beynes	1882	14	1–14	16	16		Became BVM A1-A14
Trailer type B	Beynes	1882	14	51–64	26	16		52 & 55 became type A 80 & 81 in 1925. 23 survivors became BVM B101-B123
Trailer type A	Beynes	1882–1889	9	91–99	24	16		
Trailer type B	Beynes	1882–1889	7	101–107	34	16		Became BVM AB201-AB207
Trailer type B	Beynes	1883	2	151, 152	40	16		Became BVM AB208, AB209
Trailer type AB	Beynes	1884	2	202, 202	40	16		
Trailer type c\C	Beynes	1887–1897	14	251–264	40	28		Became BVM AB208, AB209
Trailer type AB	Beynes	1897	2	211, 212	40	16		
Trailer type AB	NITM	1904	6	221–226	40	20		Became BVM AB253, AB254, AB256, C505, C506, C508
Pikolanwagen	Werkspoor	1904–1924	28	1–28	not applicable	not applicable		23 survivors became P1-P23
Trailer type C	NITM	1908-1810	7	271–277	40	28		274, 275 & 277 became type AB 231–233 in 1928. Later became 501, 507 & 508.
Trailer type AB	Werkspoor	1922–1923	21	301–321	36	28		Became BVM AB301-AB318, C422-C424
Trailer type C	Werkspoor	1922–1923	21	401–421	42	53		Became BVM C401-C421

==== Gallery ====
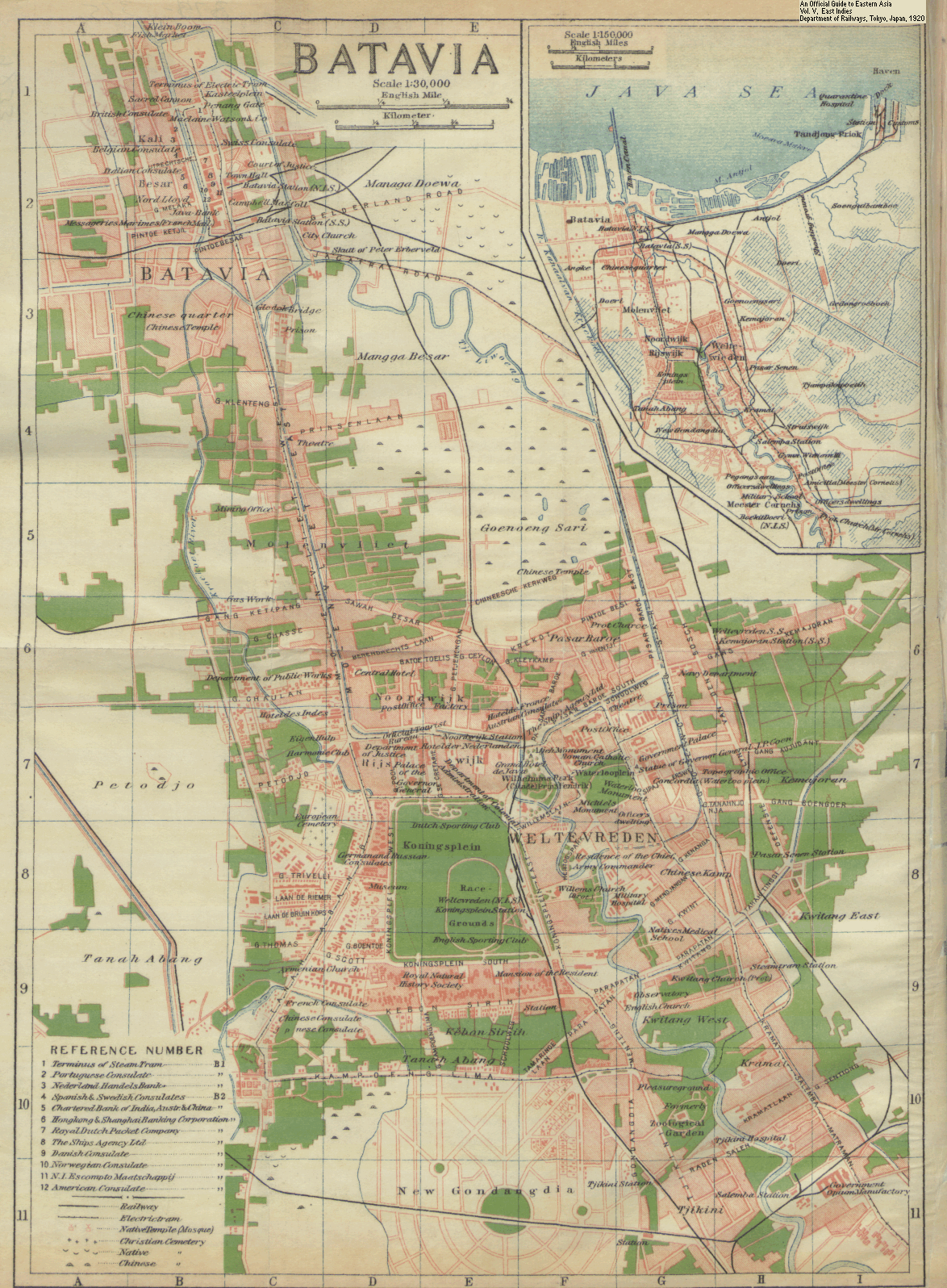
Map of Batavia tram lines.

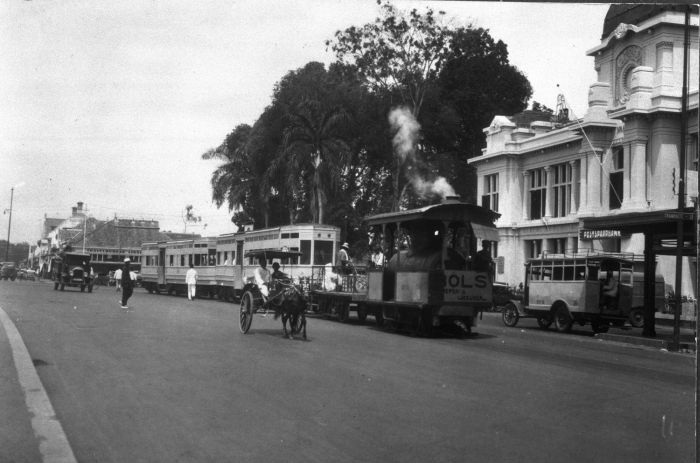
The Post Savings Bank located on the Molenvliet in the center of Batavia with busy tram traffic.

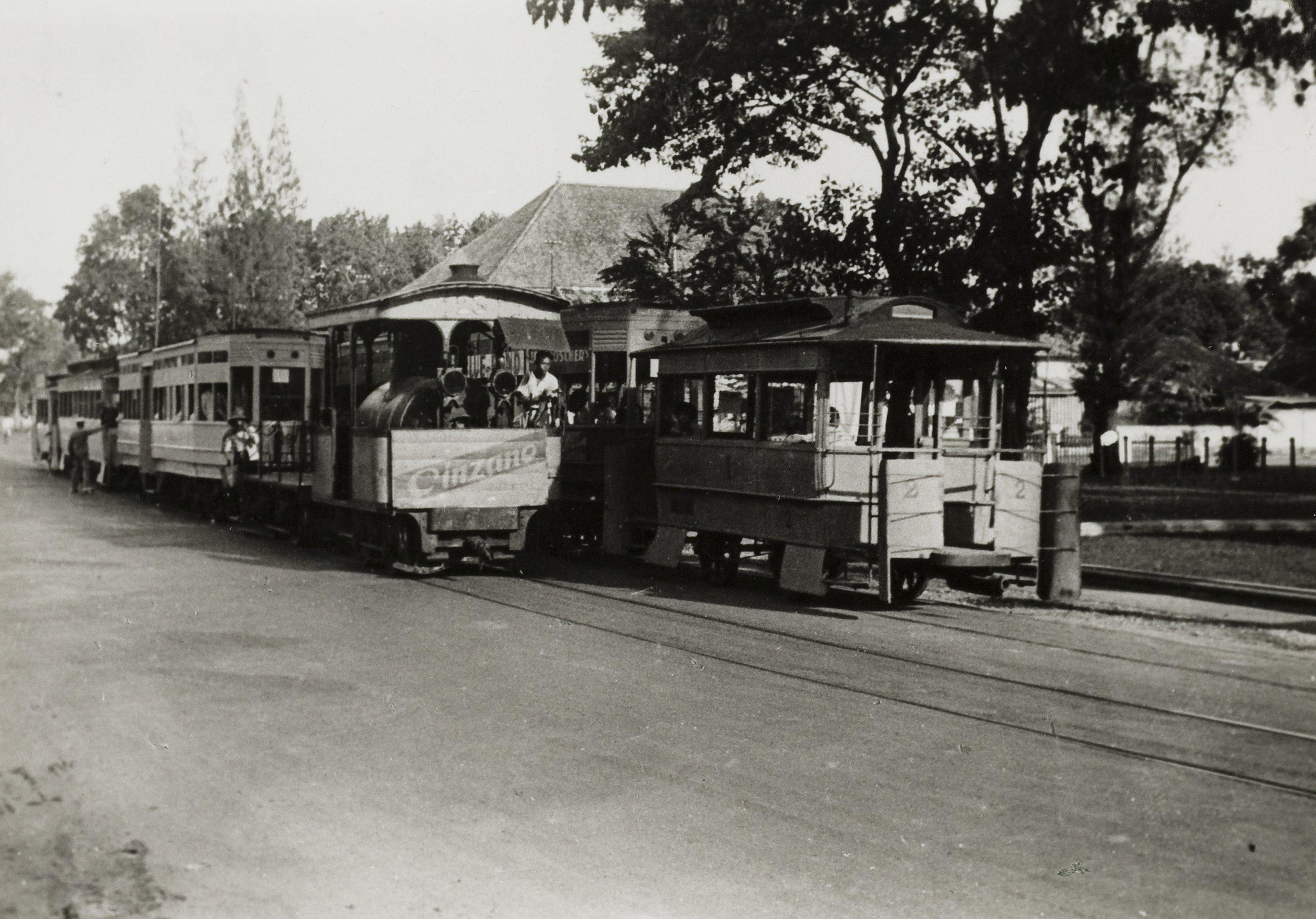
Steam tram of the Bataviasche Veerkers Maatschappij, nicknamed Aunt Betje, in Batavia (now Jakarta).

Opening of the Batavia Electric Tram Company in Batavia.

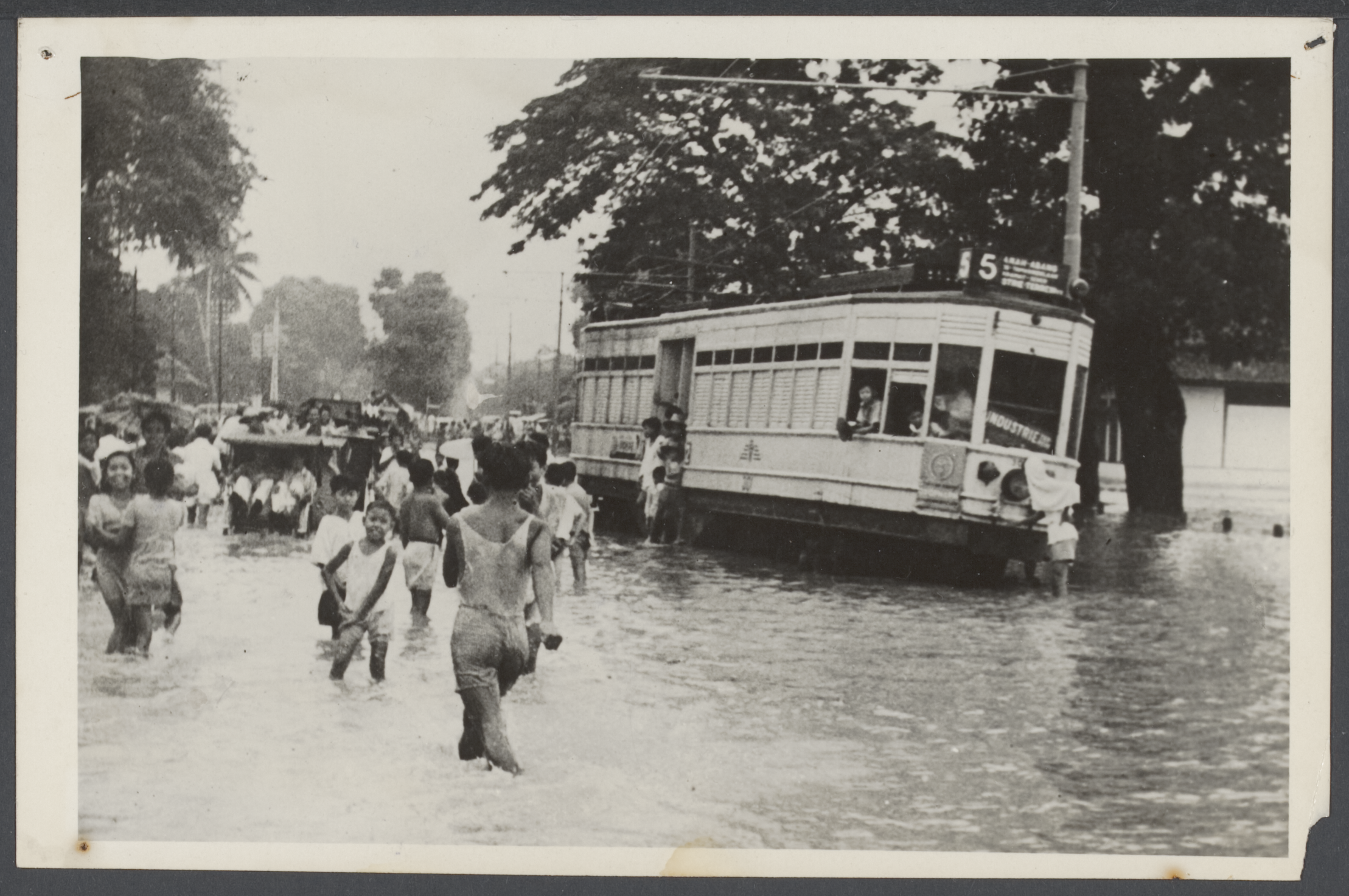
Electric tram in Batavia.

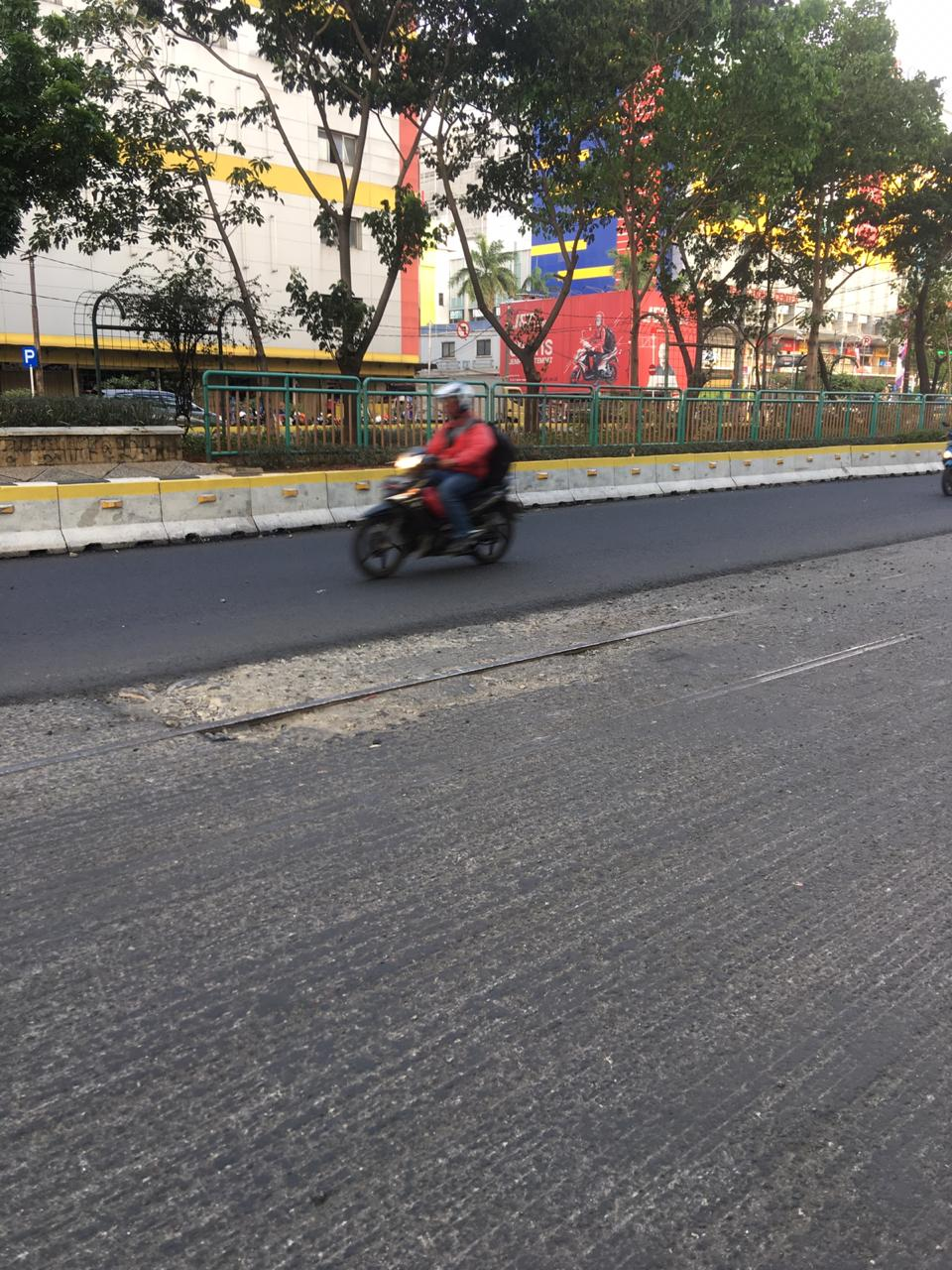
The remains of the former Jakarta tram tracks in Glodok, with a gauge of 1188mm.

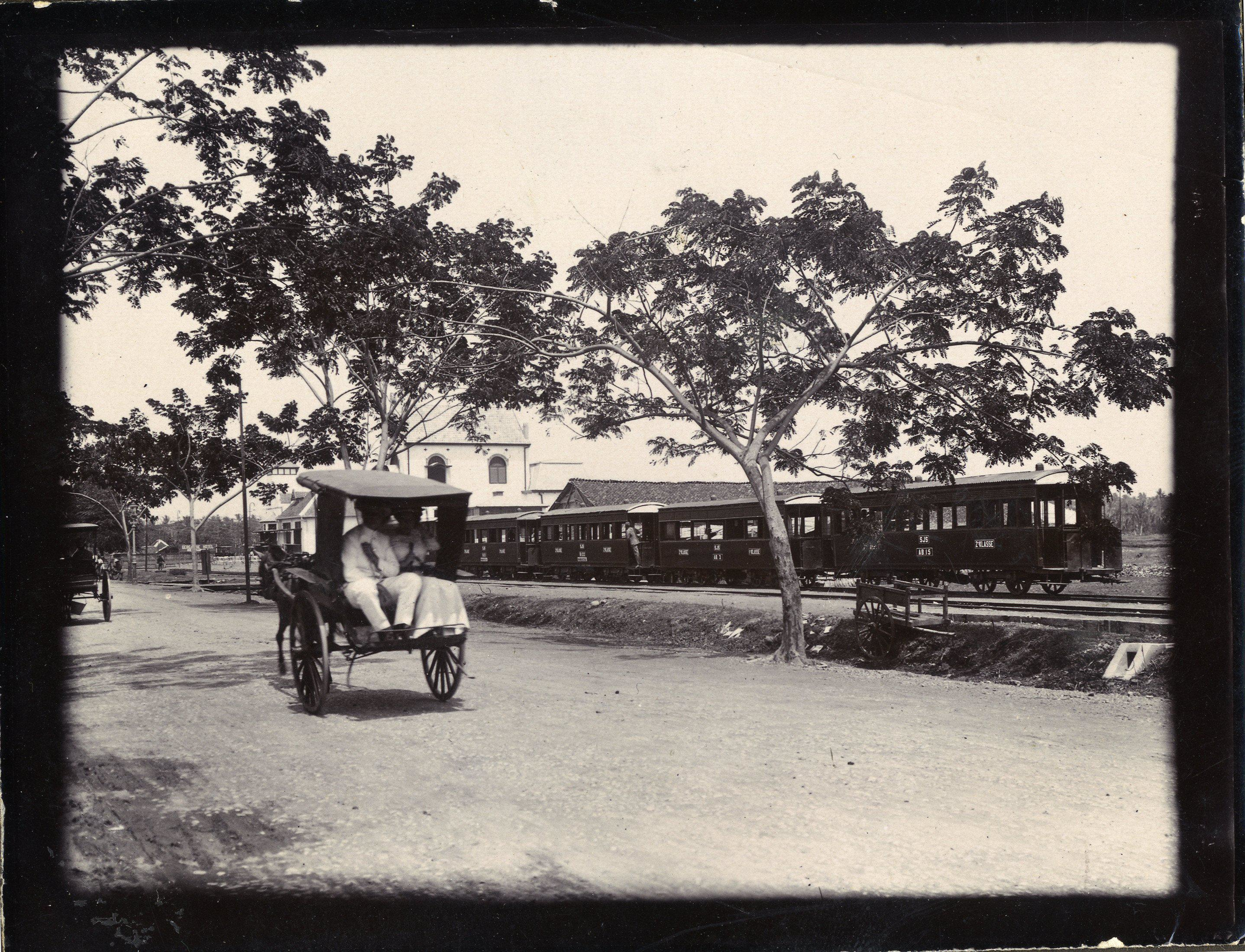
Tram at the terminus of the Bodjong-Pieter Sijthofflaan line at the grounds of the Colonial Exhibition in Semarang

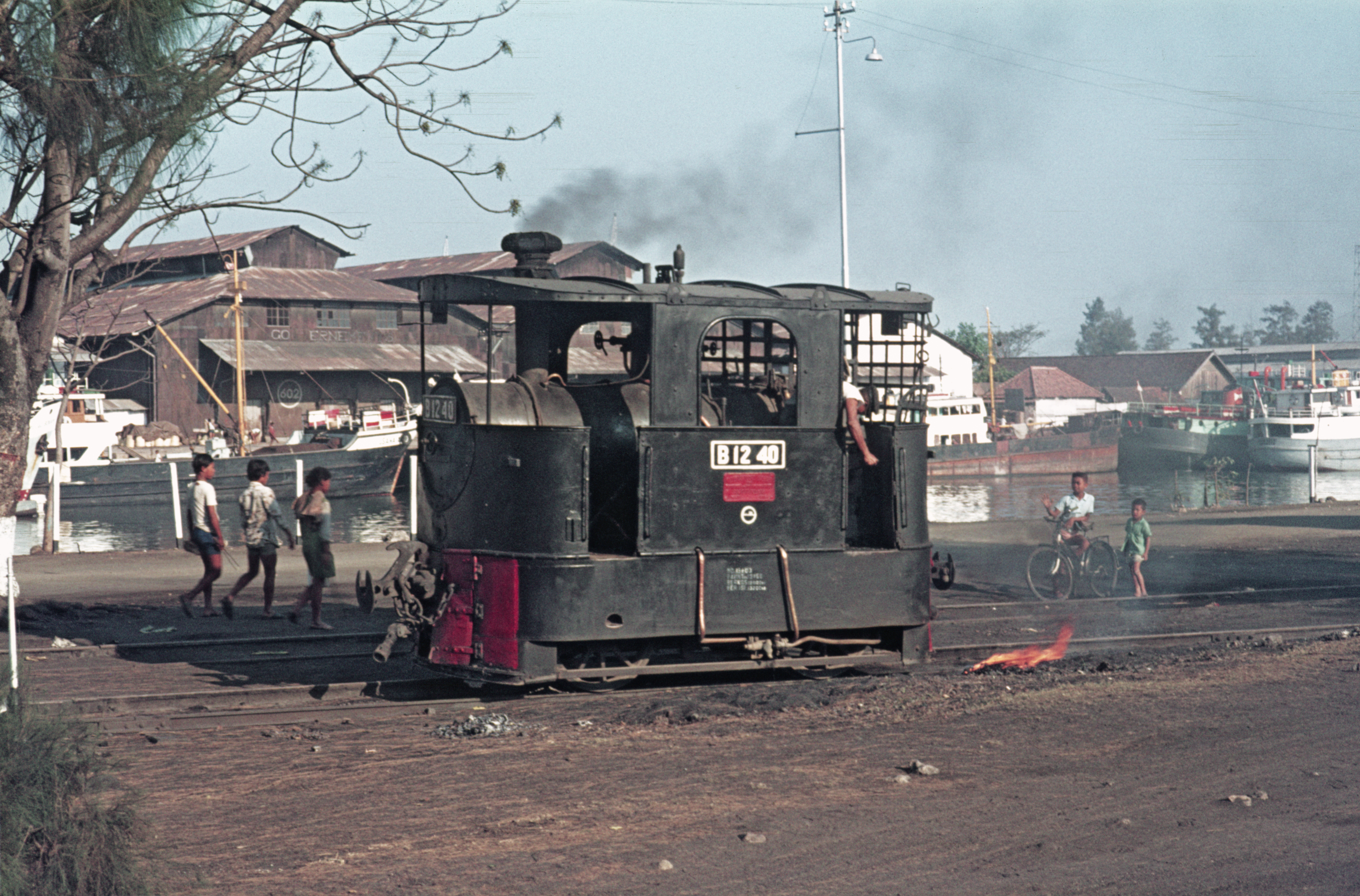
B12 40 tram locomotive, Kalimas, Surabaya, East Java, Indonesia August 1972

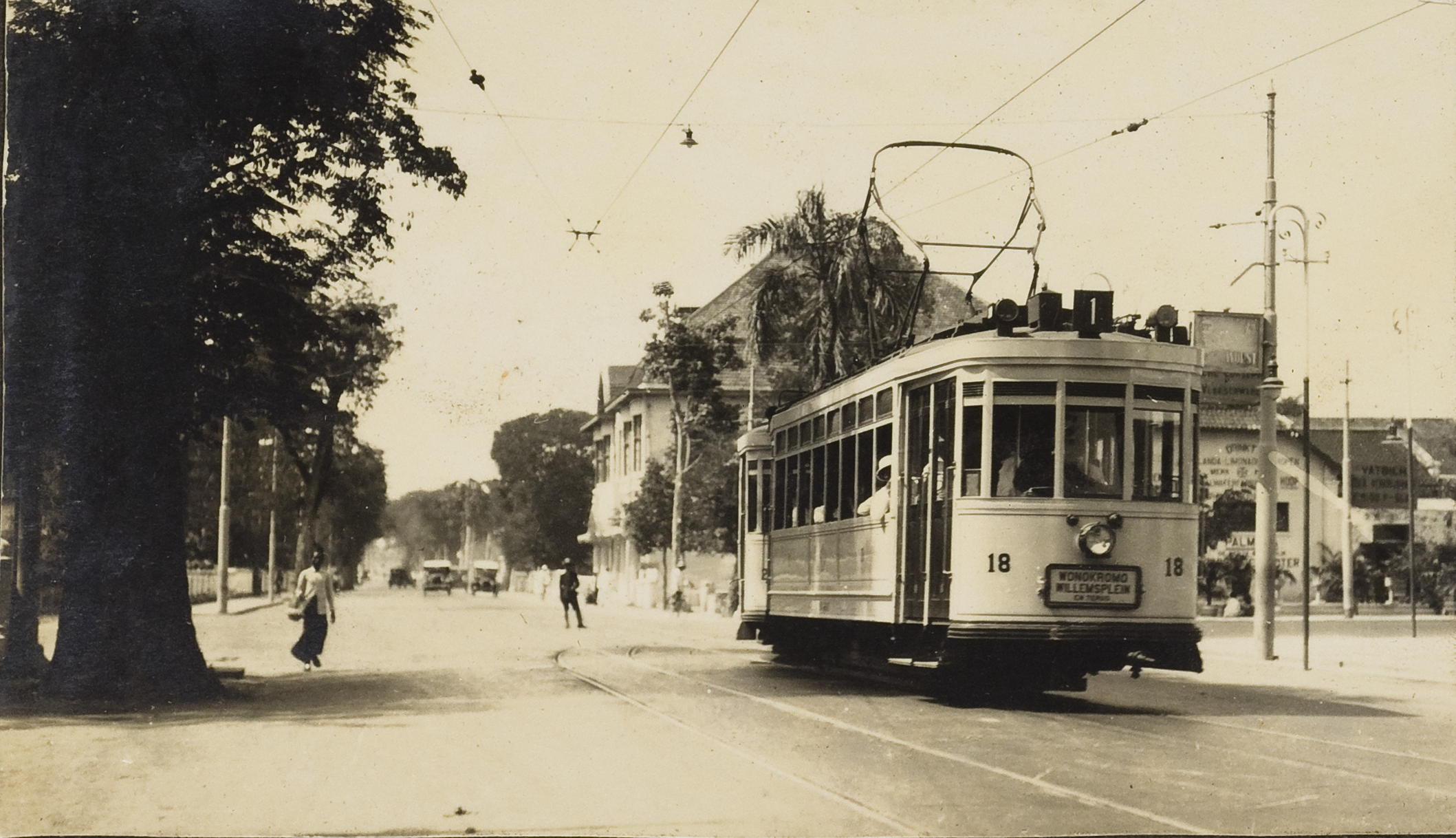
Tram on the Wonokromo and Willemsplein line in Surabaya

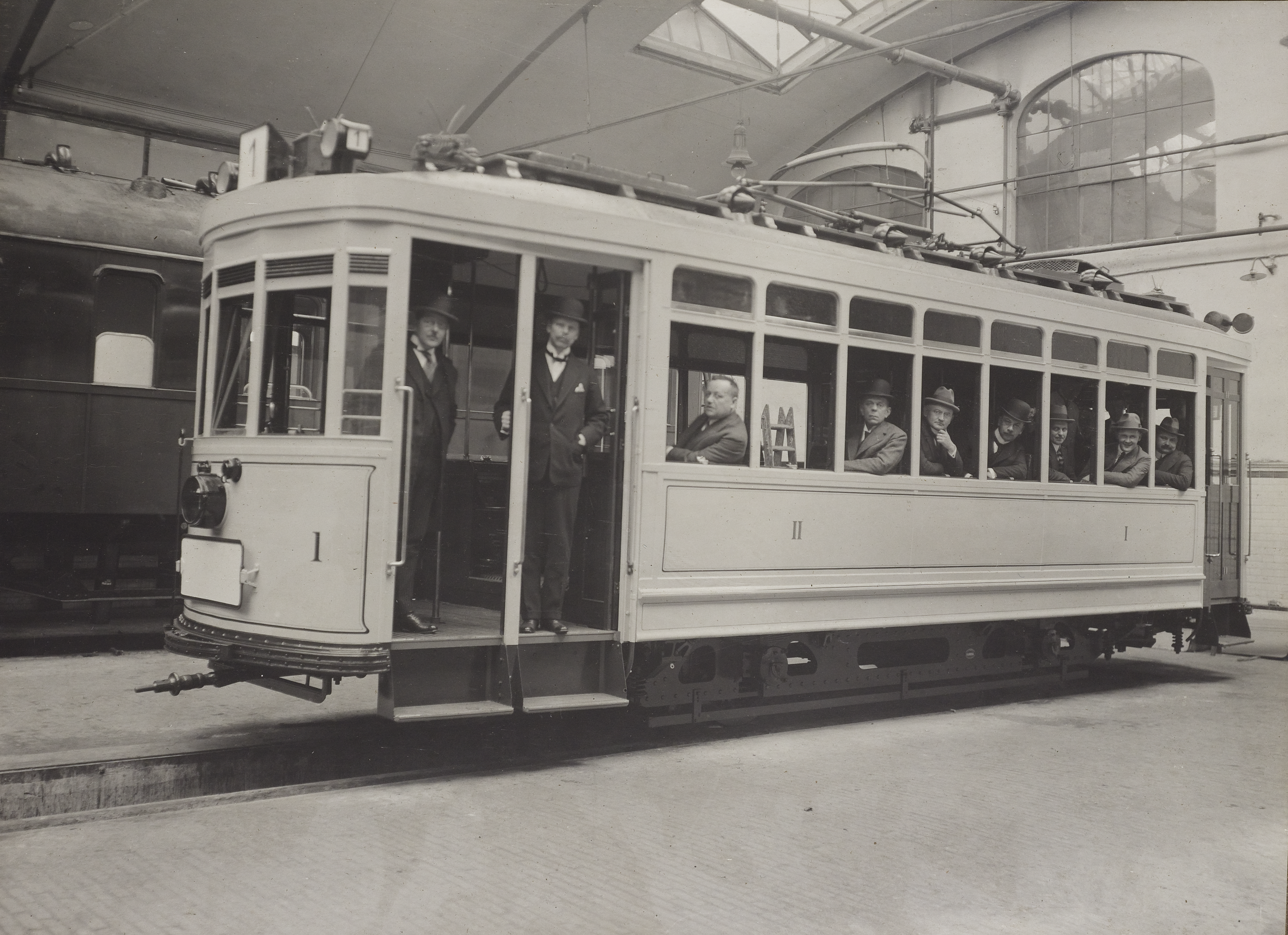
Electric tram motor carriage for the city tram network of the Oost-Java Stoomtram-Maatschappij (East Java Steam Tram Company) in Surabaya on Java, built by the Hannoversche Waggonfabrik (HaWa) in 1923 and supplied through the intervention of probably the Dutch branch of the NV formerly Ruhaak en Co. in Java

== High-speed rail ==
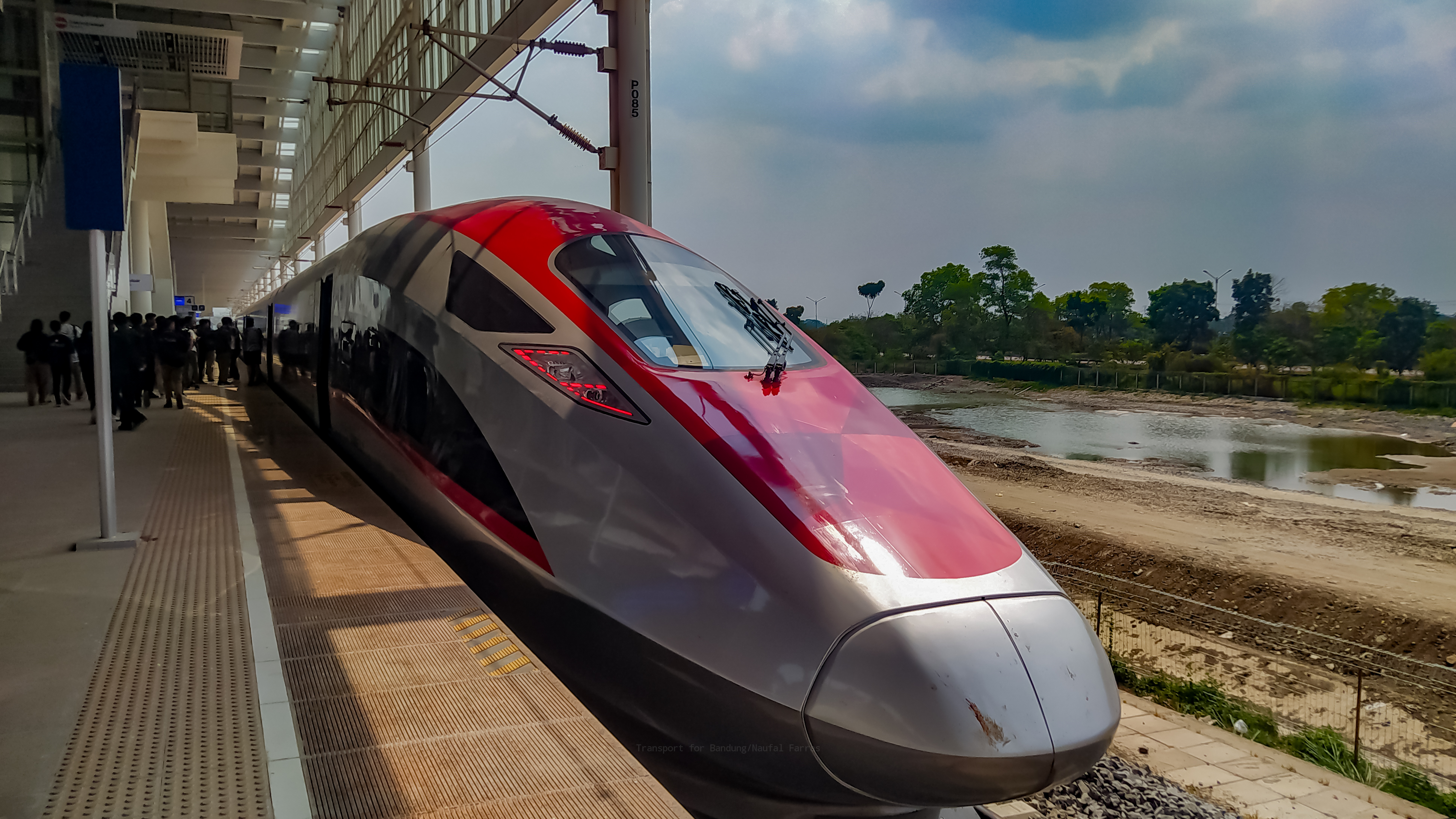
KCIC 400 in Tegalluar Station, Bandung

In recent decades, Java's transportation backbones — north coast road and railway system that serves Jakarta-Surabaya corridor, has suffered greatly from both freight and passenger congestion. The plan to build a high-speed railway system in Java has been around for many years. However, it was not until 2008 that the idea had been contemplated seriously. It was Japan International Cooperation Agency's proposal that initiated the idea to build high-speed rail for the Indonesian island of Java, linking up the densely populated corridor from the capital Jakarta to Surabaya city (covering 730 km) in East Java. Japan is eager to export their Shinkansen high-speed rail technology abroad. Following up JICA's initial study in 2012, the detailed feasibility study was concluded in 2014. In recent years, Indonesia has been undergoing a revival in railway expansion and upgrades. The high-speed rail corridors have been proposed but not implemented yet, since it was deemed too costly.

In April 2015, China had entered the race with a counter-offer to build the Jakarta-Bandung high-speed rail in Indonesia. A bid which alarmed Japan that has been nurturing the idea for years.

In July 2015, the Indonesian government announced their plan to build the high-speed rail system connecting Jakarta and Bandung, and had a competition between Japan and China. Japan and China have expressed their interest in the project; both countries had done comprehensive studies of the project.

In late September 2015, Indonesia awarded this multibillion-dollar railway project to China over Japan.

The proposed high-speed rail will connect the nation's capital Jakarta with Bandung city in neighboring West Java province, covering a distance of 150 kilometers, and is also expected to expand further, connecting to Indonesia's second largest city, Surabaya in East Java.

The project has been delayed several times, first due to careless construction that affected nearby roads, then due to coronavirus pandemic restrictions.

In December 2015, discussion for the Jakarta-Surabaya high-speed rail was initiated by the Indonesian Coordinating Minister of Maritime and Resources. Academicians from two major universities in Indonesia, and employees from Japan International Cooperation Agency, were invited to attend the discussion.

In May 2020, coordinating Economics Minister Airlangga Hartarto announced that the government had decided to extend the China-backed Jakarta-Bandung high-speed railway project to Surabaya. The line would run along a southern route to connect the Jakarta-Bandung project with Surabaya via Kertajati, where the government recently built a new airport, as well as via Surakarta and Yogyakarta. Meanwhile, Japan is working on the Java North Line Upgrading Project, which would connect Jakarta and Surabaya with a route along the northern coast of Java via Cirebon in West Java and Semarang in Central Java. A proposed travel speed of 150 km per hour for the 720-km railway connection would allow for the use of existing tracks, hence resulting in the lower development cost of about $5 billion.

The Jakarta-Bandung HSR began trial operation with passengers on 7 September 2023, and commercial operations on 2 October 2023. Indonesia and Chinese authorities discussed further plans to extend the railway across the Java island, from Jakarta to Surabaya with estimates of 3.5 hours travel time from Jakarta to Surabaya.

== Tourist rail ==
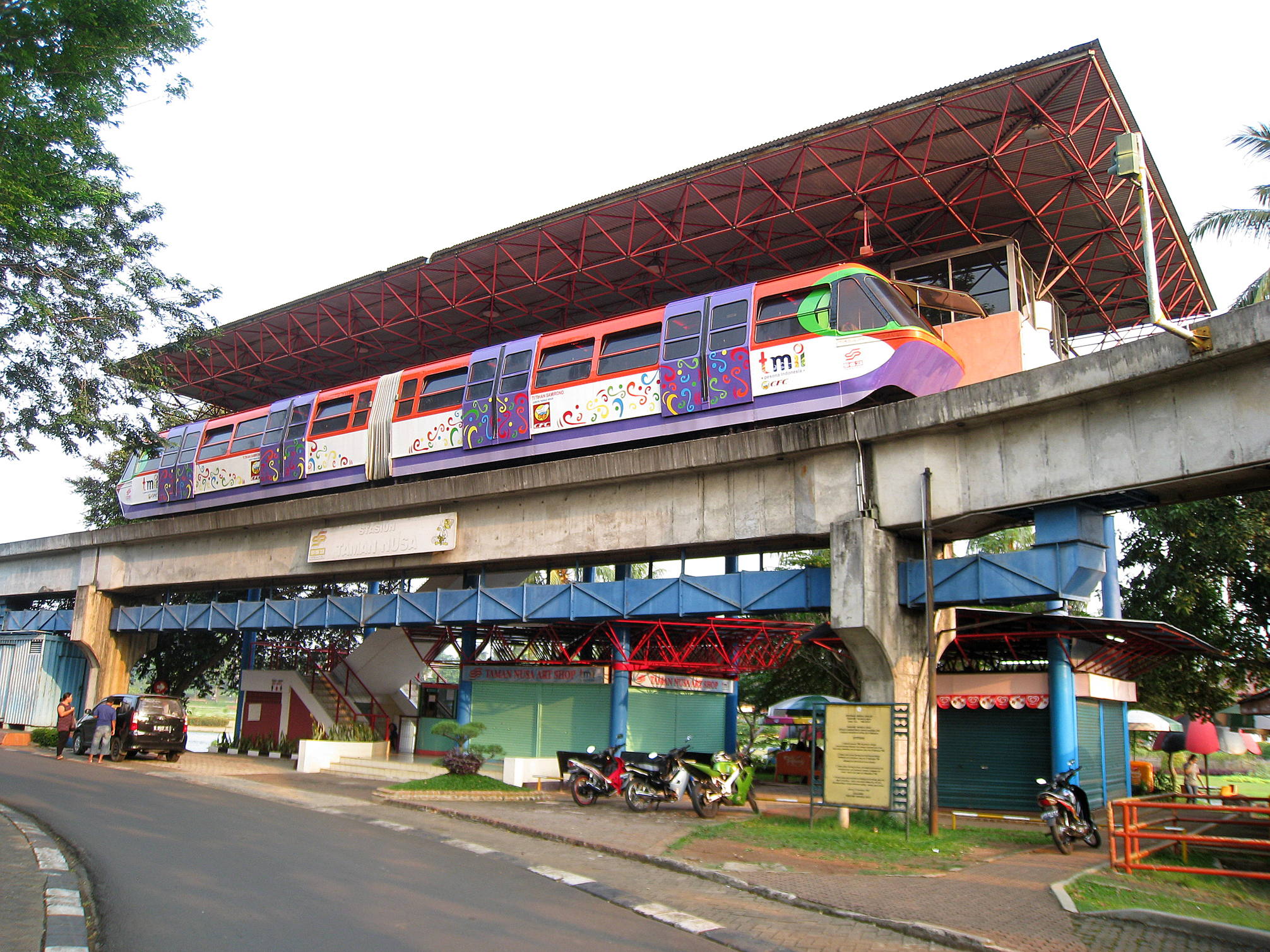
Aeromovel train at Taman Nusa Station

In Indonesia, there are several train lines that were built for tourist destinations, such as the Sebangau National Park in Central Kalimantan, and the Taman Mini Indonesia Indah (TMII) tourist mini train line in Jakarta using 600 mm track gauge. In addition to operating mini trains, TMII also operates SHS-23 Aeromovel Indonesia or Titihan Samirono, a light rail which was initially a wind-powered aeromovel.

=== Tramline ===
- The Gamplong tram line in Sleman Regency, Special Region of Yogyakarta using 1,435 mm (4 ft 8 1/2 in) track gauge
- The Epicentrum Mall tram line in Central Jakarta.

=== Minitrain ===
In Indonesia there are several tourist attractions that provide mini train services, such as in the Punden Mbah Retjo area Sidoarjo, the Lokamerta tourist attraction in Klaten, Syamsudin Noor Airport mini train, and the Forest Train at the Kembang Langit Park, Batang Regency, Central Java.

In December 2024, the Forest Line Tourist Train was launched at a new tourist attraction called Bernah De Vallei, located in Mojokerto Regency, East Java.

=== Monorail ===
In Indonesia, there are several monorails that are operated only for tourism purposes, namely the monorail system in Taman Remaja, Surabaya and in Wonderia Park, Semarang. Both monorails are powered by electricity. However, the manufacturer of the two monorails is not yet known.

== Industrial and mining railways ==
=== Sugarcane ===
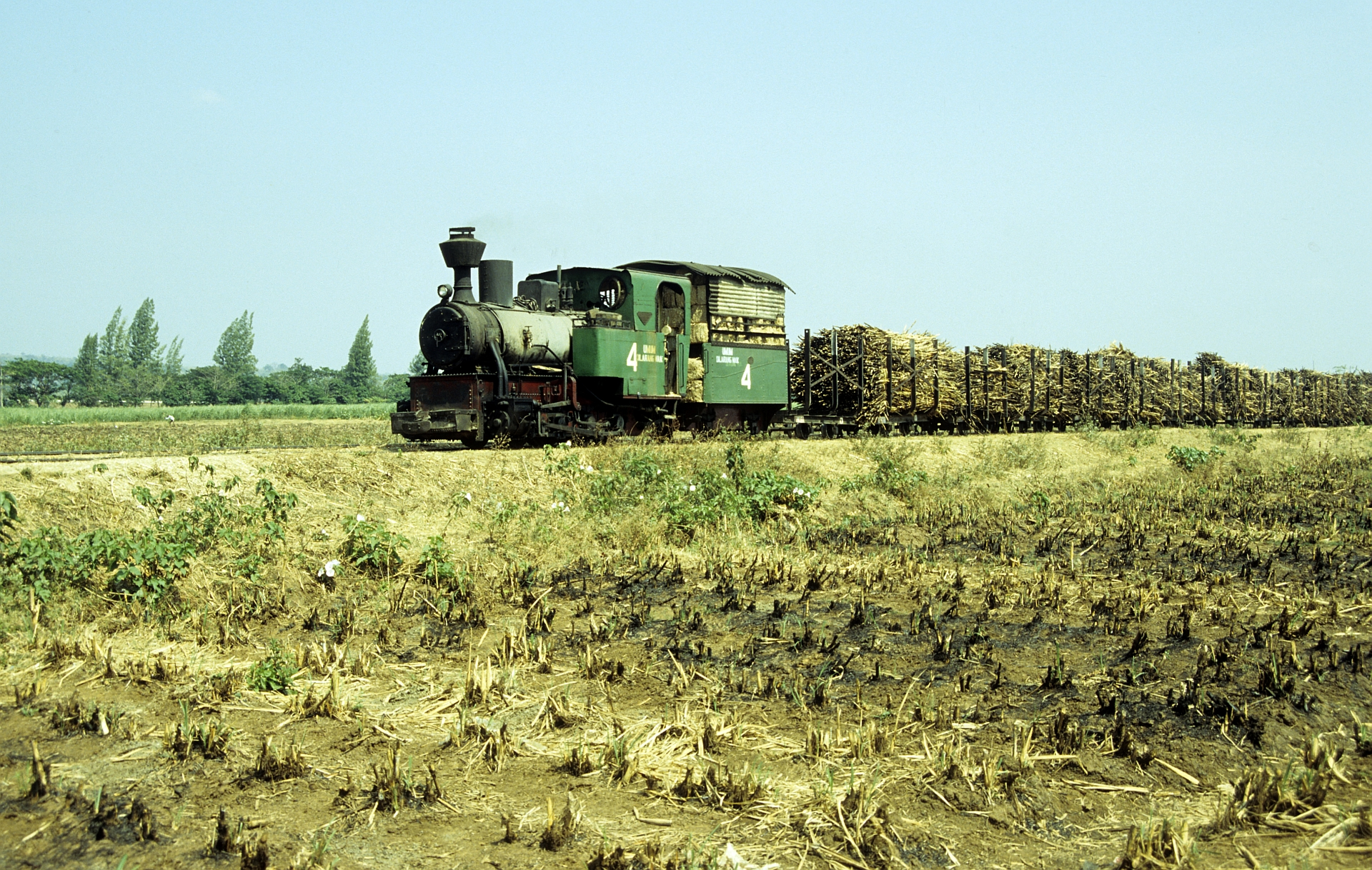
Sugar cane train hauled by steam locomotive in PG Sindanglaut, Cirebon Regency, June 2003

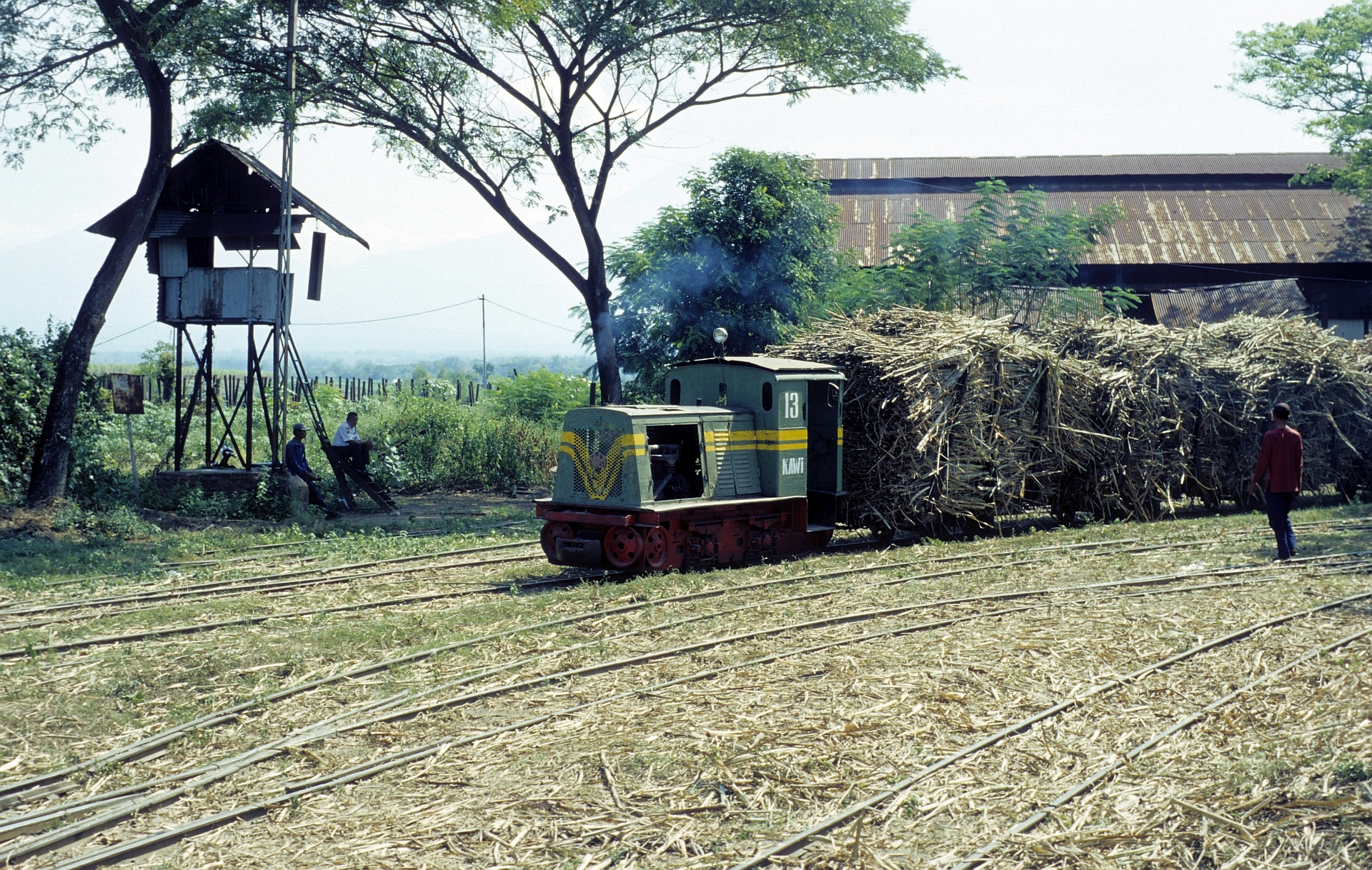
Sugar cane train hauled by diesel locomotive in PG Rejosari, Madiun Regency, June 2003

The use of trains as transport from plantations dates back to the 1800s. In the past, to transport sugarcane from plantations to sugar factories, sugar mill companies used narrow gauge trains to transport their sugarcane products. Around the 1970s, the transportation of sugarcane from plantations to factories began using trucks. Since the early 90s, transportation of sugarcane from plantations in Indonesia has been almost entirely using trucks due to lower operational costs, time efficiency, and the reduction in sugarcane land around the sugar factory area.

Due to the development of road infrastructure and train lorries getting old and slow; the use of lorry trains is diminishing. Some of the train lines are used for tourism, both steam and diesel locomotives. Most of the sugarcane rail lines are operated by PT. Perkebunan Nusantara IX.

The use of track gauges in sugar factories in Indonesia varies from place to place, for example:

- Track gauge 600 mm (1 ft 11 5/8 in), used in PG Djatiwangi Majalengka, PG Djatibarang Brebes, PG Pangka Tegal, PG Cepiring Kendal, PG Soedhono Ngawi, PG Tulangan Sidoarjo, PG Gendhing Probolinggo, and PG Pandji Situbondo.
- Track gauge 670 mm (about 2 ft 2 in), only used in PG Kadhipaten Majalengka.
- Track gauge 700 mm (2 ft 3 9/16 in), used in PG Gempol Cirebon, PG Tersana Baru Cirebon, PG Ketanggungan Barat Brebes, PG Soemberhardjo Pemalang, PG Rendeng Kudus, PG Kalibagor Banyumas, PG Gondang Winangoen Klaten, PG Kartasoera Surakarta, PG Rejosarie Magetan, PG Poerwodadie Magetan, PG Arasoe Bone Sulawesi, PG Sragie Pekalongan, and others (almost all sugar factories in Java use this track gauge).
- Track gauge 720 mm (about 2 ft 4 1/2 in), only used in PG Sindanglaut Cirebon.
- Track gauge 750 mm (2 ft 5 1/2 in), used in PG Bandjaratma Brebes, PG Pakis Baru Pati, PG Trangkil Pati, PG Ceper Baru Klaten, PG Tjolomadoe Karanganyar, and PG Tasikmadu Karanganyar.

=== Palm oil ===
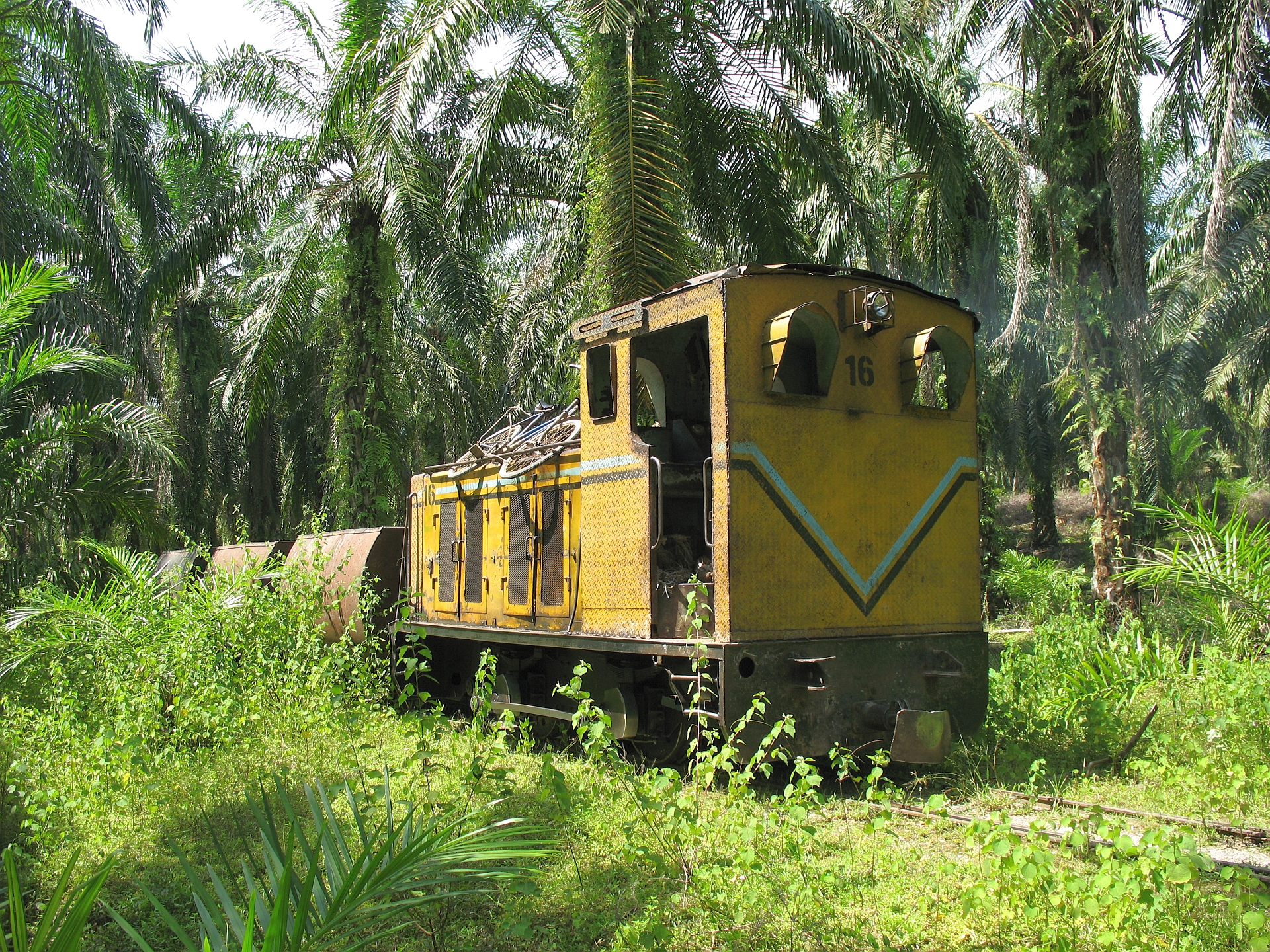
Sawit Seberang Plantations in North Sumatera

In Indonesia there are several palm oil companies that operate trains to transport palm fruit, either from oil palm plantations to mills or just as a means of passing. The oil palm carriage is commonly referred to as "Lori Muntik". The palm oil mills are spread across Sumatra and Kalimantan. The track gauge used is 700 mm (2 ft 3 9/16 in). Several large palm oil companies that use this train, including PT. Socfindo, PT. BSP, PTPN II, PTPN IV in Sumatra, Sawit Seberang Factory Railway, and several other palm oil mills.

==== Other places ====
- North Sumatra: Socfindo (Kebun Negeri Lama), PTPN IV Ajamu, and other places.
- Jambi: PKS BAH Jambi, and other places
- East Kalimantan: PKS PT. Persada Karya Sawit, PT. Waru Kaltim, PT. Sawit Kaltim Lestari, PKS 4 DSN Group, and other places.
- Central Kalimantan: PT. HPIP-LDF, PT. Antang Sawit Perkasa, PKS PT. SCP, and other places.
- South Kalimantan: Oil Palm Plantation PT. Hasnur, and other places.

=== Rubber plantations ===
In North Sumatra there is a rubber factory that still operates trains to transport rubber latex to the factory, one of which is PT Bakrie Sumatra Plantations in Kisaran. The train was pulled by a small diesel locomotive made by Hokuriku, Schöma, and several other small locomotives. The track gauge used is 600 mm (1 ft 11 5/8 in). There's also 1,067 mm (3 ft 6 in) track connecting the facility with the mainline railway.

=== Paper and pulp ===
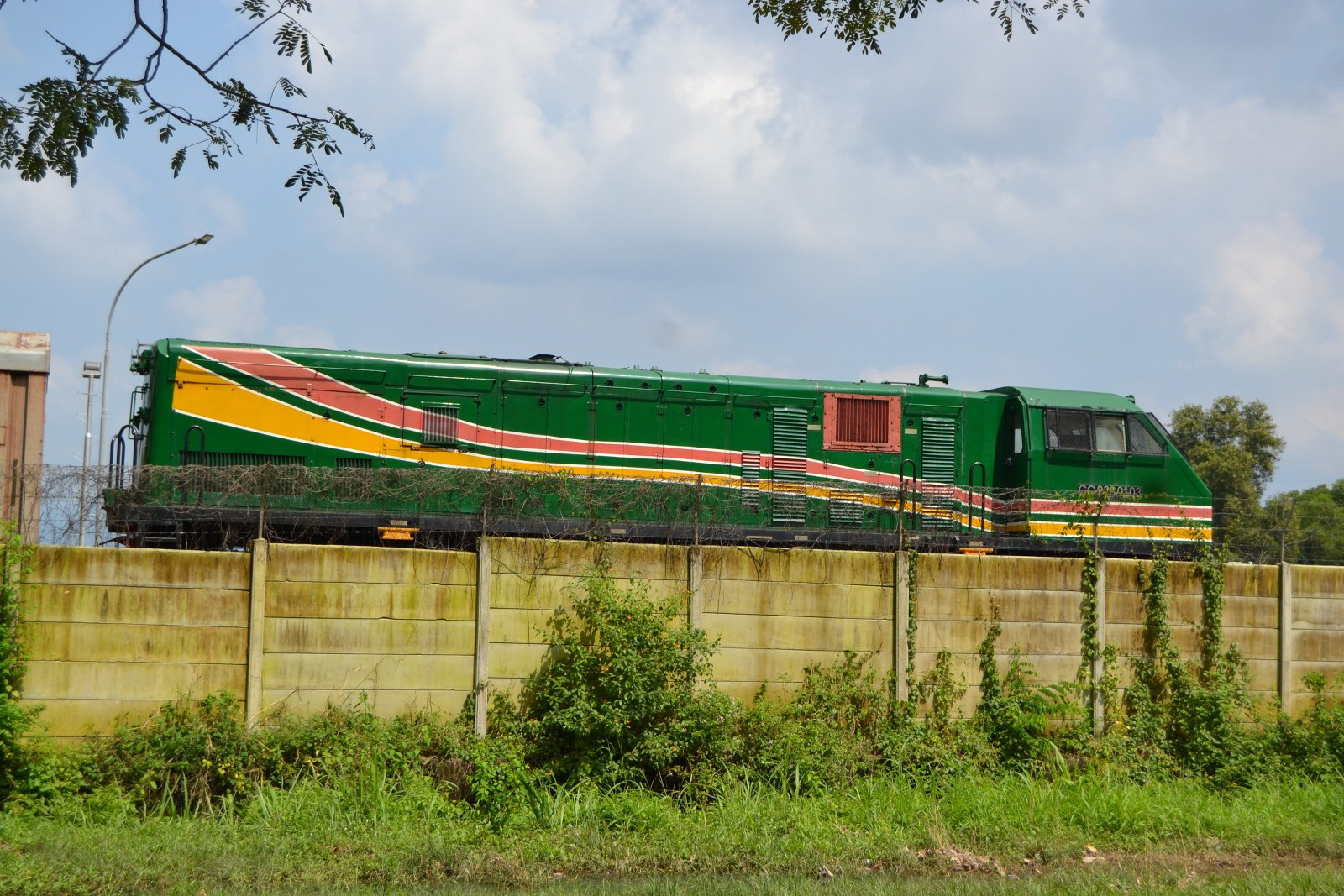
The pulp train was pulled by locomotive CC203 33R carrying wood waiting to cross the emplacement at Tarahan station.

In Indonesia there are freight trains for transporting paper and pulp which are operated by PT Kereta Api Indonesia and in collaboration with paper companies (third parties) who use the freight train services. PT KAI (and its predecessors) has collaborated with PT Kertas Leces in Probolinggo Regency and PT Tanjung Enim Lestari (TEL) Pulp and Paper. Currently, the only service that operates as a paper transport train is the PT TEL pulp train in South Sumatra with the name KA Nilahan.

=== Mining and oil transport ===
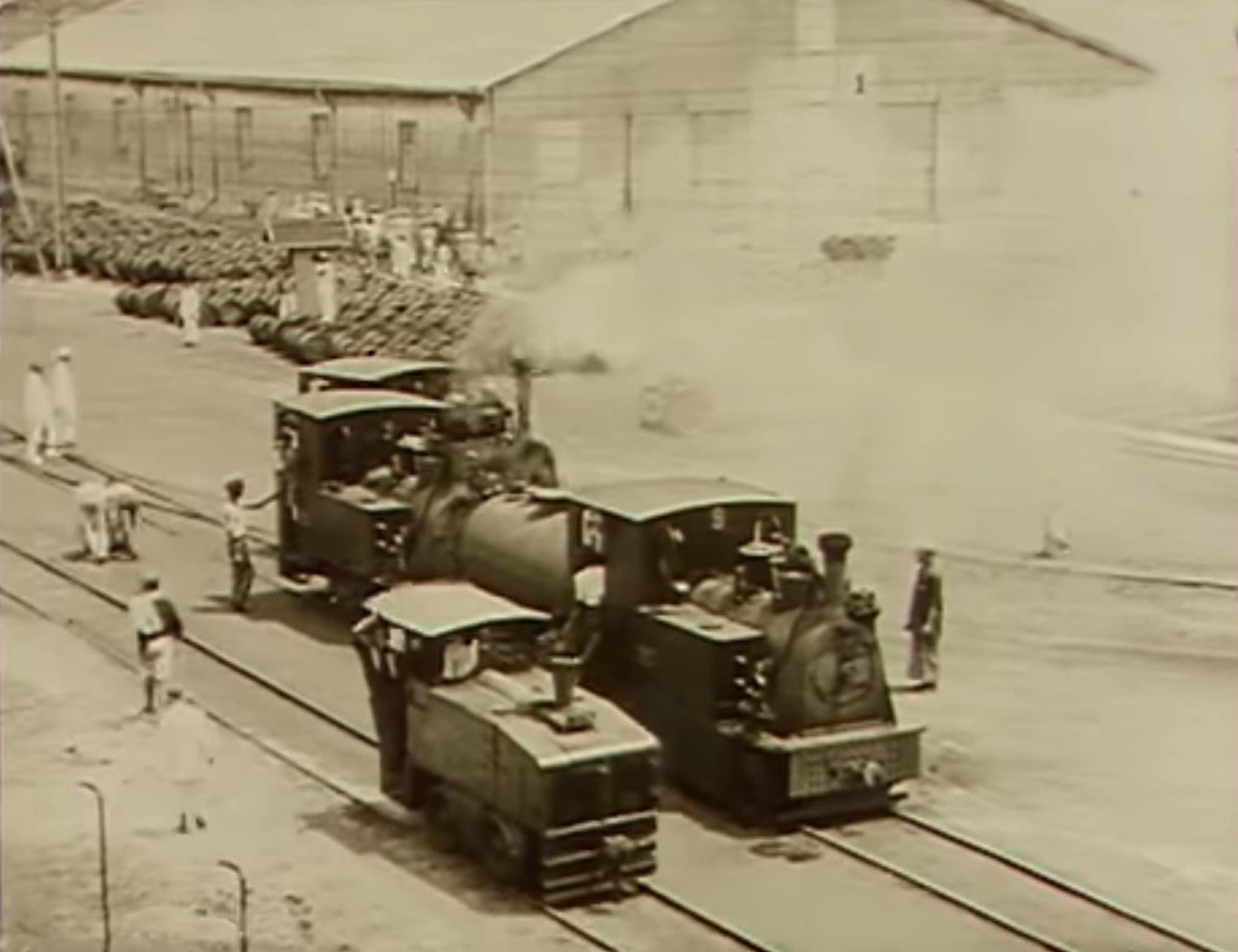
Steam and benzene locomotives in operation in the factory area at BPM Oil Company or Bataafsche Petroleum Maatschappij, a subsidiary of RDS (Royal Dutch Shell) in Balikpapan, Borneo

Before Freeport opened the mining railway line, there were other railway lines in the Indonesian part of Papua for decades. The Freeport mining train line services the Grasberg Mine in Mimika, Central Papua. The older train line services Kumbe, Malind, Merauke and South Papua. Referring to the Industrie Spoor page, the Dutch built a 700mm gauge train line and mechanized rice cultivation on 12,000 hectares of land along the Kumbe River in the 1950s, after the Second World War ended. At that time, Papua was not yet part of Indonesia and was still called Dutch New Guinea for the next decade. At the mouth of the Kumbe River there is a village called Kumbe, with the nearest big city being Merauke.

PT Freeport Indonesia, which is a mining company, operates underground mining trains to facilitate the transportation of copper, gold and silver ore materials to the processing plant location at Mile 74, Tembagapura, Mimika, Papua. The locomotive used is the MMT-M-270-BDE diesel locomotive made by Schalker Eisenhütte Maschinenfabrik, Germany.

Rail transport at the Ombilin coal mine

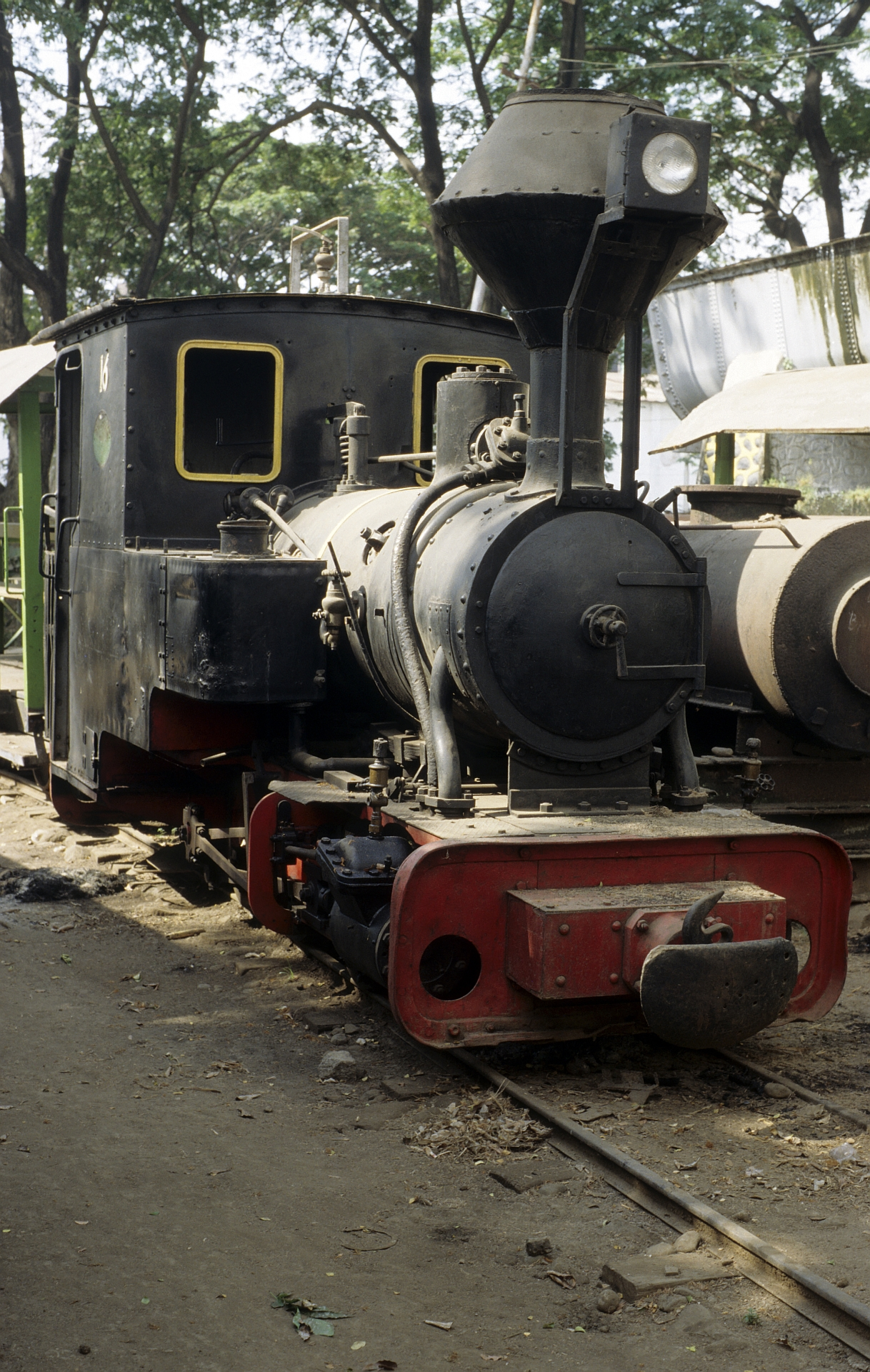
Steam locomotive ex-tin mines in Belinyu, Bangka Belitung

Cikotok, Banten formerly known as one of the gold mining areas in Indonesia is operated by PT. Antam. To facilitate the transporting of raw gold ore, a railway line was constructed. It is a small train with a track gauge of about 700mm. The gold stock was depleted in 2016 and the mine was closed. Only ruins were left, as well as the Cirotan mine monument which contained an artificial diesel locomotive Deutz-Fahr. Apart from Cikotok, PT Antam also operates mining rail lines in other areas, one of which is in Bogor, West Java

In Sebelimbingan, Pulau Laut, South Borneo there is a relic Dutch coal mine. A railway line was built from the mine site which was used to transport coal to the port and later shipped to the Netherlands. Now the mines and railroad tracks are in ruin. In several other areas in South Kalimantan mining railway lines have also been built, such as in Amuntai, Martapura and several other places. In the Pengaron area, Hulu Sungai, South Kalimantan there is also a lorry train route which is used to transport coal.

Tarakan is an island located in the northernmost part of the east coast of 'Dutch' Borneo. Under the island in 1905 oil was found. With Tarakan Koetai produced a significant percentage of the oil from the Archipelago. This proportion rose to almost 55% in 1914 to over 70% in 1925. From 1928 however, the share due to the strong growth of Sumatra's oil production. The production and processing of the oil was in Borneo in the hands of the Batavian Petroleum Maatschappij (BPM), a subsidiary of the partnership 'Royal' / Shell. In 1929 there were 4000 coolies, especially Javanese, the Tarakan island while 170 staff were European. There are also several train lines here which are used for transporting oil to the ship dock. Until around the 1950s, the oil refinery that is now owned by Pertamina in Balikpapan still operated mini trains with small track gauges to transport oil from the refinery to the port. Currently there is no relic left.

In Belinyu, Bangka Belitung, there used to be a train route for shipping tin mines

==== List of notable oil and mining railways ====
- Manganese mining railway in Kliripan, Yogyakarta
- Bayah coal mining railway in Banten
- Sawahlunto coal mining railway in West Sumatra
- Cikotok gold mining (owned by Antam) railway in Banten

==== Images ====
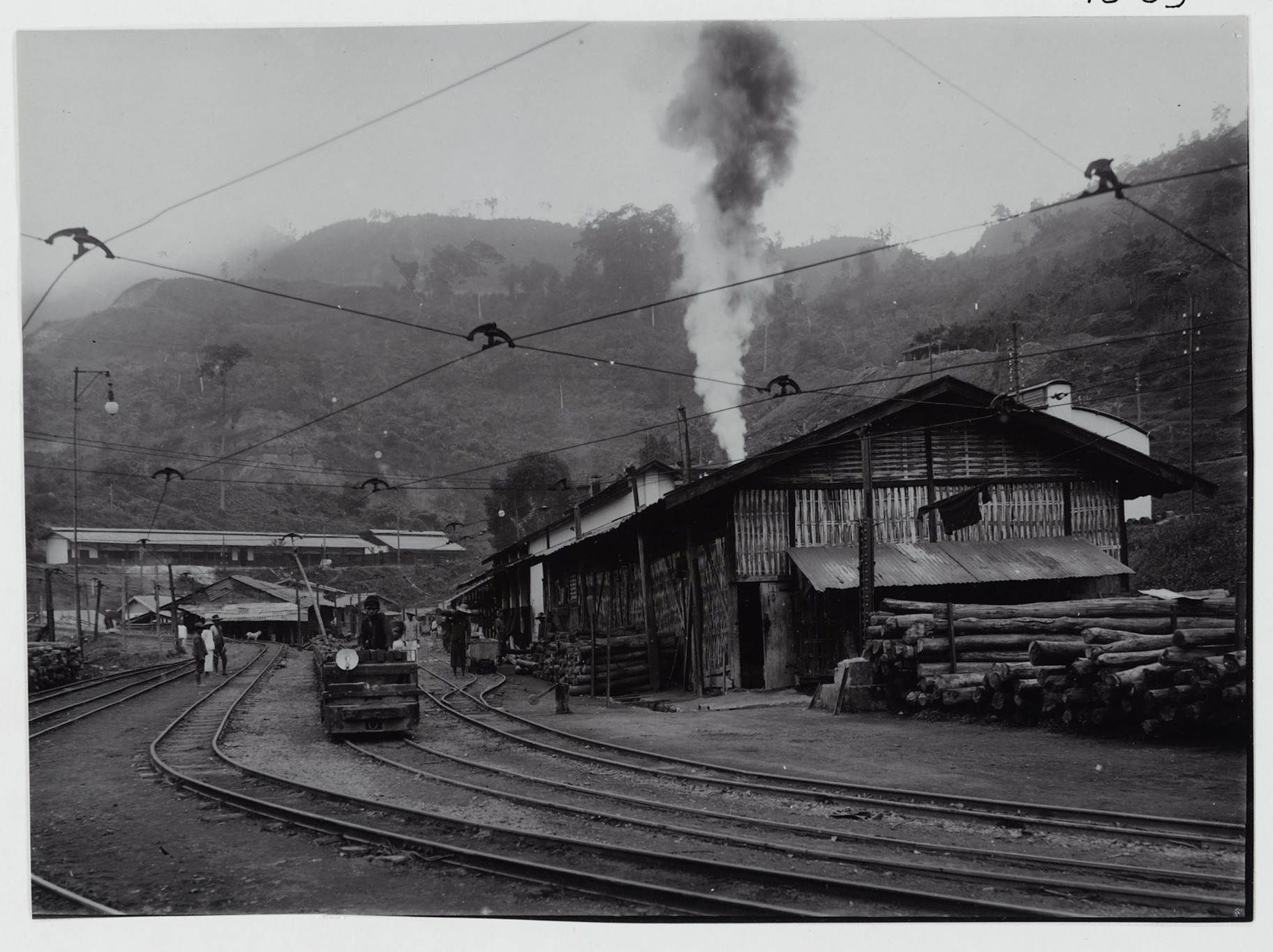
Ombilin coal mining.

West Sumatra coal mining

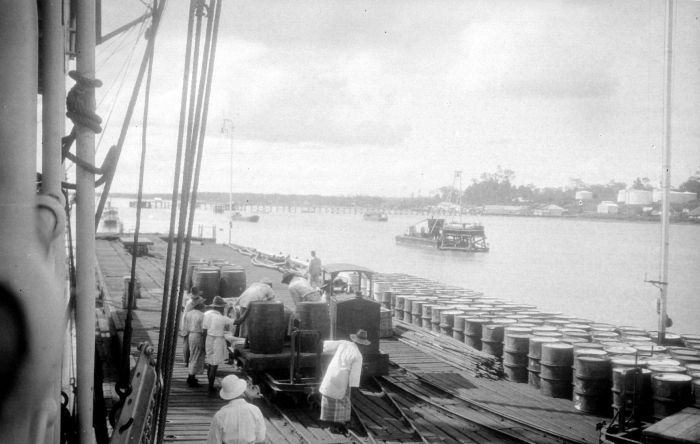
Royal Dutch Petroleum dock in the Tarakan, North Kalimantan

=== Logging ===
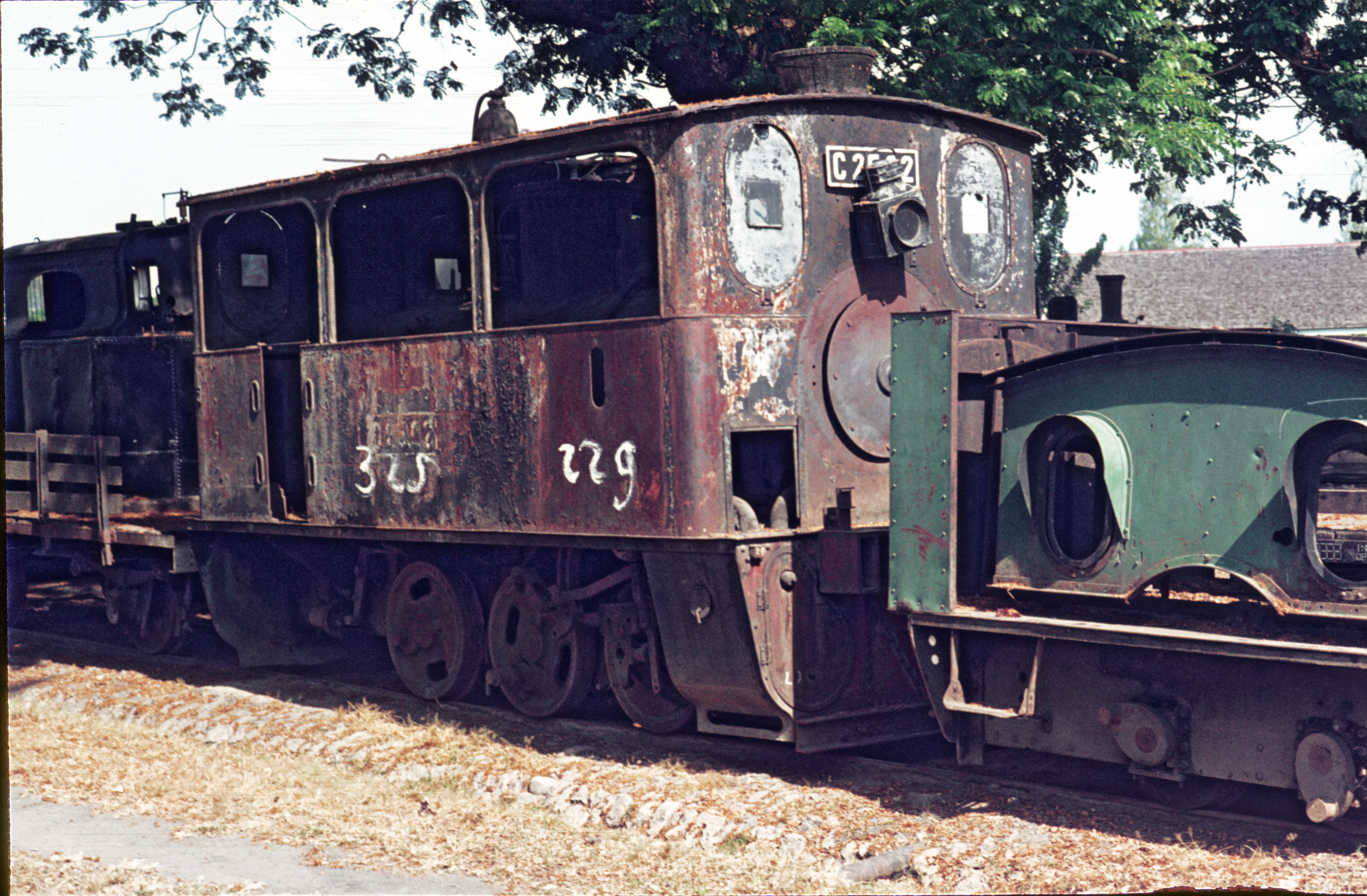
Locomotive C25 02 in Cepu Forestry Railway

Cepu Forest Railway, a 1,067 mm (3 ft 6 in) narrow gauge light logging railway that runs through teak plantations to the northwest of the town of Cepu, in Cepu district, on the boundary between Central and East Java provinces, on the island of Java in Indonesia. It is owned by Perhutani, a state-owned forestry company of Indonesia. Steam traction is still dominant.

The infrastructure used is a legacy of the colonial era. The Dutch themselves began opening teak forests as industrial forests in the 1870s. With an area of 33,000 hectares, Cepu teak wood became a high-value commodity. To speed up the transportation of wood, the railway line began to be built in 1915. Throughout the 20th century, this line operated to transport wood from Gubug Payung to Batokan. To promote Cepu tourism, Perhutani began upgrading this railway line to a tourist railway in 1990. This line experienced many route cuts and occasionally operated in 2002, due to old infrastructure. The Cepu tour locomotive was finally able to be turned on again regularly on 17 January 2018, using a diesel locomotive. Currently, the Cepu tour locomotive route is served using a diesel locomotive with a fare of IDR Rp.15,000.00 per person one way. In addition to regular services, Perhutani also provides steam and diesel train rental packages.

=== Gallon transport ===
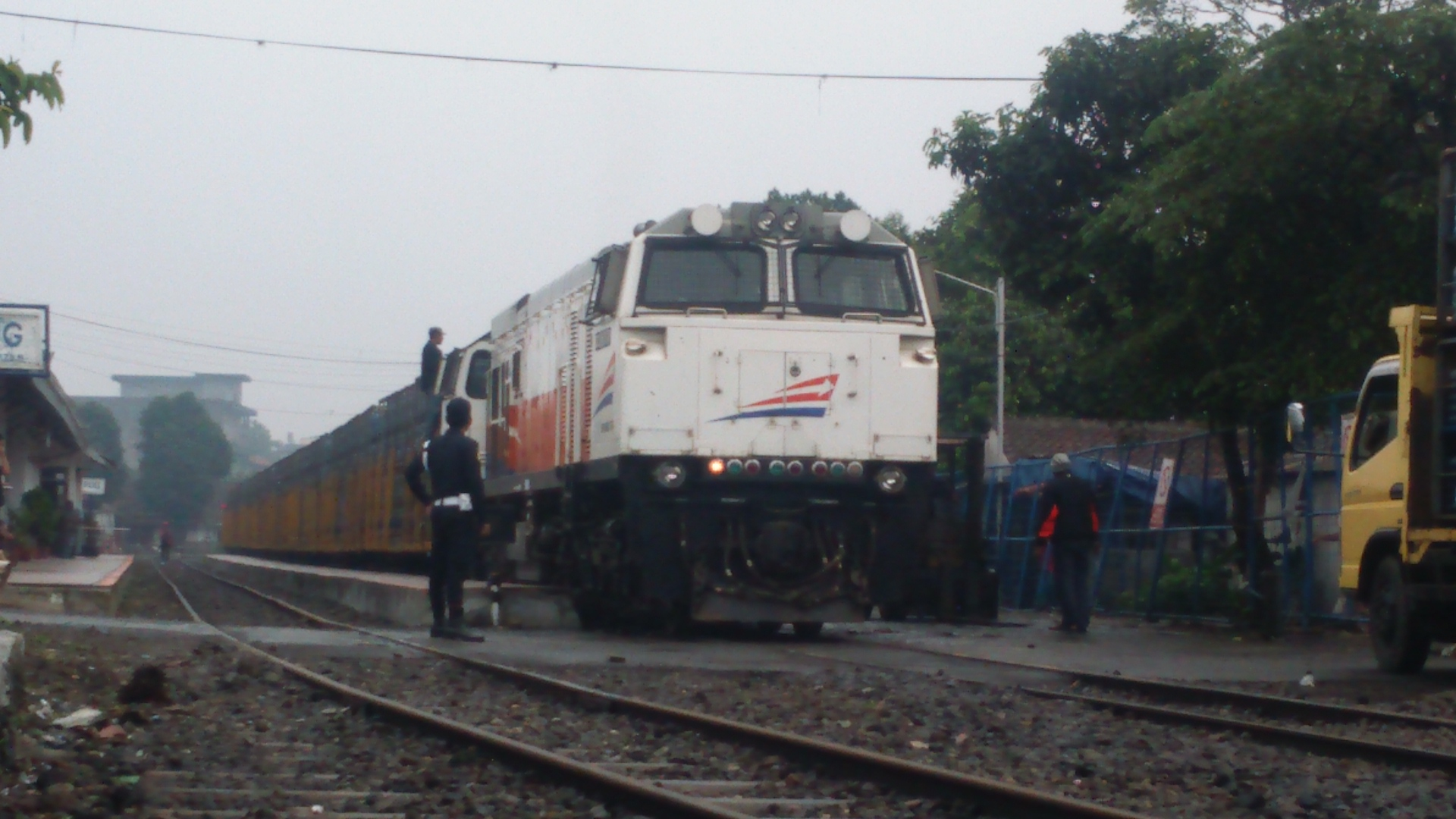
Arrival of Aqua Freight Train at Cicurug Station Stabling Platform 2

The Aqua Gallon transport train is a freight train that transports Aqua (mineral water) gallons owned by PT Aqua Golden Mississippi Tbk, as a form of cooperation between PT Aqua Golden Mississippi Tbk and PT Kereta Api Indonesia. This cooperation has been carried out since 18 June 2014. This train was launched to reduce congestion on the Bogor-Sukabumi highway which has become increasingly severe due to the back and forth activities of large trucks carrying Aqua gallons. This train is one of several freight trains in Indonesia.

=== Cement transport ===
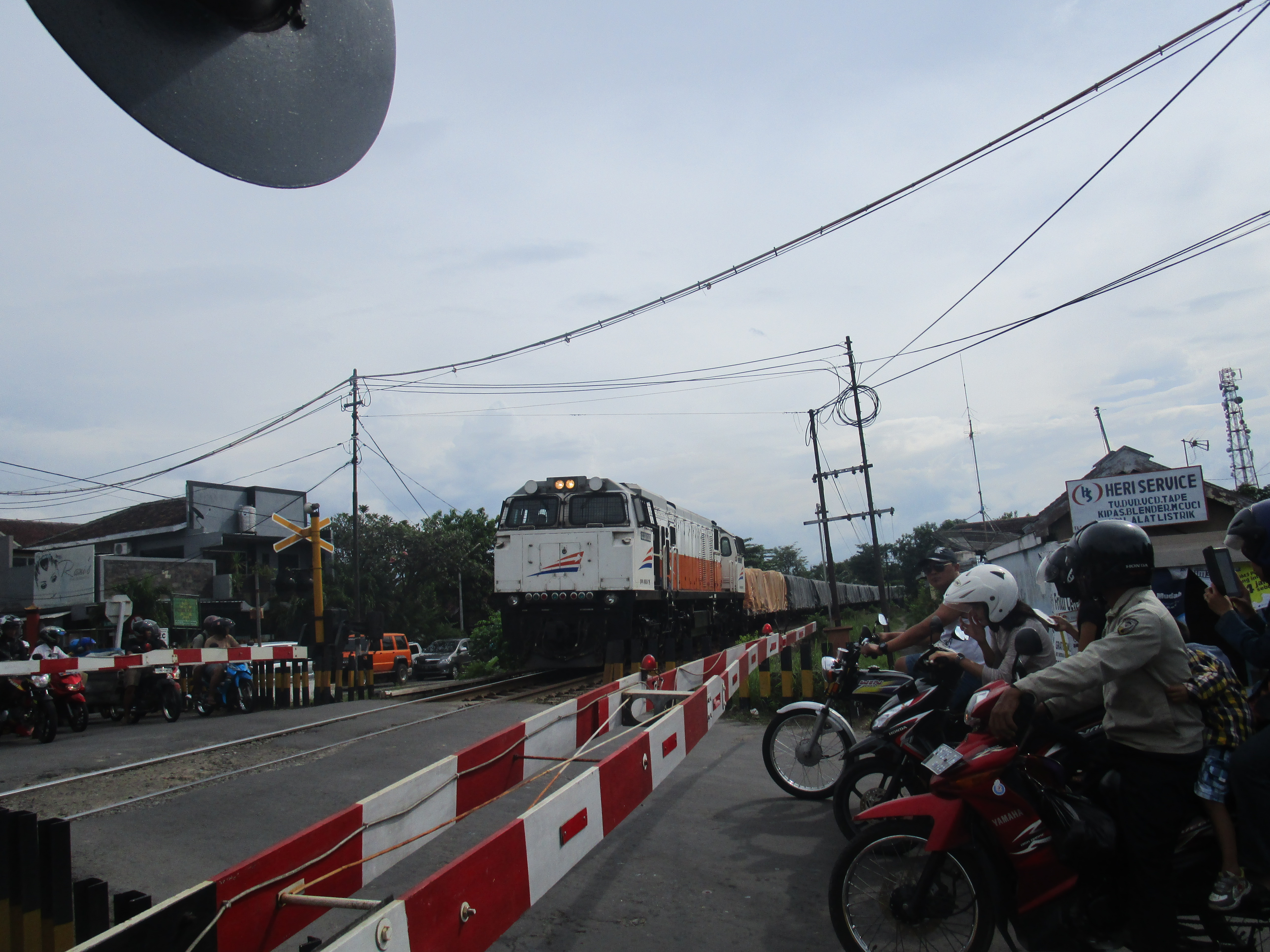
The Indocement train to Kalimas departs from Madiun station, and passes the eastern bend of Madiun station.

Indocement train is a freight train that transports Semen Tiga Roda produced by PT Indocement Tunggal Prakarsa Tbk. ("Indocement"), as a form of cooperation between Indocement and PT Kereta Api Indonesia through KAI Logistik. This train is one of several cement transport trains in Indonesia. Indocement has factory facilities in Palimanan and Citeureup, they use trains because their factory is located not far from Arjawinangun Station and Nambo Station. Indocement cement train started operating in 2012 with its first route, namely Arjawinangun–Purwokerto, then on 4 December 2013, the Nambo–Kalimas route was operated. Since then, the train route has continued to grow. In order not to interfere with passenger train travel, this train usually runs at night.

=== Coil steel transport ===
Coil Steel Transport Train is a freight train transportation that is the result of cooperation between PT Kereta Api Indonesia (Persero) and PT Krakatau Bandar Samudera in transporting products produced by PT Krakatau Steel (Persero) Tbk in the form of rolled steel sheets (coils) from its factory in Cilegon to Kalimas, Surabaya. Transportation of Coil Steel by Train is actually very profitable for the company itself because it is considered faster. If using a truck, the journey takes up to 7 days. While if using a train, the travel time is only 3 days to reach the customer's destination. Practically, PT Krakatau Bandar Samudera can distribute its commodities in much larger volumes than before. By using 20 Flatcar with a capacity of 42 tons, Krakatau Steel can transport 600 tons of steel, which is equivalent to 15 40-ton container trailers.

== Other railway ==
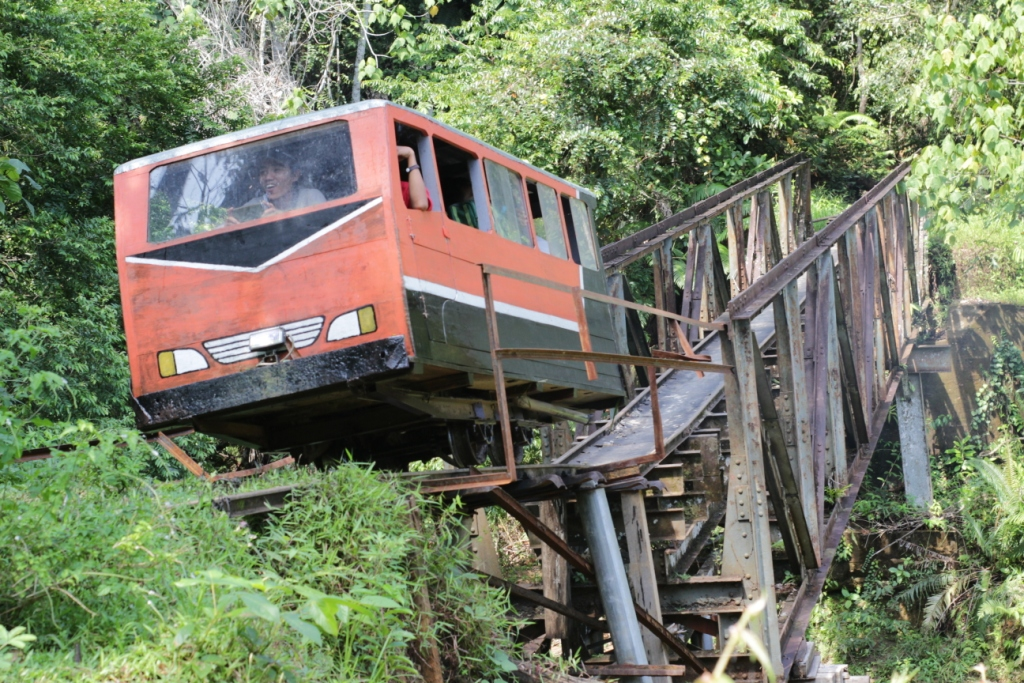
Molek-Motor Lori Express, the only means of transportation to Lebong Tandai Village, North Bengkulu Regency in Bengkulu Province. This vehicle is a modification of a century-old Dutch lorry wreck. The remains of an old gold mine called Mijn Maatschappij Simau which operated for more than 40 years, before Indonesia's independence.

In Indonesia, there are several rail lines that are only used for infrastructure development projects, such as power plants. Among them:

- Lamajan hydroelectric power plant in Bandung
- Jatiluhur Dam rail lines
- Ketenger hydroelectric power plant in Banyumas

=== Village railway ===
- Motor Lori Ekspres (Molek) in Bengkulu Province
  - Molek has a long history because its rails were built during the Dutch era. Molek is a legendary transportation heritage of the Dutch. The rails used by the community to transport passengers and logistics from Air Tenang Village to Lebong Tandai have been built since 1904. In the past, the Dutch used the rails to transport gold from the Lebong Tandai area. It is said that Lebong Tandai was a gold-producing area with many gold mines there. After Indonesia's independence, the rails were temporarily out of service. However, the route was reopened by residents in 1948 until now. Currently, the function of the vehicle is used to send logistics from one village to another. Molek has a unique shape. Its length is about 3 meters while its width is only 1.5 meters. In addition to sending logistics, Molek is also used to transport passengers. Molek is very useful because it runs on rails. Meanwhile, the roads in the area are still very inadequate, so that the delivery of logistics and passenger transportation cannot use vehicles such as cars and motorbikes. Molek uses iron rails as a walking platform, so its condition is very durable and does not wear out with age. Molek walked through the dense forest to the bridge that was already vulnerable to collapse.

== List of all locomotives in Indonesia ==
Locomotives are the main means of transportation in passenger trains or freight cars. In Indonesia, there are many locomotives weighing more than 50 tons, which are certainly capable of pulling quite long trains.

As the main train operator in Indonesia, PT Kereta Api Indonesia (Persero) or KAI has hundreds of heavy locomotives spread across Java and Sumatra. In fact, there are a number of locomotives that do not operate on Java because they are so heavy.

=== List of maintenance railway fleet ===
Operated by Ministry of Transportation :

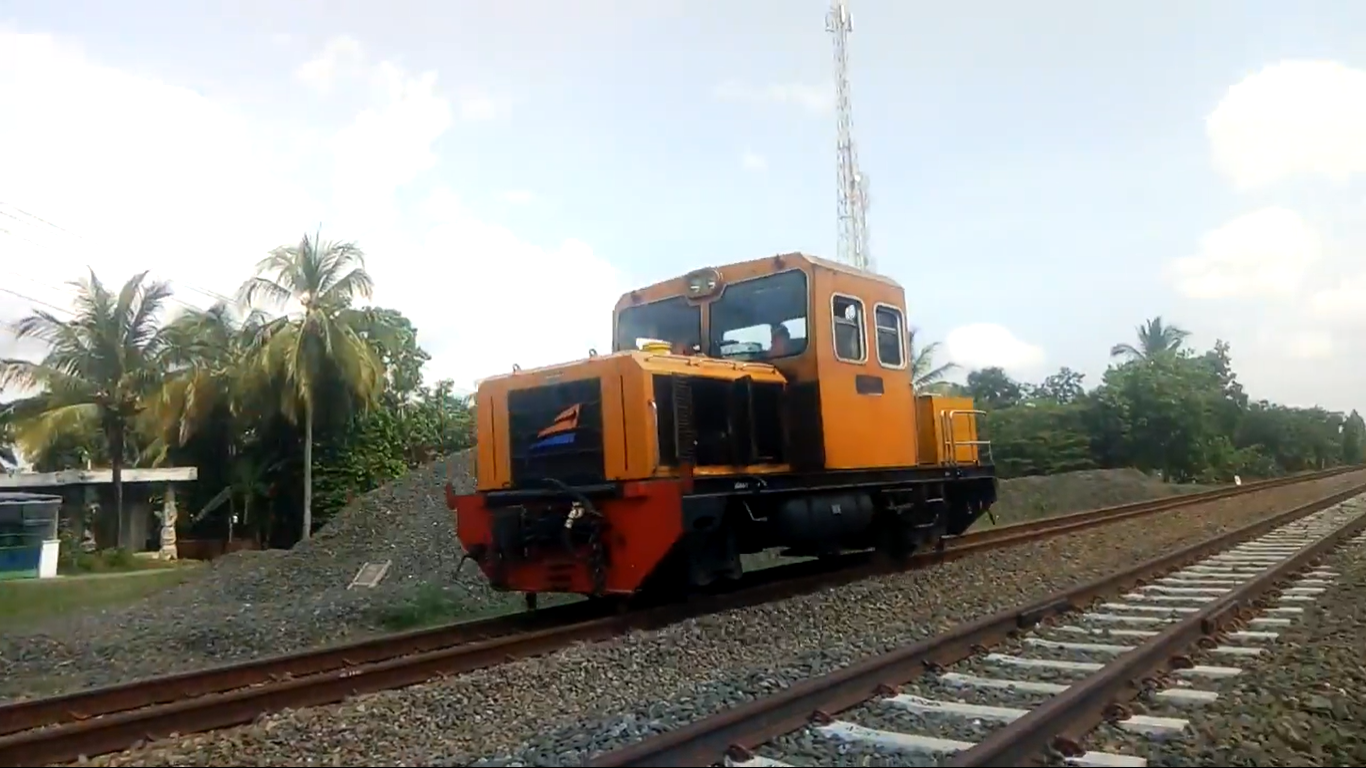
Track Motor Car (TMC) made by Industri Kereta Api

- Track Motor Car
- Plasser & Theurer
- Tata Motors (road car converted to inspection rail)
- Mercedes-Benz Unimog

== Future plans ==
=== Railway ===
==== Industrial railway project ====
A coal mining company in Central Kalimantan, PT. SUS is building a train line connecting Katingan – Gunung Mas. This line is 92 km long and will be used as a special railway line for mining transportation.

=== Monorail project (Replaced by LRT(for Jakarta)) ===
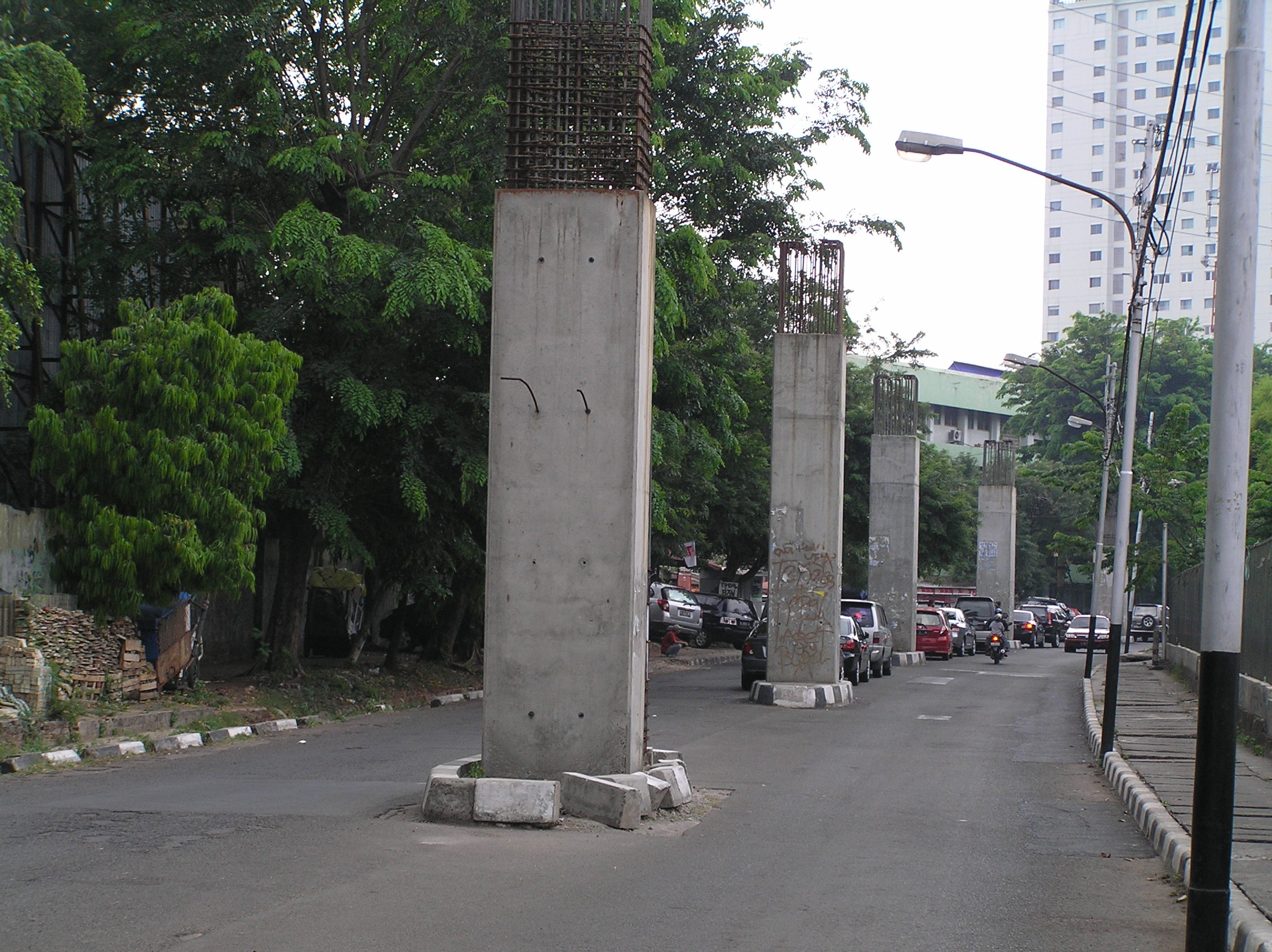
Support pillars for the stalled monorail project in October 2008

- Jakarta: Jakarta Monorail, the project was initially awarded in 2003 to Malaysian company MTrans, the technology owner and builders of the KL Monorail. Construction started in June 2004 but was halted after only a few weeks after the funds for the project stopped. MTrans' memorandum of understanding (MoU) was then cancelled after MTrans didn't respond adequately, and the MoU did not move towards a formal agreement. In March 2008, developers PT Jakarta Monorail officially abandoned the project. Then, in April, numerous pylons to support the future track were illegally demolished, probably by metal thieves. In September 2011, the Jakarta administration called off the monorail project with a maximum Rp.204 billion ($23.3 million) compensation to PT Jakarta Monorail.
- Surabaya: The monorail in Surabaya is planned to connect Kejawan City to Lidah Kulon, along 23 kilometers. This monorail route will have 24 stations.

=== Metro Capsule ===
Bandung Institute of Technology (ITB) with PT PP Infrastruktur, PT Trekka, PT KKM, PT Indoserako Sejahtera, and PT Metro Putra Perkasa developed the metro capsule, an electric-based public transportation. With a length of approximately 9m, a width of 2m, and a height of 4m. One Metro Capsule carriage can accommodate 50 passengers, and it is planned that in one series there will be 11 carriages.

=== Tram project ===
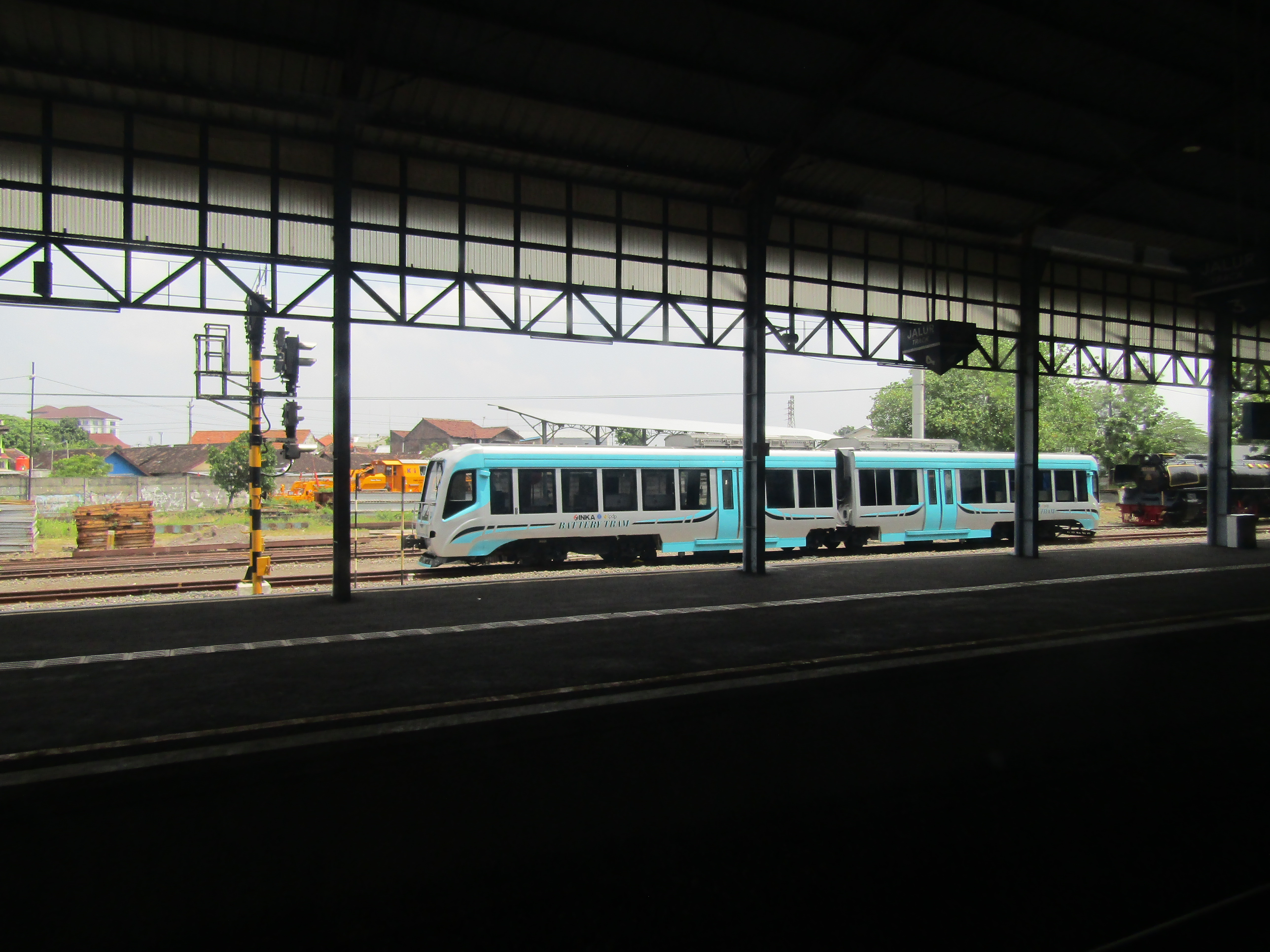
INKA battery tram

Industri Kereta Api in collaboration with the Bandung Institute of Technology (ITB) will conduct a battery-powered autonomous tram trial in Surakarta Lines, Central Java. This autonomous tram is designed to operate automatically in a mixed traffic environment. Various sensors such as cameras, radars, are installed to detect objects around. The tram is driven by an electric motor supported by a 200 kWh battery, which can travel up to 90 km on a single charge. Bogor has a project plan to build a tram system. The tram project will be built around the city of Bogor with four corridors. One of the corridors is around 9 km long and requires a budget of around 1.8 trillion charge. The city government has even prepared a special lane for trams on the Otista Bridge.

=== Light rail project ===
- Bandung: LRT Bandung Raya is a project to build an Integrated Highway (LRT) that will connect the Bandung Raya area with the Jakarta-Bandung High-Speed Train (Whoosh) Station in Tegalluar. This project aims to overcome traffic congestion in Bandung.
- Surabaya: The Surabaya City Government through the Surabaya City Government announced an ambitious plan to immediately realize the LRT (Integrated Highway) project that will connect Surabaya with four surrounding cities, namely Sidoarjo, Gresik, Mojokerto, and Lamongan. This project will be fully carried out by the central government through the State Budget (APBN), with the aim of accelerating the development of integrated mass transportation infrastructure in the East Java region.
- Bali: LRT Bali or Bali Urban Subway is a Light Rail Transit (LRT) development project in Bali. This project will connect I Gusti Ngurah Rai Airport with tourist areas in Bali.
  - Construction phases :
    - Phase 1A will connect I Gusti Ngurah Rai Airport with Sunset Road
    - Phase 2 will connect I Gusti Ngurah Rai Airport with Jimbaran, Unud, and Nusa Dua
    - Phase 3 will connect Kuta Sentral Parkir with Sesetan, Renon, and Sanur
    - Phase 4 will connect Renon with Sukawati and Ubud

=== MRT project ===
- Greater Bali: The plan to build mass rapid transit (Bali MRT), a based transportation in Bali has entered a new phase. PT Sarana Bali Dwipa Jaya (SDBJ) has appointed PT Bumi Indah Prima (BIP) as the main investor for the project, whose full name is Bali Urban Rail and Associated Development or later called Bali Subway. The laying of the first stone or groundbreaking for the MRT project in Bali will be carried out in September 2024. The subway project is claimed to be a solution to traffic congestion on the Island of the Gods.

== Laws and regulations ==
Before creating their own laws and regulations, Indonesian rail transport laws and regulations were inherited from Dutch East Indies laws, including:

- Algemeene Regelen betreffende den Aanleg en de Exploitatie van Spoor en Tramwegen, bestemd voor Algemeen Verkeer in Nederlandsch-Indië (Dutch East Indies Construction and Operation of Railways and Tramways for General Traffic Act)
- Algemeene Bepalingen betreffendede Spoor en Tramwegen (Railways and Tramways Act)
- Bepalingen betreffende den Aanleg en het Bedrijf der Spoorwegen (Regulation on Construction and Operation of Railways)
- Bepalingen voor de stadstramwegen (Regulation on Urban Tramways)
- Bepalingen Landelijke Tramwegen (Regulation on Rural Tramways)
- Bepalingen betreffende het Vervoer over Spoorwegen (Regulation on Transport by Rail)
- Industriebaan Ordonnantie (Industrial Railways Ordinance)

In 1992, President Suharto passed the 1992 Indonesian Railways Act No. 13, replacing all the regulations above. On the end of March 2007, the People's Representative Council had passed the current law replacing 1992 act, the 2007 Indonesian Railways Act. In the current law, private and regional investors have a chance to manage rail transport, so the domination and monopoly of the KAI were abolished.

== Indonesian railway signaling and sign (semboyan) ==
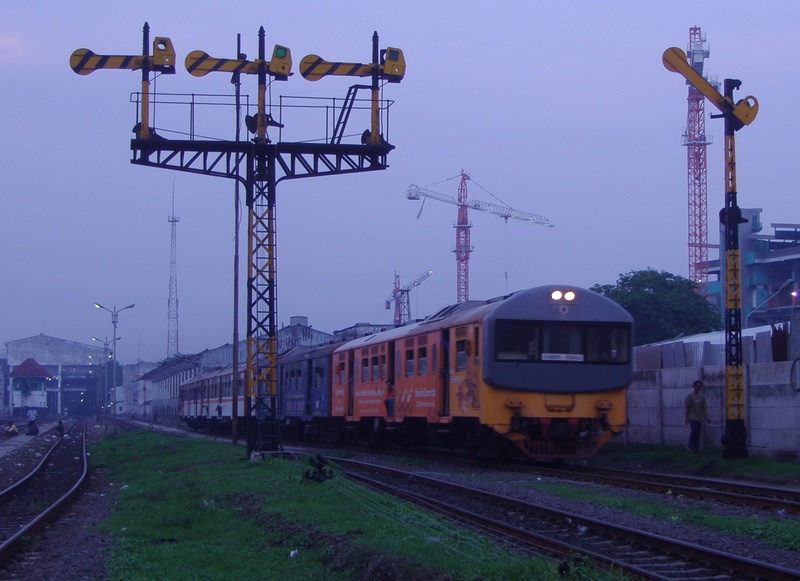
Semaphore signals on railway signal poles showing Signals 5 and 7

Signaling and railway signal in Indonesia (semboyan in Indonesian) are defined as messages or signs in the form of hand signals, voice, shapes, color, or light placed in a place with a certain meaning to regulate and/or control train operations. Railway signal can be in the form of commands or prohibitions demonstrated through officers, or tools in the form of shapes, colors, or sounds including signals, signals, and signs; or notifications through marks about track conditions, distinctions, boundaries, and certain instructions.

Railway signaling in Indonesia is influenced by Dutch signaling system and follows the Utrecht Convention on Railway Signaling, especially the Siemens & Halske signaling, Alkmaar type signaling and the "krian" tebeng, which became the foundation of modern Indonesian mechanical signaling. Electrical signaling began to be introduced in Java in the 1970s when signaling installations at Bandung Station and Solo Balapan were carried out by PNKA/PJKA and Siemens Mobility. In the 1980s and continuing to accelerate until now, many mechanical signaling systems have changed to electrical for several reasons such as operational efficiency and increased train traffic related to the construction of double track.

The influence of Dutch signaling in Indonesian railways is outlined in Regulation 3 on Signals (drafted during the Staatsspoorwegen period and refined by the Railway Service), which was later revised in 2010 with Service Regulation 3 on Signals. The old regulation had different interpretations of colors, namely white as a sign of "safe", green as a sign of "limited speed", and red as a "danger sign". However, Service Regulation 3 regulates the color green as a sign of "safe", and yellow as "limited speed". This regulation also influenced the Ministry of Transportation in drafting PM No. 10 of 2011 concerning Technical Requirements for Railway Signaling Equipment.

== Notable accidents and incidents ==
- 25 December 1944 – A passenger train derailed into the valley around Lembah Anai, Padang Panjang, West Sumatra. A total of 200 people were killed and 250 were seriously injured. This train accident in Lembah Anai is the worst train accident in Indonesia and number seven in the world, in history.
- 23 March 1945 – Another train crashed at the Lembah Anai bridge, West Sumatra, possibly due to loss of brakes. Casualties were estimated to be in the hundreds.
- 28 May 1959 – At 07:30 am, the Tjepat 31 train with relation Banjar-Bandung train crashed and rolled over at km 242+5/6 of the Trowek (now Cirahayu)-Cipeundeuy section. There are 2 versions that mention the cause of this accident, 1. Because of the train's push after the train departed, 2. Someone suddenly disconnected the train. The train rolled until it toppled over. This incident resulted in 185 deaths and 200 injuries.
- 20 September 1968 – At around 7:30 am there was a collision between Train 406 and Train 309 in the area of Ratu Jaya, Cipayung, Depok. This incident resulted in 116 people killed and 84 people injured. This accident is known as the Ratujaya 1968 train collision.
- 21 January 1981 – At 03:32 am, the Senja IV train departing from Purwokerto Station and the Maja train departing from Kroya Station collided in the Gunung Payung area, near the Serayu River Bridge. After the collision, both CC 201 locomotives were scrapped in 1986 because it was not possible to revive them.
- 19 October 1987 – At around 06:45 am, Local 225 Rangkas train collided with oncoming 220 Cepat Merak train (head-to-head collision) in Pondok Betung area, Bintaro, Pesanggrahan, South Jakarta. The accident was caused by the mistake of the head of Kebayoran Station who dispatched the Train 220 without informing the head of Sudimara Station that the two trains crossed at Sudimara Station. The incident left 156 people dead and more than 300 injured. This incident is known as the Bintaro Tragedy I.
- 2 November 1993 – At 11:30 am, there was a collision between electric railroad trains in the Ratu Jaya area of Depok city, known as the 1993 Ratu Jaya train accident.
- 24 October 1995 – at 00:10, two combined Kahuripan and Galuh trains crashed in Kadipaten, Tasikmalaya, precisely in the Trowek area (now around Cirahayu Station). This incident caused the train to enter a ravine and two locomotives, CC 201 05 and CC 201 75R were badly damaged and had to undergo major repairs. which also claimed the death and injury victims were on the train that entered the ravine.
- 25 December 2001 – At around 4:33 am, Empu Jaya train with journey number 146 crashed into Gaya Baru Malam Selatan train with journey number 153 which was waiting to cross at track 3 emplacement of Ketanggungan Barat Station, Brebes, Central Java. The collision occurred because train 146 violated the red signal (a sign that the train must stop). This incident resulted in 31 people killed and 53 others seriously injured including the driver of Train 146.
- 2 October 2010 – Petarukan train collision – At 02.45 am, occurred between train 4 Argo Bromo Anggrek and train 116 Senja Utama Semarang, which were waiting for a crossing at Petarukan Station, Pemalang, Central Java. Train 116 Senja Utama Semarang entered track 3 to cross train 101 Senja Kediri and was followed by train 4 Argo Bromo Anggrek. While waiting to be overtaken, KA 116 was suddenly hit from behind by KA 4 which violated the entry signal. The death toll reached 36 and dozens were injured. The crew of Train 4 violated the signal because they were later found to be experiencing microsleep.
- On 9 December 2013 – a Commuter Line train with the TM 7021F series crashed into a Pertamina tanker truck carrying 24,000 liters of premium fuel at the Bintaro railway crossing in South Jakarta. This accident occurred allegedly because the doorstop was not functioning. KRL Commuter Line majoring Serpong-Tanah Abang Station number 1131 departed from Serpong at around 11:01 am, but was slightly late due to air conditioning repairs. After that, it departed for Pondok Ranji. that's where the mistake began to occur. The tanker truck passed through the crossing, not far away the KRL came. The officer immediately raised the red flag. The KRL could not brake suddenly and finally at 11.25 there was a collision. At around 11:30, there were three explosions. This incident is known as the 2013 Bintaro train crash.
- 5 January 2024: Turangga train (KA PLB 65A) on Surabaya Gubeng-Bandung route collided with Commuter Line Bandung Raya (KA 350) on Padalarang-Cicalengka route at km 181+700, Cicalengka-Haurpugur section, Cicalengka, Bandung, West Java; the accident caused 4 deaths, namely the driver and assistant driver of Commuter Line Bandung Raya train, Turangga train attendant, and security unit of Cimekar Station; around 20–31 people were injured. As a result of the incident, train traffic across southern Java in the Bandung-Kutoarjo corridor was disrupted. Further information : 2024 Cicalengka railway collision

== See also ==
- Jakarta Monorail
- Polsuska
- Transport in Indonesia
- List of named passenger trains of Indonesia
- List of railway stations in Indonesia
- List of railway companies in the Dutch East Indies
- List of defunct railways in Indonesia
- List of active railway in Indonesia
- List of Kereta Api Indonesia rolling stock classes
- List of locomotives in Indonesia
- Trams in Surabaya
- Bali MRT
- Indonesian railway rolling stock numbering system and classification
