= 0-4-4-2T =

Locomotive wheel arrangement

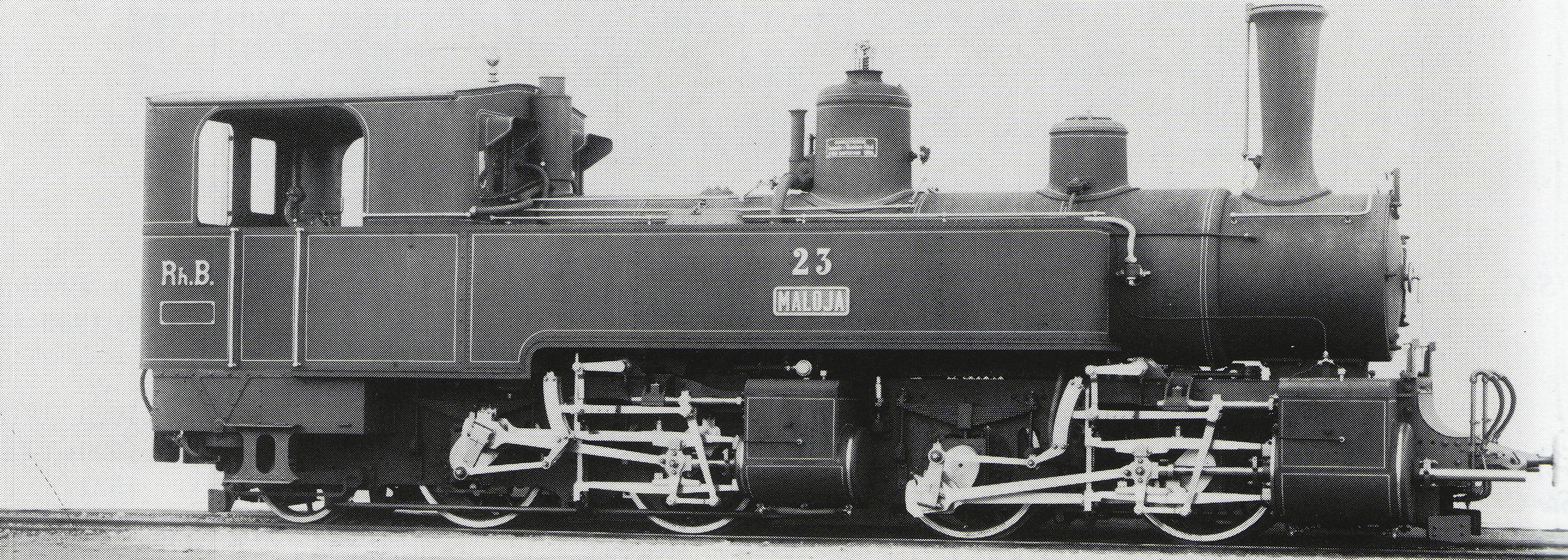
A Swiss narrow gauge G 2/2+2/3 locomotive of the Rhaetian Railway in 1908

In Whyte notation for the classification of steam locomotives by wheel arrangement, an 0-4-4-2T is a locomotive that has no leading wheels, two sets of four driving wheels and two trailing wheels. All known examples were articulated Mallet tank locomotives.

== Equivalent classifications ==
Other equivalent classifications are:

- UIC classification: B′B1′ n4vt (also known as German classification and Italian classification)
- French classification: 020+021
- Turkish classification: 22+23
- Swiss classification: 2/2+2/3

== Examples ==
=== Rhaetian Railway ===
The first Mallet engines of this type were built for the Rhaetian Railway in Switzerland. The steeply-graded metre gauge railway opened initially with conventional 2-6-0T locomotives but soon upgraded to a pair of 0-4-4-0T Mallets. Expansion to Thusis in 1896 needed more locomotives and these were the first two 0-4-4-2T Mallets, with additional water capacity in a well tank at the rear, supported by the trailing truck. The design was not entirely successful and a later batch in 1902 for the extension to reach St. Moritz were built instead as 2-4-4-0T. The earlier locos were then rebuilt to match.

=== Staatsspoorwegen class 500 ===
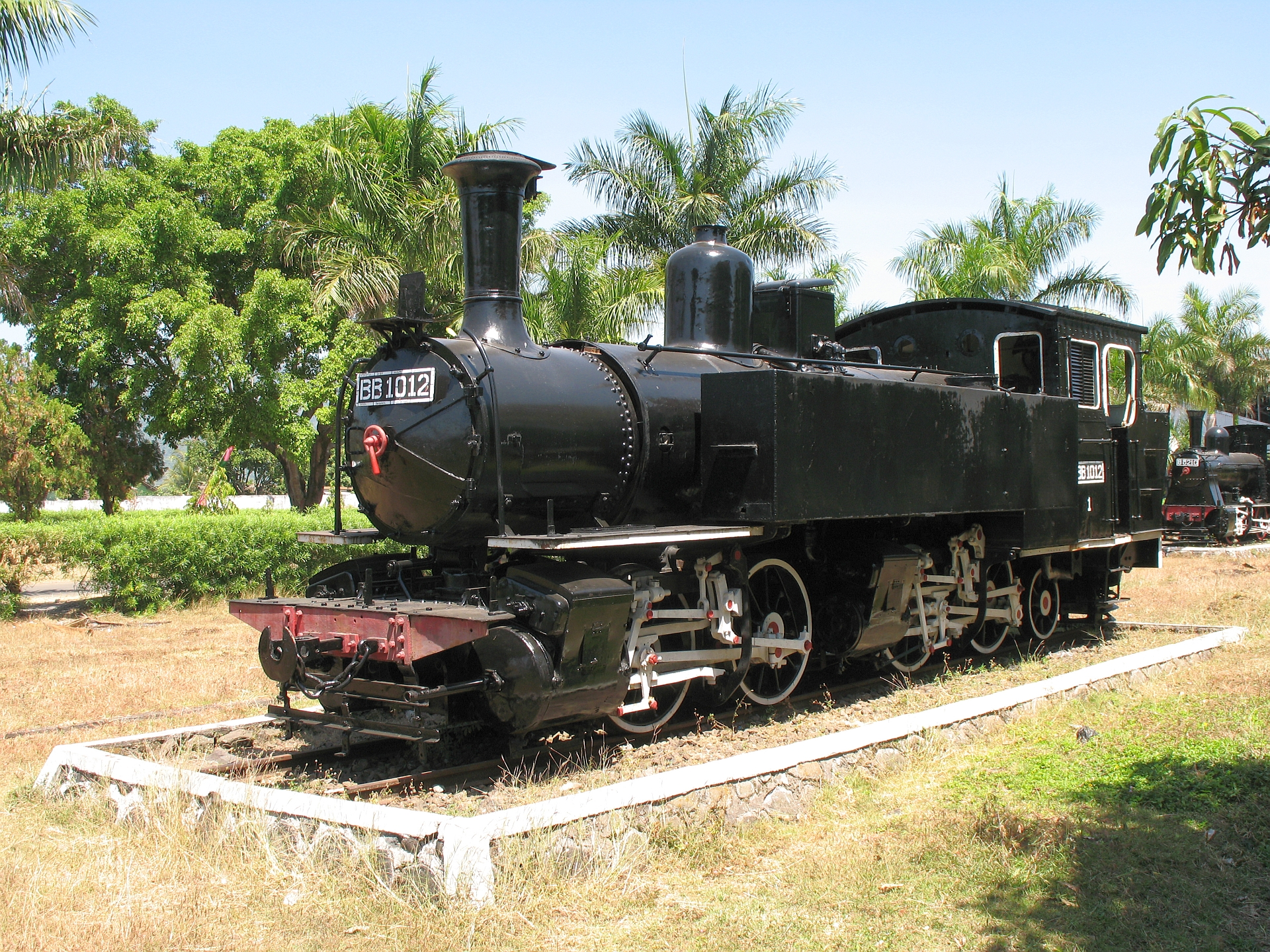
SS 512 or DKA BB10 12 at Ambarawa Railway Museum

0-4-4-2Ts were the first-generation Mallets used by Indonesia since the colonial period in late 19th to early 20th century, when Staatsspoorwegen (the state railway company of the Dutch East Indies) ordered 12 units from Hartmann and 4 from Schwartzkopff in 1899–1908, classified as SS 500 class / later BB10 (501–516) for use on mountain lines in West Java. These locomotives worked mixed trains that transported plantation crops and passengers on the Buitenzorg–Bandung line which opened in 1884. These oil-burned engine had power output of 465 hp (347 kW), which was more powerful and suitable for running the winding mountain terrain with ease compared to older SS locomotives the 2-6-0T (SS Class 300 or DKA C11 and SS Class 400 or DKA C12) which are smaller and slower in size and engine power. The SS 500s were also worked at Rangkasbitung and Banjar. Of the 16 built, only BB10 12 (ex-SS 512) is preserved.

The SS Class 500 was 10.5 m (34 ft 5 in) long with 1,050 mm (3 ft 5 in) diameter wheels and a weight of 44.1 t (48.6 short tons). It had a maximum speed of 50 km/h (31 mph). During Japanese occupation in 1942, these locomotives were renumbered to BB10 and used on Saketi–Bayah railway construction which was used as Japanese war effort for coal transport to the southern coast of West Java as from coal mining in Cikotok. This line was also known as "Death Railway" due to its construction using Japanese PoWs and local residents which were known as romusha or force laborers. One of the BB10 (number 05) was used on Indonesian movie titled "Lebak Membara" (1982) produced by Sabirin Kasdani which tells the story about Indonesian fighters during the Japanese occupation. The last mallets were built for Indonesian Railway (DKA) were 4 units of Type BB1n4v by Nippon Sharyo or known as BB80 class (81–84) came in 1962 for narrow gauge (750 mm) railway line in Aceh. The line itself was built in 1876–1917 by Atjeh Tram which was a part of Staatsspoowegen tram division. The BB80s becoming the only Mallets that were manufactured in Asia. From 4 of them only BB84 is preserved on static display in Banda Aceh.
