= 2-10-10-2 =

Mallet locomotive wheel arrangement

Under the Whyte notation for the classification of steam locomotive wheel arrangements, a 2-10-10-2 is a locomotive with two leading wheels, two sets of ten driving wheels, and a pair of trailing wheels.

Other equivalent classifications are:

UIC classification: 1EE1 (also known as German classification and Swiss classification)
Italian and French classification: 150+051
Turkish classification: 56+56
Swiss classification: 5/6+5/6

The equivalent UIC classification is refined to (1′E)E1′ for Mallet locomotives. All 2-10-10-2 locomotives have been articulated locomotives of the Mallet type.

This wheel arrangement was rare. Only two classes of 2-10-10-2 locomotives have been built: the Atchison, Topeka and Santa Fe Railway's 3000 class, and the Virginian Railway's class AE. The 3000 class performed poorly, so the railroad returned them to their original 2-10-2 configuration after no more than seven years of service. The class AE locomotives were much more successful, providing between 25 and 31 years of service; some were scrapped between 1943 and 1945, and the rest were scrapped between 1947 and 1949. None of either class were preserved.

== ATSF 3000 class ==
ATSF 3000 class
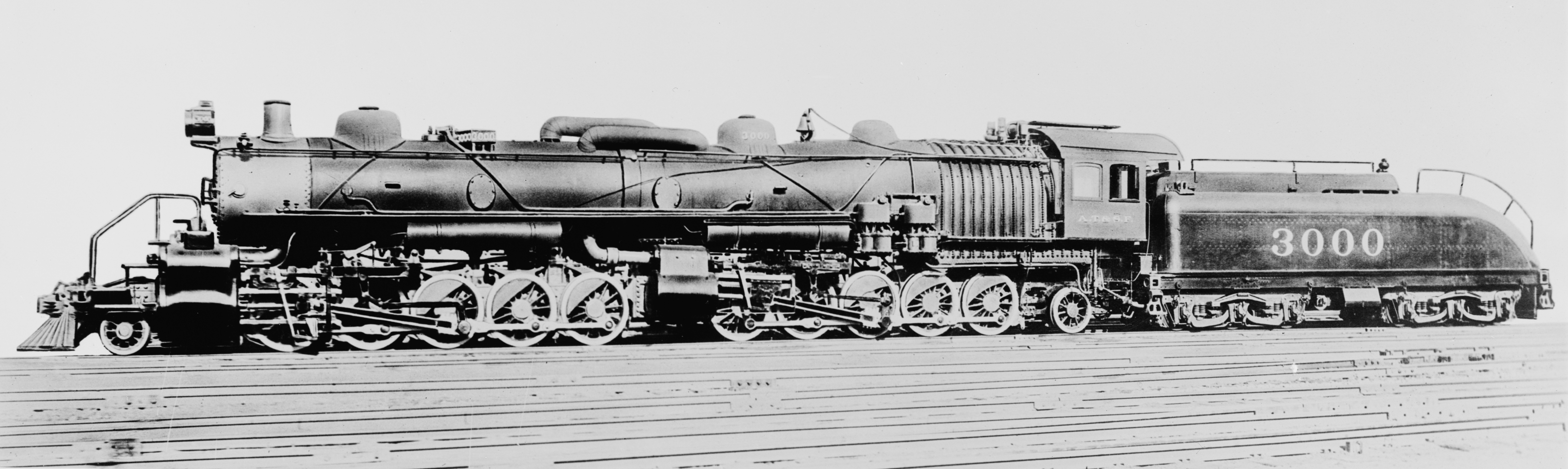
- ATSF 3000 class 2-10-10-2. The forward section of the boiler is a primitive superheater and feedwater heater
Type and origin
- Power type: Steam
- Builder: Baldwin Locomotive Works
- Build date: 1911-1912
- Rebuilder: ATSF
- Rebuild date: 1915-1918 (as 2-10-2’s)
- Number rebuilt: 10
Specifications
- Configuration
  - Whyte: 2-10-10-2
- Gauge: 4 ft 8 1/2 in (1,435 mm)
- Driver dia.: 57 in (1.448 m)
- Wheelbase: 108 ft 10 in (33.17 m)
- Length: 122 ft (37.19 m)
- Loco weight: 616,000 lb (279,400 kg; 279.4 t)
- Tender weight: 266,400 lb (120,800 kg; 120.8 t)
- Total weight: 882,400 lb (400,180 kg; 400.18 t)
- Boiler pressure: 225 psi (1.55 MPa)
- Cylinders: Four, compound (LP front, HP rear)
- High-pressure cylinder: 28 in × 32 in (711 mm × 813 mm)
- Low-pressure cylinder: 38 in × 32 in (965 mm × 813 mm)
Performance figures
- Tractive effort: 111,600 lbf (496 kN)
Career
- Operators: Atchison, Topeka and Santa Fe Railway
- Numbers: 3000–3009
- Withdrawn: 1945-1953
- Scrapped: 1947-1953
- Disposition: All rebuilt into normal 2-10-2s which are scrapped in 1953

In 1911 and 1912, the Atchison, Topeka and Santa Fe Railway modified ten 2-10-2 Baldwin-built locomotives into a new 2-10-10-2 configuration dubbed the 3000 class. They were the largest locomotives in the world from their introduction until 1914. They performed well in helper service, but could only go 10 to 15 mph (16 to 24 km/h) before losing steam. The ATSF reverted them to their 2-10-2 configurations between 1915 and 1918.

== Virginian Railway class AE ==
Virginian Class AE
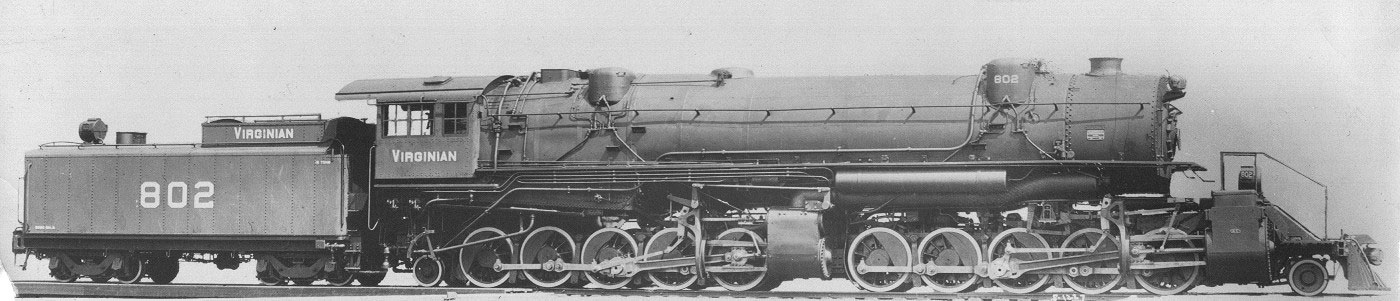
- Virginian Class AE
Type and origin
- Power type: Steam
- Builder: American Locomotive Company
- Order number: 1227
- Build date: 1918
- Total produced: 10
Specifications
- Configuration
  - Whyte: 2-10-10-2
- Gauge: 4 ft 8 1/2 in (1,435 mm)
- Driver dia.: 56 in (1,422 mm)
- Wheelbase: 64.25 ft (19.58 m)
- Width: 12.0 ft (3.658 m)
- Height: 16.625 ft (5.067 m)
- Adhesive weight: 617,000 lb (279,866 kg; 280 t)
- Loco weight: 684,000 lb (310,257 kg; 310 t)
- Tender weight: 214,300 lb (97,205 kg; 97 t)
- Total weight: 898,300 lb (407,462 kg; 407 t)
- Fuel type: Coal
- Water cap.: 13,000 US gal (10,825 imp gal; 49,210 L)
- Tender cap.: 12 short tons (10.7 long tons; 10.9 t)
- Firebox
  - Grate area: 108.7 sq ft (10 m^{2})
- Boiler: 118.5 in (3,010 mm)
- Boiler pressure: 215 psi (1 MPa)
- Heating surface
  - Tubes: 5,580 sq ft (518 m^{2})
  - Arch tubes: 438 sq ft (41 m^{2})
  - Flues: 2,510 sq ft (233 m^{2})
  - Total surface: 8,528 sq ft (792 m^{2})
- Superheater
  - Heating area: 2,120 sq ft (197 m^{2})
- Cylinders: Four, compound (LP front, HP rear)
- High-pressure cylinder: 30 in × 32 in (762 mm × 813 mm)
- Low-pressure cylinder: 48 in × 32 in (1,219 mm × 813 mm)
- Valve gear: Walschaerts
- Loco brake: Air
- Train brakes: Air
Performance figures
- Tractive effort: Compound: 147,200 lbf (655 kN); Simple: 176,600 lbf (786 kN)
- Factor of adh.: 4.19
Career
- Operators: Virginian
- Number in class: 10
- Numbers: 800-809
- Disposition: All scrapped from 1943-1953

These ten locomotives were built in 1918 by ALCO for the Virginian Railway. With a width of 12 feet (3,658 mm), they were delivered without their cabs and front low-pressure cylinders and were assembled after delivery. The 48-inch (1,219 mm) low-pressure cylinders (on 90-inch or 2,286-millimetre centers) were the largest on any U.S. locomotive; these had to be inclined a few degrees to provide clearance. The boiler was also the widest of any locomotive; Railway Mechanical Engineer says "the outside diameter of the largest course is 112 7/8 inches (2,867 mm)." but the drawing shows 118 1/2 inches (3,010 mm) diameter at the rear tube sheet. Their accompanying fuel tenders were shorter than usual so the locomotive would fit on the Virginian's turntables.

This class were compound Mallet locomotives. The rear, high-pressure cylinders exhausted their steam into the huge front cylinders. They could also be operated in simple mode for starting; reduced-pressure steam could be sent straight from the boiler to the front cylinders at low speed, for maximum tractive effort.

The calculated tractive effort was 147,200 lb (66,800 kg) in compound, or 176,600 lb (80,100 kg) in simple for the Virginian locomotives.

The class remained in service until the 1940s. No examples have been preserved.
