= 2-4-4-0 =

Steam locomotive wheel arrangement

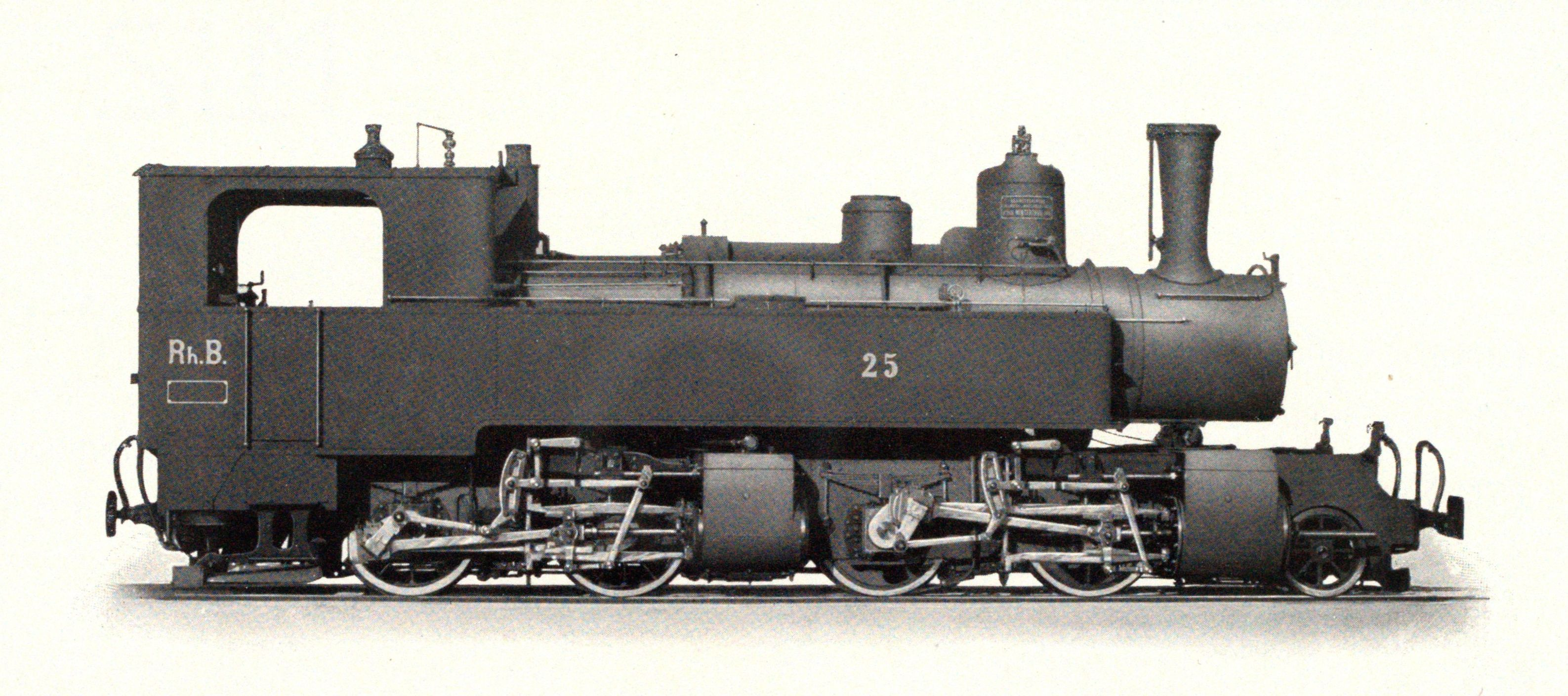
A Swiss narrow gauge G 2/3+2/2 locomotive of the Rhaetian Railway in 1902

In the Whyte notation for the classification of steam locomotive wheel arrangement, a 2-4-4-0 is a locomotive with two leading wheels, two sets of four driving wheels, and no trailing wheels. Examples of this type were constructed as Mallet locomotives.

== Examples ==
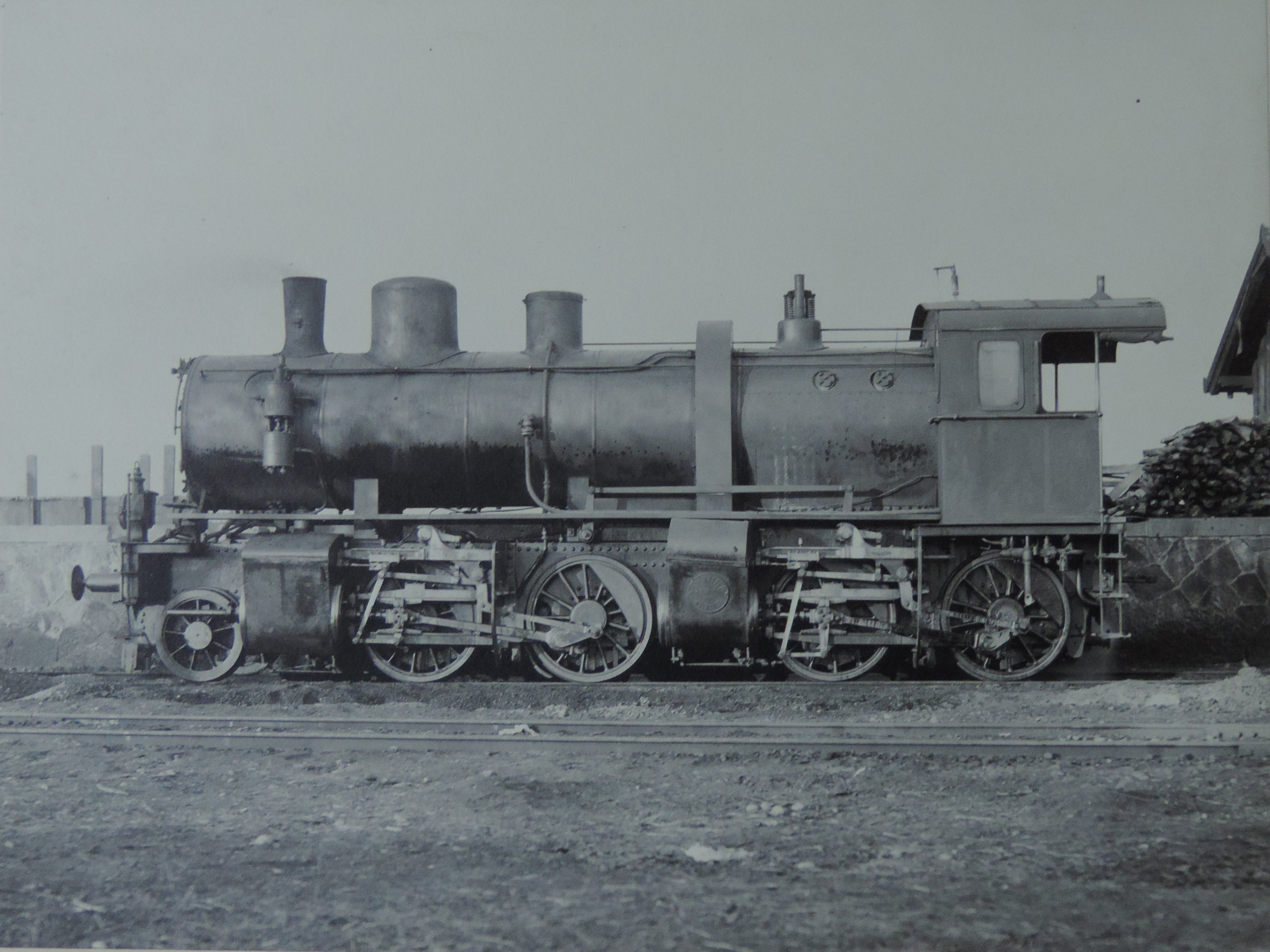
Bulgarian State Railways class 29.01

Bulgaria had one example of its class 29.01, built as No. 68 in 1908 and nicknamed "Баба Клементина“ (Grandma Clementina). It was unsuccessful, though it was kept on until 1950 in storage. It is unique for being one of Bulgaria's only mallet locomotives, and the only one with eight driving wheels.

The Chemins de Fer Departmentaux Vivarais and the Chemins de Fer Departmentaux Lozère each possessed 2-4-4-0 Mallet locomotives. The Société Alsacienne de Constructions Mécaniques built three for the Vivarais system in 1908 and two for the Lozère system in 1909.

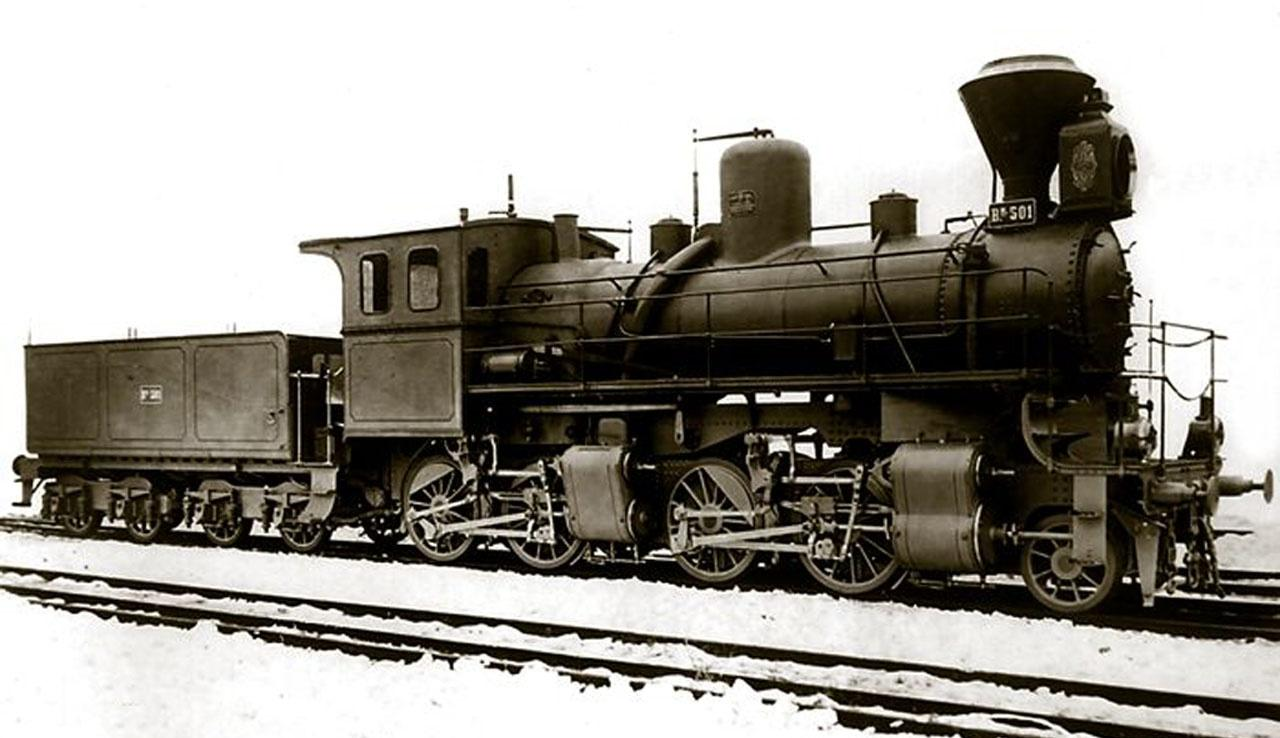
Russian "Class І"

Russian "Class І" (de:Russische Baureihe І, German Wikipedia) were rare examples of Mallets designed for passenger service. More than 100 were built between 1903 and 1909, and the last were in use until the 1950s.

== Equivalent classifications ==
Other equivalent classifications are:

- UIC classification: 1BB (also known as German classification and Italian classification)
- French classification: 120+020
- Turkish classification: 23+22
- Swiss classification: 2/3+2/2
- Russian classification: 1-2-0+0-2-0

The UIC classification is 1B'B.
