= Landquart-Davos G 2x2/2 =

Swiss narrow-gauge steam locomotive class

Landquart–Davos G 2x2/2 Rhaetian Railway G 2x2/2 / G 2/3+2/2
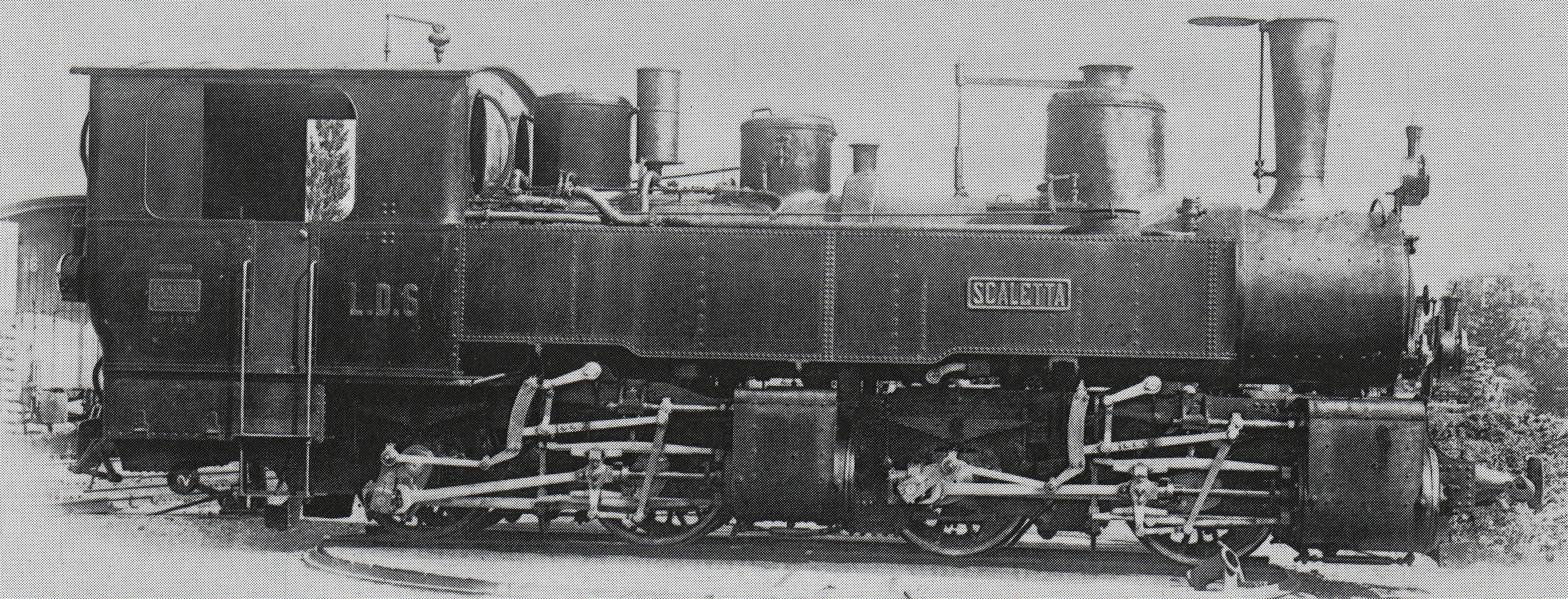
- Nr. 6 Scaletta, as delivered, before 1895
Type and origin
- Power type: Steam
- Builder: J. A. Maffei
- Serial number: 1613–1614
- Build date: 1891
- Total produced: 2
Specifications
- Configuration
  - Whyte: Originally: 0-4-4-0T Mallet; 1st rebuild: 2-4-4-0T Mallet; 2nd rebuild: 2-4-4-0 Mallet
  - UIC: Originally: B′B n4vt Rebuilt: (1′B)B n4vt
- Gauge: 1,000 mm (3 ft 3 3/8 in)
- Driver dia.: 1,050 mm (41.34 in)
- Wheelbase: 1,600 mm (5 ft 3 in)
- Length: Originally: 10,250 mm (33 ft 8 in); Rebuilt: 10,644 mm (34 ft 11 in)
- Axle load: 10.125 tonnes (22,300 lb)
- Adhesive weight: Originally: 40.5 tonnes (89,300 lb); Rebuilt: 42.3 tonnes (93,300 lb)
- Loco weight: Original empty: 36.5 tonnes (80,500 lb); Original service: 44.5 tonnes (98,100 lb); Rebuilt empty: 39.4 tonnes (86,900 lb); Rebuilt service: 47.3 tonnes (104,300 lb)
- Fuel type: Coal
- Fuel capacity: Originally: 1.2 tonnes (2,650 lb); Rebuilt: 1.0 tonne (2,200 lb)
- Water cap.: Originally: 3,000 L (660 imp gal; 790 US gal); Rebuilt: 3,400 L (750 imp gal; 900 US gal)
- Firebox
  - Grate area: 1.4 m^{2} (15 sq ft)
- Boiler pressure: 12 atm (1.22 MPa; 176 psi)
- Heating surface: 80.2 m^{2} (863 sq ft)
- Cylinders: Four: Two HP (rear); two LP (front)
- High-pressure cylinder: 330 mm × 550 mm (12.99 in × 21.65 in)
- Low-pressure cylinder: 490 mm × 550 mm (19.29 in × 21.65 in)
- Valve gear: Walschaerts
Career
- Operators: Landquart-Davos Railway (1891–1895); Rhaetian Railway (1895–1920); Rede Sul Mineira de Viação (1920–1939)
- Class: G 2x2/2 G 2/3+2/2
- Number in class: 2
- Numbers: LD: RhB: 21, 22; RSMV: 241–242
- Locale: Graubünden, Switzerland; Minas Gerais, Brazil
- First run: 1891 (Switzerland); 1920 (Brazil)
- Retired: 1920 (Switzerland) ca 1940 (Brazil)
- Scrapped: by 1944

The Landquart-Davos G 2x2/2, also known as the Rhaetian Railway G 2x2/2, and, from 1910 to 1911, as the Rhaetian Railway G 2/3+2/2, was a two-member class of metre gauge Mallet-type steam locomotives manufactured by J. A. Maffei in Munich, Germany.

Both locomotives in the class entered service in Switzerland in 1891. They were rebuilt in 1910–1911, but became surplus to requirements in 1920. They were then sold and sent to Brazil, where they continued to operate until about 1940.

The two members of the class were so named under the Swiss locomotive and railcar classification system. According to that system:

- G 2x2/2 denotes a narrow gauge steam locomotive with two trucks, each fitted with two drive axles;
- G 2/3+2/2 denotes a two bogie narrow gauge steam locomotive, with the front bogie having three axles, two of them drive axles, and the other bogie being fitted with just two drive axles.

== Service history ==
=== Switzerland ===
The G 2x2/2 class was commissioned by the Landquart-Davos Railway (LD), in the Canton of Graubünden, Switzerland. Each of the two locomotives cost 68,400 Swiss francs, and joined the LD fleet in 1891. They were numbered 21 and 22, respectively.

In 1895, the LD changed its name to the Rhaetian Railway (RhB), which continued to operate the class. In 1910–1911, both of the locomotives were rebuilt to coincide with a boiler exchange. As part of the rebuilding, they were fitted with a leading pony truck, and were thus modified to resemble the final member of the Rhaetian Railway G 2/3+2/2 class.

In light of this modification, the two rebuilt locomotives were themselves reclassified as part of the G 2/3+2/2 class.

Soon after the rebuilding of these locomotives, coal shortages during World War I called into question the further use of steam locomotives in Switzerland. The Rhaetian Railway therefore decided to electrify all of its lines on the model of the Engadine Railway, opened in 1914. The electrification project was able to be completed in 1919.

In 1920, the two now surplus rebuilt locomotives were withdrawn from Rhaetian Railway service and sold to Companhia de Mineração Santa Matilde, a Brazilian mineral prospecting company.

=== Brazil ===
In the same year, 1920, Santa Matilde sold both locomotives to the railway company Rede Sul Mineira de Viação (SM), located in the south of the Brazilian federal state of Minas Gerais, where they were reclassified as type 2-4-4-0T, and given operating numbers 241 (serial no 1613) and 242 (serial no 1614), respectively.

In 1937–1938, locomotive 242 (serial no 1614) was rebuilt as a 2-4-4-0 tender locomotive at the SM workshop in Divinópolis, MG. At the completion of this rebuild, the locomotive's operating number was changed to 330.

During 1938/1939, the SM was merged with the Estrada de Ferro Oeste de Minas (OM) and various smaller railway companies in Minas Gerais to form the Rede Mineira de Viação (RMV). In 1939, all affected locomotives were renumbered. Locomotive no 330 (ex-SM 242, serial no 1614) received a new RMV holding number 156. However, as early as 1941 the RMW placed that locomotive out of service.

Meanwhile, in 1938, the SM had undertaken the same rebuilding work in Divinópolis to locomotive 241 (serial number 1613), and had renumbered it 331. It is possible that this latter rebuild was never completed; in the RMV annual report for 1940, locomotive 331 (ex 241) was recorded as being out of service.

Another indication that the work on locomotive 331 (ex 241) was never completed is the fact that it appears never to have been given a new RMV operating number. It is not even clear which of the two possible new numbers 155 and 157 would have been allocated to that locomotive.

By 1944, neither locomotive was still appearing in the RMV locomotive lists. Presumably, they both suffered the fate of most steam locomotives in Brazil in the 1940s and 1950s: demolition.
