= Atjeh Tram =

Railroad line in Sumatra, Indonesia

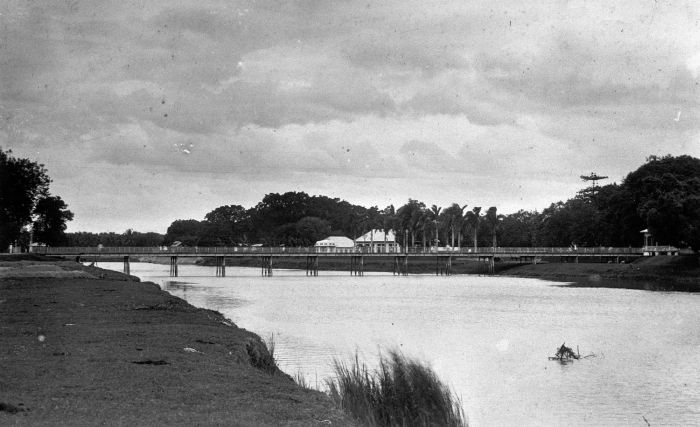
Atjeh Tram, crossing the Aceh River, 1922–1926.

The Atjeh Tram was a railroad line in Aceh, on the island of Sumatra. It was built from 1874 by the Military engineering section of the Royal Netherlands East Indies Army (abbreviated KNIL in Dutch). Originally a loop for the port of Oleh Leh, it was rebuilt as a route for the transport of military goods stretching from Ule Lheu to the port of Pangkalan Susu in the Sultanate of Langkat. The line was 511 kilometers (318 mi) long, with 120 stops and stations along the way. It was finished in 1917. During the Aceh War the railroad proved of great importance for the quick transportation of troops and material.

The line was also used for civilian transportation; by 1920 it moved over 4 million people and over 153,000 tonnes (151,000 long tons; 169,000 short tons) of goods.

Parts of it were used even after World War II, but due also to the Acehnese rebellion the line as a whole became derelict. A study done in 2005 by the SNCF suggested that the line could be repaired, but the narrow-gauge railway (750 mm / 2 ft 5 1/2 in) would have to be widened to 1,435 mm (4 ft 8 1/2 in) standard gauge.

== Construction ==
The Acehnese capital, Koeta-Radja, was separated from the coast by swamps and mudflats. Dutch troops during the First and Second Aceh Expeditions lost artillery pieces crossing this strip of land on the way to besiege the capital. Governor General Loudon announced a plan on 26 June 1874 to build a narrow-gauge railroad between Koeta Radja and Oleh Leh on the coast. A jetty was to be constructed at Oleh Leh. This line had a total length of 5 km (3.1 mi) and was known as the Atjeh Military Tramway.

The gauge chosen for the track was 1,067 mm (3 ft 6 in). Iron scaffolding was imported from Singapore and wood for the sleepers from Malacca. The locomotives and rolling stock were ordered from Britain through the Dutch Consul-General in Singapore. These arrived on 5 May 1875; however shortage of labor meant that the line was not completed until September 1876.

In 1884 the Military authorities decided to change the gauge from 1,067 mm (3 ft 6 in) to 750 mm (2 ft 5 1/2 in), which was the gauge selected to be used for the "public" Atjeh Tramway from Koeta Radja to Pangkalan Susu. The 3 locomotives, 2 from Fox Walker and one from Hohenzollern, were no longer suitable and were transferred to Staatsspoorwegen in 1884.

== Locomotives ==
Three 0-6-0T locomotives were ordered in 1874 via the Dutch consulate in Singapore, 2 from Fox Walker and one from Hohenzollern. They were delivered, along with the rest of the materials for the railway, in May 1875.

A class of twelve 2-4-0T locomotives were constructed for the line by Hanomag from 1887 to 1899. A further two were built in 1904 by the Kutaraja and the Sigli engineering shops of the tramway.

A class of forty-two 0-6-0T locomotives were built by Hanomag and Werkspoor between 1898 and 1904. Two 4-6-0 tender locomotives were supplied by Werkspoor in 1922. Six 2-8-0 tender locomotives were supplied by Hanomag in 1930 and a further six by Du Croo & Brauns in 1931. Mallet locomotives of 0-4-4-2T configuration operated over the steep gradients; six were supplied by Maschinenfabrik Esslingen in 1904, and a further four by Nippon Sharyo in 1962. The latter firm also supplied six 2-6-0 tender locomotives in the same year.

== From 1882 to 1896 ==
On 1 January 1882 a civil administration was introduced in Aceh. The operation of the line was transferred to the Burgerlijke Openbare Werken (BOW), part of the government's civil service.

== See also ==
- Railway companies in the Dutch East Indies
