= Rhaetian Railway G 2/3+2/2 =

Swiss narrow-gauge steam locomotive class

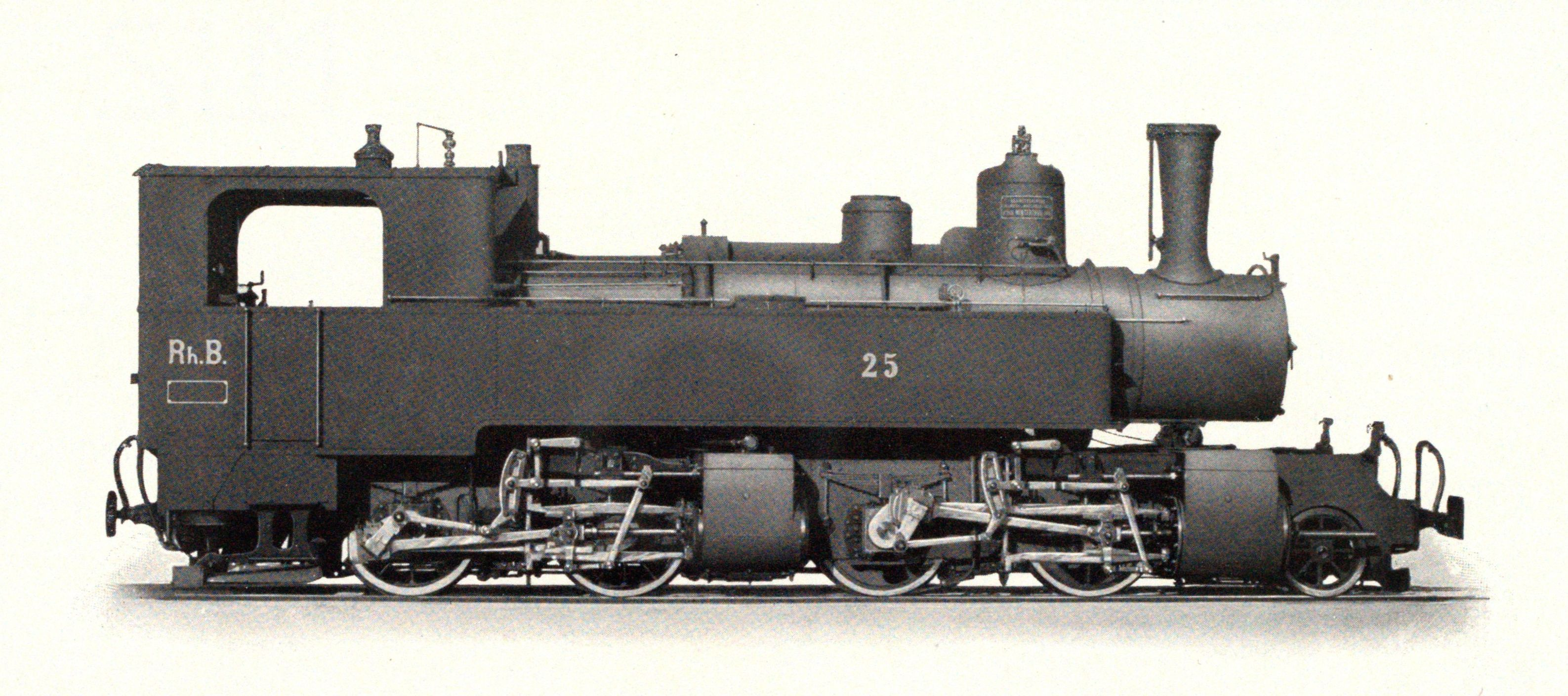
Type and origin
- Power type: Steam
- Builder: Swiss Locomotive and Machine Works
- Build date: 1902
- Total produced: 8
Specifications
- Configuration
  - Whyte: 2-4-4-0T Mallet
  - UIC: (1′B)B n4vt
- Gauge: 1,000 mm (3 ft 3 3/8 in)
- Driver dia.: 1,050 mm (41.34 in)
- Wheelbase: 7,100 mm (23 ft 4 in)
- Length: 10,626 mm (34 ft 10 in)
- Axle load: 10.69 tonnes (23,600 lb)
- Adhesive weight: 42.8 tonnes (94,400 lb)
- Loco weight: Empty: 39.7 tonnes (87,500 lb); Service: 47.3 tonnes (104,300 lb)
- Fuel type: Coal
- Fuel capacity: 1 tonne (2,200 lb)
- Water cap.: 3,400 L (750 imp gal; 900 US gal)
- Firebox
  - Grate area: 1.3 m^{2} (14 sq ft)
- Boiler pressure: 14 atm (1.42 MPa; 206 psi)
- Heating surface: 79 sq ft (7.3 m^{2})
- Cylinders: Four: Two HP (rear), two LP (front)
- High-pressure cylinder: 330 mm × 550 mm (12.99 in × 21.65 in)
- Low-pressure cylinder: 490 mm × 550 mm (19.29 in × 21.65 in)
- Valve gear: Walschaerts
Career
- Operators: Rhaetian Railway
- Class: G 2/3+2/2
- Numbers: RhB: 25–32
- Locale: Graubünden, Switzerland
- Retired: 1920–1921 (sold)
- Scrapped: by 1964

The Rhaetian Railway G 2/3+2/2 was an eight member class of metre gauge Mallet-type steam locomotives manufactured by SLM in Winterthur, Switzerland in 1902, and operated until 1920–1921 by the Rhaetian Railway, in the Canton of Graubünden, Switzerland.

The class was so named under the Swiss locomotive and railcar classification system. According to that system, G 2/3+2/2 denotes a two bogie narrow gauge steam locomotive, with the front bogie being fitted with three axles, two of them drive axles, and the rear bogie having only two axles, both of them drive axles.

The G 2/3+2/2 class was the successor series to the two member G 2/2+2/3 class, which had its only non-drive axle in a rear bogie, thus providing an extra set of wheels under the driver's cab. In the successor G 2/3+2/2 class, the order of the chassis and its wheel arrangement was reversed. The single non-drive axle was therefore mounted right at the front of the locomotive.

There were minor differences between locomotive number 31 and the other locomotives in the G 2/3+2/2 class.

== Technical details ==
All members of the G 2/3+2/2 class had an external frame. The part of the chassis supporting the rear of the locomotive was pulled forward, and in the centre supported the bogie. The boiler was mounted forward of this point, and thus its rear was supported at fulcrum level. The locomotive had no pivot point, as a ball joint provided for steam injection.

The bogie was connected with the chassis by pivot bearings, creating an articulated joint. In connection with this, there were two buffer springs, which, together with the centring springs of the mobile crosshead guides, counteracted any rolling of the bogie. The carrying axle was in the form of an Adams axle, and therefore had greater articulation than the bogie.

The main rationale for locating the earlier G 2/2+2/3 class's sole carrying axle in a position under the locomotive's cab had been that it increased the locomotive's operating reserves. However, it quickly became apparent that these changes had not improved the locomotive's ride quality, and that the G 2/2+2/3 class caused similarly high flange and track wear as their predecessors, the G 2x2/2 class. That was the basis on which the G 2/3+2/2 class was later built with a leading carrying axle instead of a trailing one.

The rear cylinders of the G 2/3+2/2 class were the high-pressure cylinders, which drew all of their steam directly from the centrally located steam dome. The front cylinders were fed with the exhaust steam of the high-pressure cylinders. Steam was supplied to the cylinders by fixed pipes, the ball joint of which was located in the pivot. The exhaust steam was led to the blast pipe via an articulated exhaust pipe fitted with stuffing boxes. To start the locomotive, the low-pressure cylinders could be supplied with low-pressure steam.

The two sets of valve gear were of identical Walschaerts design. Each set of valve gear was controlled by two overhead camshafts coupled and balanced with an inside rod. Reversing was achieved with a screw and wheel. With a fully open regulator, live steam was supplied to the low-pressure cylinders by an automatic throttle.

== Disposal ==
All locomotives in the G 2/3+2/2 class were sold after the electrification of the Rhaetian Railway in 1920 and 1921.

Numbers 25 and 29 to 32 were sent to Madagascar, where they were withdrawn from service in 1951 and scrapped.

Numbers 26 to 28 were sold initially to Chemin de fer Yverdon–Ste-Croix (YStC). Prior to delivery to their new owners, they were fitted with a Schmitt-type superheater at the Rhaetian Railway's Landquart workshop. After serving on the (YStC0, they were sold again, this time to Union Espanola de Explosivos in Spain. These machines were decommissioned and scrapped between 1946 and 1964.
