= Mallet locomotive =

Articulated locomotive with compound steam power

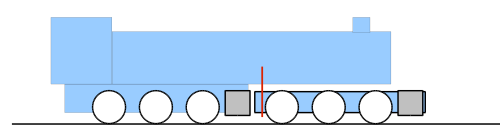
Diagram of Mallet articulation (red line) system

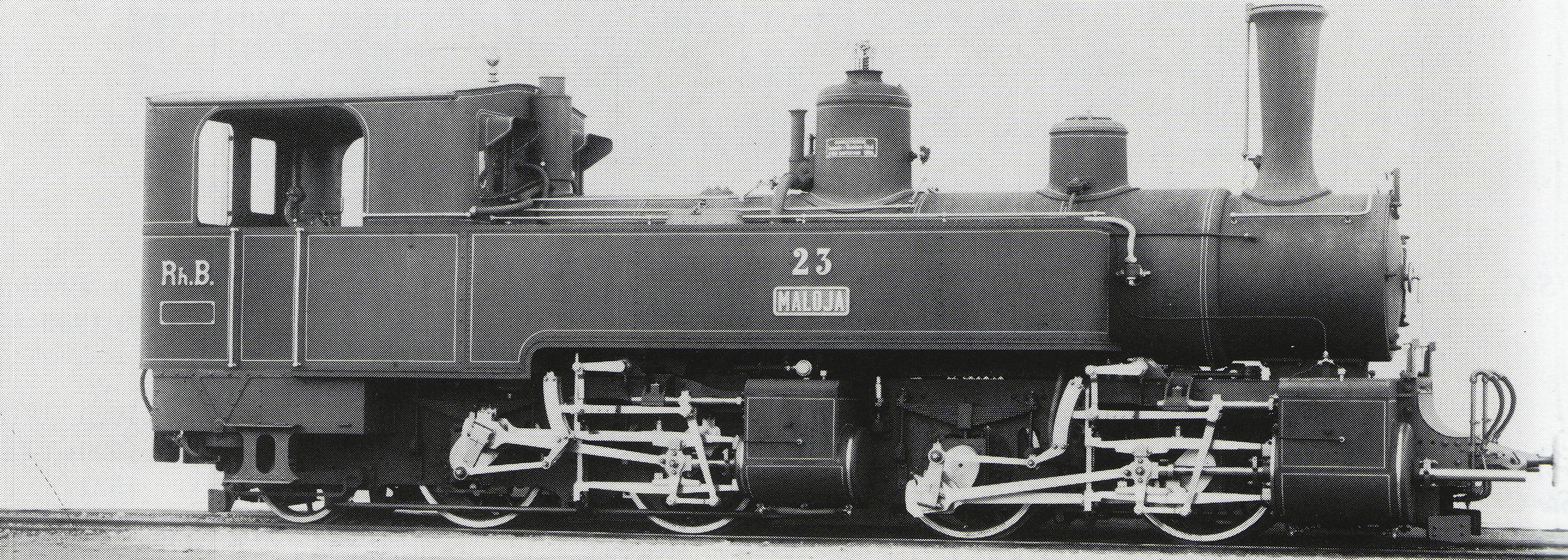
A typical European Mallet type, a narrow-gauge 0-4-4-2T tank locomotive for a mountain railway, the RhB G 2/2+2/3 in Switzerland

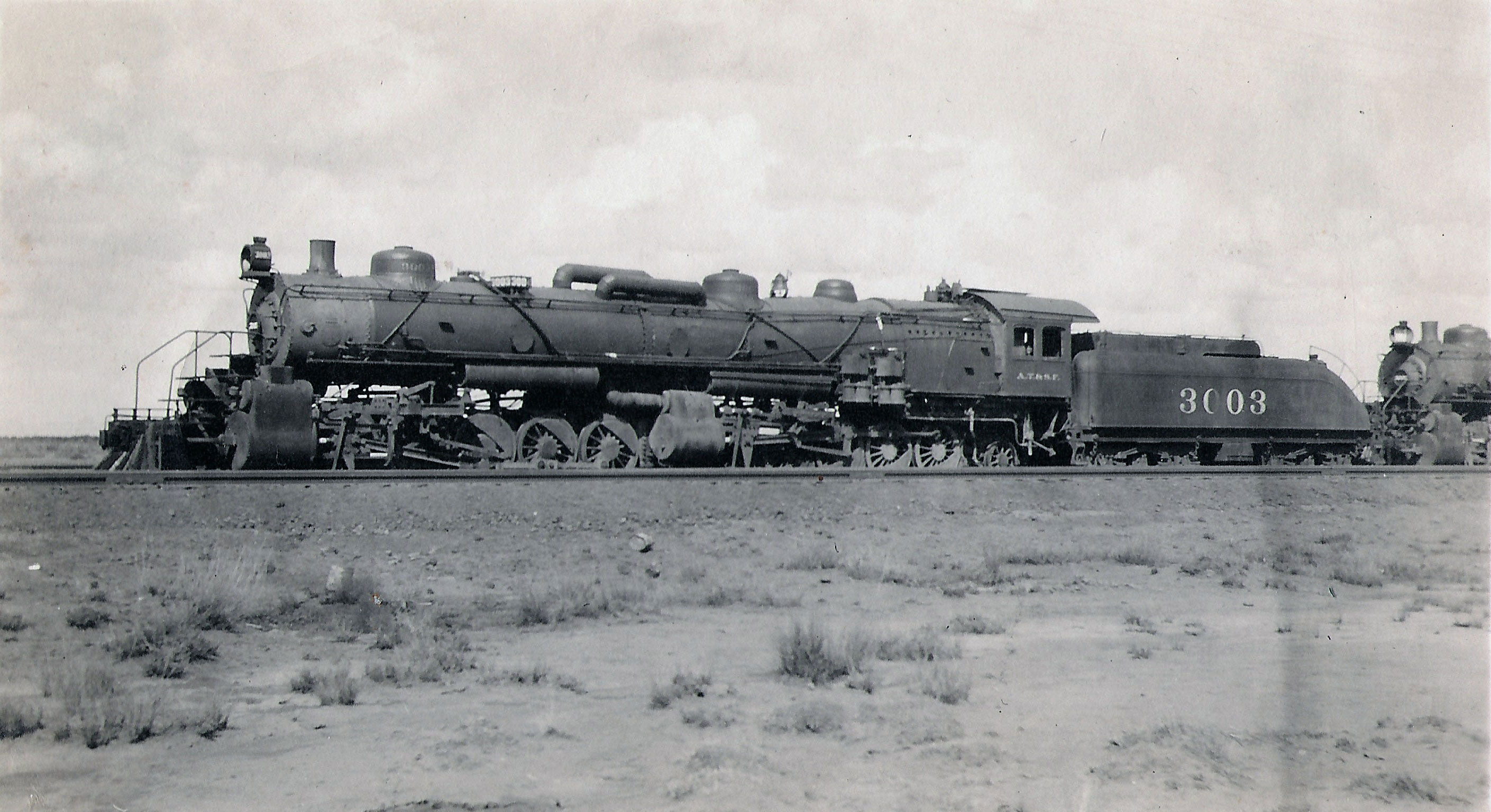
A 2-10-10-2 Mallet locomotive in Winslow, Arizona, in 1913–1914 owned by the Atchison, Topeka and Santa Fe Railway

A Mallet locomotive is a type of compound articulated steam locomotive, invented by the Swiss engineer Anatole Mallet (1837–1919).

The front of the locomotive is articulated on a bogie. The compound steam system fed steam at boiler pressure to high-pressure cylinders driving the rear set of driving wheels (rigidly connected to the boiler). The exhaust steam from these cylinders was fed into a low-pressure receiver and was then sent to low-pressure cylinders that powered the driving wheels on the swiveling bogie towards the front of locomotive.

== Compounding ==
Steam under pressure is converted into mechanical energy more efficiently if it is used in a compound engine; in such an engine, steam from a boiler is used in high-pressure (HP) cylinders and then under reduced pressure in a second set of cylinders. The lower-pressure steam occupies a larger volume and the low-pressure (LP) cylinders are larger than the high-pressure cylinders.

A third stage (triple expansion) may be employed. Compounding was proposed by the British engineer Jonathan Hornblower in 1781.

The American engineer W. S. Hudson patented a system of compounding for railway locomotives in 1873 in which he proposed an intermediate receiver surrounded by hot gas from the fire, so that the low-pressure steam is partly superheated.

Mallet proposed cross-compounding in which a conventional steam locomotive configuration would have one high-pressure cylinder and one low-pressure cylinder. He patented the system in 1874, and in 1876 the first locomotive to the patent was built, an 0-4-2T for the Bayonne and Biarritz Railway. Several others followed for railways in mainland Europe.

The London and North Western Railway locomotive engineer F W Webb adopted the idea and converted some existing locomotives in 1879, followed by de Glehn and others in the 1880s and several American engineers in the 1890s which included some vertical boiler railcar applications.

== Articulation ==
Mallet found typical main line railways were unwilling to adopt his ideas. In 1884, he proposed compounding combined with articulation; on lightly engineered secondary lines this could give greater power to locomotives whose axle load and size were limited. His patent 162876 in France specified four cylinders, two large and two small, with one pair of cylinders acting on two or three fixed axles, and the other pair acting on axles mounted in a swivelling truck.

The weight of the front part of the boiler was to be supported on an arc-shaped radial bearing. The truck could therefore turn into a curve and move to some extent laterally. Typically the support bearing was placed beneath the smokebox, hollowed and with a sliding seal to provide a route for exhaust steam from the low-pressure cylinders to discharge through a blastpipe within the smoke box.

Mallet considered that the major advantage of this arrangement was that it enabled the cylinders on the truck to be fed with low-pressure steam: the high-pressure cylinders were on the fixed main frame and only low-pressure steam needed to be carried through movable pipes to the swivelling truck.

== The Mallet concept ==
This came to be understood as a "Mallet" locomotive: an articulated locomotive in which the rear set of driving wheels were fixed in the main frame of the locomotive; an articulated truck carrying a second set of driving wheels; and compounding in which the high-pressure cylinders drove the axles on the main frame and the articulated axles were driven by low-pressure steam.

Mallet asserted that the advantages of his concept were:

- all the locomotive weight would be adhesive, yet there would be great flexibility of the locomotive as a vehicle;
- the difficulties with Meyer, Fairlie and other then-existing articulated systems would be eliminated as the moving pipes would be carrying low-pressure steam at only 40 to 55 psi (280 to 380 kPa) pressure, and would be easier to keep steam-tight; and
- A simple type of very powerful locomotive would be created.

The large-diameter pipe conveying the low-pressure steam from the high-pressure to the low-pressure cylinders acted also as a receiver, forming a buffer for the gas flow.

Independent cut-offs for the high-pressure and low-pressure cylinders were advocated by Mallet, but driving standards were inadequate and he later used combined cut-off control.

== European versions ==
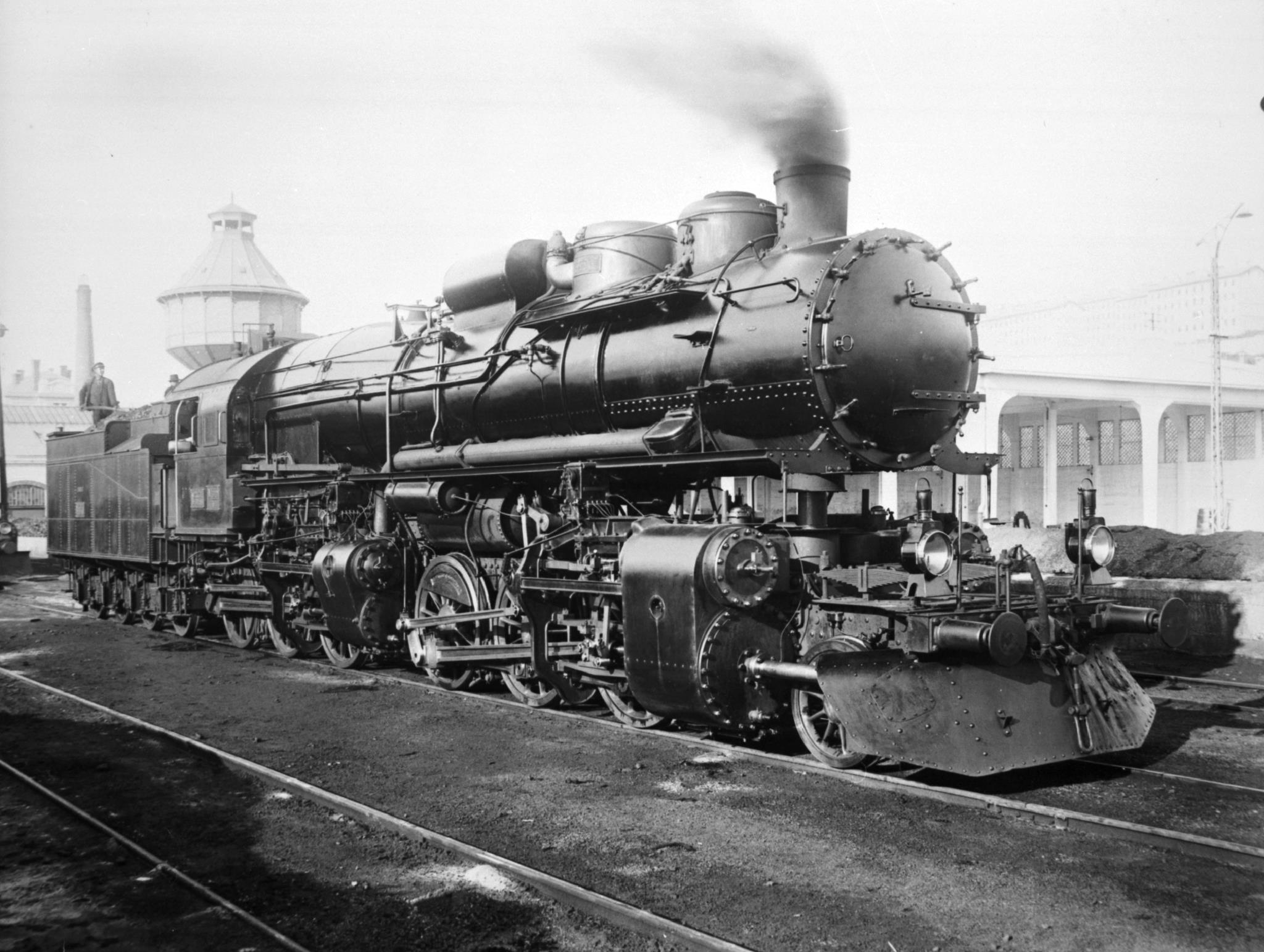
MÁV Class 601 in 1914

Large numbers of Mallet designs for narrow-gauge railways were built, but in 1889 the first six standard gauge examples were built by J A Maffei for the Swiss Central railways, and an 87 t (96 short tons) 0-6-6-0T banker (US: pusher) for the Gotthard Bahn, the last being the most powerful and heaviest locomotive in the world at the time. By 1892 110 Mallets were at work, of which 24 were standard gauge; by 1900 there were nearly 400, of which 218 were on standard gauge or Russian gauge (1,520 mm (4 ft 11 27/32 in)).

One of the examples in Germany was the class of 0-8-8-0Ts built by Maffei for Bavarian State Railways between 1913 and 1923. Mallet designs were popular in Hungary as well; 30 of MÁV 422 0-4-4-0 were built between 1898 and 1902 (the last one served until 1958). MÁV 401 was a (1B)B locomotive in service between 1905–1969 and MÁV 651 0-6-6-0 until 1962. The strongest Mallet locomotives in Europe were the members of the MÁV 601 which were built for the Hungarian State Railways, a 2-6-6-0 locomotive. With their 22.5 m (73 ft 10 in) length, 163.3 t (180.0 short tons) weight and 2,200 kW (3,000 hp) power output, the MÁV 601 was the longest, heaviest and most powerful steam locomotive built before and during World War I in Europe.

== North American versions ==
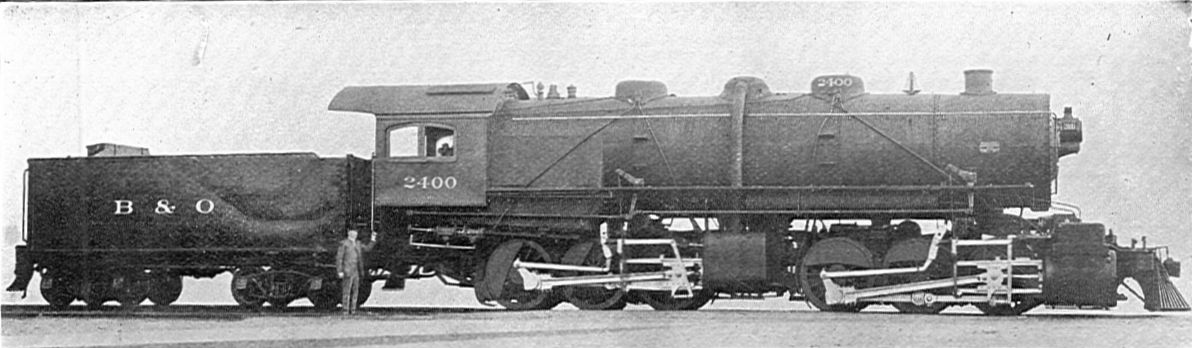
Baltimore and Ohio Railroad No. 2400, the first American Mallet

The first Mallet locomotive in the United States was Baltimore and Ohio Railroad number 2400, built by Alco in 1904. Nicknamed "Old Maude", it was an 0-6-6-0 weighing 334,500 lb (151,700 kg) and with axle loads of 60,000 lb (27,000 kg). Received negatively at first due to speed limitation arising from the short wheelbase and stiff suspension, it gained support during service, and it was soon followed by Baldwin examples, and then steadily heavier and more powerful successors.

In Canada, the Canadian Pacific Railway experimented with an unusual design of Mallet promoted by H.H. Vaughan, then Chief Mechanical Officer and Assistant to the CPR Vice-president. Their in-house compound 0-6-6-0 design located both the high and low pressure cylinders adjacent to one another in the center of the locomotive driving opposite directions. Produced in the CPR's Angus shops, road numbers 1950 to 1954 were outshopped between 1909 and 1911. An additional "simple" (as opposed to compound) unit with road #1955 featuring the same arrangement was also produced. These were used in helper service in the Rockies and Selkirks. The units were unpopular with crews owing to frequent steam leakages and derailments resulting from the lack of pilot wheels. While not an outright failure these were considered an unsuccessful design, and by 1916-1917 these units had been converted to a conventional 2-10-0 arrangement. These six locomotives were ultimately the only articulated locomotives operated by a Canadian railway.

As weight and power and length increased, there were experiments with flexible boiler casings; from 1910 the Santa Fe road introduced jointed-boiler 2-6-6-2 locomotives weighing 392,000 lb (178,000 kg), with a 37 feet (11.28 m) long boiler barrel, with a firetube reheater and a firetube feedwater section in front, each separated by a blank section, and variants of a telescopic or bellows type boiler casing. These were unsuccessful, and later engines used conventional boilers.

The largest compound Mallets were ten 2-10-10-2s built for the Virginian by Alco in 1918; in pairs they pushed coal trains headed by a 2-8-8-2. The AT&SF also had a number of compound 2-10-10-2s, assembled in their own shops from existing 2-10-2s using a kit, supplied by Baldwin, consisting of the front 10-wheel frame and a boiler extension.

Although compounds had been considered obsolescent since the 1920s, C&O thought them appropriate, in the late 1940s, for low-speed coal-mine pickup runs converging on the classification yard at Russell, Kentucky. Only ten (of 25 originally ordered) were built before the order was cancelled, the last delivered in September 1949. The final loco, Chesapeake and Ohio 1309, is preserved on the Western Maryland Scenic Railroad. The 1309 was also the last steam locomotive that Baldwin built for the North American market.

The last compound Mallets to remain in use on a major North American railroad were the N&W class Y6b 2-8-8-2 locomotives, retired in July 1959. Norfolk & Western 2156 is the sole surviving Y6a, preserved at the National Museum of Transportation in St. Louis.

=== Simple expansion versions in the US ===
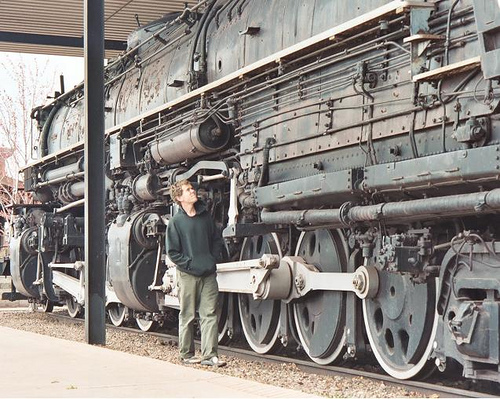
A Duluth, Missabe & Iron Range Railway 2-8-8-4 "Yellowstone" preserved at Two Harbors, Minnesota. Built in 1941 by Baldwin, this type was termed an articulated crossover compound Mallet, and produced over 140,000 pounds of tractive effort.

By about 1920, the U.S. version of the Mallet as a huge slow-speed pusher had reached a plateau; the size of the low-pressure cylinders became a limiting factor even on the large loading gauge permitted in the U.S., and reciprocating masses posed serious dynamic problems above walking pace. Moreover, there were adhesion stability problems where the front engine tended to slip and then stall uncontrollably because of an imbalance of tractive effort and axle load, accentuated by the drawbar reaction, and inability of the intermediate steam receiver to accommodate the sudden pressure change. This was further worsened by dynamic instability of the front end in running.

The Chesapeake and Ohio Railway introduced 25 simple (non-compound expansion) 2-8-8-2 locomotives in 1924 and 20 more in 1926. Although the simple-expansion concept diverged from Mallet's original patent, the locomotives were clearly a continuation of the concept and were still referred to as "Mallet" locomotives. As the front truck cylinders were now using boiler pressure steam, special arrangements were necessary to deliver it, through the truck pivot pin where only radial movement took place. These new locomotives took over service on a 113-mile (182 km) division; a single locomotive hauled 9,500 short tons (8,600 t; 8,500 long tons) in five hours.

Mallet development culminated in 1941 with the 4-8-8-4 Big Boy type on the Union Pacific railroad. They weighed 760,000 to 772,000 lb (345,000 to 350,000 kg) with a 434,000 lb (197,000 kg) tender; at 133 feet (40.54 m) long (including the tender), they could only be turned on a few of the system's turntables. They could develop 6,290 horsepower (4,690 kW) on the drawbar at 35 mph (56 km/h) and were designed for a top speed of 70 mph (110 km/h), though they rarely saw these speeds. Slightly shorter but even heavier and more powerful were 2-6-6-6s built by Lima for the C&O and the Virginian between 1941 and 1948, which weighed 778,000 lb (353,000 kg) and could produce up to 6,900 horsepower (5,100 kW) at 45 mph (72 km/h).

== The last Mallets ==
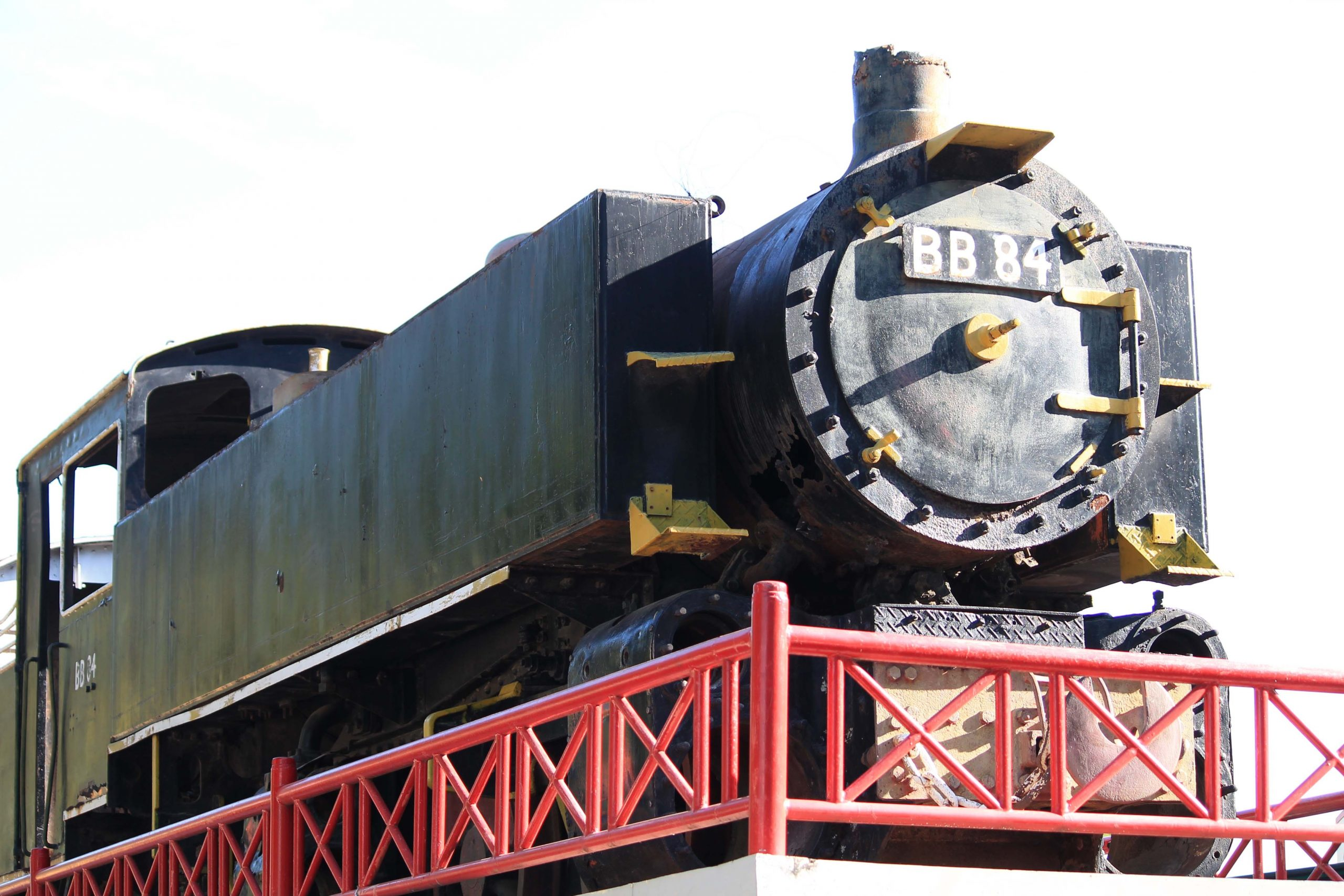
BB84 preserved as a monument in Banda Aceh

These U.S. locomotives were paralleled to some extent by heavy-haul versions in the USSR, though without any attempt at faster running. Two 2-8-8-4 examples built in Russia in 1954–55 were probably the last Mallets built in Europe. Four 0-4-4-2T locomotives numbered BB81 to BB84 were built by Nippon Sharyo in 1962 for the Indonesian State Railways' 750 mm (2 ft 5 1/2 in) Aceh railway line. They were probably the only Mallets to be built in Asia and the last Mallets ever built.

== Other continents ==
Although it had found early favor in Europe, especially on lightly engineered railways, the Mallet type was generally superseded by the Garratt locomotive by the mid-1920s.

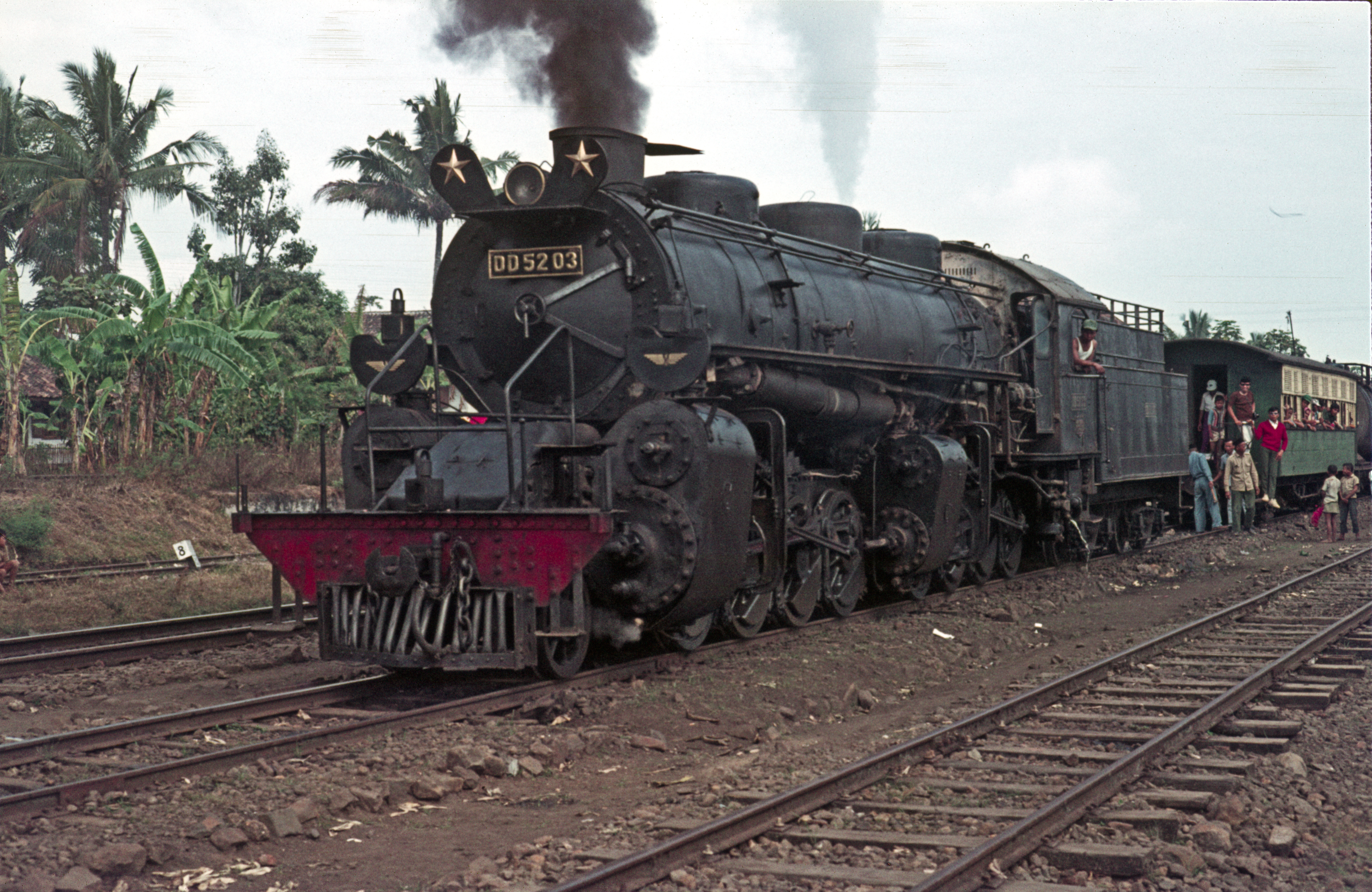
Indonesian Railways class DD52 in 1972

In the former Dutch East Indies, now Indonesia, Mallets of several types and sizes remained in use into the 1980s. The first generation of mallet used by Staatsspoorwegen (SS) was the 0-4-4-2T SS500 / BB10 class manufactured by Sächsische Maschinenfabrik (Hartmann) and Schwartzkopff, which came in 1899 for the mountainous track in West Java. SS later introduced the larger 2-6-6-0T SS 520 / CC10 class in 1904, built by several European manufacturers. Desiring for more powerful Mallets, SS ordered the 2-8-8-0 SS 1200 / DD50 class in 1916 and the improved SS 1209 / DD51 class in 1919 from ALCO. As SS considered the American-made Mallets uneconomical to operate due to high fuel consumption, they ordered another batch of 2-8-8-0 in 1923 from various European manufacturers, which were classed as the SS 1250 / DD52.

SS introduced the 2-6-6-0 SS 1600 / CC50 in 1927. The class filled the gap for more powerful Mallet than CC10 class, yet lighter than the DD52 class. In 1962, the Indonesian State Railways (DKA) ordered a series of 0-4-4-2Ts, basically an updated version of the earlier Dutch design, for the old Aceh tramway. Constructed by Nippon Sharyo in Japan, they were the only Mallets built in Asia. In contrast to the rest of the Indonesian railways it has a gauge of 750 mm (2 ft 5 1/2 in), in contrast to 1,067 mm (3 ft 6 in) used in Java and the rest of Sumatra. Smaller Mallets were used by plantations and other industries, all of the 0-4-4-0 type. These ran mostly on 600 mm (1 ft 11 5/8 in) and 700 mm (2 ft 3 9/16 in) gauge networks.

Mallets were employed in Brazilian 1,000 mm (3 ft 3 3/8 in) metre gauge, tight-radius railroads.

Two mallets ran in New Zealand. The first was the only mallet ever to work for the New Zealand Railways, and was built in 1906 at the NZR’s petone workshops. She was designated the only member of the NZR E class (1906), and was designed with rear facing rear cylinders and an 2-6-6-0 wheel arrangement. Designed to help the 6 NZR H class Fell locomotives haul increasing traffic on the world famous Rimutaka Incline, she was noted to be an incredibly powerful engine for her size and gauge. Notably, she could haul over 50% more tonnage up the incline without any use of the Fell centre rail that the H class engines used for extra adhesion. Unfortunately, conditions in the cab were described as hellish, and crew needed to wear a full cover of protective clothing in order to survive the 3 mile trip to summit without sustaining severe burns. In 1908, the NZR purchased the Wellington and Manawatu Railway Company, and with a new route to transport freight into and out of the capital that was faster and easier, traffic on the incline reduced so much that the 6 Fells were deemed capable of handling it on their own. Transferred to Wellington city in 1909, E66 was put to work banking on a steep section of this new route, which now makes up the Johnsonville Branch. Now on gentler track, she actually performed much worse than on the incline, and as wartime traffic increased in 1916, she was transferred back to the incline. Here she continued to suffer though, and after only 23 runs that year, she was scrapped in 1917.

the other mallet to run in New Zealand was a 2-4-4-2 mallet built for the Toupo Tōtara timber company. She managed to avoid the scrapyard after the lines closure, and is currently at Glenbrook Vintage Railway, Auckland, awaiting restoration.

Four Mallets ran in Australia, including two on the Magnet Tramway in Tasmania.

== Preservation ==
Several Mallets have been preserved, some in operational condition. Eight of the Union Pacific "Big Boys", are preserved around the nation, including one overlooking Omaha, Nebraska where UP is based. In January 2014, Big Boy #4014 was removed from its museum ground parking track in Pomona, California, and hauled to Cheyenne, Wyoming, for restoration to operating condition; this was completed in May 2019. No. 4014 is the largest, heaviest, and most powerful operational steam locomotive in the world.

Two of Union Pacific's Challengers survived into preservation. Challenger #3985 was the largest operational steam locomotive in the world until the restoration of UP 4014. It was taken out of service in October 2010 due to mechanical problems and retired from the Union Pacific's excursion program in January 2020. As of January 2023, No. 3985 is being restored to operating condition by the Railroading Heritage of Midwest America.

Chesapeake & Ohio 2-6-6-2 #1309, the last domestic steam locomotive built by Baldwin, was scheduled for restoration in September 2017. "New as they were, the last C&O steam engines never got adequate maintenance, lengthening the list of work needed to bring 1309 back to life." The locomotive was fired up and moved under her own steam on December 31, 2020, the first time she had done so in 64 years. On December 17, 2021, C&O 1309 (now WMSR 1309) entered excursion service on the Western Maryland Scenic Railroad.

The single surviving example of a cab-forward Mallet is Southern Pacific 4294, on display at the California State Railroad Museum in Sacramento, California.

Several smaller logging-railroad Mallets have been restored to operating condition, including 2-6-6-2T Black Hills Central #110 in Hill City, South Dakota, 2-6-6-2T Clover Valley Lumber Company #4 in Sunol, California, and 2-4-4-2 Columbia River Belt Line #7 "Skookum" in Garibaldi, Oregon (#7 is currently based in Sunol with #4).

Three Indonesian State Railways Mallet classes were preserved, consisting of a 0-4-4-2T BB10 class, 3 units of 2-6-6-0 CC50 class, and a 0-4-4-2T BB84. The BB10 12 which was manufactured in 1902 by Sächsische Maschinenfabrik and CC50 29 manufactured in Swiss Locomotive and Machine Works (SLM) are preserved at the Ambarawa Railway Museum. While the CC50 22, the Dutch-built Werkspoor Indonesian Mallet had been returned to the Netherlands and is now exhibited in the Dutch Railway Museum. Meanwhile, another of the CC50 class, the CC50 01 is preserved at Transportation Museum in Taman Mini Indonesia Indah (TMII). The BB84 of Aceh railway is preserved as a monument in Banda Aceh city.

Another industrial type has been purchased and restored by the Statfold Barn Railway in the UK. This saw its first operation in Europe in 2011 and after initial trials on the owners' railway, was transferred to the Welsh Highland Railway as its power is better suited to that railway.

A number of Mallets were constructed for the Nordhausen Wernigerode Eisenbahn, now part of the Harz Narrow Gauge Railways system in Germany. Running numbers 99 5901-3 and 99 5906 are in working order.

The Blonay–Chamby museum railway has two Mallets. First to be acquired was the Hanomag G 2x 3/3 0-6-6-0 No104. At 56 tonnes this locomotive was one of the largest steam metre gauge locos ever built in Europe. It was in service until 1979, and as of September 2021 is still under restoration. There is also a G 2x 2/2 0-4-4-0 No.105 built by Maschinenfabrik Karlsruhe. As of September 2021 it hauls tourist trains on 5% grades.

ABPF-SC (Brazilian Association for Railroad Preservation – Santa Catarina branch) has restored a 2-6-6-2 Mallet to working order. It hauls tourist steam trains on 3% grades. The first official train ran on April 30, 2017.

== Terminology ==
As a French-speaking Swiss, Mallet pronounced his name accordingly, something like "Ma-lay".

Mallet's original patent specifies compound expansion, but after his death in 1919 many locomotives (particularly in the United States) were articulated Mallet style without using compounding (for instance the Union Pacific Big Boy). When fleets of such locomotives appeared in the middle 1920s the trade press called them "Simple Mallets" — i.e., simple locomotives articulated like Mallets. The term "Mallet" continued to be widely used for simple as well as compound locomotives.

Examples of Mallet locomotives
A restored 2-6-6-2 Mallet #204, ABPF, Rio Negrinho, Santa Catarina, Brazil

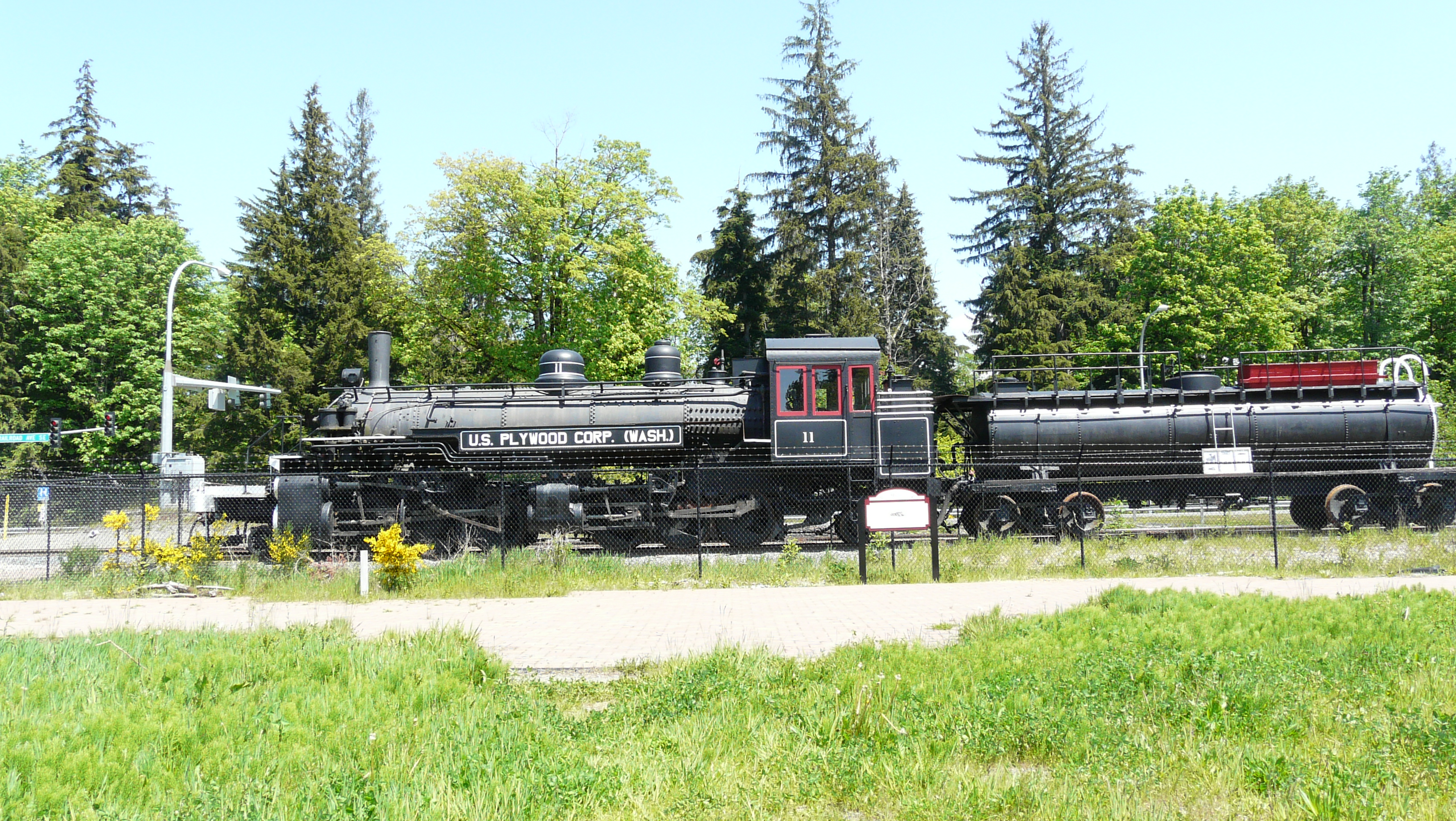
A 2-6-6-2 Mallet locomotive at the Northwest Railway Museum in Snoqualmie, Washington

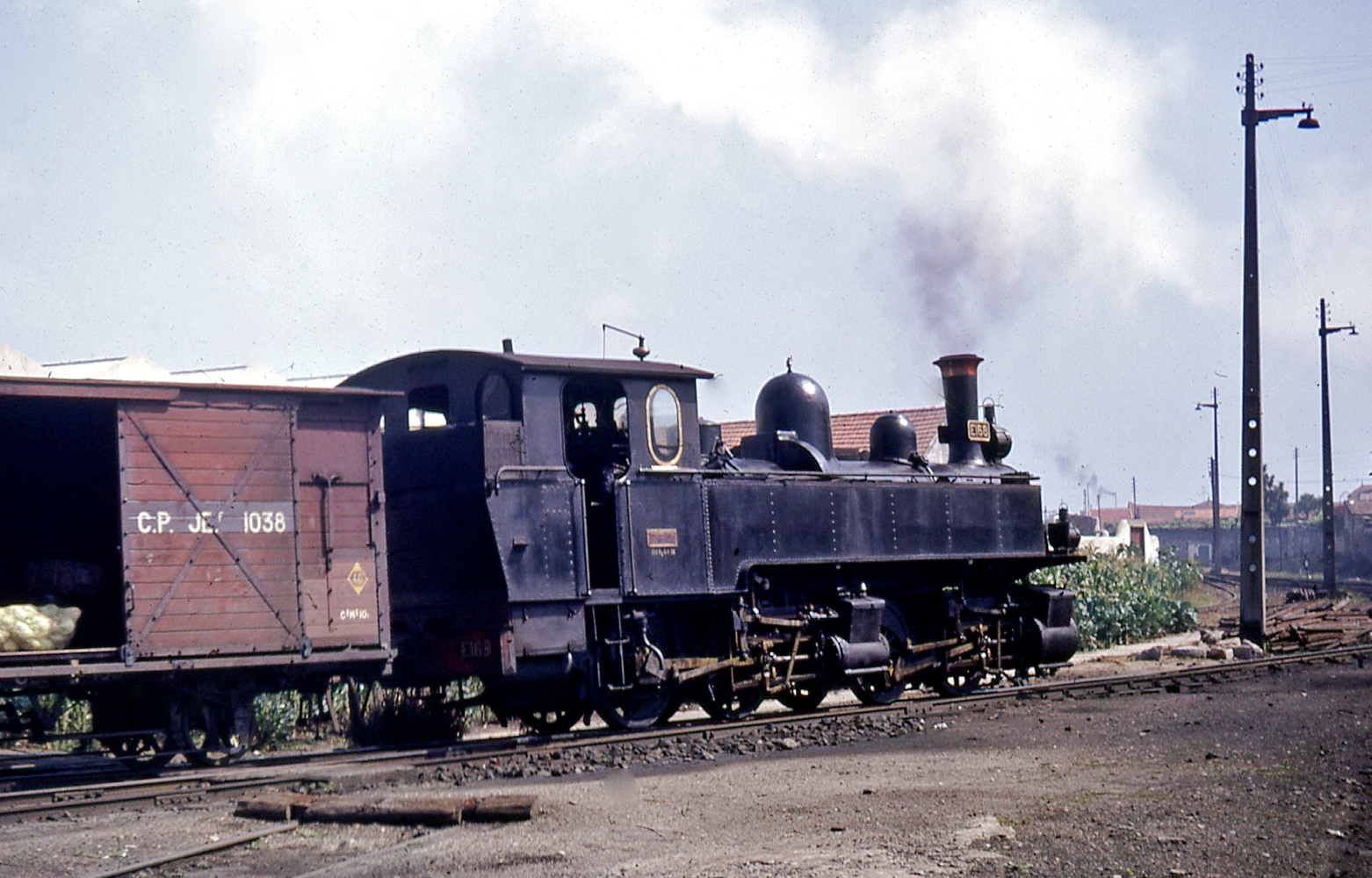
Portuguese Railways Mallet locomotive No. E168 at Povoa da Varzim, August 1970

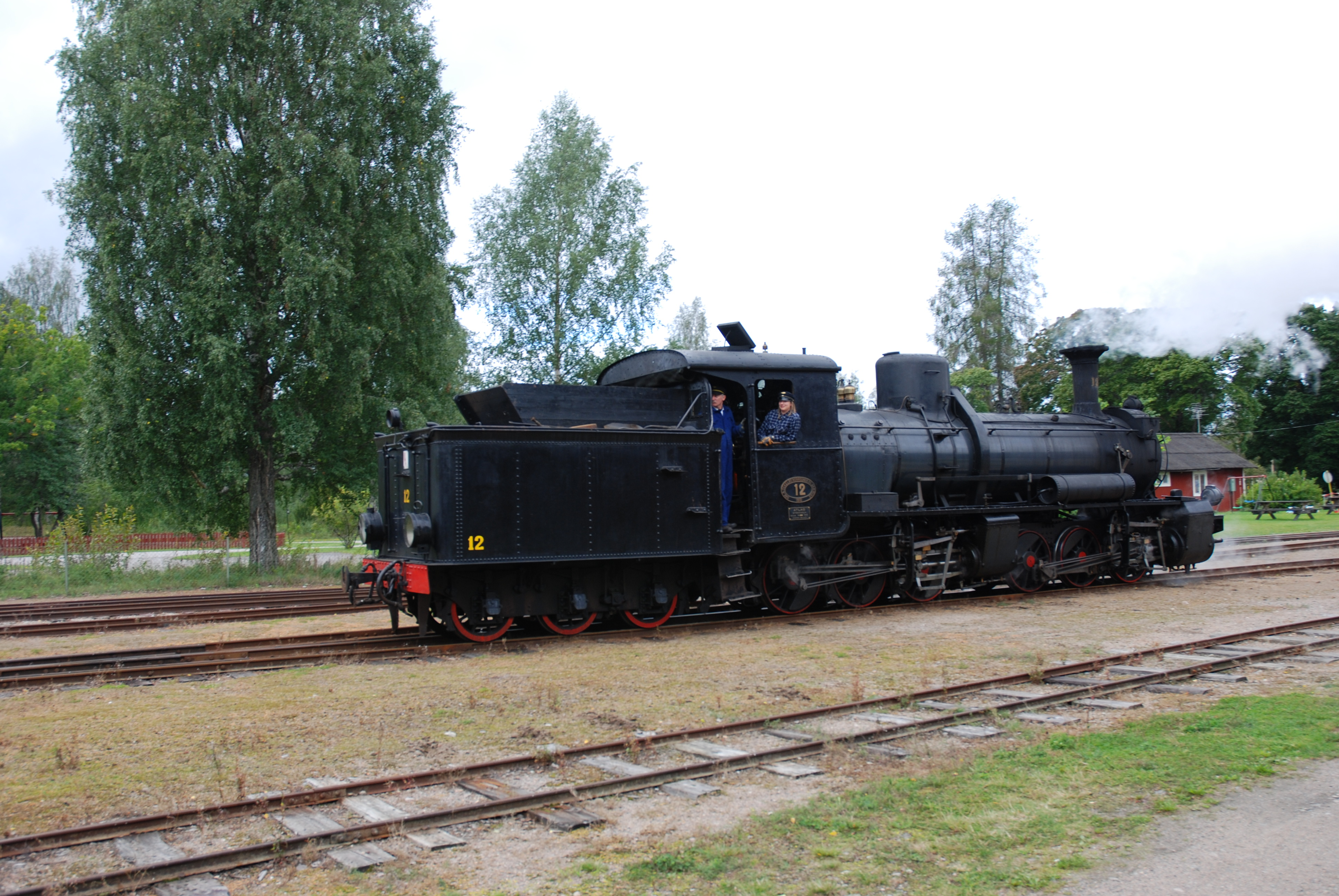
Swedish-built Mallet locomotive DONJ No 12 in Jädraås, Sweden, August 2009

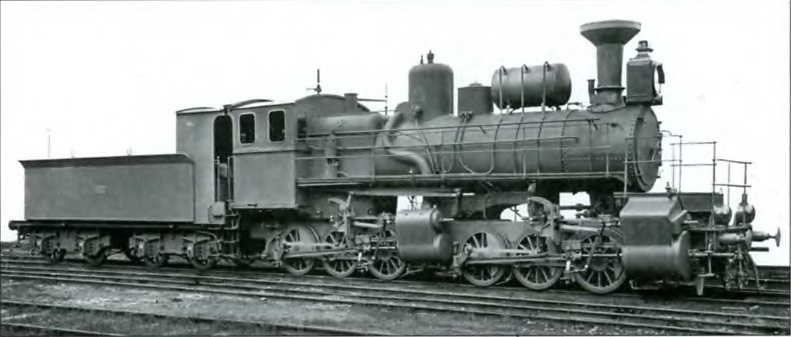
Russian Mallet locomotive Fita (Ө) series in 1899. Note piston valves on high-pressure cylinders and slide valves on low-pressure cylinders

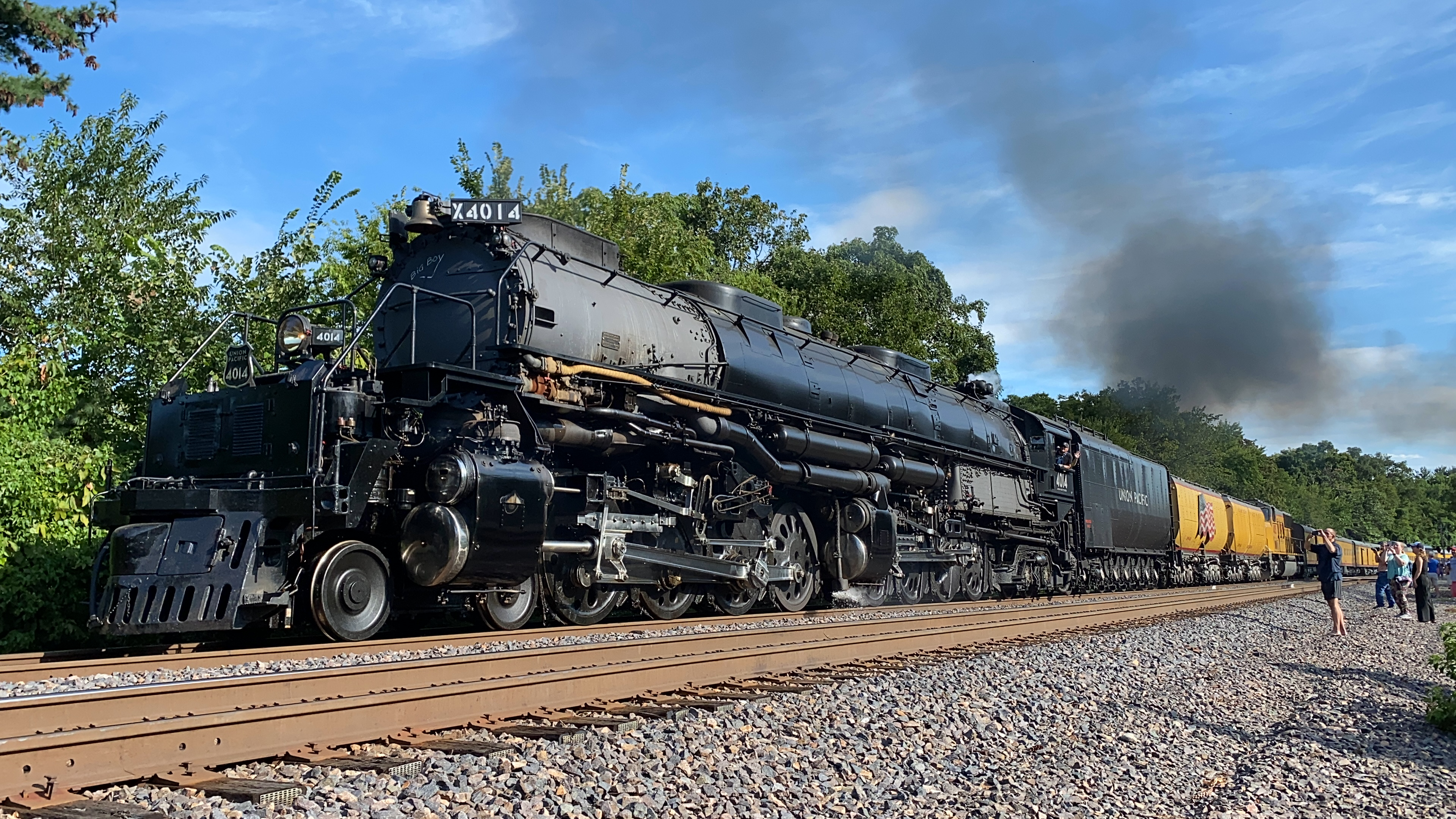
"Union Pacific Big Boy", an example of a simple Mallet. This type is generally regarded as the largest steam locomotive in the world.

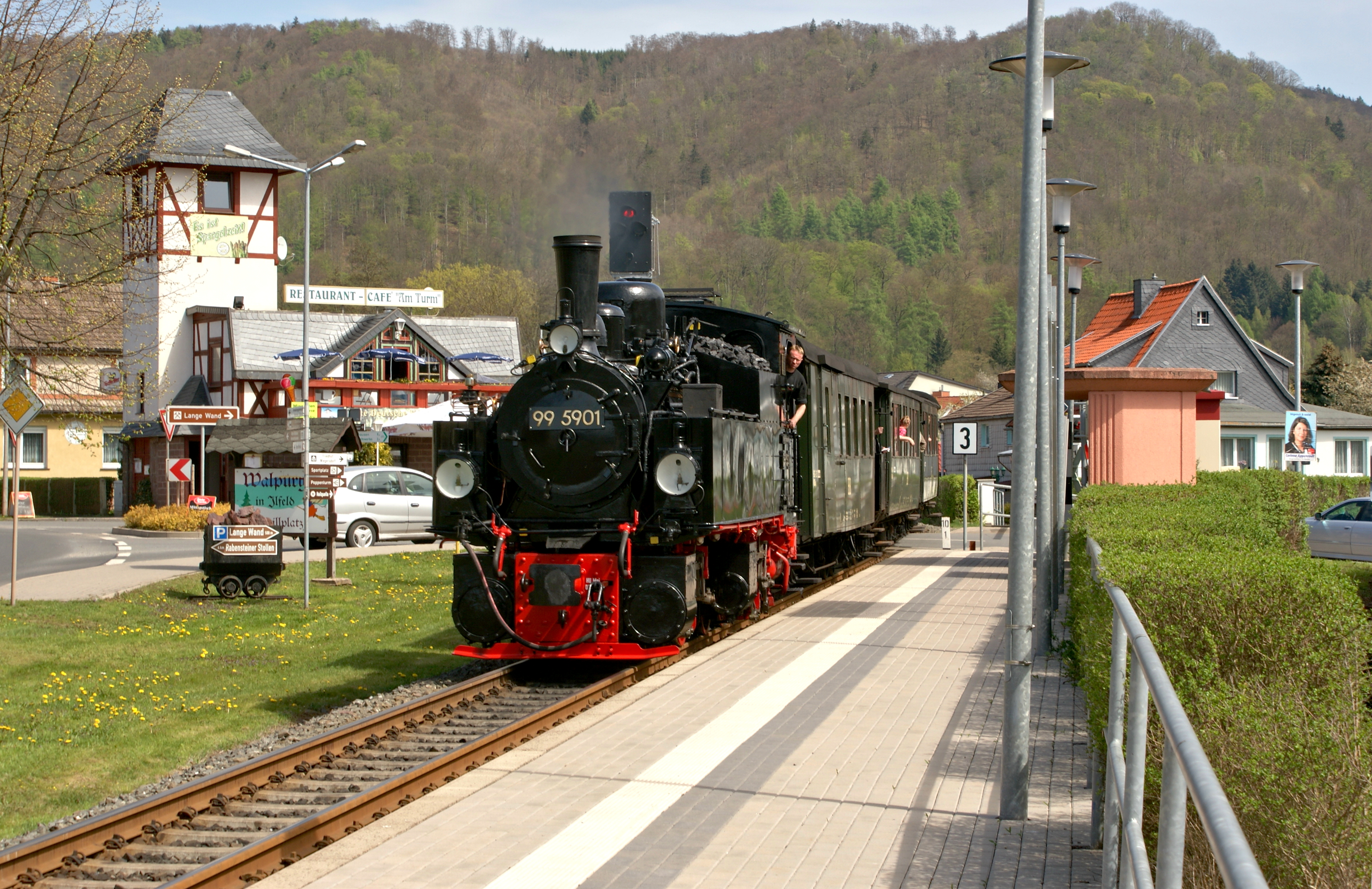
Harz Narrow Gauge Railways 99 5901

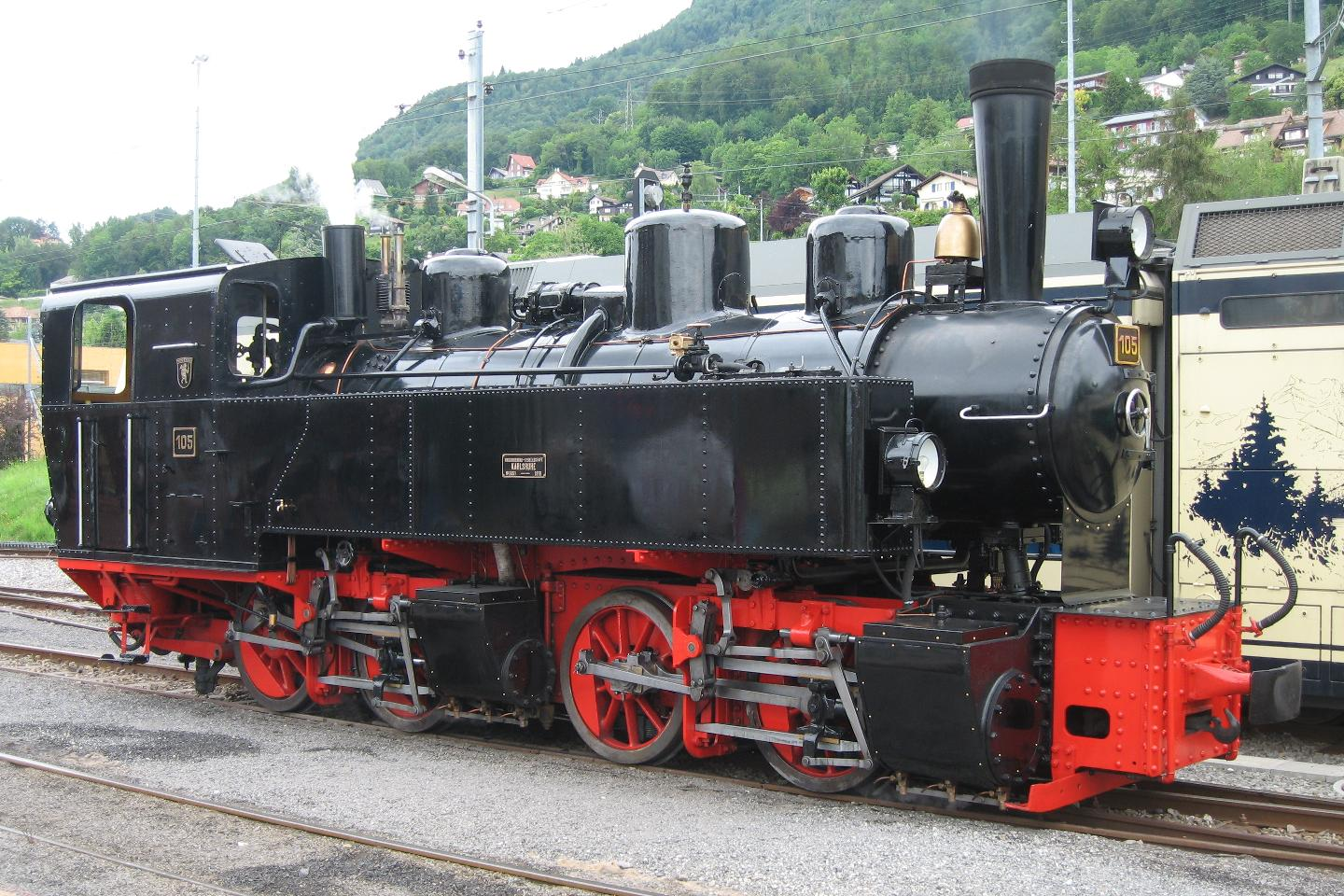
0-4-4-0 metre gauge Mallet built by Maschinenbau-Gesellschaft Karlsruhe, operated commercially by the Zell im Wiesental–Todtnau railway and as of 2021 preserved and still operating at the Blonay–Chamby museum railway

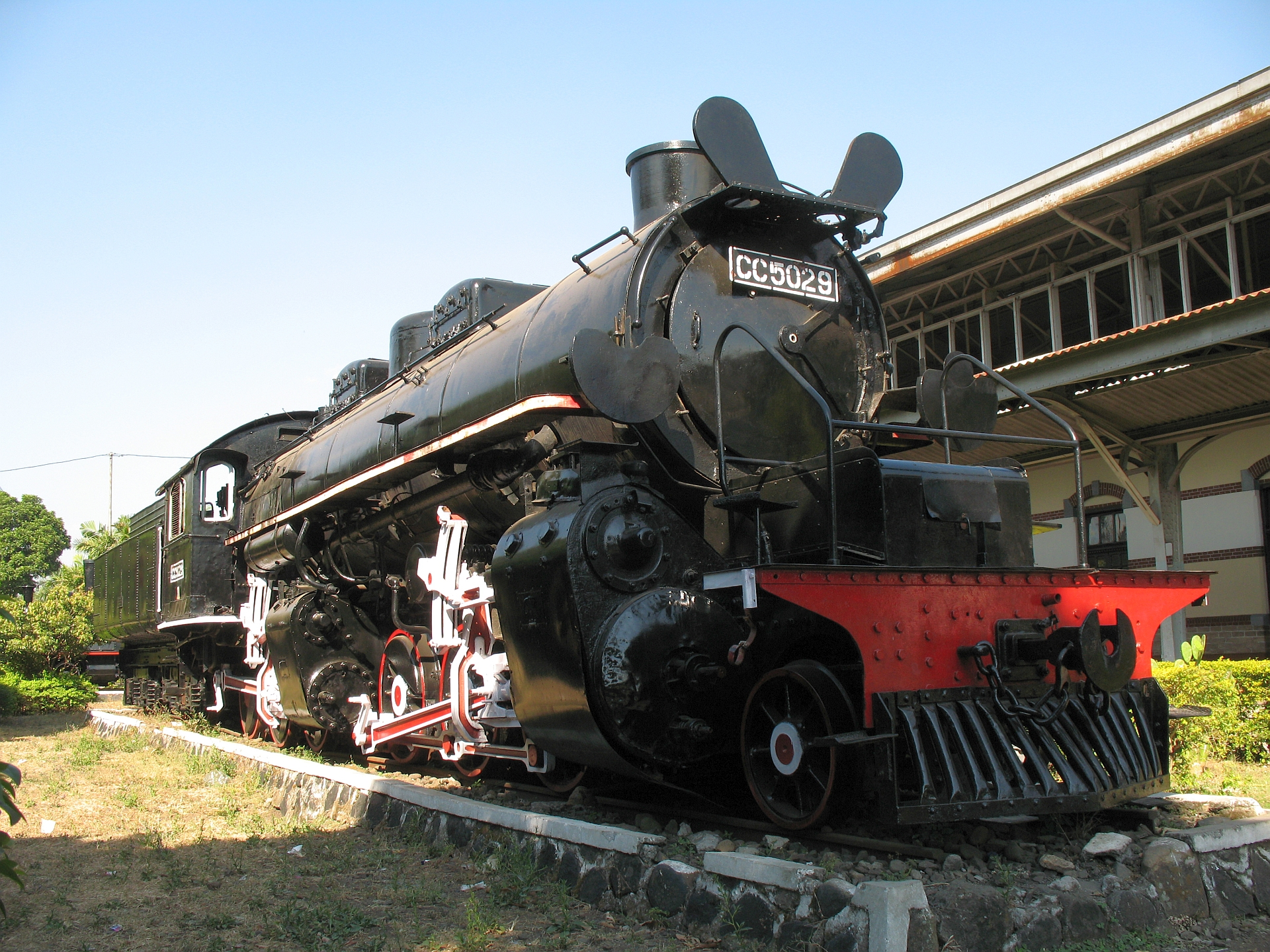
The DKA 2-6-6-0 or CC50 29 preserved in Ambarawa Railway Museum

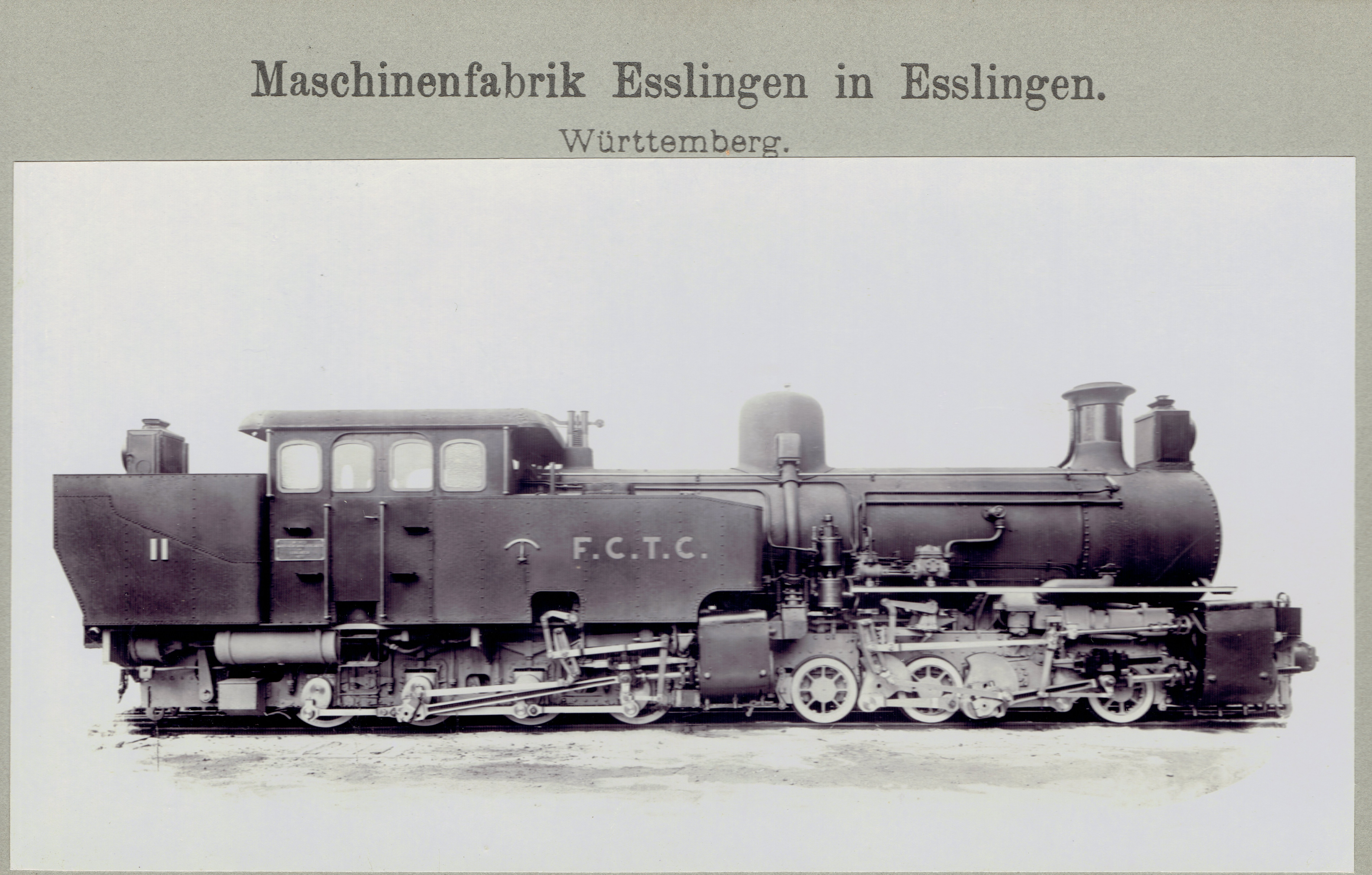
Mallet rack locomotive (System Abt) of the Transandine Railway
