= Staatsspoorwegen =

Railway company of the Dutch East Indies

Dienst der Staatsspoor- en Tramwegen in Nederlandsch–Indië

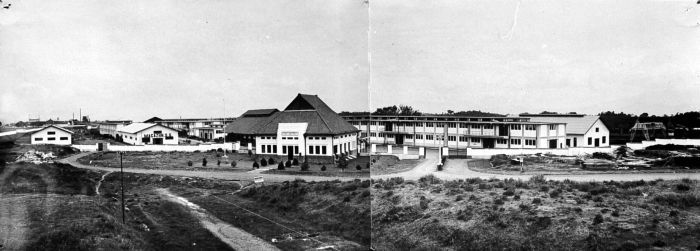
- The Staatsspoorwegen's material stock at Bandung

Overview
- Headquarters: Bandung, Dutch East Indies
- Locale: Dutch East Indies
- Dates of operation: 6 April 1875–1950
- Successor: Kereta Api Indonesia

Technical
- Track gauge: 1,067 mm (3 ft 6 in); 750 mm (2 ft 5 1/2 in) (Aceh tramway); 600 mm (1 ft 11 5/8 in) (SS tramway in Java)
- Length: 2,742.5 km 1,704.1 mi (1928)

Staatsspoorwegen (Dutch for State Railways, full name: Dienst der Staatsspoor- en Tramwegen in Nederlandsch–Indië (State Railways and Tramways Service in the Netherlands Indies, SS en T), commonly abbreviated as SS) was a state-owned railway company managed by the Dutch East Indies colonial government. It was absorbed into the present Kereta Api Indonesia after Indonesian independence in 1945. The main competitor was Nederlandsch-Indische Spoorweg Maatschappij (NIS) as private-owned railways company which had standard gauge and cape gauge lines.

Staatsspoorwegen operated railways with three gauges: 3 ft 6 in (1,067 mm) for heavy lines, and 750 mm (2 ft 5 1/2 in) and 2 ft (610 mm) for tramways.

== History ==
According to the Verslag der Handelingen van Staten-Generaal (Report of the Proceedings of the States General), there are proposals for the connection of two Nederlandsch-Indische Spoorweg Maatschappij (NIS) railway lines which are extended to Surabaya and continued to Pasuruan, and the route from Depok to the eastern region of Bogor Regency (Buitenzorg) which is said to be fertile. The proposal was made by Mr. P.P. van Bosse before the States General in November 1873 at the same time evaluating two NIS railway lines, namely Batavia-Buitenzorg and Samarang-Vorstenlanden (Surakarta and Yogyakarta) which had been operated since May 21, 1873.

However, NIS had experienced a deficit in capital injection since the operation of the two railway lines that were built. In fact, the company had repeatedly been threatened with bankruptcy.

Although Java was said to be the most advanced island in the Dutch East Indies, access to transportation at that time was still limited because it still used the road mode which was only supported by carts, horse-drawn carriages, and canoes to cross the river. The cost of transportation by these modes was very expensive because agricultural and plantation products sold to big cities are not sold well, because they were no longer hygienic while transportation takes a long time.

In the end, with the enactment of Staatsblad (official gazette) No. 141, at the request of the successors of P.P. van Bosse (Fransen van der Putte and Baron van Goldstein), the colonial government officially intervened to build the railway line and a company was formed which was later known as Staatsspoorwegen Nederlandsch-Indië (Netherlands Indies State Railways). This company was founded on 6 April 1875 based on the enactment.

=== First period of railway construction in Java (until 1900) ===
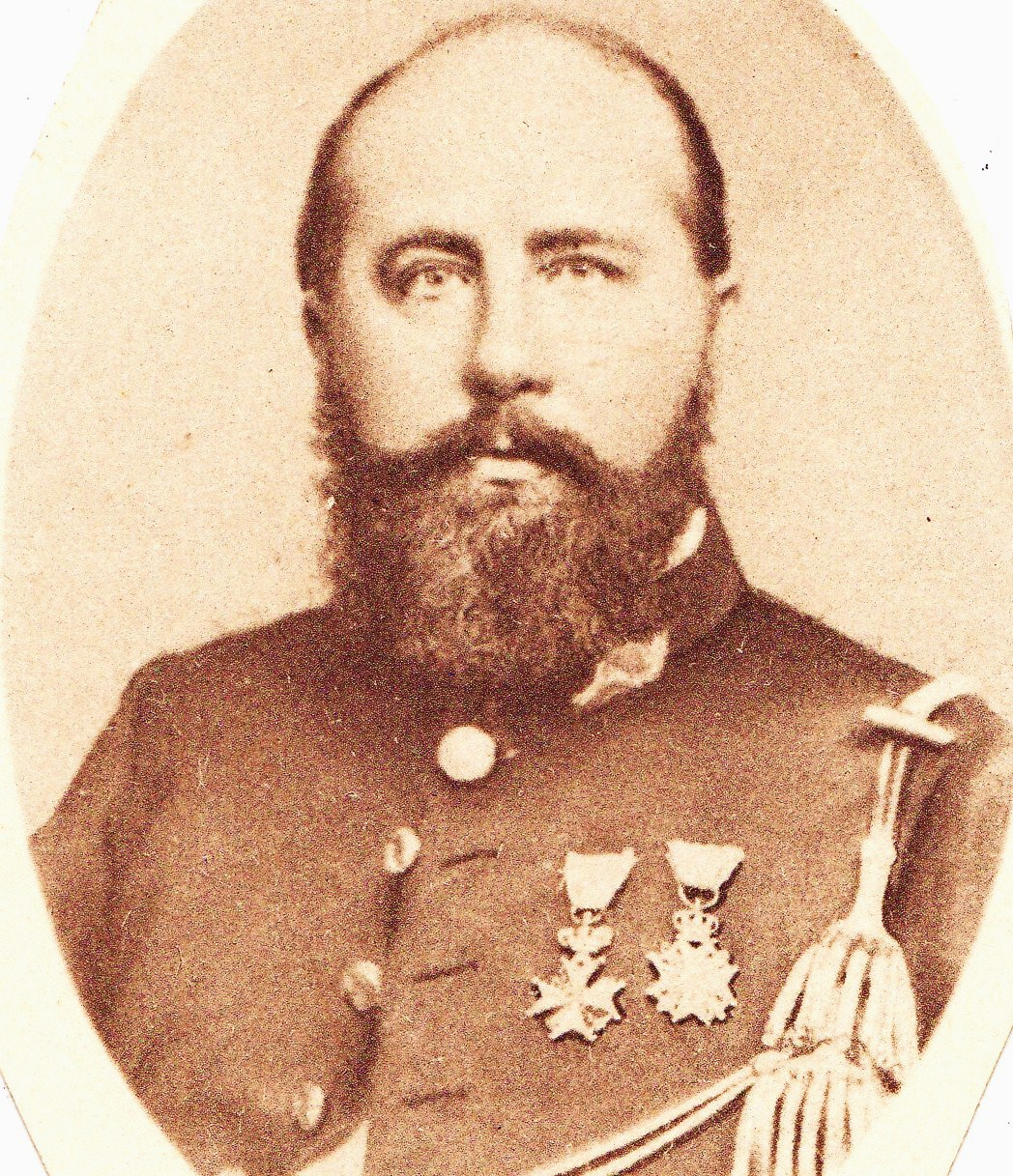
Maarschalk, D. as the first chief director of SS

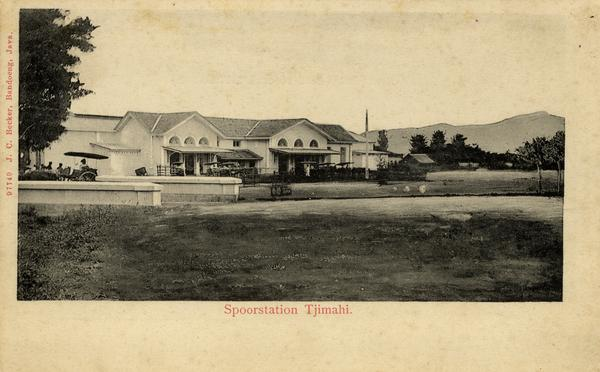
Cimahi railway station.

The first railway construction was divided into :

- Bogor (Buitenzorg)–Padalarang–Bandung–Banjar–Kasugihan–Kutoarjo–Yogyakarta,
- Surabaya–Sidoarjo–Tulangan–Mojokerto–Madiun–Solo Jebres,
- Sidoarjo–Pasuruan, and
- Bangil–Malang.

The figure who holds the key to the success of the railroad is David Maarschalk, a former officer of the Royal Netherlands East Indies Army (KNIL), who later switched professions to become a railway technician. Together with Johannes Groll as his colleague who was also appointed by the Dutch to become a senior SS officer (Maarschalk was the first Head of the SS Service), Maarschalk designed a route map for the railroad lines until he stepped down from his position in 1880. Apart from being a leader in the construction of these lines, Maarschalk also had the idea to build the Transvaal railroad (part of Netherlands-South African Railway Company) in South Africa in 1884, taking inspiration from these lines.

=== Second period of railway construction in Java (1900-1920) ===
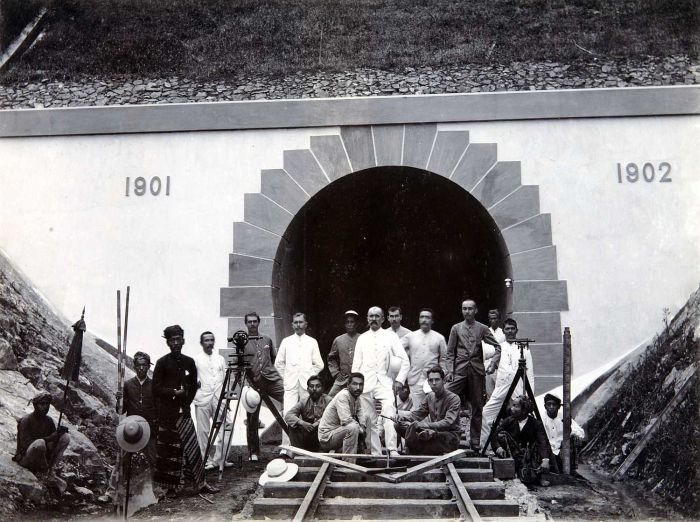
Garahan railway tunnel in Jember which was completed in 1902 by SS (Tropenmuseum)

Staatsspoorwegen (SS) began to acquire several railroad lines that were previously managed by private companies, here some lists some of the lines that were acquired by them:

Railway lines	Recognized date	Acquired from
Batavia–Karawang	August 4, 1898	Bataviasche Oosterspoorweg Maatschappij
Jombang–Babat	Desember 1, 1916	Babat–Djombang Stoomtram Maatschappij
Jombang–Babat	November 1 1918	Kediri Stoomtram Maatschappij
Batavia–Buitenzorg (Bogor)	November 1, 1913	Nederlandsch-Indische Spoorweg Maatschappij

== Construction of lines outside Java ==
In developing railways outside Java Island, Staatsspoorwegen formed several divisions for the Sumatra and Sulawesi regions, there are :

1. Sumatra region :
  - Atjeh Tramwegen for railway line in Aceh.
  - Staatsspoorwegen ter Sumatra's Westkust (SSS) for railway transport in West Sumatra.
  - Zuid-Sumatra Staatsspoorwegen (ZSS) for railway transport in South Sumatra.
  - Staatstramwegen in Tapanoeli for railway lines in Tapanuli, North Sumatra but it was abandoned.
2. Sulawesi (Celebes) region :
  - Staatstramwegen op Celebes for railway lines of Sulawesi.

== Staatsspoorwegen 50th Anniversary Commemoration (1925) ==
To celebrate 50 years of this company, Topografische Inrichting released a book entitled Gedenkboek der Staatsspoor en Tramwegen in Nederlandsch-Indie, 1875-1925. compiled from the work of Steven Anne Reitsma who was the mayor of Bandung at the time and the writing of the book began in 1924. This book was a brief history of the company, a summary of the SS's annual reports as well as a number of photographs of SS trains. This book was then made available in Dutch and Basic Malay. The Dutch version is 216 pages, while the Malay version is only 94 pages. Several stations had been rebuilt with new buildings to commemorate the company's anniversary, there are Tanjung Priuk railway station and Pasar Senen railway station.

== Wartime period ==
After the Dutch East Indies government declared its resignation and surrendered to the Japanese in 1942, since then, the railroad companies in Java were immediately taken over by the Japanese military administration and was placed under the administration of Rikuyu Sōkyoku (陸輸総局; lit. 'Land Transport General Bureau'). By Japanese rule, railroad operations were focused on war interests and the transportation of coal mining products to run their war machines.

Indonesia had already proclaimed its independence on August 17, 1945. Then, a few days later the train station and head office were taken over directly from the Japanese. By September 28, 1945 was the climax event signed by the takeover of the Railway Headquarters in Bandung. Therefore it is commemorated as Indonesian Railways Day and at the same time marked as the establishment of the Railways Service of the Republic of Indonesia (DKA-RI) - the current day Kereta Api Indonesia. By 1946, the Dutch returned to Indonesia and re-formed a railway company in Indonesia called Staatsspoorwegen / Verenigde Spoorwegbedrif (SS/VS), which was a combination of SS and all private railway companies, except Deli Spoorweg Maatschappij. Following the end of the National Revolution, SS/VS was fused into DKARI effective January 1950, with the entire SS network nationalized.

== See also ==
- History of rail transport in Indonesia
