= French locomotive classification =

Under the French classification system for locomotive wheel arrangements, the system is slightly different for steam and electric/diesel vehicles.

== Steam ==
The French system counts axles, rather than wheels. As with Whyte notation, a conventional rigid locomotive will have three digits corresponding to its axle configuration:

The first digit is the number of leading unpowered axles; the second digit the number of powered axles; The third digit the number of trailing unpowered axles.

=== Examples ===
0-6-0 = 030

2-6-0 = 130

0-6-2 = 031

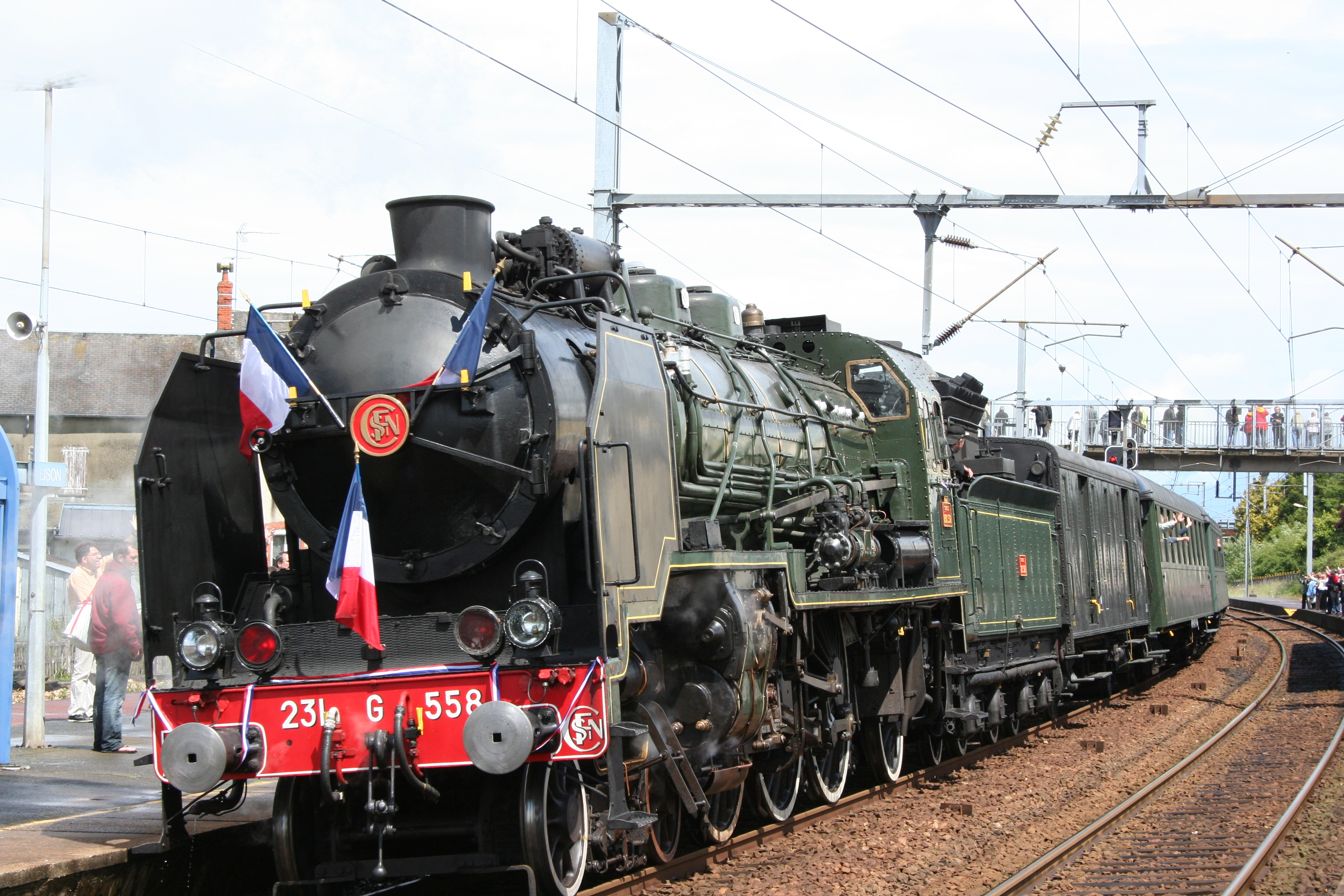
SNCF 231G 558 pulling an excursion train in June 2009

4-6-2 = 231

2-8-0 = 140

4-8-0 = 240

4-6-4 = 232

4-8-4 = 242

2-6-6-2 = 130+031

== Electric and diesel ==
With electric and diesel vehicles include DMUs a letter A-B-C-D replaces 1-2-3-4 for the number of powered axles, and each bogie is grouped separately.

0-4-0+0-4-0 = B-B (if axles connected by rods or other means)

0-6-0+0-6-0 = Co-Co (if axles driven independently)

== See also ==
- UIC classification
