= Turkish locomotive classification =

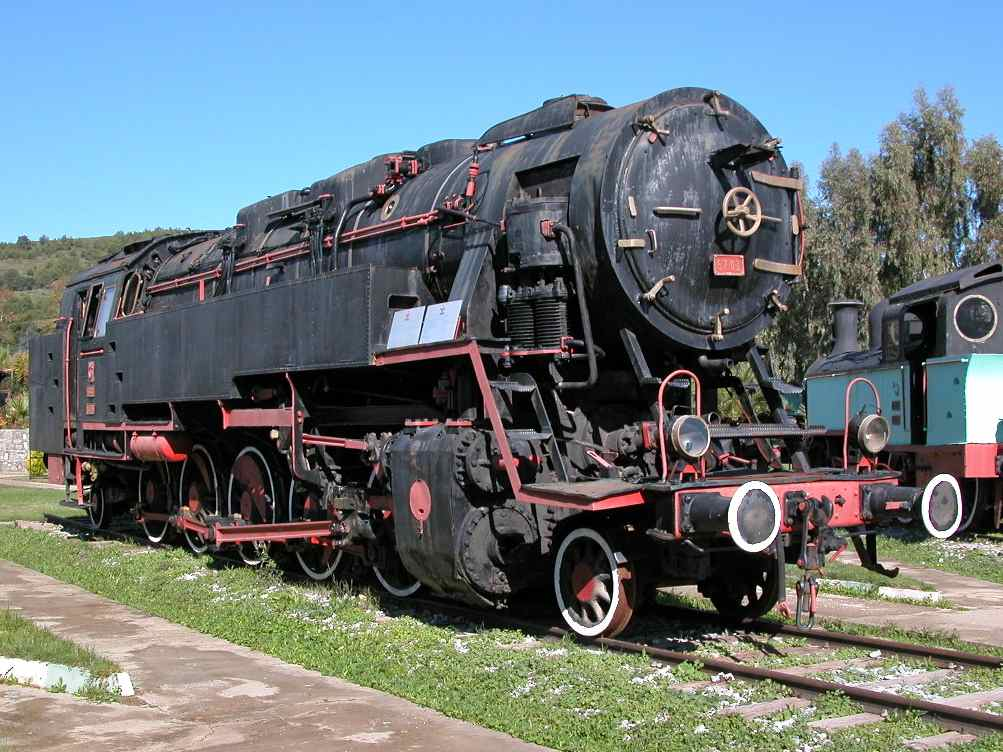

In the Turkish classification system for railway locomotives, the number of powered axles are followed by the total number of axles. It is identical to the Swiss system except that the latter places a slash between the two numbers.

Thus

0-6-0 becomes 33

4-6-2 becomes 36

2-6-4 becomes 36

2-8-0 becomes 45

== See also ==
- UIC classification system
