= Ambarawa Railway Museum =

Ambarawa Station Stasiun Ambarawa
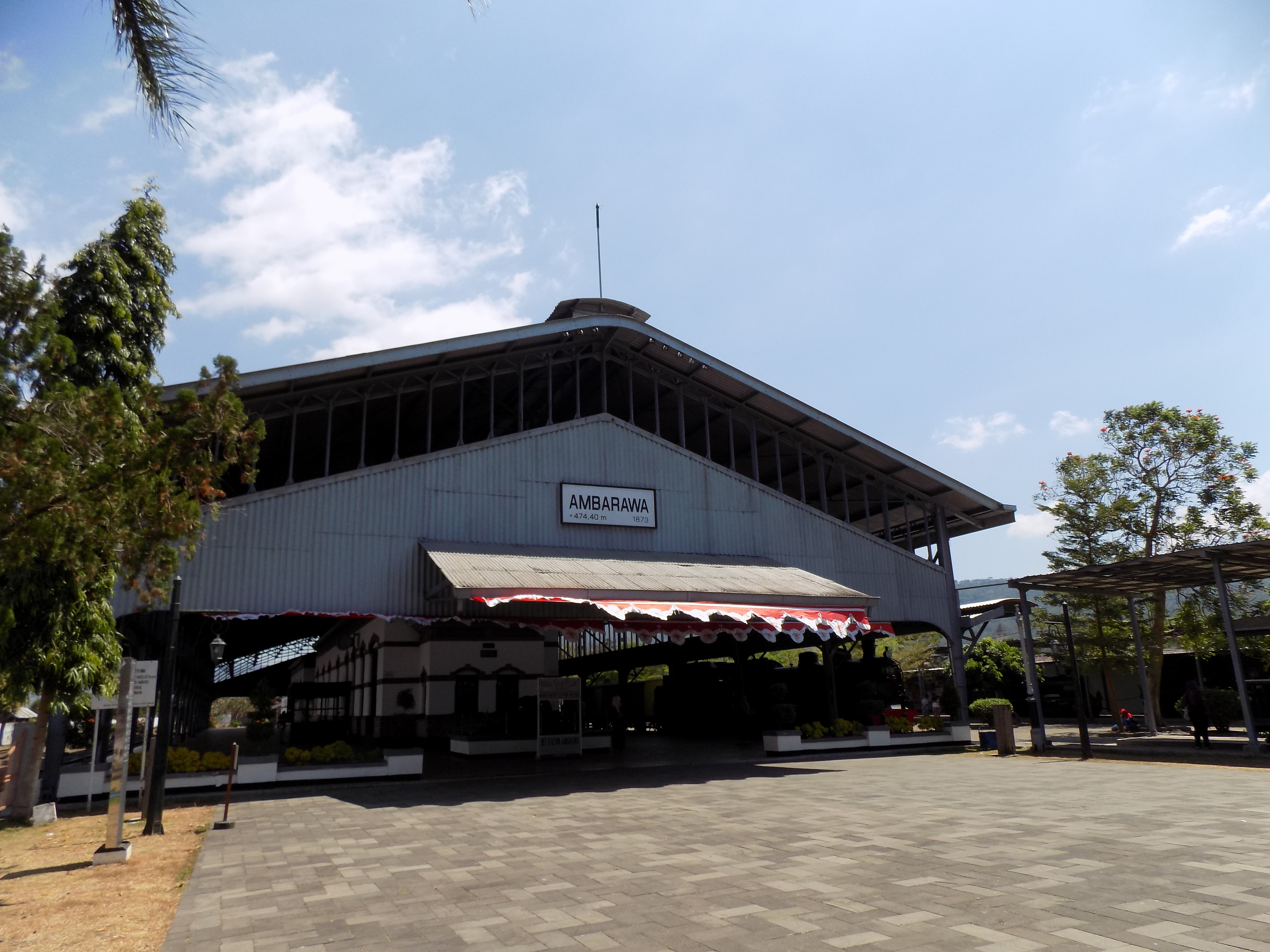
- Front view of Indonesian Railway Museum (2019)

General information
- Location: Jl. Stasiun, Panjang, Ambarawa, Semarang Regency; Central Java; Indonesia
- Coordinates: 7°15′56″S 110°24′05″E
- Elevation: +474.40 m (1,556.4 ft)
- Owner: Kereta Api Indonesia
- Operator: Kereta Api Indonesia
- Line: Kedungjati–Secang
- Platforms: single island platform
- Tracks: 4

Construction
- Structure type: Ground
- Parking: Available
- Accessible: Available

Other information
- Station code: ABR • 3306
- Classification: Class II

History
- Opened: 21 May 1873
- Closed: 8 April 1976
- Former names: Willem I Station
Location
- Location within Java

Indonesian Railway Museum, Ambarawa
- Museum Kereta Api Ambarawa
- Interactive map
- Established: 6 October 1976
- Location: Jl. Stasiun, Panjang, Ambarawa, Semarang Regency, Central Java, Indonesia
- Coordinates: 7°15′56″S 110°24′05″E
- Type: Railway museum
- Owner: Kereta Api Indonesia

The Ambarawa Railway Museum (Indonesian: Museum Kereta Api Ambarawa, officially named Indonesian Railway Museum by the Indonesian Railway Company) is a museum located in Ambarawa in Central Java, Indonesia. The museum preserves around 21 steam locomotives and focuses on tourism train tours hauled by 3 operational steam engines (both are rack locomotives and a 4-4-0 two-cylinder compound steam engine) and a hydraulic diesel engine, using the remains of the closure of the 3 ft 6 in (1,067 mm) railway line.

== Museum building and location ==
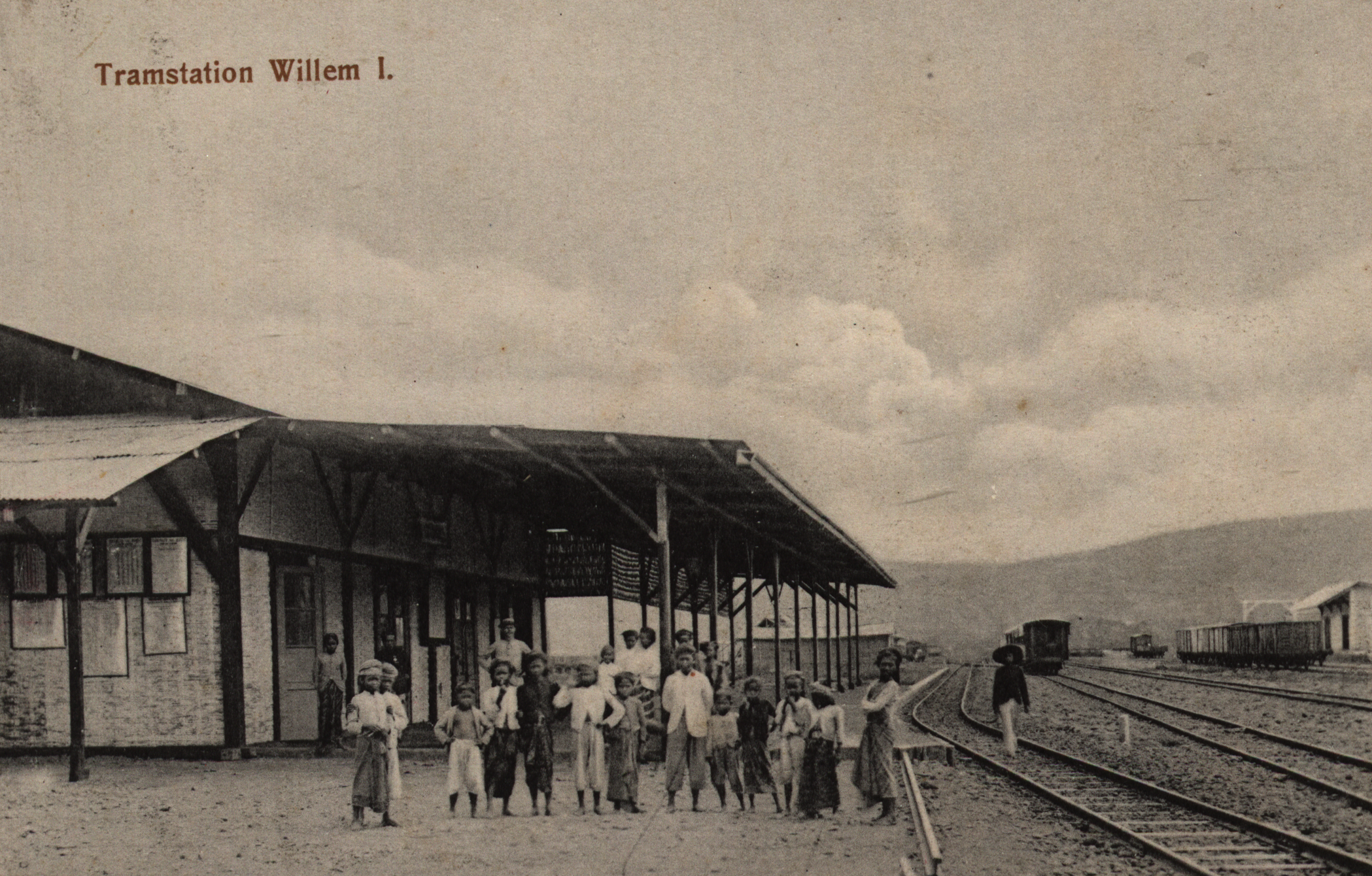
First view of Willem I station (now Ambarawa station) before being enlarged.

Ambarawa was a city that was used for military purposes during the Dutch colonial administration and not far from this station, there's Fort Willem I, known as Benteng Pendem by locals. This station was named Willem I because it was built in honor of the services of the King of the Netherlands William I. The colonial government of the Dutch East Indies under the command of Governor-General L. A. J. Baron Sloet van de Beele ordered the construction of a new railway station to facilitate the mobilization of Royal Netherlands East Indies Army (KNIL) troops from and to Semarang. On 21 May 1873, the Ambarawa railway station was built on a 127,500 m² land. It was finished at the same time as the Kedungjati–Bringin–Tuntang–Ambarawa line by Nederlandsch-Indische Spoorweg Maatschappij (NIS).

The station building consists of two main buildings for waiting room and the station master room.

The Willem I railway station was originally a transshipment point between the 4 ft 8 1/2 in (1,435 mm) gauge branch from Kedungjati to the northeast and the 3 ft 6 in (1,067 mm) gauge line onward towards Yogyakarta via Magelang to the south. It is still possible to see that the two sides of the station were built to accommodate different-sized trains.

On 8 April 1976, the Ambarawa railway station was officially converted into the Ambarawa Railway Museum by the governor of Central Java Province at that time Supardjo Rustam. The museum preserves the steam locomotives, which were then coming to the end of their useful lives when the 3 ft 6 in (1,067 mm) gauge railways of the Indonesian State Railway (the Perusahaan Negara Kereta Api, PNKA) was closed. These are parked in the open air next to the original station.

In 2010, the building of Ambarawa Railway Museum was made a heritage building.

=== Railway line ===
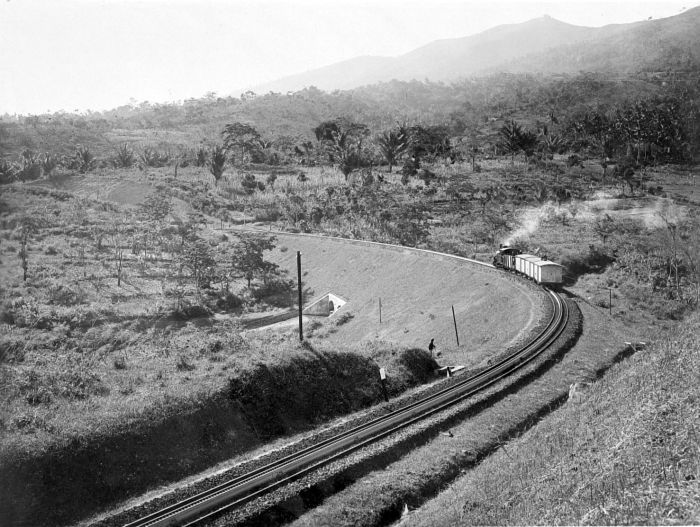
The 1067mm line that connects Magelang station and Willem I station, the station that is now a museum.

The construction line between Ambarawa–Samarang (or called Semarang today) was a package with Samarang NIS–Gundih–Solo Balapan–Lempuyangan line. In 1869, after Gundih, the NIS continued the line to Bringin and ended at Ambarawa. Finally, Samarang–Vorstenlanden (now Surakarta and Jogjakarta) and Kedungjati to Ambarawa lines were completed on 21 May 1873. After that, the NIS continued to build rack line to Secang with the line passing through the steep contours and difficult topography in the mountainous area. This line connected the Dutch East Indies military stronghold in Magelang city with Fort Willem I in Ambarawa, and it was finished on 1 February 1905. The 3 ft 6 in (1,067 mm) gauge line towards Djocja Toegoe (Yogyakarta) (runs roughly south-west from Ambarawa) was of particular interest because it contained sections of rack railway between Jambu and Secang which have 6.5% gradient, the only such operation in Java. This line beyond Bedono closed in the early 1970s after it was damaged in an earthquake, but had already lost most of its passenger traffic to buses on the parallel road. The line from Kedungjati (runs east initially from Ambarawa) survived into the middle 1970s but saw very little traffic near the end, not least because it was far quicker to travel more directly by road to Semarang. The presence of the rack line meant that there was probably never much through traffic from Semarang to Yogyakarta.

== Services ==
The museum is open daily from 8 a.m. to 5 p.m. in a week. Currently, there are 3 kinds of heritage tourism trains running, the excursion trains run on Ambarawa–Jambu–Bedono (mountainous rack line) pulled by B25 02 or B25 03 and Ambarawa–Tuntang (flat line) pulled by B51 12. While, the vintage train pulled by hydraulic-diesel D301 24 also on Ambarawa-Tuntang line, could be rented. The excursion trains are rented and can be booked around 2–3 weeks before departure, with an exceptional vintage train runs regularly (pulled by hydraulic-diesel D301 24) with the ticket price listed. Admission to the museum is divided into 3 categories :

1. For kids (3–12 years old) and students : Rp 10.000,00 (US$0.67)

2. Adults (local) and scholars : Rp 20.000 (US$1.34)

3. Foreigners : Rp 30.000 (US$2.01)

== Collection ==
The museum has a collection of 26 steam locomotives from several railway companies of the former Dutch East Indies (now Indonesia) which were acquired by Djawatan Kereta Api (DKA) or Department of Railways of the Republic of Indonesia. Currently four locomotives are operational. Other collections of the museum include old telephones, Morse telegraph equipment, old bells and signals equipment, and some antique furniture.

=== Operational ===
Some of the operational steam locomotives are the two German-built, Esslingen B25 classes 0-4-2RT B25 02 and B25 03 (ex-NIS 232 and 233), which are from the original fleet of 5 supplied to the line more than 100 years ago (a third locomotive, the B25 01 (ex-NIS 231) is preserved as static display at a park in the town nearby). The 0-10-0RT E10 class, PNKA E10 60, which was originally locale to West Sumatra in the 1960s for coal transports, was brought to Java for repair and later returned again as excursion train at Sawahlunto, and a Mogul Hartmann 2-6-0T C1218 (ex-SS 457) which was restored to working order in 2006, but transferred to Solo to working as excursion train as the request of Surakarta city government, named Sepur Kluthuk Jaladara. The museum also have a small diesel switcher D300 class 0-8-0D D300 23, previously based at Cepu, an old UH-295 crane from Semarang, and the restored Hanomag 4-4-0 two-cylinder compound DKA B51 12 (ex-SS Class 612) worked for excursion train on Ambarawa–Tuntang line.

Class	Unit number	Image	Axles	Builder	Builder no.	Year built	Remarks
B25	02		0-4-2RT	(German Empire) Maschinenfabrik Esslingen	3243	1902	Withdrawn from service in 2020.
B25	03		0-4-2RT	(German Empire) Maschinenfabrik Esslingen	3244	1902	
B51	12		4-4-0	(German Empire) Hanomag	3866	1902	
D300	23		0-8-0DH	(West Germany) Krupp	3719	1958	Withdrawn from service in 2018.
D301	24		0-8-0DH	(West Germany) Krupp	4171	1962	

=== Static display ===
Reference
Disclaimer: Photos shown below may not represent the current condition or layout.

Class	Unit number	Image	Axles	Builder	Builder no.	Year built	Remarks
B20	14		0-4-0Tr	(United Kingdom) Beyer, Peacock and Company	4634	1905	
B22	20		0-4-2T	(German Empire) Sächsische Maschinenfabrik	2568	1900	
B27	11		0-4-2T	(German Empire) Sächsische Maschinenfabrik	3757	1914	
B52	10		0-4-0	(German Empire) Sächsische Maschinenfabrik	3484	1911	
C11	40		2-6-0T	(German Empire) Sächsische Maschinenfabrik	1759	1891	
C12	40		2-6-0T	(German Empire) Sächsische Maschinenfabrik	2736	1902	
C15	07		0-6-0T	(Netherlands) Werkspoor	17	1900	
C16	03		0-6-0T	(German Empire) Sächsische Maschinenfabrik	2718	1901	
C17	04		0-6-0T	(German Empire) Sächsische Maschinenfabrik	2773	1902	
C18	01		0-6-0T	(German Empire) Sächsische Maschinenfabrik	3160	1908	
C20	01		0-6-2T	(German Empire) Sächsische Maschinenfabrik	2792	1902	
C24	07		2-6-2T	(Netherlands) Werkspoor	216	1908	
C27	28		4-6-4T	(Netherlands) Werkspoor	472	1920	
C28	21		4-6-4T	(Weimar Republic) Henschel & Son	18175	1921	
C51	01		4-6-0	(United Kingdom) Beyer, Peacock and Company	5593	1912	
C54	17		4-6-0	(United Kingdom) Beyer, Peacock and Company	6122	1922	
D10	07		0-8-0T	(German Empire) Sächsische Maschinenfabrik	3804	1914	
D51	06		2-8-2	(Weimar Republic) Sächsische Maschinenfabrik	4135	1920	
F10	02		2-12-2T	(German Empire) Hanomag	6814	1913	
BB10	12		0-4-4-2T	(German Empire) Sächsische Maschinenfabrik	3902	1906	
CC50	29		2-6-6-0	(Switzerland) Swiss Locomotive and Machine Works	3253	1928	
BB200	08		A1A-A1A	(United States) EMD	22434	1957	Stored at Tuntang station.
CC200	15		Co-2-Co	(United States) GE–ALCO	31918	1953	
DD55	12		B-B	(Japan) Fuji Heavy Industries	n/a	1974	Stored at Tuntang station.

== Gallery ==
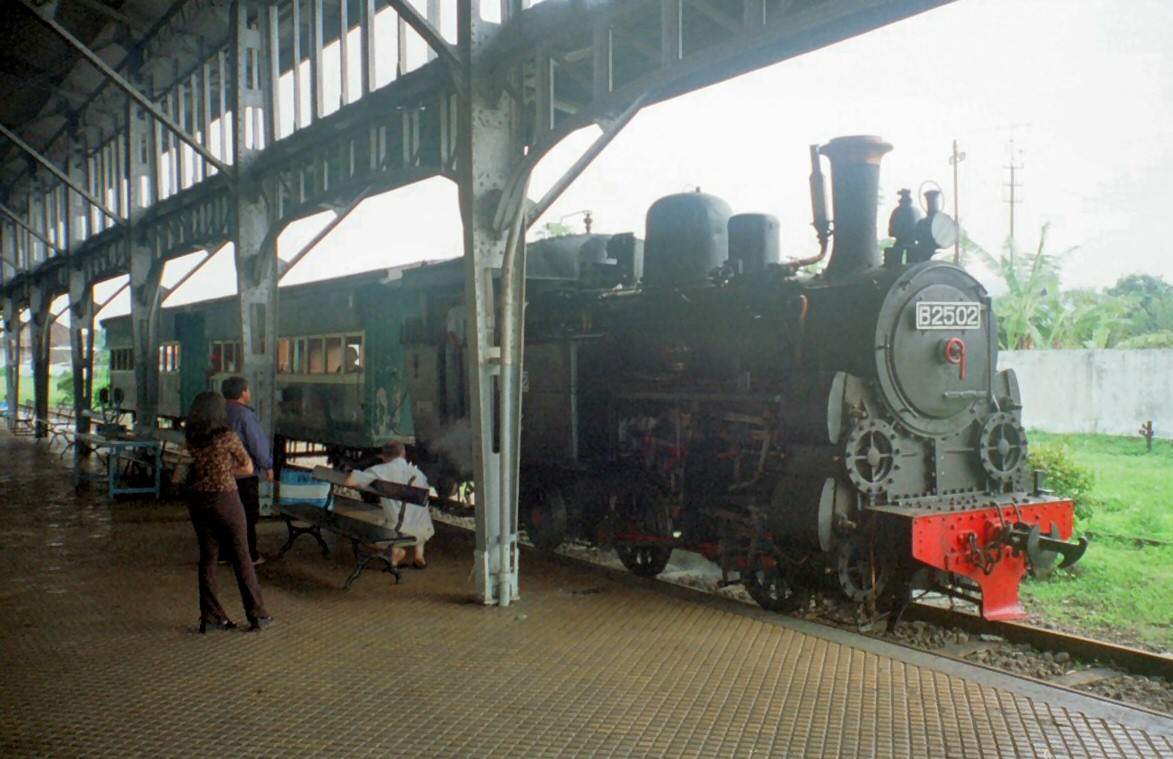
B25 02 (ex-NIS Class 232), one of the three locomotives that are still active.

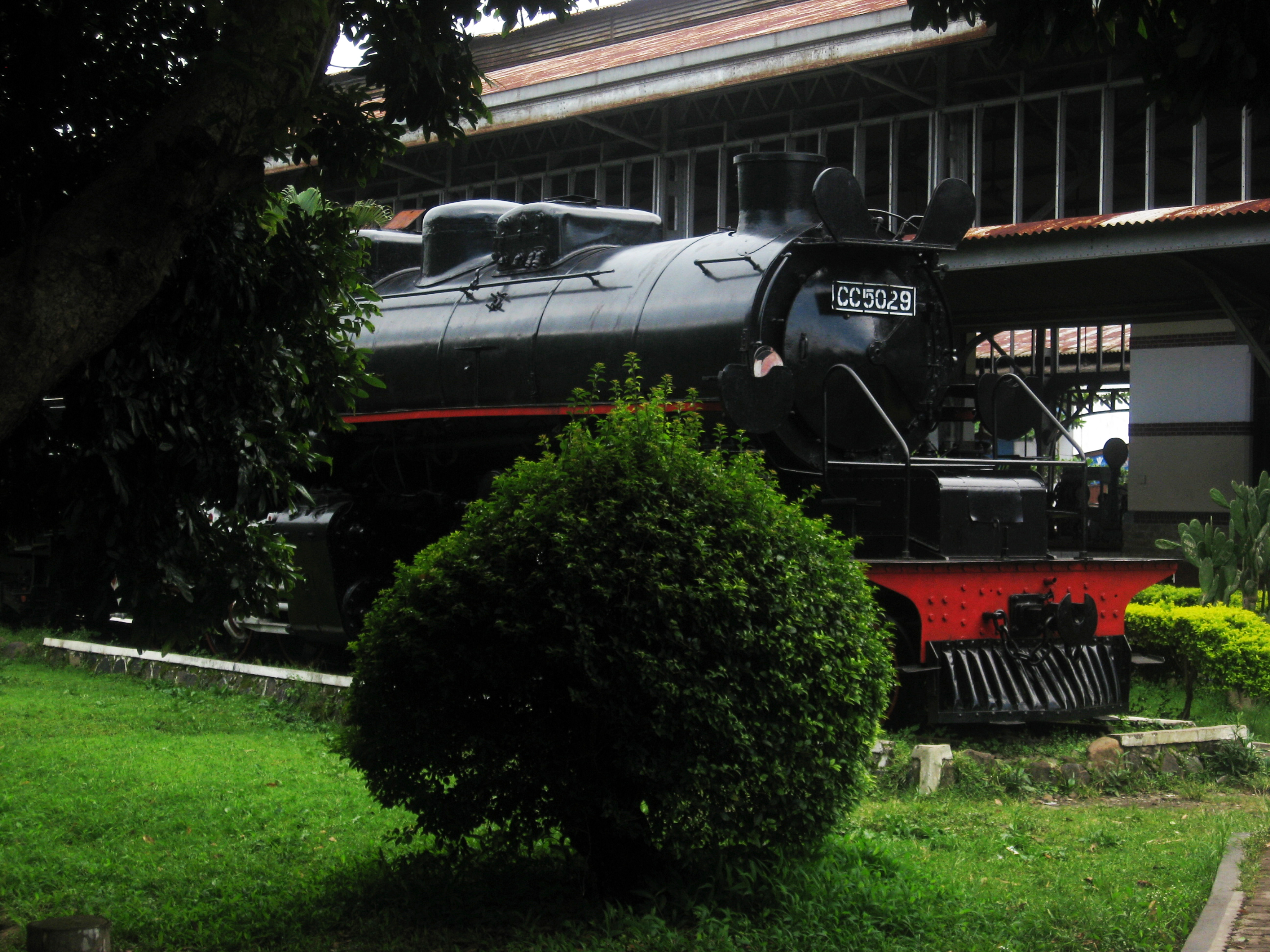
CC5029 (ex-SS1629), one of the 2-6-6-0 "Denver" type mallet locomotive which preserved as static display, during colonial time it also known as Bergkoningin (Queen of the Mountains), because it was used in the mountainous line in West Java. Later it was known as Si Gombar (The Monster) due to its huge size.

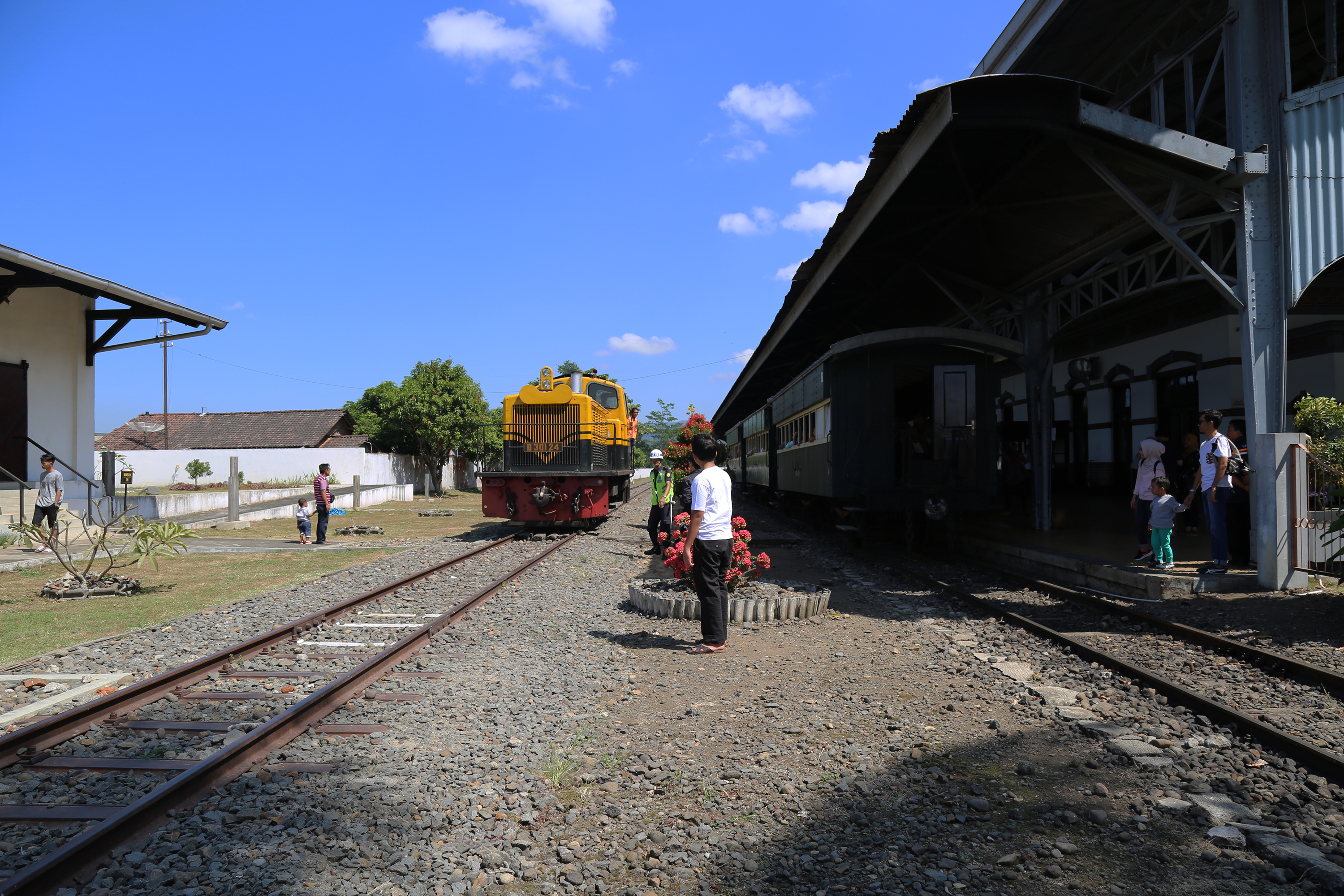
Krupp Diesel hydraulic D301 24 was shunting at Ambarawa station

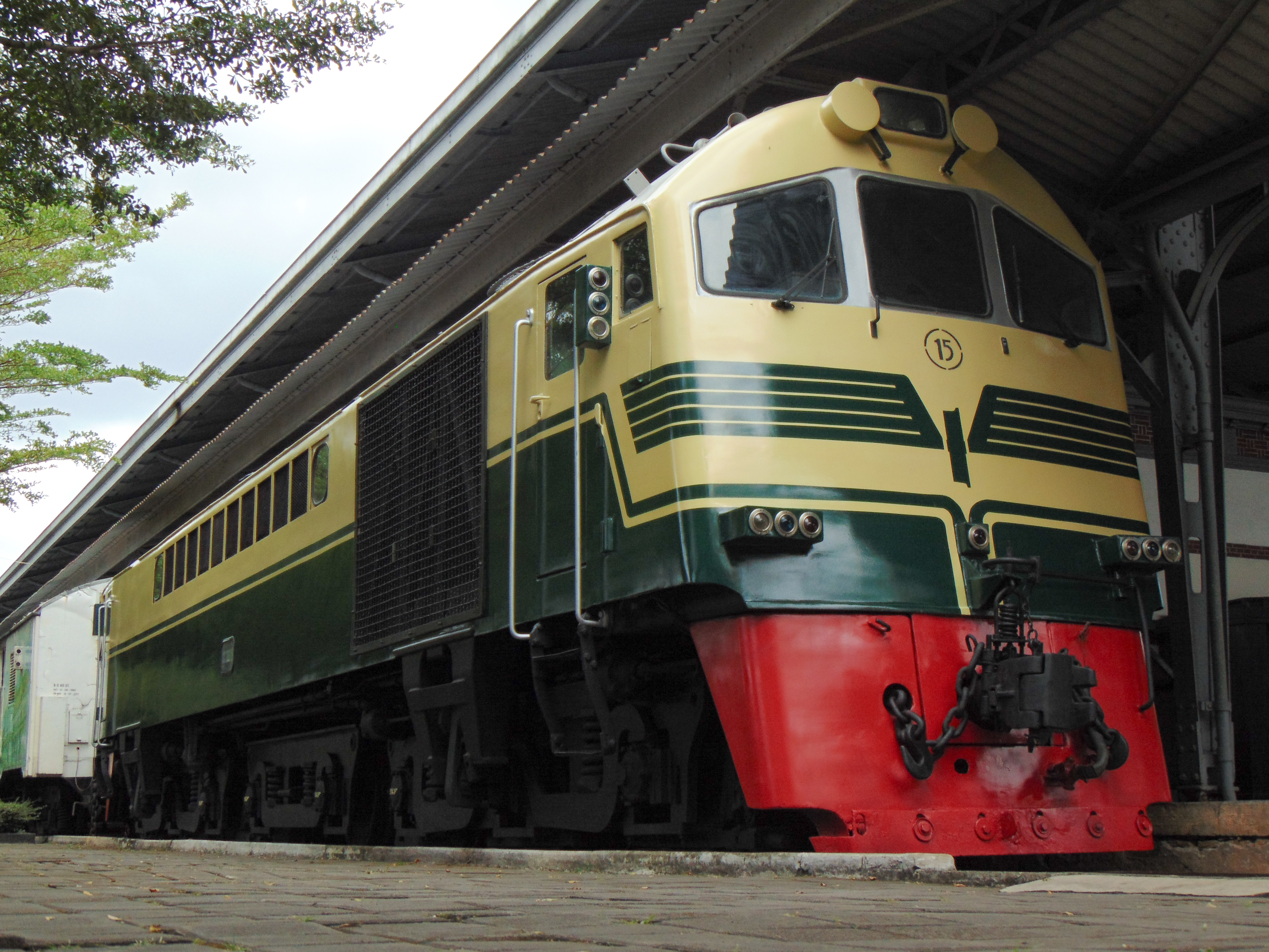
A General Electric diesel electric CC 200 15 as the first generation of diesel–electric engine preserved by Indonesian Railway Preservation Society (IRPS) at Ambarawa.

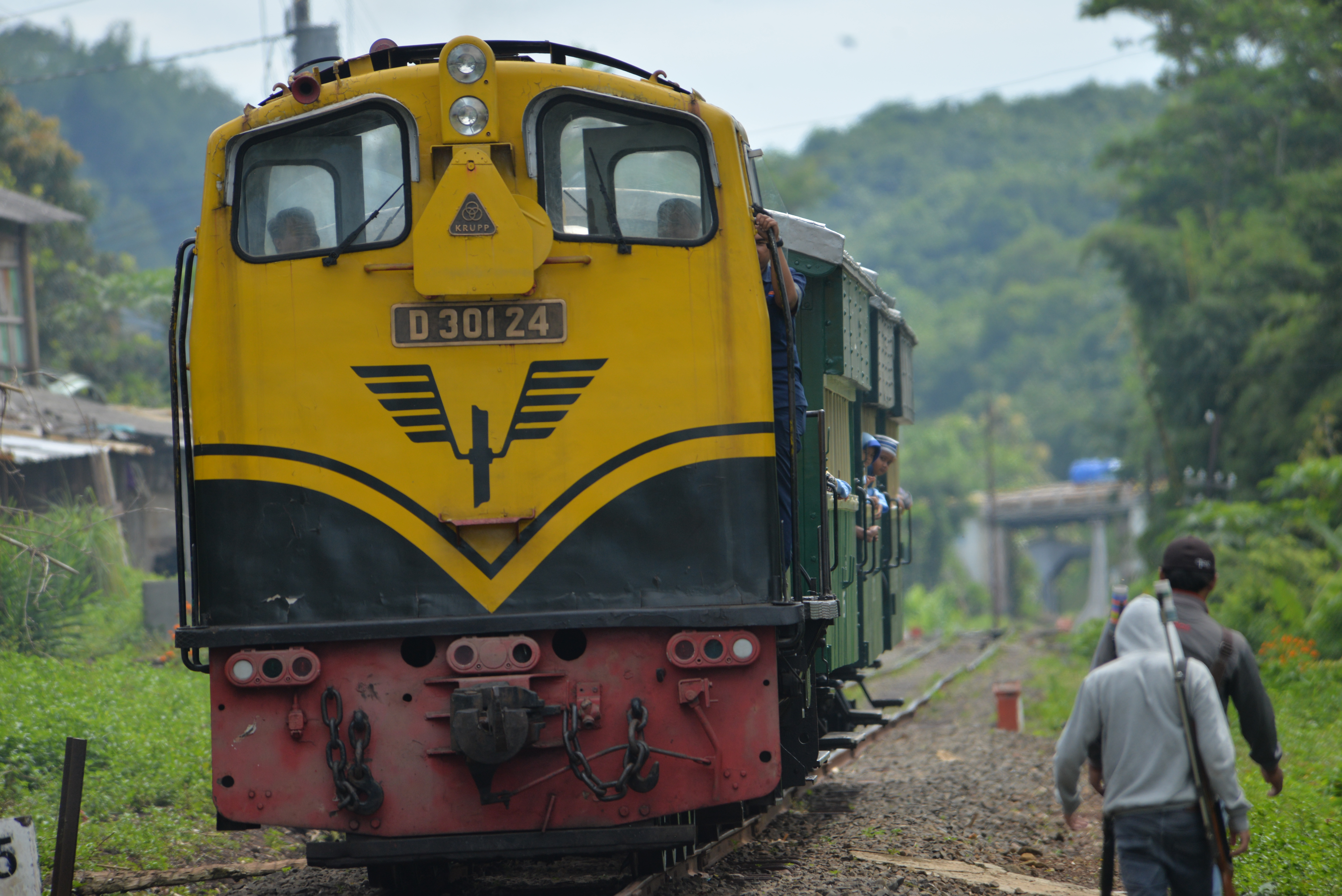
Tourist train with Locomotive D301

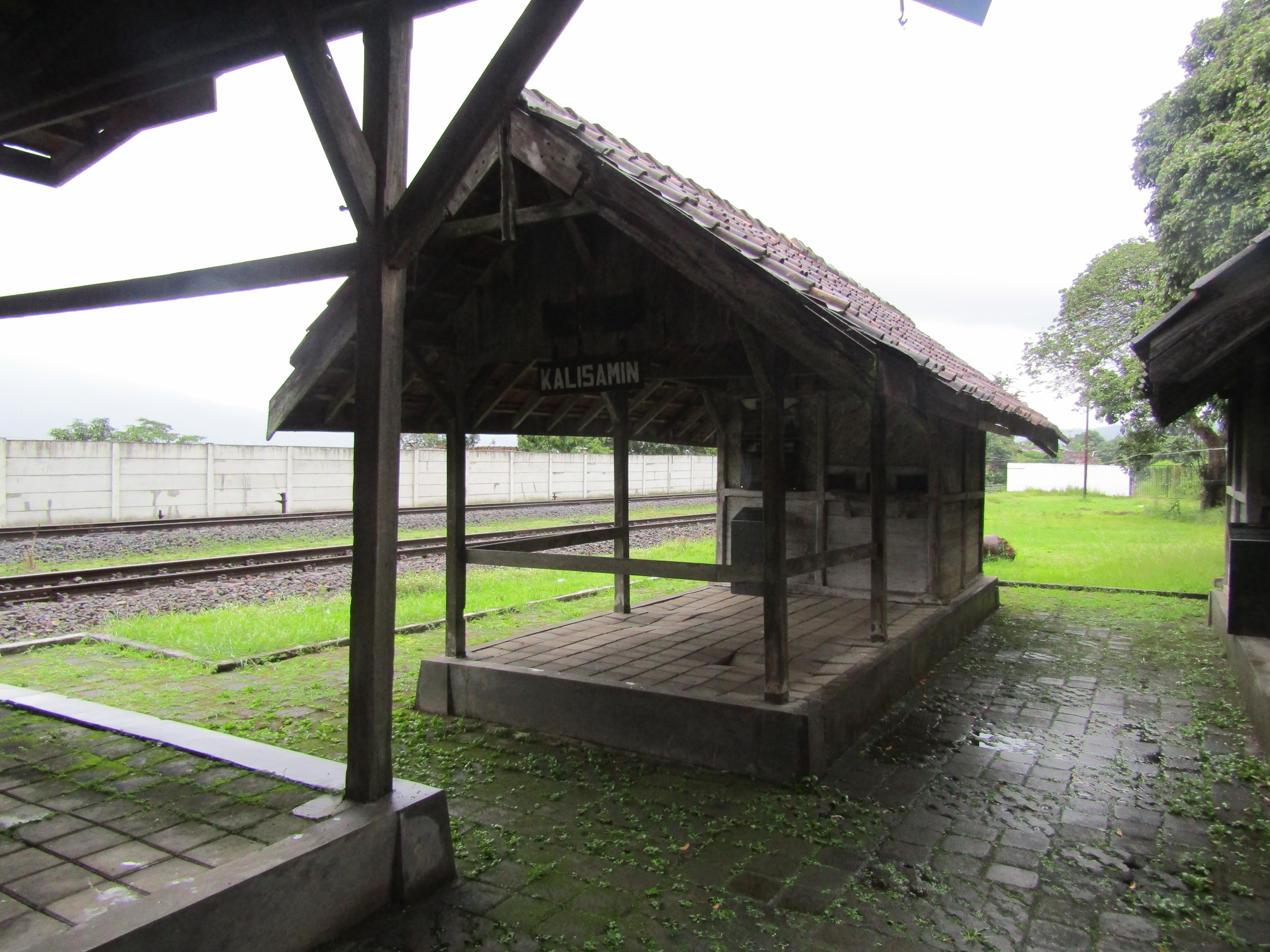
Former Halte Kalisamin building at Ambarawa

== See also ==
- List of museums and cultural institutions in Indonesia
- Bondowoso Rail and Train Museum

== Literature ==
- Lenzi, Iola (2004). Museums of Southeast Asia. Singapore: Archipelago Press. p. 200. ISBN 981-4068-96-9.

Preceding station	Kereta Api Indonesia	Following station
Tuntang towards Kedungjati	Kedungjati–Secang	Jambu towards ~~Secang~~
