= Kedungjati railway station =

Railway station in Indonesia

Kedungjati Station Stasiun Kedungjati
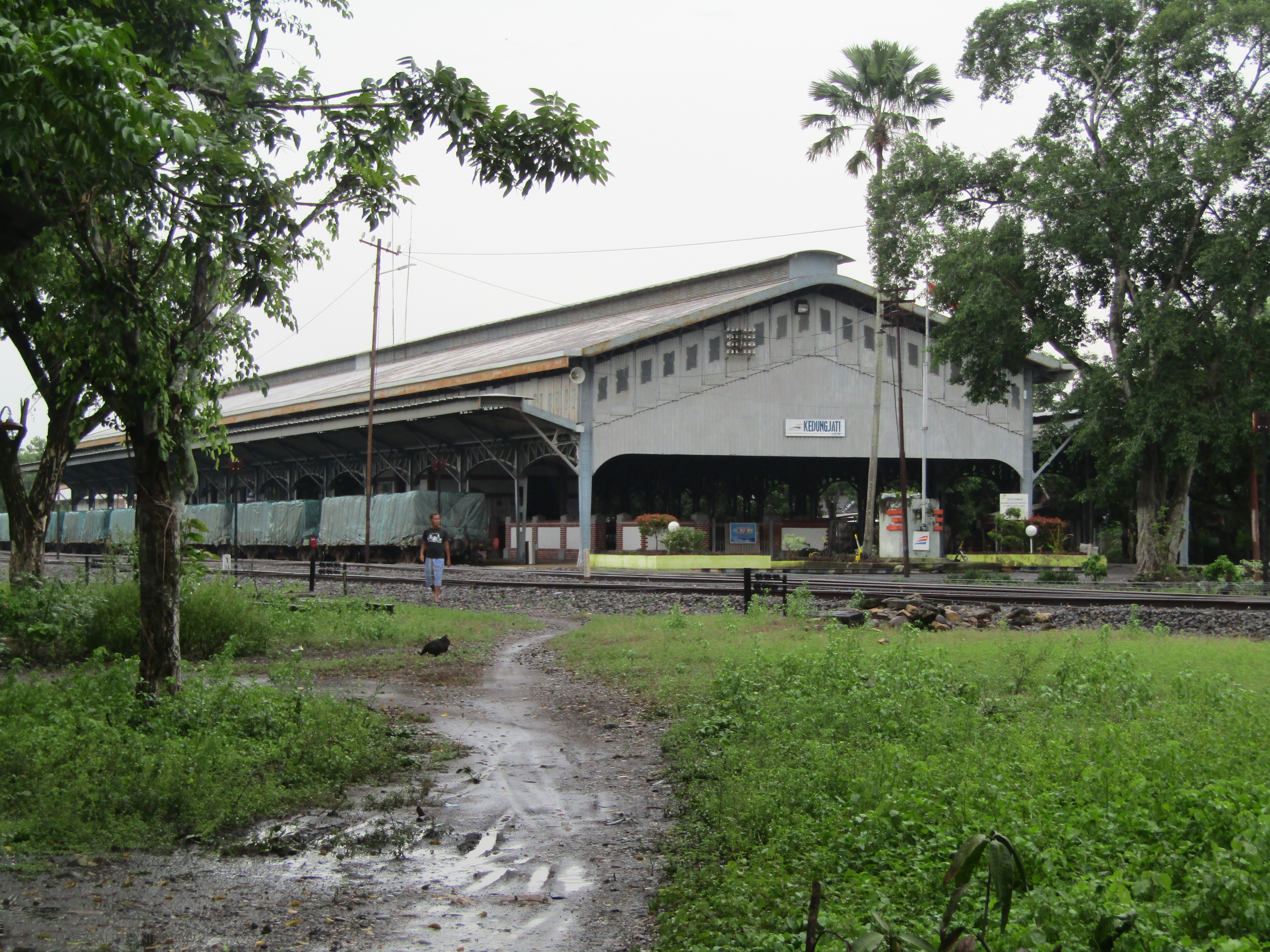
- Kedungjati Station in 2019

General information
- Location: Kedungjati, Kedungjati, Grobogan Regency, Central Java, Indonesia
- Coordinates: 7.163687°S 110.6356019°E
- Elevation: +36m
- Owner: Kereta Api Indonesia
- Manager: Kereta Api Indonesia
- Lines: Brumbung–Gundih; Kedungjati–Secang (closed)
- Platforms: 1 side platform 3 island platforms
- Tracks: 3

Construction
- Parking: Available

Other information
- Station code: KEJ • 3201
- Classification: Class III

History
- Opened: 19 July 1868
- Original company: Nederlandsch-Indische Spoorweg Maatschappij
Location
- Location within Java

Kedungjati Station (KEJ) is a class III railway station located in Kedungjati District, Grobogan Regency, Central Java, Indonesia. The station is located at an altitude of +36 meters and is operated by Operation Area IV Semarang. The station once had a junction to Ambarawa Station until it was closed in 1976.

== History ==
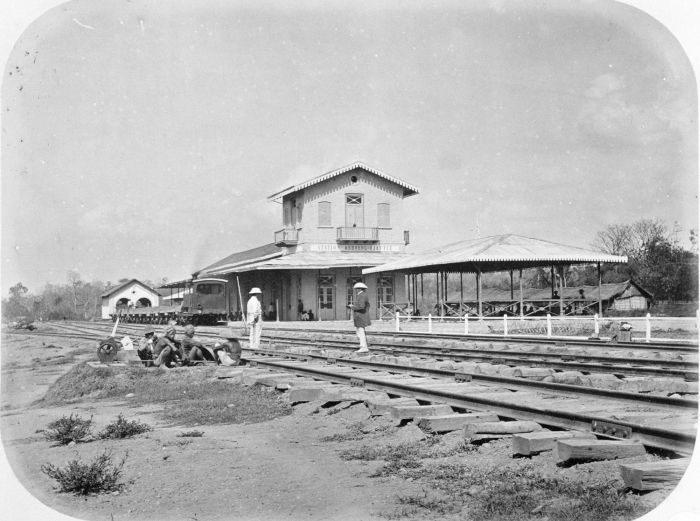
Kedungjati Station c. 1870s

The station was built and owned by the Nederlandsch-Indische Spoorweg Maatschappij (NIS) and was opened on 19 July 1868. NIS was planning to build two railway lines from Semarang, with one going to the Vorstenlanden and the other one to the military town of Ambarawa. The Kedungjati–Gundih–Solo segment of the Vorstenlanden line was operational on 1 September 1869, with the line was officially opened on 10 February 1870. The line to Ambarawa was opened on 21 May 1873.

In 1907, the wooden station building was dismantled and replaced with the new brick stucco structure.

The line to Ambarawa was inactive beginning on 1 June 1970 and it was officially closed in 1976. The line was completely severed from Kedungjati Station when a bridge in the line collapsed in 1978. The Kedungjati–Tuntang segment of the line was planned to be reactivated, with the reconstruction started in 2014. The reconstruction work was halted in 2015 and as of 2021 it is yet to be resumed.

== Building and layout ==
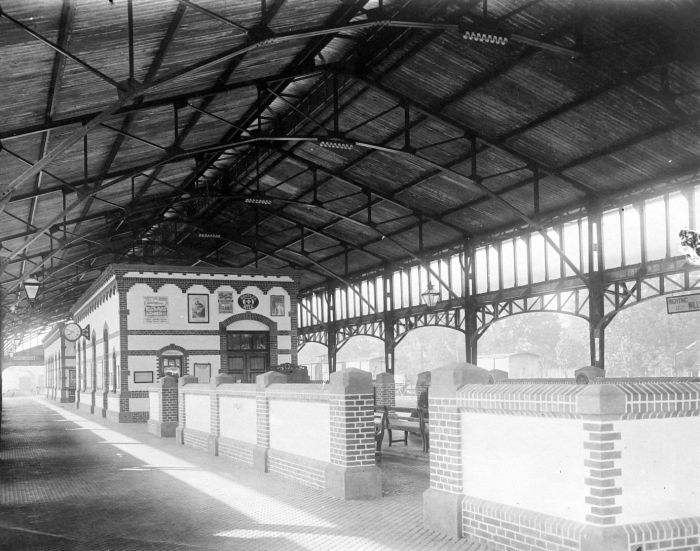
The station building c. 1910–1920

When the station was opened in 1868, it had wooden structure. In 1907 it was replaced with brick stucco building and 14.65 meters steel platform canopy with corrugated zinc roof tiles. The 1907 building architecture is similar to the Ambarawa and Purwosari stations.

Kedungjati Station is an island station and has one side platform and three island platforms. The station has three active lines and two disused lines with line 2 being the straight line. The active lines in the northern side is used for serving trains in Semarang–Surakarta lines, while the two disused lines are located in the southern side and was used to serve the trains to Ambarawa and Magelang until the line was closed in 1976. The rail tracks in the southern lines was refurbished in 2014 in preparation for reactivation.

The station used to have a locomotive shed and turntable, but it was dismantled and plundered by looters in the aftermath of the 1997 Asian financial crisis.

== Services ==
- Executive-Economy class
  - Joglosemarkerto from Solo Balapan to Semarang Tawang via Yogyakarta–Purwokerto–Tegal loop line and vice versa.
  - Joglosemarkerto from Purwokerto to Solo Balapan via Tegal and Semarang Tawang.

Preceding station	Kereta Api Indonesia	Following station
Tanggung towards Brumbung	Brumbung–Gundih	Padas towards Gundih
Terminus	Kedungjati–Secang (Closed)	~~Tempuran~~ towards ~~Secang~~
