= Trans-Sulawesi Railway =

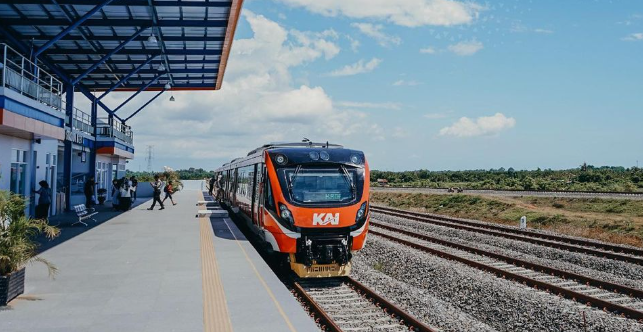
- BPKASS KAI KRDE Sulsel at Maros Station

Overview
- Native name: Jalur kereta api Trans-Sulawesi
- Status: Partly operational, mostly under construction
- Owner: Directorate General of Railways, Ministry of Transportation of Republic of Indonesia
- Locale: Sulawesi, Indonesia
- Termini: Makassar; Manado

Service
- Type: Heavy rail
- Services: Makassar–Parepare, Parepare–Mamuju, Makassar–Bulukumba–Watampone, Manado–Bitung, and Bitung–Gorontalo (first phase)
- Operator(s): Consortium of Kereta Api Indonesia Surabaya branch and a South Sulawesi provincially-owned company

Technical
- Track length: 917 km (570 mi) (first phase)
- Track gauge: 1,435 mm (4 ft 8 1/2 in) standard gauge
- Operating speed: 80 km/h (50 mph); 110 km/h (68 mph) (top speed); 180–200 km/h (110–120 mph) (planned)

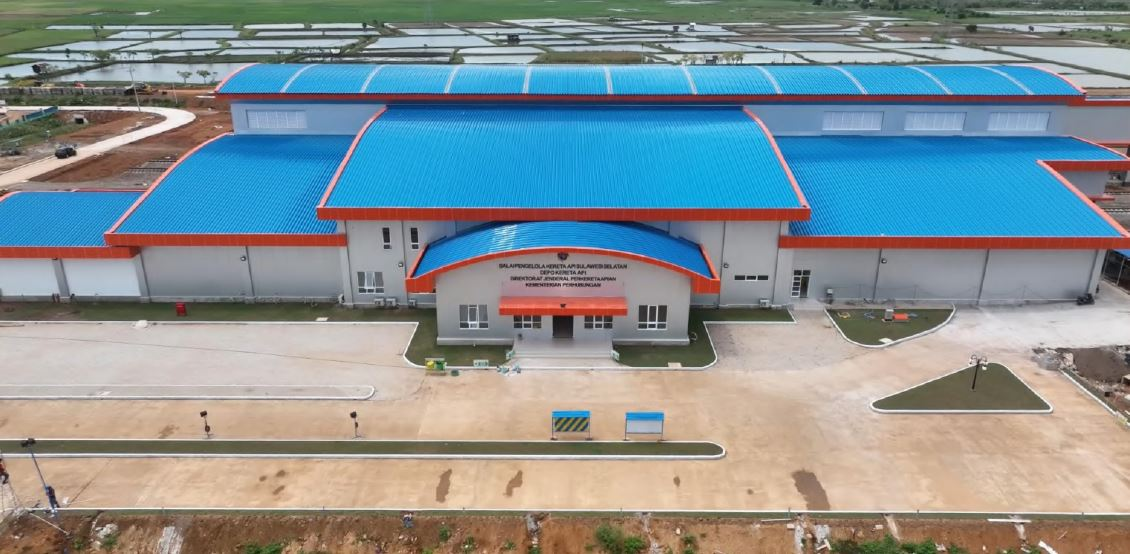
Maros locomotive depot in Maros Regency

The Trans-Sulawesi Railway (Indonesian: Jalur kereta api Trans-Sulawesi), is a railway network in the Indonesian island of Sulawesi. The first phase, the 146 kilometers route from Makassar to Parepare, was completed in November 2022 . The total plan for the railway would be around 2,000 kilometres (1,200 mi) spanning from Makassar to Manado. Most of other sections are still under construction.

The Trans-Sulawesi Railway are built with 1,435 mm (4 ft 8 1/2 in) standard gauge which is wider than the 1,067 mm (3 ft 6 in) cape gauge used in Java and Sumatra to accommodate more weight and speed.

== Routes ==
=== Makassar–Parepare ===
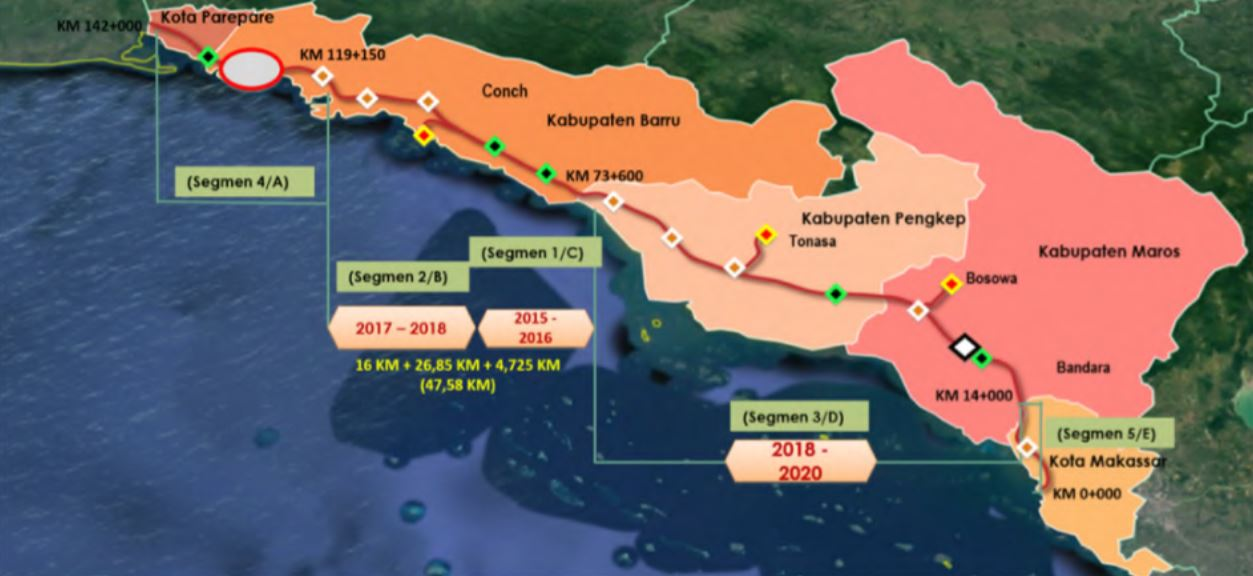
Makassar-Parepare railway map (in Indonesian)

The ground breaking of Makassar–Parepare route was conducted on 18 August 2014 in, Siawung Village, Barru District, Barru Regency. On early November 2022, 66 kilometres (41 mi) of railway from Barru to Pangkep was inaugurated and operational. As of 2022, it is the only operational part of the railway.
