= Kereta Api Indonesia =

Major operator of public railways in Indonesia

PT Kereta Api Indonesia (Persero)
- Kereta Api Indonesia's logo used since September 2020

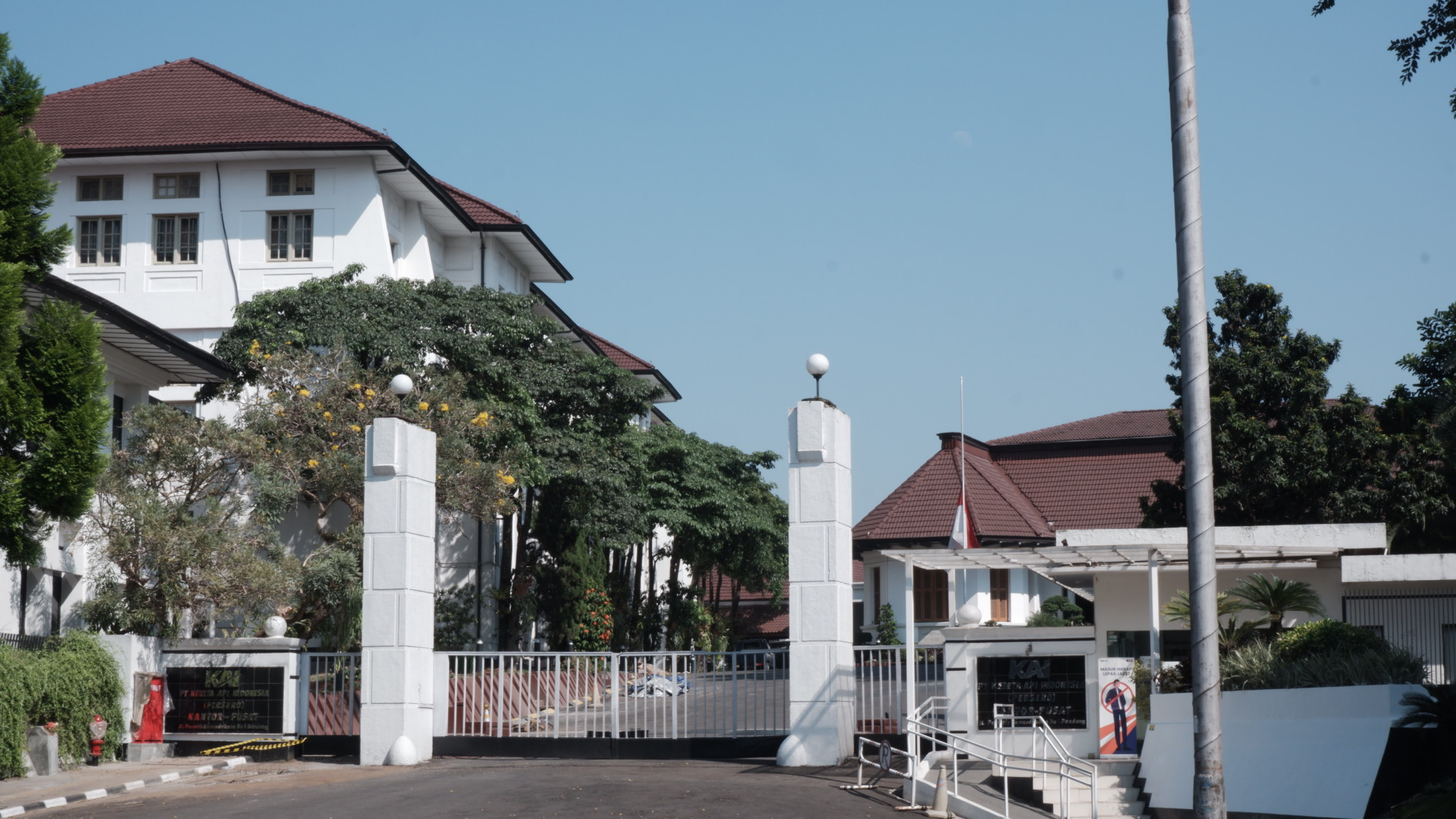
- Headquarters complex in Bandung, inherited from the Netherlands-Indies State Railways
- Trade name: KAI
- Formerly: Indonesian State Railways (DKARI/DKA/PNKA/PJKA) (1945–1990); Indonesian Railway Public Corporation (Perumka) (1990–1995)
- Type: State-owned (PT)
- Traded as: IDX: KAII (bonds)
- Headquarters: Bandung, West Java, Indonesia
- Key people: Said Aqil Siradj (chairman of the advisory board); Bobby Rasyidin (CEO)
- Revenue: ▲ Rp 35.9 trillion (2024)
- Net income: ▲ Rp 2.20 trillion (2024)
- Total assets: ▲ Rp 102.4 trillion (2025)
- Owner: Government of Indonesia
- Number of employees: 29,707 (2024)
- Parent: Danantara Asset Management
- Subsidiaries: KAI Commuter; KAI Bandara; KAI Logistik; KAI Wisata; KAI Properti; KAI Services; Pilar Sinergi BUMN Indonesia
- Website: www.kai.id

Kereta Api Indonesia

- Mutiara Timur train crossing Ngagel to Surabaya Gubeng railway station

Overview
- Fleet: List: 420 locomotives; 578 electric multiple units (by KCI); 121 diesel multiple units; 1,607 passenger coaches; 6,782 freight cars
- Headquarters: Bandung, West Java
- Locale: Java, Sumatra (Aceh, North Sumatra, West Sumatra, South Sumatra, and Lampung), Sulawesi (South Sulawesi)
- Dates of operation: 1945–present
- Predecessor: See: List of railway companies in the Dutch East Indies

Technical
- Track gauge: 1,067 mm (3 ft 6 in) (Most of railway lines); 1,435 mm (4 ft 8 1/2 in) (Aceh, Sulawesi, LRT Jabodebek)
- Previous gauge: 750 mm (2 ft 5 1/2 in) (Aceh tramway gauge); 600 mm (1 ft 11 5/8 in) (tramway gauge)
- Electrification: 1500 V DC overhead wiring for KCI operation; 750 V DC third rail for Palembang LRT, and Jabodebek LRT operation; 25 kV 50 Hz AC overhead line for KCIC
- Length: 6,945 kilometres (4,315 mi)
- Highest elevation: 1,246 m (4,088 ft) (Cikajang railway station)

PT Kereta Api Indonesia (Persero) (lit. 'Indonesian Railways (State-owned) Limited', KAI) is the main state-owned railway operator of Indonesia. KAI provides intercity passenger services directly, while its subsidiaries provide commuter rail services (KAI Commuter), airport link services (KAI Bandara), freight rail services (KAI Logistik), as well as infrastructure maintenance (KAI Services). KAI also operates in other sectors, such as properties management (KAI Properti) and tourism (KAI Wisata). KAI also has indirect control of Whoosh through its ownership of a majority of shares in PT Pilar Sinergi BUMN Indonesia (PSBI), another state-owned enterprise of Indonesia.

KAI operates on the islands of Sumatra, Java, and Sulawesi, with a total of 6,945 kilometres (4,315 mi) of tracks. Also holds track-assets and planned services on Madura Island. In 2024, KAI carried 505 million passengers and 73.5 million tonnes of cargo, earning Rp 36.1 trillion in revenue.

== History ==
Kereta Api Indonesia originates from a long line of successive state railway companies dating from the Dutch colonial days. On 27 August 1863, Indonesia's first railway company was named Nederlandsch-Indische Spoorweg Maatschappij (NIS). The colonial government of the Dutch East Indies granted concession to W. Poolman, Alex Frazer and E.H. Kol on 28 August 1862. Its initial route was from Samarang to Tanggung (Grobogan). The line was inaugurated in Kemijen village, Semarang, by L.A.J.W. Baron Sloet van de Beele on 17 June 1864. The first lines, Batavia (Jakarta)–Buitenzorg (Bogor) and Samarang–Vorstenlanden opened on 10 August 1867. They suffered big losses and bankruptcy. The colonial government assisted the company by forming the Staatsspoorwegen, a state-owned company on 6 April 1875. Their route stretched from Buitenzorg (now Bogor) to Soerabaja (Surabaya). The private company Deli Spoorweg Maatschappij operated exclusively in North Sumatra, to transport rubber and tobacco around the Deli area.

In 1939, the total operational trackage was 4,588 km (2,851 mi) (it is unclear whether dual-gauge tracks were counted once or twice).

Following Indonesian independence in 1945 and Dutch recognition of its sovereignty in 1949, the various railway systems (except the Deli Railway Company) were combined into the Djawatan Kereta Api Republik Indonesia (DKARI, lit. Railways Service of the Republic of Indonesia) in 1953. The company traces its origins to 28 September 1945, which is marked today as the official birthday of the rail network. The DKARI network received its first diesel locomotives in 1952. These diesel locomotives slowly dominated the railway lines, first in Java and then in Sumatra, for the next two decades. Non-state railway systems nationwide retained their formal existence until 1958, when all the railway lines were nationalised under DKARI, including the Deli in North Sumatra.

The network was finally corporatised with the foundation of its successor Perusahaan Negara Kereta Api (PNKA, lit. National Railway Corporation of Indonesia) on 28 September 1963, its 18th anniversary, as part of the official celebrations held for the 1963-67 Railways Centennial. These celebrations also saw a renewed investment in the railway network's fleet and the arrival of new locomotives. On 28 September 1970, PNKA was rebranded as Perusahaan Jawatan Kereta Api (PJKA, lit. Indonesian Railway Service Corporation LLC), which saw widespread dieselisation of the network and the slow retirement of its remaining steam powered assets, a process which lasted until the mid-1980s, ending a long era of steam service in the nation.

Much of the branch lines constructed in the colonial era were dismantled or abandoned in the 1980s.

On 1 August 1990, PJKA was renamed once more to Perusahaan Umum Kereta Api (Perumka, lit. Indonesian Railways Public Corporation LLC), with an updated logo. Law No. 13 of 1992 stated that the government operates railways, delegates operations to an operating body (then the Perumka, now PT KAI) and provides and maintains railway infrastructure. Private companies were allowed to co-operate in railway operation work.

On 1 June 1999, Perumka was converted into a joint-stock company, PT Kereta Api (Persero) (PT KA, lit. Indonesian Railways Company Ltd JSC). In May 2010, the branding was amended to become PT Kereta Api Indonesia (Persero) (PT KAI).

Electric locomotives were always a minority, and no new electric locomotives were acquired until the 1970s. However, electric multiple units have been imported since 1976 for the Jabotabek commuter urban transport service, which was spun off from KAI in August 2008.

After upgrading the rail between Purwosari station and Wonogiri station and the bridges to R42 rail, the line between Sangkrah station, Solo and Wonogiri switched to being served by heavy electric diesel locomotives.

KAI logo used from 28 September 2011 until 28 September 2020 (still seen in some locations)

On 3 May 2011, the company conducted a cargo train trial from Cikarang Dry Port to Surabaya. In December, a memorandum of understanding was signed between KAI and Bombardier Transportation. The project would have established final assembly of diesel-electric TRAXX Asia Locomotives in Surabaya, East Java for export and domestic use. The plant and project appear to have been abandoned as no TRAXX plant has been built in Surabaya.

In 2012, KAI and GE Transportation signed a Memorandum of Understanding to cooperate on train services, in particular assistance with traction motor remanufacturing. In the same year, Indonesian Railways allocated Rp20 billion (US$2.2 million) to restore and renovate 20 heritage sites and historical railways on Java and Sumatra.

727 kilometres (452 mi) of the Jakarta-Surabaya line were double tracked in May 2014, followed by the completion of a 1,000-kilometre (620 mi) double tracking project on the south coast in 2015. On 8 June 2015, the Duri-Tangerang double track project was inaugurated for KA Commuter Jabodetabek, but it could also be used for airport trains. Construction began in early 2015 to connect Cikarang Dry Port and Tanjung Priok Port to ease traffic.

The first trackage project of the Trans-Sulawesi Railway from Makassar to Pare-pare, with a length of 143 km (89 mi), was completed in 2017. The train began service in 2018 with wider trackage than in Java to accommodate more weight and speed.

== Assets ==
Revaluation of assets was conducted by the Ministry of Transportation. The company owned Rp35 trillion (US$4.1billion) in land assets and Rp22 trillion (US$2.6 billion) in other assets (bridges, signals, etc.). The exact value was expected to be determined by the end of 2011 or 2012, based on an audit by the Ministry of Finance.

=== Trackage ===
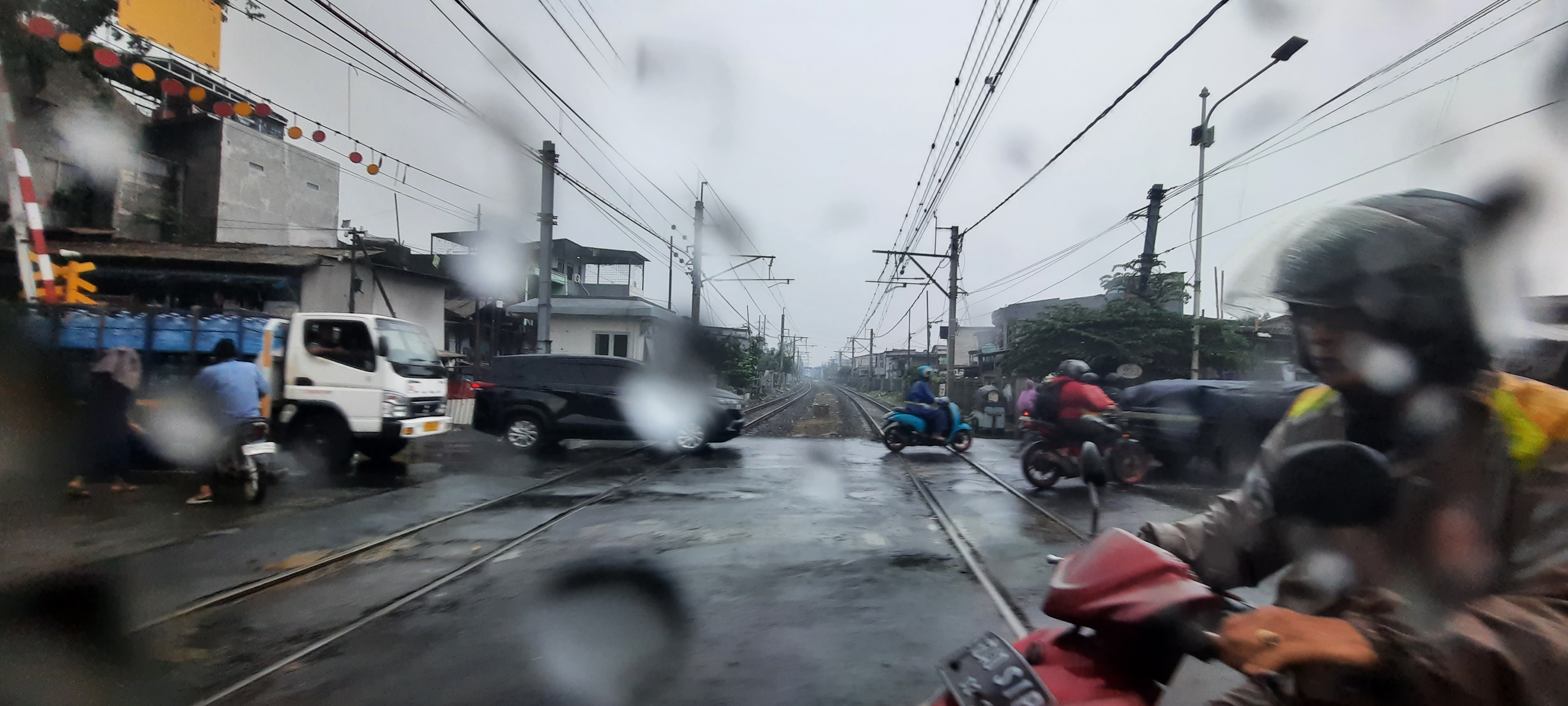
Duri–Tangerang railway with 1,067 mm cape gauge

The company operates 1,067 mm (3 ft 6 in) cape gauge and 1,435 mm (4 ft 8 1/2 in) standard gauge lines. The 1,067 mm gauge is the most common, used in Java and the majority of Sumatra, while the 1,435 mm gauge is used only in Aceh, the Trans-Sulawesi Railway, and Jabodebek LRT. The company previously operated 750 mm (2 ft 5 1/2 in) gauge lines in Aceh and 600 mm (1 ft 11 5/8 in) gauge lines for some tramway lines.

The total trackage laid in Indonesia was 7,583 kilometres (4,712 mi), although not all lines were in operation at the same time. The system spanned 6,945 km (4,315 mi) as of 2025, with the Aceh system, most of the West Sumatra system and most former steam tram lines abandoned, but including new tracks built alongside old tracks (double tracking projects).

A memorandum of understanding was signed in 2010 to build 565 km (351 miles) of railway around Bali, which was expected to be completed in 2015.

The Kedungjati–Tuntang railway line is a part of the planned reactivation of the Semarang–Ambarawa line and is to be the only railway in Indonesia without road crossings. It was planned to include eight flyovers and underpasses to improve safety in congested roads.

=== Rolling stock ===
Gumarang Train with white and blue pattern GE-C18MMi (CC204) locomotive.

As of 2024, KAI operated:

- 462 locomotive units;
- 1020 electric multiple units carriages;
- 90 diesel multiple units sets;
- 1,532 passenger coaches; and
- 7,690 freight cars

The company is a major customer of the local railway equipment industry, PT Industri Kereta Api, which produces its passenger coaches, freight wagons and electric multiple units.

==== Locomotives ====
KAI's diesel-electric locomotives are mostly made in the United States or Canada, diesel hydraulic locomotives are mostly made in Germany, and electric units are mostly made in Japan. AIC assembles diesel-electric TRAXX Asia Locomotives in Surabaya, East Java, in cooperation with Bombardier Transportation (now Alstom).

All locomotives of the KAI (with the exception of steam locomotives) are diesel-powered. Most new locomotives use diesel-electric transmission, while shunters and older locomotives have hydraulic transmission. More than 400 locomotives are documented, but the number of operational locomotives is smaller.

Locomotives are required by regulation to use a combination of letters and numbers for designations. A letter or a combination of letters denotes the wheel arrangement (currently there are C, D, BB, and CC types), and a three-digit number indicates the class (2xx for classes with electric transmission and 3xx for classes with hydraulic or mechanical transmission), starting from 0. A two-digit number represents the year of operations, and two- or three-digit after the year indicates the running number.

The steam locomotive classification was directly derived from the Japanese 1928 numbering system (which was adopted by the wartime Japanese occupation authorities). Tank locomotives were numbered from the 10s, while tender locomotives were numbered from the 50s. Letter combinations were used for Mallet locomotives.

==== Named passenger trains ====
KAI Limited runs six classes of coaches in its various named passenger trains in Java and Sumatra, namely the Luxury/Imperial (first class), Executive (first class), Business (second class), Priority (tourist/first to second class), Economy Premium (second class) and Economy (third class) classes.

Alongside regular coaches, KAI operates a number of generator, baggage/parcels and dining cars which also compose these trainsets.

==== Exclusive carriages ====
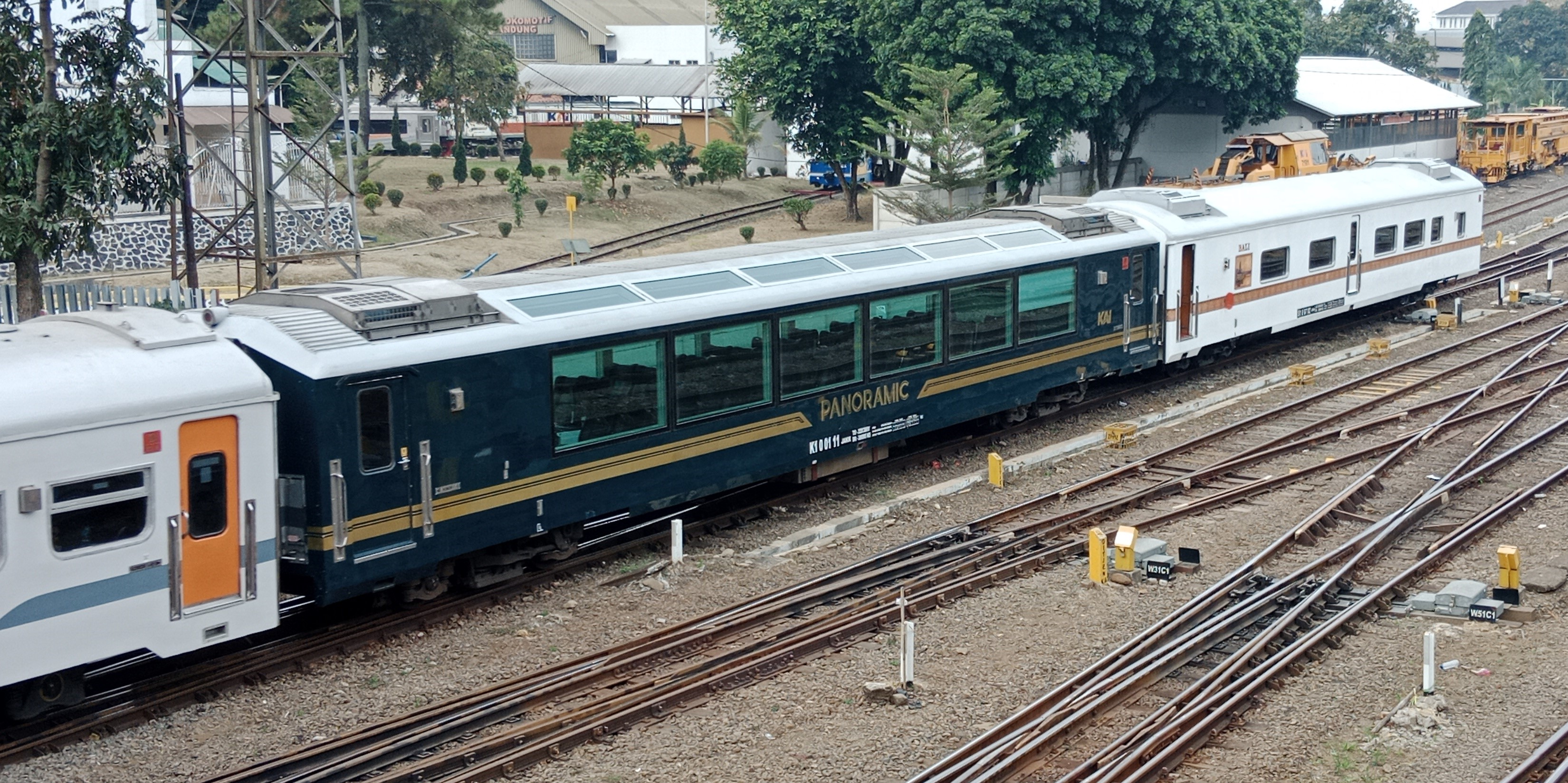
A Panoramic car and "Bali'" tourist car attached to a regular train

The kereta wisata (lit. "tourist carriage") is a luxury class passenger car that can be rented and attached to a regular trainset for a specific journey. The main users of these exclusive carriages are government officials, corporate boards, extended families, and groups of artists or tourists. The rental fee is about Rp 15,000,000 for short trips such as Jakarta–Bandung or Jakarta–Cirebon and up to Rp 27,000,000 for long distance Jakarta–Surabaya trips. These carriages can accommodate up to 22 passengers, or 19 passengers for "Nusantara" tourist/observation cars with a large bedroom for two. Snacks, meals, and drinks are provided free of charge in these carriages. Since the 2020s, alongside these cars, KAI has debuted tourist versions of its long distance day trains for both local and international tourists. These trains have a capacity of 20 passengers on the "Imperial" class open coach/bar cars and "Retro" class lounge and dining cars, and 30 on the "Priority" class lounge/coach cars, but are powered by regular diesels as in the regular express trains. The first such train for tourists, the Java Priority, debuted in 2024 after more than half a century, becoming the first tourist-only service in the KAI network in Java since the 1960s.

All these cars, together with the panoramic observation style cars, the 2018 design open sleeper/coach cars and the younger 16-seat compartment sleeper-chair cars (debuted 2023) all attached to regular long distance trainsets, are all operated by subsidiary firm KAI Wisata and maintained for KAI by Industri Kereta Api (INKA) Limited.

==== Disability carriage ====
On 18 October 2014, KAI launched the Jayabaya train for disabled people traveling the Pasar Senen–Surabaya–Malang route and back. The train includes two accessible carriages, which feature disability-friendly toilets, doors, and spacious areas. Similar facilities are planned for implementation on other trains.

==== Freight ====
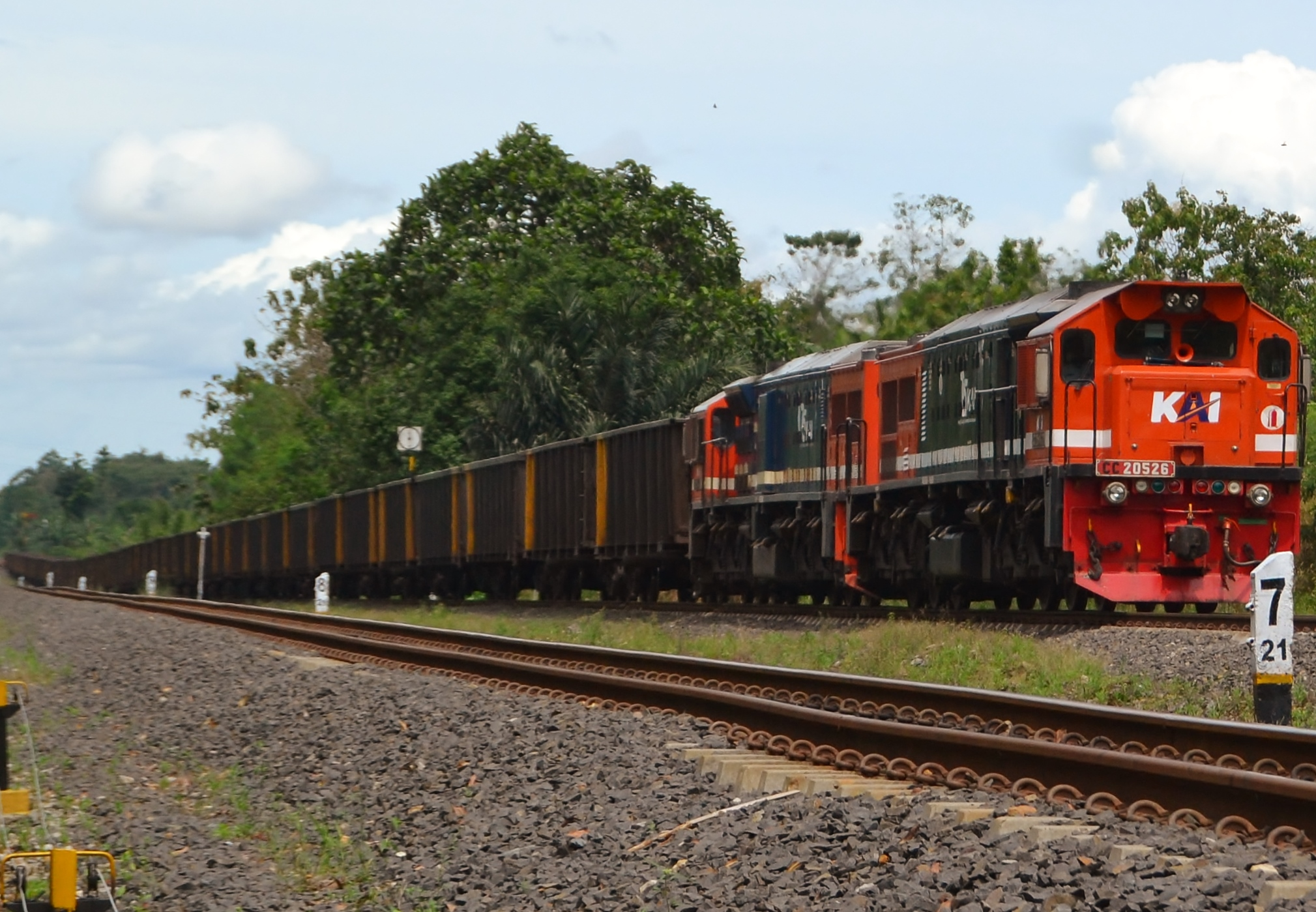
Babaranjang coal train. It usually consisted of up to 60 coal wagons.

KAI operates coal trains under a partnership with PT Bukit Asam (PTBA) in Southern Sumatra. The coal is transported from Tanjung Enim in South Sumatra to the Tarahan Rotary Car Dumper terminal in Lampung, from where it is shipped to Java, or from Tanjung Enim to Kertapati Apron Feeder in Palembang. After that, the coal is transported using barges for either export or domestic use.

KAI also has partnerships with several private coal mining companies in South Sumatra. The first private coal train, Baraswasta, was launched in 2011 from Suka Cinta, Lahat to Kertapati, Palembang. To support operations, Suka Cinta Station was developed from a small remote station to a larger station with coal loading facilities.

The company also operates intermodal container trains.

==== Library train ====
KAI operates a library train, Kereta Pustaka Indonesia, which houses documentation of company activities, small size assets, and books. The library train holds an exhibition for one week at a station before moving to the next.

=== Depots and facilities ===
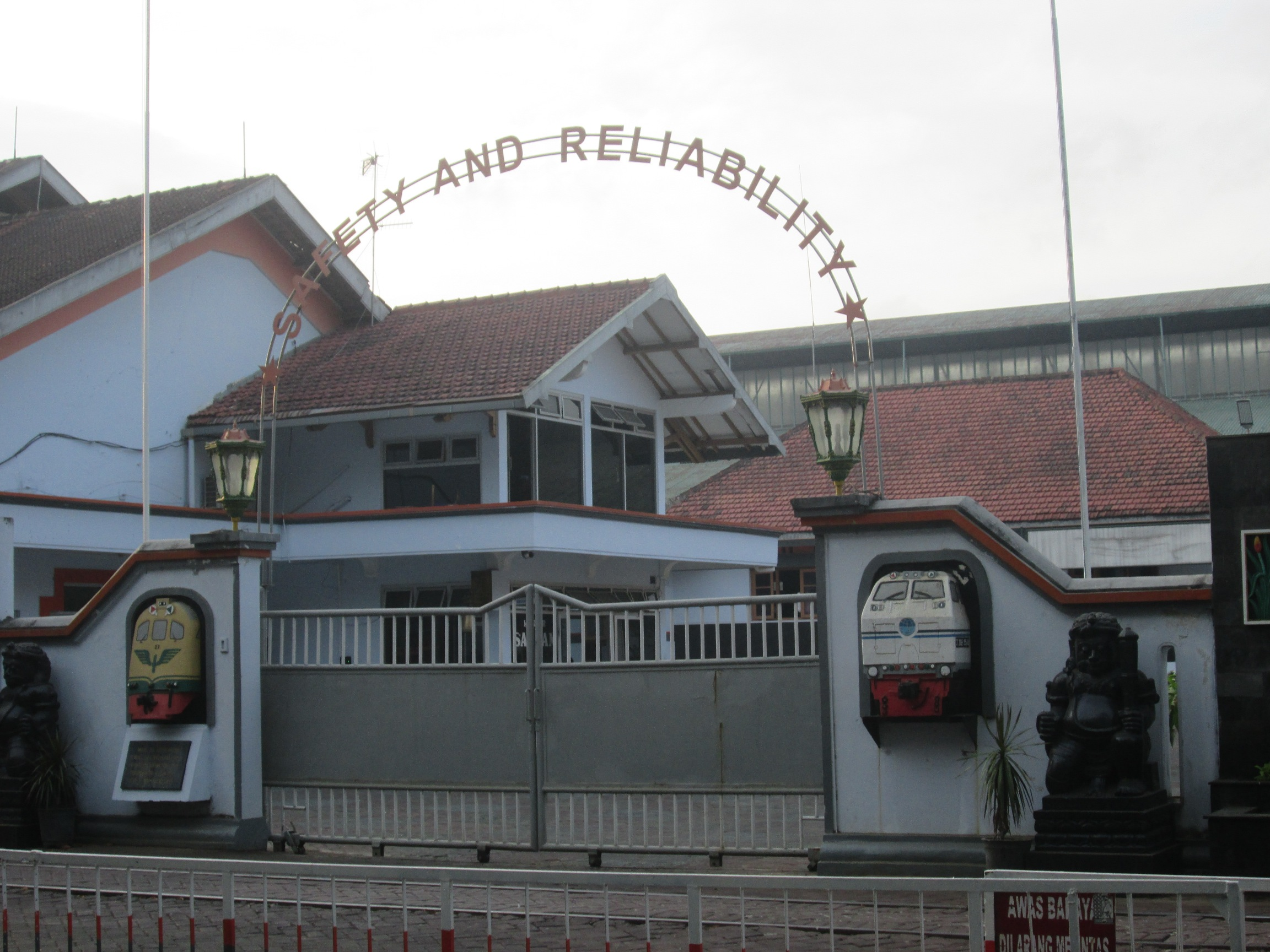
Gate of KAI Yogyakarta Locomotives and Rolling Stocks Workshop

In Java, KAI's main diesel workshop is located in Pengok, Yogyakarta, for maintenance of diesel electric and diesel hydraulic locomotives. In Sumatra, the maintenance shops are in Lahat Regency (South Sumatra), Padang (West Sumatra), and Pulubrayan (North Sumatra).

Other rolling stock workshops are present in Manggarai (Jakarta), Tegal (Central Java), and Gubeng (Surabaya, East Java). These places are used for maintenance of passenger carriages and freight wagons.

A large stabling point and maintenance facility for electric multiple units are located in Depok, West Java.

Motive power depots are located in Medan, Padang, Padang Panjang, Kertapati, Tanjungkarang, Rangkasbitung, Cipinang (Jakarta), Bandung, Cirebon, Purwokerto, Cilacap, Kutoarjo, Semarang Poncol, Ambarawa, Yogyakarta, Solo Balapan, Madiun, Sidotopo (Surabaya), and Jember.

Large areas in front of Purwakarta Station (formerly a motive power depot) have been used to scrap disused economy-class electric multiple units since 2013.

=== Safety and security ===
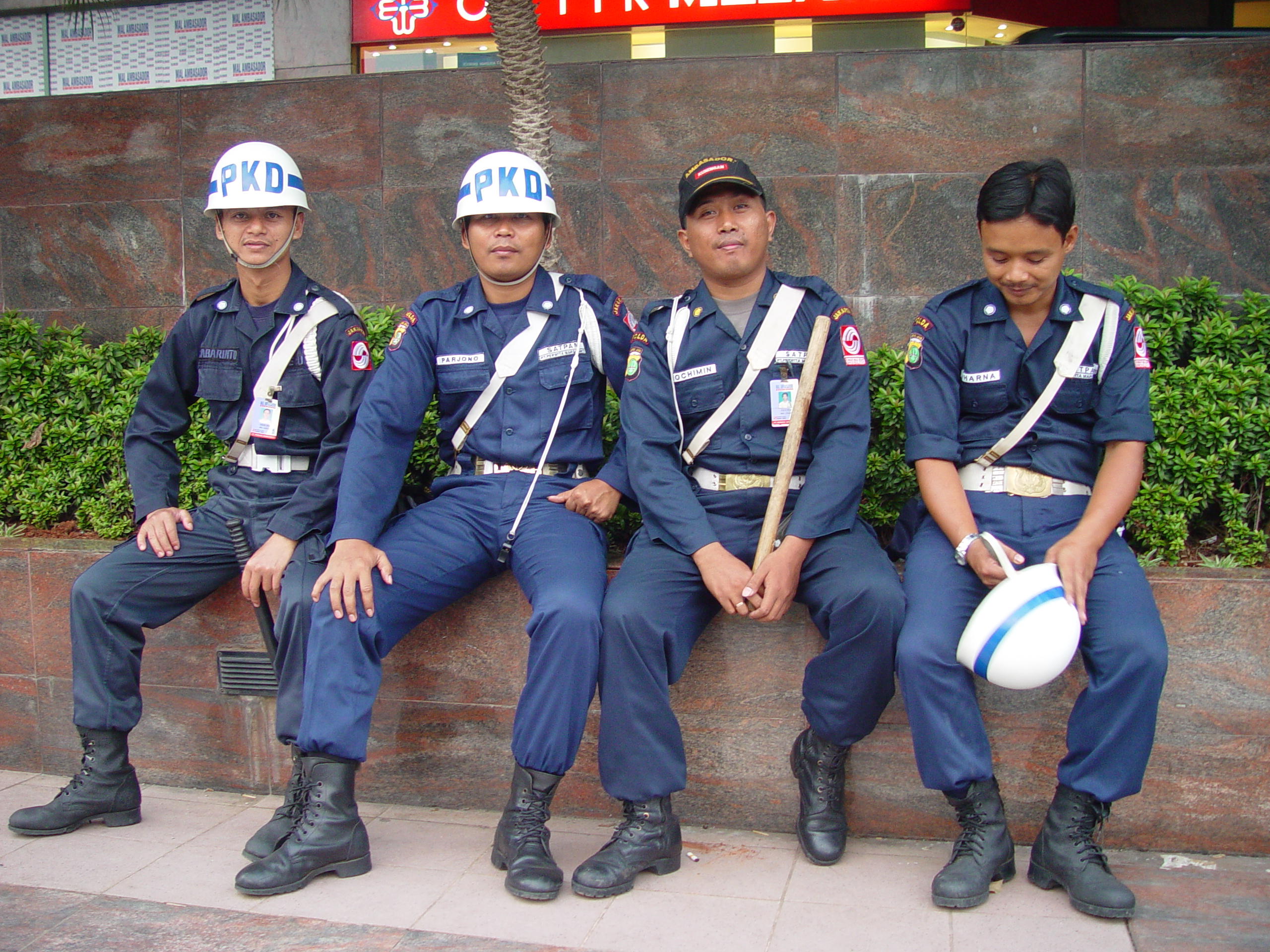
A group of Petugas Keamanan Dalam

Polsuska (Indonesian: Polisi Khusus Kereta Api, lit. Railroad Special Police) is KAI's security unit. It is responsible for maintaining law and order, including ensuring the security of railway stations and train passengers. Polsuska functions as a special railroad police unit that issues tickets and patrols stations to supplement the work of the national police. Polsuska officers wear black uniforms and orange berets pulled to the left. The unit is trained by the Indonesian National Police and operate under the command of the Indonesian Railway Company's Directorate of Safety and Security.

The commuter lines that serve Greater Jakarta maintain a separate security force Petugas Keamanan Dalam (PKD). Their service uniforms are dark blue and they wear white helmets (or peaked caps).

Every railway station employs security guards to assist Polsuska in maintaining order and security. During peak travel periods, such as national holidays, Polsuska may be assisted by members of the armed forces and police.

== Legislation ==
Act No. 23 of 2007 took effect on 25 April 2007. Under this law, track maintenance is handled directly by the government through the Directorate General of Railways under the Ministry of Transportation.

== Logo history ==
The first logo of the Republic of Indonesia Railway Service (1950–1953)

Wing DKA, currently used as heritage logo

When it was first inaugurated as a single company, the logo of the Republic of Indonesia Railway Service was a red and white circle with a sketch of the front of a steam locomotive at its centre. This logo was used from 1945 to 1950.

The second logo during the Djawatan Kereta Api era was launched in the form of a circle around a winged wheel with the initials DKA in the centre, and the words "Djawatan" at the top and "Kereta Api" at the bottom. With the launch of the CC200 locomotive in September 1953, the winged wheel logo design began to be used on the front and rear of the locomotive. The wheels featured five twin wings. This logo was then used as the locomotive logo until the company's transformation into a Perum in early 1991.

Wahana Daya Pertiwi, the KAI emblem

With the transfer of the company's form as a government-owned corporation from being a government department in 1963, PNKA adopted its first corporate emblem named "Wahana Daya Pertiwi," meaning "transformation of railways as a reliable means of transportation to realize national welfare goals". The logo is a Garuda gripping a train wheel and wearing a pentagonal shield necklace with the words "KA". The wheel stands on a ribbon with the words "Wahana Daya Pertiwi", which also supports rice and cotton on the left and right of the wheel.

Currently, the "Wahana Daya Pertiwi" symbol is used as a symbol of service and ornaments for PT KAI buildings (similar to Coat of Arms), and is attached to pins, peaked caps, and emblems on the left sleeve of KAI employee uniforms. This symbol is also on the front of KAI's inspection train and on the left and right sides of the vintage CC 201 83 31 series locomotives belonging to the SMC Main Depot.

In 1988, the PJKA logo, now as a Limited Liability Company, was replaced with a blue pentagon, and used as a locomotive logo as well as a company logo, and the "Wahana Daya Pertiwi" symbol was changed to a service symbol. This blue pentagon logo did not last long considering that PJKA wanted to change its logo again until the end of 1990. The pentagon-based logo has the word "KA" in the middle which is formed from train bogie wheels.

As a prelude to the transformation as a Public Corporation, PJKA entrusted Priyanto Sunarto (Pri S.) and Indarsjah T. as consultants for the design of the Perumka logo. The logo was designed by Iman Sudjudi at Studio OK!, and was nicknamed the "Z letter logo" or "number 2 logo". Perumka informed that the logo featured an orange parallelogram containing silhouettes of two fast trains with pointed ends, symbolizing the direction of travel and the principle of "giving and receiving." Underneath it is written "KERETAPI". The logo was launched together with the inauguration of Perumka on 2 January 1991.

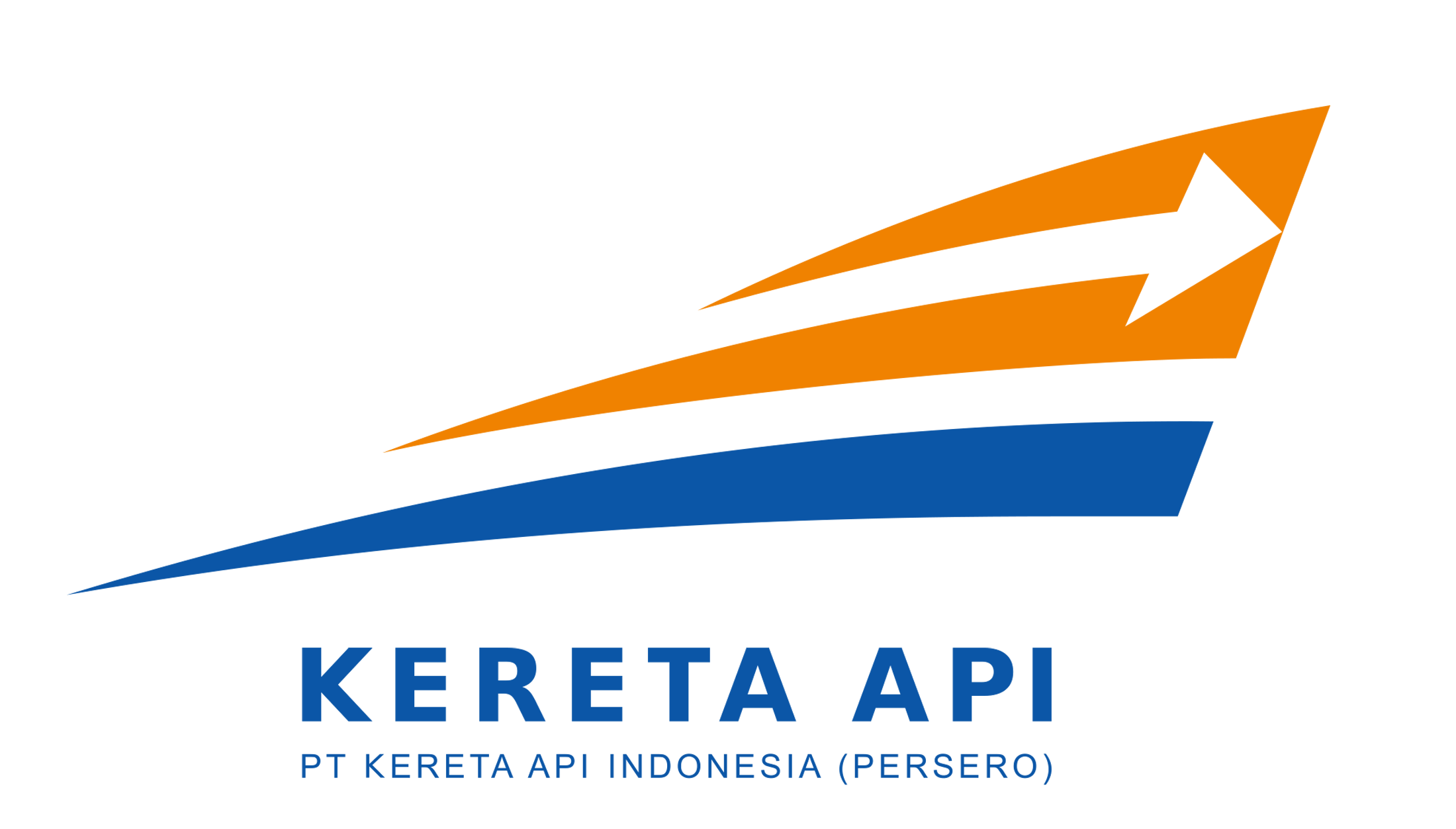
Logo of PT KAI (28 September 2011 – 28 September 2020)

On 28 September 2011, coinciding with its 66th anniversary, PT KAI launched a new logo. The logo was created by Farid Stevy Asta, vocalist of the rock band FSTVLST, who won first place in the company's new logo design competition. Asta, who worked on the KAI logo at LibStud, said that he himself was "inspired by the old KAI logo" (the letter Z). The logo consists of three curved lines with two orange, one blue below, and a transparent arrow. PT KAI describes the elements of the logo as follows: lines as dynamic movements in achieving the vision and mission, and arrows symbolizing "integrity values". The two oranges symbolize "internal-external excellent service (customer satisfaction)," and the blue symbolises "innovation to provide added value to stakeholders".

In commemorating its 75th anniversary on 28 September 2020, PT KAI inaugurated a new logo in the form of three letters of the alphabet, namely "K", "A", and "I" which are written in italics (depicting the company's progressive, open, and trustworthy character). The train-like accent on the letter "A" symbolizes "hope to advance the company as the best and most synergistic transportation ecosystem" and the use of two colours that have different meanings from the previous logo, namely the combination of these two colors reflects aspects in "harmonious relations between KAI and all stakeholders in the railway sector", with blue (on the letters "K" and "I") symbolizing "stability, professionalism, trustworthiness, and confidence of the company", and orange (on the letter "A") symbolizing "enthusiasm, creativity, and determination of the company".

== Subsidiaries ==
KAI operates multiple subsidiary businesses.

The Railway Employee Welfare Center Foundation (Yayasan Pusaka), one of PNKA's foundations, established PT Karya Pusaka (founded on 5 December 1967) and renamed it PT Pusaka Nusantara on 18 April 1970. Pusaka focuses on restoration, outsourcing, and cleanliness of train infrastructure and facilities.

The first subsidiary of PT Kereta Api was Reska Multi Usaha. This company focuses on business services to support railroad operations, such as restoration, parking, cleanliness on the train, restaurants and cafes, train washing, and comfort support. The company was formed on 2 July 2003. Reska owns the LoKo trademark, a restaurant chain with the theme of rail transportation that operates many station restaurants.

The Jabotabek Urban Transport Division manages electrified commuter service in Jakarta metropolitan area (currently KRL Commuterline) as a subsidiary under the name PT Kereta Commuter Indonesia (KCI).

Kereta Api Pariwisata (branded as KA Wisata, formerly IndoRailTour) provides rail tourism services. KA Properti Manajemen (KAPM) provides property management. Kereta Api Logistik (Kalog) provides logistics. A KAI joint venture with Angkasa Pura II operates an airport train service, under the name Railink via the Kualanamu Airport Rail Link train.

PT KAI is in a consortium with Wijaya Karya (Wika), Perkebunan Nusantara VIII (PTPN VIII), and Jasa Marga, under the name Pilar Sinergi BUMN Indonesia for the Jakarta–Bandung high-speed train project operated by Kereta Cepat Indonesia China (KCIC).

Pursuant to Indonesia's "two shareholder minimum" on limited companies, Yayasan Pusaka owns less than one percent of shares in KAI's consolidated subsidiaries except KAI Bandara and PSBI/KCIC.

=== Rail replacement through transport (Angkutan terusan) ===
KAI through transportation is a service provided to facilitate passenger travel, both those who are going to the station and those who are going to continue their journey after getting off the train. Some of PT KAI's through transportation routes include:

==== Semarang to Demak, Kudus, and Pati ====
This through transportation serves a round-trip route from Semarang Tawang Station or Poncol Station to the three cities. It uses Isuzu Elf vehicles equipped with air conditioning, reclining seats, entertainment systems, and USB chargers.

==== Purwokerto to Wonosobo, Banjarnegara, and Purbalingga ====
This service operates from Purwokerto Station to the three destinations and back. It uses an Elf fleet with a capacity of 12 passengers.

== Former subsidiaries ==
=== Dinas Pelayaran ===
Dinas Pelayaran Perusahaan Jawatan Kereta Api
- Type: Division
- Industry: Water transportation
- Founded: 1950s
- Defunct: 1989
- Fate: Assets were transferred to ASDP Indonesia Ferry and Dharma Lautan Utama
- Headquarters: Bandung, Indonesia
- Area served: List: Madura Strait; Bali Strait; Sunda Strait; Musi River; Ogan River
- Products: Transportation by ferry
- Parent: Perusahaan Jawatan Kereta Api
- Website: www.kai.id

Dinas Pelayaran (lit. Sailing Services) was the company's water transportation division. Its service was formed in the 1950s after the merger of the Republic of Indonesia Railway Department (DKARI) and the Staatsspoorwegen en Verenigde Spoorwegbedrijf (SS/VS) to become the Railway Department (DKA)—formed to serve passengers crossing Madura, Bali, and Sunda straits, as well as the Ogan and Musi rivers. The crossing service provided is continuous transportation for train passengers who wish to continue their journey by crossing the rivers or straits served. In 1989, the company dissolved this along with the formation of ASDP. Other reasons, such as the construction of Ampera Bridge in Palembang and the decommissioning of the railway line on Madura Island, made the division's fate even more gloomy.

==== History ====
Along with the merger of DKARI and SS/VS into the Railway Service (DKA) in the early 1950s, several ferries and tugboats or pilot boats were also provided to DKA. Ferries were specifically for canal transportation that served passengers, goods, and vehicles that would cross the Sunda Strait, Bali Strait, and Madura Strait, as well as the Musi River and Ogan River. Tugboats and pilot boats were used to guide large ships entering and leaving the port.

At that time, DKA received the handover of the railway station in the port complex along with its dock which had originally been managed by railway employees such as Merak Station with Merak Port, Long Station with Long Port, Ujung Station with a pontoon dock, Kamal Station with a pontoon dock, and Banyuwangi Lama Station which was integrated with DKA's feeder bus and crossed by DKA's ferry to Gilimanuk Port, Bali.

The operation of the Railway Service's ferry as a connecting transport has many benefits and has successfully attracted many enthusiasts. The Railway Department provides shipping with several routes, such as Merak Port-Long Port and the Musi River crossing to support the Jakarta-Palembang connection via train, Ujung Station pontoon pier–Kamal Station pontoon pier to support the connectivity of the Surabaya railway line with the Madura railway line and the mobility of its residents, and Gilimanuk Port-Banyuwangi (former Boom Port). On the Gilimanuk Port-Banyuwangi shipping route, the Railway Department also provides feeder bus services. The connectivity of Banyuwangi with Bali Island greatly supports the creation of connectivity and social mobility in the region, especially in the tourism sector.

In addition to ferries, the Railway Service also has a number of tugboats that are on duty at the port/pier near Kertapati Station to guide barges from Palembang Port to the port/pier Kertapati Station. These tugboats are under the inspection of the South Sumatra Exploitation Leadership.

Inter-island crossing activities in Indonesia have been pioneered by the Government in this case the Railway Service (DKA, PNKA, PJKA). Historical facts record that the ship Taliwang was one of the first connections from the Merak–Panjang route in 1952.

In 1960, the Dutch Government provided a grant to the Indonesian Government in this case the Railway Department (DKA) in the form of three 2,314 GT ships imported directly from the Netherlands: KM Halimun C/S PKMH and KM Krakatau in 1961, and KM Bukit Barisan in 1962. Unfortunately, KM Bukit Barisan caught fire and sank while unloading at Pelabuhan Merak in 1977. The three ships were built at the Zaandam Shipyard with a Werkspoor 750 DK × 2 production engine, used to serve crossings from Pelabuhan Panjang (Lampung) to Merak Port (West Java) which is currently part of the Banten region.

The main service on this route is only passengers and goods. Vehicles were transported to the deck using a crane, as the ships lacked ramp doors. The expansion and development of Merak Ports III, IV, and V, now operated byits fleet of ships ASDP, serves as a reminder of the former port operations conducted by Perusahaan Jawatan Api (PJKA) for loading and unloading its fleet of ships.

==== Services ====
Here are the services that have been operated.

Location	Crossing	Fleet	Description
Sunda Strait	Merak-Panjang	KT Terate; KT Seroja; KT Anantasena; KM Halimun; KM Bukit Barisan; KM Krakatau; KM Karimun	The assets that still exist today are managed by PT ASDP Indonesia Ferry and PT Dharma Lautan Utama
Madura Strait	Ujung-Kamal	KM Joko Tole; KM Koneng Portrait; KM Maduratna; KM Pamekasan; KM Bangkalan; KM Judanagara (Yudha Negara); KM Paramarta; KT Trunojoyo; KT Rajabasa	The assets that still exist today are managed by PT ASDP Indonesia Ferry and PT Dharma Lautan Utama
Bali Strait	Boom (Banyuwangi)-Gilimanuk	KM Kintamani; KM Blambangan	The assets that still exist today are managed by PT ASDP Indonesia Ferry and PT Dharma Lautan Utama
Musi River and Ogan River	Palembang-Kertapati	K.T. Bhakti; KM Reni; KM Cendrawasih; KM Srigunting	The assets that still exist today are managed by PT ASDP Indonesia Ferry and PT Dharma Lautan Utama

==== Closure ====
Over time and changing regulations, PJKA stopped operating all of its fleet of ships and handed them over to be operated and managed by PT ASDP in 1989. Furthermore, PJKA only focused on its main business, which was managing trains.

=== PT. Rama Restorka (PO Mutiara) ===
In the 1990s, PO Mutiara (PT Rama Restorka) was used a bus as a continuing transportation for train passengers from Banyuwangi Baru Train Station (Ketapang) to Ubung Bus Terminal Denpasar and the Perumka representative office on Jl. Teuku Umar Denpasar, Bali.

== See also ==
- Jakarta Monorail
- KA Commuter Jabodetabek
- Polsuska
- Persatuan Buruh Kereta Api
- Rail transport in Indonesia
- List of Kereta Api Indonesia rolling stock classes
- List of locomotives in Indonesia
- List of railway accidents and incidents in Indonesia
- List of defunct railways in Indonesia
- Trams in Jakarta
- Transport in Jakarta
- Indonesian railway rolling stock numbering system and classification
