= Tuntang railway station =

Railway station in Indonesia

Tuntang Station Stasiun Tuntang
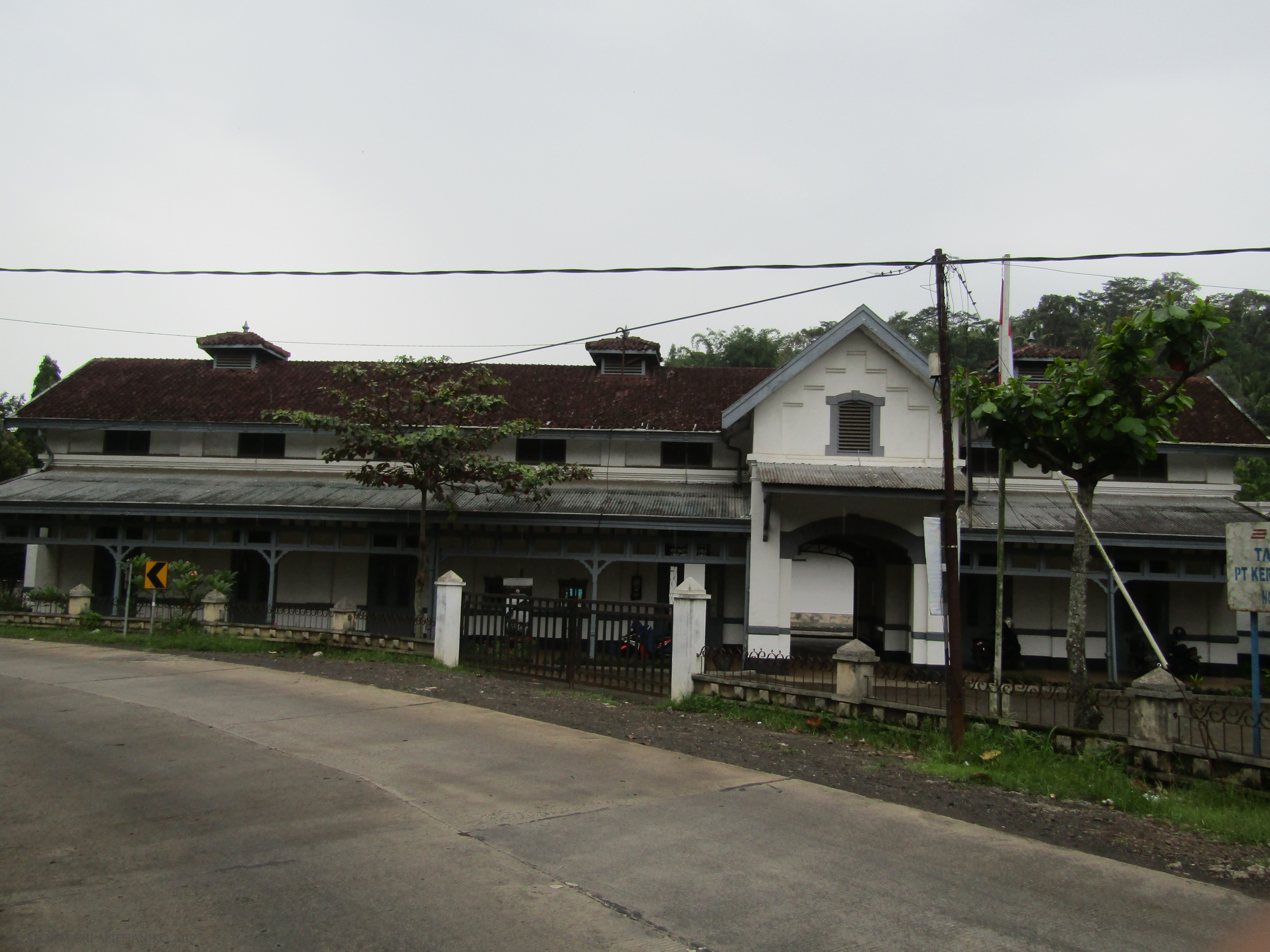
- Tuntang Station front façade in 2019

General information
- Location: Jalan Raya Salatiga–Tuntang–Bringin–Kedungjati, Tuntang, Semarang Regency, Central Java, Indonesia
- Coordinates: 7.260699°S 110.454034°E
- Elevation: +464 m
- Owner: Kereta Api Indonesia
- Manager: Kereta Api Indonesia
- Line: Kedungjati–Secang
- Platforms: 1 side platform 1 island platform
- Tracks: 4

Construction
- Architectural style: Chalet-NIS

Other information
- Station code: TTG • 3305
- Classification: Class III

History
- Opened: 21 May 1873; 2002 (reopened)
- Closed: 1976
- Rebuilt: 1905
- Original company: Nederlandsch-Indische Spoorweg Maatschappij
Location
- Location within Java

Tuntang Station (TTG) is a class III railway station located in Tuntang District, Semarang Regency, Central Java, Indonesia. The station is located at an altitude of +464 meters and is operated by Operation Area IV Semarang. The station only serves excursion trains from the Ambarawa Railway Museum

== History ==
The station construction was started in 1871 and was opened on 21 May 1873 alongside the Kedungjati–Ambarawa line. The current station building was constructed in 1905 as part of a reconstruction program that was done by Nederlandsch-Indische Spoorweg Maatschappij (NIS) on its station in the early 20th century. The new station building architecture is similar to the Bringin Station. Tuntang Station adopted the Chalet-NIS architectural style that was introduced by NIS on its new station construction in the early 20th century.

The Kedungjati–Ambarawa line was inactive beginning on 1 June 1970 and it was officially closed in 1976. The line was completely severed from the mainline at Kedungjati Station when a bridge in the line collapsed in 1978.

Shortly after the closure, the station served an excursion train from Ambarawa for a while before the tracks were closed due to damaged rails. The tracks then fell into disrepair, but it was reopened in 2002 after repairs were done. Initially, the station only served excursion draisines, but in 2009 the station was renovated and then it could serve the tourist steam trains.

On 14 January 2013, the plans for the Kedungjati–Tuntang line reactivation were signed. The reconstruction work was started in 2014, but the progress was halted in 2015 and as of 2021 it is yet to be resumed.

== Building and layout ==
Tuntang Station is located on the banks of Tuntang River. The station has four active lines and one defunct line without its tracks. Line 2 is straight, while line 3 doesn't have its tracks. Line 4 and 5 lead to a locomotive shed to the west of the station. The station warehouse is located between line 4 and defunct line 3.

The Tuntang locomotive shed is used to store some historic retired diesel locomotives. It was planned that the station would be transformed into diesel locomotive museum in the future.

== Services ==
There are no train service at this station. Tuntang Station only serves as shunting spot for the Ambarawa excursion train on its return trip to the Ambarawa Railway Museum.

== Gallery ==
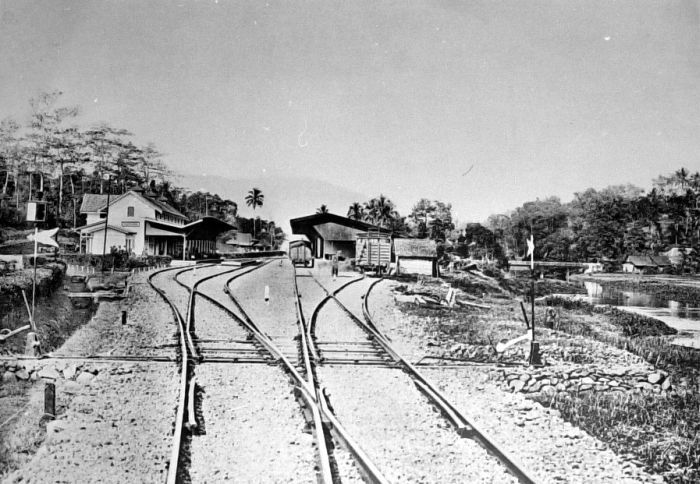
Tuntang Station in the 1910s

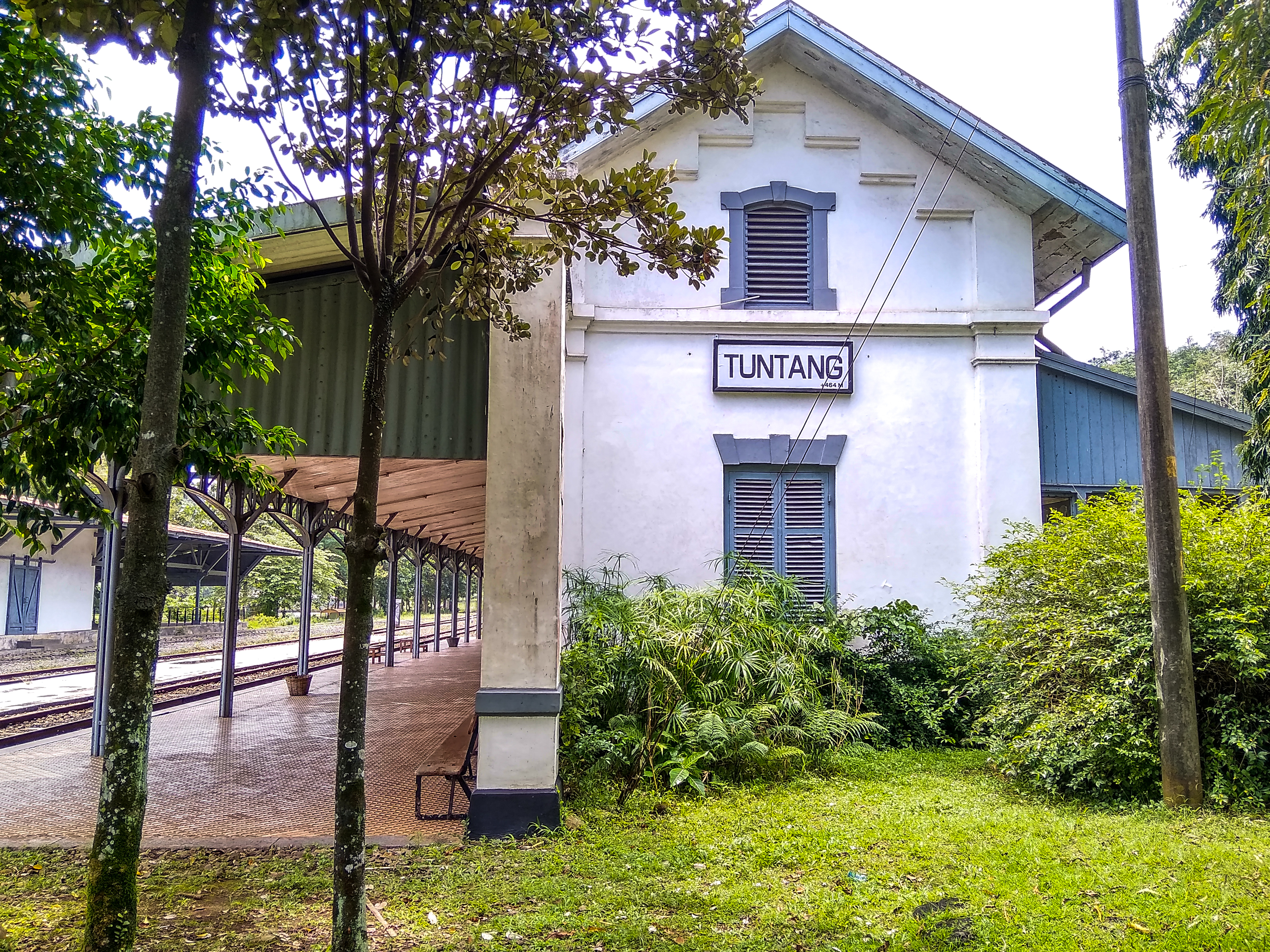
Side view of the station building

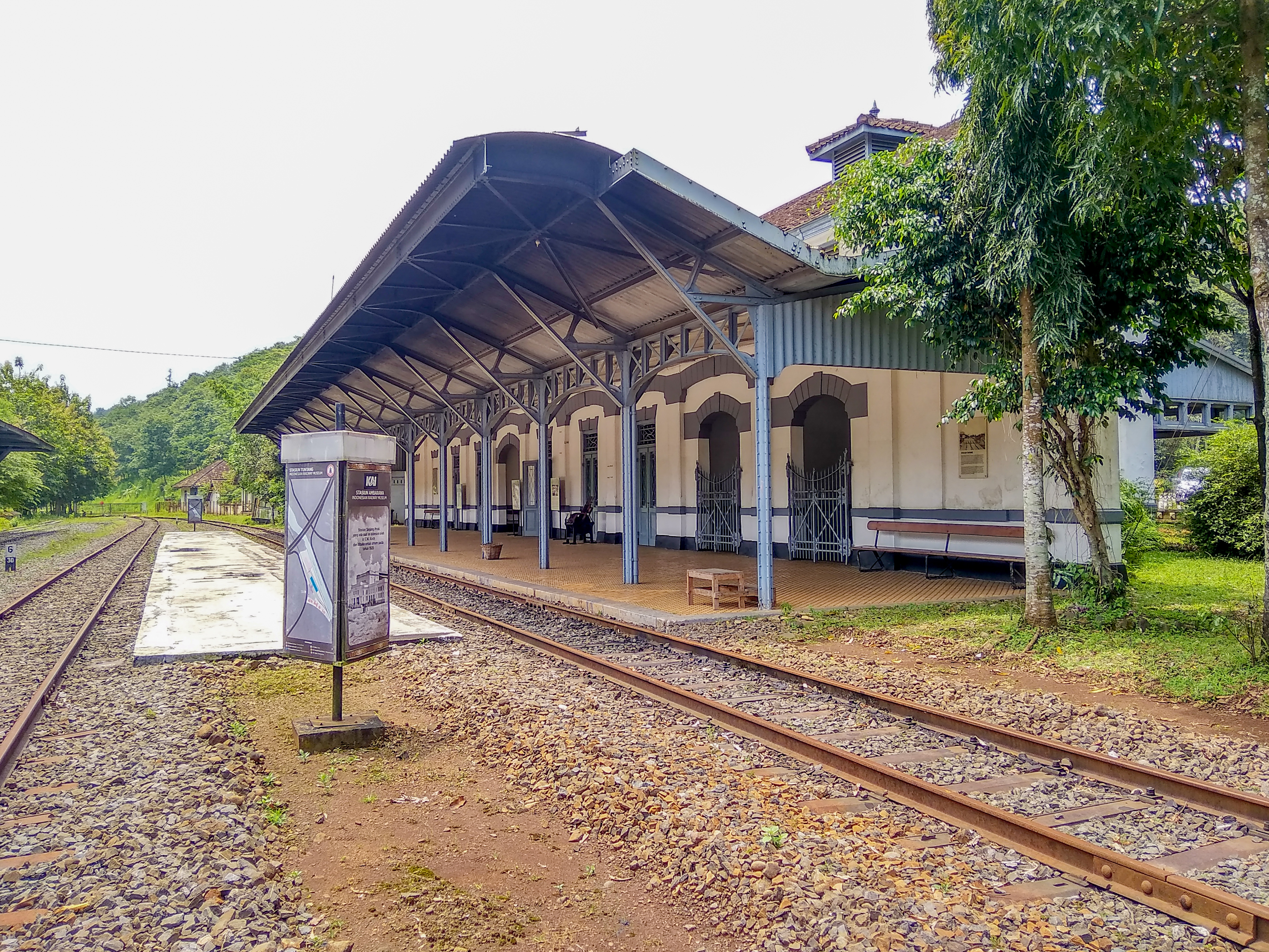
Tuntang Station platforms

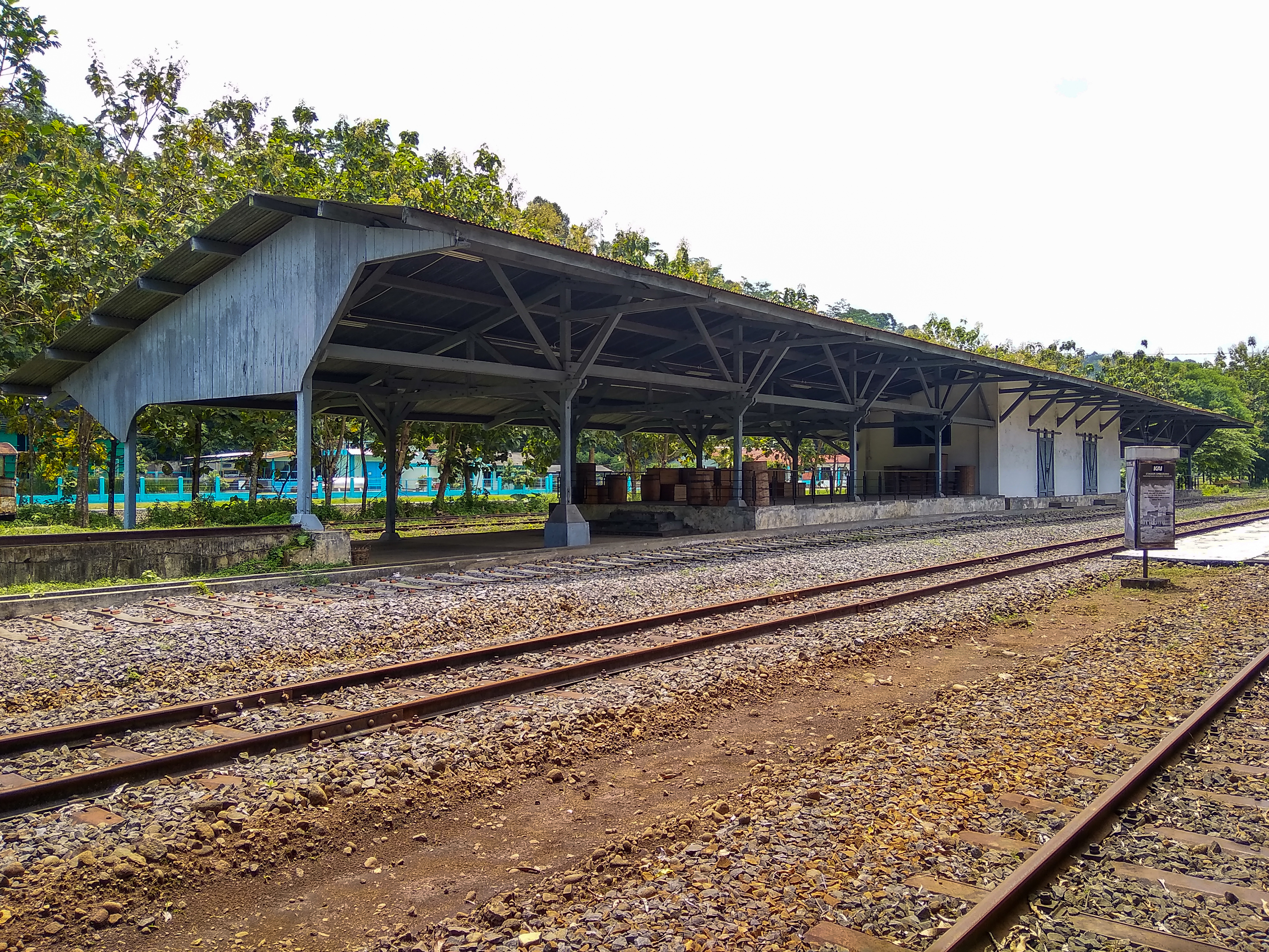
Tuntang Station warehouse

Preceding station	Kereta Api Indonesia	Following station
~~Bringin~~ towards Kedungjati	Kedungjati–Secang	Ambarawa towards ~~Secang~~
