= Persatuan Buruh Kereta Api =

Persatuan Buruh Kereta Api (Railway Workers Union, abbreviated PBKA) was a trade union of railway workers in Indonesia. It was affiliated with the Kongres Buruh Seluruh Indonesia (KBSI) trade union centre. PBKA was one of the key unions of KBSI. As of March 1958, PBKA claimed a membership of 32,000. PBKA was led by Dr. Kusna.

PBKA was one of few unions in Indonesia at the time with a functioning check-off system to collective membership fees. As a result, PBKA (unlike most other unions) were able to employ a sizeable full-time staff. Moreover, through the membership fees PBKA was able to provide some health and accident insurance to its members.

By 1960 PBKA had become the dominant railway workers union in West Java.

PBKA and the railroad administration managed a joint Railway Workers Social Welfare Department, which gave support to forming cooperatives.
