= 2-8-8-0 =

Articulated locomotive wheel arrangement

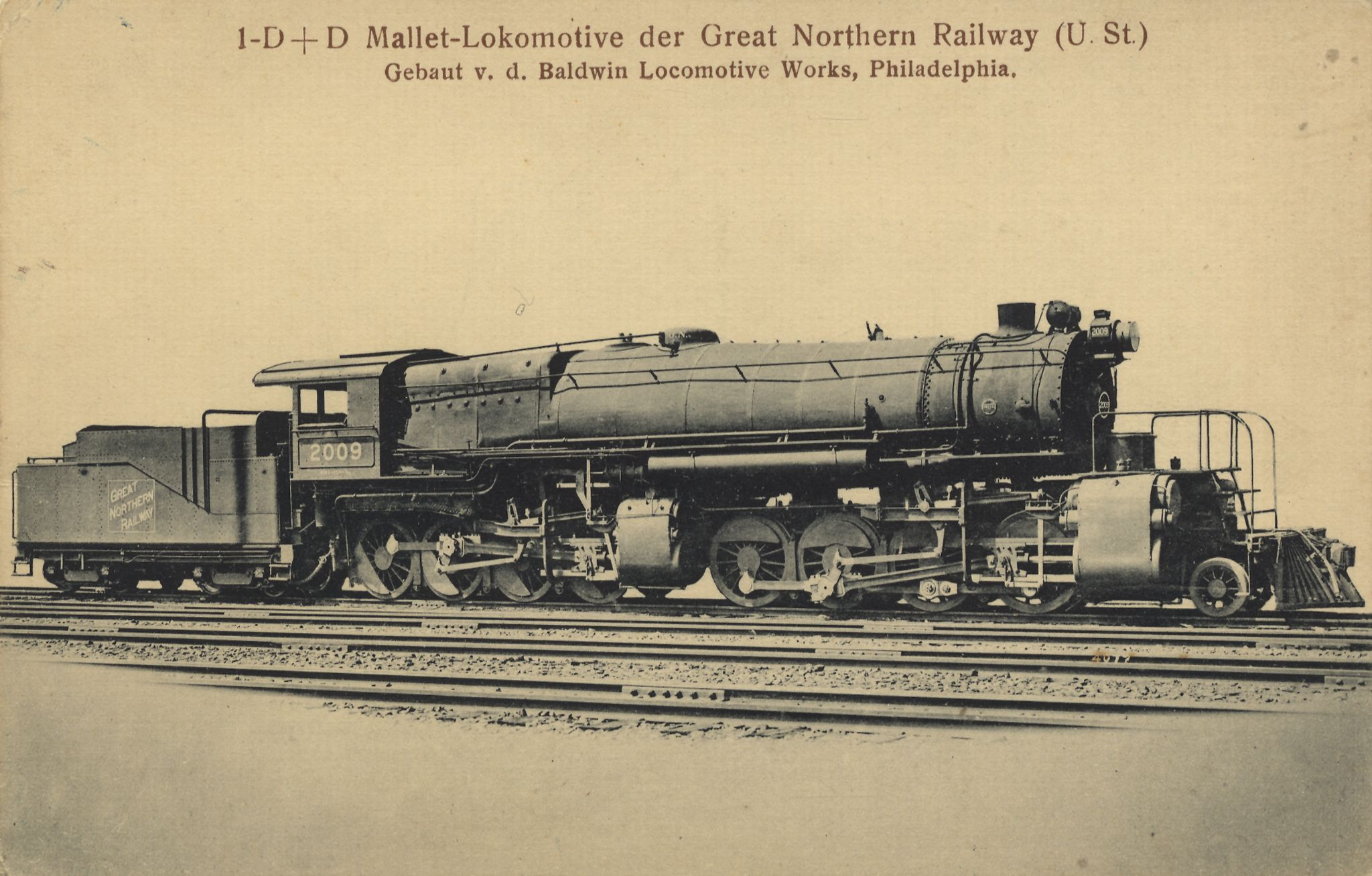
Great Northern Railway 2-8-8-0 Class N-1 locomotive, built at the Baldwin Locomotive Works in August 1912.

In the Whyte notation for the classification of steam locomotives by wheel arrangement, a 2-8-8-0 is a locomotive with a two-wheel leading truck, two sets of eight driving wheels, and no trailing truck.

== Equivalent classifications ==
Other equivalent classifications are:

- UIC classification: 1DD (also known as German classification and Italian classification)
- French classification: 140+040
- Turkish classification: 45+44
- Swiss classification: 4/5+4/4

The UIC classification is refined to (1'D)D for Mallet locomotives.

== Usage ==
=== United States ===
The Great Northern Railway used the 2-8-8-0s as their N-1's which were built by Baldwin in 1912. They were rebuilt by GN in 1932 as a N-2, and later re-rebuilt in 1940 as an N-3, The locomotives, after their third rebuild into a N-3, had a larger boiler and bigger tender. The N-3's served on the GN for a collective 45 years (including previous service lives as N-1 and N-2 classes), in use until retired in 1957.

The Union Pacific Railroad also operated this type. The Union Pacific 2-8-8-0s were built in 1918 and 1924 by ALCO-Brooks. The locomotives were used to haul heavy loads over Sherman Hill on the UP. An example of one is Union Pacific #3559, which was built July 1924 by ALCO-Brooks. The locomotives were most likely retired in the late 1940s to early 1950s because of slow speeds on freight, hauling at 12 miles an hour. In comparison, the 9000 class of the Union Pacific can pull the same weight at 50 miles an hour.

Out east, the Reading Railroad had 2-8-8-0s for coal switching on steep hills, also known as the Reading N-1, and the Baltimore and Ohio operated this type, with the B&O owning dozens of examples, most notably the EL-3 class. They were retired by the early 1950s. In the Midwest, the Kansas City Southern was a principal user of this configuration.

The Atchison, Topeka and Santa Fe Railway was the first to use the configuration. In 1911, their own workshop took a pair of standard 2-8-0 and combined them into a 2-8-8-0 Mallet articulated locomotive. Four examples were built, but were never entirely satisfactory and were converted back to 2-8-0 in 1923. The first 2-8-8-0 operated by Baltimore and Ohio was numbered EL-1/a, which was built in 1916 at Baldwin Locomotive Works. The western end of their network had ruling gradients greater than 2%, and the 2-8-8-0 offered exceptional tractive effort, enabling a single locomotive to move the heaviest freight trains. As well as building these locomotives from scratch, the last in 1920, ten were converted from 0-8-8-0 configuration in 1920 and a further ten from 2-8-8-2 in 1922. These locomotives remained in operation until after World War II, the last being withdrawn in 1955.

No 2-8-8-0 locomotives survive today; all were scrapped. However, one tender from the 2-8-8-0 #759 of the Kansas City Southern Railroad has been preserved, while the locomotive was scrapped. It is now preserved at the Illinois Railway Museum.

=== Indonesia ===
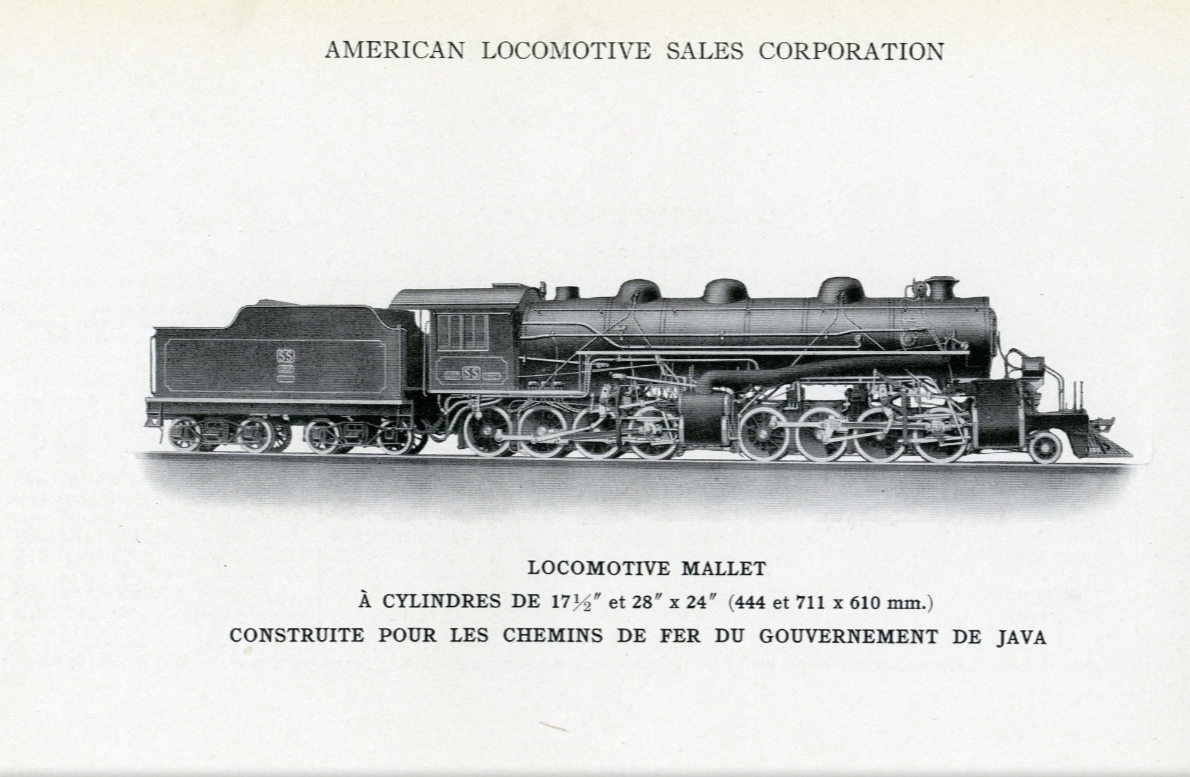
SS Class 1200 of Java

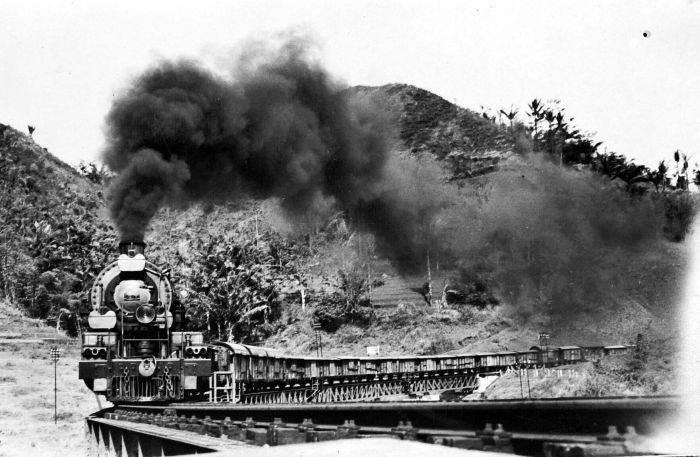
SS 1200 of the second batch going over the Cimeta Bridge above the Ciherang river, West Java

Indonesia was also recorded operating several types of 2-8-8-0 locomotives. This dates back to the colonial era, under the government of Dutch East Indies by their state railway company named Staatsspoorwegen (SS). In the early 20th century, especially in West Java (known as Priangan), faced with the increase in passenger and freight rail traffic. By 1913, it was reported that they lacked powerful locomotives to serve the increasingly congested train traffic. This was worsened by the southern Priangan line passing through the hills requiring a special locomotive to climb the steep contour line there. The only available locomotive of the time were the 0-4-4-2T SS Class 500 (DKA BB10), 2-6-6-0T SS Class 520 (DKA CC10) and the 2-12-2T SS Class 800 (DKA F10) or known as Javanic. However, these classes were not adequate for the line, with the SS 800's six rigidly-connected driving axles being unsuitable for the winding Priangan lines.

This was exacerbated by the outbreak of First World War which paralyzed many industries in Europe. Amid limited choices and demands to get new locomotives immediately, SS decided to order a class of extremely large locomotives from American Locomotive Company (Alco) in 1916. In just 6 months, eight 2-8-8-0s of the first batch arrived and were classed as SS Class 1200 (1201–1208), which were the largest locomotives in the Dutch East Indies. With a total weight of 133 tons, these locomotives have the profile of large American Mallets scaled down for narrow gauge (3 ft 6 in). However, their extreme size was not proportional to their capabilities; SS was disappointed because the Class 1200 could only reach the maximum speed of 40 km/h (25 mph) which was not suitable to haul the express trains in heavy terrain with the minimum speed of 45 to 50 km/h (28 to 31 mph). Learning from that, the 1920 batch of twelve were modified. Despite looking similar to the first batch, these weighed almost 5 tons heavier, making them the heaviest locomotives used in Java. However, their performance was not much improved from the first batch, with high fuel consumption and problems with unbalanced steam pressure (or back pressure) causing cracks in their frames, causing high operational and maintenance expenses.

By the end of First World War, European locomotive builders were once more operational, and SS soon ordered 10 new locomotives from three manufacturers: Hanomag, Sachsische Maschinenfabrik (Hartmann) in Germany and Werkspoor, N.V. in the Netherlands, which arrived in 1923–24. These were made based on Alco design but with a large number of refinements resulting in a 21 m (69 ft) length and 135-ton weight, being classed as 1250 (1251–1260). While the Alco SS 1200s used bar frames, those on the European SS 1250s used plate frames. The SS 1250 was much faster, able to reach speeds of 50 km/h (31 mph), but the problems with back pressure worsened.

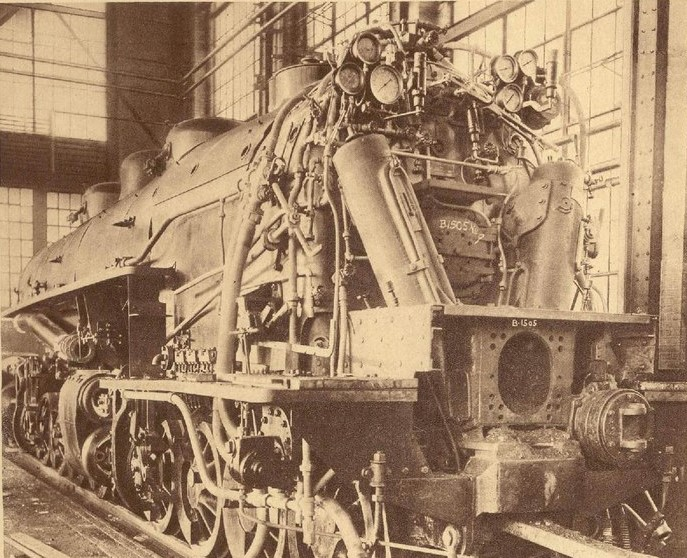
trial installation of a mechanical stoker on the second batch of locomotives

Finally in 1926, the SS Experimental Service managed by de Gruijter made modifications to SS 1260. After the back pressure was fixed, a double chimney was installed to maximize the engine performance, with the power output raised to 1,700 hp (1.3 MW) while driving at a constant speed of 45 km/h. These modifications were extended to the entire SS Class 1250s and 12 units of the second batch of SS Class 1200, while the first batch of SS 1200s was unchanged due to severe cracks in their frames. The next modification was aimed at operational efficiency; as the class requires a large amount of coal, SS trialled mechanical stokers that automatically moved coal to the firebox. However, this was called off due to increasing the axle load from 12 tons to 13 tons above the rail capacity.

During the Great Depression in the 1930s, SS withdrew their giant locomotives to save money on fuel and in response to declining traffic. However, in 1938 these locomotives were reinstated to haul freight trains, except for the first batch of Class 1200s (which had been dismantled for parts). After the Japanese occupation and Indonesian Independence, these locos were renumbered to DD50 (first batch), DD51 (second batch) and DD52 (SS 1250s) used by Djawatan Kereta Api (DKA) or Department of Railways of the Republic of Indonesia. When the Japanese arrived in 1942, they continued to work on Purwakarta–Banjar line.

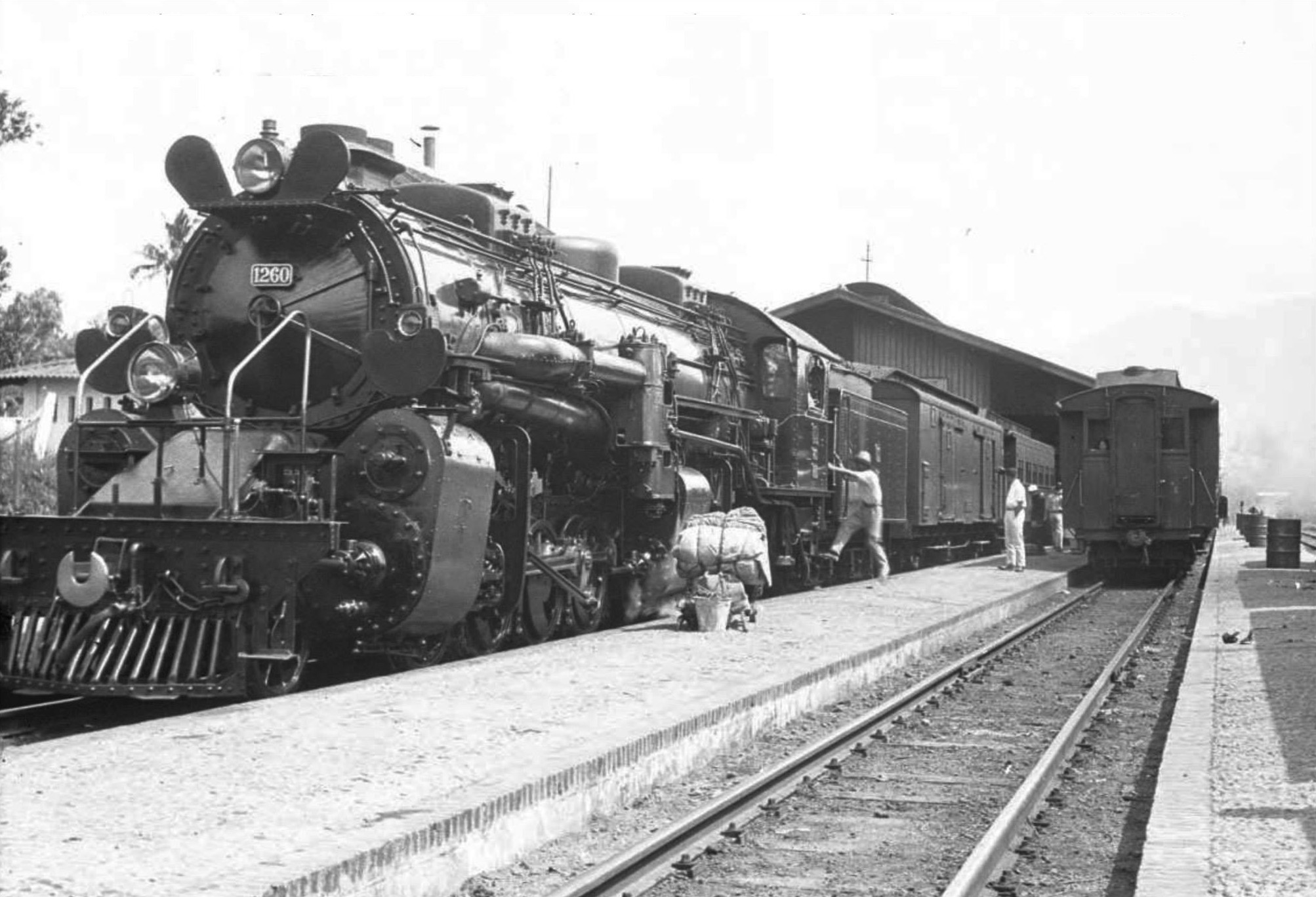
SS 1260 or DKA DD52 10

They were nicknamed Si Gombar or The Monster by locals along with CC50 counterparts due to their size and power in the mountain lines. DD50 and DD51 were retired in the late 1960s, but DD52 lasted longer with a few of them still operational in the early 1970s. At the time, the DD52 was the only operational 2-8-8-0 locomotive in regular service in the world. Over time, the engines broke down due to poor condition and difficult maintenance, which hastened to their retirement. All examples of the class were scrapped.
