= Hawu =

Hawu may refer to:

- Mount Hawu
- Hawu language
