= Citatah Cliffs =

Row of cliffs in West Java, Indonesia

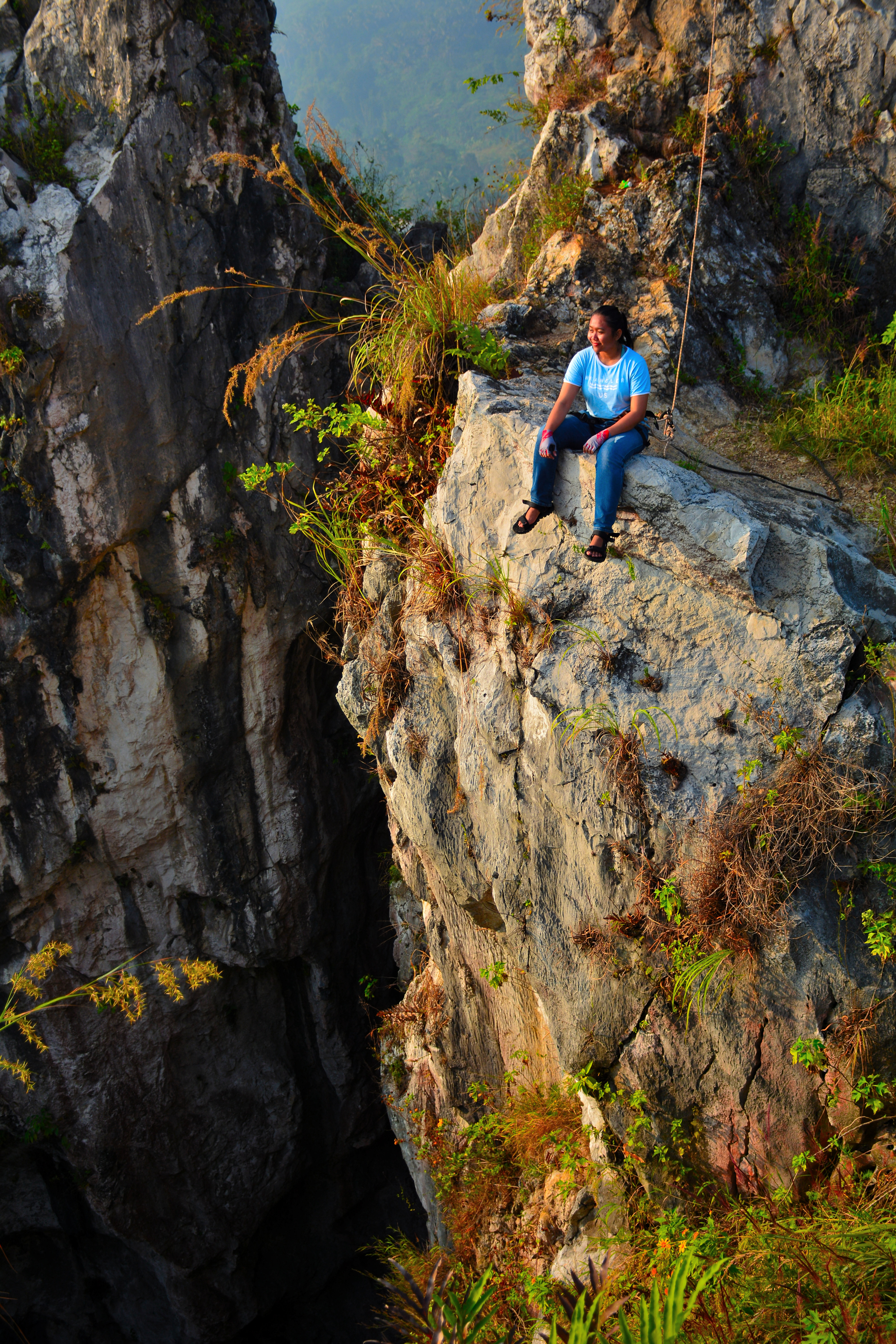
A woman sits at Citatah Cliff

Citatah Cliffs (originally called Pabeasan Cliffs) is a row of cliffs located in Citatah, West Bandung regency, West Java, Indonesia. Its exact location is at 5 km Padalarang. With the morphology of hilly area and formed largely of limestone, Citatah looks different from other hills in general.

Citatah was once the subject of discussion in various local and national media, after KRBC (Bandung Basin Research Group) conducted a study on this area. Some of KRBC's phenomenal discoveries were the discovery of an ancient site in the Pawon Cave on 9 December 2000. For the first time, tools made of stones and bones, earthenware, bone remnants, and animal teeth were discovered in Pawon Cave located at Pasir Pawon, which still in the area of Citatah karst.

Citatah is a very productive limestone mining area. This mining has been operated since the mid-19th century and still continues until now. By using more sophisticated tools and dynamite to blow up parts of the hills containing limestone, mining activity in this area has brought adverse impacts on Citatah's environment.

Generally, there are three cliffs in Citatah which are Citatah Cliff 48, Citatah Cliff 90 and Citatah Cliff 125. The name itself is a representative of their height.

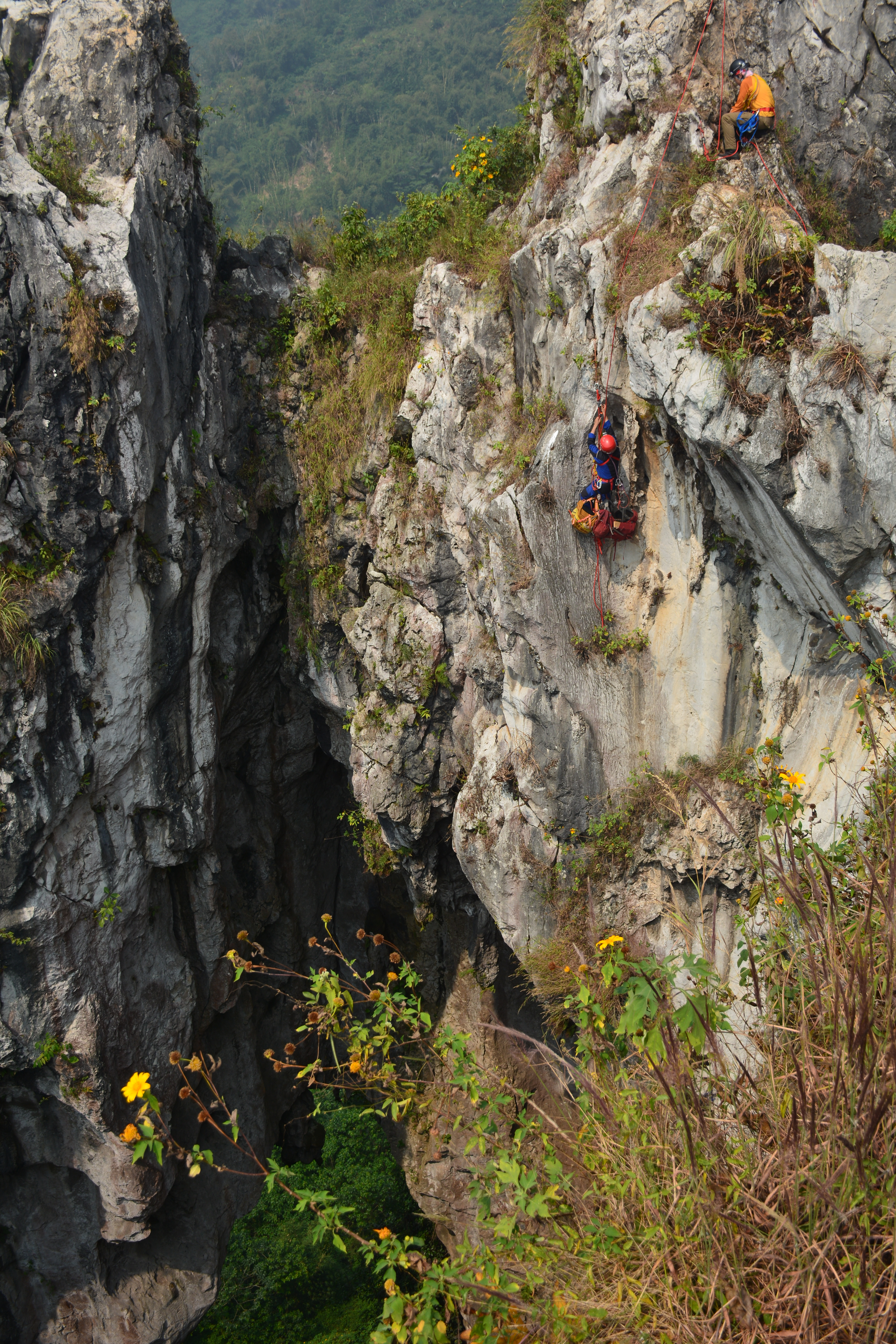
Citatah cliffs are the center of rock climbing activity

== Citatah 48 ==
Citatah 48 is located at Jl. Pamucatan Raya, Bandung, West Java. This cliff is formed from limestone. Its height is about 40–50 meters, hence climbers call it Citatah 48, although the cliff's official name is Mount Manik. There are 25 climbing paths with different difficulties in this cliff.

Citatah 48 has distinctive features that distinguish it from other Citatah cliffs. There is a dagger-shaped monument on top of this cliff.

This cliff is under the surveillance of Kopassus (Indonesian army special forces). To climb this cliff, legal permission from Kopassus is required. The permission must be obtained from the Training Center for Special Forces Training (Pusdikpassus) located in Batu Jajar, West Bandung. The activity permit must be submitted approximately one month before the activity.

== Citatah 90 ==
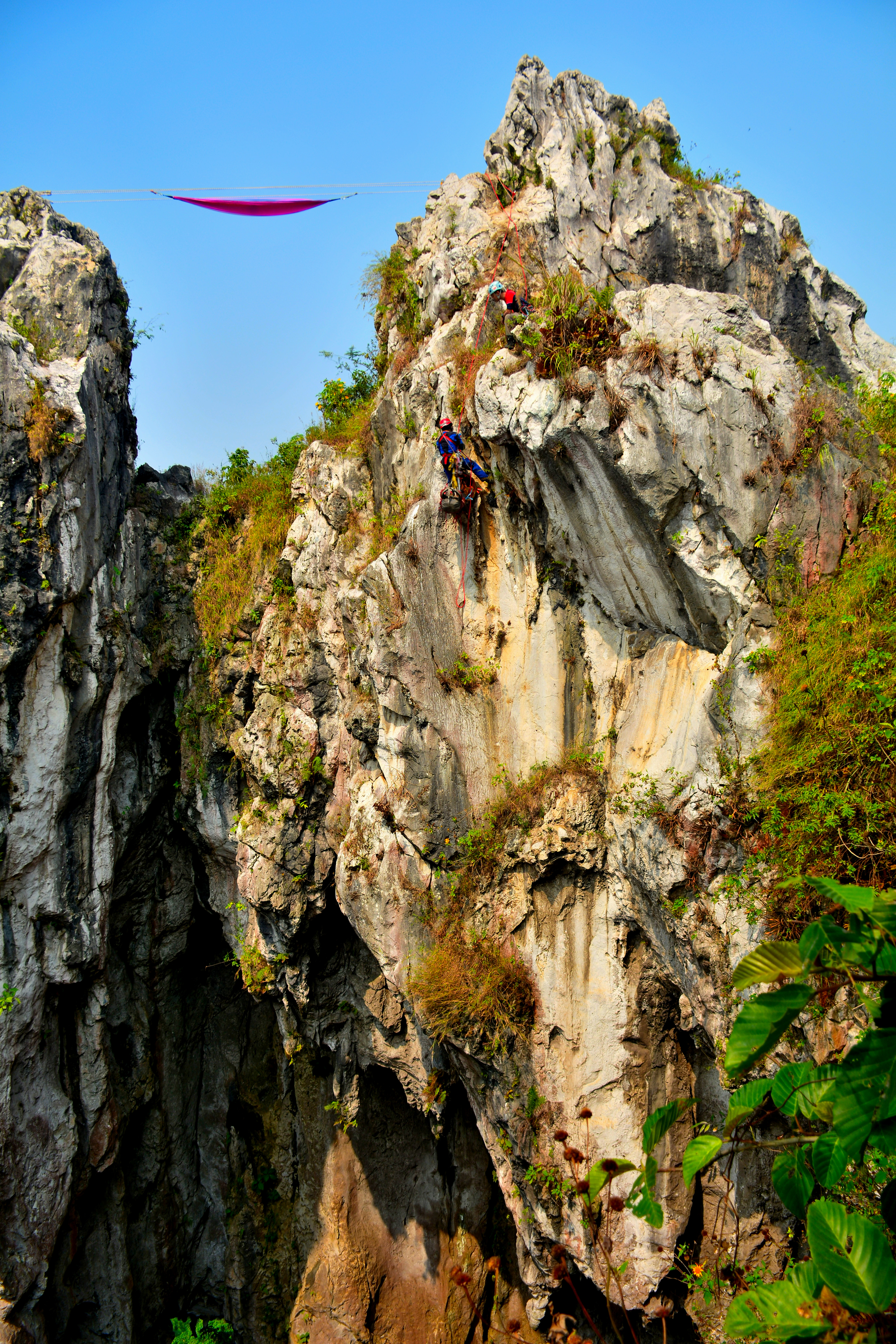
Citatah Cliff 125

Citatah 90's official name is Mount Pabeasan. Similar to the other two Citatah cliffs, Citatah 90 is made of limestone and located in Padalarang, Bandung, West Java. With a height around 90 meters, this cliff is located in the area of a limestone mine. Citatah 90 has a higher difficulty level of climb than other two cliffs. Its fragile surface increases the difficulty in climbing this mountain. There are about 4 to 5 commonly used climbing paths for this mountain.

== Citatah 125 ==
Citatah 125 is located at Mount Singgalang, the highest limestone mountain in the area. Its exact location is in Citatah Village, Cipatat District, West Bandung Regency. Its name comes from its 125-meter height from the surface. It is formed from andesite and marble rocks.

Citatah 125 is the center for rock climbing training. Rock climbing school in Bandung, Jakarta and their surrounding area use this place due to its easy access, which is located near Bandung – Cianjur highway.

There are many climbing routes available at this mountain. From easy to the most difficult route, climbers can choose the route they want to climb such as Hanoman or Eagle route. Each route has different characteristics. This diversity of climbing routes is suitable for educational purposes, mostly to introduce rock climbing to beginners. Therefore, climbers of Citatah 125 come from various backgrounds, from rookies to professional climbers.

== See also ==
- Mount Hawu
- Gunung Padang Megalithic Site, 45 km away
