= Cimeta railway bridge =

Railway bridge in West Java, Indonesia

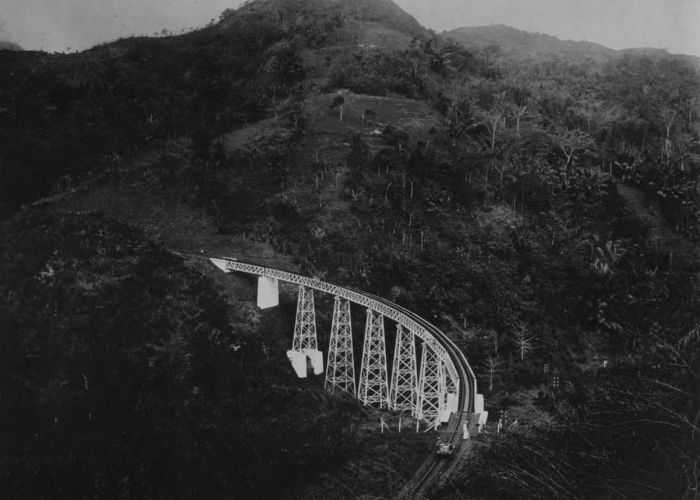
The bridge, shown in 1931.

The Cimeta railway bridge (Jembatan Cimeta in Indonesian) is a horseshoe-shaped railway bridge in Padalarang, West Java, Indonesia. It passes over the Ciherang River.

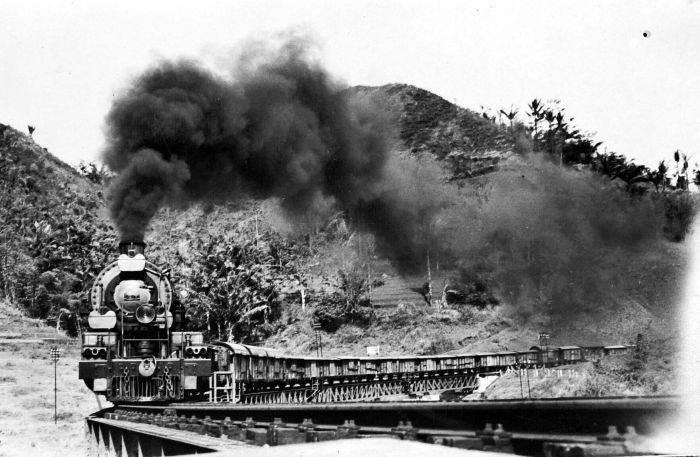
Steamlocomotive 2-8-8-0 on Cimeta bridge

The bridge was built during the Dutch colonial era.
