= Mount Hawu =

Mountain in West Java, Indonesia

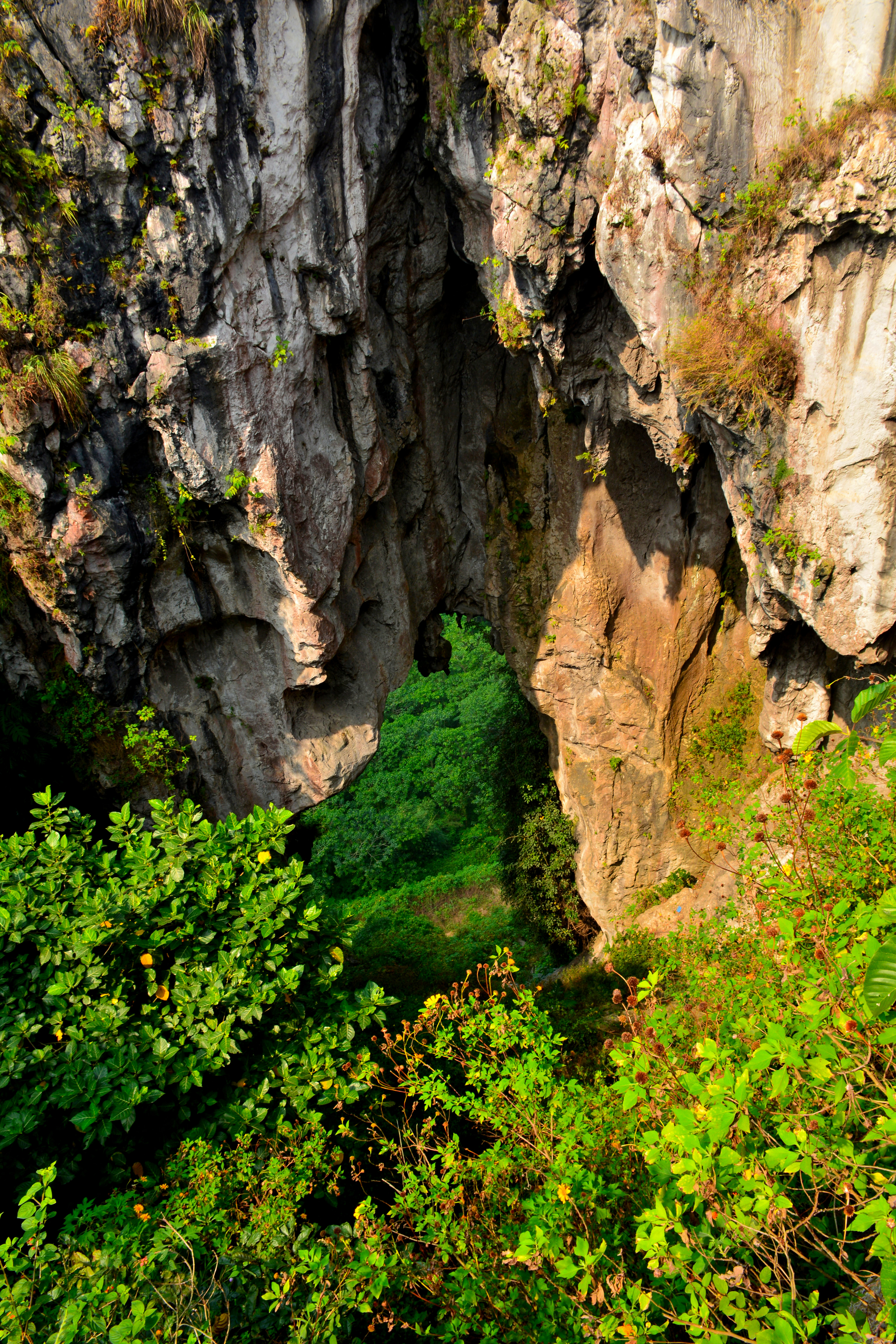
The Mount Hawu hole seen from above

Mount Hawu is a small mountain located in Padalarang district in West Bandung Regency, West Java, Indonesia. Padalarang is renowned for its towering limestone mountains. One of the most popular among local climbers is the cliff of Hawu Mountain.

Mount Hawu cliff is located behind the Citatah 125 meters cliff, another famous cliff among local climbers, or commonly called the Cretaceous Singgalang. To reach it, visitors have to walk around 30 minutes from Citatah cliff.

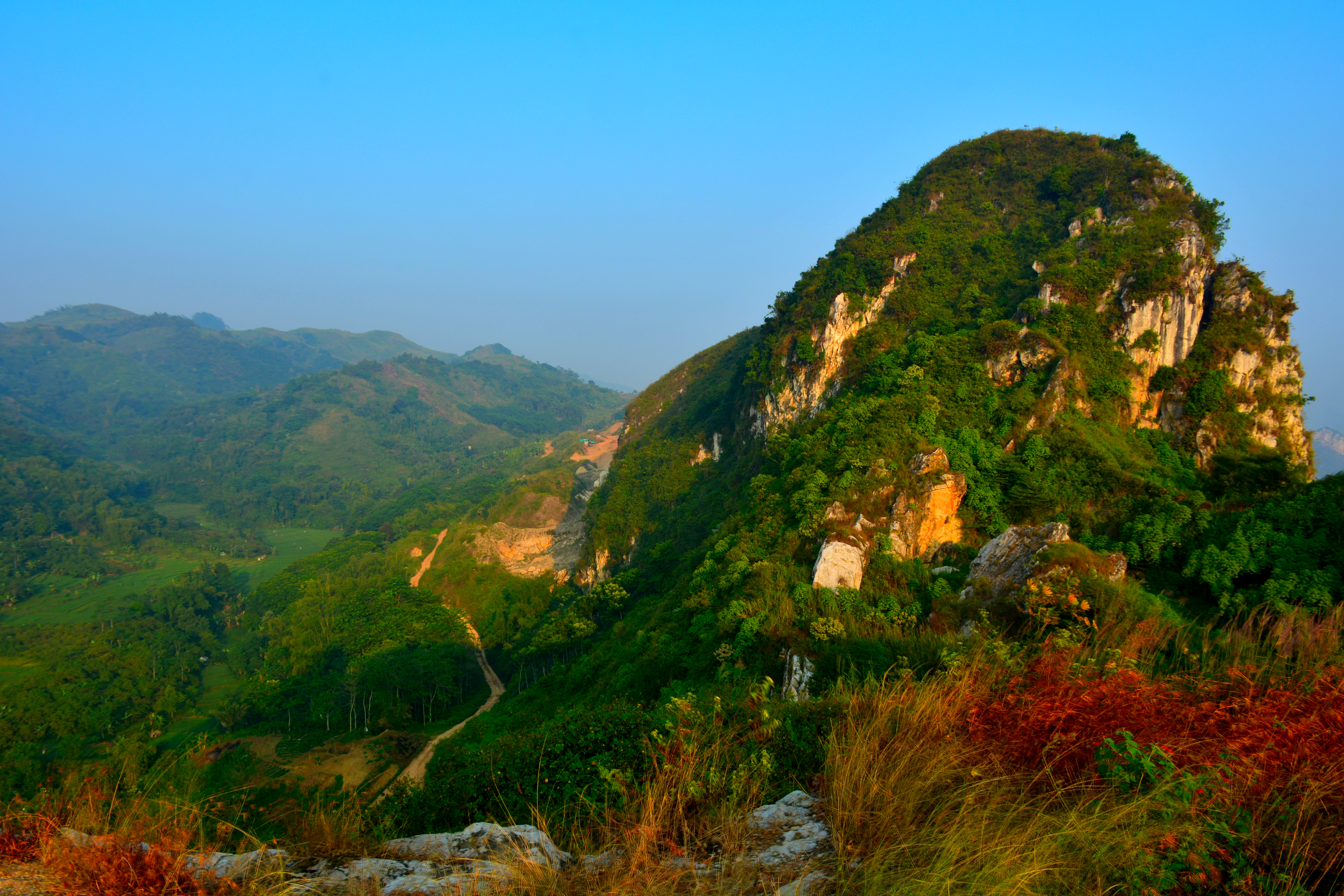
The view around Mount Hawu, Padalarang, West Java

Hawu is derived from Sundanese which means a place for firewood or traditional "stove" for cooking commonly used by the local. The name comes from Mount Hawu shape that has a large hole in the middle part and hollow on the upper part.

Unfortunately, this shape that fits the name of Hawu can only be seen from the front section of Hawu mountain, or precisely from the Cidadap village. Visitors who come from behind mount Hawu or from Pamucatan village cannot see this shape.

Mount Hawu is one of the limestone cliffs that belong to Citatah karst area with an area around one hectare wide. This mountain special feature is its natural bridge that occurs due to the process of vertical cave formation. The cave itself is called Karang Hawu Cave. This natural bridge is similar to the natural bridge in America, such as Virginia natural bridge and Arches National Monument in Utah. But ironically, the beauty of this limestone mountain is threaten by the presence of massive lime mining.
