= SS 800 class =

SS class 800 DKA class F10
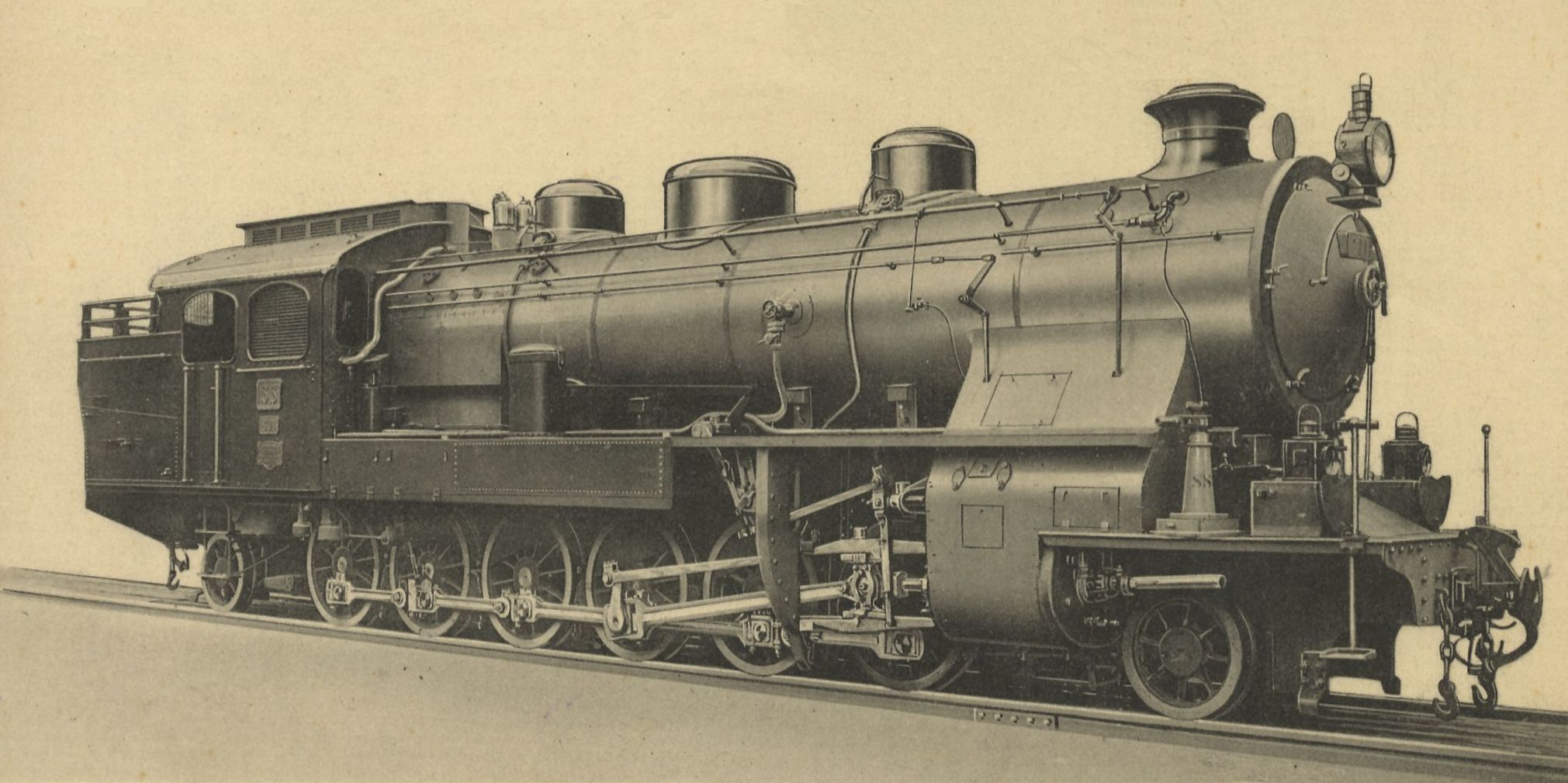
- Postcard depicting the 800 class, later class F10 locomotive of 1912
Type and origin
- Power type: Steam
- Designer: Hanomag
- Builder: Hanomag; Werkspoor
- Build date: 1912–1920
- Total produced: 28
Specifications
- Configuration
  - Whyte: 2-12-2T
  - UIC: 1′F1′ h2t
- Driver: 3rd
- Gauge: 1,067 mm (3 ft 6 in)
- Driver dia.: 1,102 mm (3 ft 7.4 in)
- Trailing dia.: 774 mm (2 ft 6.5 in)
- Carrying wheel diameter: 774 mm (2 ft 6.5 in)
- Wheelbase
  - Axle spacing (Asymmetrical): 1,250 mm (4 ft 1 in)
  - Engine: 9,000 mm (29 ft 6 in); 10,250 mm (33 ft 8 in)
  - Drivers: 5,000 mm (16 ft 5 in); 3,750 mm (12 ft 4 in) was fixed, with the leading and trailing drivers having some sideplay
- Length
  - Over couplers: 14,000 mm (45 ft 11 in)
  - Over headstocks: 13,080 mm (42 ft 11 in)
- Width: 2,700 mm (8 ft 10 in)
- Height: 3,750 mm (12 ft 4 in)
- Adhesive weight: 57,000 kg (126,000 lb)
- Empty weight: 57,600 kg (127,000 lb); 59,000 kg (130,000 lb)
- Service weight: 74,600 kg (164,500 lb)
- Fuel type: Coal
- Fuel capacity: 2.5 t (2.5 long tons; 2.8 short tons)
- Water cap.: 8.5 m^{3} (300 cu ft)
- Firebox
  - Type: Round-topped
  - Grate area: 2.6 m^{2} (28 sq ft)
- Boiler
  - Type: Single dome
  - Pitch: 2,450 mm (8 ft 0 in)
  - Diameter: 1,376 mm (4 ft 6.2 in)
  - Tube plates: 4,950 mm (16 ft 3 in)
  - Small tubes: 109 mm × 50 mm (4.3 in × 2.0 in)
  - Large tubes: 18 mm × 133 mm (0.71 in × 5.24 in)
- Boiler pressure: 12 atm (180 psi; 12 bar)
- Heating surface
  - Tubes and flues: 131.51 m^{2} (1,415.6 sq ft)
  - Total surface: 167.5 m^{2} (1,803 sq ft)
- Superheater
  - Heating area: 36 m^{2} (390 sq ft); 40 m^{2} (430 sq ft)
- Cylinders: 2
- Cylinder size: 540 mm × 510 mm (21 in × 20 in)
- Valve gear: Walschaerts/Heusinger
- Valve type: Piston
- Couplers: Centre-buffer chopper coupling (766 mm above railhead)
Performance figures
- Tractive effort: 140,000 kgf (1,400,000 N; 310,000 lbf)
Career
- Operators: Staatsspoorwegen (Dutch East Indian state railways); Djawatan Kereta Api (Indonesian State Railways)
- Class: 800 (SS); F10 (DKA)
- Number in class: 28
- Numbers: 801-823, H130-134
- Nicknames: Javanic
- Delivered: 1912–1920
- Preserved: 2
- Dimensions from, unless noted

The SS 800 class, later reclassified as the F10 class, were a class of 28 2-12-2T steam locomotives built by Hanomag and later Werkspoor for the Staatsspoorwegen, the state railway of the Dutch East Indies, presently Indonesia. They were one of very few twelve-coupled locomotives to be built.

Built between 1912 and 1920, the 800 class were designed to handle heavy traffic over mountainous terrain on the island of Java. Some were later transferred to Sumatra as traffic demands increased there, and the 800 class began to be displaced by newer locomotives from the 1920s. Reclassified as F10 during the Japanese occupation, they were withdrawn in the 1970s, and two have been preserved as static exhibits.

== Background ==
After 1900, the railways and its traffic saw expansion on the island of Java. Many sections of railway were steep and heavily graded, requiring powerful locomotives that also were able to efficiently negotiate tight curves. A variety of gauges were used, but the majority were laid to the gauge of 1,067 mm (3 ft 6 in). The SS 500/BB10 class were 0-4-4-2T Mallet locomotives, but, by then, lacked the strength to cope with increasingly heavy trains. A six-coupled Mallet, the SS 360/CC10 class, was introduced. These locomotives, despite being able to negotiate tight curves and handle heavy trains, proved cumbersome in maintenance, with leakage from the flexible steam pipes to the leading chassis.

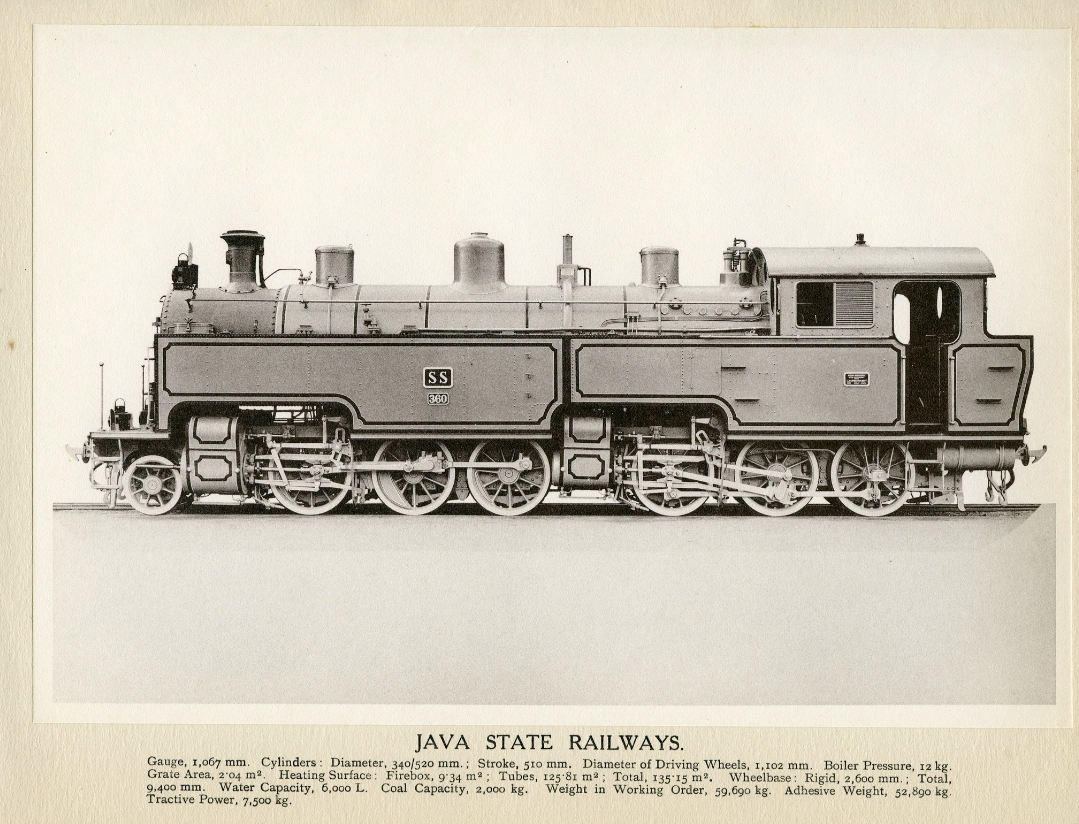
The preceding SS 360, CC10 class Mallet

There was a demand for a locomotive with as many driven axles as the Mallets, but without the complexity of articulation. Hanomag produced a design for a 2-12-2T tank locomotive, with the arrangement of the axles permitting negotiation of tight curves; the four central axles were rigid, and the leading and trailing coupled axles allowed some sideplay.

== Design ==
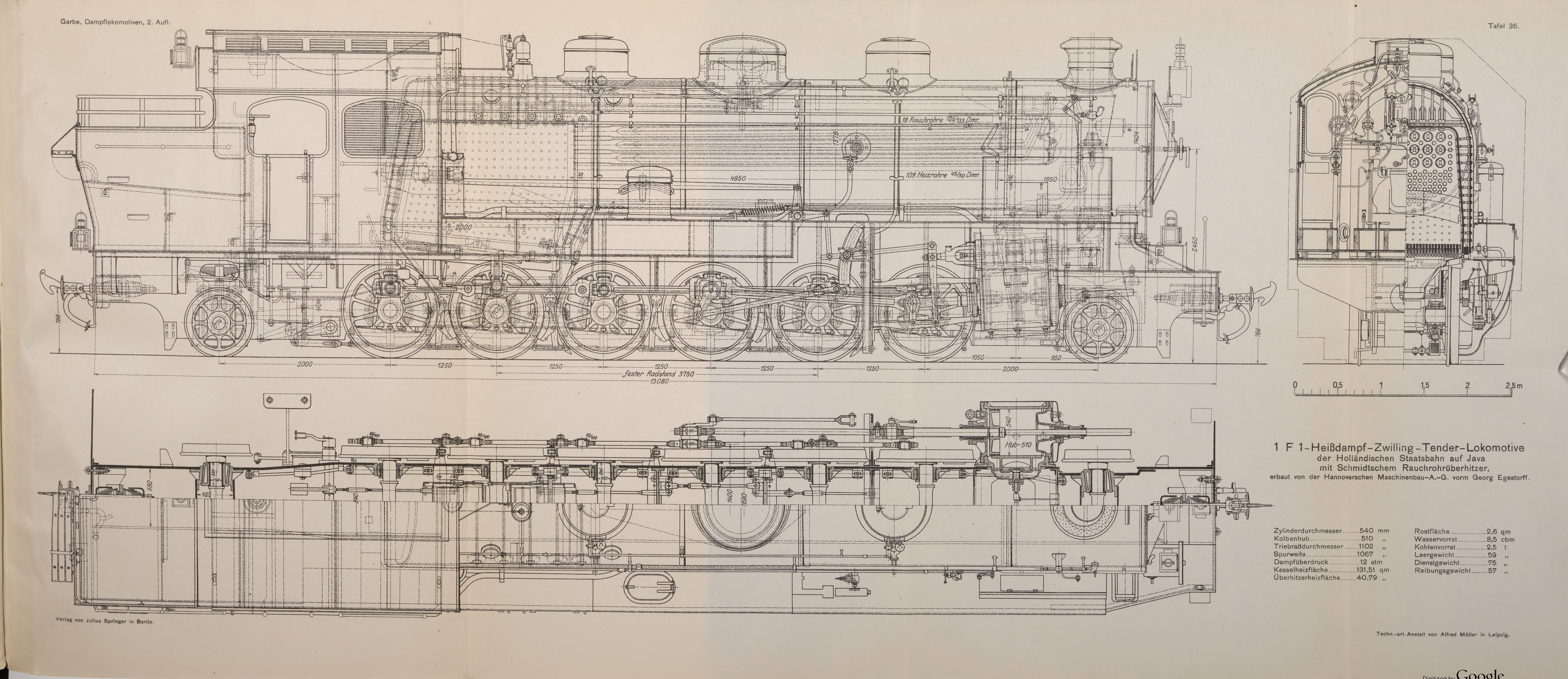
Hanomag original drawing of 1912

Apart from the unusual number of coupled axles (Note: The only other 12-coupled class to be built in larger numbers than this were the 44 members of the Württemberg K class.) and the overall large size for a narrow gauge locomotive, their construction was quite conventional, using the latest contemporary techniques of the year.

To permit negotiation of tight curves, the leading and trailing coupled axles were arranged as a form of Gölsdorf axle with linear sideplay. (Note: Gölsdorf's original pattern also made the centre axle free to move in the opposite direction.) The first and last coupling rods also had vertical pin hinges to allow sideways movement. Leading and trailing carrying axles were carried in Adams radial axle boxes. Although the sideplay allowed the locomotives to traverse a curve down to 140 m radius, the linear movement also led to rapid flange wear, (Note: Linear movement, rather than the radial movement of a pivoted truck, places the flanges of the wheel at an increasing angle to the corner of the rail, thus increasing wear.) and the curve restrictions had to be increased in service.

They were superheated, with Schmidt superheaters in 18 flues. Piston valves allowed the raised steam temperature of superheating without the lubrication problems that afflicted some locomotives of this era.

The chimney had the internal opening displaced forwards within the decorative outer casing, and a small snifting valve was hidden underneath it, behind the flue. In later years the locomotives were fitted with a plain 'stovepipe' chimney instead. To allow easy coasting down the long gradients, with the regulator shut, there was an unusual valve behind the cylinders under the driver's control that linked the two ends of the cylinder and so avoided any engine braking effect.

The boiler was already large and high-pitched, in consideration of the gauge, so for stability the side tanks were positioned as skirt tanks below the footplate level, and could almost be overlooked. A large rear tank was also provided below the coal bunker. Water was easily available in Java and the distance between watering points was short, so a large capacity was not required. Despite appearances, the class carried a third more water than the earlier Mallets.

In consideration of the hot climate, the cabs were spacious and the side windows were fitted with sliding louvred sun screens. There was also a large clerestory roof vent.

== Construction ==
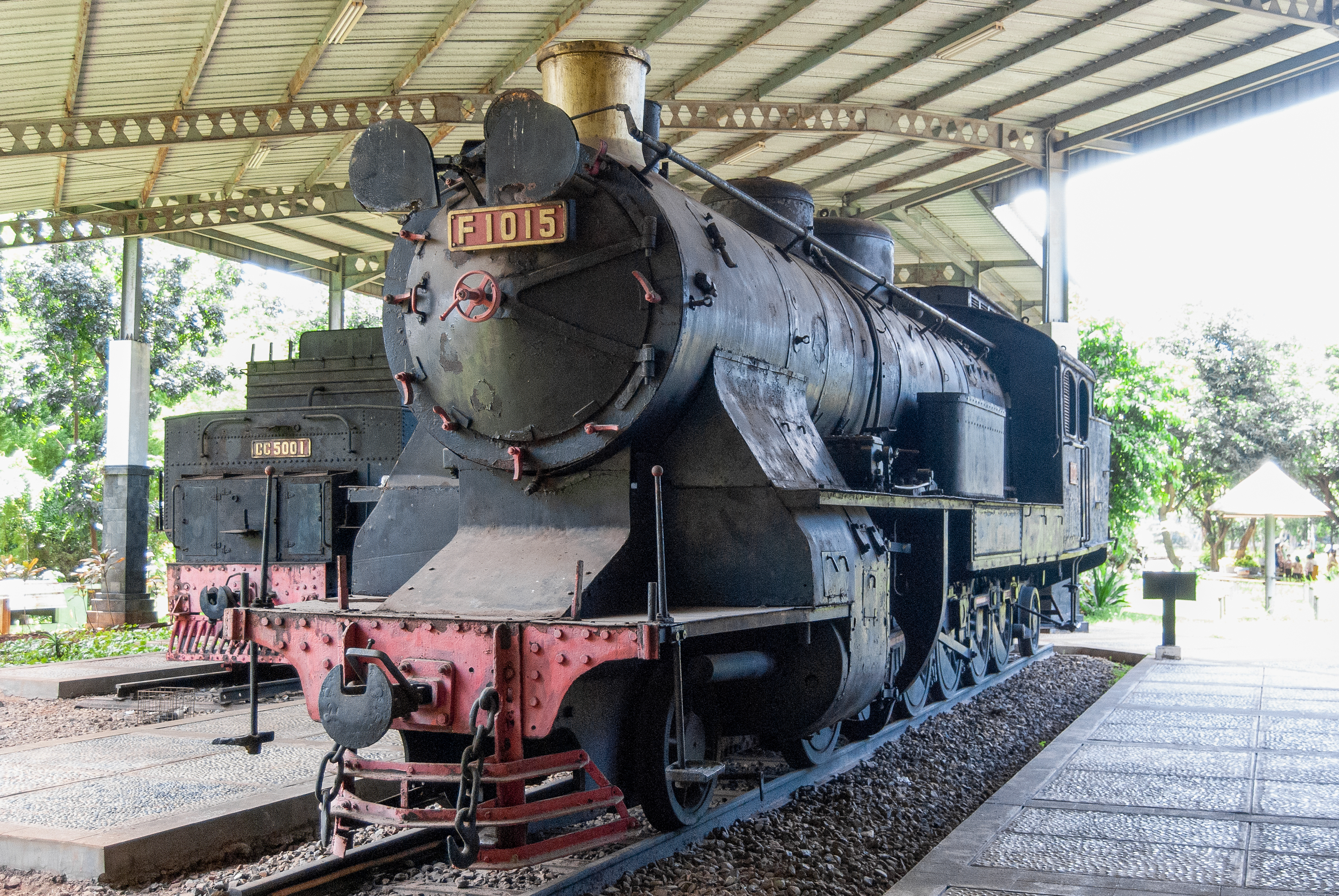
F1015 on static display at the Jakarta Transportation Museum

Running number	Number built	Renumbered		DKA running number	Year	Builder	Works number
SS 801	1			F1001	1912	Hanomag	6450
SS 802–810	9			F1002–10	1913	Hanomag	6813–6821
SS 811–816	6			F1011–16	1914–5	Hanomag	7362–7367
SS 817–819	3			F1017–19	1915	Werkspoor	372–374
SS 820–822	3	SSS H130–H132	SS 820–822	F1024–26	1915	Werkspoor	375–377
SS 820–823 (2nd)	4		SS 823 (3rd)–826	F1020–23	1917	Werkspoor	418–421
SSS H133–134	2		SS 827–828	F1027–28	1920	Hanomag	9353–9354
Total	28					Hanomag: 18 Werkspoor: 10	

The first of the class was ordered as one single prototype. A production batch, bringing the total to ten, followed shortly afterwards. Further batches were ordered at intervals afterwards. No important variations between the batches, or by the different builders, are recorded.

In reference to their size, the unique wheel arrangement, and to the contemporary RMS Titanic, they acquired the nickname 'Javanics'. This also gave rise to Javanic as a generic name for the wheel arrangement of the class, just as Atlantic and Pacific had already become established.

During the Great War, the Netherlands were neutral and continued to trade with Germany. Wartime restrictions meant that locomotives were not available from Hanomag, and so new ones were ordered from Werkspoor instead. After the war, in 1920, a last batch were obtained, this time again from Hanomag.

== Service history ==
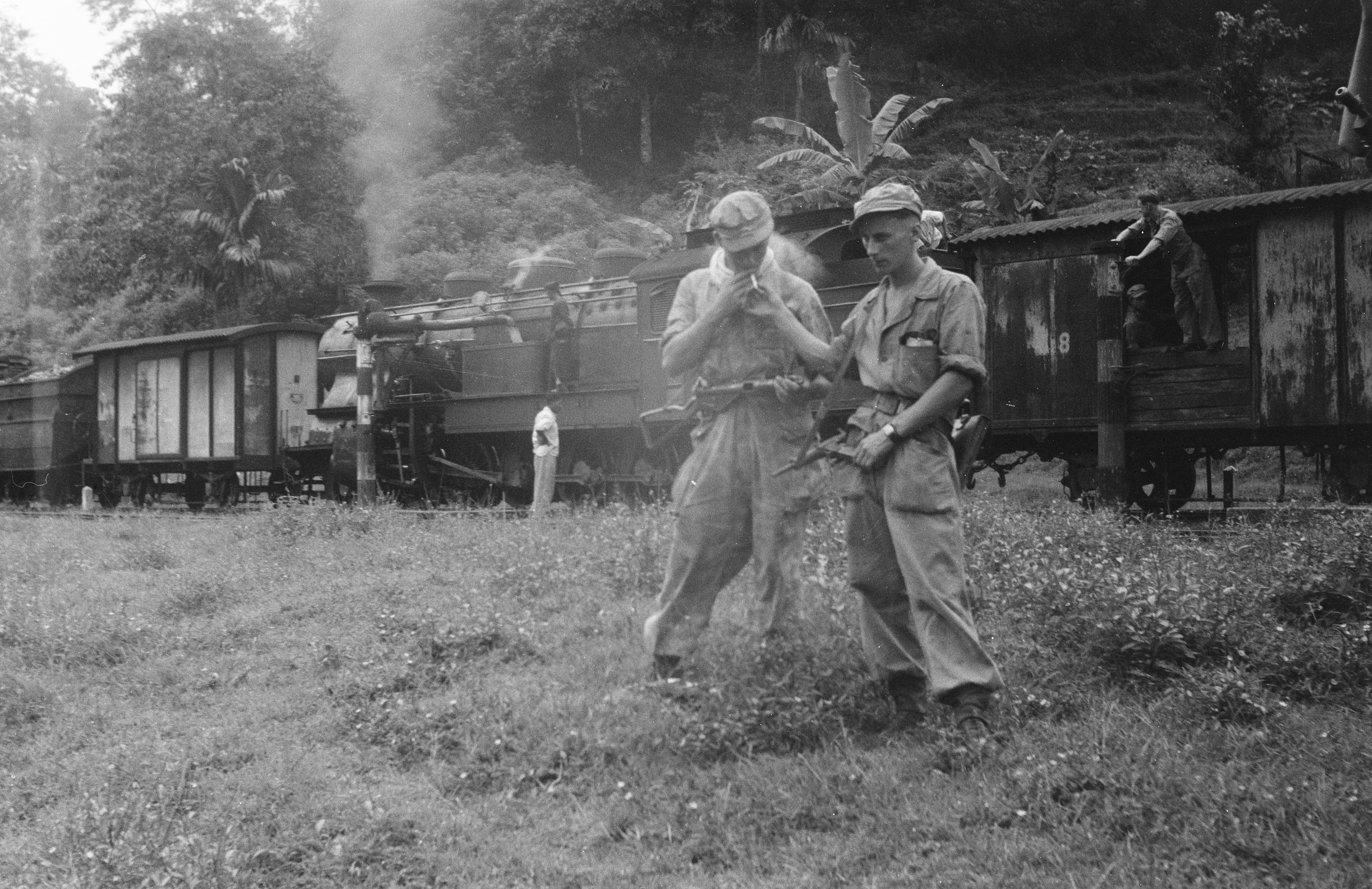
A coal train from the Ombilin Coal Mine in Sawah Loento, bound for the power station, immediately after the Sawah Loento-Solok section was repaired, January 1949, during the Indonesian War of Independence.

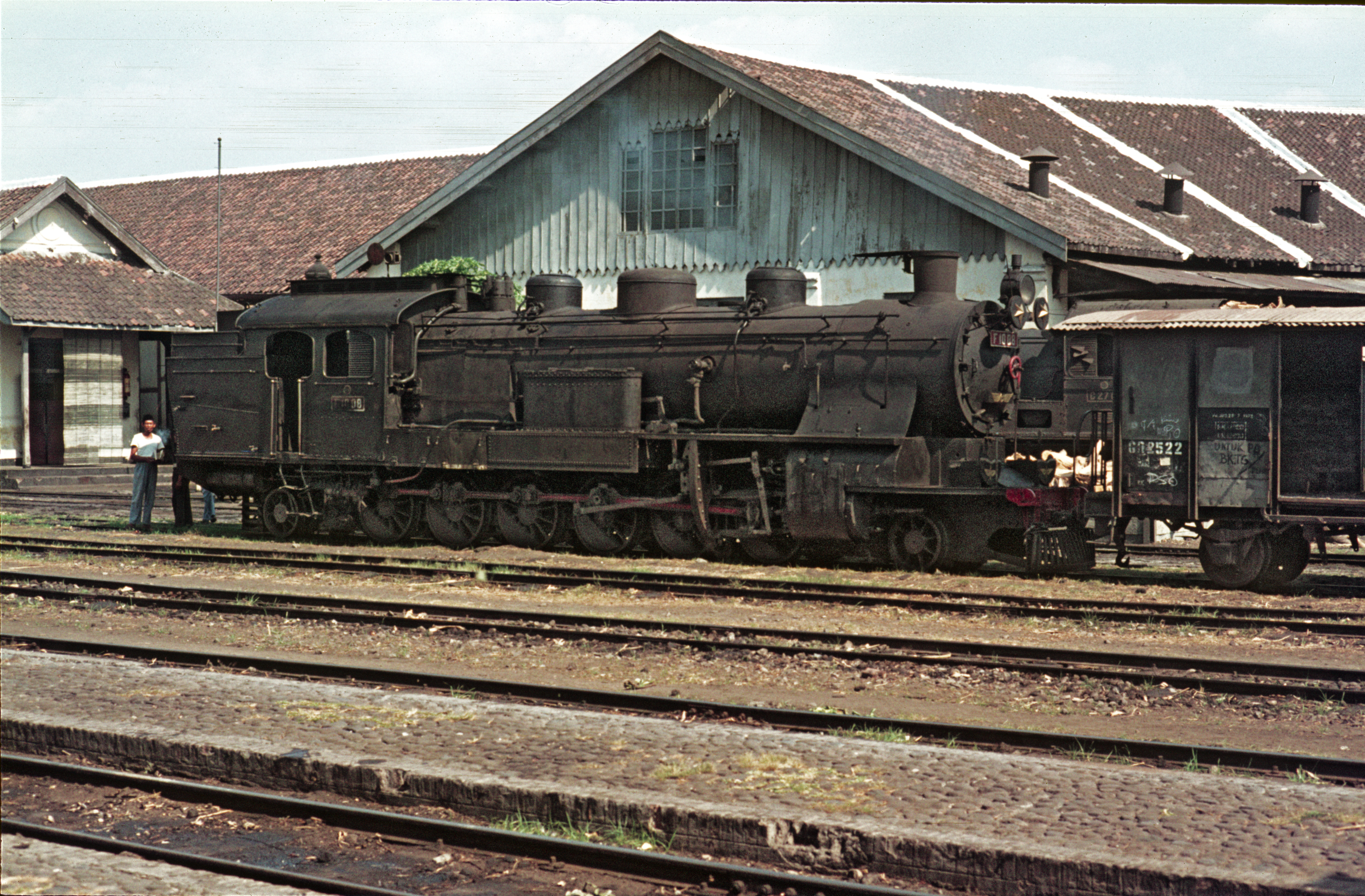
F10 08, Kertosono, East Java, August 1972

Initially Staatsspoorwegen used the locomotives in the mountainous Parahyangan (Preanger) region of West Java, based at Bandung running shed. Railways in the Dutch East Indies at this time consisted of several isolated systems, separated by long distances, and of several different gauges. The locomotives were designed for a minimum curve radius of around 150 m and although they coped with this, flange wear was excessive. Over their careers, and once the SS 1600/DKA CC50 Mallets were despatched in service, the 800s were gradually transferred to sections with gentler curves.

Around 1920, coal mining around Ombilin in West Sumatra was becoming important. Five of the SS 800 locomotives were moved there, transferred to the SSS (Staatsspoorwegen ter Sumatra's Westkust) and renumbered as H130–H134. Three were locomotives from Java, two were newly built in 1920 and may have been delivered there directly from Hanomag.

After the Japanese occupation of the Dutch East Indies during the Second World War and the proclamation of independence in 1945, Djawatan Kereta Api ('Indonesian State Railways') was formed on 28 September 1945. A locomotive reclassification scheme had been implemented, (Note: Based on the Japanese locomotive classification scheme dated 1928.) with the class being designated as F10, with running numbers F1001-F1028. The F denoted a locomotive with six driving axles. After the Indonesian War of Independence ended in 1949, some reorganising and renaming of the state railway occurred, but this did not affect the F10 class.

In their final years, the F10s were also found in East Java, such as on the Malang–Blitar and Jember–Klakah–Lumajang sections, working local trains of mixed passengers and goods.

=== Withdrawal ===
All steam in Indonesia was withdrawn amidst dieselisation in the 1970s. Locomotives were scrapped and cut up at their old running sheds. In West Sumatra, a number of scrapped F10s were seen in January 1981, and F1024 was identified as derelict at Padang Works, with F1028 derelict at Solok at the same time.

== Preservation ==
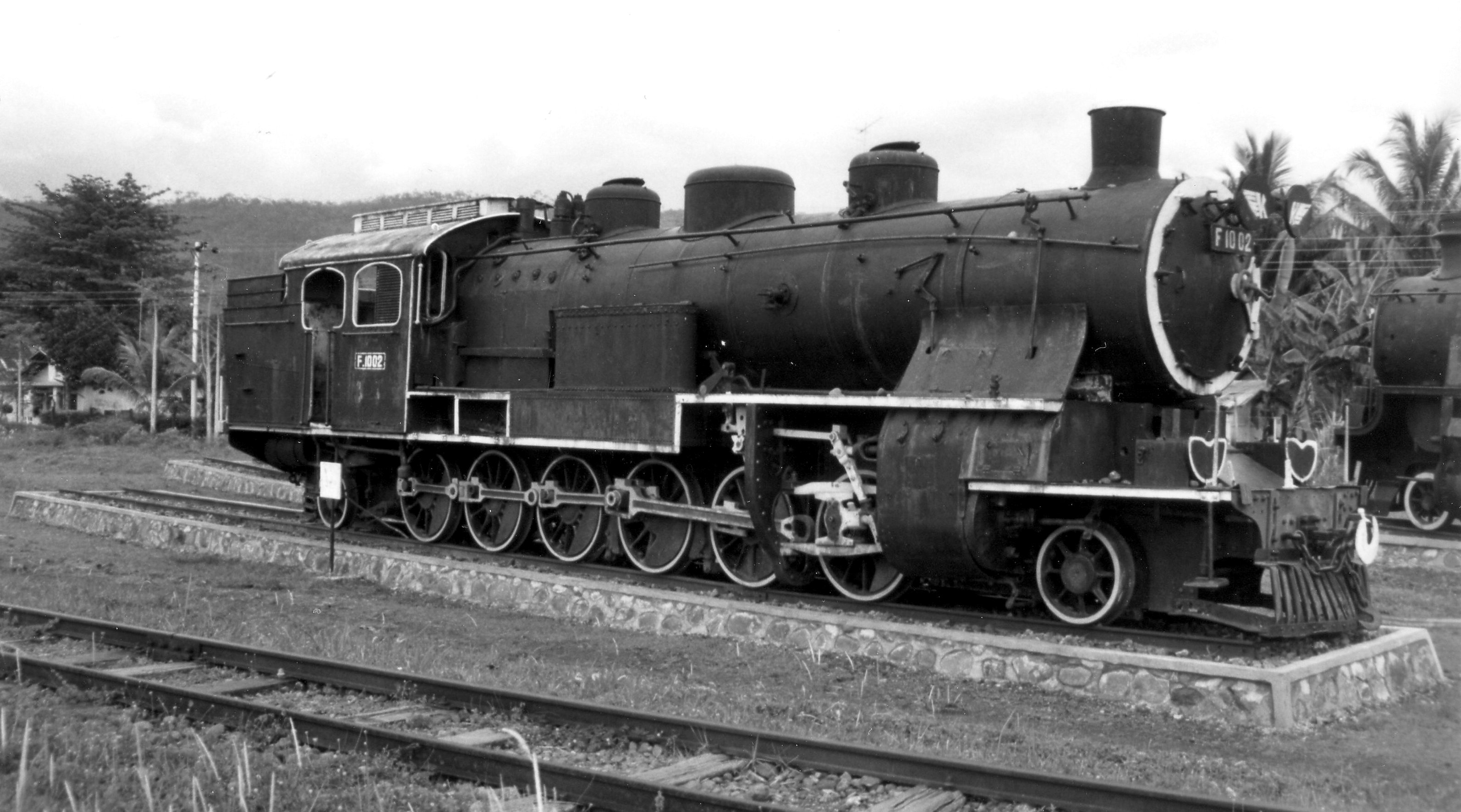
F1002 at Indonesian Railways Museum at Ambarawa, September 1989

Two are preserved in Java in static condition:

- F1002 – the Ambarawa Railway Museum, Ambarawa
- F1015 – the Transportation Museum in Taman Mini Indonesia Indah, Cipayung

Some sources (Note: See id:Lokomotif F10) claim that in 1986, F1015 was taken to the transport-themed Expo 86 and 'SteamExpo 86' in Vancouver, Canada, as part of the Indonesian exhibition; this cannot be confirmed. F1015 had been restored at Padang works in 1985.

== See also ==
- History of railways in Indonesia
- DKA class E10
