= 2-12-2 =

Locomotive wheel arrangement

Under the Whyte notation for the classification of steam locomotives, 2-12-2 represents the wheel arrangement of two leading wheels on one axle (usually in a leading truck), twelve powered and coupled driving wheels on six axles, and two trailing wheels on one axle (usually in a trailing truck).

== Equivalent classifications ==
Other equivalent classifications are:

- UIC classification: 1′F1′ (also known as German classification and Italian classification)
- French classification: 161
- Turkish classification: 68
- Swiss classification: 6/8

== Use ==
=== Austria ===
The Deutsche Reichsbahn and later the Austrian Federal Railways operated two Class 97.4 2-12-2T tank locomotives, both built in 1941.

=== Indonesia ===
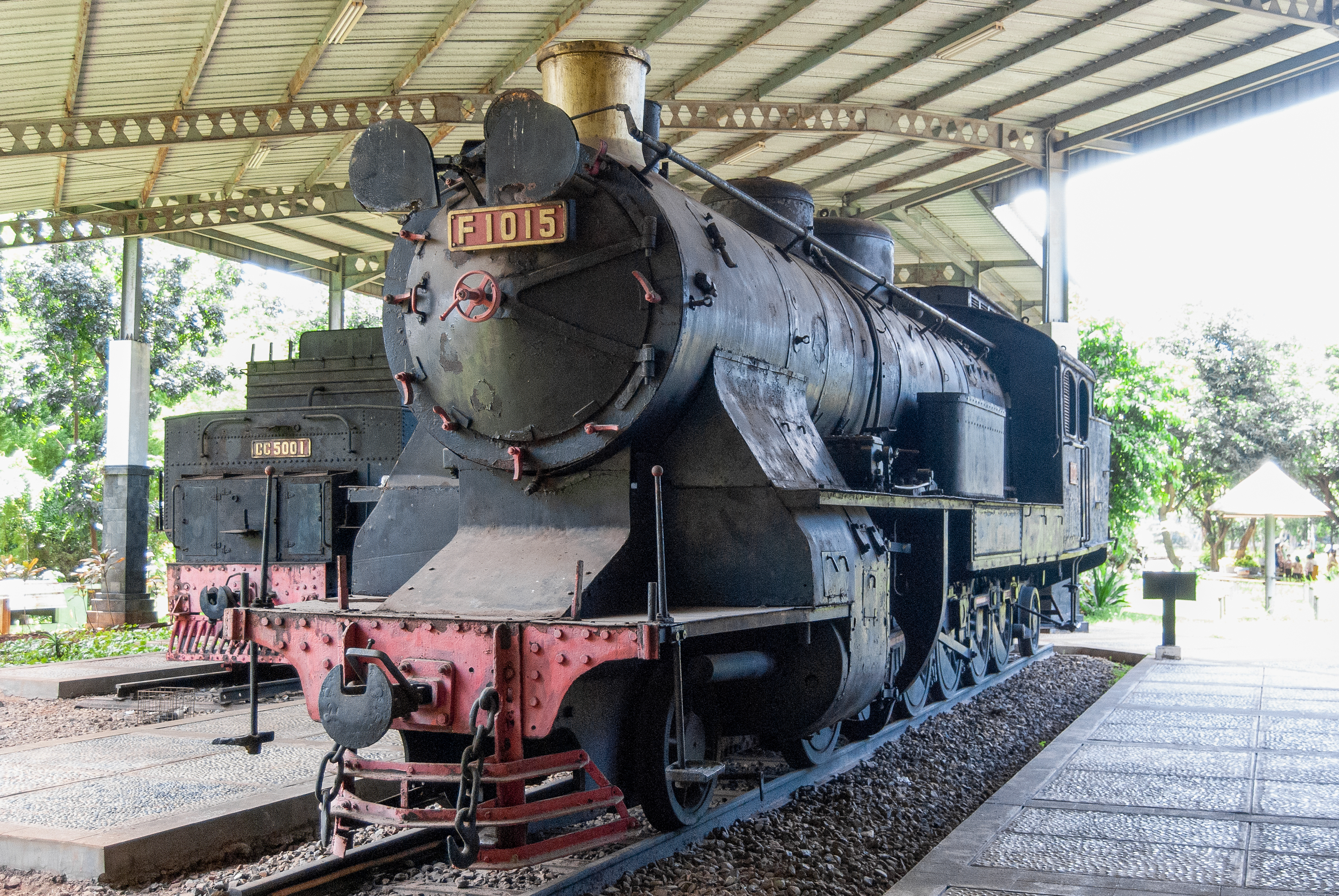
An Indonesian F10 locomotive

Hanomag and Werkspoor built a cumulative total of 28 JSS 800, came in 1912-1920. The SS 800s (2-12-2Ts or 1′F1′ h2t in UIC notation) also known as Javanic had been used by the Staatsspoorwegen in freight service in Java and Sumatra, Dutch East Indies, now Indonesia. They were assigned the railroad numbers 801-823 and H130-134. After Indonesian Independence, they were renumbered as F1001-F1026 by Indonesian State Railways.
