= Padalarang, West Bandung =

District in West Bandung Regency, Indonesia

Padalarang
- District
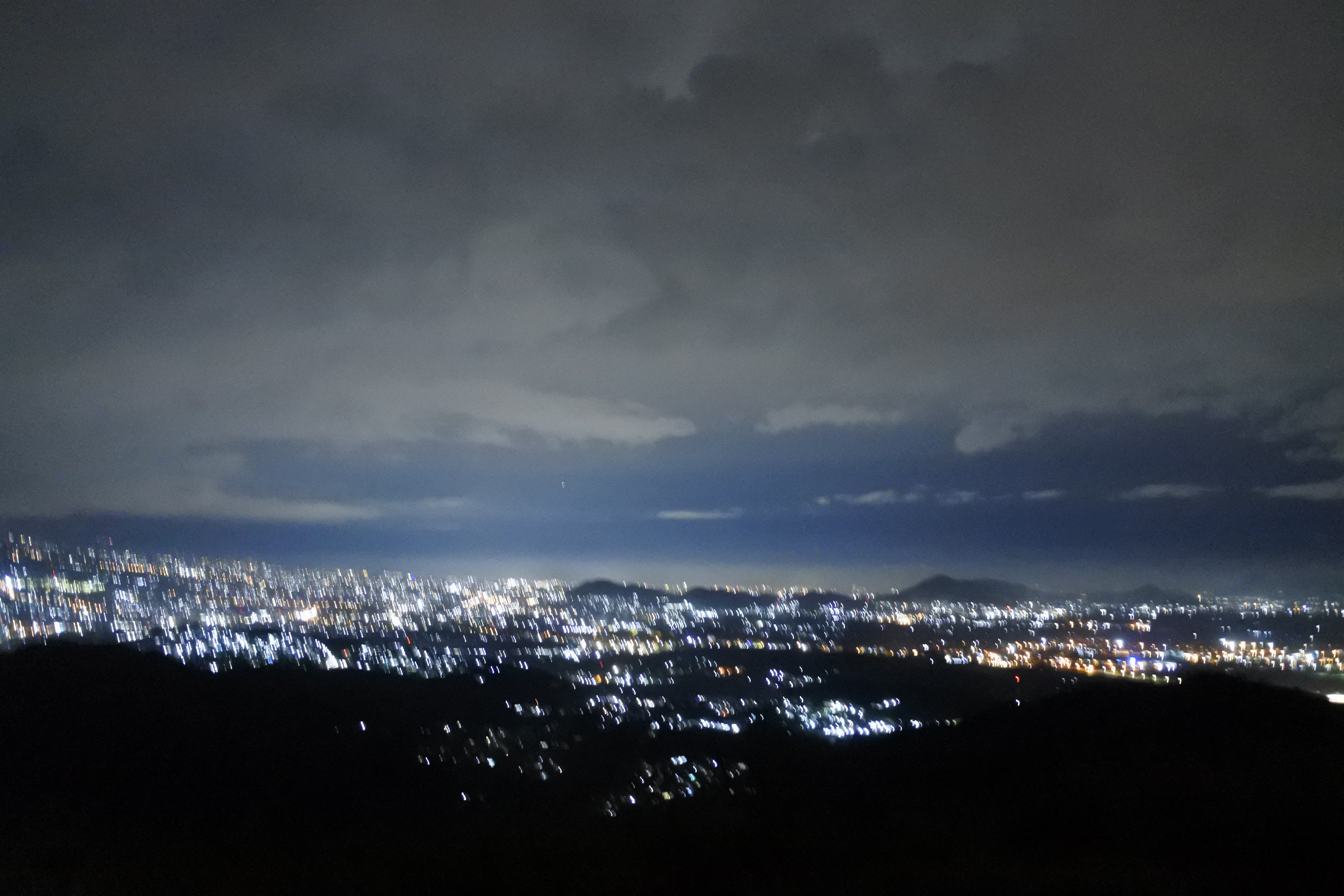
- Skyline of Padalarang at night, taken from Flag Mountain (Gunung Bendera).

- Location in Java and Indonesia Padalarang (Indonesia)
- Coordinates: 6°50′37″S 107°28′40″E
- Country: Indonesia
- Province: West Java
- Regency: West Bandung Regency

Area
  - Total: 51.48 km^{2} (19.88 sq mi)

Population (mid 2024 estimate)
  - Total: 193,114
  - Density: 3,751/km^{2} (9,716/sq mi)
- Time zone: UTC+7 (UTC+7 (Western Indonesia Time))
- Website: www.bandungbaratkab.go.id

Padalarang is an administrative district (kecamatan) in West Bandung Regency, West Java Province of Indonesia. It covers a land area of 51.48 km^{2}, and had a population of 155,534 at the 2010 Census and 181,359 at the 2020 Census; the latest official estimate as at mid 2024 was 190,209.

== Subdivision ==
Padalarang District is divided into ten administrative villages (desa), all sharing the post code of 40553. Their areas and the estimated populations as at mid 2024, are set out below:

Kode Wilayah	Name of Desa	Area in km^{2}	Population mid 2024 estimate
32.17.08.2010	Laksanamekar	4.34	19,225
32.17.08.2003	Cimerang	5.11	9,444
32.17.08.2008	Cipendeuy	5.04	14,569
32.17.08.2007	Kertajaya	4.39	18,522
32.17.08.2009	Jayamekar	5.77	23,092
32.17.08.2002	Padalarang (village)	5.11	36,715
32.17.08.2001	Kertamulya	2.48	22,402
32.17.08.2006	Ciburuy	5.66	20,032
32.17.08.2005	Tagogapu	5.78	11,900
32.17.08.2004	Campakamekar	7.80	14,308
32.17.08	Totals	51.48	190,209

Laksanamekar desa is located to the southeast of the other villages, while Tagogapu and Campakamekar desa are situated in the far north of the district.

== Local attractions ==
- Situ Ciburuy
- Kota Baru Parahyangan
- Cimeta railway bridge

== Toll road access ==
KM	Toll Road	Destination
122	Purbaleunyi Toll Road	Padalarang, Sukabumi, Cianjur

== See also ==
- West Bandung Regency
- Bandung Metropolitan Area
