= Heritage unit =

Locomotive painted in an honorary paint scheme

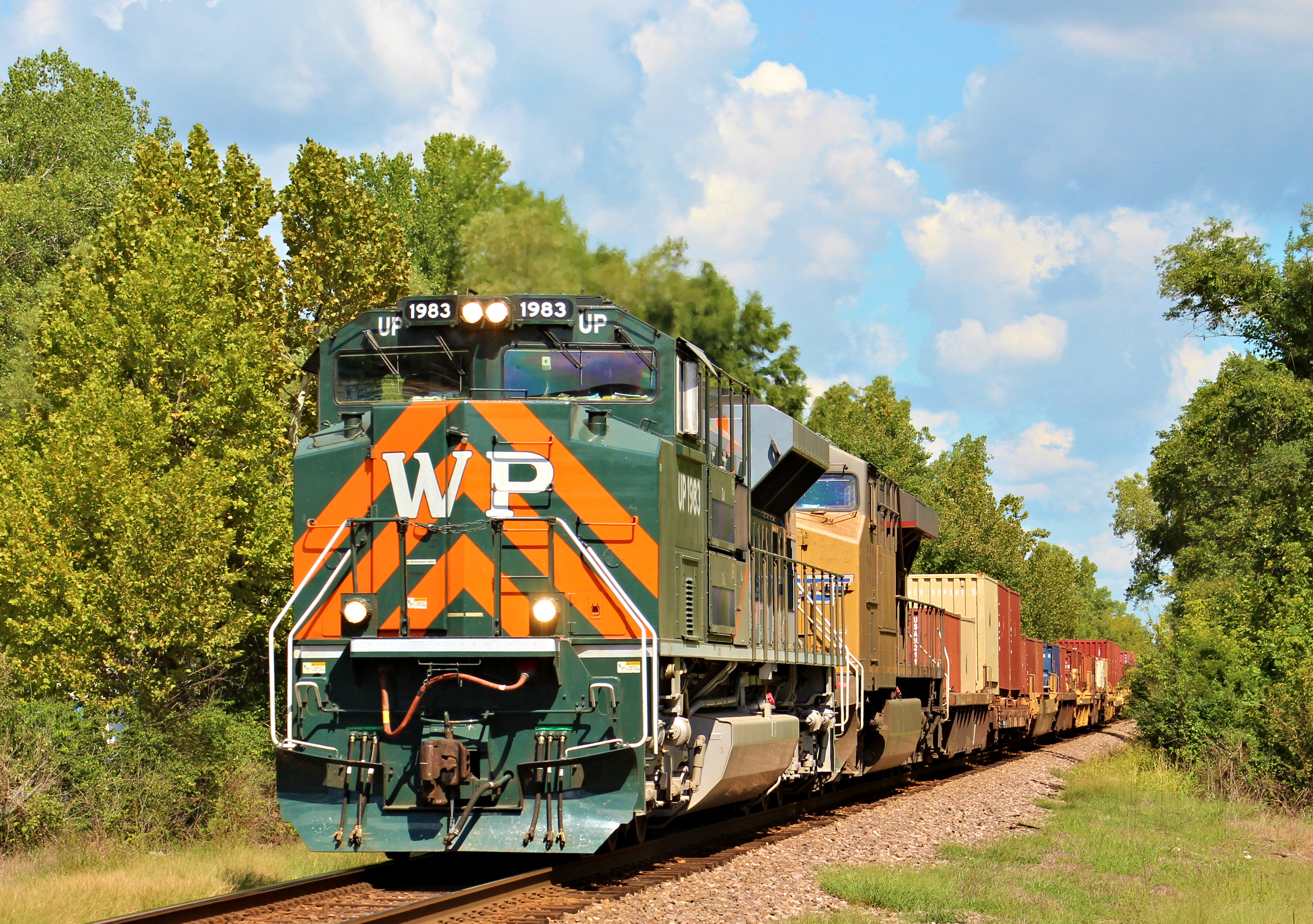
UP 1983 is an EMD SD70ACe owned by the Union Pacific Railroad and painted in the Western Pacific Railroad scheme, one of the six railroads acquired by Union Pacific

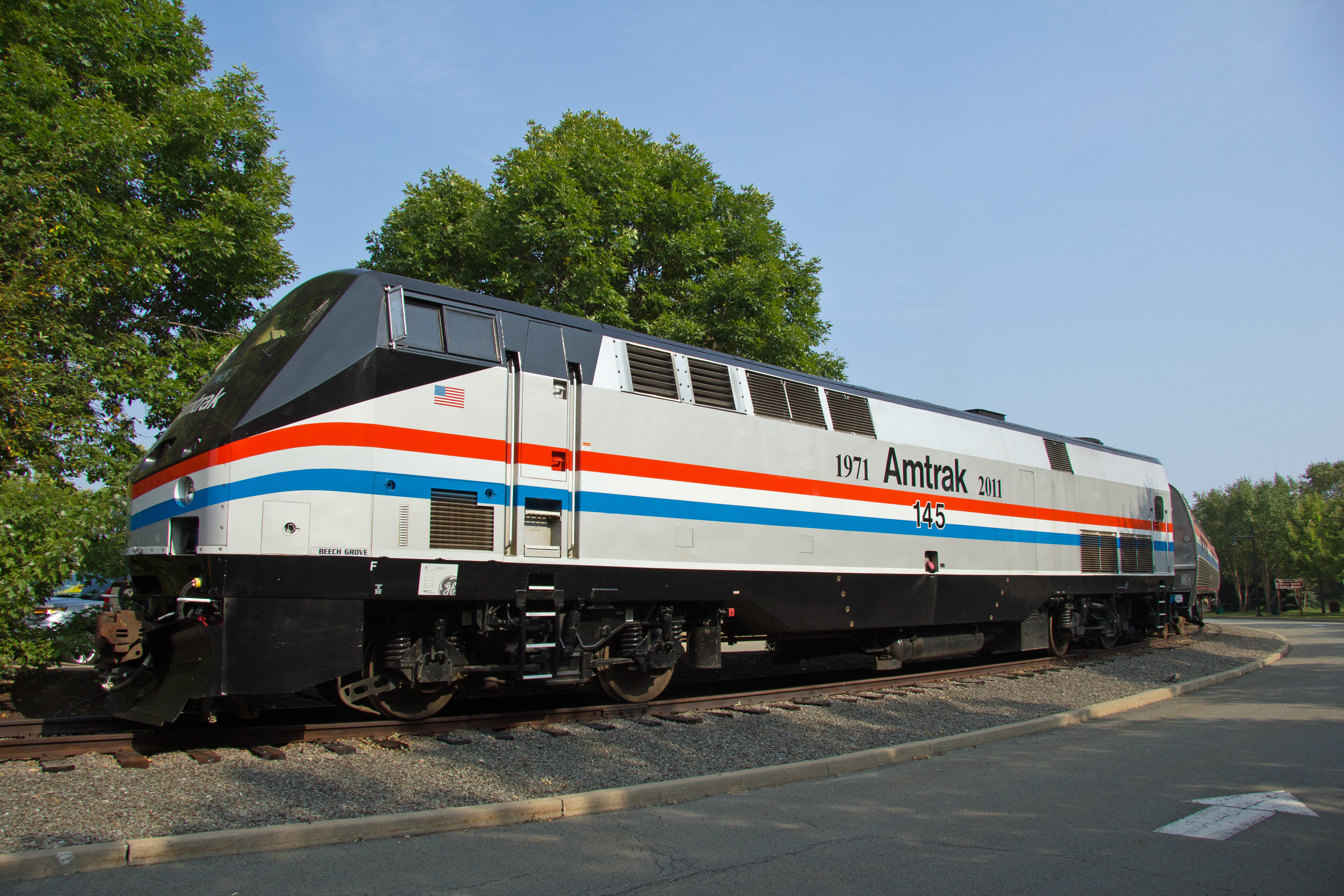
Amtrak GE P42DC locomotive #145, which is painted in Amtrak's Phase III scheme, and is one of 16 Amtrak heritage units

A heritage unit or commemorative locomotive is a railroad locomotive painted in an honorary paint scheme; usually the paint scheme is that of a now-defunct railroad that merged with or was acquired by the locomotive's owner.

== Among North American railroads ==
Heritage units are popular among North American railroads. As of 2023, most Class I railroads have official heritage units, the only exception being the BNSF Railway. (Note: Although BNSF released several commemorative celebrating their 25th Anniversary, which featured logos of predecessor railroads, these are not considered as heritage units.)

The Union Pacific Railroad painted six EMD SD70ACes in stylized paint schemes of six of its predecessors between 2005 and 2006. The Norfolk Southern Corporation did the same in 2012 with 20 of its locomotives for its 30th Railroad Anniversary. 10 of them are EMD SD70ACes, while the others are GE ES44AC units. For its 40th anniversary in 2011, Amtrak painted four GE P42DCs, a P40DC, and an NPCU into its older paint schemes. Six more locomotives, a Siemens ALC-42 Charger and five P42DCs, were painted for its 50th anniversary in 2021.

In 2019, the Canadian Pacific Railway, now Canadian Pacific Kansas City, painted ten EMD SD70ACU units CP 7010-7019 in a maroon and gray paint scheme with a different font style. In late 2020, the Canadian National Railway revealed five new heritage units in addition to two sets of yard slugs (CN 7600, CN 600, painted in CNs yellow and green scheme), and CN 7601, and 601m painted in the Illinois Central deathstar scheme, after they had been first spotted a month earlier. These included four GE ET44ACs and one EMD SD70M-2. They were painted in honor of the 25th anniversary of CN's initial public offering. Beginning in 2023, CSX revealed its first of many heritage units, ES44AH 1827 with a Baltimore & Ohio paint scheme.

== List of heritage units ==
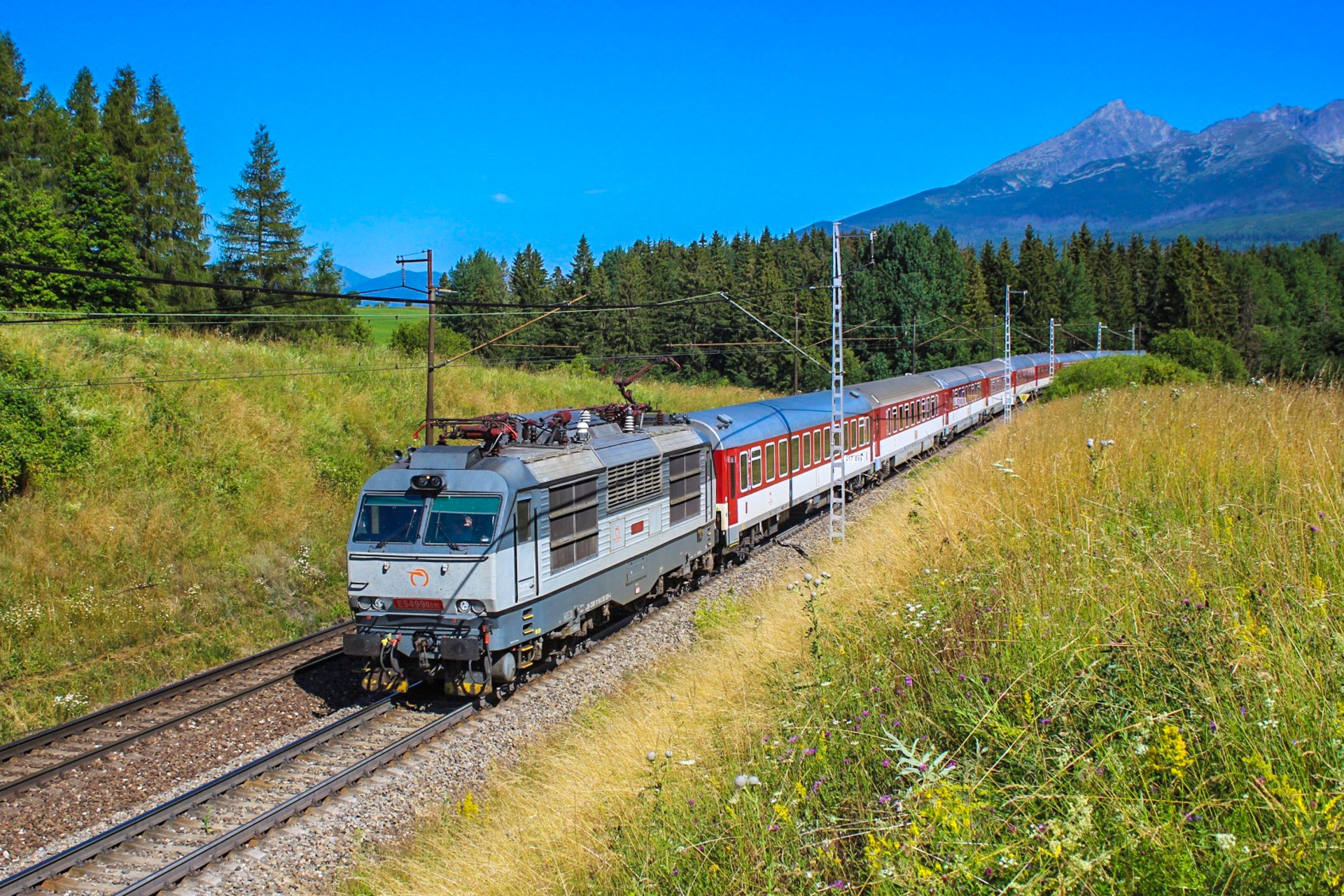
ES 499.0001, actual running number 350 001-4, of the Slovakian Railways (ZSSK) in its factory paint scheme. Railway companies in Europe have also taken up this practice.

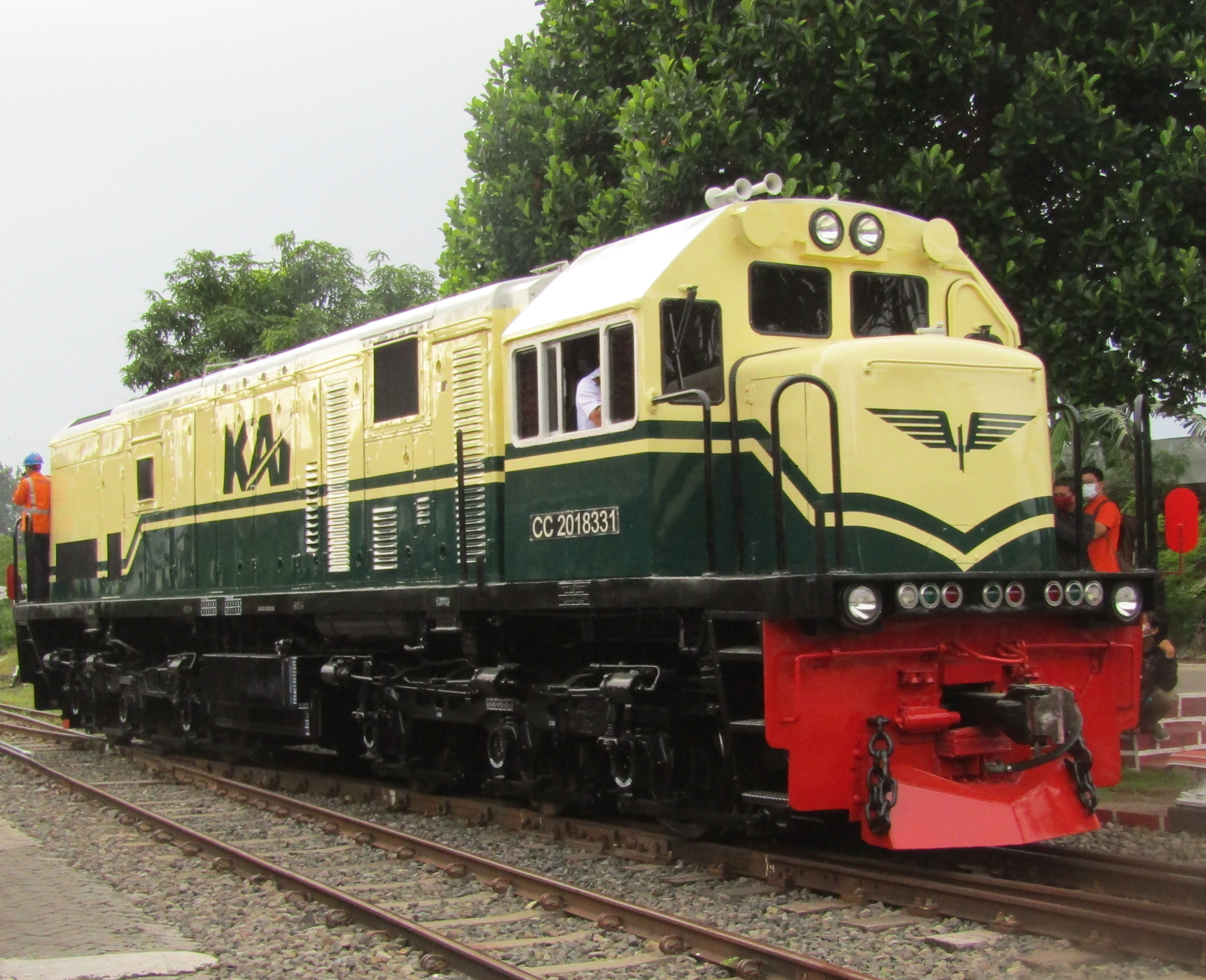
CC 201 83 31 of the Kereta Api Indonesia (formerly CC 201 69), the first of the national railway's main line locomotive to use honorary paint scheme, sporting the railway's 1953-1991 paint scheme since 2021

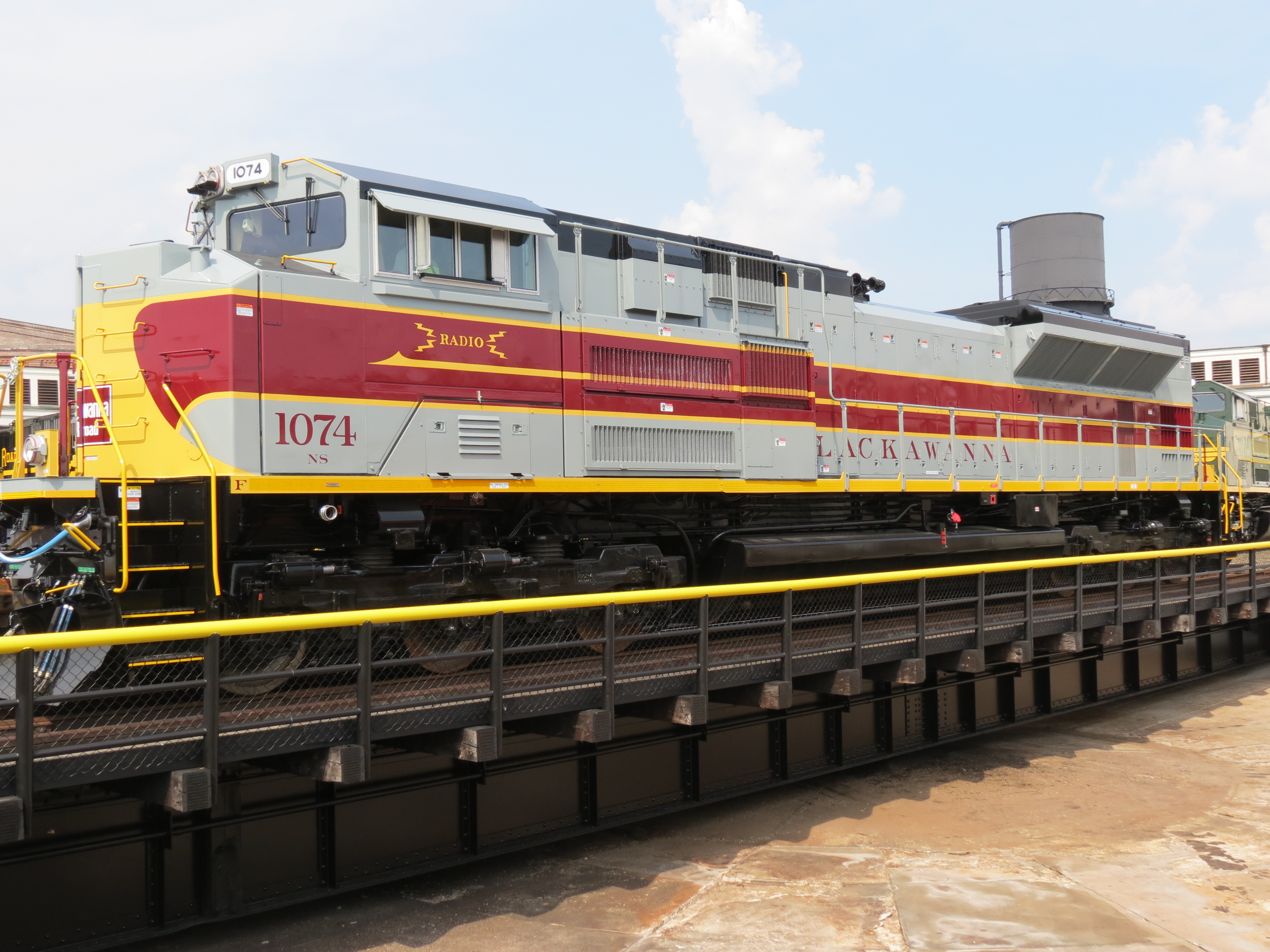
NS 1074 is an EMD SD70ACe owned by the Norfolk Southern Railway, painted in the Lackawanna scheme, one of the 22 railroads acquired by it

SEPTA Silverliner IV 293, which is painted in a Reading Railroad heritage unit scheme

Below is a list of heritage units in active service by various railroads.

Railroad	Road number	Paint scheme	Locomotive model
Alaska Railroad	4328	F-Unit Scheme	EMD SD70MAC
Amtrak	130	Phase II	GE P42DC
Amtrak	145	Phase III	GE P42DC
Amtrak	160 (Note: 160 has 50th Anniversary markings)	Dash 8 Phase III "Pepsi Can"	GE P42DC
Amtrak	164	Phase IV	GE P42DC
Amtrak	90406 (formerly #406)	Phase III	EMD NPCU (former EMD F40PH)
Amtrak	301 (Note: 301 has 50th Anniversary markings)	"Day 1" livery	Siemens ALC-42
Ann Arbor (Watco)	3879	Ann Arbor	EMD GP38
Berkshire and Eastern	7879	G&W "Whisker Stripes"	GE C40-8W
California Northern	2403	G&W "Whisker Stripes"	KLW SE24B
Canadian National	600	Classic CN Green	EMD GY430A (slug)
Canadian National	601	Illinois Central	EMD GY430A (slug)
Canadian National	3008	Illinois Central	GE ET44AC
Canadian National	3023	Elgin, Joliet & Eastern	GE ET44AC
Canadian National	3069	Wisconsin Central	GE ET44AC
Canadian National	3115	BC Rail	GE ET44AC
Canadian National	7600	Classic CN Green	EMD GP40-3
Canadian National	7601	Illinois Central	EMD GP40-3
Canadian National	8952	Grand Trunk Western	EMD SD70M-2
Canadian Pacific Kansas City	3084	CP Tuscan red and grey (script writing) (Note: 7011 wrecked in a derailment on April 15, 2023.)	EMD GP38-2
Canadian Pacific Kansas City	CP 7010,7012–7014	CP Tuscan red and grey (script writing)	EMD SD70ACU
Canadian Pacific Kansas City	CP 7015–7019	CP Tuscan red and grey (block writing)	EMD SD70ACU
Carolina Coastal	1501	Norfolk Southern (1942–1982)	EMD GP15-1
Chicago, Fort Wayne and Eastern	4032	G&W "Whisker Stripes"	GE C40-8W
Chicago, Fort Wayne and Eastern	4034	G&W "Whisker Stripes"	GE C40-8W
Cincinnati Eastern	2301	Illinois Terminal	EMD SD40-2
CSX	HLS1	Chessie System & Chesapeake & Ohio	EMD SD45-2 (Load Test Unit)
CSX	1-3	Baltimore & Ohio	EMD F40PH-2
CSX	1827	Baltimore & Ohio	GE ES44AH
CSX	1834	Georgia	GE ES44AH
CSX	1836	RF&P	GE ES44AH
CSX	1850	Louisville & Nashville	GE ES44AH
CSX	1851	NC&StL	GE ES44AH
CSX	1852	Western Maryland	GE ES44AH
CSX	1853	New York Central	GE ES44AH
CSX	1869	Chesapeake & Ohio	GE ES44AH
CSX	1871	Atlantic Coast Line	GE ES44AH
CSX	1875	Pittsburgh & Lake Erie	GE ES44AH
CSX	1877	C&EI	GE ES44AH
CSX	1897	Monon	GE ES44AH
CSX	1899	Pere Marquette	GE ES44AH
CSX	1900	Seaboard Air Line	GE ES44AH
CSX	1902	Clinchfield	GE ES44AH
CSX	1967	Seaboard Coast Line	GE ES44AH
CSX	1972	Family Lines System	GE ES44AH
CSX	1973	Chessie System	GE ES44AH
CSX	1976	Conrail	GE ES44AH
CSX	1981	Pan Am	GE ES44AH
CSX	1982	Seaboard System	GE ES44AH
Delaware-Lackawanna Railroad	4068	Delaware and Hudson	ALCo RS-3
Delaware-Lackawanna Railroad	2452	Erie Lackawanna	ALCO C425
Delaware-Lackawanna Railroad	2461	Erie Lackawanna	ALCO C425
East Midlands Railway	43102	InterCity (British Rail)	British Rail Class 43
Genesee & Wyoming	125	G&W "Whisker Stripes"	EMD GP38-2
Genesee & Wyoming	1899	G&W "Whisker Stripes"	GE C44-9W
Genesee & Wyoming	4055	G&W "Whisker Stripes"	GE C40-8W
Georgia Central	543	G&W "Whisker Stripes"	GE B32-8
GB Railfreight	66789	BR "Large Logo" blue	British Rail Class 66
GB Railfreight	66793	Trainload Freight Construction	British Rail Class 66
GB Railfreight	69002	BR "Large Logo" blue	British Rail Class 69
GB Railfreight	69004	Railway Technical Centre blue and red livery	British Rail Class 69
GB Railfreight	69005	BR Green with half-height yellow warning ends	British Rail Class 69
GB Railfreight	69007	BR Corporate blue	British Rail Class 69
GB Railfreight	69009	BR Maroon with white cabs	British Rail Class 69
GB Railfreight	69012	Two tone BR Green	British Rail Class 69
GB Railfreight	73128	Network SouthEast	British Rail Class 73
Green Mountain Railroad	405	Rutland Railroad	ALCO RS-1
Huron and Eastern	3865	G&W "Whisker Stripes"	EMD GP38-2
Huron and Eastern	3866	G&W "Whisker Stripes"	EMD GP38-2
Indiana and Ohio	4078	G&W "Whisker Stripes"	GE C40-8W
Indiana and Ohio	4091	G&W "Whisker Stripes"	GE C40-8W
Iowa Interstate	513	Rock Island	GE ES44AC
Iowa Interstate	516	Rock Island	GE ES44AC
Kereta Api Indonesia	CC201 83 31	DKA cream & green 1953-1991 scheme	GE U18C
Kereta Api Indonesia	CC201 83 34	DKA cream & green 1953-1991 scheme	GE U18C
Kereta Api Indonesia	CC201 92 01	DKA cream & green 1953-1991 scheme	GE U18C
Kereta Api Indonesia	CC201 92 06	Perumka white one-off 1997 scheme	GE U18C
Kereta Api Indonesia	CC201 83 46	Perumka red & blue 1991-2007 scheme	GE U18C
Kereta Api Indonesia	CC201 83 48	Perumka red & blue 1991-2007 scheme	GE U18C
Kereta Api Indonesia	CC201 89 12	Perumka red & blue 1991-2007 scheme	GE U18C
Kereta Api Indonesia	CC201 89 15	Perumka red & blue 1991-2007 scheme	GE U18C
Kereta Api Indonesia	CC201 93 01	Perumka red & blue 1991-2007 scheme	GE U18C
Kereta Api Indonesia	CC202 90 02	DKA cream & green 1953-1991 scheme	EMD G26
Kereta Api Indonesia	CC202 08 07	DKA cream & green 1953-1991 scheme	EMD G26
Kereta Api Indonesia	CC203 95 01	DKA cream & green 1953-1991 scheme	GE U20C
Kereta Api Indonesia	CC203 02 03	Perumka white with blue stripe prototype 1995 scheme	GE U20C
Kereta Api Indonesia	CC204 03 01	Perumka white with blue stripe 1995-2012 scheme	GE C18mmi
Kereta Api Indonesia	CC206 13 25	DKA cream & green 1953-1991 scheme	GE CM20EMP
Kereta Api Indonesia	CC206 16 02	Perumka red & blue 1991-2007 scheme	GE CM20EMP
Lake State Railway	6437	Pere Marquette	EMD SD70M
Locomotive Services Limited	37140	BR Blue	British Rail Class 37
Locomotive Services Limited	37401	BR "Large Logo" Blue	British Rail Class 37
Locomotive Services Limited	37409	ScotRail	British Rail Class 37
Locomotive Services Limited	D6817	BR Green	British Rail Class 37
Locomotive Services Limited	D6851	BR Green	British Rail Class 37
Locomotive Services Limited	43046	Midland Pullman	British Rail Class 43
Locomotive Services Limited	43047	Midland Pullman	British Rail Class 43
Locomotive Services Limited	43049	Midland Pullman	British Rail Class 43
Locomotive Services Limited	43050	Midland Pullman	British Rail Class 43
Locomotive Services Limited	43055	Midland Pullman	British Rail Class 43
Locomotive Services Limited	43058	Midland Pullman	British Rail Class 43
Locomotive Services Limited	43059	Midland Pullman	British Rail Class 43
Locomotive Services Limited	D1944	Two-tone BR Green	British Rail Class 47
Locomotive Services Limited	47593	BR "Large Logo" Blue	British Rail Class 47
Locomotive Services Limited	D1935	Two-tone BR Green	British Rail Class 47
Locomotive Services Limited	D1924	Two-tone BR Green	British Rail Class 47
Locomotive Services Limited	47830	Two-tone BR Green	British Rail Class 47
Locomotive Services Limited	47853	BR Corporate Blue	British Rail Class 47
Locomotive Services Limited	57003	BR Railfreight Distribution	British Rail Class 57
Locomotive Services Limited	60081	Great Western Railway Green	British Rail Class 60
Long Island Rail Road	101	1979 Blue & White	EMD SW1001
Long Island Rail Road	521	LIRR Bicentennial/America 250	EMD DM30AC
Marquette Rail	2042	G&W "Whisker Stripes"	EMD GP38-2
Maryland Midland	2060	Maryland Midland	EMD GP38-3
MBTA Commuter Rail	1030	Boston & Maine ("Minuteman")	EMD F40PH-3C
MBTA Commuter Rail	1036	New York Central	EMD F40PH-3C
MBTA Commuter Rail	1071	New Haven ("McGinnis")	EMD F40PH-3C
MBTA Commuter Rail	1072	Boston & Maine ("McGinnis")	EMD F40PH-3C
MBTA Commuter Rail	1128	New Haven	GMD GP40MC-3
MBTA Commuter Rail	1129	1980s-era MBTA (maroon with silver bar)	GMD GP40MC-3
MBTA Commuter Rail	1130	Original MBTA Livery	GMD GP40MC-3
Metra	90	Chicago & North Western	EMD F59PHI
Metra	211	Burlington Route	EMD F40PHM-3
Metra	405	Milwaukee Road	MPI MP36PH-3C
Metra	425	Rock Island	MPI MP36PH-3C
Metra	500	RTA	EMD SD70MACH
Missouri and Northern Arkansas	3598	G&W "Whisker Stripes"	EMD GP38-2
Metro-North/CTDOT	201	Conrail	GE P32AC-DM
Metro-North/CTDOT	203	1979 "MTA Central"	GE P32AC-DM
Metro-North/CTDOT	208	1980s-era Metro-North	GE P32AC-DM
Metro-North/CTDOT	211	New York Central	GE P32AC-DM
Metro-North/CTDOT	217	Penn Central	GE P32AC-DM
Metro-North/CTDOT	222	New Haven (Brunswick Green)	GE P32AC-DM
Metro-North/CTDOT	228-231	New Haven ("McGinnis")	GE P32AC-DM
NJ Transit	1319	Lackawanna	Arrow III
NJ Transit	1502/1503	Penn Central	Arrow III
NJ Transit	4109	Jersey Central	EMD GP40PH-2
NJ Transit	4101	New Jersey DOT (Bluebird)	EMD GP40PH-2
NJ Transit	4202	Pennsylvania-Reading Seashore Lines	EMD GP40PH-2B
NJ Transit	4208	Conrail	EMD GP40PH-2B
NJ Transit	4210	Erie	EMD GP40PH-2B
NJ Transit	4519	Erie Lackawanna	Bombardier ALP-45DP
NJ Transit	4636	Pennsylvania	Bombardier ALP-46A
NJ Transit	4640	1980s-era NJT	Bombardier ALP-46A
New York, Susquehanna and Western	3024	Silver and Red Stripe	EMD SD40-2
NCDOT	1893	Original Piedmont Livery (30th Anniversary)	EMD F59PH
Norfolk Southern	1065	Savannah & Atlanta	EMD SD70ACe
Norfolk Southern	1066	New York Central	EMD SD70ACe
Norfolk Southern	1067	Reading	EMD SD70ACe
Norfolk Southern	1068	Erie	EMD SD70ACe
Norfolk Southern	1069	Virginian	EMD SD70ACe
Norfolk Southern	1070	Wabash	EMD SD70ACe
Norfolk Southern	1071	Jersey Central	EMD SD70ACe
Norfolk Southern	1072	Illinois Terminal	EMD SD70ACe
Norfolk Southern	1073	Penn Central	EMD SD70ACe
Norfolk Southern	1074	Lackawanna	EMD SD70ACe
Norfolk Southern	1080	Delaware & Hudson	EMD SD70ACe
Norfolk Southern	1700	Erie Lackawanna	EMD SD45-2
Norfolk Southern	4851	TAG Route	GE AC44C6M
Norfolk Southern	5260 (Note: Wrecked in October 2026)	Belt Line	EMD GP38-2
Norfolk Southern	8025	Monongahela	GE ES44AC
Norfolk Southern	8098	Conrail	GE ES44AC
Norfolk Southern	8099 (Note: Wrecked in 2021, repaired and returned to service in 2023))	Southern	GE ES44AC
Norfolk Southern	8100	Nickel Plate Road	GE ES44AC
Norfolk Southern	8101	Central of Georgia	GE ES44AC
Norfolk Southern	8102	Pennsylvania	GE ES44AC
Norfolk Southern	8103	Norfolk & Western	GE ES44AC
Norfolk Southern	8104	Lehigh Valley	GE ES44AC
Norfolk Southern	8105	Interstate	GE ES44AC
Norfolk Southern	8114	Norfolk Southern (1942–1982)	GE ES44AC
Northern Indiana Commuter Transportation District	3	1980s South Shore Line Scheme	Nippon Sharyo EMU
Northern Indiana Commuter Transportation District	25	1980s South Shore Line Scheme	Nippon Sharyo EMU
NSW Trainlink	XP2006, XP2009, and a set of cars	State Rail Authority "Candy"	New South Wales XPT
Ohio Central	2014	G&W "Whisker Stripes"	EMD GP38-2
Ontario Northland	1730	Classic ON Scheme	EMD SD40-2
Pan Am Railways	507	Guilford Rail System	GMD GP40-2LW
Reading Blue Mountain and Northern	1983	Blue Mountain and Reading	EMD SD40-2
Nordic Re-finance AB	1166	Amtrak X995 Phase II	SJ RC4
Rock Island (2017)	2127	Rock Island 1975 Scheme	GE C40-8
SEPTA Regional Rail	276	Pennsylvania Railroad	Silverliner IV
SEPTA Regional Rail	280, 293	Reading Lines	Silverliner IV
SEPTA Regional Rail	304	Conrail	Silverliner IV
SEPTA Regional Rail	401	Penn Central	Silverliner IV
SEPTA Metro	101	Philadelphia & West Chester Traction Co.	Kawasaki K-car
SEPTA Metro	9000, 9100	1980s-era SEPTA	Kawasaki K-car
Shenandoah Valley	367	Norkfolk and Western	ALCO RS-11
Shenandoah Valley	5940	Chesapeake & Ohio	EMD GP9
Shenandoah Valley	6512	Baltimore & Ohio	EMD GP9
St. Lawrence and Atlantic	4022	G&W "Whisker Stripes"	EMD SD70MAC
St. Lawrence and Atlantic	4024	G&W "Whisker Stripes"	EMD SD70MAC
Terminal Railroad Association of St. Louis	1797	Wiggins Ferry Company	EMD slug
Terminal Railroad Association of St. Louis	1889	Wiggins Ferry Company	EMD SD60
Union Pacific	1982	Missouri Pacific	EMD SD70ACe
Union Pacific	1983	Western Pacific	EMD SD70ACe
Union Pacific	1988	Katy	EMD SD70ACe
Union Pacific	1989	Rio Grande	EMD SD70ACe
Union Pacific	1995	Chicago & North Western	EMD SD70ACe
Union Pacific	1996	Southern Pacific	EMD SD70ACe
Wheeling and Lake Erie	101	P&WV	EMD GP35
Wheeling and Lake Erie	107	AC&Y	EMD GP35

== See also ==
- Heritage or retro airline liveries
