= GE C39-8 =

1980s American diesel-electric locomotive

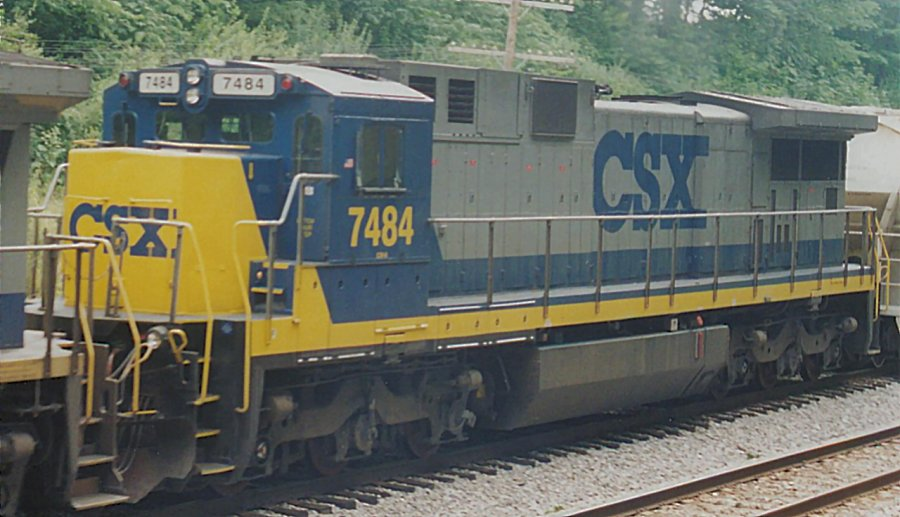
- CSX 7484, a former Conrail C39-8, built in 1986.
Type and origin
- Power type: Diesel-electric
- Builder: GE Transportation Systems
- Model: C39-8
- Build date: 1984 – 1987
- Total produced: 161
Specifications
- Configuration
  - AAR: C-C
- Gauge: 4 ft 8 1/2 in (1,435 mm) standard gauge
- Wheel diameter: 40 in (1,016 mm)
- Length: 70 ft 8 in (21.54 m)
- Fuel capacity: 3,900–4,500 US gal (15,000–17,000 L; 3,200–3,700 imp gal)
- Prime mover: 7FDL-16
Performance figures
- Maximum speed: 70 mph (113 km/h)
- Power output: 3,900 hp (2,900 kW)
Career
- Operators: See table
- Locale: United States
- Disposition: One used as a test bed, remainder either rebuilt or scrapped

The GE C39-8 is a 6-axle diesel-electric locomotive model built by GE Transportation Systems between 1984 and 1987. It is part of the GE Dash 8 Series of freight locomotives. A total of 161 examples of this locomotive were built for two North American railroads: Conrail and Norfolk Southern Railway.

== Technical ==
The C39-8 is powered by a 3,900 horsepower (2,900 kW) V16 7FDL-16 diesel engine driving a GE GMC187A2 main alternator. The power generated by the main alternator drove 6 GE 752AG traction motors, each with a gear ratio of 83:20 and connected to 40-inch (1,016 mm) wheels which allowed the C39-8 a maximum speed of 70 mph (110 km/h). The C39-8 has a maximum tractive effort of 108,600 lbf (483,000 N) at 10.8 mph (17.4 km/h).

Depending on customer options, the C39-8 carried between 3,900 to 4,500 US gal (14,763 to 17,034 L; 3,247 to 3,747 imp gal) of diesel fuel, 360 to 400 US gal (1,363 to 1,514 L; 300 to 333 imp gal) of lubricating oil, and 380 to 420 US gal (1,438 to 1,590 L; 316 to 350 imp gal) of coolant. Like most North American diesel locomotives, the C39-8 uses normal water for cooling.

The C39-8 was a fairly unpopular locomotive with crews, cited factors such as a rough ride, tendency to overheat, frequent turbocharger issues, issues with the fuel injection system, and various other reliability issues.

== Original owners ==
GE C39-8 owners
Railroad	Quantity	Road numbers	Notes
Norfolk Southern	114	8550-8663	8550,8551 former GE demonstrators set up for short hood forward operation. 8552-8663 set up for long hood forward operation. All units have been retired.
Norfolk Southern	25	8664-8688	C39-8E (Enhanced) built in carbody similar to the GE C40-8. All have been retired. 8687 damaged in collision with semi truck in 1992. The entire incident was caught on camera. Unit 8688 currently used as a test bed in Altoona
Conrail	22	6000-6021	After Conrail split in 1999, 13 units went to Norfolk Southern to become NS 8200-8212 and are no longer in service with NS, 9 units went to CSX to become CSXT 7480-7488 and have since been retired.

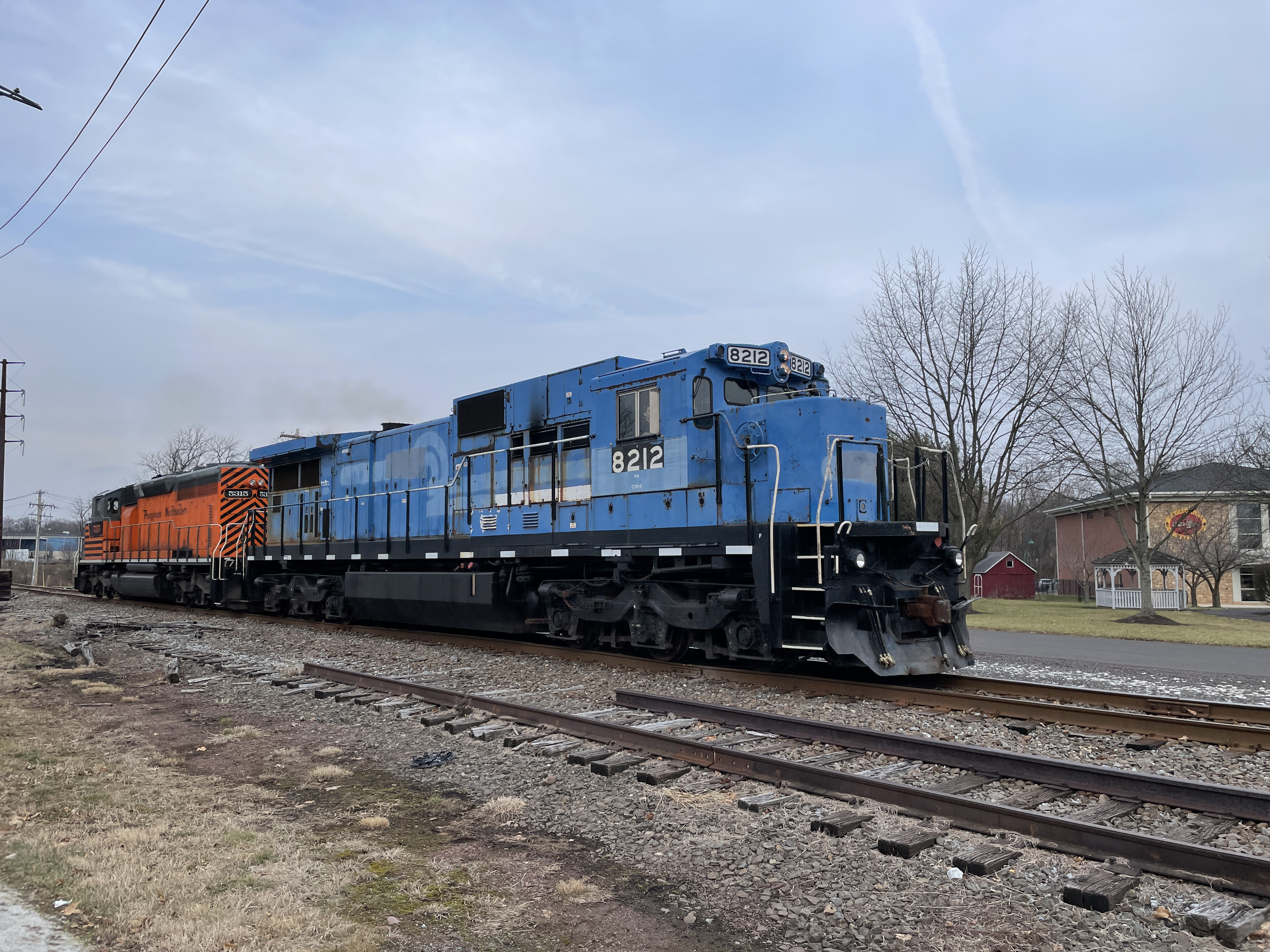
PN 8212 in January 2023

== Current use ==
Apart from Norfolk Southern's test bed, Pennsylvania Northeastern Railroad's former Norfolk Southern 8212 (née Conrail 6021) was the last C39-8 in active use in North America. On November 20, 2026, No. 8212 was picked up from Lansdale, Pennsylvania by CSX L042 for interchange to an undisclosed destination, but whether it has been slated for scrapping or potential preservation has yet to be disclosed.

15 Norfolk Southern units were sold to Peru's Ferrocarril Central Andino (FCCA) after RDC acquired a significant part of the company in 1999. Many of them have been rebuilt by shortening the radiators.

== See also ==
- List of GE locomotives
