= GE Dash 8-32B =

Class of American diesel-electric locomotives

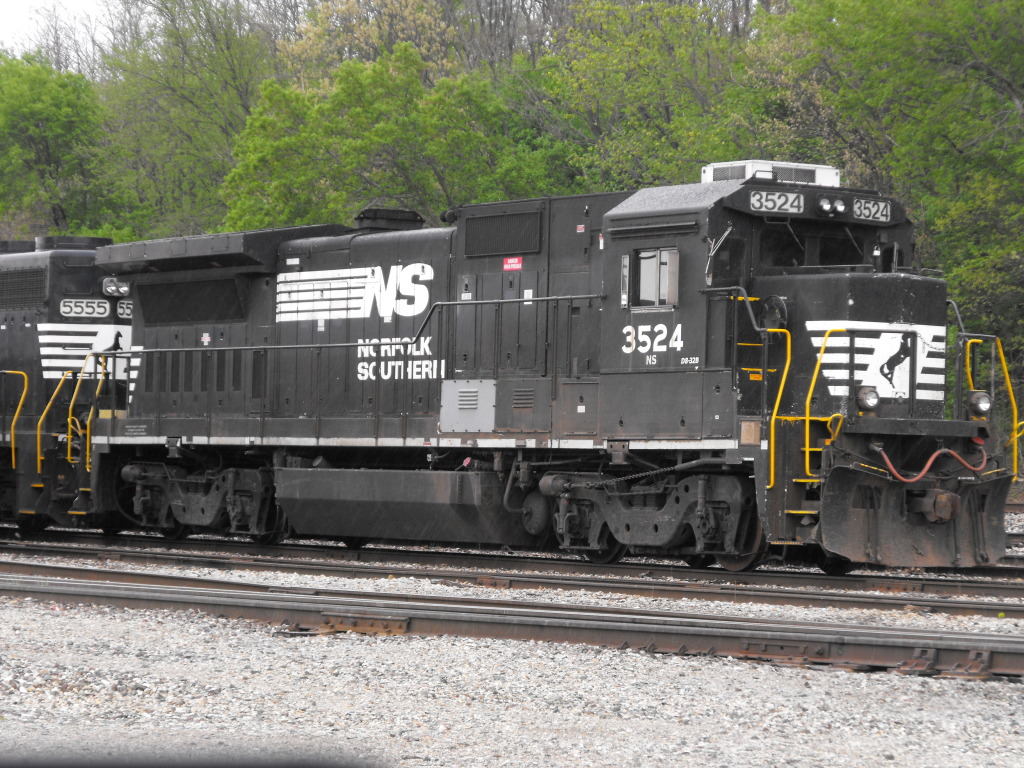
- NS #3524 (Dash 8-32B) at NS Hinman Yard.
Type and origin
- Power type: Diesel-electric
- Builder: GE Transportation
- Model: Dash 8-32B
- Build date: 1984 – 1989
- Total produced: 49
Specifications
- Configuration
  - AAR: B-B
- Gauge: 4 ft 8 1/2 in (1,435 mm) standard gauge
- Prime mover: GE 7FDL-12
- Cylinders: 12
Performance figures
- Power output: 3,150 hp (2,350 kW)
Career
- Locale: North America
- Disposition: 4 preserved, some sold off, remainder in storage awaiting fate.

The GE Dash 8-32B (also classified as B32-8 or D8-32B by some railroad companies) is a 4-axle 3,150 hp (2,350 kW) diesel-electric locomotive built by GE Transportation between 1984 and 1989. It is part of the GE Dash 8 Series of freight locomotives.

A total of 49 examples of the Dash 8-32B model were built for North American railroads. The model is a 12-cylinder version of the (16 cylinder) Dash 8-40B and is powered by GE's 7FDL engine. The first units built for the Burlington Northern Railroad were labelled by GE as B32-8, while later units built for Norfolk Southern followed GE's practice after 1987 of spelling "Dash 8" in the model name. The GE Dash 8-32BWH (or B32-8WH) is a variant built with Head End Power (HEP) and a wide cab for Amtrak service.

== Original owners ==
Railroad	Quantity	Road numbers	Notes
Burlington Northern Railroad	3	5497-5499	Returned to GE
General Electric (demonstrator/testbed)	1	832	
Norfolk Southern	45	3522-3566	

== Preservation ==
- Norfolk Southern #3563 is preserved at the Lake Shore Railway Historical Society in North East, Pennsylvania. NS donated the locomotive in 2013.
- Western Maryland Scenic Railroad operates three Dash 8-32Bs, #539, #558 and #561. Units #539 and #558 are painted in a livery inspired by the Western Maryland Railway's "Fireball" paint scheme, while unit #561 has been painted into the WM's "Circus" scheme, which it debuted at Cumberland Railfest 2025 on September 13, 2025.

== See also ==
- List of GE locomotives
