= GE Dash 8-44CW =

Diesel-electric locomotive

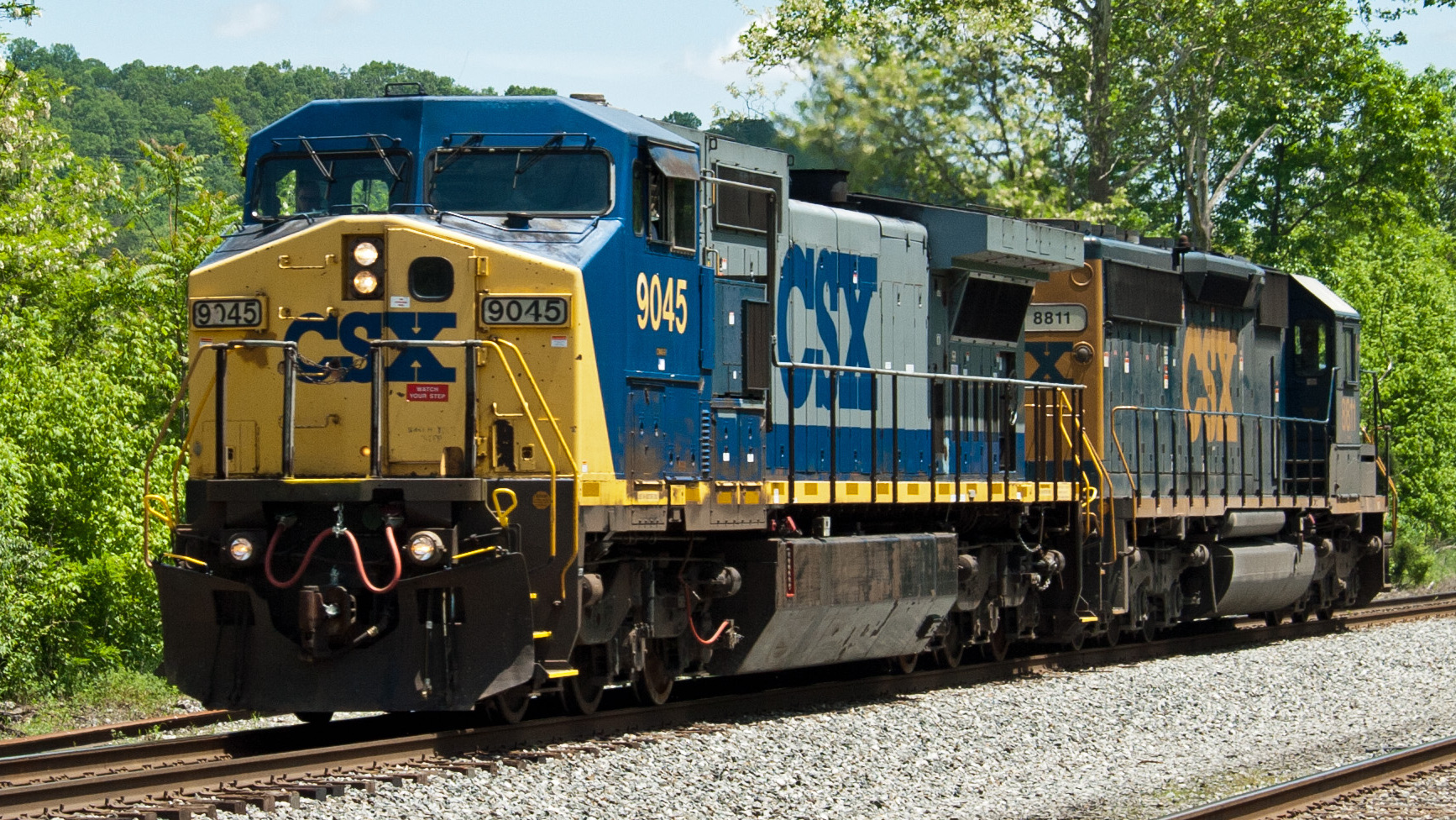
- CSX Transportation Dash 8-44CW no. 9045
Type and origin
- Power type: Diesel-electric
- Builder: GE Transportation Systems
- Model: Dash 9-44CW
- Build date: 7/1993 - 3/1994
- Total produced: 53
Specifications
- Configuration
  - AAR: C-C
  - UIC: Co′Co′
- Gauge: 4 ft 8 1/2 in (1,435 mm)
- Trucks: GE FB3
- Wheel diameter: 42 in (1.067 m)
- Length: 70 ft 8 in (21.54 m)
- Width: 10 ft 3 in (3.12 m)
- Height: 16 ft 0 in (4.88 m)
- Loco weight: 425,000 lb (193,000 kg) or 212.5 short tons (189.7 long tons; 192.8 t)
- Fuel capacity: 5,000 US gal (19,000 L; 4,200 imp gal)
- Prime mover: GE 7FDL16
- Engine type: 45°, four stroke cycle
- Aspiration: Turbocharged
- Alternator: GE GMG197
- Traction motors: DC GE 5GE752AH
- Cylinders: V16
- Transmission: diesel electric with silicon diode rectifiers,
Performance figures
- Power output: 4,400 hp (3,280 kW)
- Tractive effort: Continuous: 105,640 lbf (469.9 kN), Starting: 142,000 lbf (631.6 kN)
Career
- Operators: CSX
- Numbers: CSX 9000-9052
- Locale: Eastern United States
- First run: 1993
- Disposition: Some still in service as of 2026, remainder retired or scrapped

The GE C44-8W is a 4,400 hp (3,280 kW) diesel-electric locomotive built by GE Transportation Systems of Erie, Pennsylvania, part of the GE Dash 9 Series of freight locomotives. These are considered to be pre-production testbed models of the GE Dash 9 series, utilizing the frame, trucks, and carbody from a GE C40-8W. These were delivered exclusively for CSX Transportation.

The term "C44-8W" is mostly an unofficial term, as these are officially designated as "C44-9Ws" on the locomotive cab sides. These are pre-production Dash 9s, built with C40-8W carbodies. Unlike the C40-8W, these are instead equipped with a 4400 hp GE 7FDL16, and GE "Dash-9" Electrical systems. Other examples of these also include the ALL/EFVM ordered C44-9WMs. These share the same C40-8W carbody quirk, but instead utilized a modified 'Brazilian' cab for tunnel clearance.

While the Dash-8 term is more of a nickname, it still follows the GE Tradition of nicknaming locomotives by the electrical system. It began with the GE "Dash-7" series in the 1970s, continuing until the debut of the "Dash-9" series, the last to be named as such. This series of design has been successful amongst North American, Australian, and Brazilian railroads.

== See also ==
- List of GE locomotives
