= GE Dash 8-40CW =

GE diesel-electric locomotive

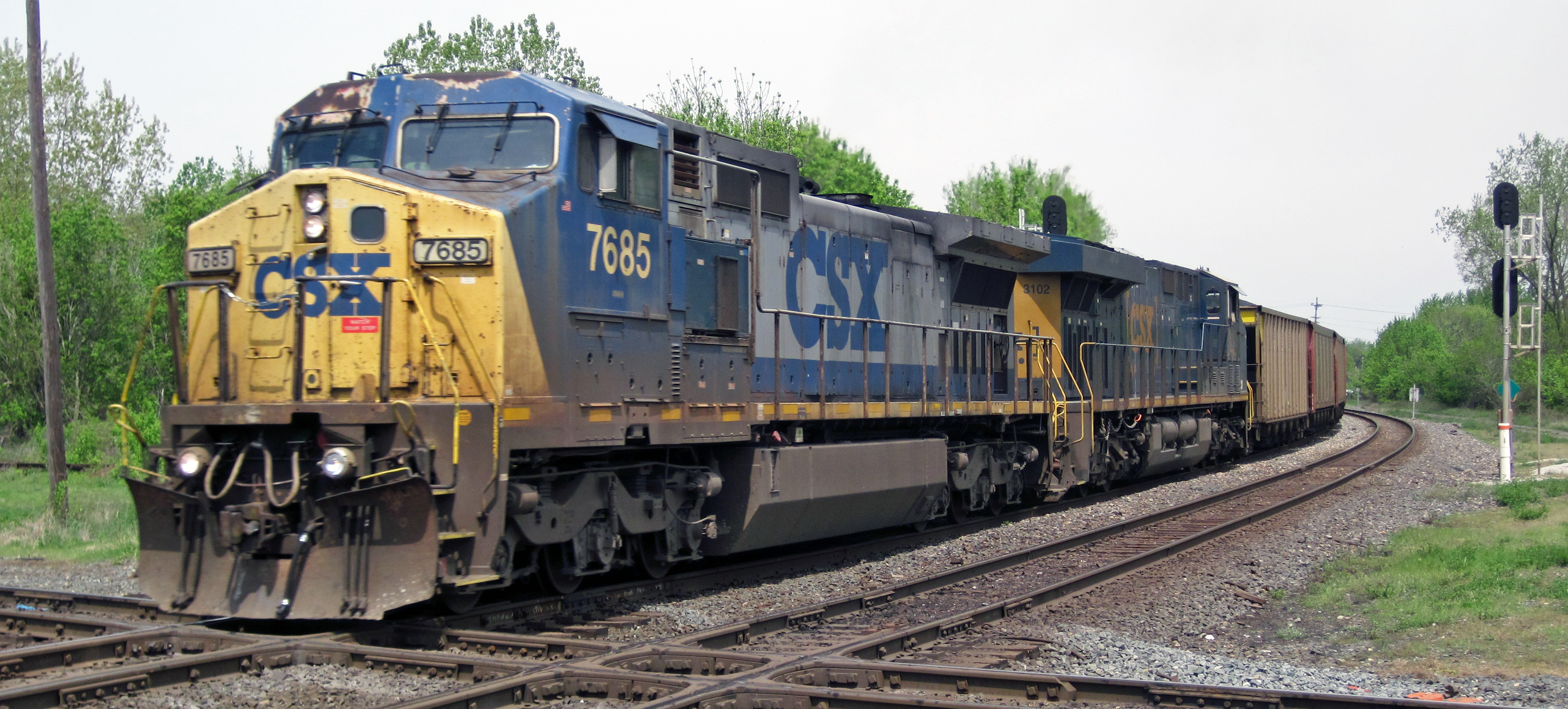
- CSXT no. 7685, a GE Dash 8-40CW in Marion, Ohio.
Type and origin
- Power type: Diesel-electric
- Builder: GE Transportation Systems
- Model: C40-8W
- Build date: 1989 – 1994
- Total produced: 1,531
Specifications
- Configuration
  - AAR: C-C
- Gauge: 4 ft 8 1/2 in (1,435 mm) standard gauge
- Driver dia.: 40 in (1,016 mm)
- Length: 70 ft 8 in (21.54 m)
- Width: 10 ft 2 in (3.10 m)
- Height: 15 ft 4 in (4.67 m)
- Fuel capacity: 5,000 US gal (19,000 L; 4,200 imp gal)
- Lubricant cap.: 410 US gal (1,600 L; 340 imp gal)
- Coolant cap.: 380 US gal (1,400 L; 320 imp gal)
- Prime mover: GE 7FDL-16
- Engine type: V16 diesel
- Alternator: GE GMG187
- Traction motors: 6x GE 752AG or 752AH
- Cylinders: 16
Performance figures
- Maximum speed: 70 mph (113 km/h)
- Power output: 4,000 hp (3,000 kW) some uprated to 4,100 hp (3,100 kW), some uprated to 4,135 HP
- Tractive effort: 108,600 lbf (483 kN)
Career
- Operators: See table
- Locale: North America
- Disposition: Some still in service as of 2026, most in storage, or have been retired and/or sold to other railroads or leasing companies, or scrapped and rebuilt, one selected for preservation.

The GE Dash 8-40CW is a 6-axle diesel-electric locomotive built by GE Transportation Systems from 1989 to 1994. Often referred to as the C40-8W, it is part of the GE Dash 8 Series of freight locomotives. This locomotive model is distinguished from the predecessor Dash 8-40C by the addition of a newer "wide" or "safety" cab. A cowl-bodied version of this locomotive, built only for the Canadian market, was the GE Dash 8-40CM.

== History ==
The first Dash 8-40CW, 9356, was built for the Union Pacific railroad in December 1989. In total, GE would build 756 Dash 8-40CWs. The Dash 8-40CW was succeeded by the Dash 9-44CW in 1994.

Like most GE locomotives, the Dash 8-40CW saw continuous upgrades over the course of its production. Later model Conrail units were built with split cooling systems for the turbocharger intercooler and engine cooling (previous Dash 8 series had both on the same cooling system). The later units delivered to Conrail in 1993 and 1994 were equipped with GE's Integrated Function Displays (IFD). The IFDs are LCD displays that provide the engineer with the same information previously provided by analog gauges, as well as integrating distance counter and End of Train Device telemetry functions.

As of 2021, while many Dash 8-40CW locomotives are still in service, most are either being stored in "dead lines" by Class I railroads, have been retired and/or sold to other railroads or leasing companies, or have been cut up for scrap.

== Technical ==
The Dash 8-40CW is powered by a 4,000-horsepower (3,000 kW) V16 7FDL diesel engine driving a GE GMG187 main alternator. The power generated by the main alternator drives six GE 752AG or 752AH Direct Current traction motors, each with a gear ratio of 83:20 and connected to 40-inch (1,016 mm) wheels which allow the Dash 8-40CW a maximum speed of 70 mph (110 km/h).

Depending on customer options, the Dash 8-40CW carries approximately 5000 US gallons (18927 L) of diesel fuel, 410 US gal (1,552 L) of lubricating oil, and 380 gallons (1,438 L) of coolant. The Dash 8-40CW has a maximum tractive effort of 108,600 lbf (483,000 N) at 11 mph (18 km/h) with the 83:20 gearing. Overall dimensions for the Dash 8-40CW are 70 ft 8 in (21.54 m) in length, 15 ft 4 in (4.67 m) in height and 10 ft 2 in (3.10 m) in width.

== Rebuilds ==
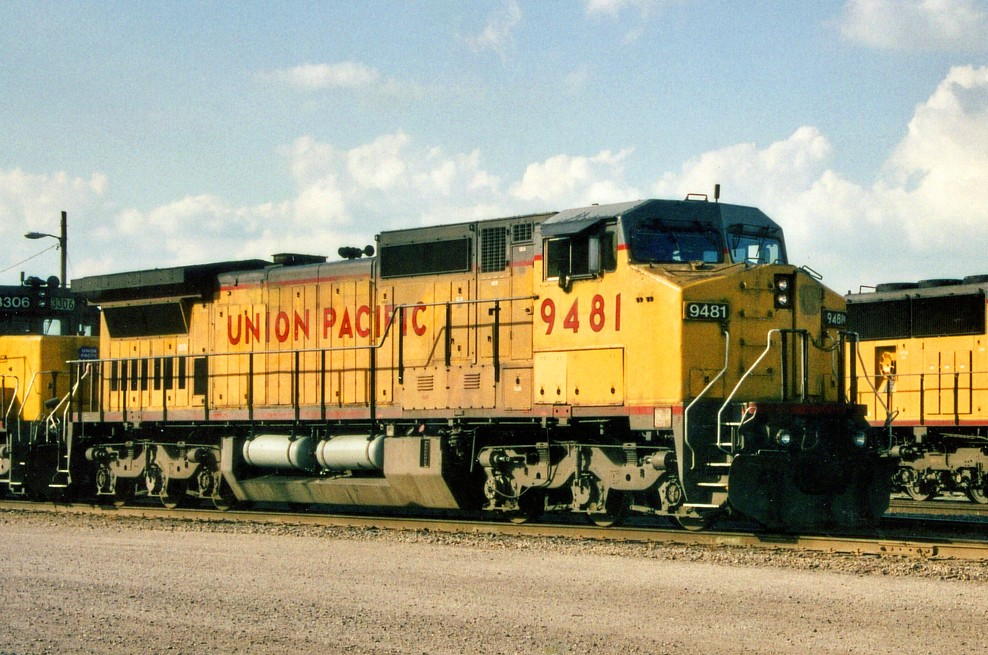
Union Pacific no. 9481, a Dash 8-41CW.

The General Electric Dash 8-41CW or Dash 8-41W (C41-8W) is a variation with the same 16-cylinder engine upgraded to 4,135 hp (3,083 kW). 154 were produced between 1993 and 1994 for both the Union Pacific and Santa Fe (ATSF) railroads, and some Dash 8-40CW units were also uprated to Dash 8-41CW standard by the railroads. Since no four-axle versions of this unit were built, the "C" designation (indicating trucks with three powered axles, or C-C) is often omitted.

The General Electric Dash 8-44CW or Dash 8-44W (C44-8W) was a variation with its 16-cylinder engine uprated to 4,400 hp (3,280 kW). It was produced, only for CSX. It was known as the CW44-8. Production lasted from 1993 to 1994. It was considered to be pre-production Dash-9 model, with upgraded split-cooling system, dynamic brake grid, electronics, control systems, and updated traction motors. 53 units were produced. Like the Dash 8-41CW, no four-axle versions of this unit were built. The "C" designation (indicating trucks with three powered axles, or C-C) is often omitted. Since 2023, CSX scrapped all of the remaining Dash 8-44CW's.

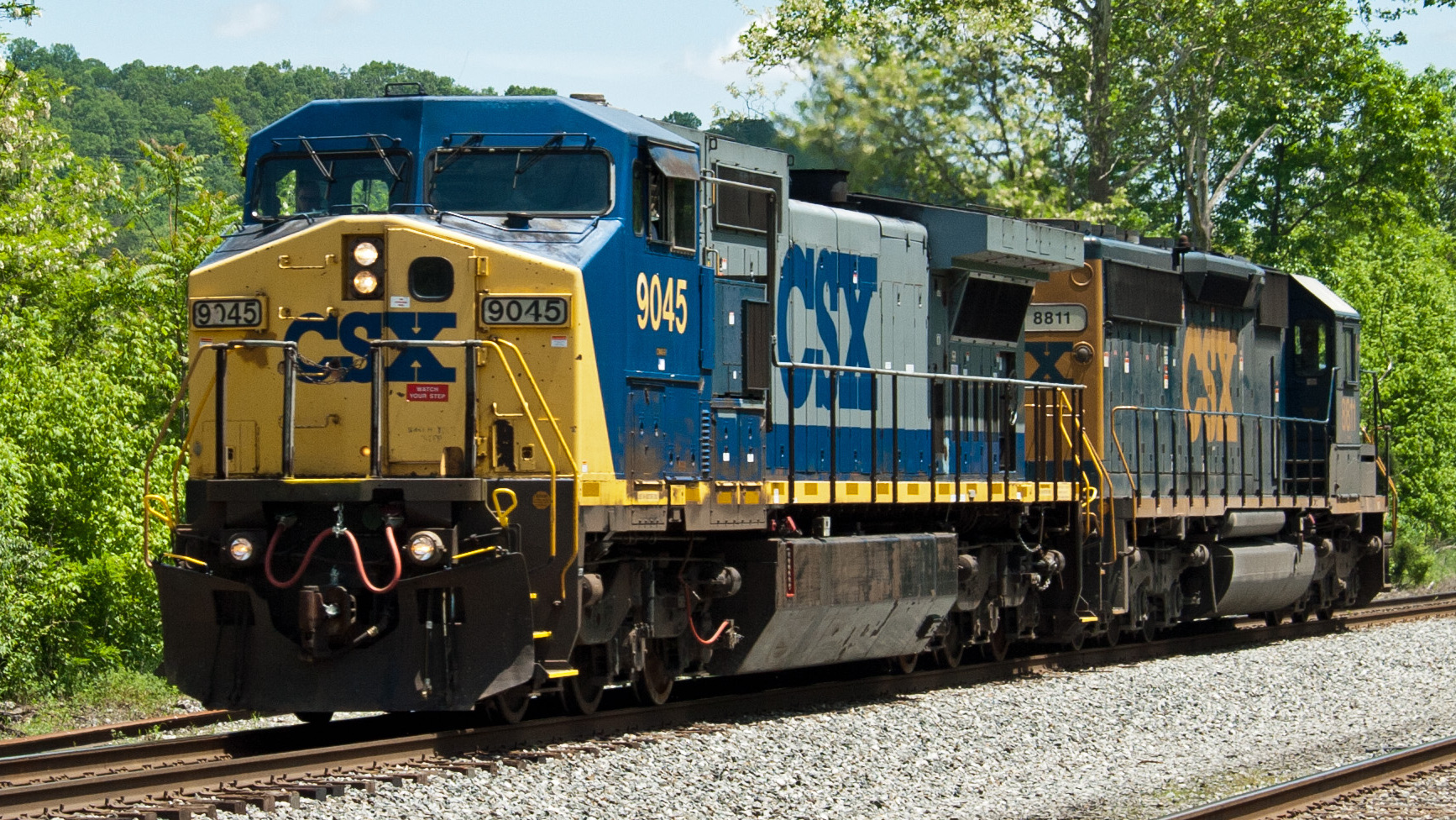
CSX Transportation no. 9045, one of only 53 Dash 8-44CWs.

The GE Dash 8.5-40CW was a 6-axle 4,000 hp (2,800 kW) diesel-electric locomotive rebuilt by Norfolk Southern. The first locomotive started its rebuild in 2012. Only one unit is on the active roster, and it is stored. The units will be rebuilt with the Norfolk Southern-designed wide-nose RLS cab which meets current FRA crashworthiness standards. The rebuild will also include the installation of locomotive speed limiter (LSL), and cab signals and other electronics upgrades. NS discontinued the rebuild program in April 2016 due to repeated failures, and even retired these locomotives in April 2020.

The GE Dash 8-40CWM was an experimental rebuild program done by GE in partnership with CSX at GE's Locomotive plant at Erie, PA in late 2016 and early 2017 to see if they were worth rebuilding. The program consisted of 10 Dash 8-40CWs from CSX, #'s 7771, 7774, 7779, 7780, 7786, 7787, 7799, 7801, 7807, and 7811. The units were rebuilt with updated prime movers, new cab interiors, new control system (upgrade to CCA from IFC), installation of PTC equipment, fresh repaint, body work as needed, addition of shutters to the radiator to help more accurately control the engine temperature, and a few other refurbs.

== Operators ==
| Image | Railroad | Quantity | Road numbers | Notes |
|---|---|---|---|---|
| | Atchison, Topeka and Santa Fe Railway | 152 | 800–951 | "Super Fleet"; 927–951 are model C41-8W. Passed on to BNSF following the BN/ATSF merger in 1996. |
| | Berkshire and Eastern Railroad | 12 | 7655, 7727, 7797, 7835, 7875–7881, 7898 | All units were formerly owned by CSX. Units 7655, 7727, 7797, 7835, 7875, and 7898 were previously owned by Pan Am Railways prior to the CSX-Pan Am merger. |
| | BNSF Railway | 152 | 800–951 | 800–866 sold to CN. 867–951 still on property, but most are currently in storage. |
| | Canadian National Railway | 67 | 2098–2099, 2135–2199 | Former BNSF 800–866. Originally ATSF 800–866. 2150 donated to BCIT - Delta, BC, CA. |
| | Conrail | 236 | 6050–6285 | Split between CSX and NS following the split up of Conrail on June 1, 1999; Nos. 6266–6285 are ex-LMSX Nos. 740–759. Unit 6096 was destroyed in a wreck in January 1999. |
| | CSX Transportation | 375 | 7300–7396, 7649–7668, 7670–7929 | Classed as CW40-8. 7300–7396 originally bought by Conrail. 7918–7929 originally bought by LMSX, 7300-7396 have been retired and sold to GECX leasing. 7650-7929 are mostly still in service, however, some are in storage or have been sold. Units 7732, 7783, and 7803 were wrecked and retired. 7669 was renumbered to 7649. 7812 was temporarily renumbered to 1992 and was named "The Spirit of America!" and was renumbered back and repainted into the standard CSX livery in 2000. |
| | Illinois Central Railroad | 12 | 2455–2466 | Bought from LMSX. Conrail Blue paint with CN markings and IC sublettering. Some have been repainted into standard CN paint. 2464 was scrapped in 2012 following a wreck. Remainder of the units were retired and scrapped in 2022–23, except 2466, which is most likely to be preserved at some point. |
| | Locomotive Management Services (LMSX) | 60 | 700–759 | Conrail lease units. Split between CSX, NS, and IC. Nos. 740–759 to Conrail Nos. 6266–6285. |
| | New England Central Railroad | 7 | 4062–4068 | All units were formerly owned by CSX. Units 4062–4064 were owned by Conrail before being acquired by CSX following the Conrail split up. |
| | Norfolk Southern Railway | 154 | 8314–8467 | All units originally Conrail or LMSX. All units were retired in 2020. |
| | Union Pacific Railroad | 204 | 9356–9559 | 9481–9559 are model C41-8W. Most stored or sold to GECX. 9521 and 9532 sold to Ferrocarril Central Andino in 2024. |
| | Pan Am Railways | 6 | 7655, 7727, 7797, 7835, 7875, 7898 | Classed as C40-8W. All units formerly CSX. To Berkshire & Eastern following the 2022 CSX-Pan Am merger. |
| | GE Capital Leasing (GECX) | 108 | 9124-9450, 7700–7900, 7902–7922, 7300–7396, 7653–7695 | All units are former CSX and Union Pacific. Units were temporarily leased to Canadian National and Norfolk Southern due to high rail traffic levels. Some units have since been sold to different owners, including Alabama & Gulf Coast, Berkshire & Eastern, Washington Eastern, Indiana & Ohio, Chicago, Fort Wayne & Eastern, and New England Central. |
| | Ferrocarril Central Andino (FCCA) | 5 | 1033-1034, 1035-1037 | 1033 and 1034 are ex-CSX C40-8Ws; 1035 - 1037 are ex UP C41-8Ws |

== See also ==
- List of GE locomotives
