= GE Dash 8-40C =

Model of diesel-electric locomotive produced by General Electric

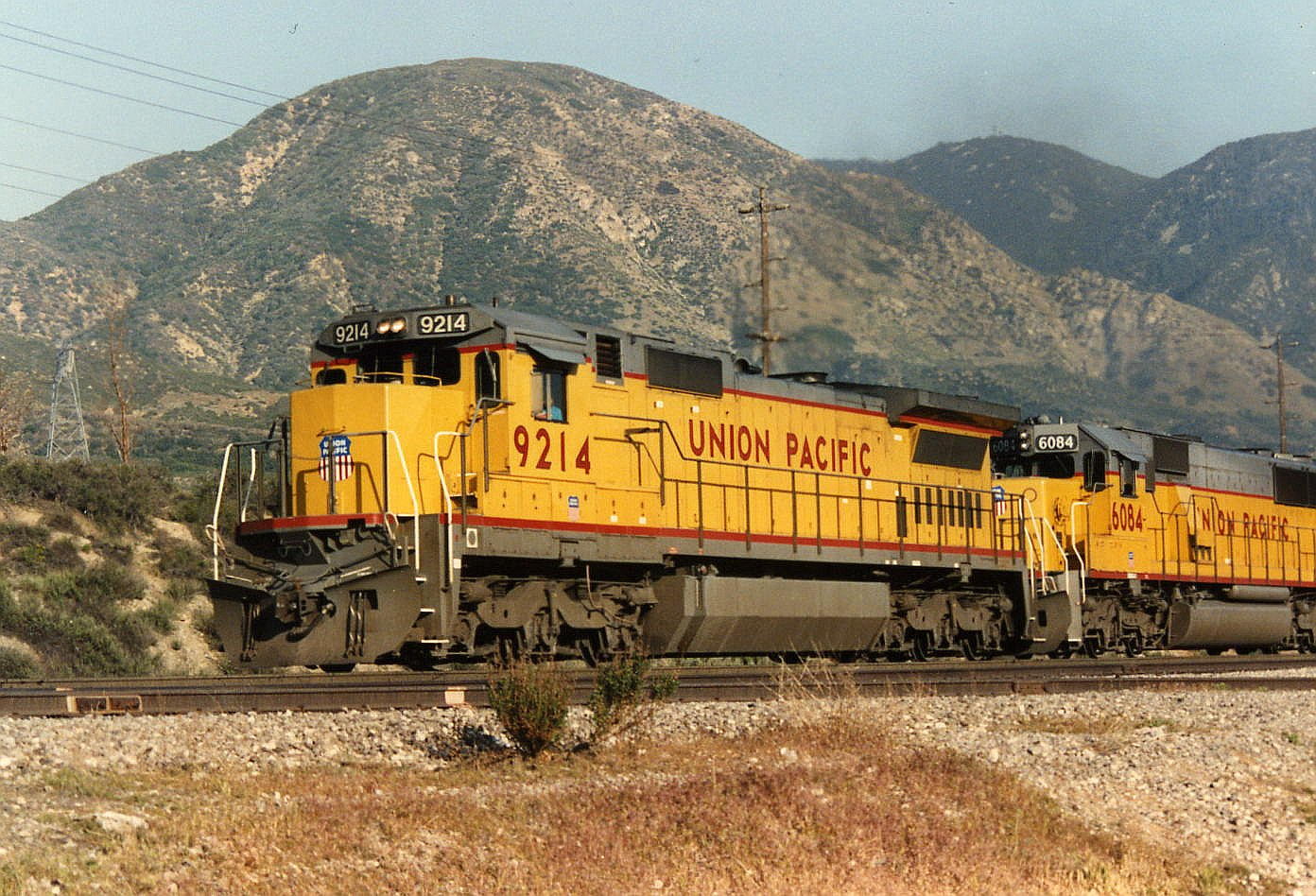
- Union Pacific no. 9214, a Dash 8-40C, leads an eastbound train up California's Cajon Pass on May 10, 1991.
Type and origin
- Power type: Diesel-electric
- Builder: GE Transportation Systems
- Model: C40-8
- Build date: 1987–1992
- Total produced: 607
Specifications
- Configuration
  - AAR: C-C [BB40-8M = B-B+B-B Brazil]
- Gauge: 4 ft 8 1/2 in (1,435 mm) standard gauge 5 ft 3 in (1,600 mm) and 3 ft 3 in (991 mm), Brazil [BB40-8M]
- Length: 70 ft 8 in (21.54 m)
- Width: 10 ft 3.5 in (3.14 m)
- Height: 15 ft 4.5 in (4.69 m)
- Loco weight: 391,600 lb (177,600 kg)
- Fuel capacity: 5,000 US gal (4,200 imp gal; 19,000 L)
- Prime mover: GE 7FDL-16
Career
- Operators: Various
- Locale: North America, Brazil
- Disposition: Nearly all have been either retired or scrapped as of 2026

The GE C40-8 is a model of 6-axle diesel-electric locomotive built by GE Transportation Systems between 1987 and 1992. It is part of the GE Dash 8 Series of freight locomotives, and its wheel arrangement is of a C-C type.

This locomotive model is often referred to as a Dash 8-40C or simply "Dash 8". "Dash 8" in general refers to the electrical control series, "Dash" being a carryover from the older syntax of C40-8. The "40" refers to the baseline horsepower rating (4,000 hp or 3,000 kW) of the unit, although some units may be re-rated to 4,100 hp (3,100 kW).

Later units were supplied with a wide-nose cab and are designated Dash 8-40CW, the "W" indicating a wide-nose cab.

== C41-8 ==
Some railroads, the Chicago and North Western Railway in particular, upgraded some of their units to ~4,135 hp (3,083 kW) and designated them as C42-8. This designation was modified by the Union Pacific Railroad to C41-8 after its takeover of C&NW in 1995. Former C&NW units are usually identified by a grab-iron on the front nose just above the Union Pacific shield logo, and/or the "C41-8" designation on the cab side. The final three C&NW C40-8s were built with 4,135 hp (3,083 kW), and the prior 32 units were similarly modified as well. Although none of these units were ever officially classed as C41-8 by GE, a safety cab version was built as the Dash 8-41CW.

== Original Owners ==
Image	Railroad	Quantity	Road numbers	Notes
	Chicago and North Western Transportation Company	77	8501-8577	8575-8577 were 4,150 hp (3,090 kW), all units were passed on to UP and later sold to CREX and later Canadian National; Unit 2127 resold to Rock Island Rail
	Conrail	25	6025-6049	Split between CSX and NS, all units remaining in Conrail colors are retired
	CSX Transportation	157	7489-7498, 7500-7646, 9280	Classed as C40-8, 7489-7498 are ex-Conrail. All retired from May 2016 to February 2017, most have been sold off to other railroads or have been scrapped. 24 units sold to Pan Am; later to Berkshire & Eastern following Pan Am purchase; Unit 7627 reacquired by CSX and renumbered 9280, then retired again and sold to LTEX. 7520 was wrecked and retired.
	Estrada de Ferro Carajás	4	501-504	
	Norfolk Southern Railway	89	8300-8313, 8689-8763	8300-8313 are ex-Conrail. All units were to be rebuilt with a new wide cab, upgraded electronics, etc. 8500-8504, 8506-8513 being rebuilt with an NS "Crescent" nose/cab (The same on the SD60Es), 8505 being rebuilt with a GE widenose and cab. They are classified as a Dash 8.5-40CW but are labeled as D8.5-40CW. However, due to repeated failures, all Norfolk Southern C40-8's were sold or scrapped, and 47 new ET44AC and three ES44AC locomotives replaced them. Last remaining units retired in 2017.
	Union Pacific Railroad	255	9100-9355, 9185 (2nd)	No. 9185 (first) returned to GE, became testbed. As of early 2019, all units have been sold/auctioned off except for 9152, 9240, and 9259.

== See also ==
- List of GE locomotives
