= GE Dash 8-32BWH =

American diesel locomotive

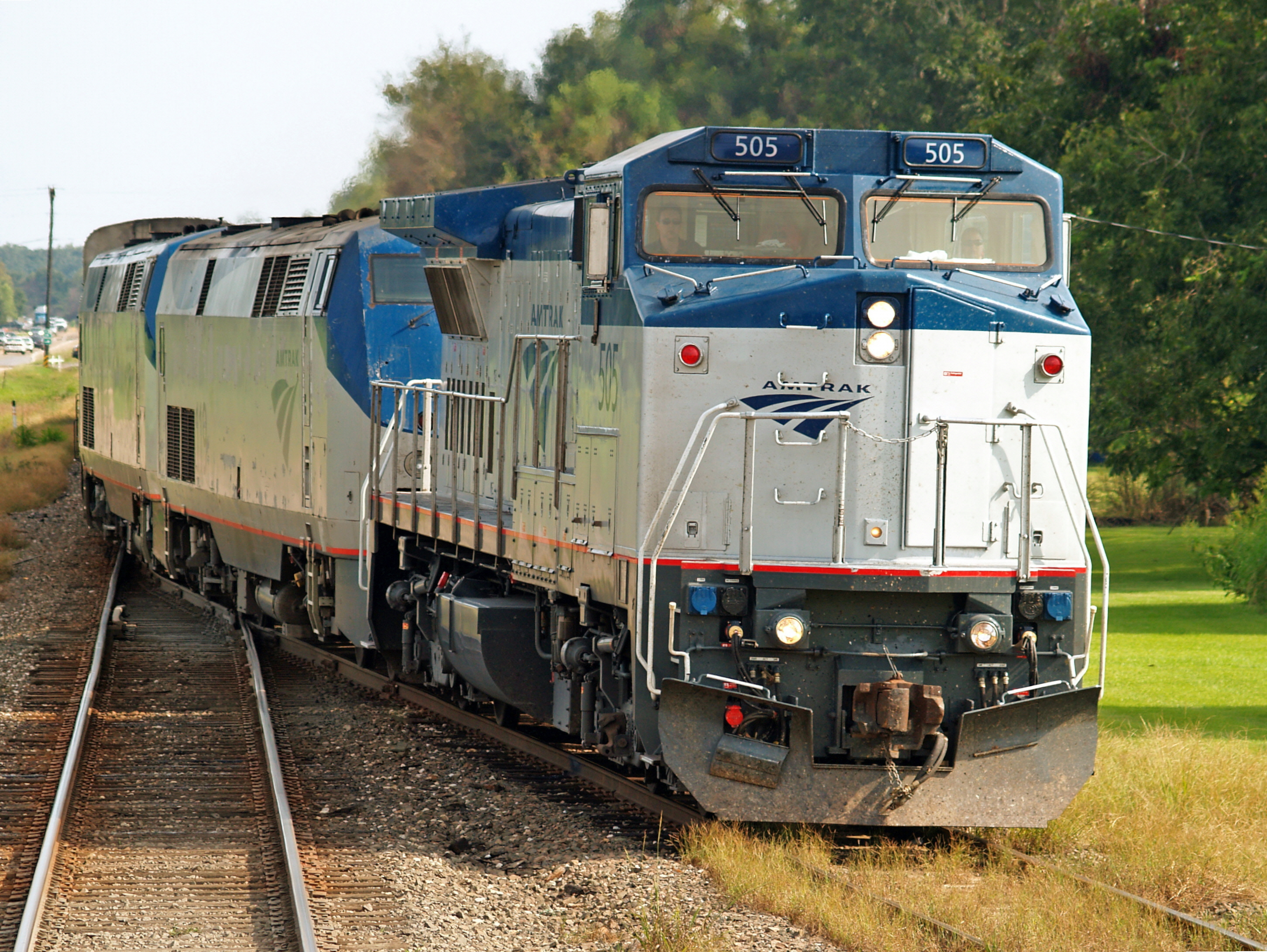
- Amtrak No. 505 leading the Sunset Limited through Cade, Louisiana
Type and origin
- Power type: Diesel-electric
- Builder: GE Transportation Systems
- Model: Dash 8-32BWH
- Build date: 1990–1991
- Total produced: 20
Specifications
- Configuration
  - AAR: B-B
  - UIC: Bo'Bo'
- Gauge: 4 ft 8 1/2 in (1,435 mm) standard gauge
- Trucks: General Electric Floating Bolster (FB2)
- Wheel diameter: 40 in (1,016 mm)
- Minimum curve: 150 ft (46 m) / 39° (single unit); 175 ft (53 m) / 33° (coupled)
- Wheelbase: 39 ft 8 in (12.09 m) (between truck centers)
- Length: 66 ft 4 in (20.22 m)
- Width: 9 ft 11 1/4 in (3.029 m)
- Height: 15 ft 4 in (4.67 m)
- Axle load: 79,148.3 lb (35,901 kg)
- Adhesive weight: 100%
- Loco weight: 274,890 lb (124,688 kilograms)
- Fuel type: Diesel
- Fuel capacity: 1,800 US gal (6,800 L; 1,500 imp gal)
- Lubricant cap.: 365 US gal (1,380 L; 304 imp gal)
- Coolant cap.: 350 US gal (1,300 L; 290 imp gal)
- Sandbox cap.: 26 cubic feet (740 L)
- Prime mover: GE 7FDL-12
- RPM range: 400-1,050 (720 or 900 when supplying HEP)
- Engine type: 45° V12, four stroke cycle
- Aspiration: Turbocharged
- Displacement: 131.4 liters (8,020 cu in)
- Alternator: GMG 195A1
- Traction motors: 4 GE 752AH DC traction motors
- Head end power: Alternator-driven head-end power (GTA 33A1)
- Cylinders: 12
- Cylinder size: 10.95 liters (668 cu in)
- Transmission: AC-DC
- MU working: Yes
- Train heating: Locomotive-supplied head-end power, 800 kW (1,100 hp)
- Loco brake: Dynamic / Electropneumatic
- Train brakes: Pneumatic
- Safety systems: FRA standards ACSES II
Performance figures
- Maximum speed: 103 mph (166 km/h)
- Power output: 3,200 hp (2.4 MW)
- Tractive effort: Continuous: 38,500 lbf (17,500 kgf) @26 mph (42 km/h)
- Factor of adh.: 4.472
Career
- Operators: Amtrak; Amtrak California
- Numbers: 500–519 (Amtrak); 2051–2052 (Caltrans)
- Nicknames: Pepsi Cans
- Locale: United States
- Delivered: 1991
- Disposition: Operational, used primarily for yard switching and backup motive power

The GE Dash 8-32BWH, also known as the P32-8BWH, B32-8WH, or P32-8, is a diesel-electric locomotive used by Amtrak in passenger train service, based on the GE Dash 8 Series of freight train locomotives. Built in 1991, they were the first locomotives purchased to replace the EMD F40PH. Amtrak originally used the Dash 8's on mainline trains but later used them largely for switching in yards, only being used on mainline trains when newer GE Genesis locomotives were unavailable. As of 2023, 16 of the original 20 remain in service with Amtrak, including two owned by Caltrans for use on Amtrak California services.

== Design ==
The Dash 8-32BWH operates in a diesel-electric configuration that uses DC to power the traction motors, the 7FDL-V12 diesel engine produces 3,200 hp (2,400 kW) at 1047 rpm. When providing head end power to the train, the engine is speed locked to 900 rpm. Power output to the traction motors is 2,700 hp (2,000 kW) when running in HEP mode with a 0 kW HEP load. Traction horsepower decreases to 1,685 hp (1,257 kW) when providing the maximum 800 kW (1,100 hp) HEP load to the train.

The Dash 8-32BWH has a 74:29 gear ratio, resulting in a maximum operating speed of 103 mph (166 km/h) in passenger operation.

== History ==
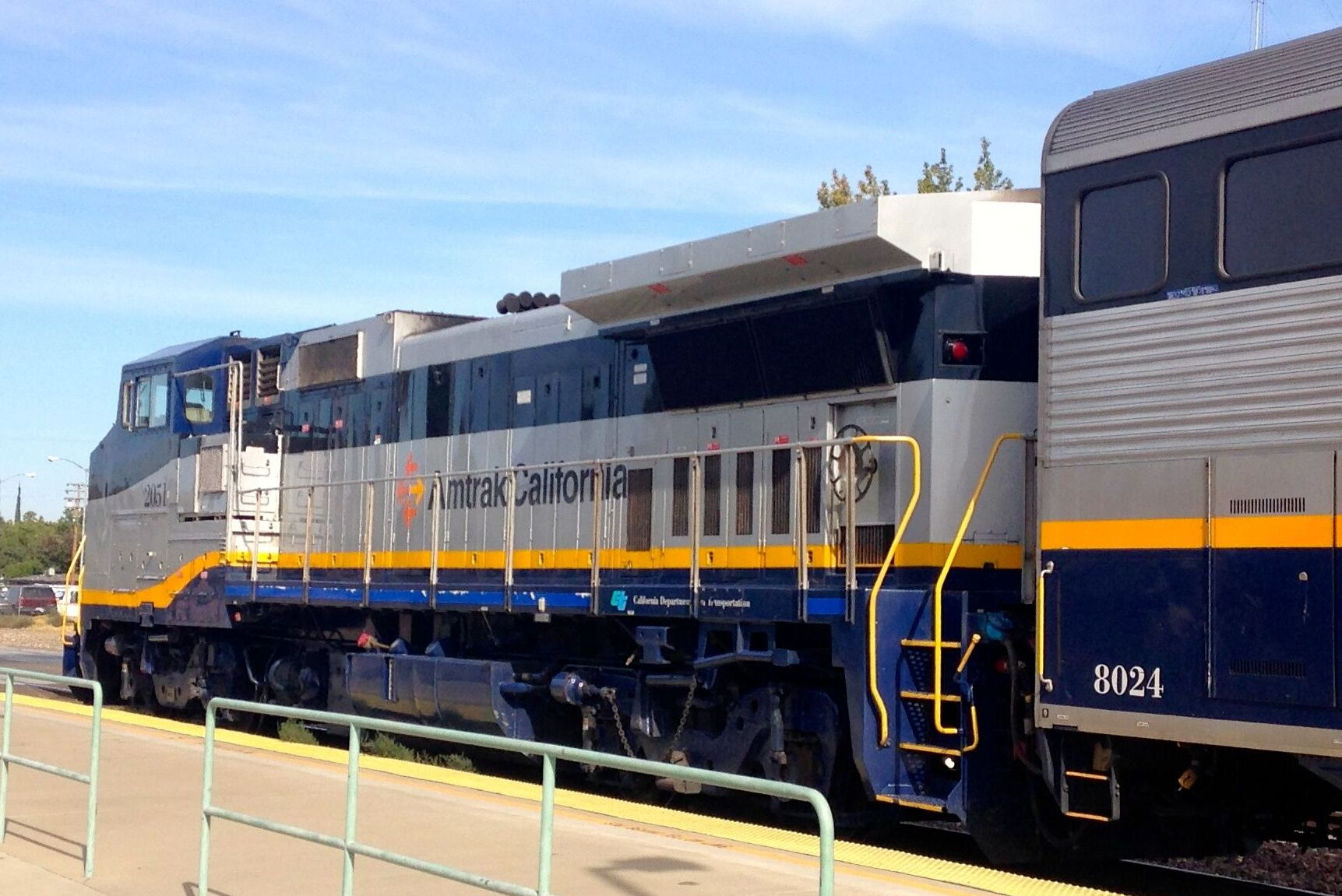
Amtrak California (CDTX) locomotive #2051 pulling the San Joaquins through Merced, California.

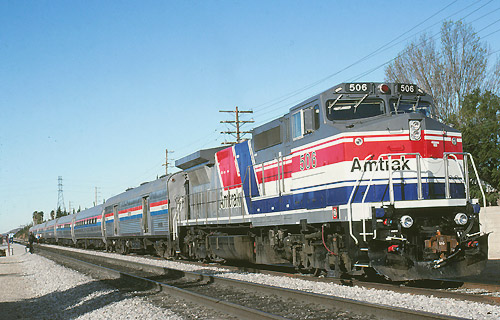
Amtrak 506 in the original "Pepsi Can" livery with the San Diegan in 1992

By 1990, Amtrak was looking to supplement its EMD F40PH fleet, which was beginning to show its age. Though Amtrak first explored the experimental EMD F69PHAC, cost concerns prompted the company to pursue a modification of an existing freight locomotive instead. Twenty GE Dash 8-32BWH locomotives were delivered to Amtrak in 1991, numbered 500 through 519 (two were funded by the California Department of Transportation for use in that state). The locomotives were built by GE Transportation as a modification of their existing Dash 8-32B with the addition of head-end power for supplying passenger cars, a comfort cab, and a number of changes to locomotive internals to meet Amtrak's requirements for weight and performance. To provide enough room for a second alternator (to support head-end power generation) these locomotives were built on the frame of a Dash 8-40BW.

Amtrak decided its new locomotives should have a new paint scheme, and in the process considered over 100 possible designs. The locomotives were delivered in a wide-striped red, white and blue livery, which angled upward across the middle of the body. The similarity to the design of Pepsi packaging led to the units being nicknamed "Pepsi Cans". By 2023, all units had been repainted into a standard Amtrak scheme.

Originally used across the Amtrak system on passenger trains, the fleet has since been primarily relegated to yard switching (mainly in Los Angeles, Oakland, Chicago, and Miami), but locomotives are sometimes called upon to pull mainline trains when a locomotive from Amtrak's fleet of GE Genesis and Siemens Charger units are unavailable. Amtrak adopted the Genesis rather than the Dash 8-32BWH to fully replace its F40PH fleet, which was designed specifically for Amtrak as an all-new passenger locomotive. As of 2023, 16 Dash 8-32BWH locomotives remain in active service with Amtrak, which has held on to them for their reliability and ease of maintenance despite their age.

Two of the locomotives, 501 and 502, were sold to the California Department of Transportation (Caltrans). The locomotives were renumbered 2051 and 2052, and received the Amtrak California paint scheme. They are used on the Gold Runner and Capitol Corridor trains.
