= GE Dash 8 Series =

Diesel-electric locomotives

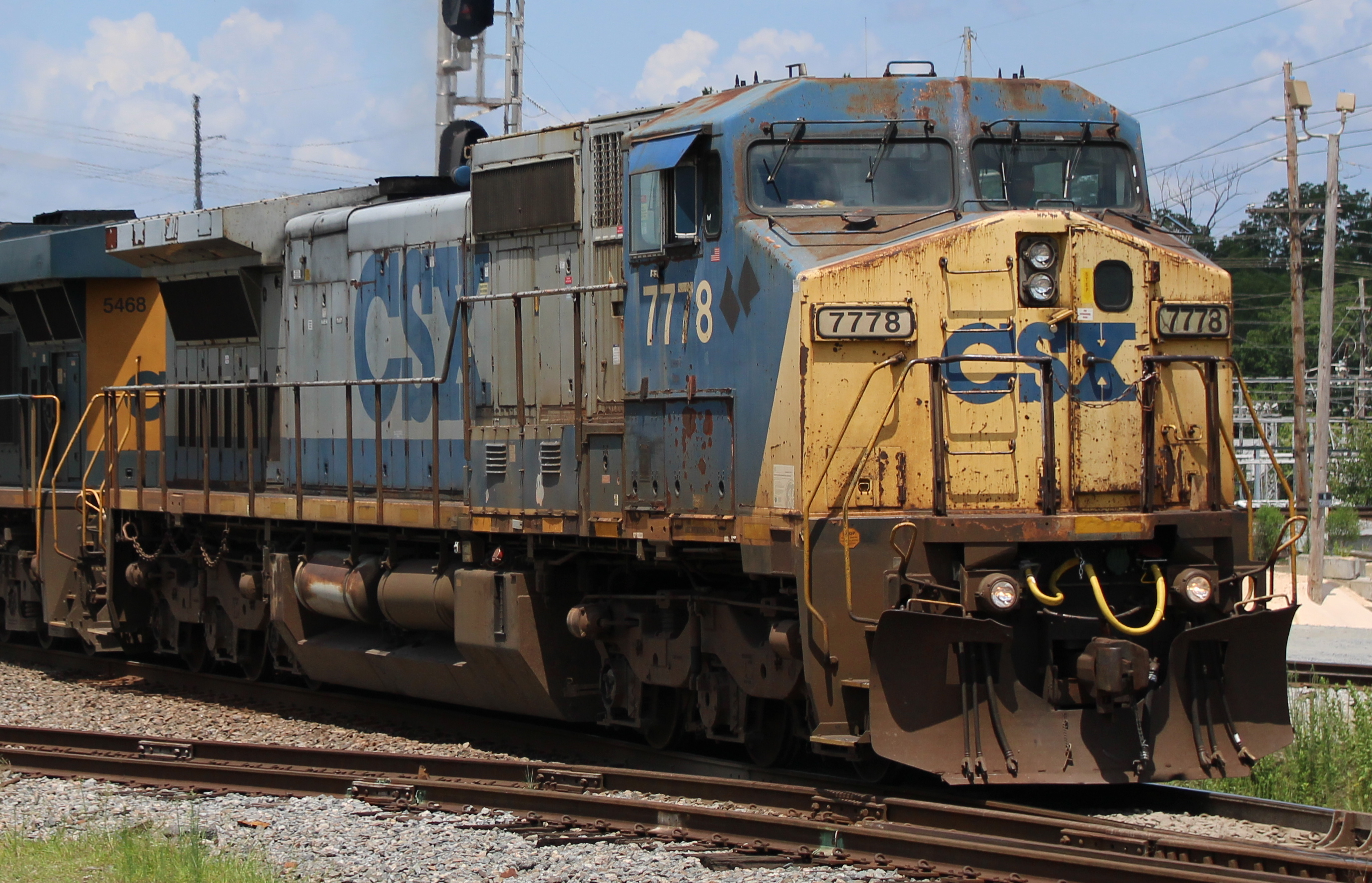
- CSX GE C40-8W no. 7778
Type and origin
- Power type: Diesel-electric
- Builder: GE Transportation
- Build date: 1983–1994
Specifications
- Configuration
  - AAR: B-B (B32-8, B39-8, B40-8, B40-8W) C-C (C30-8, C32-8, C39-8, C40-8, C40-8M, C40-8W, C41-8W, C44-8W)
- Gauge: 4 ft 8 1/2 in (1,435 mm); 5 ft 3 in (1,600 mm), Brazil
- Length: 66 ft 4 in (20.22 m) (B40-8W) 70 ft 8 in (21.54 m) (C40-8W)
- Fuel capacity: 3,150 US gal (11,900 L; 2,620 imp gal) (B40-8W) 4,600 US gal (17,400 L; 3,830 imp gal) (C40-8W)
- Prime mover: GE 7FDL
- Engine type: 4-stroke diesel engine
- Aspiration: Turbocharged
- Cylinders: V12 or V16
Performance figures
- Power output: 3,000 hp (2,240 kW) (C30-8) 3,200 hp (2,390 kW) (B32-8, C32-8) 3,900 hp (2,910 kW) (B39-8, C39-8) 4,000 hp (2,980 kW) (B40-8, B40-8W, C40-8, C40-8M, C40-8W) 4,100 hp (3,060 kW) (C41-8W) 4,400 hp (3,280 kW) (C44-8W)
Career
- Operators: Various
- Locale: North America, Brazil

The Dash 8 Series is a line of diesel-electric freight locomotives built by GE Transportation. It replaced the Dash 7 Series in the mid-1980s, and was superseded by the Dash 9 Series for freight usage and the Genesis Series for passenger usage in the mid-1990s.

All models of the Dash 8 Series are powered by a 16- or 12-cylinder, turbocharged, GE 7FDL 4-stroke diesel engine.

== Specifications ==
The design of the Dash 8 Series is based upon that of the Dash 7 Series. The biggest changes introduced during the production of the Dash 8 Series were the first use of a microprocessor-equipped engine control unit in a diesel locomotive, and the adoption of a modular system in the construction of the vehicle body.

The Dash 8 locomotive bodies were assembled from several modules, creating a combination to fit the length of the chassis. On models with a traditional narrow short hood, the part of the equipment room immediately behind the cab is taller than the top of the rounded cab roof, giving those models a distinctive appearance. On all models, that part of the equipment room houses the cooling fans for the dynamic braking system.

Traction motors of Dash 8 locomotives were powered by direct current.

== Construction history ==
The Dash 8 prototype was completed in 1984. Manufacture of the improved production units started in earnest in 1987. Early versions of the Dash 8 were manufactured on the Dash 7 production line, but their general appearance was different. The Dash 8-40C, introduced in 1987, featured improved reliability.

== Nomenclature ==
The naming of the Dash 8 Series, and that of its various models, corresponded initially with that of its predecessor, the Dash 7. So, an example is "B32-8," which means it is a B-B configured 3,200 hp (2,390 kW) Dash 8 Series locomotive.

After product improvements were made to the line in 1987, the official designations for models in this series changed to "Dash 8...", as shown below. However, for simplicity many railroads decided to use designations which follow the pattern of the Dash 7 line. For example, the Dash 8-40C is usually rendered as "C40-8".

The "W" suffix used for some models indicates the then-optional wide-nose "North American" safety cab.

== Four axle models ==
=== Common features ===
Specifications common to all Dash 8 Series four axle models are as follows:

- AAR wheel arrangement: B-B
- Prime mover: GE V-type 7FDL-16 V16 engine, 7FDL-12 V12 for B32 models

=== Dash 8-32B (B32-8) ===
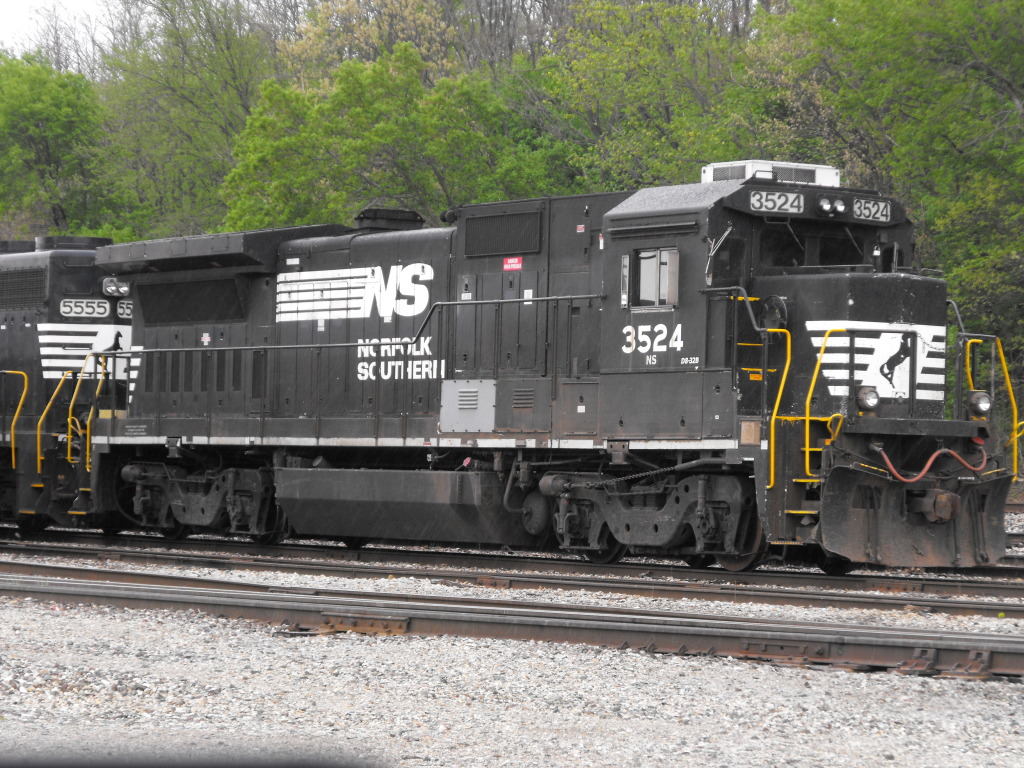
A Norfolk Southern B32-8 at Hinman Yard.

This model was manufactured between 1984 and 1989, with 49 examples of the model built for North American railroads. All but 4 of these units were ordered by Norfolk Southern. The others were 3 units ordered by Burlington Northern Railroad, and a GE demonstrator unit.

- Prime mover: GE 12-cylinder V-type 7FDL-12 four stroke diesel engine
- Power output: 3,150 hp (2,350 kW)

=== Dash 8-36B (B36-8) ===
This model, a one-off, was the original Dash 8 prototype, built in 1983.

- Power output: 3,600 hp (2,680 kW)

=== Dash 8-39B (B39-8) ===
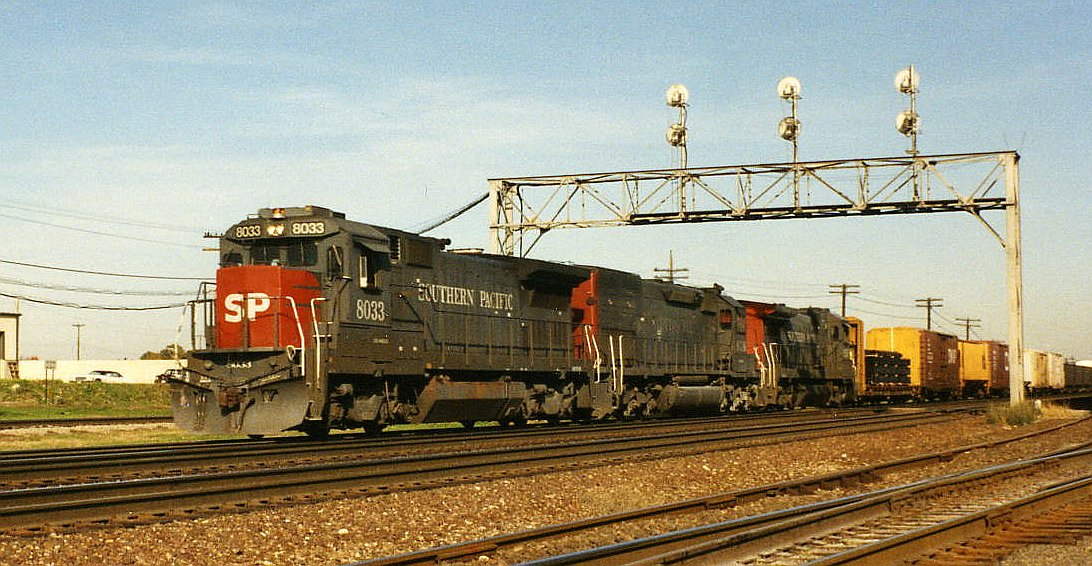
A Southern Pacific B39-8 leads a westbound train through Eola, Illinois (just east of Aurora).

A total of 145 examples of this model were manufactured from 1984. Its external appearance is almost the same as that of the later Dash 8-40B model, with the obvious exception of the trucks.

The first three Dash 8-39Bs were built for Atchison, Topeka and Santa Fe Railway (ATSF). A fourth example of the model, a GE demonstrator designated as a Dash 8-39BE (or B39-8E), was converted from the original Dash 8 prototype.

There were also two much larger groups of this model: 102 Dash 8-39BEs were fabricated for Locomotive Management Services (Reporting mark: LMX) and placed on long term lease to Burlington Northern Railroad.

The remaining 40 were built for the Southern Pacific Railroad.

- Power output: 3,900 hp (2,910 kW)

=== Dash 8-40B (B40-8) ===
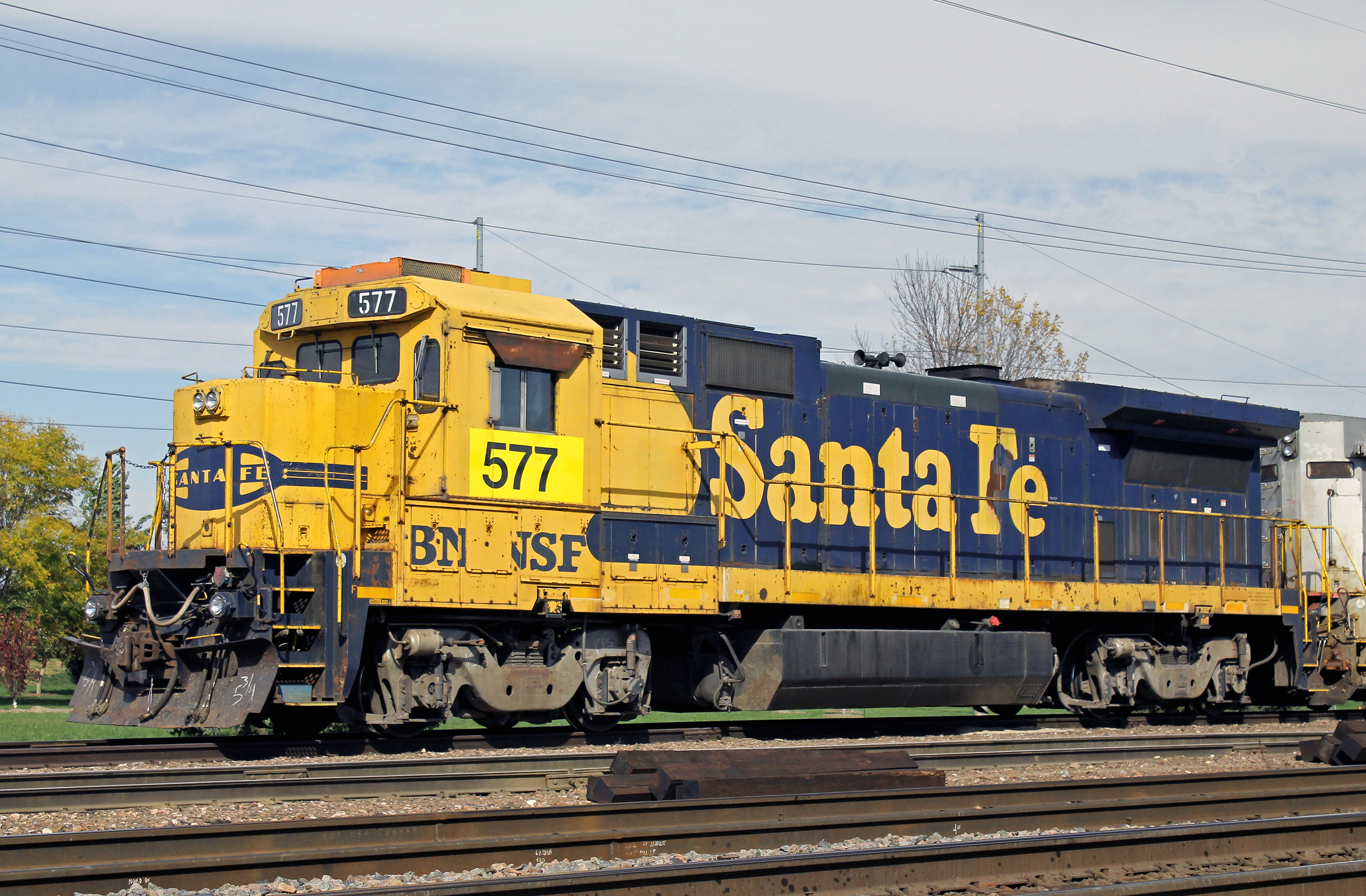
A former Santa Fe B40-8B, now belonging to BNSF, no. #577.

In 1988 and 1989, a total of 150 units of this model were produced.

Substantial orders for the model came from ATSF (40 units), Conrail (30 units), New York, Susquehanna and Western Railway (24 units), and the model's biggest customer, St. Louis Southwestern Railway (54 units).

There were also small orders from Providence and Worcester Railroad (4 units), the United States Department of Energy (Savannah River Site), and a GE demonstrator unit.

The passenger variant of GE Dash 8-40B that was GE Dash 8-40BP from P40DC, P32AC-DM and P42DC

- Power output: 4,000 hp (2,980 kW)

=== Dash 8-40BW (B40-8W) ===
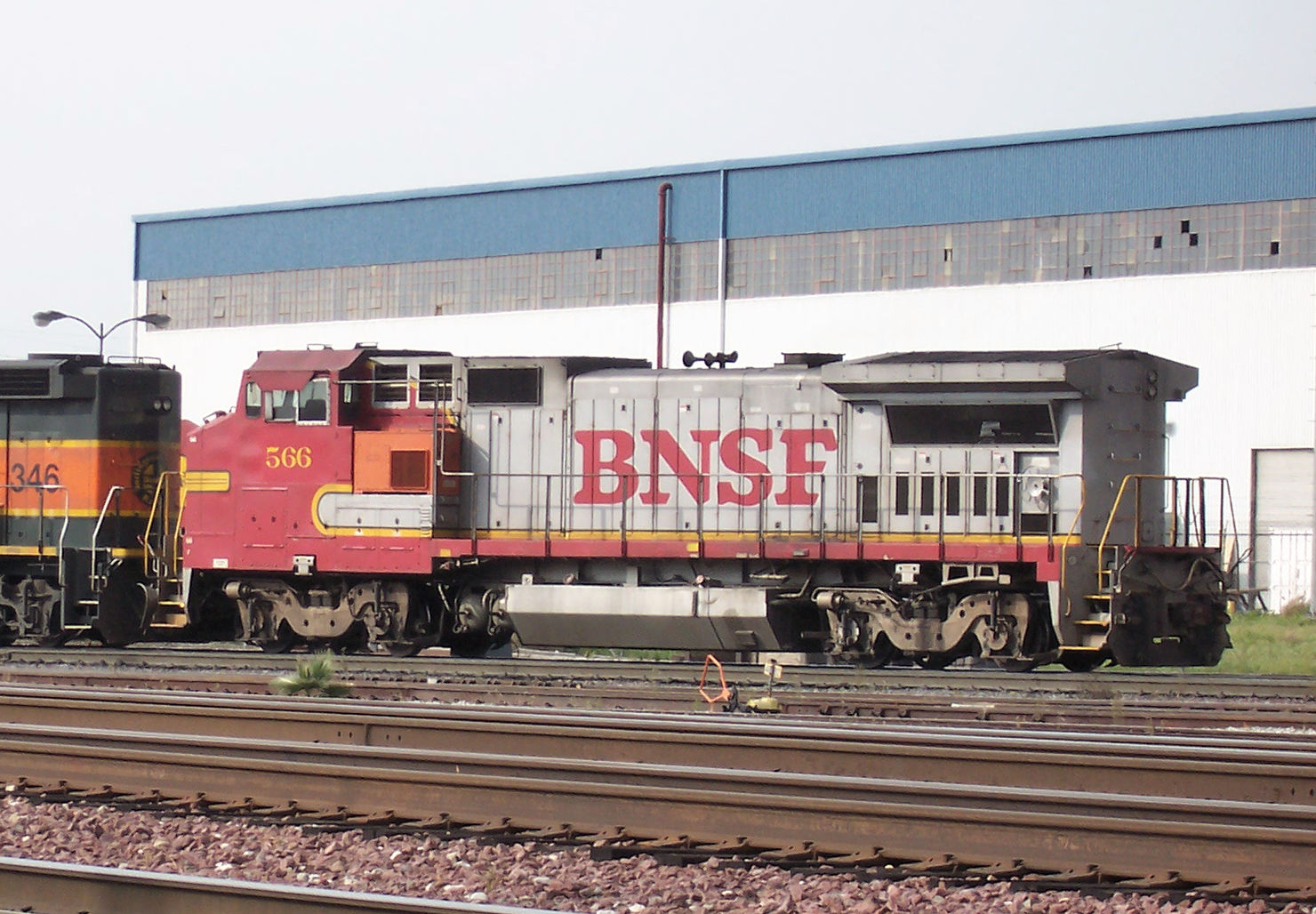
A BNSF B40-8BW in former ATSF livery.

Eighty three examples of this model were built for ATSF in the early 1990s. ATSF was the only railroad to order it. There was also one GE prototype and testbed, rebuilt from the prototype B39-8E.

The "W" suffix to this model's name indicates that it differs from the B40-8 in having a "wide nose" safety cab.

GE was almost commissioned by ATSF to make a B unit (cabless booster unit) version of this model, but because the price would have been the same for B40-8Ws with cabs or without, ATSF decided to order units with cabs only.

All of ATSF's B40-8Ws became part of BNSF, and many were later repainted into one of BNSF's liveries.

Some have since been sold to other operators.

- Power output: 4,000 hp (2,980 kW) 7FDL-16 turbocharged diesel engine

=== Dash 8-32BWH (B32-8WH) ===
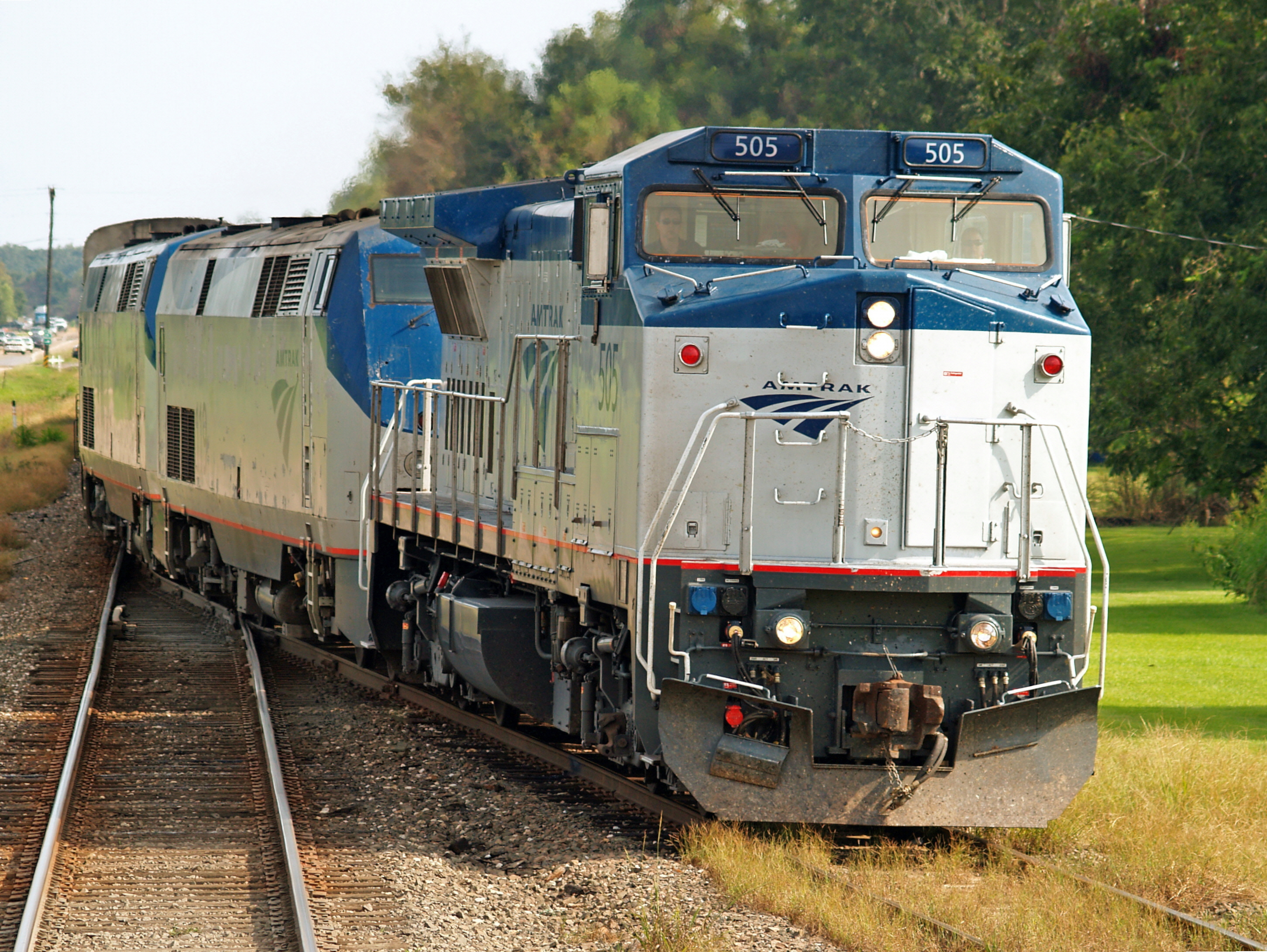
Amtrak No. 505 leading the Sunset Limited through Cade, Louisiana

A total of 20 units of this type were built, with the last units being delivered in December 1991. All were built specifically for Amtrak and numbered 500 through 519. They were nicknamed "Pepsi Cans" and "Hockey Sticks" by many railfans, due to being originally painted in a wide-striped red, white, and blue livery. Since the most recent overhaul, however, the locomotives now have the current Phase V blue-silver livery with the current "wave" logo.

They were also the first locomotives that Amtrak purchased to replace the EMD F40PH before the introduction of the GE Genesis series locomotives in 1993. The fleet has since been primarily relegated to yard switching (mainly in Los Angeles, Oakland, Chicago, and Miami), but locomotives are sometimes called upon to pull mainline trains when locomotives from Amtrak's fleet of GE Genesis and Siemens Charger units are unavailable.

Two of the units, Amtrak numbers #501 and #502, were sold to the California Department of Transportation (CDTX) In 1994. The locomotives were renumbered #2051 and #2052, and received the Amtrak California paint scheme. They are currently being used on the State-Supported Gold Runner and Capital Corridor trains.

- Power output: 3,200 hp (2.4 MW)

== Six axle models ==
=== Common features ===
Specifications common to all Dash 8 Series six axle models, except where stated, are as follows:

- AAR wheel arrangement: C-C
- Prime mover: GE V-type 7FDL-16 V16 engine, 7FDL-12 V12 for C32 models
- Maximum speed: 68 mph (109 km/h)

=== Dash 8-32C (C32-8) ===
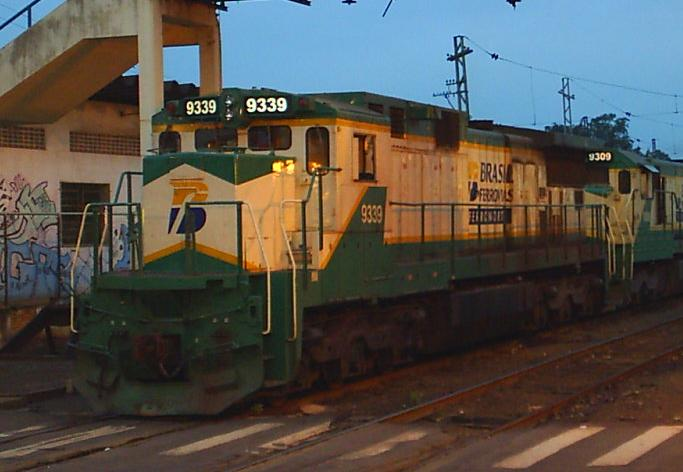
The BF C32-8, ex-Conrail, 2007.

This was one of the earliest models in the Dash 8 Series. Only 10 of the model were built, in 1984. All of them were delivered to Conrail.

Initially, these units were painted in Conrail's standard blue livery. In 1997, Conrail assigned all 10 of them to "Ballast Express" service, and they were repainted into a gray version of the Quality scheme.

One C32-8 was eventually bought by Brasil Ferrovias (BF), after being retired by Conrail. However, this unit developed problems with its electronics, and was therefore decommissioned to supply parts for the mechanically similar C30-7As operated on the Cutralle–Quintela railroad.

- Prime mover: GE 12-cylinder V-type 7FDL-12 four stroke diesel engine
- Power output: 3,200 hp (2,390 kW)

=== Dash 8-30C (C30-8) ===
This locomotive was one of the unique models in the Dash 8 Series. Only 15 of the model were built, in 1990. All of them were delivered to Australian National and built by UGL Rail.

=== Dash 8-39C (C39-8) ===
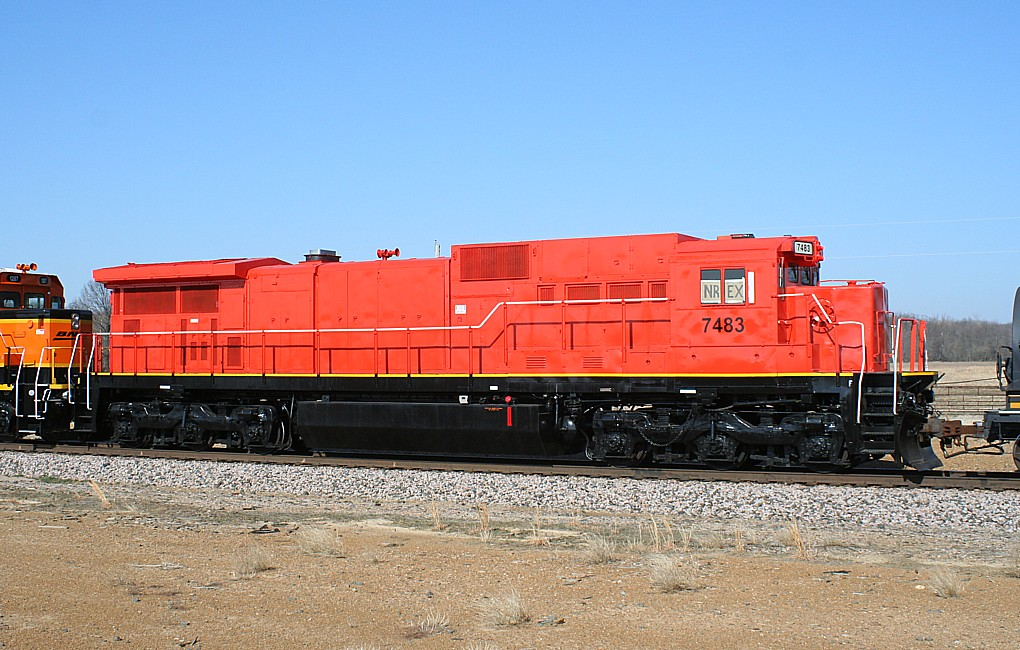
An NREC C39-8.

Between 1984 and 1987, a total of 161 examples of this model were produced for two North American railroads: Norfolk Southern and Conrail.

An initial batch of 114 of the standard version of this model was built for Norfolk Southern, which then ordered a batch of 25 examples of the C39-8E (Enhanced) model, with a carbody similar to that of the C40-8.

Conrail ordered 22 of the standard version. After the Conrail split in 1999, 13 units of this order went to Norfolk Southern and the remaining 9 units went to CSX.

- Power output: 3,900 hp (2,910 kW)

=== Dash 8-40C (C40-8) ===
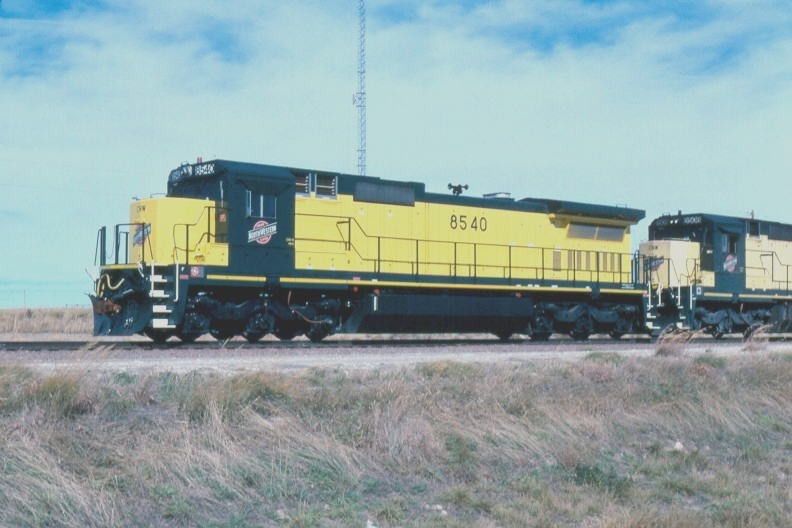
C&NW C40-8 #8540.

This was the first model of any locomotive series to be fitted with microprocessor-equipped engine control units. A total of 581 examples of the model were manufactured between 1987 and 1992.

The C40-8 has a traditional narrow short hood, but otherwise its external appearance is almost the same as that of the later Dash 8-40CW model.

The most important customer for this model was UP, which ordered 257 of them.

Other large orders for the model came from Chicago and North Western Transportation Company (77 units), Conrail (25), CSX (147) and Norfolk Southern (75).

The remaining four units were supplied to Estrada de Ferro Carajás of Brazil.

- Power output: 4,000 hp (2,980 kW)

=== Dash 8-40CM (C40-8M) ===
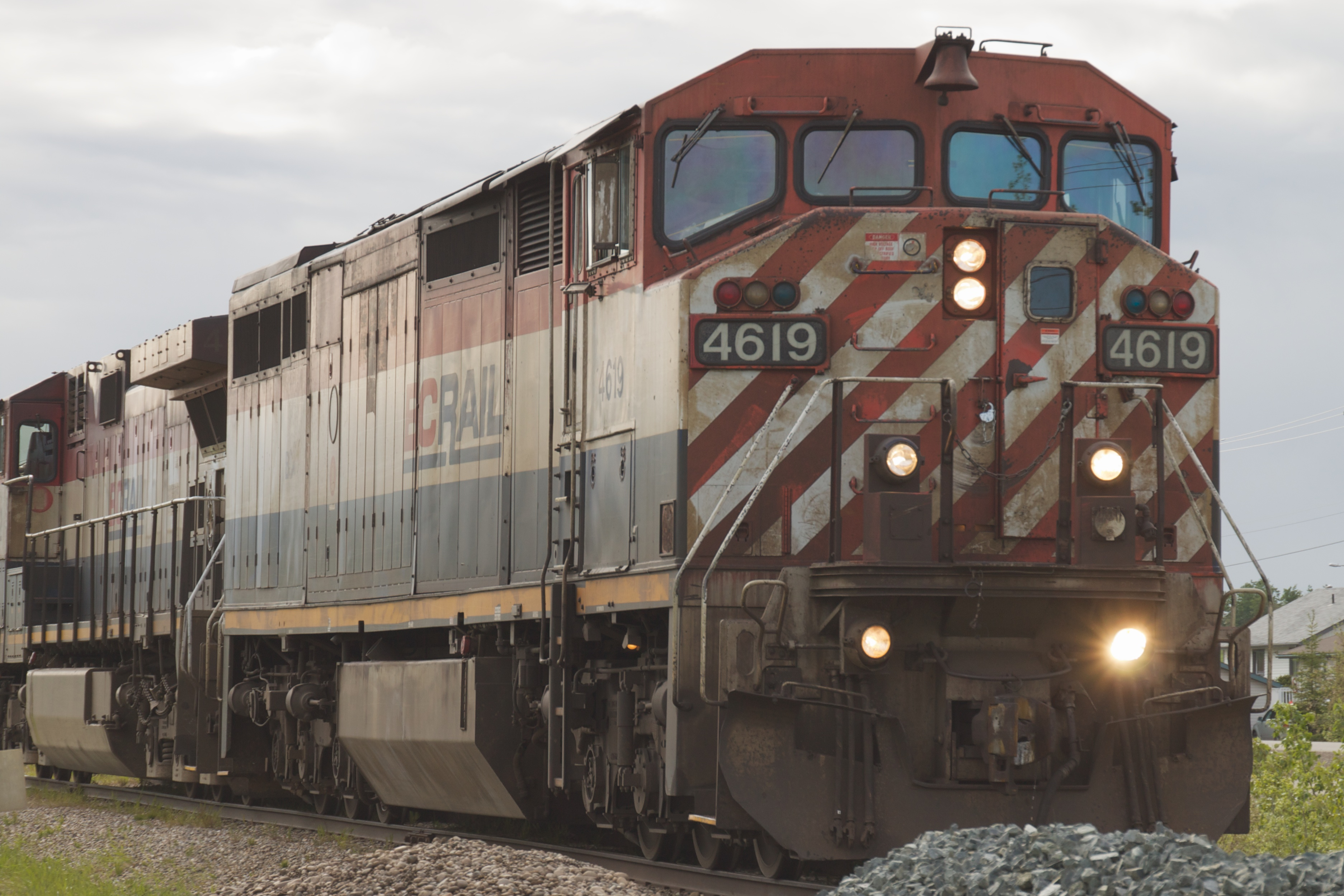
A BC Rail C40-8M.

Mechanically identical to the Dash 8-40C (see above) and Dash 8-40CW (see below), this model was constructed between 1990 and 1994 only for Canadian railways, with a production total of 84 units.

The model is distinguished from the Dash 8-40CW by the addition of a full-width cowl body and the use of a Canada-specific nose and windshield configuration.

BC Rail ordered 26 examples of the model, Canadian National ordered 55, and Quebec North Shore and Labrador Railway acquired the remaining three.

- Power output: 4,000 hp (2,980 kW)

=== Dash 8-40CW (C40-8W) ===
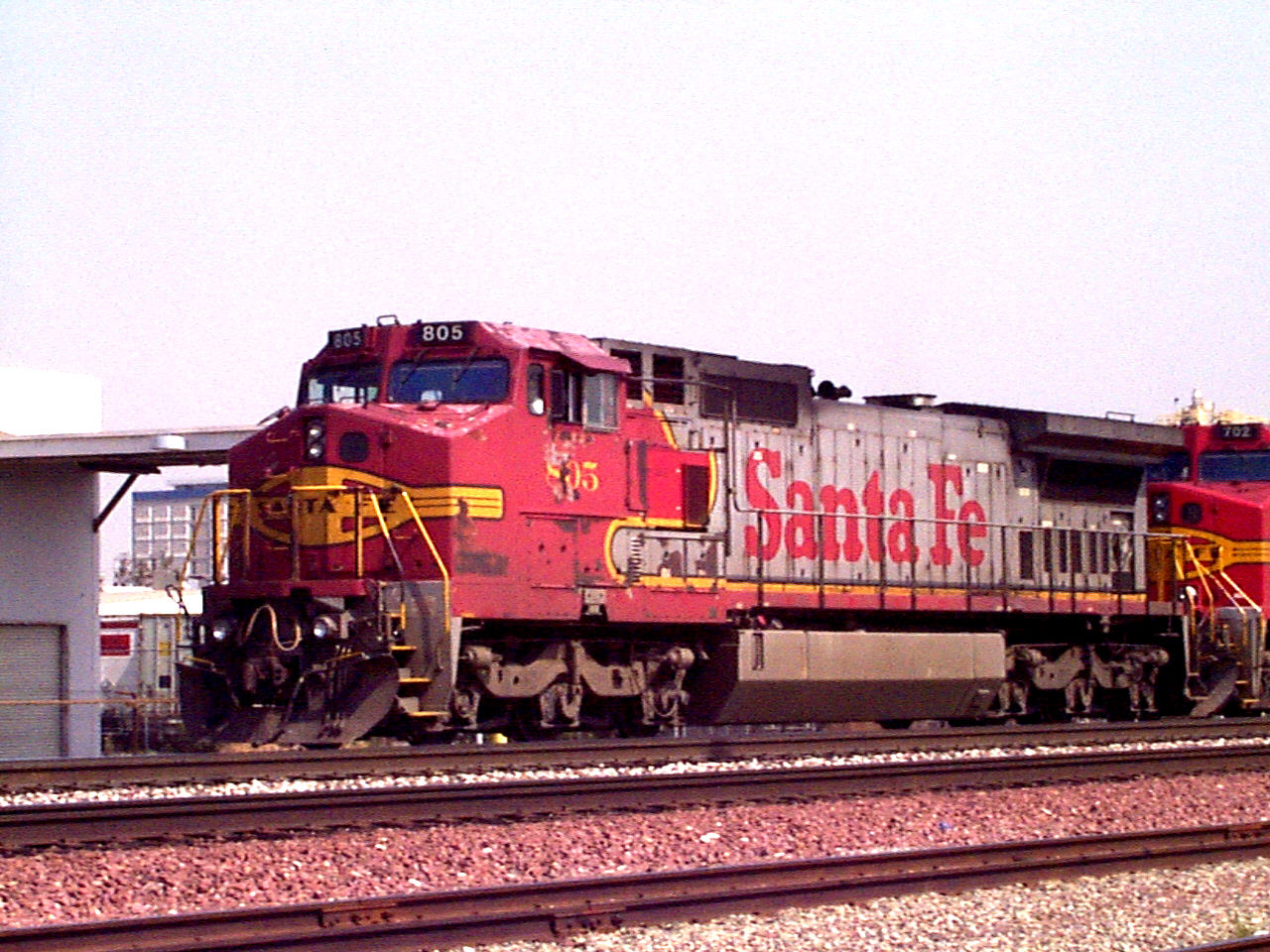
ATSF C40-8W, #805, in Los Angeles.

Early versions of this model differ from the Dash 8-40C only in having a "wide" or "safety" cab. A total of 756 examples of the model were built, with the first being delivered to Union Pacific in 1990.

The C40-8W was continuously upgraded over the course of its production. Later model Conrail units were built with split cooling systems for the turbocharger intercooler and engine cooling (previous Dash 8 series had both on the same cooling system).

The units delivered to Conrail in 1993 and 1994 were equipped with GE's Integrated Function Displays (IFD).

Some of the C40-8Ws operated by Conrail were lease units owned by LMSX. The other railroads that operated C40-8Ws as original owners were ATSF, CSX, and Union Pacific.

- Power output: 4,000 hp (2,980 kW)

=== Dash 8-41CW (C41-8W) ===
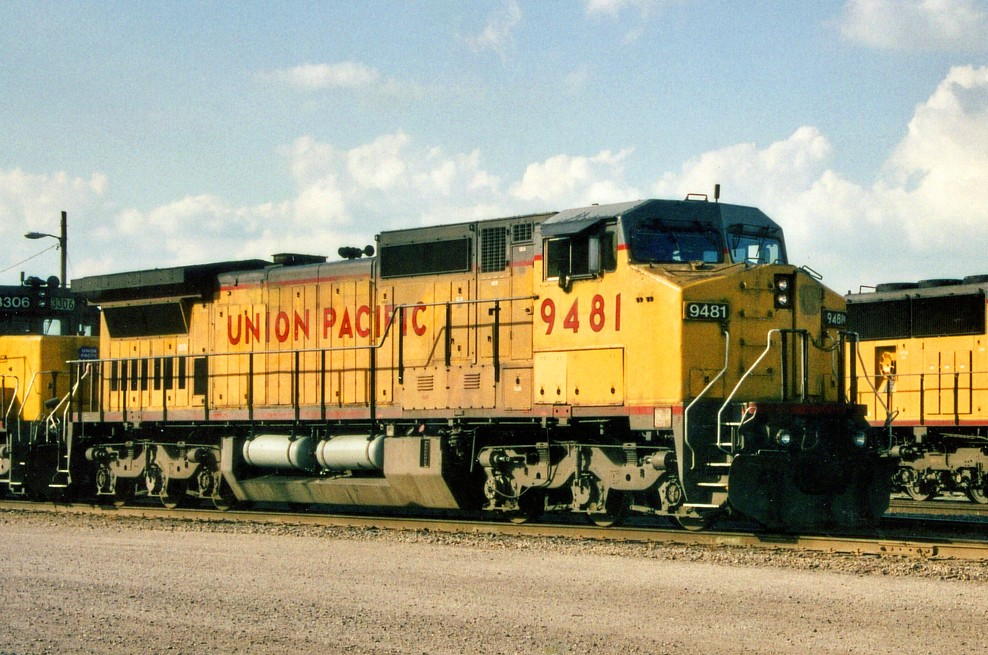
UP C41-8W, #9481.

This model is a variation of the C40-8W with the same 16-cylinder engine uprated to 4,135 hp (3,080 kW).

A total of 154 C41-8Ws were produced between 1993 and 1994 for both UP and ATSF.

Some Dash 8-40CW units were similarly uprated to Dash 8-41CW standard by the railroads.

- Power output: 4,135 hp (3,080 kW)

=== Dash 8-44CW (C44-8W) ===
A total of 53 examples of this model were built in 1993–1994, all of them were owned by CSX numbered 9000-9052. This was the preproduction version of the Dash 9 series containing its innards but having an extended Dash 8 carbody (with the exception of the first three locomotives). They were all derated to 4,000 hp, and redesignated as CW40-9s. The majority of the fleet was retired and stored between 2017 and 2023. Only a handful of the original 53 remain in service as of 2026. It carried pre dash 9 specifications, with upgraded split-cooling system, dynamic brake grid, electronics, control systems, and updated traction motors.

- Power output: 4,400 hp (3,280 kW), later 4,000 hp (2,980 kW)

== Preservation ==
Some GE Dash-8 types have been saved and preserved, the two most notable ones being Atchison, Topeka and Santa Fe B40-8Ws 534 and 537. 534 is currently in the hands of BUGX/New Mexico Heritage Rail and is being restored as of 10/2026. 537 is operational and has run an excursion with Railroading Heritage of Midwest America.

BC Rail C40-8M 4618 is preserved at the Alberta Railway Museum and has been made operational.

CN C40-8W 2150, former ATSF 830, has been donated to the BC Institute of Technology for their railway training program.

CSX C40-8W 7812, which once wore the Spirit of America livery for the George Bush campaign, has been sold to CaterParrott Railnet. It is unknown what they plan to do with it.

== See also ==
- GE Dash 8-32BWH – a passenger locomotive model based on the Dash 8 Series
- List of GE locomotives
- Dash 8.5-40CW
