= GE Dash 8.5-40CW =

Former diesel-electric locomotive

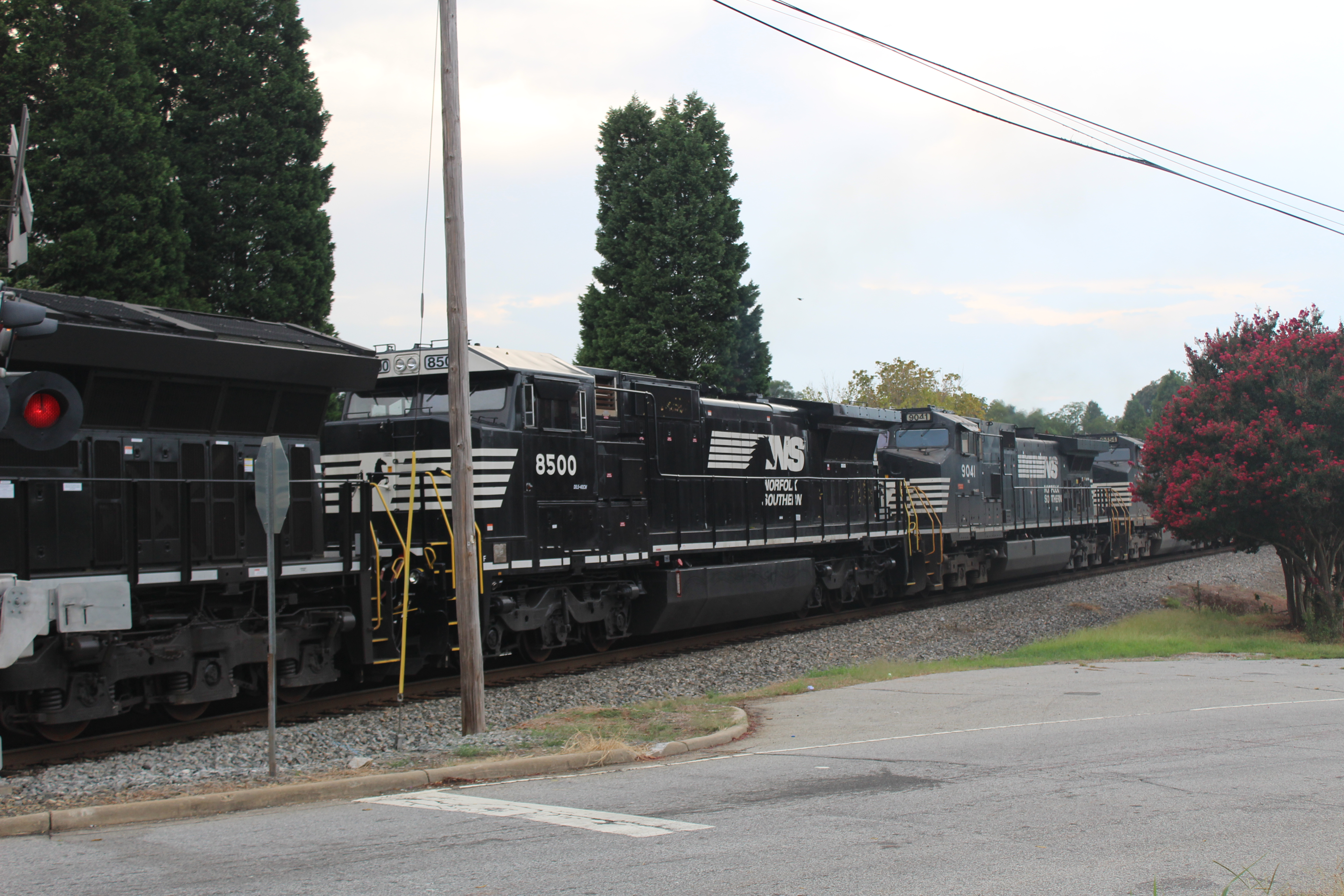
- Norfolk Southern GE D8.5-40CW no. 8500 trailing at Salisbury, North Carolina.
Type and origin
- Power type: Diesel-electric
- Builder: GE Transportation Systems/Norfolk Southern
- Model: Dash 8.5-40CW
- Build date: 2012 – April 2016
- Total produced: 14
- Rebuilder: Norfolk Southern
Specifications
- Configuration
  - AAR: C-C
  - UIC: Co′Co′
  - Commonwealth: Co-Co
- Gauge: 4 ft 8 1/2 in (1,435 mm) standard gauge
- Trucks: GE HiAd
- Wheel diameter: 40 in (1,016 mm)
- Length: 70 ft 8 in (21.54 m)
- Width: 10 ft 2 in (3.10 m)
- Height: 15 ft 4 in (4.67 m)
- Fuel capacity: 5,000 gallons
- Lubricant cap.: 410 US gal (1,600 L; 340 imp gal)
- Coolant cap.: 380 US gal (1,400 L; 320 imp gal)
- Prime mover: GE 7FDL-16
- Engine type: four stroke cycle V16 diesel engine
- Aspiration: Turbocharged
- Alternator: GE GMG197
- Traction motors: GE GE752-AH DC traction motors
- Cylinders: 16
- Train brakes: CCB 26
Performance figures
- Maximum speed: 70 miles per hour (110 km/h)
- Power output: 4,000 hp (2,983 kW)
Career
- Operators: Norfolk Southern
- Number in class: 14
- Numbers: NS 8500–8513
- Locale: Eastern United States
- First run: 2012
- Last run: July 14, 2016 (NS 8505); April 2020 (Other 13 units)
- Preserved: None
- Current owner: Norfolk Southern
- Disposition: All scrapped

The GE Dash 8.5-40CW was a 6-axle a 4,000 hp (2,800 kW) diesel-electric locomotive originally built by GE Transportation Systems, rebuilt by Norfolk Southern at its shops in Roanoke, Virginia. The first locomotive started rebuild 2012, with eleven more being rebuilt until 2016.

The locomotive is designed to meet Tier 2 emissions standards. All of the Dash 8.5-40CW's excluding 8500 and 8505 have been rebuilt with the Norfolk Southern-designed wide-nose RLS cab which meets current FRA crashworthiness standards. 8500 was rebuilt with an SD60E style Norfolk Southern-designed Crescent cab while 8505 was rebuilt with an ES44AC style GE cab. They have been equipped with the Traction and Engine Control Unit (TECU) from TMV Control Systems, upgraded from Manual Fuel Injection (MFI), to Electronic Fuel Injection (EFI), and equipped with NS-designed split cooling system. The rebuild also includes the installation of locomotive speed limiter (LSL), and cab signals. The traction motors were upgraded from GE752-AG to GE752-AH. They were also equipped with CCB 26 electronic air braking system, and an electric parking brake. PTC has also been installed.

In April 2016, the program was canceled, due to Norfolk Southern experiencing many problems with the first of the locomotives. As a result, all 9 of the operational locomotives were added to the active roster in "as is" condition for testing. By August 2016, 5 out of 10 completed were stored, but still on the active roster. Norfolk Southern later decided finish the units that have started rebuilding, with a total of 14 units being built. By April 2020, the entire fleet was stored indefinitely.

== History ==
The units that have been rebuilt were all Norfolk Southern GE Dash 8-40C's with some being ex-Conrail. They were built in the late 1980s and were getting old and some had deteriorating cabs; one of the primary reasons for the rebuilds. The rebuilds also include emissions upgrades with an engine rebuild and upgrade with new systems, such as electronic fuel injection. The units are also getting new computer systems to improve efficiency.

On July 14, 2016, NS 8505 was wrecked in Chattanooga, Tennessee and was later scrapped on site.

Due to many problems with the locomotives, the program was discontinued in 2016, and the remaining Dash 8's were phased out with the delivery of new ET44AC and ES44AC locomotives in mid-2016, and also for NS to focus more on the AC44C6M rebuilding program; the last remaining Dash 8-40C's on the roster were retired in March 2017. The last locomotive to be rebuilt as part of the program was unit 8513, which was completed in June 2018.

In April 2020, Norfolk Southern retired all the 13 remaining Dash 8.5-40CWs. All 13 locomotives were stored in pending disposition, and then presumed scrapped. None of these locomotives survive today (either in service or preservation).
