= List of GE locomotives =

Locomotives built by General Electric

The following is a list of locomotives produced by GE Transportation Systems, a subsidiary of Wabtec. All were/are built at Fort Worth, Texas or Erie, Pennsylvania, in the United States. Most (except the electrics, the switchers, the AC6000CW, and the Evolution series) are powered by various versions of GE's own FDL diesel prime mover, based on a Cooper Bessemer design and manufactured at Grove City, Pennsylvania. GE is one of the largest locomotive manufacturing companies. This list includes locomotives built solely for export outside of North America.

== Freight locomotives ==
=== Early locomotives, switchers and special purpose ===
==== Switchers ====
Model designation	Build year	Total produced	AAR wheel arrangement	Prime mover	Power output	Image
20-ton Boxcab	1938	5	B	Cummins	150 hp (110 kW)	
23-ton Boxcab	1939	6	B	Cummins	150 hp (110 kW)	
23-ton	1941	29	B-B	Cummins	150 hp (110 kW)	
25-ton	1941–1974	510	B	Cummins	150 hp (110 kW)	General Electric 25-ton switcher – Rio Negro-PR-Brasil
35-ton			B			Narragansett Pier Railroad 38
43-ton			B-B			
44-ton	1940–1956	386	B-B	Caterpillar D17000 × 2 (most); Hercules DFXD × 2 (11); Buda 6DH1742 × 2 (10); Caterpillar D342 × 2 (last 4)	380–400 hp (280–300 kW)	General Electric 44-ton switcher—Duluth, GA
45-ton	1940–1956		B-B	Cummins × 2	300 hp (220 kW)	A GE 45-ton switcher at the Texas Transportation Museum.
GE 45-Ton switcher "Drop Cab"	1944–1949	103	B-B			
GE 45-Ton switcher "Off-Center Cab"	1941	9	B-B	Cooper Bessemer EN6		
GE 46-Ton switcher "Drop Cab"	1955	3	B-B			
47-ton "Drop Cab"	1943–1953	58	B-B			A GE 47-ton switcher at Tokyo, Japan.
50-ton			B-B			A GE 50-ton switcher at Newport News Shipbuilding.
GE 55-Ton switcher "Off-Center Cab"	1931	7	B-B	Ingersoll Rand 300		
GE 57-Ton switcher "Off-Center Cab"	1935	1	B-B	Cooper Bessemer ENL6		
60-ton "Boxcab"	1928–1930	2	B-B	Ingersoll Rand 300		
60-ton "Off-Center Cab"	1935–1941	10	B-B	Ingersoll Rand 300 (1); Ingersoll Rand 400 (2); Cooper Bessemer EN8 (3); Cooper Bessemer ENL8 (4)		
GE 61-Ton switcher "Off-Center Cab"	1937	1	B-B	Cooper Bessemer EN6		
65-ton			B-B			
GE 68-Ton switcher "Off-Center Cab"	1939	2	B-B	Cooper Bessemer GN6		
70-ton	1947–1955	238	B-B	Cooper-Bessemer FWL-6T	500–660 hp	
75-ton Drop Cab	1944	10	Bo'Bo'	2× Cummins L1 600		
GE 78-ton	1953	10	B-B	ALCO 6-251A	800 hp (600 kW)	
80-ton			B-B	2× Cummins	2× 470 hp	United States Army Transportation Corps (USAX) 1663, a GE 80-ton switcher.
95-ton mixed center and end	1947-1956	45	B-B		600/660 hp	
100-ton "Boxcab"	1928–1930	11	B-B	Ingersoll Rand 300(x2)		
100-ton	1933–1935	7	B-B	Ingersoll Rand 300(x2)		
110-ton			B-B			
125-ton	1939	4	B-B			
126-ton			B-B			
128-ton			B-B			
132-ton	1940	8	B-B			
600-hp center-cab	1933–1935	7	B-B	Ingersoll-Rand 10×12	600 hp (450 kW)	
NH class DEY-2	1936–1937	10	B-B	Cooper-Bessemer 10½×12 GN8 (5); Ingersoll-Rand 10×12 600 (5)	600 hp (450 kW)	
1000-hp center-cab	1937–1940	9	B-B	Cooper-Bessemer GN-6	1,000 hp (750 kW)	
SG10B	1975–1981	124	B-B	7FDL-8	1,100 hp (820 kW)	South African Class 36-000 36-014, Table Bay Harbour, March 21, 2007

===== SL series switchers =====
Beginning in 1974, GE would introduce a more modernized series of industrial switchers known as the SL series. The numbers attached to each model indicate their weight in tons.

Model designation	Build year	Total produced	AAR wheel arrangement	Prime mover	Power output	Image
SL-65	1974–1981 (Note: Most SL-65 units were built from 1974 to 1976, although a few additional units were built as late as 1981.)	19+	B-B			
SL-75 and variants
SL-75	1977–1978	3	B-B			
SL-78	1980	2	B-B			Custom-built for Campinas Tubar in Brazil, broad gauge
SL-80	1976	2	B-B			
SL-82	1980	1	B-B			
SL-85
SL-85	1974–1980s	24+	B-B			
SL-110 and variants
SL-87	1975–1978	2	B-B			
SL-88	1976	2	B-B			Made for Eregli Komevileri Islemes Steel in Turkey
SL-99	1982–1983	37	B-B			
SL-100	1975–1977	9	B-B			
SL-110	1974–1985	67+	B-B			
SL-144 and variants
SL-115	1976–1980	22	B-B			
SL-120	1977	1	B-B			Lukens Steel
SL-125	1976–1980	6	B-B			
SL-130	1976	2	B-B			
SL-132	1981	1	B-B			Italsider - Piombino Works
SL-136	1978	2	B-B			Chicago & North Western
SL-144	1974–1989	22	B-B			

==== General purpose ====
Model designation	Build year	Total produced	AAR wheel arrangement	Prime mover	Power output	Image
57-ton gas–electric boxcab	1913	1	B-B	2× GM-16C4 V-8		
60-ton demonstrator	1924	1	B-B	Ingersoll-Rand	300 hp (220 kW)	
60-ton boxcab	1928	3	B-B	Ingersoll-Rand	300 hp (220 kW)	
100-ton boxcab	1928	12	B-B	2x Ingersoll-Rand	600 hp (450 kW)	
EN-6			B-B			
1800-hp transfer	1936	1	C-C	2x Ingersoll-Rand	1,800 hp (1,340 kW)	
2000-hp transfer	1936	1	C-C	Busch-Sulzer	2,000 hp (1,490 kW)	
UM20B	1954	2 (1 ea cab and booster)	B-B	CB 8 cyl	1,200 hp (890 kW)	
UM20B	1954	2 (1 ea cab and booster)	B-B	CB 12 cyl	1,800 hp (1,340 kW)	
GE GEX3341	1954–1966	11 White Pass and Yukon Route	C-C	ALCO 6-251	930–990 hp (690–740 kW)	

=== Universal Series (1956 to 1998) ===
==== Four axle ====
Model designation	Build year	Total produced	AAR wheel arrangement	Prime mover	Power output	Image
U4B			B-B			
U5B	1963	139	B-B	Caterpillar D-379	540 hp	
U6B	1959	131	B-B			
U8B	1960	134	B-B			
UM6B	1973	20	B-B	Caterpillar D-379	700 hp (520 kW)	
U9B	1957	13	B-B	CB. FWL 6T	1,060 hp (790 kW)	
U9C	1958	16	B-B	Cooper Bessemer FWBL 6T	990 hp	
U10B / DH class	1964–1992	447	B-B	Caterpillar D398	900 hp (670 kW)	
UM10B	1961	86	B-B	Caterpillar D398B	1,050 hp (780 kW)	
U11B	1980		B-B	Caterpillar D388 & D389		
U12B	1958	97	B-B	CB FVBL-8	1,200 hp (890 kW)	South African Class 31-000 31-028
U13B		64	B-B			
UD18	1956	10	B-B	GE FDL-12	1,800 hp (1,340 kW)	
U18B	1973–1976	163	B-B	GE 7FDL-8	1,800 hp (1,340 kW)	
U23B	1968–1977	481	B-B	GE 7FDL-12	2,350 hp (1,750 kW)	
U25B	1959–1966	478	B-B	GE FDL-16	2,500 hp (1,860 kW)	3100 is on display at the Orange Empire Railway Museum.
U28B	1966-1967	148	B-B	GE FDL-16	2,800 hp (2,090 kW)	Chicago, Milwaukee, St. Paul and Pacific Railroad ("Milwaukee Road") GE U28B diesel locomotive #5505.
U30B	1966–1975	295	B-B	GE FDL-16	3000 hp (2240 kW)	Milwaukee Road GE U30B diesel locomotive #5601.
U33B	1966–1975	137	B-B	GE FDL-16	3,300 hp (2,460 kW)	
U36B	1969–1974	125	B-B	GE FDL-16	3,600 hp (2,680 kW)	
MATE	1971–1972	25	B-B	none	Road Slug	

==== Six axle ====
Model designation	Build year	Total produced	AAR wheel arrangement	Prime mover	Power output	Image
U100T	1952-1953	13	C-C	CB FVL-12T	1,100 hp (820 kW)	
U67T	1955-1958	12	A1A-A1A	CB FWL-6T	640 hp (477 kW)	
U12C	1956–1961	153	C-C	CB FVL-8ST	1,420 hp (1,060 kW)	
UM12C	1956, 1963, 1966	20 Philippine National Railways; 50 State Railway of Thailand	C-C	Cummins KT38-L x 2 (State Railway of Thailand) Cooper-Bessemer FVBL-8 (Philippine National Railways)	One prime mover: 660 hp (490 kW) Total: 1,320 hp (980 kW) in case of Cummins KT38-L	
U13C	1967	109	C-C	GE 7FDL-8	1,420 hp (1,060 kW)	
U14C	1979	15 (Philippine National Railways)	C-C	GE 7FDL-8	1,400 hp (1,040 kW)	
U15C	1970–1980	274 (70 SAR 35-000, 6 PNR 900)	C-C	GE 7FDL-8	1,160 kW (1,560 hp)	South African Class 35–400 35-425
U17C	1973–1981	30	C-C	GE 7FDL-8	1,700 hp (1,270 kW)	U17C in service for Syrian Railways in Syria
U18C	1976–1998	420	C-C	GE 7FDL-8	1,950 hp (1,450 kW)	CC 201 01R is the oldest GE U18C locomotive in The World, and still in service until present.
UM18C			C-C			
U20C	1964–2002	984	C-C	GE FDL-12 before 1964 GE 7FDL-8 after 1995	2,150 hp (1,600 kW)	CC 203 22 is one of the Indonesian GE U20C locomotives built in 1996 with semi-streamlined driver cabin.
U22C	1975–1985	49	C-C	GE FDL-12	2,200 hp (1,640 kW)	Queensland Railwayd 2600 class on the GAP Line
U23C	1968–1976	223	C-C	GE FDL-12	2,250 hp (1,680 kW)	
U25C	1963–1965	113	C-C	GE FDL-16	2,500 hp (1,860 kW)	Burlington Northern Railroad GE U25C locomotive #5603
U26C	1971–1987	392	C-C	GE FDL-12	2,750 hp (2,050 kW)	The NZR DX class, a GE U26C
U28C	1965–1966	71	C-C	GE FDL-16	2,800 hp (2,090 kW)	
U30C	1966–1976	606	C-C	GE FDL-16	3,000 hp (2,240 kW)	Burlington Northern Railroad 5383, a GE U30C.
U33C	1968–1975	375	C-C	GE FDL-16	3,300 hp (2,460 kW)	
U36C	1971–1975	238	C-C	GE FDL-16	3,600 hp (2,700 kW)	
U50C	1969–1971	40	C-C	Dual; GE FDL-12	5,000 hp (3,730 kW)	

==== Six axle & Pony ====
Model designation	Build year	Total produced	AAR wheel arrangement	Prime mover	Power output	Image
U18C1	1959–1961	115 (SAR)	1C-C1	CB FVBL-12	2,150 hp (1,600 kW)	South African Class 32-000 32-001
U20C1	1966	10 (SAR)	1C-C1	GE 7FDL-12	2,150 hp (1,600 kW)	South African Class 32–200 32-202

==== Eight axle ====
Model designation	Build year	Total produced	AAR wheel arrangement	Prime mover	Power output	Image
U50	1963–1965	26	B+B-B+B	Dual; GE FDL-16	5,000 hp (3,700 kW)	

=== Dash 7 Series (introduced 1977) ===
Models with "A" suffix are equipped with 12-cylinder prime mover in place of the standard 16-cylinder version, with the same power output.

==== Four axle ====
Model designation	Build year	Total produced	AAR wheel arrangement	Prime mover	Power output	Image
B23-7	1977–1984	536	B-B	GE 7FDL-12	2,250 hp (1,678 kW)	BNSF 4258, a GE B23-7, on February 15, 2005, at Commerce, CA
BQ23-7	1978–1979	10	B-B	GE 7FDL-12	2,250 hp (1,678 kW)	
B30-7	1977–1981	199	B-B	GE 7FDL-16	3,000 hp (2,238 kW)	SSW 7784, a GE B30-7
B30-7A	1981–1983	200	B-B	GE 7FDL-12	3,000 hp (2,238 kW)	Burlington Northern Railroad 4010, a GE B30-7AB
B36-7	1980–1985	230	B-B	GE 7FDL-16	3,600 hp (2,685 kW)	

==== Six axle ====
Model designation	Build year	Total produced	AAR wheel arrangement	Prime mover	Power output	Image
C18-7i	1993	10	C-C	GE 7FDL-8	1,800 hp ( kW)	AFE #2002, a GE C18-7i, Uruguay.
C22-7i	1999	20	C-C			
CM22-7i	1995	38	C-C	Cummins KTA50-L x 2	One prime mover: 1,250 hp (930 kW) Total: 2,500 hp (1,860 kW)	GEA Class (GE CM22-7i) locomotive No. 4541 is parked at Bangkok Railway Station (Hua Lamphong), waiting to operate Ordinary Train No. 207 (Bangkok - Nakhon Sawan), scheduled to depart at 14:10.
C30-7	1976–1985	1,137	C-C	GE 7FDL-16	3,000 hp (2,238 kW)	Conrail #6600, a GE C30-7, refueling at Brownsville, Pennsylvania.
C30-7A	1984–1985	50	C-C	GE 7FDL-12	3,000 hp (2,238 kW)	
C36-7	1978–1985	602	C-C	GE 7FDL-16	3,600 hp (2,685 kW)	CSX 7134, former Conrail, is used for switching duty in the C&O yard at Newport News, Virginia.

=== Dash 8 Series (introduced 1982) ===
GE originally introduced this series with the model designation following the pattern of the Dash-7 line. After product improvements were made to the line in 1987 the official designations for models in this series changed to "Dash-8...", as shown in the list below. However, for simplicity, many railroads decided to use designations which follow the pattern of the Dash-7 line. Thus, for example, the Dash 8-40C is usually rendered as "C40-8". The "W" suffix indicates the then-optional wide-nose "North American" safety cab. For example, the Santa Fe used the designation "B40-8W" for GE's "Dash 8-40BW". The railroad continued this practice until its merger with the Burlington Northern Railroad in 1995, and the new railroad, Burlington Northern-Santa Fe (later BNSF Railway) furthered the practice.

Introduced during the Dash 8's later years were split-cooling in the radiators and electronic displays for the crews (instead of analogue gauges).

==== Four axle ====
Model designation	Build year	Total produced	AAR wheel arrangement	Prime mover	Power output	Image
Dash 8-32B (B32-8)	1984–1989	49	B-B	GE 7FDL-12	3,150 hp (2.3 MW)	GE Dash 8-32B
Dash 8-36B (B36-8)	1982	1	B-B	GE 7FDL-16	3,600 hp (2,685 kW)	
Dash 8-39B (B39-8)	1984–1988	146	B-B	GE 7FDL-16	3,900 hp (2,910 kW)	SP 8033, a Dash 8-39B, leads an EMD SD40T-2 and another GE locomotive westbound through Aurora, Illinois.
Dash 8-40B (B40-8)	1988–1989	151	B-B	GE 7FDL-16	4,000 hp (2.9 MW)	GE Dash 8-40B
Dash 8-40BW (B40-8W)	1988, 1990-1992	84	B-B	GE 7FDL-16	4,000 hp (2.9 MW)	GE Dash 8-40BW locomotive, BNSF Railway #566.

==== Six axle ====
Model designation	Build year	Total produced	AAR wheel arrangement	Prime mover	Power output	Image
Dash 8-30C (C30-8)	1990-1998	14 50 (CM30-8)	C-C	GE 7FDL-12	3,190 hp (2,830 kW)	
Dash 8-32C (C32-8)	1984	10	C-C	GE 7FDL-12	3,200 hp (2,390 kW)	Brazil Railway (Brasil Ferrovias) no9339
Dash 8-36C (C36-8)	1983	1	C-C	GE 7FDL-16	3,600 hp (2,680 kW)	
Dash 8-39C (C39-8)	1984–1987	161	C-C	GE 7FDL-16	3,900 hp (2,910 kW)	CSXT 7484, formerly Conrail 6009
Dash 8-40C (C40-8)	1987–1992	607	C-C	GE 7FDL-16	4,000 hp (2,980 kW)	
Dash 8-40CM (C40-8M)	1990-1994	84	C-C	GE 7FDL-16	4,000 hp (2,980 kW)	
Dash 8-40CW (C40-8W)	1989–1994	1,504	C-C	GE 7FDL-16	4,000 hp (2,980 kW)	Conrail 6114 leads a train westbound out of Altoona, Pennsylvania, in 1993.
Dash 8.5-40CW	2012–2016		C-C	GE 7FDL-16	4,000 hp (2,980 kW)	
Dash 8-41CW (C41-8W)	1993	27	C-C	GE 7FDL-16	4,135 hp (3,080 kW)	
Dash 8-44CW (C44-8W)	1993	53	C-C	GE 7FDL-16	4,400 hp (3,280 kW)	

==== Eight axle ====
Model designation	Build year	Total produced	AAR wheel arrangement	Prime mover	Power output	Image
Dash-8 BB40-8M		6	B-B+B-B	GE 7FDL-16	4,100 hp (3,060 kW)	EFVM BB40-8M #1001 loading an 80 iron ore cars at Caue mine. Itabirá, MG – BR, in 2004.

=== Dash 9 Series (introduced 1993) ===
The Dash 9 series introduced primarily electronics updates to the Dash 8 line. Also introduced was the HiAd (High-Adhesion) truck. Split-cooling was standard.

==== Four axle ====
No four axle freight versions produced

==== Six axle ====
Model designation	Build year	Total produced	AAR wheel arrangement	Prime mover	Power output	Image
Dash 9-40C (C40-9)	1995	125	C-C	GE 7FDL-16	4,000 hp (2.9 MW)	
Dash 9-40CW (C40-9W)	1996–2004	1,090	C-C	GE 7FDL-16	4,000 hp (2.9 MW)	
Dash 9-44CW (C44-9W)	1993–2004	3,682	C-C	GE 7FDL-16	4,400 hp (3.2 MW)	Burlington Northern Santa Fe Railway 5518, a GE C44-9W diesel locomotive.
C38EMi	2006-2007	40	C-C	GE 7FDL-16	3,800 hp (2,830 kW)	MRS 3920-1
C44EMi	2007-2008	45	C-C	GE 7FDL-16	3,800 hp (2,830 kW)	MRS 3920-1
GE Dash Cv9-40i	1996-1998	120	C-C	GE 7FDL-16	4,000 hp (2,980 kW)	Indian Pacific NR 27
C38AChe	2005–2006	78	C-C	GE 7FDL-16	5,100 hp (3,800 kW)	

==== Eight axle ====
Model designation	Build year	Total produced	AAR wheel arrangement	Prime mover	Power output	Image
Dash 9-40BBM (BBM40-9)	1995		B-B+B-B	GE FDL-16	4,000 hp (2,980 kW)	
Dash 9-40BBW (BBW40-9)	1997–2006	141 (for Vitoria a Minas, Brazil)	B-B+B-B	GE 7FDL-16	4,000 hp (2,980 kW)	

=== AC Series (introduced 1994) ===
These feature the same carbody design and many of the internal components as the Dash-9 series, except they are equipped with AC traction motors instead of the conventional DC versions. The cab air conditioner was moved from the left (conductor's) side walkway to a position under the cab floor to make space for the six traction inverters (one per axle) that supply the AC current to the traction motors.

==== Six axle ====
Model designation	Build year	Total produced	AAR wheel arrangement	Prime mover	Power output	Image
AC4400CW (CW44AC)	1993–2004	3,018	C-C	GE 7FDL-16	4,400 hp (3.2 MW)	UP 6670, a GE AC4400CW.
AC44i (See Note 1)	2008–	550	C-C	GE 7FDL-12	4,500 hp (3.3 MW)	
AC6000CW (CW60AC) (See Note 2)	1995-2001	317	C-C	GE 7HDL-16	6,000 hp (4.6 MW)	CSX 627 at Pinner's Point in Portsmouth, Virginia.
C30ACi	2010-2015	203	C-C	GE 7FDL-12	3,000 hp (2.2 MW)	Transnet 43-121, a GE C30ACi
C44ACi	2008–Present	274	C-C	GE 7FDL-16	4,400 hp (3.2 MW)	

Note 1: The "AC44i" is an export version of the AC4400CW locomotive for Brazil. In that country, these models are the first to use AC (Alternating Current) in their operating systems. The first units were made in United States on 2008, and the other sequential units made in the local plant of GE, in Contagem municipality, Minas Gerais.

Note 2: two versions: one contained a 16-cylinder 7HDL, co-developed by GE and the German firm Deutz-MWM, rated at 6000 HP; the other a 16-cylinder 7FDL rated at 4390 HP. The units equipped with the 7FDL were a sub-version AC6000 "Convertible" and were produced to get the type into operation while the 7HDL was developed.

=== Evolution Series (introduced 2005) ===
The Evolution Series locomotives replaced the Dash 9 and AC series in North America and exceeded the then new U.S. EPA Tier II emissions standards that took effect in 2005, reducing nitrogen oxides emissions by over 40% and improving fuel consumption as well. They use the new GEVO engine (based in part on the 7HDL design) which produces the same power from twelve cylinders as previous locomotives' 16-cylinder 7FDL engine. Both AC and DC Evolution Series share the same carbody design. The radiator section "wings" are divided into two parts with differing angles.

==== Six axle ====
Model designation	Build year	Total produced	AAR wheel arrangement	Prime mover	Power output	Image
ES40ACi	2015–	233	C-C	GEVO-12	4,200 hp (3.0 MW)	
ES40DC	2004–2008	302	C-C	GEVO-12	4,000 hp (2.9 MW)	Norfolk Southern #7670, GE ES40-DC
ES44DC	2005–2010	1,066	C-C	GEVO-12	4,400 hp (3.2 MW)	Burlington Northern Santa Fe 7759 GE ES44DC
ES44DCi		100	C-C	GEVO-12	4,400 hp (3.2 MW)	Rio Tinto ES44DCi No. 8181
ES44AC	2003–	4,096	C-C	GEVO-12	4,400 hp (3.2 MW)	Canadian Pacific Railway 8822, GE ES44AC
ES44ACi	2009–	Over 387 (8 For passengers)	C-C	GEVO-12	4,400 hp (3.2 MW)	KTZ TE33A portrait
ES44C4	2009–2020	1,323	A1A-A1A	GEVO-12	4,400 hp (3.2 MW)	BNSF #6774, GE ES44C4
ET44AC	2015–	884	C-C	GEVO-12	4,400 hp (3.2 MW)	Union Pacific ET44AC (C45AH) No. 2668
ET44C4	2015–2020	311	A1A-A1A	GEVO-12	4,400 hp (3.2 MW)	GE #2025, GE ET44C4
ES58ACi	2009–	125	C-C	GEVO-16	6,200 hp (4.3 MW)	
C44ESACi	2024-2025	50	C-C	GEVO-12	4,536 hp (3.3 MW)	
ES59ACi	2008–2010	700 (300 dual cab)	C-C	GEVO-16	6,250 hp (4.4 MW)	

==== Eight axle ====
Model designation	Build year	Total produced	AAR wheel arrangement	Prime mover	Power output	Image
*ES43BBi	2015–	7 (Klabin); 43 (Rumo Logística) + 11 to VLi "VL!" Multimodal S.A.	B-B+B-B	GEVO-12	4,400 hp (3.2 MW)	

*Note: GE Brazil has an order for 46 units of this model for Rumo Logística, which will be delivered during the year 2017. Is the most powerful narrow gauge 1,000 mm (3 ft 3 3/8 in) locomotive in the world.

=== FLXDrive ===
The FLXDrive Series of locomotives are GE's first battery-electric locomotives, using a similar design to the Evolution Series, with the exception of a diesel prime mover. The FLXDrive series was introduced in late 2019 with one BEL44C4D demonstrator unit, but other FLXDrive variants are planned for the future.

==== Six axle ====
Model designation	Build year	Total produced	AAR wheel arrangement	Prime mover	Power output	Image
BEL44C4D	2019–	1	A1A-A1A	Lithium-ion batteries	4,400 hp (3.2 MW)	

=== PowerHaul Series ===
==== Six axle ====
Model designation	Build year	Total produced	AAR wheel arrangement	Prime mover	Power output	Image
PH37ACmi	2009–2017	37	C-C	GE PowerHaul P616	3,690 hp (2.7 MW)	
PH37ACi	2013–2019	50	C-C	GE PowerHaul P616	3,690 hp (2.7 MW)	
PH37ACmai	2014	3	C-C	GE PowerHaul P616	3,690 hp (2.7 MW)	

== Passenger locomotives ==
While primarily a builder of freight locomotives, GE has on occasion been called upon to construct passenger models for specific customers. The most recent is the P42DC, ordered by Amtrak to replace the aging EMD F40PH. Additional units have been built for Via Rail Canada.

Model designation	Build year	Total produced	AAR wheel arrangement	Prime mover	Power output	Image
U28CG	1966	10	C-C	GE FDL-16	2,800 hp (2.0 MW)	Santa Fe No. 7908, a GE U28CG, in freight service at Fort Madison, Iowa in 1971
U30CG	1967	6	C-C	GE FDL-16	3,000 hp (2,240 kW)	U30CG 404 pulling the Tulsan in 1969.
U34CH	1970-1973	33	C-C	GE FDL-16	3,600 hp (2.7 MW)	U34CH 4172 on the "Farewell to the U34CH" excursion at Hillsdale, New Jersey, August 27, 1994
U36CG	1974	20	C-C	GE FDL-16	3,600 hp (2,680 kW)	
P30CH	1975-1976	25	C-C	GE FDL-16	3,000 hp (2,240 kW)	Amtrak #712 in Southern Pacific service on the Peninsula Commute in 1978.
Dash 8-32BWH (B32-8WH)	1991	20	B-B	GE 7FDL-12	3,200 hp (2,390 kW)	Amtrak California Dash 8-32BWH at Oakland Jack London Square station
P40DC	1993	44	B-B	GE 7FDL-16	Before Rebuild:4,000 hp (2,980 kW)After Rebuild: 4,250 HP	
P32AC-DM	1995-2001	50	B-B	GE 7FDL-12	3,200 hp (2,390 kW)	
P42DC	1996-2001	228	B-B	GE 7FDL-16	4,250 hp (3.2 MW)	

== Electric locomotives ==
Model designation	Build year	Total produced	AAR wheel arrangement	Supply Voltage	Power output	Image
B&O LE-1	1895-1896	3	B-B		1,448 hp (1,080 kW)	
NYC T-1 later reclassed as S-1	1904	1 New York Central Railroad	1-D-1 rebuilt to 2-D-2	600 V DC	1,695 hp (1,264 kW)	
NYC T-2 later reclassed as S-2	1906	34 New York Central Railroad	1-D-1 rebuilt to 2-D-2	600 V DC	1,695 hp (1,264 kW)	
NYC S-3	1908–1909	12 New York Central Railroad	2-D-2	600 V DC	1,695 hp (1,264 kW)	
GN boxcab	1909	4 Great Northern Railway	B+B	6,000 V, 3 phase AC	1,000 hp (750 kW)	
NH 068	1912	1 New York, New Haven and Hartford Railroad	2-B+B-2	11,000 V AC, 25 Hz	1,560 hp (1,160 kW)	
NYC T-1b	1913	10 New York Central Railroad	B+B-B+B	600 V DC	2,500 hp (1,900 kW)	
NYC T-2a	1914	16 New York Central Railroad	B+B-B+B	600 V DC	2,500 hp (1,900 kW)	
Canadian National Class Z-1-a	1914–1916	6 Canadian Northern Railway (later Canadian National Railway)	B+B	2400 V DC	1,100 hp (820 kW)	
MILW EF-1 / EP-1 (GE's self-proclaimed "King of the Rails")	1915–1917	42 Milwaukee Road	2-B+B+B+B-2	3000 V DC	3,340 hp (2,490 kW)	
MILW ES-1	1915	1 Milwaukee Road	B-B	1500 V DC	316 hp (236 kW)	
MILW ES-2	1916, 1919	4 Milwaukee Road	B-B	3000 V DC	475 hp (354 kW)	
MILW EP-2 (“Bi-polar”)	1919	5 Milwaukee Road	1B+D+D+B1	3000 V DC	3,180 hp (2,370 kW)	
NRT S104/105	1920	2 Northwestern Elevated Railroad	B-B	600 V DC	165 horsepower (123 kW)	
NdeM Boxcabs (No. 1001-1012)	1923	12 Mexican Railway	B+B+B	3000 V DC	2,520 hp (1,880 kW)	
JNR ED11	1923	2 Japanese National Railways	B-B	1500 V DC	975 hp (727 kW)	
JNR ED14	1926	4 Japanese National Railways	B-B	1500 V DC	975 hp (727 kW)	
New York Central R-Motor	1926	2 New York Central Railroad	B-B+B-B	600 V DC	3,320 hp (2,480 kW)	
NYC Q	1926	New York Central Railroad	B-B	600 V DC	1,665 hp (1,242 kW)	
NYC T-3	1926	10 New York Central Railroad	B+B-B+B	600 V DC	2,500 hp (1,900 kW)	
NH EF2	1926	5 New York, New Haven and Hartford Railroad	1-B+B-1		1,350 hp (1,010 kW)	
NH EY3	1926	2 New York, New Haven and Hartford Railroad	B+B	11,000 V AC, 25 Hz	500 hp (370 kW)	
GN Y-1 (PRR FF2)	1927–1930	8 Great Northern Railway (sold to Pennsylvania Railroad)	1-C+C-1	11,000 V AC, 25 Hz	3,000 hp (2,200 kW)	
CUT P1-a	1929–1930	22 Cleveland Union Terminal to New York Central Railroad and rebuilt to class P-2	2-C+C-2	3000 V DC rebuilt 600 V DC	3,030 hp (2,260 kW)	
GE three-power boxcab	1930	40 New York Central Railroad; 1 Chicago, Rock Island and Pacific Railroad	B-B	All: 600 V DC Battery; 34: 600 V DC 3rd Rail; 2: 3000 V DC Overhead Lines	1,580 hp (1,180 kW)	
NYC R-2	1930–1931	42 New York Central Railroad	C-C	600 V DC	2,500 hp (1,900 kW)	
NH EP3	1931	10 New York, New Haven and Hartford Railroad	2-C+C-2	11,000 V AC, 25 Hz / 600 V DC	3,440 hp (2,570 kW)	
S	1931-1932	8 People's Commissariat of Communication Routes of the Soviet Union	C-C	3000 V DC	2,800 hp (2,100 kW)	
PRR P5a	1932	25 Pennsylvania Railroad (+13 by PRR, +54 by Westinghouse)	2-C-2	11,000 V AC, 25 Hz	3,750 hp (2,800 kW)	
PRR GG1	1934–1935 (PRR: 1935–1943)	15 Pennsylvania Railroad (+124 by PRR)	2-C+C-2	11,000 V AC, 25 Hz	4,620 hp (3,450 kW)	PRR GG-1 at the NRM, Green Bay.
NH EP4	1938	6 New York, New Haven and Hartford Railroad	2-C+C-2	11,000 V AC, 25 Hz / 600 V DC	3,600 hp (2,700 kW)	
NH EF3a	1942	5 New York, New Haven and Hartford Railroad	2-C+C-2	11,000 V AC, 25 Hz	4,860 hp (3,620 kW)	
2-C+C-2	1940–1948	22 Paulista Railway; 15 Estrada de Ferro Central do Brasil	2-C+C-2	3000 V DC	3,800 hp (2,800 kW)	
2-D+D-2 ("Little Joe")	1946	20 Soviet Railways (not delivered – 5 Paulista Railway; 3 South Shore Line; 12 Milwaukee Road)	2-D+D-2	3,300 V DC; As rebuilt by CSS&SB: 1,500 V DC	5,500 hp (4,100 kW)	
GN W-1	1947	2 Great Northern Railway	B-D+D-B	11,000 V AC, 25 Hz	5,000 hp (3,700 kW)	
VGN EL-2B	1948	4 sets (2 units each) Virginian Railway	(B+B-B+B)+(B+B-B+B)	11,000 V AC, 25 Hz	6,800 hp (5,100 kW) per set	
CN Z-5-a	1950	3 Canadian National Railway	B-B	2400 V DC	1,100 hp (820 kW)	
PRR E2b	1951	6 Pennsylvania Railroad	B-B	11,000 V AC, 25 Hz	2,500 horsepower (1,900 kW)	
NH EP5 (PC E40)	1954	10 New York, New Haven and Hartford Railroad	C-C	11,000 V AC, 25 Hz / 600 V DC	4,000 hp (3,000 kW)	
VGN EL-C (PC E33)	1956–1957	12 Virginian Railway	C-C	11,000 V AC, 25 Hz	3,300 hp (2,500 kW)	
PRR E44	1960–1963	44 Pennsylvania Railroad	C-C	11,000 V AC, 25 Hz	4,400 hp (3,300 kW)	
PRR E44a	1960–1963	22 Pennsylvania Railroad	C-C	11,000 V AC, 25 Hz	5,000 hp (3,700 kW)	
E50C	1968	2 Muskingum Electric Railroad	C-C	25,000 V AC, 60 Hz	5,000 hp (3,700 kW)	
E60C	1972–1976	6 Black Mesa and Lake Powell Railroad	C-C	50,000 V AC, 60 Hz (overhead)	6,000 hp (4,500 kW)	
E60CH / E60CP	1974–1976	26 Amtrak, (5 Steam generator), (20 Head End Power/ HEP)	C-C	11,000 V AC, 25 Hz; 11,000–13,500 V AC 60 Hz (overhead)	6,000 hp (4,500 kW)	E60MA 604 in Philadelphia
E25B	1976	7 Texas Utilities	B-B	25,000 V AC, 60 Hz	2,500 hp (1,900 kW)	
E42C	1977–1981, 1992	97 Taiwan Railway Administration	C-C	25,000 V AC, 60 Hz (overhead)	3,800 hp (2,800 kW)	
E60C-2	1982–1983	39 Ferrocarriles Nacionales de México; 2 Deseret Western Railway	C-C	25 kV AC, 60 Hz (NdM); 50 kV AC, 60 Hz (DW) (overhead)	6,000 hp (4,500 kW)	

== Turbine locomotives ==
Model designation	Build year	Total produced	AAR wheel arrangement	Prime mover	Power output	Image
GE steam turbine locomotives	1938	2	2-C+C-2	Steam turbine	2,500 hp (1.86 MW)	
4500 HP GTEL	1948–1954	26	B+B-B+B	Gas turbine	4,500 hp (3.4 MW)	
8500 HP GTEL	1958–1961	30	C-C+C-C	Gas turbine	8,500 hp (6.3 MW)	

== Indonesian locomotives ==
Locomotives exported to Indonesia are quite different from other locomotives produced by GE. They use the same type of engine across all models (GE 7FDL-8, except for UM 106T Locomotives which used Alco 12-244E). Despite using the same type of engine, the power capabilities from type to type are different as some models are equipped with dual turbocharger, or equipped with common rail system and dual turbocharger.

Model designation	Build year	Known as	Total produced	AAR wheel arrangement	Prime mover	Power output	Image
UM 106T; Shovelnose series	1953	CC200	27	C-2-C	Alco 12-244E	1,750 hp (1,300 kW)	
U18A1A	1978–1983	BB203	59, 52 was rebuilt into U18C (CC201)	A1A-A1A	GE 7FDL-8	1,500 hp (1,100 kW)	
U18C	1977–1992	CC201	92, 7 was rebuilt into C18MMi (CC204)	C-C	GE 7FDL-8	1,950 hp (1,450 kW)	
U20C Widecab	1995–2002	CC203	42	C-C	GE 7FDL-8 (Dual turbocharger)	2,150 hp (1,600 kW)	
C18MMi	2003–2005	CC204; 1st generation	7 (all rebuilt from U18C (CC201))	C-C	GE 7FDL-8	1,950 hp (1,450 kW)	
C20EMP	2006–2011	CC204; 2nd generation	30	C-C	GE 7FDL-8 (Dual turbocharger and common rail)	2,150 hp (1,600 kW)	
CM20EMP	2013–2016	CC206	150	C-C	GE 7FDL-8 (Dual turbocharger and common rail)	2,250 hp (1,680 kW)	

Notes
- These locomotive models are cited from Indonesian Railways 2004 Diesel Locomotive Rosters by Indra Krishnamurti.
- These locomotives are for Indonesian Railways Co. export only.
- Although the C20EMPs were introduced in 2006, those locomotives have been operated since 2008. These locomotives were assembled in PT Industri Kereta Api, Madiun.
- Actually the C18MMis were retrofitted from U18Cs to C20EMP minimum specifications in Yogyakarta Locomotive Workshop (see above).

== See also ==
List of preserved GE locomotives
