= Paul Chapman =

Paul Chapman may refer to:

== People ==
- Paul Wadsworth Chapman (1880–1954), American banker and businessman
- Paul Chapman (actor) (born 1939), British actor
- Paul Chapman (footballer, born 1951), Welsh football player for Plymouth Argyle
- Paul Chapman (musician) (1954–2020), Welsh rock guitarist
- Paul Chapman (Australian footballer) (born 1981), Australian rules footballer

== Other ==
- Paul Chapman Publishing
