= Hoboken Shore Railroad =

Railroad in New Jersey, United States

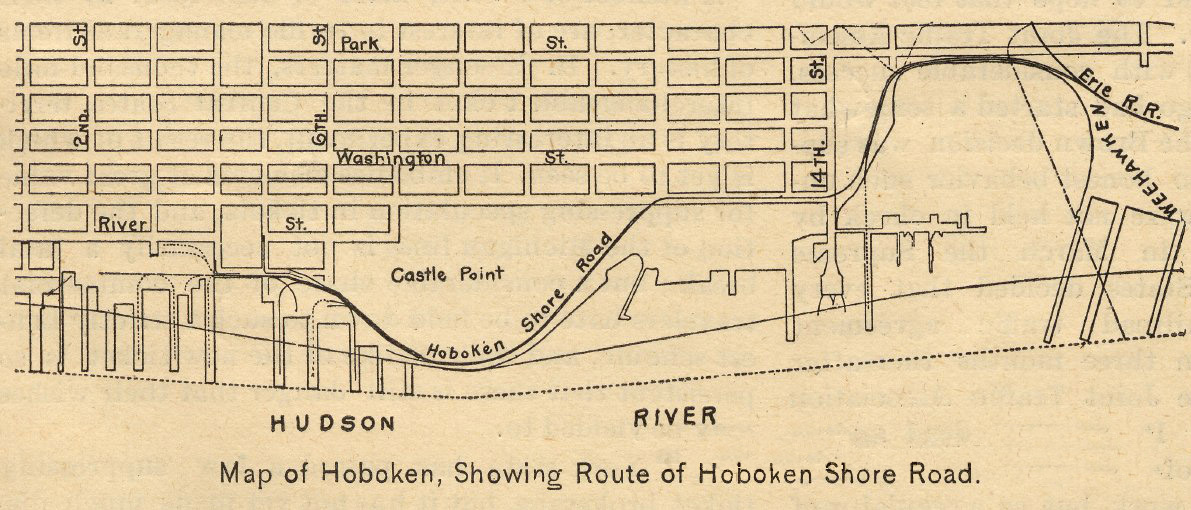
- Route map of the predecessor Hoboken Shore Road

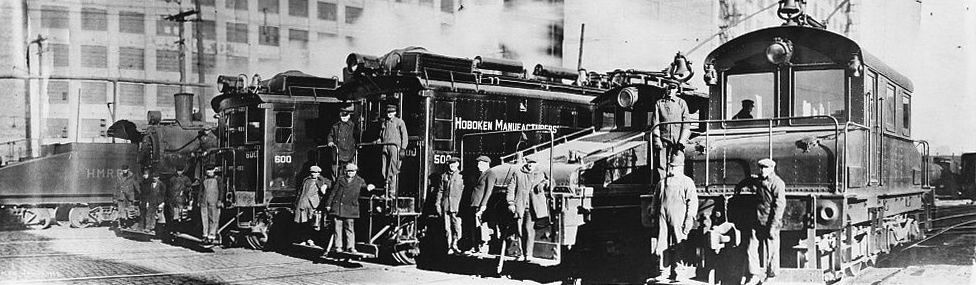
- Locomotives of the predecessor HMRR around 1930

Overview
- Headquarters: 1419 Bloomfield St, Hoboken
- Reporting mark: HBS
- Locale: Hoboken
- Dates of operation: 1954–1978 (predecessor since 1897)

Technical
- Track gauge: 4 ft 8 1/2 in (1,435 mm) standard gauge
- Electrification: predecessor 650 V DC till about 1930
- Length: 1.411 miles (2.271 km)

Hoboken Shore Railroad (reporting mark HBS), initials HSRR, was a New Jersey railroad which was created around 1954. It took over the activities of the Hoboken Manufacturers Railroad (reporting mark HMR), initials HMRR. This railroad owned only 0.221 miles (0.356 km) of mainline but around 1906 leased the longer route of the Hoboken Shore Road which had been operated since 1897 by the Hoboken Railroad Warehouse and Steamship Connecting Company, initials HRRWH&SSConCo or HRRW&SSCCO.

The 1.4 miles (2.3 km) long route of the HBS ran along the Hoboken waterfront, serving as a switching and terminal railroad for all connecting carriers between the Erie yard in Weehawken and the Hoboken Piers and a car float transfer bridge. It used electric operation till the 1930s and was abandoned in 1978, after the demise of the Hoboken Piers and the general decline of rail traffic.

== History ==
=== Hoboken Shore Road ===
In 1784 John Stevens purchased the land of today's city of Hoboken from the State of New Jersey. After his death in 1838, his heritage was managed by the Hoboken Land and Improvement Company (HLIC), which held the subsidiary Hoboken Railroad Warehouse and Steamship Connecting Company (HRRWH&SSConCo) founded at September 17, 1895. The railroad began operation as Hoboken Shore Road on September 20, 1897.

=== Hoboken Manufacturers Railroad ===
In 1902 the Hoboken Manufacturers Railroad (HMR) was incorporated. Its task was to extend the Hoboken Shore Road further South to connect with the DL&W in Jersey City, which never happened. Incorporated in 1905, the American Warehouse & Trading Company took control of the HMR. The less than a quarter mile long mainline of the HMR ran from the end of the Hoboken Shore Road to 1st Street and was opened about 1906. In the same year the HMR leased the railroad operation from the HRRWH&SSConCo for 99 years.

When the United States joined the Allies in World War I in 1917, the government seized all the piers and properties of German transatlantic shipping companies, namely the Hamburg America Line and the North German Lloyd. Furthermore, the Government bought all the shares of the American Warehouse & Trading Company for 2.45 Million dollars on July 1, 1917 and therefore gained control over the HMR. After the war, in 1924, discussions were held about selling the railroad to the Port Authority of New York and New Jersey, but it didn't have sufficient funds for the purchase. Therefore, it got sold in September 1927 to the Hoboken Railroad & Terminal Company owned by the Paul Chapman Company, which sold it in 1932 to Seatrain Lines.

=== Hoboken Shore Railroad ===
After the death of Paul Chapman in 1954, the Hoboken Shore Railroad was created. Its 4000 shares were all owned by the HRRWH&SSConCo, which was owned by Webb and Knapp, but was up for sale. Traffic declined when industry and shipping in Hoboken closed or moved to other places. The railroad operated till 1977 and was officially abandoned in 1978.

== Road Description ==
The Hoboken Shore Road was built by Hoboken Railroad Warehouse and Steamship Connecting Company and operated a 1.411 mile long main line, which started from the Erie yard in Weehawken and ran along the shore. The northern end point was at 18th Street & Park Avenue, and the southern end point was at 5th Street & River Street. From the main line, sidings branched off to serve local industry. At 11th Street, a car float transfer bridge was operated, which connected the railroad to the Delaware, Lackawanna and Western Railroad (DL&W). The total network had a length of 7.068 miles.

The Hoboken Manufacturers Railroad operated only 0.221 mile of main line and was therefore called the shortest railroad in the US. It connected at 5th Street & River Street to the Hoboken Shore Road and continued South to 1st Street. In addition, it owned about 1.375 miles of yard tracks.

== Operation ==
Shortly after opening to traffic on January 6, 1898, the railroad electrified. The contact wire was installed at a height of 22 feet (6.7 m) in order to allow the brakemen to circulate on the roofs of the freight cars during switching.

By 1911 the railroad had four electric locomotives in operation, and switched between 100 and 150 cars daily. Electric operation was ceased in the 1930s when the GE boxcab diesel locomotives arrived. 1938 brought an Alco HH660 series locomotive and 1947 two GE 44 ton switchers.

After World War II traffic declined. By 1954 the railroad had 38 employees and owned 2 shunting locomotives.

== Roster ==
=== Hoboken Shore Road ===
==== Electric Locomotives ====
Road Number	Delivery	Manufacturer	Weight tons	Power hp	Drawbar pull	Description	Bild
1	1898	GE McGuire	28.5	540	10,000 lbf (44 kN) at 8 mph (13 km/h)	electric steeplecab locomotive with McGuire trucks	
2	1900	GE				4-wheeled electric locomotive already phased out in 1911	
3	1906	Westinghouse	64	400	15,000 lbf (67 kN) at 6 mph (9.7 km/h)	Baldwin trucks	
4	1911	GE	80			Alco trucks	

==== Snow Sweeper ====
Road Number	Delivery	Manufacturer	Description	Bild
	ca. 1898	McGuire	Snow sweeper	Similar vehicle of the Joliet Railway Company

=== Hoboken Manufacturers Railroad ===
Road Number	Delivery	Manufacturer	Weight (tons)	Power	Drawbar pull	Builders #	Description	Bild
500	1928	GE	70	300		10704	first GE boxcab diesel locomotive 300 hp model	
600	1928	GE	108	600		10705	first GE boxcab diesel locomotive 600 hp model	
601	1938	Alco		660		69086	Model HH660	
700	1947	GE	44	380	26,400 lbf		two Caterpillar engines Preserved; owned by the Tri-State Railway Historical Society	
701	1947	GE	44	380	26,400 lbf		two Caterpillar engines	

=== Hoboken Shore Railroad ===
Hoboken Shore Railroad continued to use the 44-ton switchers and also purchased an observation car.

Road Number	Delivered	Manufacturer	Description	Bild
	early 1970s		Observation car, former Erie Railroad private car #4, name Hidden Lake; ended up as CACV #4 Otsego Lake place in Wortendyke	

== See also ==
- Timeline of Jersey City area railroads
