= GE Universal Series =

Series of diesel locomotives

The GE Universal Series is a series of diesel locomotives intended for the export market introduced by General Electric in early 1956. General Electric had previously partnered with Alco, producing locomotives for export using Alco's 244 engine, and provided electrical parts for Alco's domestic production. However, with the advent of the Universal Series, GE ended its partnership with Alco and entered the export locomotive market on its own.

The export-oriented Universal Series should not be confused with the "U-Boats" for the North American market, which began with the U25B. Universal Series locomotives can be identified by the lack of battery boxes usually found under North American locomotives' cabins

== Naming convention ==
The designations of the Universal series describe the locomotive model in compact form: U for Universal, followed by the engine's nominal horsepower rating in hundreds, and finally the number of axles; B = B-B (4 axles); C = C-C (6 axles). An 'M' indicated a modified version of the base model. Along with their development, the same numbers were often reused by different locomotive models. Even the same designation could be shared with domestic locomotives. For example, both the U18C and U20C model numbers refer to different locomotives offered at different dates with different engines (8- and 12-cylinder); and the export U30C model shared the same model number with the US U30C, but had a 12-cylinder, rather than a 16-cylinder engine.

== Engines ==
The initial models of the Universal Series used Caterpillar 375 (8-cylinder), Caterpillar 397 (12-cylinder), Cooper-Bessemer FWB-6L (6-cylinder), Cooper-Bessemer FVBL-8 and FVBL-12 (8- and 12-cylinder, respectively). Later models substituted higher-power Caterpillar engines for the smaller locomotives or GE's own 7FDL8 and 7FDL12 engines for the larger ones. Unlike EMD, GE never had a 16-cylinder engined export locomotive model in the Universal series.

Engine	Number of locomotives built using engine
Cooper-Bessemer FWB-6L	40
CB FBVL-8	335
CB FBVL-12	193
Caterpillar D379	342
Cat D398	736
General Electric 7FDL8	885
GE 7FDL12	1510
Others	79

== Specifications ==
Based on the March 1989 GE Locomotives catalog, the following models were offered at the following specifications.

Model	Engine	Horsepower (traction)	Wheel arrangement	Length (over end frames)	Height (over cabins)	Nominal weight (fully loaded)	Tractive effort (at 30% adhesion)
U10B	Caterpillar 3512	800 hp	B-B	33 ft 6 in (10.21 m)	12 ft 0 in (3.66 m)	110,000 lb (50,000 kg)	33,000 lb (15,000 kg)
U18C	7FDL8	1800 hp	C-C	52 ft (16 m)	12 ft 0.5 in (3.670 m)	193,300 lb (87,700 kg)	57,990 lb (26,300 kg)
U20C	7FDL12	2000 hp	C-C	52 ft (16 m)	12 ft 0.5 in (3.670 m)	196,000 lb (89,000 kg)	58,800 lb (26,700 kg)
U22C UM22C	7FDL12	2150 hp	C-C	52 ft (16 m)	12 ft 0.5 in (3.670 m)	196,000 lb (89,000 kg)	58,800 lb (26,700 kg) 62,700 lb (28,400 kg) (UM22C)
U26C	7FDL12	2600 hp	C-C	55 ft 6 in (16.92 m)	12 ft 1.5 in (3.696 m)	210,000 lb (95,000 kg)	63,000 lb (29,000 kg)
U30C	7FDL12	3000 hp	C-C	55 ft 6 in (16.92 m)	12 ft 1.5 in (3.696 m)	210,000 lb (95,000 kg)	63,000 lb (29,000 kg)

== Models ==
Four models were produced before a worldwide launch. Not all features carried over to the 1956 models:

Model	Year	Engine	Horsepower (traction)	Wheel arrangement	Type	Photo
U100T	1952	CB FVL-12T	1100	C-C	Road switcher	
UM12B (rebuilt as UM20B)	1954	CB FVBL-8 (rebuilt: GE FDL-12)	1200	B-B	Cab unit & booster	
UM18B (rebuilt as UM20B)	1954	CB FVBL-12 (rebuilt: GE FDL-12)	1600	B-B	Cab unit & booster	
U67T	1955	CB FWL-6T	640	A1A-A1A	Road switcher	

Upon introduction in 1956, nine locomotive models were offered, as follows:

Model	Engine	Horsepower (traction)	Wheel arrangement	Type	Photo
U4B	CAT 375	340	B-B	End-cab switcher	Not built
U6B	CAT 397	640	B-B	End-cab switcher	
U8B	CAT D398	900&1000	B-B	Road switcher	
U9B Data Sheet	CB FWB-6L	900	B-B	Road switcher	
U9C Data Sheet	CB FWB-6L	900	C-C	Road switcher	
U12B	CB FVBL-8	1200	B-B	Road switcher	
U12C	CB FVBL-8	1200	C-C	Road switcher	
U18B	CB FVBL-12	1800	B-B	Road switcher	Not built
U18C	CB FVBL-12	1800	C-C	Road switcher	
UD18B	CB FVBL-12	1800	B-B	Road switcher	

The evolution of Universal Series locomotives is complex due to the frequent model name changes and the reusing of the same model names for different locomotives. One method to understand the growth and development of the Universal Series is to divide the nine original models into three groups: 1) small locomotives, 2) intermediate powered locomotives, and 3) high powered locomotives.

=== Small Locomotives ===
Initial model	First update	Second update	Third update
U4B Data Sheet	U5B (1961) (540 hp) Data Sheet	U6B* (1965) (640 hp)	U10B* (1974) (950 hp)
U6B Data Sheet	U8B (1961) (810 hp) Data Sheet	UM10B (1962), later renamed U10B (1964) (950 hp)	U11B (1974) (1000 hp) Data Sheet

In this table, and the following two tables, asterisks indicate repeated model numbers

Between the initial models and the first update, the Caterpillar 375 and 397 engines were replaced with 379 and 398, respectively.

The UM6B was a narrow-gauge variant of the U6B, built for South African Railways.

The 6-cylinder U9B and U9C models were an evolutionary dead end, and no uprated versions were produced.

=== Intermediate Powered Locomotives (8-cylinder) ===
Initial model	First update	Second update	Third update	Fourth update	Fifth update	Sixth update
U12B	U13B (1960) (1300 hp)	U13B* (1963) (1300 hp)	U15B (1969) (1500 hp)	U17B (1973) (1700 hp)		
U12C	U13C (1960) (1300 hp)	U13C* (1963) (1300 hp)	U15C (1991) (1500 hp)	U14CP, U17C (1974) (1400 hp, 1700 hp)	U18C* (1977) (1950 hp)	U20C* (1995) (2150 hp)

Between the first and second updates, the Cooper-Bessemer engine was replaced with 7FDL8 engine. The body style was also changed with a low short hood and Hi-Ad trucks replacing the high short hood and outside-equalized trucks.

A variation of the U18C was the U18A1A, built for the Indonesian railway. These locomotives had the same C-C trucks but one fewer traction motor in each truck, and downrated to 1650 horsepower. Most of these locomotives have been rebuilt to U18C standards.

=== High Powered Locomotives (12-cylinder) ===
Initial model	First update	Second update	Third update	Fourth update	Fifth update
U18C	U20C (1964) (2000 hp)	U20C* (1971) (2000 hp)	U26C (1971) (2600 hp)	U22C (1975) (2150 hp) Data Sheet UM22C (double-ended cab forward) Data Sheet	U30C (1982) (3000 hp)

As with the intermediate powered locomotives, the Cooper-Bessemer engine was also replaced with 7FDL12 engine.

The differently-rated U22C, U26C and U30C models were offered at the same time.

The U18C and the earlier U20C model had a variant with an additional non-powered leading axle in each truck, resulting in a lower axle loading and a 1C-C1 wheel arrangement. These locomotives were only purchased by the South African Railways.

No U18B was produced, and the few UD18 locomotives built were exported to Mexico.

== Universal Series statistics ==
4,091 Universal Series locomotives were built between 1952 and 2001, consisting of the following models:

Model	Number constructed by model
U20C and U20C1	1,000
U10B	510
U18C, U18C1 and U18A1A	420
U26C	392
U15C and U15A1A	322
U6B and UM6B	156
U5B	139
SG10 and SG15	126
U12C	123
U8B	122
U13C	109
U12B	97
U22C and UM22C	93
UM10B and UM10A1A	91
UM12C	80
U13B	74
U11B	62
U17C	58
U30C	52
Other models	94

South Africa has the largest number of Universal Series locomotives, with 1040 locomotives (including SG10 and SG15 models), followed by Brazil with 864 locomotives. Other countries owning more than 100 locomotives are Argentina (182), Colombia (167), Indonesia (192), Mozambique (120) and The Philippines (126).

The majority of the locomotives were built in the General Electric plant in Erie, Pennsylvania, however, licensees such as Dorbyl (South Africa), GE do Brasil (Brazil) and Babcock y Wilcox (Spain) constructed significant numbers of locomotives. Other licensees building smaller numbers of locomotives included Walkers (12), Krupp (49), GE Lokindo (16), GE Montreal (16), Goninan (16) and Nippon Sharyo (1).

Builder	Number constructed by builder
General Electric	2,462
Dorbyl (South Africa)	709
GE do Brasil	544
Babcock y Wilcox (Spain)	259
Others	116

Production peaked in the 1970s, with almost 2,000 locomotives built during this time.

Decade	Number constructed per decade
1952-1960	556
1961-1970	1,125
1971-1980	1,926
1981-1990	369
1991-2001	144

The majority operated on meter gauge and 3 ft 6 in gauge railways.

Gauge	Number constructed by track gauge
2 ft (610 mm) and 3 ft (914 mm)	243
1,000 mm (3 ft 3 3/8 in) and 1,050 mm (3 ft 5 11/32 in)	1,056
3 ft 6 in (1,067 mm)	2,126
4 ft 8 1/2 in (1,435 mm)	300
5 ft 3 in (1,600 mm)	191
1,668 mm (5 ft 5 21/32 in) and 5 ft 6 in (1,676 mm)	204

== Gallery ==
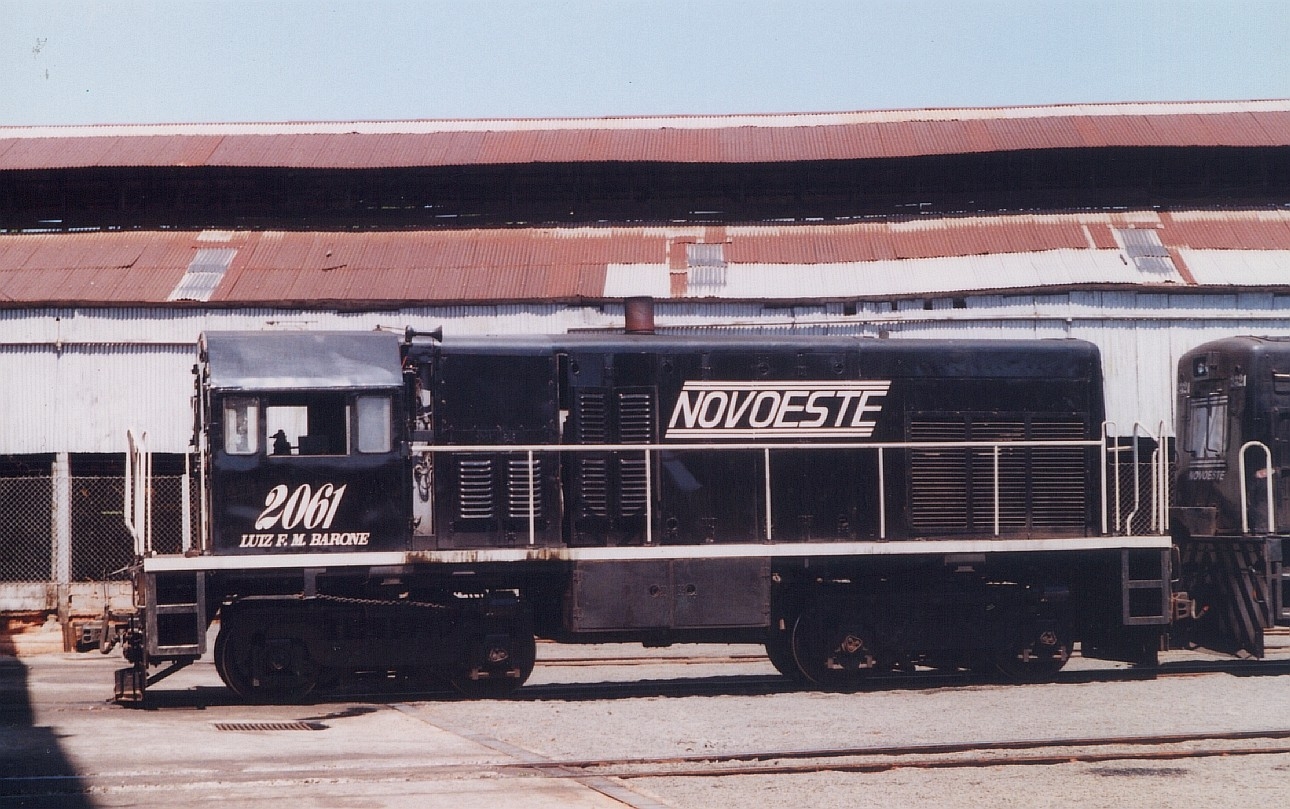
GE U5B NOVOESTE #2061 - "Luiz F. M. Barone"

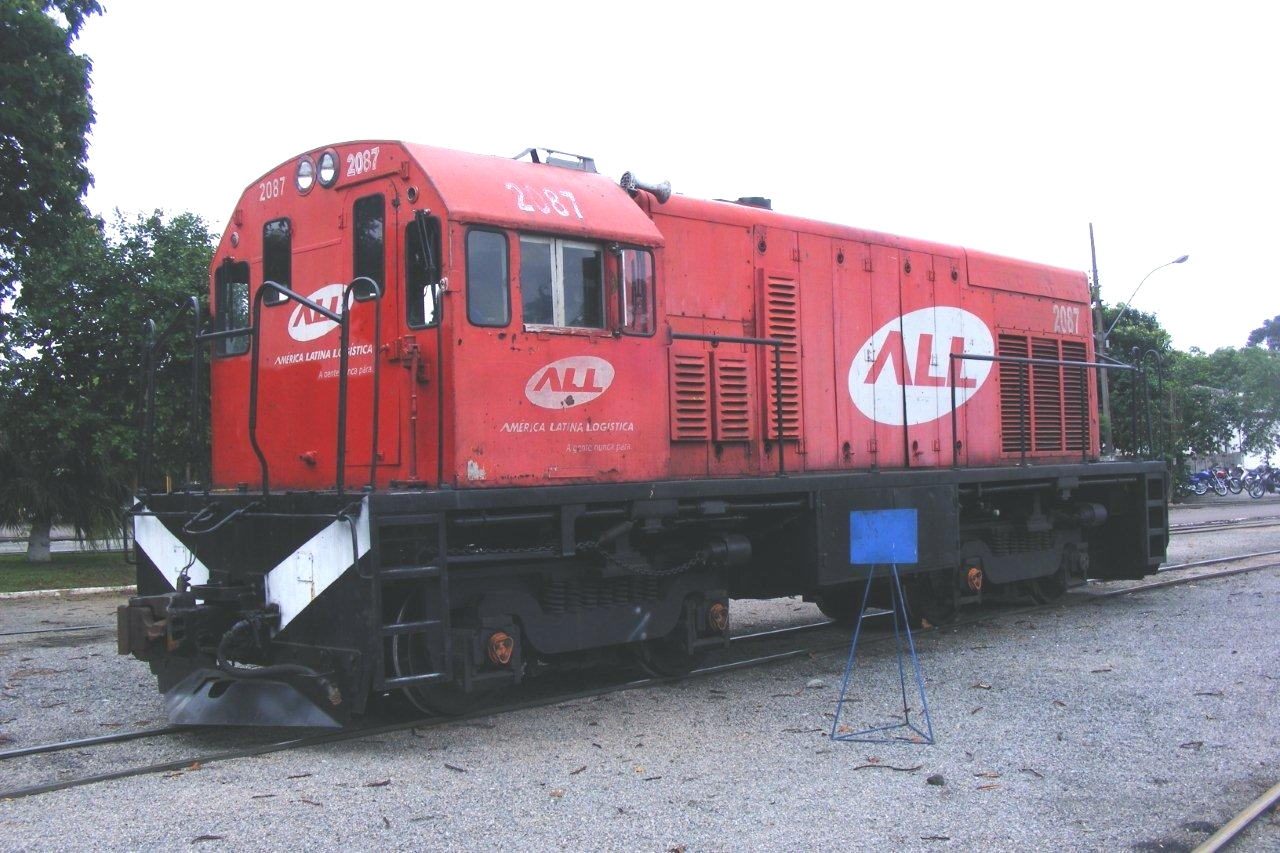
GE U5B ALL (América Latina Logística) #2087

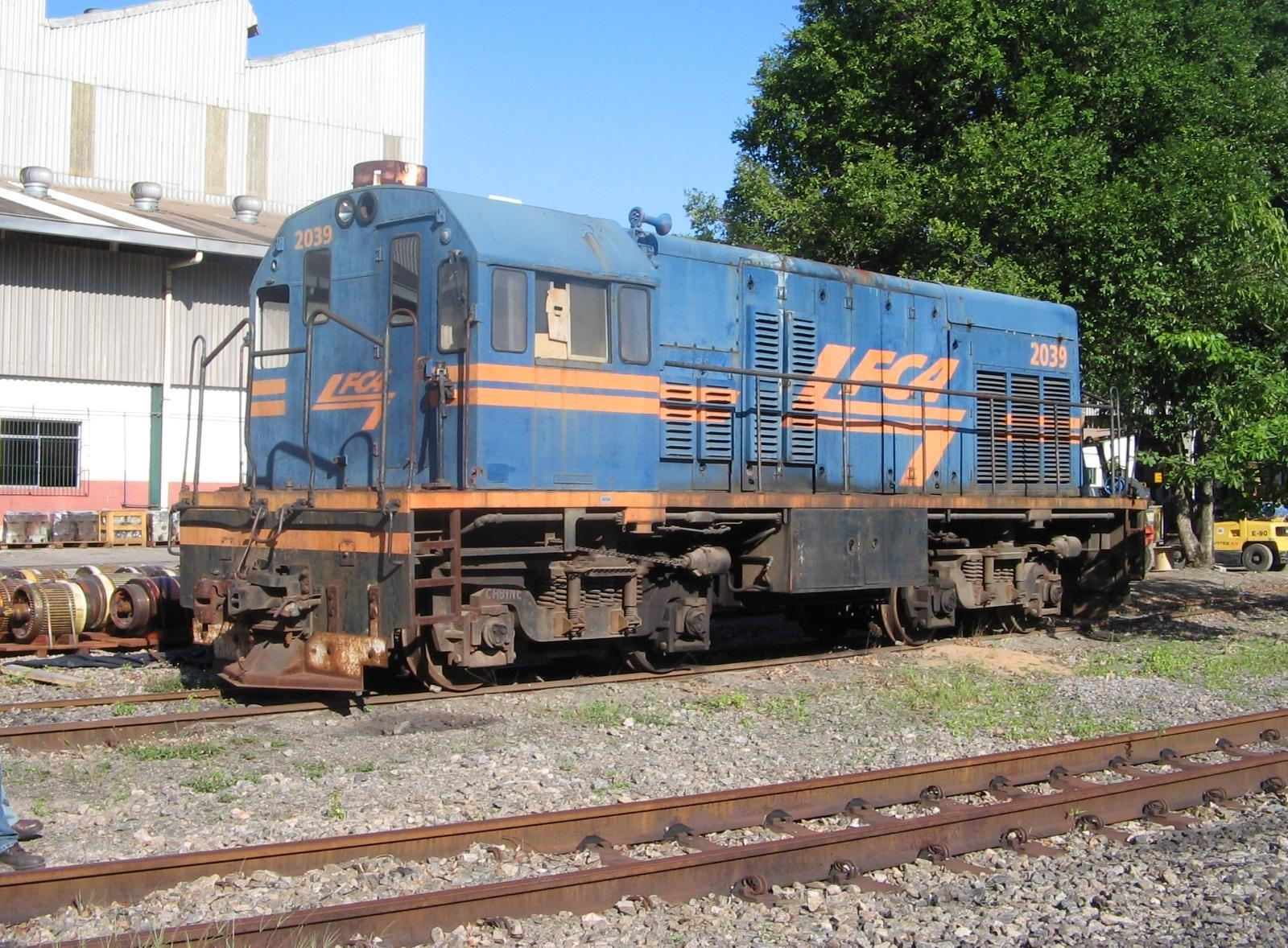
GE U5B FCA (Ferrovia Centro-Atlântica) #2039

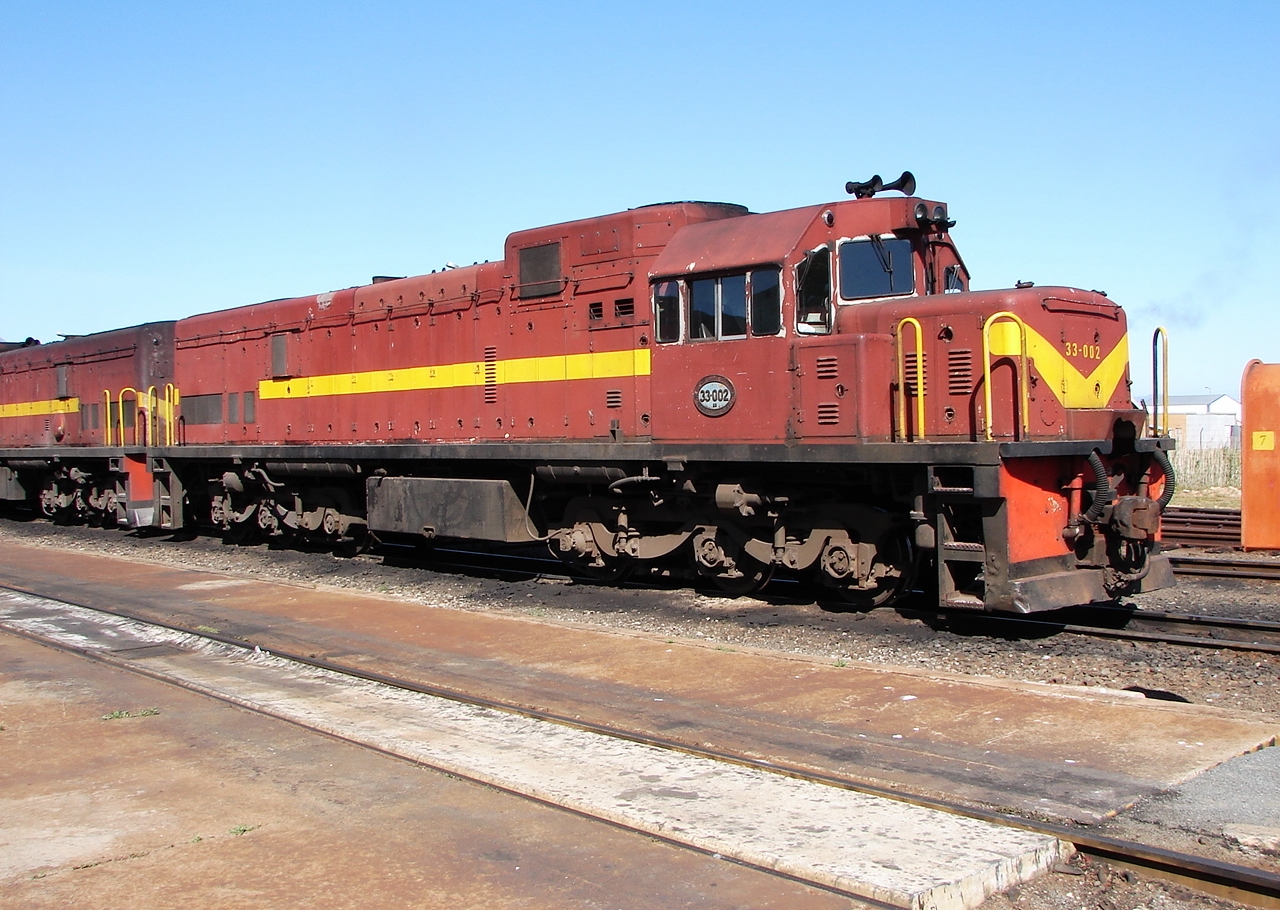
GE U20C, South African Class 33-000 no 33-002

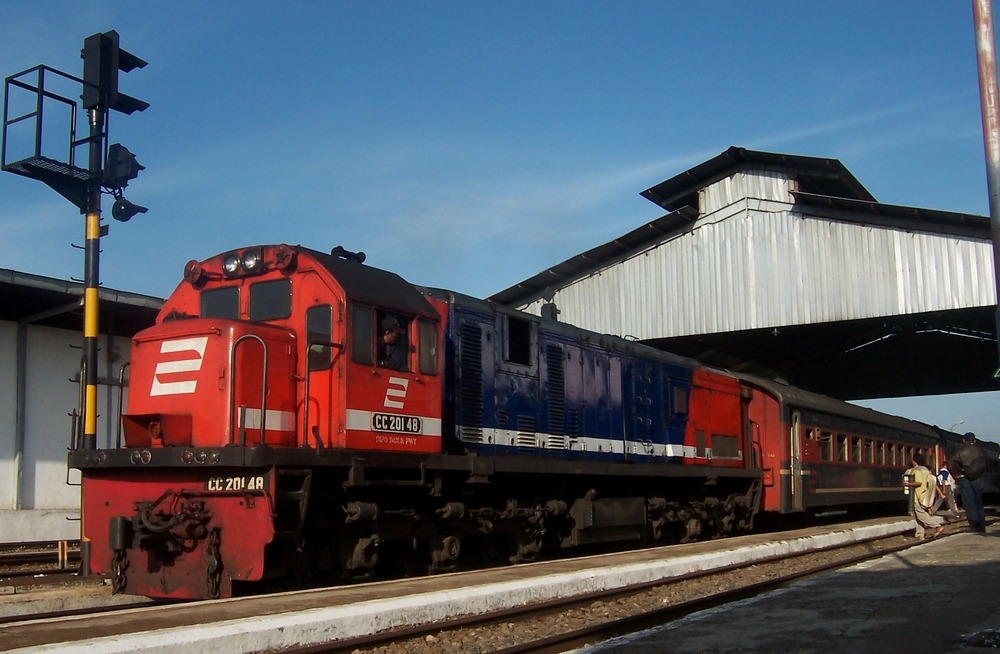
GE U18C, Indonesian Class CC201 no 48 (CC201 48)

== Further developments ==
Parallel to the developments of domestic US locomotives, 'Dash-7' versions of Universal Series locomotives were produced, among others, C18-7i (Egypt and Uruguay), C20-7i and C24-7i (Pakistan), C22-7i (Argentina), and C30-7i (Iran and Mongolia). The ADTranz 'Blue Tiger' (DE-AC33C) was a high-powered locomotive designed for the export market. During its short production run, three variations were produced: Germany (1435 mm gauge, 7FDL12 engine, 21 t axle load), Malaysia (1000 mm gauge, 7FDL12 engine, 20 t axle load), and Pakistan (1676 mm gauge, 7FDL16 engine).

As of 2022, no Universal Series locomotive remained in the Wabtec (successor to GE Transportation) catalog. However, the C30ACi and C21EMP-C25EMP series are the direct descendants of the U18C lineage; while the C20ACi is the descendant of the U12C series. Examples of the modern-day versions of Universal Series locomotives are Chilean C23EM, Indonesian C20EMP and CM20EMP, and Pakistani C20EMP locomotives.

== See also ==
- List of GE locomotives
