= GE U20C =

Indonesian diesel-electric locomotive

GE U20C CC203
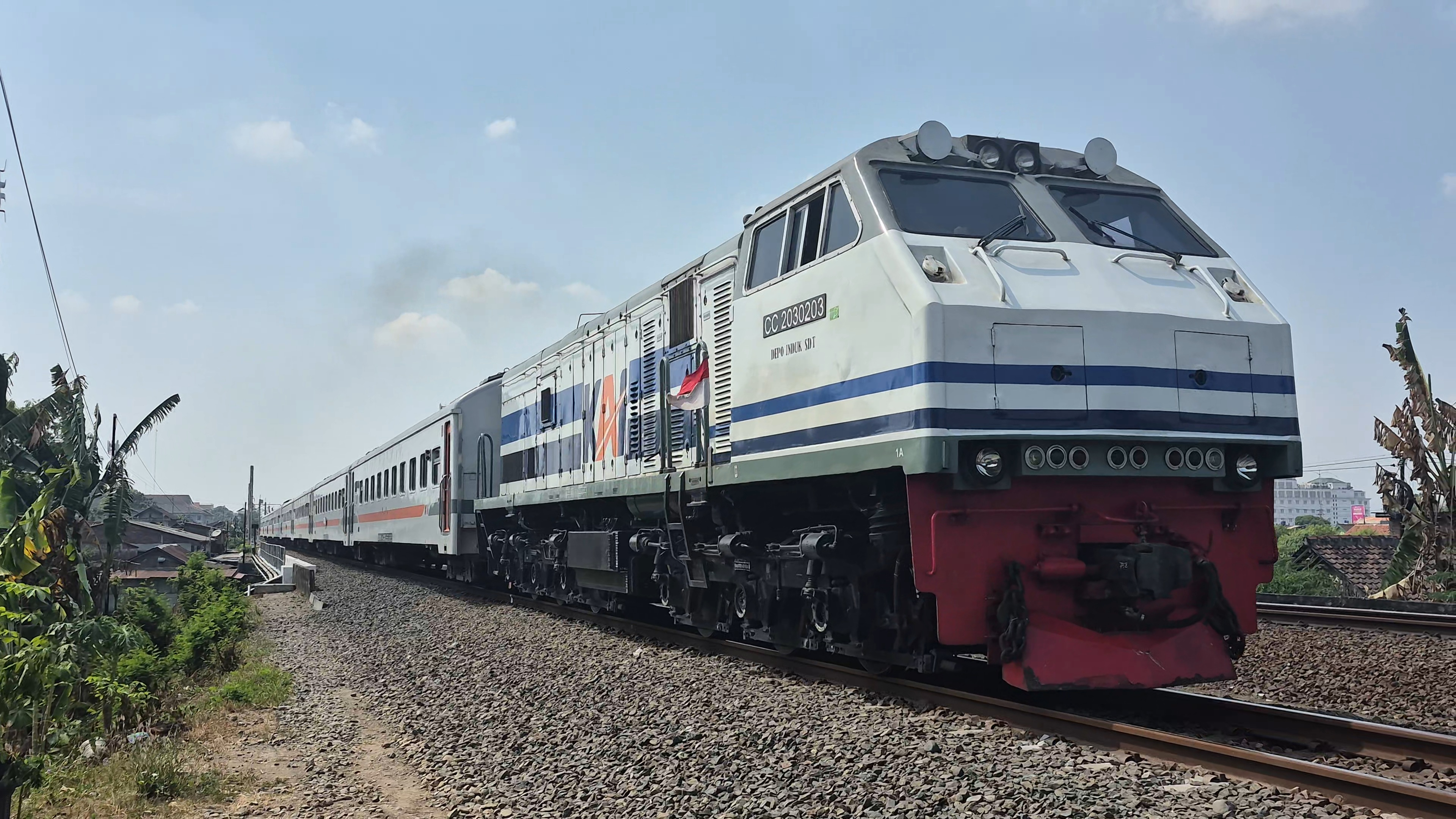
- GE U20C unit number CC 203 02 03 of PT Kereta Api Indonesia with white and blue pattern livery Hauled Pasundan train passing at Yogyakarta Station.
Type and origin
- Power type: Diesel–electric
- Designer: General Electric, UGL Rail (for Indonesian U20C locomotives)
- Builder: GE Transportation Systems; PT GE Lokomotif Indonesia
- Serial number: CC203
- Model: U20C
- Build date: 1995–2000
- Total produced: 42
Specifications
- Configuration
  - AAR: C-C
  - UIC: Co-Co
- Gauge: 1,067 mm (3 ft 6 in) in Indonesia, 1,000 mm (3 ft 3 3/8 in) metre gauge and 1,600 mm (5 ft 3 in) in Brazil
- Wheel diameter: 914 mm (3 ft 0 in)
- Length: 14,134 mm (46 ft 4.5 in)
- Width: 2,642 mm (8 ft 8.0 in)
- Height: 3,637 mm (11 ft 11.2 in)
- Prime mover: GE FDL-8
- Alternator: GMG-146
- Generator: Main: GE GT601; Auxiliary: GE GY27
- Traction motors: 4 x GE 761
- Cylinders: V8
- Loco brake: WABCO 26L
Performance figures
- Maximum speed: 120 km/h (75 mph) (Indonesian U20C)
- Power output: 2,150 hp (1,600 kW)
- Tractive effort: 59,300 lb (26,900 kg) starting 58,300 lb (26,400 kg) continuous at 21 mph (34 km/h)
Career
- Operators: Indonesia: PT Kereta Api Indonesia
- First run: 1995
- Disposition: 37 in operation, 4 inoperative
- References of key features

The GE U20C diesel–electric locomotive was introduced by GE Transportation Systems as an export model in 1964. It is powered by an 8-cylinder 7FDL-8 engine. This locomotive is used worldwide with many variations and modifications. Different engines may be used, e.g. 7FDL8 and 7FDL12. Like the other members of the Universal series, it can be built to suit all track gauges.

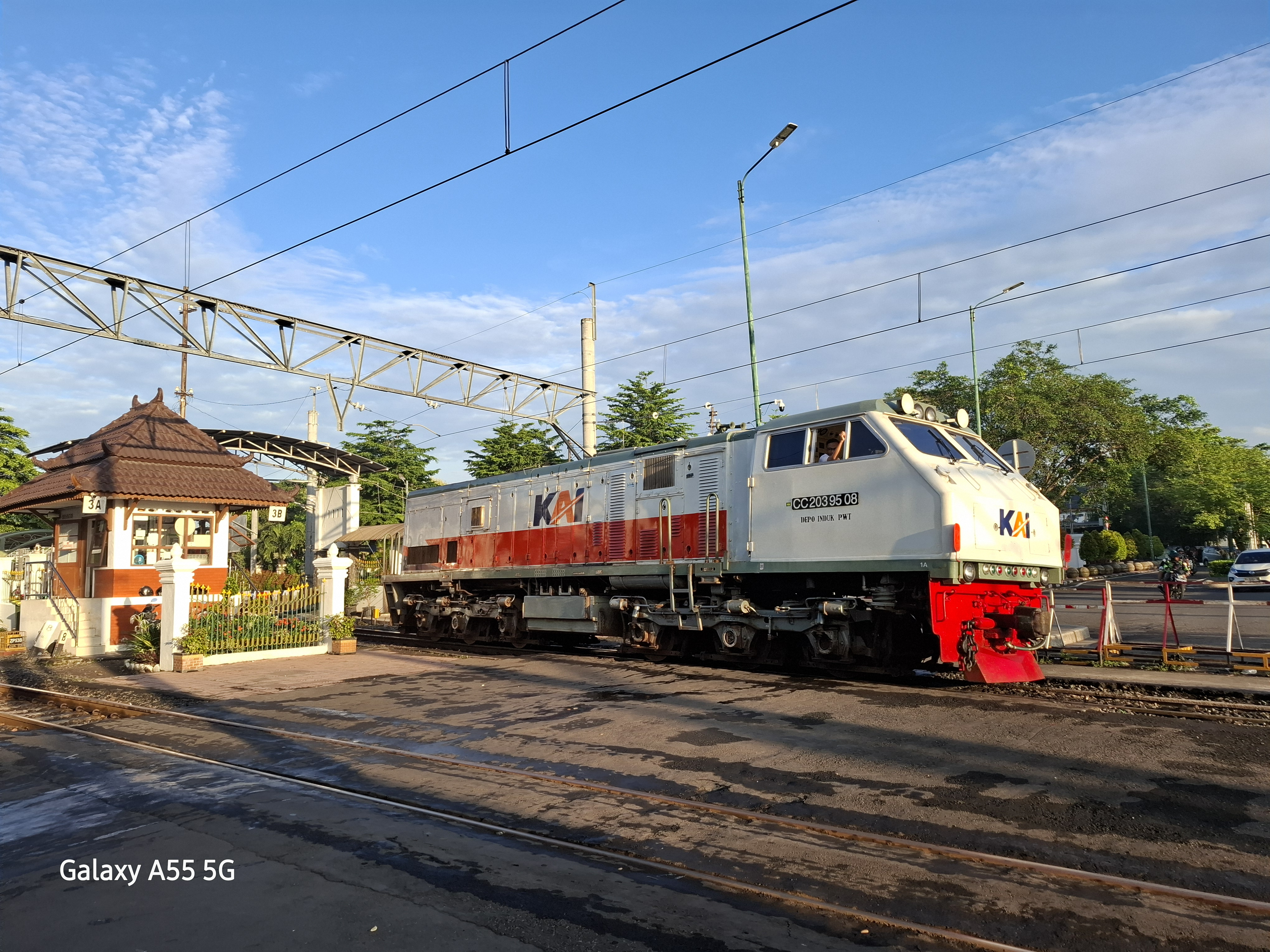
GE U20C of Kereta Api Indonesia passing directly at Yogyakarta Station

== Indonesian U20C ==
=== Export version ===
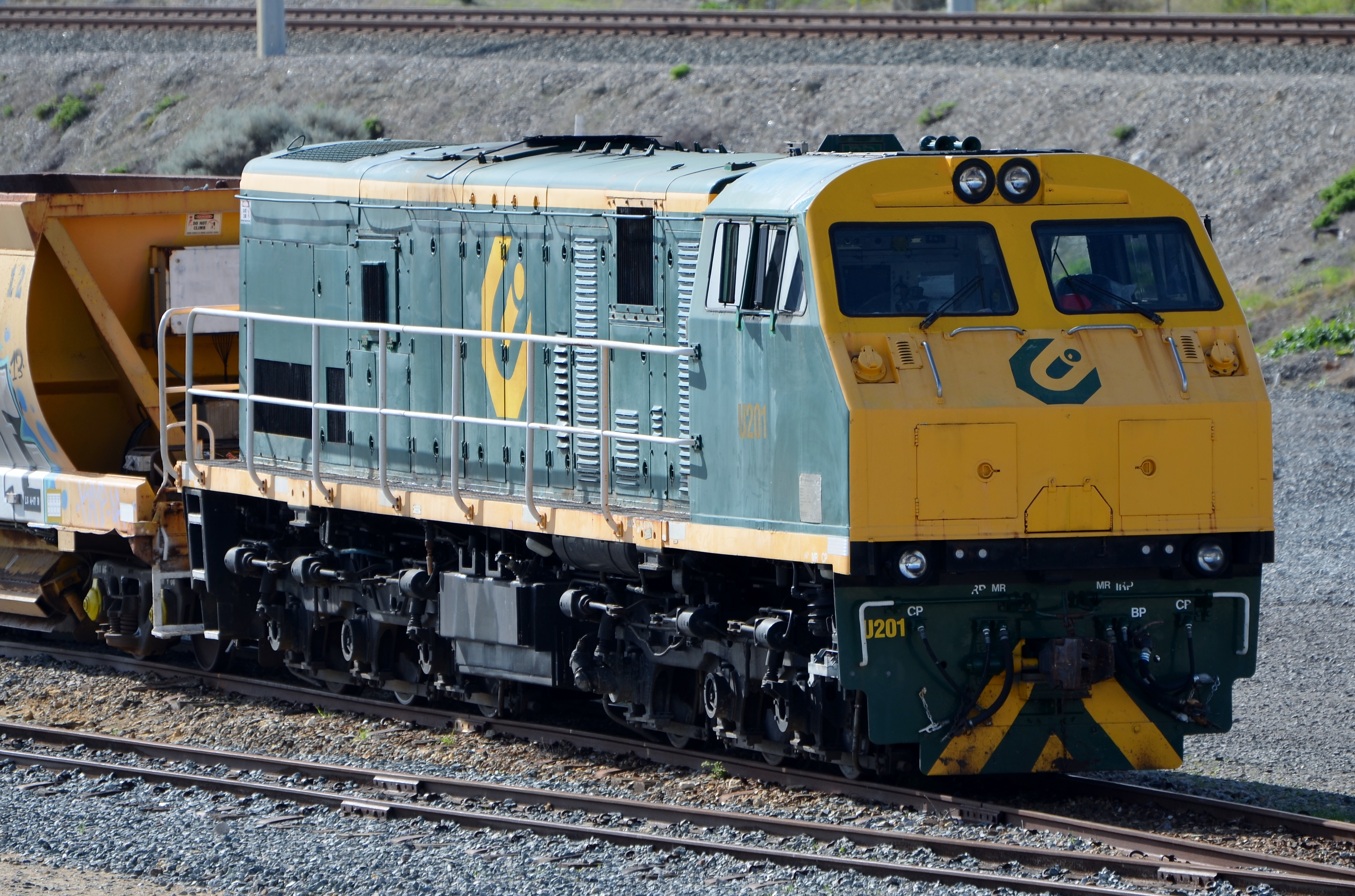
U201 in Australia in 2017.

In 1996, PT Industri Kereta Api Indonesia (PT INKA) made ICTSI #1 for Philippines Port Railways. The locomotive was among the first batch produced by GE Lokomotif Indonesia. It has the same specifications as an average Indonesian CC 203. However, after 7 years of revenue service, the container rail service was shut down. The locomotive was refurbished and was shipped to Australia for Coote Industrial Company. After strip down inspections and maintenance, the locomotive was put back on revenue service.

Around 2015, the locomotive (renumbered U201) was acquired by Transperth Train Operations - the commuter rail operator of Perth, Western Australia - whose fleet otherwise consists solely of electric multiple units. U201 replaced Transperth's earlier diesel shunter, a Westrail MA-class locomotive, which was acquired by Hotham Valley Railway.

== See also ==
- List of GE locomotives
- GE U18C
