= GE boxcab =

Line of diesel-electric switcher locomotives

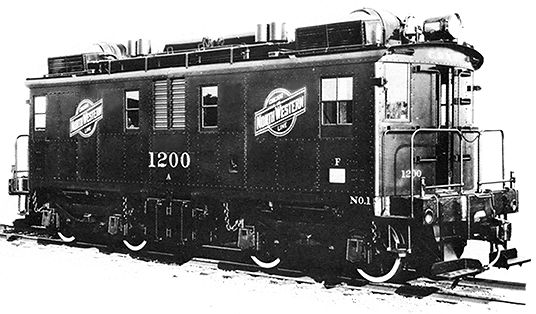
- Chicago and Northwestern #1200
Type and origin
- Power type: Diesel-electric
- Designer: General Electric
- Build date: 1928–1930
- Total produced: 2 60-ton units 11 100-ton units 1 120-ton unit
Specifications
- Configuration
  - AAR: B-B
  - UIC: Bo'Bo'
- Gauge: 4 ft 8 1/2 in (1,435 mm)
- Fuel type: Diesel
- Prime mover: Ingersoll Rand
- RPM range: 550 maximum
- Engine type: 4-stroke diesel
- Displacement: 942 cu in (15.4 L)
- Generator: GE 200 kW (270 hp) 600 V
- Traction motors: GE nose-suspended
- Cylinders: 60-ton units: 1 x 6; 100-ton units: 2 x 6; 100-ton units: 1 x 6
- Cylinder size: 60-ton and 100-ton units: 10 in (254.0 mm) bore 12 in (304.8 mm) stroke 120-ton unit: 14.75 in (374.6 mm) bore 16 in (406.4 mm) stroke
- Couplers: AAR knuckle
Performance figures
- Maximum speed: 35 mph (56 km/h)
- Power output: 60-ton units: 300 hp (220 kW); 100-ton units: 600 hp (450 kW)
- Tractive effort
  - Starting: 100-ton unit: 60,000 lbf (270 kN)
Career
- Operators: 60-ton units: Hoboken Shore Railroad: 1 Ford: 1; 100-ton units: ARMCO: 2 Illinois Central Railroad: 6 Foley Brothers Construction: 1 Chicago and North Western: 1 Erie Railroad: 1 Canadian National Railway: 1 Ford: 1 Hoboken Shore Railroad: 1 Belt Railway of Chicago: 1
- Nicknames: Tin Horse
- Withdrawn: 1960s, 1970s
- Disposition: 1 preserved in California State Railroad Museum, remainder scrapped

The GE boxcabs, sometimes also GE IR boxcabs, were diesel-electric switcher locomotives succeeding the ALCO boxcabs. The locomotives were built by General Electric and Ingersoll Rand without ALCO. Production lasted from 1928 to 1930. These boxcabs were often termed oil-electrics to avoid the use of the German name Diesel, unpopular after World War I.

== History ==
In 1913, GE combined an internal combustion engine with electric traction motors in the GE 57-ton gas-electric boxcab. Impetus for wider adoption of this technology was provided by improved control systems introduced around 1920 and the State of New York's 1926 Kaufman Act, which banned the use of steam locomotives within the New York metropolitan area. A consortium consisting of ALCO, GE and Ingersoll Rand started series production of the ALCO Boxcabs in 1925, also called AGEIR Boxcabs according to the initials of the company names. The consortium's boxcabs were pioneering examples of diesel-electric locomotives, and the first to prove commercially successful. The consortium built 26 locomotives of the 60-Ton model and 7 of the 100-ton model up to 1928.

ALCO dropped out of the arrangement in 1928, after acquiring their own diesel engine manufacturer in McIntosh & Seymour and went on to start its line of diesel switchers. GE and Ingersoll Rand went on with the production of the former ALCO boxcabs, but without ALCO. The locomotives were built in the GE plant in Erie, Pennsylvania, except the unit for Canadian National Railway (CN), which was built by the railroad itself in their workshop. Fourteen units were built after ALCO's withdrawal: two 50-ton units, eleven 100-ton units and one 120-ton unit. The 120-ton unit was an experimental unit with one larger 6 cylinder engine. The last 100-ton unit was produced in 1930 on stock and sold in 1935 to the Belt Railway of Chicago, where it was given the road number 301.

== Models ==
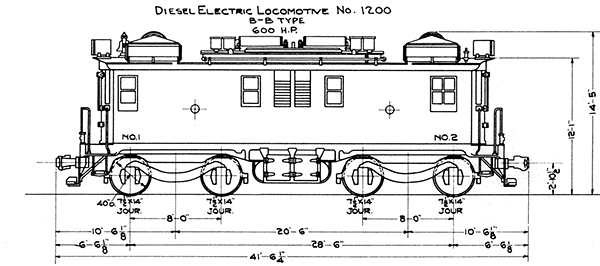
Diagram of 100-ton unit CNW #1200

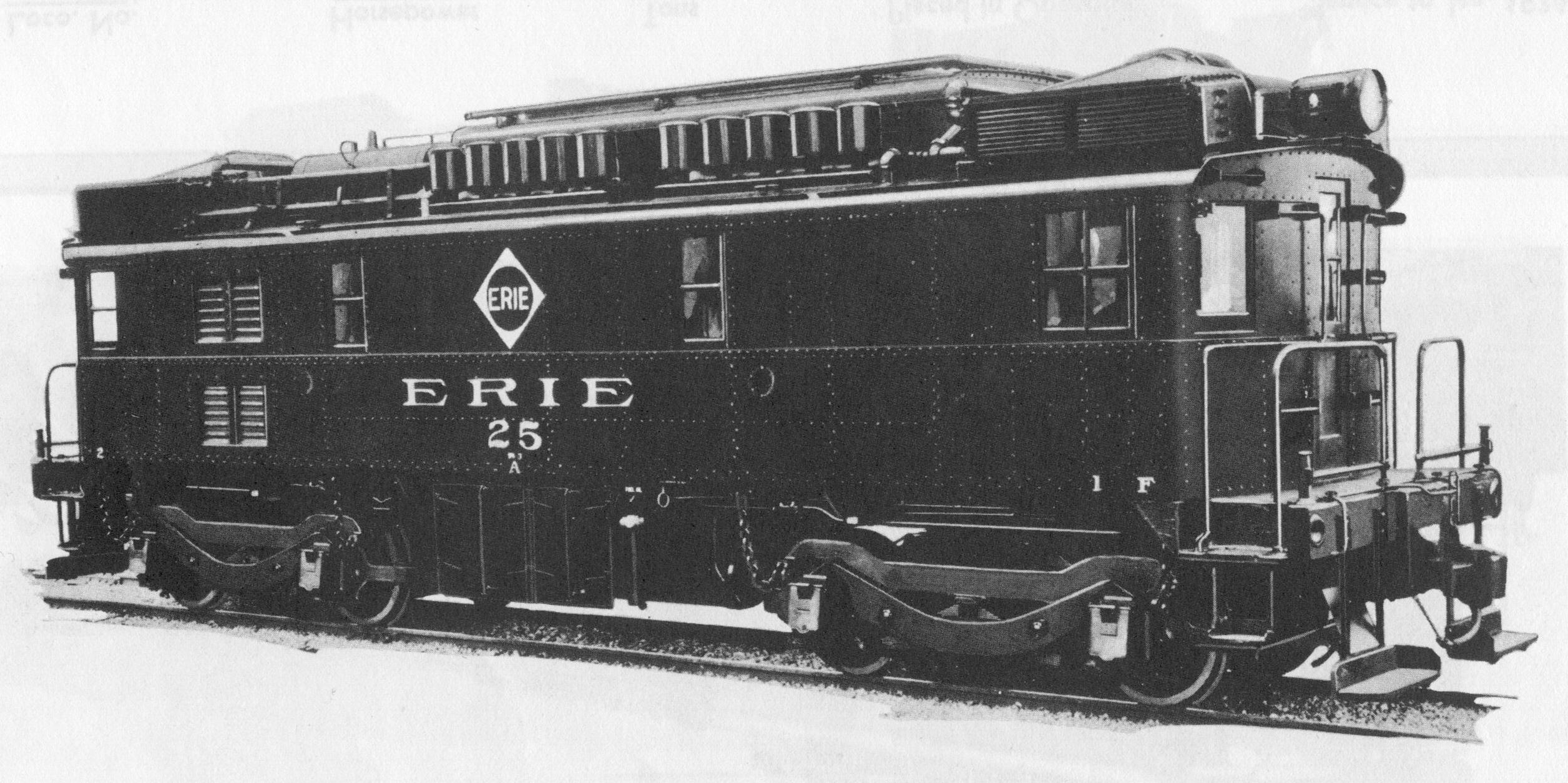
800 hp locomotive for Erie Railroad

All models have chassis and running gear, generator, traction motors and controls from GE, and Ingersoll Rand provided its 10 × 12 diesel engine. The principle of operation was the same as modern locomotives, the diesel engine driving a main generator of 600 volts DC with four axle-hung traction motors. In contrast to the ALCO boxcabs having a design with side doors and ladders the GE boxcabs have front doors and end platforms with steps. The underframe was cast steel. The radiator system was sitting on the roof of the locomotive. At each locomotive end a GE Model CD65 motor with a Sturtevant multivane fan was pressing air through the radiators.

Two models were in series production and two versions were only produced once:

- a 60-Ton locomotive with a six-cylinder four-stroke in-line engine of 300 hp.
- a 100-Ton locomotive with two of the same engines as the 60-Ton model
- a 120-Ton locomotive with a single six-cylinder 800 hp unit (1 prototype built for Erie Railroad)

== Surviving examples ==
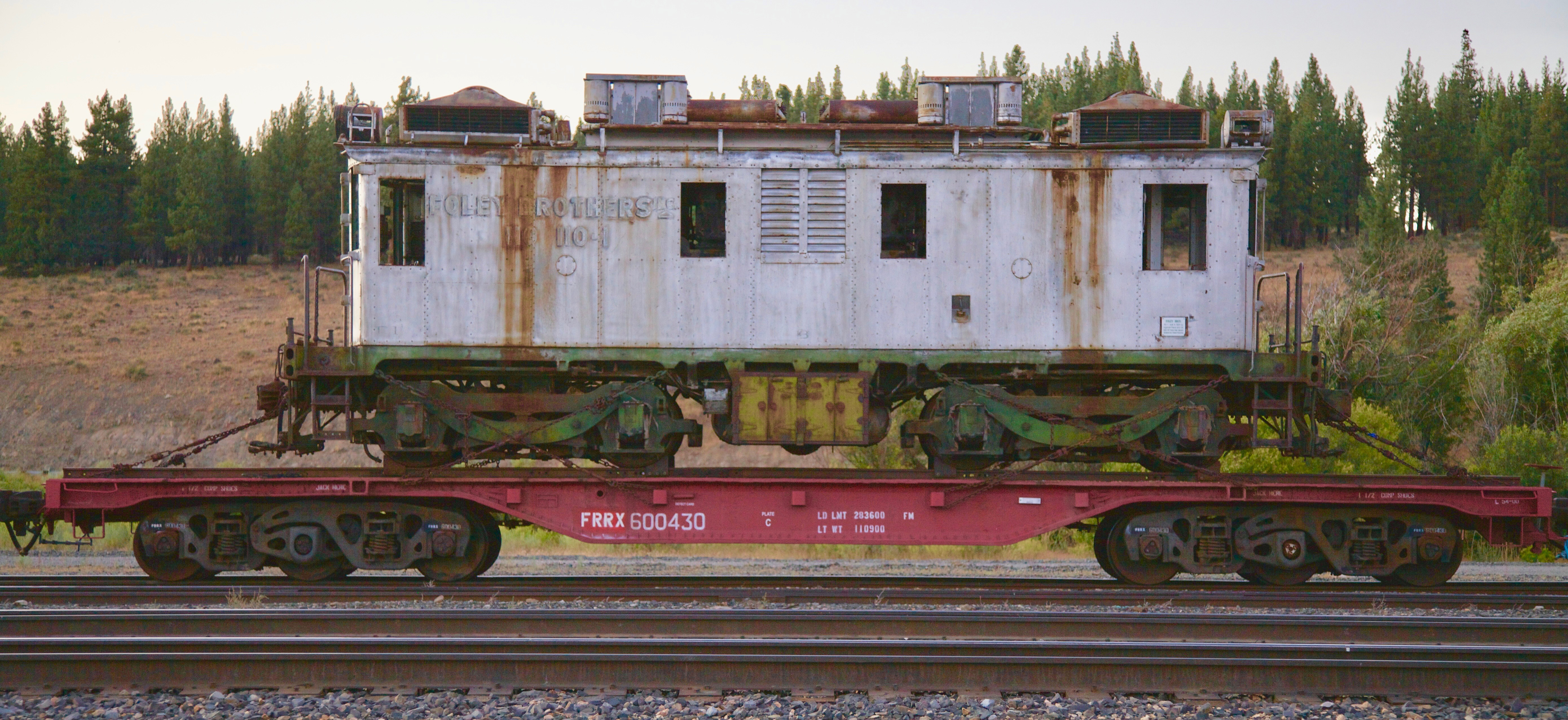
Foley Brothers 110-1 sitting on the siding in Portola, CA across from the Western Pacific Railroad Museum. The flatcar has an extra set of flangless wheels on each of its trucks to handle this heavy locomotive.

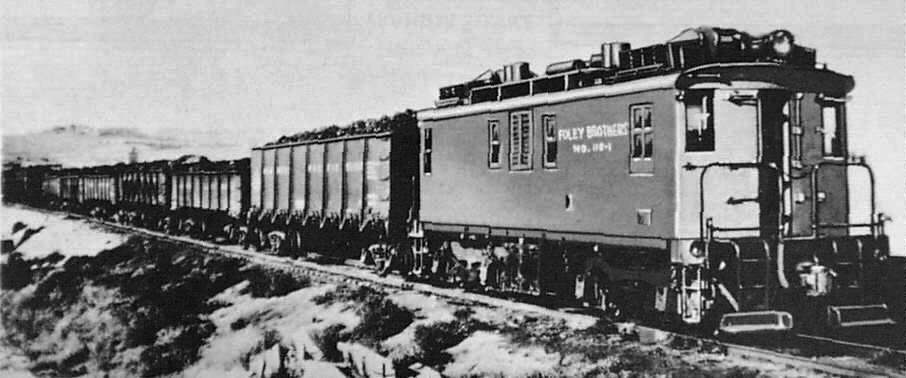
Foley Brothers 110-1 working in the coal mine in Colstrip, Montana.

The only surviving GE boxcab is the 100-ton unit built in December 1929 and delivered to the contractor Foley Brothers in January 1930. It was used with the road number 110-1 for pulling coal trains in a Northern Pacific Railway owned mine in Coalstrip, Montana until it was withdrawn somewhere in the 1960s and later ended up in the Western Pacific Railroad Museum in Portola, CA. In December 2011 it was moved to the California State Railroad Museum in Sacramento CA.

== Bibliography ==
- Vicknair, Eugene John (2000). "The little engines that did" (PDF). The Train Sheet (99): 7–10.
