= GE B39-8 =

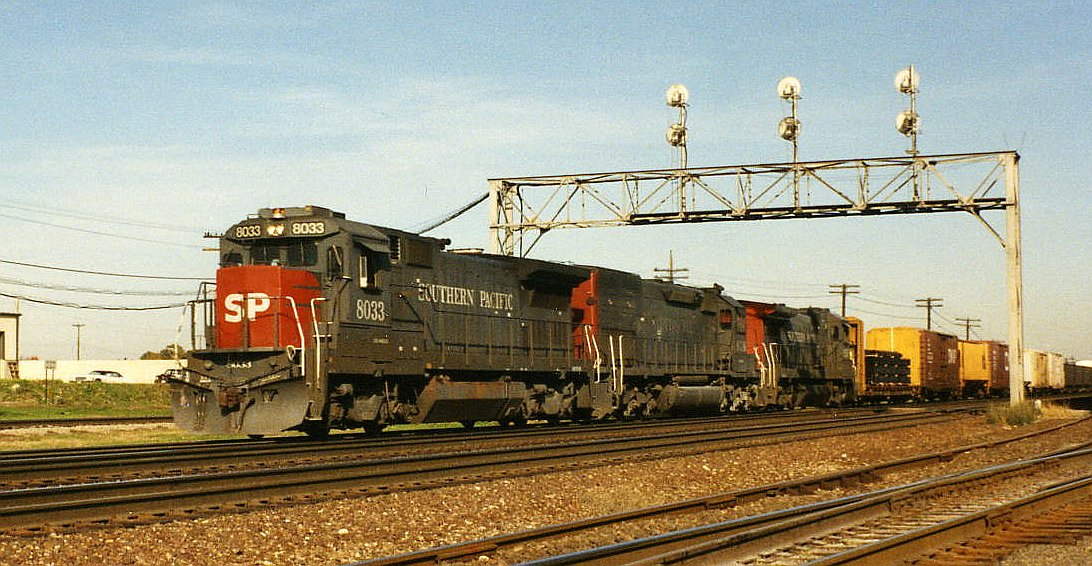
- SP 8033, a B39-8, leads an EMD SD40T-2 and another GE locomotive westbound through Aurora, Illinois.
Type and origin
- Power type: Diesel-electric
- Builder: GE Transportation Systems
- Model: B39-8
- Build date: January 1984 – July 1988
- Total produced: 146
Specifications
- Configuration
  - AAR: B-B
- Gauge: 4 ft 8 1/2 in (1,435 mm) standard gauge
- Wheel diameter: 40 in (1,016 mm)
- Minimum curve: 39°
- Length: 66 ft 4 in (20.22 m)
- Width: 10 ft 1 1/2 in (3.086 m)
- Height: 14 ft 11.5 in (4.559 m)
- Loco weight: 280,000 lb (130,000 kg)
- Fuel type: Diesel
- Prime mover: GE 7FDL-16
- RPM range: 450-1050
- Engine type: 45° V16, four stroke cycle
- Alternator: GMG 186
- Traction motors: (4) GE 752AF
- Cylinders: 16
Performance figures
- Maximum speed: 70 mph (110 km/h)
- Power output: 3,900 hp (2,908 kW)
- Tractive effort: 68,500 lb (31,100 kg) starting, 68,000 lb (31,000 kg) continuous
Career
- Locale: North America

The GE B39-8 is a 4-axle diesel-electric locomotive built by GE Transportation Systems. It is part of the GE Dash 8 Series of freight locomotives. Following the production of the first three units for the Atchison, Topeka and Santa Fe Railway, GE made many mechanical and electrical improvements that were reflected in a redesigned carbody for the remainder of production; these later units are sometimes unofficially referred to as B39-8E.

== Original owners ==
Railroad	Quantity	Road numbers	Notes
Atchison, Topeka and Santa Fe Railway	3	7400-7402	
General Electric (demonstrator)	1	808	rebuilt from the unique B36-8
General Electric Leasing (LMX)	102	8500-8599, 8503 (2nd), 8540 (2nd)	long term lease units for Burlington Northern Railroad. Original 8503 and 8540 wrecked and rebuilt by GE as GECX 8000-8001
Southern Pacific Railroad	40	8000-8039	All units have been passed on to Union Pacific and were rebuilt into B40-8s.

== See also ==
- List of GE locomotives
