= New York Central R-Motor =

NYC R Motor
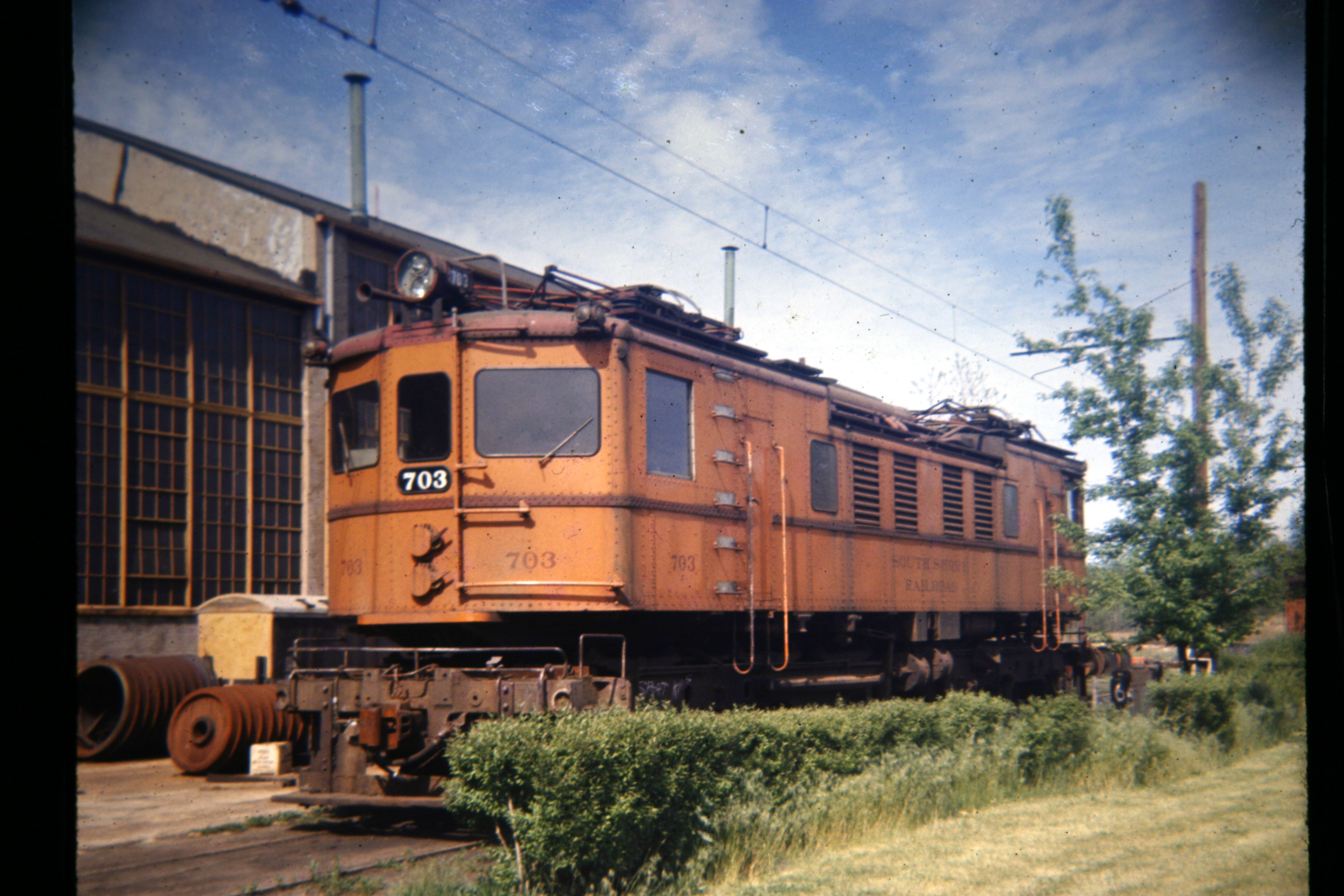
- Chicago South Shore and South Bend Railroad ALCO-GE R-2 #703 at Michigan City, Indiana in May 1966
Type and origin
- Power type: Electric
- Builder: ALCO-GE
- Build date: R: 1926; R-2: 1930-1931
- Total produced: R: 1 R-2: 42
Specifications
- Configuration
  - AAR: R: B-B+B-B; R-2: C-C
  - UIC: R: (Bo′Bo′)+(Bo′Bo′); R-2: (Co)(Co)
- Gauge: 4 ft 8 1/2 in (1,435 mm)
- Driver dia.: 44 in (1,118 mm)
- Length: R: 68 ft 0 in (20.73 m); R-2: 54 ft 0 in (16.46 m)
- Loco weight: R: 345,000 lb (156.5 tonnes); R-2: 266,400 lb (120.8 tonnes)
- Electric system/s: 660 V DC
- Current pickup: Third rail
- Traction motors: R: 8 × GE 286A; R-2: 6 x GE 286B
- Transmission: Resistance controlled DC current supplied to DC nose suspended traction motors.
Performance figures
- Maximum speed: 60 mph (97 km/h)
- Power output: R: 4,000 hp (3,000 kW); R-2: 3,000 hp (2,200 kW)
- Tractive effort: R: 88,500 lbf (394 kN); R-2: 66,600 lbf (296 kN)

R-Motor was the class designation given by the New York Central one prototype and a later fleet of 42 ALCO-GE built electric freight locomotives for use in the New York Electrified Zone. In conjunction with the P Motors, the Rs marked the second generation of electric locomotives built for the New York Central. Also like the P Motors they used advanced nose suspended traction motors and the R-2s were some of the first North American locomotives to make use of the C-C wheel arrangement, which later became the standard for diesel electric road freight.

The first R Motor was developed as a response to the Kaufman Act which banned steam locomotive use throughout the city and required the New York Central to eliminate street running along its 10th Avenue freight route. After evaluating the first R class prototype for freight service, a modified design of 42 additional class R-2 locomotives were ordered and spent their careers working out of the limelight hauling freight on the West Side Freight Line and other portions of the electrified zone. Later, a few R-2s were sent for Detroit River Tunnel service to supplement the aging steeplecab electric locomotive fleet until a new ventilation system for diesel operations was installed in 1953. In the 1950s some Rs were sold to the Chicago, South Shore and South Bend for freight service on that road.

== History ==
In order to comply with the Kaufman Act, the New York Central railroad was faced with the elevation and electrification of its extensive West Side freight services, which served a busy waterfront and industrial area. Its previous electrification project into Grand Central Terminal in 1906 had consisted mainly of passenger operations and thus the railroad had no dedicated electric units for freight service. In 1926 the NYC ordered a prototype freight locomotive from ALCO-GE which was able to make use of lighter electric motors that could be geared to the axles instead of being built around them in the Bi-polar type design.

The prototype, classed R, consisted of two semi-permanently coupled units numbered 1200-1201, each with a B-B wheel configuration and 4 500 hp traction motors. Total length was only 68 feet as the unit was anticipated to need a tight turning radius to work the new West Side elevated line. After several years of testing a simpler, single unit design was chosen for mass production with a C-C wheel arrangement that provided more pulling power than B-B, but without the complexity of the 4 bogie design.

The new class of 42 C-C locomotives was classed R-2 and numbered 1202-1243 with each providing a more manageable 3000 hp. Design of the cab was very similar to the P-Motors built only a year earlier, but without the long porch line structures in front that supported the leading wheels. The powered trucks of the R-Motors were also nearly identical to those found on the P-Motors.

Like many other classes of locomotives, the R-Motors soon found their duties being taken over by the quickly advancing technology of diesel locomotives. The R prototype was converted into a pair of diesel hauled hump trailers in 1945 and the Central began to use the large R-2 fleet in other roles. In the 1940s several were sent to pull trains through the electrified Detroit River Tunnels, returning in 1953 when the tunnels were ventilated for diesel operations. In 1955, ten R-2 Motors were sold to the Chicago South Shore and South Bend Railroad to supplement their electrified freight operations. Seven units, CSS&SB 701-707, were rebuilt to use 1500 V DC overhead lines using parts left over from the conversion of the P-Motors to 660 V DC third rail. The front ends were also modified moving the cab door from the front to a more typical side access.

The NYC Rs were scrapped in the 1950s and 60s, while the South Shore units survived into the 1970s. None were preserved.
