= GE B30-7 =

Diesel-electric locomotive

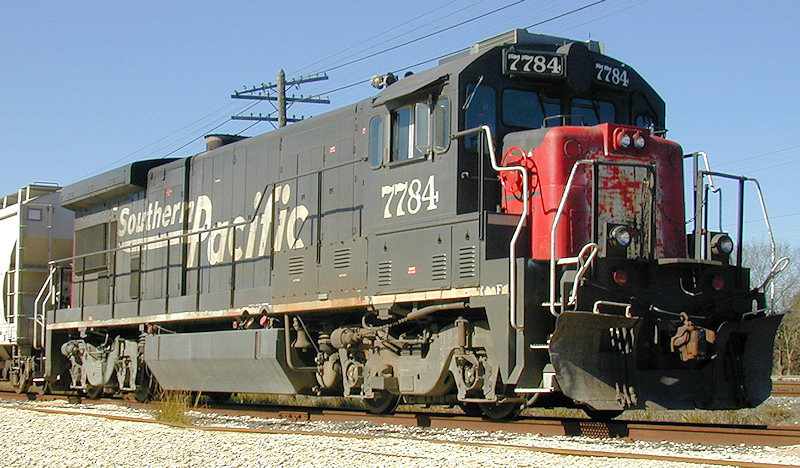
- St Louis Southwestern (SSW), aka Cotton Belt #7784 in Rosenberg, Texas, January 5, 2001, very late in life.
Type and origin
- Power type: Diesel-electric
- Builder: GE Transportation Systems
- Build date: December 1977 – October 1983
- Total produced: 399
Specifications
- Configuration
  - AAR: B-B
- Gauge: 4 ft 8 1/2 in (1,435 mm) standard gauge
- Length: 61 ft 2 in (18.64 m)
- Prime mover: GE FDL-16
- Engine type: V16 diesel V12 diesel for B30-7A variants
- Cylinders: 16; 12 for B30-7A variants
Performance figures
- Power output: 3,000 hp (2,200 kW)
Career
- Locale: North America

The GE B30-7 is a diesel-electric locomotive model produced by GE from 1977 to 1983 as part of their Dash 7 Series, featuring a 16 cylinder engine producing 3,000 horsepower. A total of 399 units were produced, including 120 cabless B30-7A units. The B30-7AB/A(B) is an unofficial model. The B30-7 was GE's successor to the U30B.

== Design and production history ==
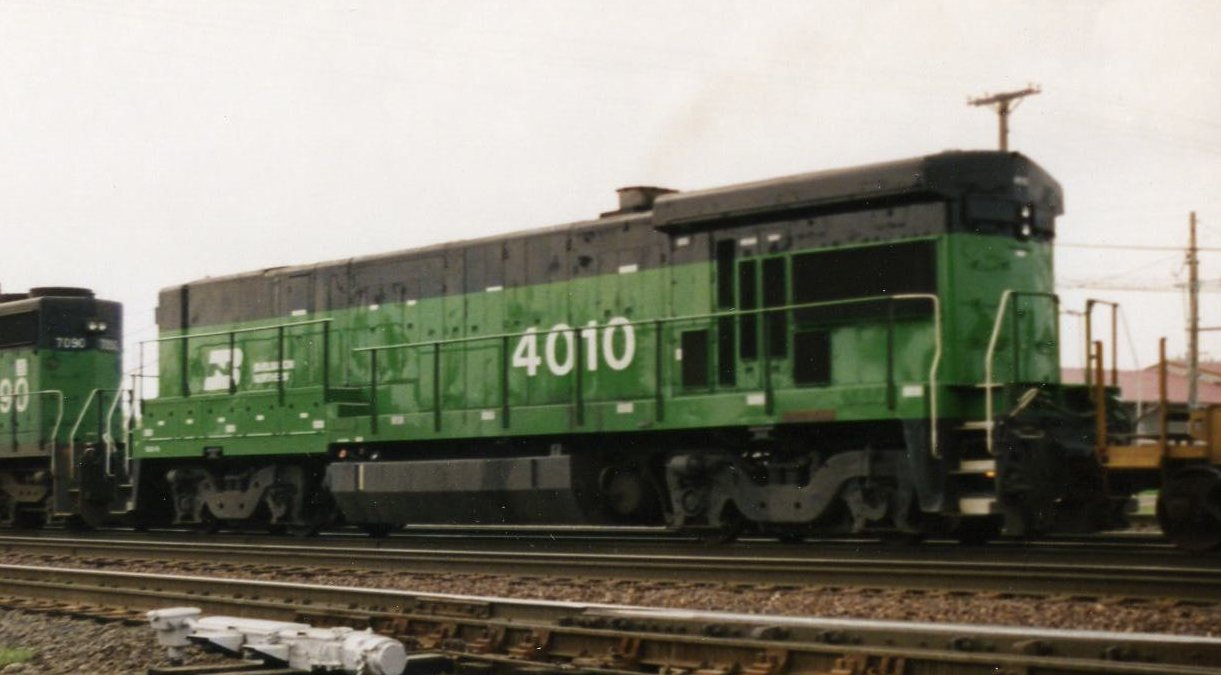
BN 4010, a B30-7A, working in Aurora, Illinois, in 1993.

The B30-7 was designed from the B23-7, and was nearly identical in appearance. However, the B30-7 featured 3,000 horsepower, compared to the B23-7's 2,300 horsepower. Almost all were built with FB2 trucks.

GE produced several variants of the B30-7. These were developed from an experimental modification of the B23-7's 12-cylinder engine in June 1980 to uprate it to 3,000 horsepower. By using the 12 cylinder prime mover instead of the 16 cylinder version, railroads saved money on fuel and maintenance, and most subsequent B30-7s incorporated a 12-cylinder engine. Variants using this engine were the B30-7A, B30-7A1 and the cabless B30-7A. The B30-7A without a cab is unofficially known as the B30-7A(B) to distinguish it from the version with a cab.

Cabless B30-7A(B)s were built only for the Burlington Northern Railroad.

== Operational history ==
Shortline railroad Providence and Worcester Railroad acquired five ex-BN B30-7A(B) cabless units, reclassified as B30-7AB units, numbered #3004-3008, in 2001. National Railway Equipment acquired these locomotives in 2015. Most of the remaining B30-7A(B)s were retired in 1999.

== Current Operators ==
As of April 2024, two B30-7 or B30-7As remain in remote control master unit service on the Union Pacific Railroad (out of the original 55 that were converted). As of the same time, multiple units also remain on the Minnesota Commercial Railway and West Tennessee Railroad, while the Natchez Railway was attempting to sell theirs.

== Preservation ==
- Chesapeake & Ohio #8272 is preserved at the Lake Shore Railway Museum in North East, Pennsylvania.

== Original owners ==
Image	Railroad	Quantity	Road numbers	Notes
	Burlington Northern Railroad	120	4000-4119	model B30-7A(B) cabless units
	Chesapeake and Ohio Railway	64	8235-8298	Chessie System Paint
	Missouri Pacific Railroad	58	4800-4854	model B30-7A. The first three were an experimental modification of the B23-7.
	St. Louis - San Francisco Railway	8	863-870	rode on Alco trade in trucks
	St. Louis Southwestern Railway	26	7774-7799	
	Seaboard Coast Line Railroad	17	5500-5516	Family Lines Paint
	Southern Pacific Railroad	84	7800-7883	
	Southern Railway	22	3500-3521	model B30-7A1
