= Milwaukee Road class ES-1 =

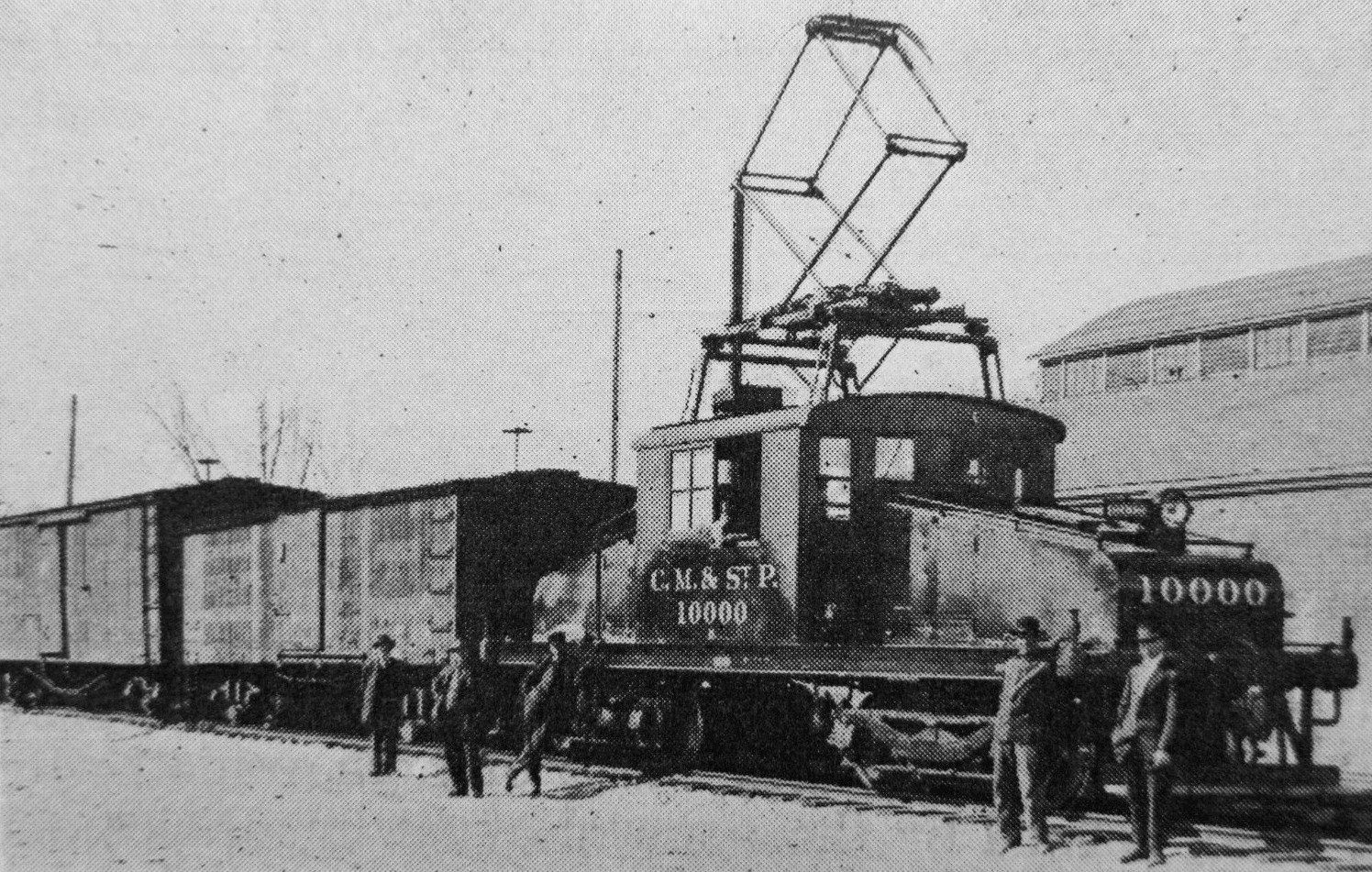
Type and origin
- Power type: Electric
- Builder: General Electric
- Serial number: 4986
- Build date: April 1915
- Total produced: 1
Specifications
- Configuration
  - AAR: B-B
  - UIC: Bo′Bo′
- Gauge: 4 ft 8 1/2 in (1,435 mm) standard gauge
- Loco weight: 98,900 lb (44,900 kg; 44.9 t)
- Electric system/s: 1,500 V DC
Performance figures
- Power output: 316 hp (236 kW) continuous
Career
- Operators: Milwaukee Road
- Class: ES-1
- Numbers: 10000; E85 from March 1939
- Retired: November 1939

The Milwaukee Road's class ES-1 comprised a single electric switcher locomotive built in 1915. It was designed to run on the unique 1,500 V DC electrification in the yard at Great Falls, Montana. It was originally numbered #10000 and was numbered E85 in March 1939. It was retired in November 1939.
