= Paul Chapman (footballer, born 1951) =

Welsh footballer

Personal information
- Full name: Paul Christopher Chapman
- Date of birth: 28 September 1951 (age 75)
- Place of birth: Cardiff, Wales
- Position: Defender

Senior career*
Years	Team	Apps	(Gls)
1969–1970	Plymouth Argyle	3	(0)
- * Club domestic league appearances and goals

Paul Christopher Chapman (born 28 September 1951) is a Welsh former footballer who played in the Football League for Plymouth Argyle.

== Career ==
Chapman played three times for Plymouth Argyle in the 1969–70 season before retiring due to a knee injury.
