= Paul Wadsworth Chapman =

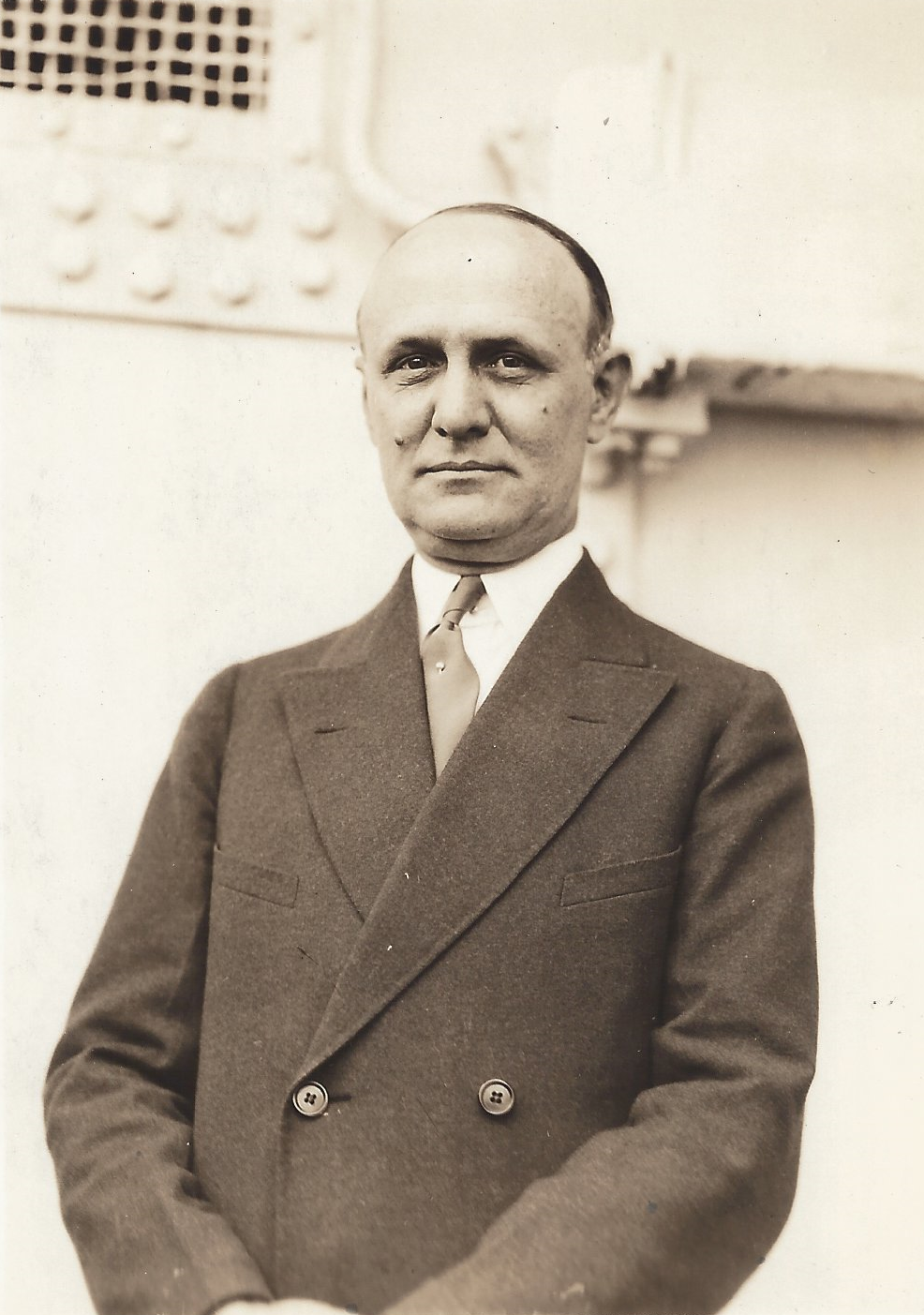
- Profile of Paul Wadsworth Chapman
- Born: Paul Wadsworth Chapman; December 8, 1880; Jerseyville, Illinois
- Died: July 16, 1954 (Age 73); Norwalk, Connecticut
- Occupations: Banker & businessman
- Known for: Founder – P.W. Chapman & Co. Owner – United States Lines
- Spouse: Joanna Norton Highley (1903–1954) (his death)
- Children: Paul Wadsworth Chapman Jr. (1905–1979) Howard Highley Chapman (1907–1993) Theodore Stillman Chapman III (1914–1988) Joanna Chapman (1914–2001) Robert Harris Chapman (1919–2000)

Paul Wadsworth Chapman (1880–1954) was an American banker and businessman based in Chicago. He was the founder of the banking firm P.W. Chapman & Co. (formally Chapman, Mills & Co.) in 1912, and was the owner of United States Lines from 1929 to 1931.

== Early years ==
Paul Wadsworth Chapman was born on December 28, 1880, in Jerseyville, Illinois to Sarah Alvira Landon, age 24, and Theodore Stillman Chapman, age 31. He graduated from Jersey County High School in 1899. After high school, he became a messenger boy at the Harris Trust and Savings Bank. He proudly preserved a formal contract employing him in this capacity at $7 a week. He rose rapidly and became manager of his department. On December 28, 1903, Chapman married Joanna Norton Highley in Chicago Illinois and had five children. In 1910, he began working in the Marquette Building, employed by Harris Trust & Savings Bank as the Manager of the Municipal dept. He Resigned from Harris Trust and Savings bank in 1912 to enter the securities business on his own account, P. W. Chapman & Co., Inc. He maintained offices at 115 West Adams St., Chicago, and at 42 Cedar St. in New York along with branches in thirteen principal cities.

== Acquiring United States Lines ==
In March 1929, Chapman acquired United States Lines from the U.S. Shipping Board along with 11 ships for $16,082,000 of which Leviathan composed $6,782,000 of the price. A flag raising ceremony was held on board the Leviathan, the first of the ships delivered, on April 14, 1929, marking the official company change. Members of both the shipping board and Chapman's company as well as his daughter Joanna were in attendance. Due to the stock market crash in 1929, Chapman and his company began to struggle, and in 1931, he sold United States Lines to the International Mercantile Marine Company. Chapman retired from his company's CEO position in 1944.

== Death ==
Paul Wadsworth Chapman died on July 16, 1954, at the age of 73.
