= Kaufman Act =

New York railroad law

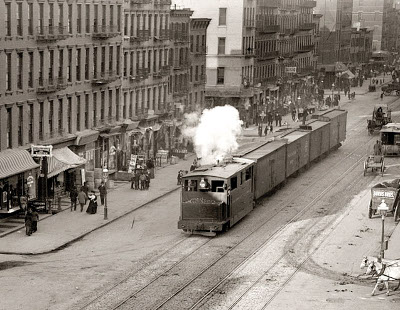
A steam freight train on 10th Avenue; the Kaufman Act would ban steam trains like this one within New York City

The Kaufman Electrification Act of 1923, or Kaufman Act for short, was a law passed by the New York State Legislature, mandated electrification of all railroads in New York City by January 1, 1926. The bill was sponsored by recently elected Republican Assemblyman Victor R. Kaufman and signed by Governor Al Smith on June 2, 1923.

The Act made no exclusions, affecting mainline traffic and freight yards in all boroughs of New York City, including the isolated rail system of Staten Island. The Act led to a large influx of diesel locomotives onto New York City railroads and hastened dieselisation of the American railroads. The railroads objected, initiated lawsuits, and succeeded in overturning the Act as unconstitutional.

== Background ==
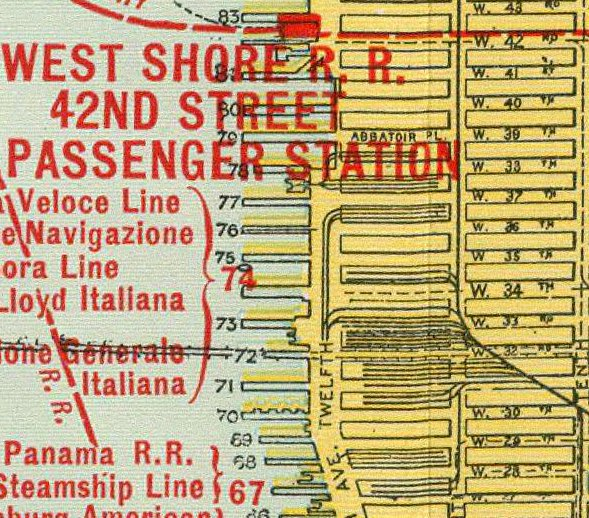
Freight yards and tracks of the West Side (27th to 43rd Streets)

In 1846 the City of New York allowed the Hudson River Railroad Company to lay the tracks for its new line to Albany directly on the streets, "westerly of and including Eighth Avenue or Hudson Street. For more than seventy years steam trains ran directly on major streets and avenues of New York. The elevated rapid transit lines on the Manhattan were converted from steam to third rail electrical traction in 1900–1903, the passenger trunk lines were gradually electrified over the next decades.

On January 8, 1902, fifteen New York, New Haven and Hartford Railroad commuters from New Rochelle were killed when a local New York Central Railroad train from White Plains missed a red light and rear-ended the train stopped in the Park Avenue Tunnel. The accident was linked to exhaust smoke obstructing view of traffic signals. The resulting public outcry led to calls for electrification of the line and replacement of the then-overcrowded Grand Central Depot. In 1903 state legislators passed a law banning steam locomotives from Manhattan after June 30, 1908, and demanding electrification of New York Central Railroad (NYCRR). The company, which had already contemplated electrification, introduced electric traction on its Manhattan trunk lines in the end of 1906. The NYCRR mainline employed third rail electric supply because low clearance in the tunnels ruled out use of overhead lines. The trains changed electric locomotives for steam engines at Croton-Harmon and North White Plains. Other incoming trunk lines were largely electrified by 1923. The isolated Staten Island Railway, operated by Baltimore and Ohio Railroad, remained powered by outdated coal-fired 4-4-0 camelbacks and 2-4-4Ts hauling wooden cars.

However, freight and switching operation remained powered by coal-firing steam engines, contributing to air pollution and road accidents. The NYCRR was the only railroad with north–south tracks connecting Manhattan to upstate New York; the Pennsylvania Railroad operated an east-west passenger service through Penn Station in midtown Manhattan. All other mainline railroads terminated along the New Jersey and Brooklyn shorelines and ferried their railcars to Manhattan by car floats. They operated dozens of big and small rail yards on Manhattan and employed scores of coal-fired switchers. The worst offender was the West Side freight yards below 33rd Street, where coal-firing switchers hauled their cargoes along 11th Avenue (popularly called the "Death Avenue") and adjacent streets in what is now Hudson Yards and Chelsea. The government handled safety and pollution problems separately: ordinances to eliminate grade crossings were effected on a case-by-case basis, complete elimination of steam traction became the target of the 1923 bill introduced by Victor R. Kaufman.

=== Politics ===
The 1923 Kaufman Act was enacted in the shadows of a far larger public debate about the future of the troubled subway system. The Brooklyn Rapid Transit Company was placed under receivership in December 1918 and was heading into liquidation. The Interborough Rapid Transit Company barely escaped bankruptcy in 1921. Post-war inflation devalued the five-cent ticket price fixed in the Dual Contracts of 1913, and the companies defaulted on their investment contracts. They lobbied to raise ticket price and were stonewalled by Democratic New York City mayor John Francis Hylan, who made cheap fares a major campaign issue, (Note: His 1921 campaign motto was "Preservation of democracy and the retention of five-cent fare." The five-cent fare was effective from 1904 to 1948, well past Hylan's term.) denied public help to the BMT and IRT, and demanded public control over the subway. Hylan, determined to nationalize the subway, ran into an open conflict with the moderately minded Transit Commission, which was created by Republican Governor Nathan Lewis Miller in 1921. The new governor Al Smith, elected in November 1922, sided with Hylan on the transit issue, but failed to disband the Commission due to Republican opposition in the State Assembly.

In August 1922 Hylan stirred up the public by announcing the plan to effect forced buy-back provision of the Dual Contracts, which would effectively start nationalization. Hylan also called for a $600 million plan for building the all-new, publicly operated Independent Subway System (IND), which was unbuilt as of yet. The heated discussion that followed coincided with the State Assembly election campaign. Elections of November 1922 brought majority in the Assembly to the Republicans, but in the Senate the Democrats with a very thin edge over the Republicans, although only for one year.

One of the Republican Assemblymen elected from New York City was Victor R. Kaufman, of the Seventh electoral district of Manhattan's West Side. The "boyish-looking" Kaufman was one of the five Republicans who voted against Hylan's popular Traction Bill. In April 1923 he dared to oppose Hylan in a face-to-face public debate in front of pro-Hylan audience. The two discussed subway congestion, public buses, and court systems, and Hylan easily held his ground; he left with a patronizing remark: "Don't be too harsh with the Assemblyman... he is young yet".

== Enactment and reaction ==
The debate on 65th Street occurred just a week after the State Assembly committee issued a go-ahead for Kaufman's electrification bill. Kaufman's proposal had not yet aroused public interest; on April 7, The New York Times barely mentioned as a local ordinance limited to the freight yards along Riverside Drive. Hylan stayed aside from the electrification debate and the bill passed the Assembly vote without much debate. The act was signed by Governor Al Smith on June 2, 1923.

The Act required that by January 1, 1926, all railroad traffic in New York City, Mount Vernon and Yonkers must be converted to electrical traction (which, at the moment, was the only viable alternative to steam). There were no exclusions, and it applied equally to trunk lines, second-tier country lines and even the switchers in the docks and freight yards. The exclave system of Staten Island was not excluded either. Each failure to comply was subject to a $5,000 fine per violation per day. After the vote, but before signature by the Governor, railroads launched a public and political campaign to block the bill. On the eve of the deadline for signing, representatives of the Baltimore & Ohio, New York Central, New York, New Haven & Hartford and Long Island railroads convened in Albany for a last-minute meeting with Al Smith. They cited insurmountable costs of conversion (30 million dollars for the LIRR) and the dangers of electrifying urban at-grade railroads. Kaufman brought his own party of civic activists and businessmen and prevailed: Smith signed the bill on the next day, Saturday, June 2, 1923.

The Act did not attempt to redesign the existing track or decrease at-grade railroad traffic. Kaufman addressed this issue in his 1924 "Death Avenue Bill" that attempted to regulate the NYCRR West Side network. The bill did not pass, and debate over West Side trackage continued into the late 1920s.

== Dieselization ==
=== Outer-borough railroads ===
In March 1924 Baltimore and Ohio Railroad began electrification and elimination of grade crossings of its Staten Island lines, for an estimated cost of $13-to-15 million (not including freight lines). Conversion of the SIRT to electric traction was mostly completed by the end of 1925. Electrification of the 26th Street B&O freight yards was uneconomical, and instead the company ordered its first diesel locomotive. Its predecessor, the GE-IR diesel demonstrator was tested in upstate New York in 1924. B&O's and Manhattan's first commercial 300-hp, 60-ton ALCO boxcab switcher was placed into operation in 1925. Earlier in 1925 Central Railroad of New Jersey put in operation a similar diesel switcher at its 138th Street waterfront terminal in the Bronx. B&O No. 1 and CNJ No. 1000 were the first American diesel locomotives in regular service. They turned out to be reliable and durable, worked into the 1950s and survived to date. In 1925 B&O purchased a gasoline-burning switcher, thus completing their compliance program (their next diesel purchase did not occur until the mid-1930s). The Delaware, Lackawanna and Western Railroad purchased two similar switchers and put one in operation at their 132nd Street Harlem Transfer' yard as Harlem Transfer #2 and the other locomotive as #3001, which was assigned to their 25th Street Freight Station in Brooklyn. Erie Railroad also purchased two 60 ton 300 hp box cabs: #20 which was built in May 1926 and sent to their "Harlem Station" freight terminal, and #19 which was built in September 1928 and operated at their "West 26th Street Freight Station" in Manhattan. Successful introduction of diesel traction led to the 1926 amendment of the 1923 law that allowed operation of diesel locomotives in the city.

The Long Island Rail Road authorized a $4-million conversion plan in April 1924. The New York, New Haven and Hartford Railroad converted its New Haven-New York route to 100% electrical traction in June 1924. The Pennsylvania Railroad made plans for electrification of its three main lines, including Philadelphia-New York, but, as of June 1924, did not have funds to begin work in near future.

The deadline stipulated in the Act was moved twice, in 1924 and 1926; diesel locomotives were permitted, and steam locomotives continued to run in Brooklyn and Queens. The Act hastened dieselisation of the American railroads, creating the small initial market for diesel locomotives.

=== New York Central Railroad ===
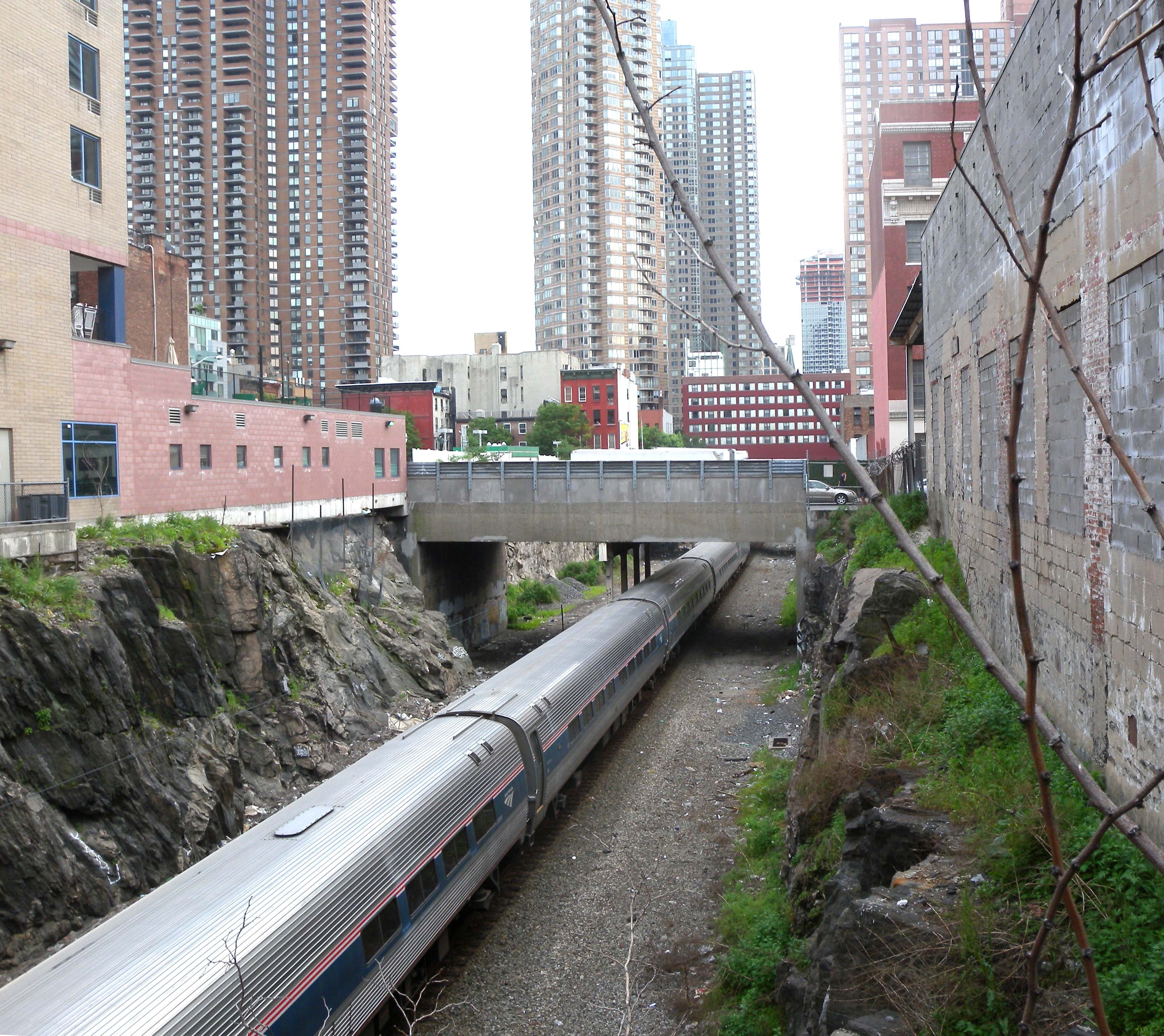
The modern West Side Line runs in an open trench west of 10th Avenue

The NYCRR, on the contrary, had posted record profits for 1923. The railroad finalized its electrification plans and brought it for the State approval in November and December 1924. The plan called for the electrification of the NYCRR West Side Line from St. John's Park to Spuyten Duyvil, Bronx but excluded the West Side freight network. Electrification of the freight network, whether by third rail or overhead lines, was impractical. The NYCRR effectively brought talks to a stalemate by demanding elimination of all grade crossings on the West Side, to allow the same standard of safety and engineering as on its other lines. In November 1925 NYCRR announced a plan to invest $30 million in the electrification of its West Side Line, contingent on the city's decision to close grade crossing. Discussion of this and similar unrealistic proposals dragged for another year.

On December 31, 1925, eight railroads led by the NYCRR secured a temporary injunction against penalties for non-compliance with the Act. They asserted that the $5,000 a day fine will paralyze deliveries of food, mail and business supplies. In March 1926 the railroads and freight terminals initiated a lawsuit against the Kaufman Act. They demanded to make the temporary injunction permanent, indefinitely restraining city and county officials from enforcing the penalties. This times the railroads asserted that enforcement of penalties ($600,000 a day for NYCRR alone (Note: Estimated as $5,000 per each of 120 steam locomotives still in operation.)) is tantamount to outright, unconstitutional confiscation without due process of law, under the Fifth Amendment to the United States Constitution. This allegation allowed them to bring the case directly to federal court presided by Judge Learned Hand. Old arguments of insurmountable costs and unreasonably short notice were brought along too. The State representatives argued that the case falls under state, not federal, jurisdiction, to no avail. Simultaneously, the railroads demanded extensions of the deadline up to five years from the State's commissioners. Judge Hand ruled that the Kaufman Act was unconstitutional inasmuch as it infringed the constitutional Commerce Clause, and extended the injunction against fines. The State Assembly amended the Act to comply with the concerns raised in the ruling, extended penalty deadline for another five years, and allowed use of diesel locomotives along with electric ones.

On July 1, 1926, when the lawsuit was still in progress, Mayor James Walker convened a conference of city and railroad executives. It resulted in a general agreement to remove surface tracks from West Side altogether. The Engineering Committee appointed at this conference presented their detailed plan in May 1927 and secured the approval of the State Assembly in 1928. In July 1929 the NYCRR finally agreed to cease steam traffic north of 72nd Street in two years time, and remove all tracks south of 60th Street, in five years. The 30th Street freight yards were allowed to stay. The project resulted in a new 13-mile-long (21 km) elevated structure, the $150 million High Line, which opened in 1934, was electrified with a third rail power supply, and was separated from street traffic. The elevated line passed directly through the warehouses, some of which contained sidings hidden from public view. The sidings were not electrified and were served by new tri-power switchers built by General Electric and ALCO. They could run on diesel, third rail, or battery power. The long-distance trains of the West Side Line were moved into a below-grade trench and tunnel west of 10th Avenue.

The city of Baltimore enacted a similar law, Ordinance 746–748, in June 1929.

== See also ==
- Railways Act 1921 (UK) that formed the Big Four British railway companies
