= Bipolar electric motor =

Electric motor with only two poles to its stationary field

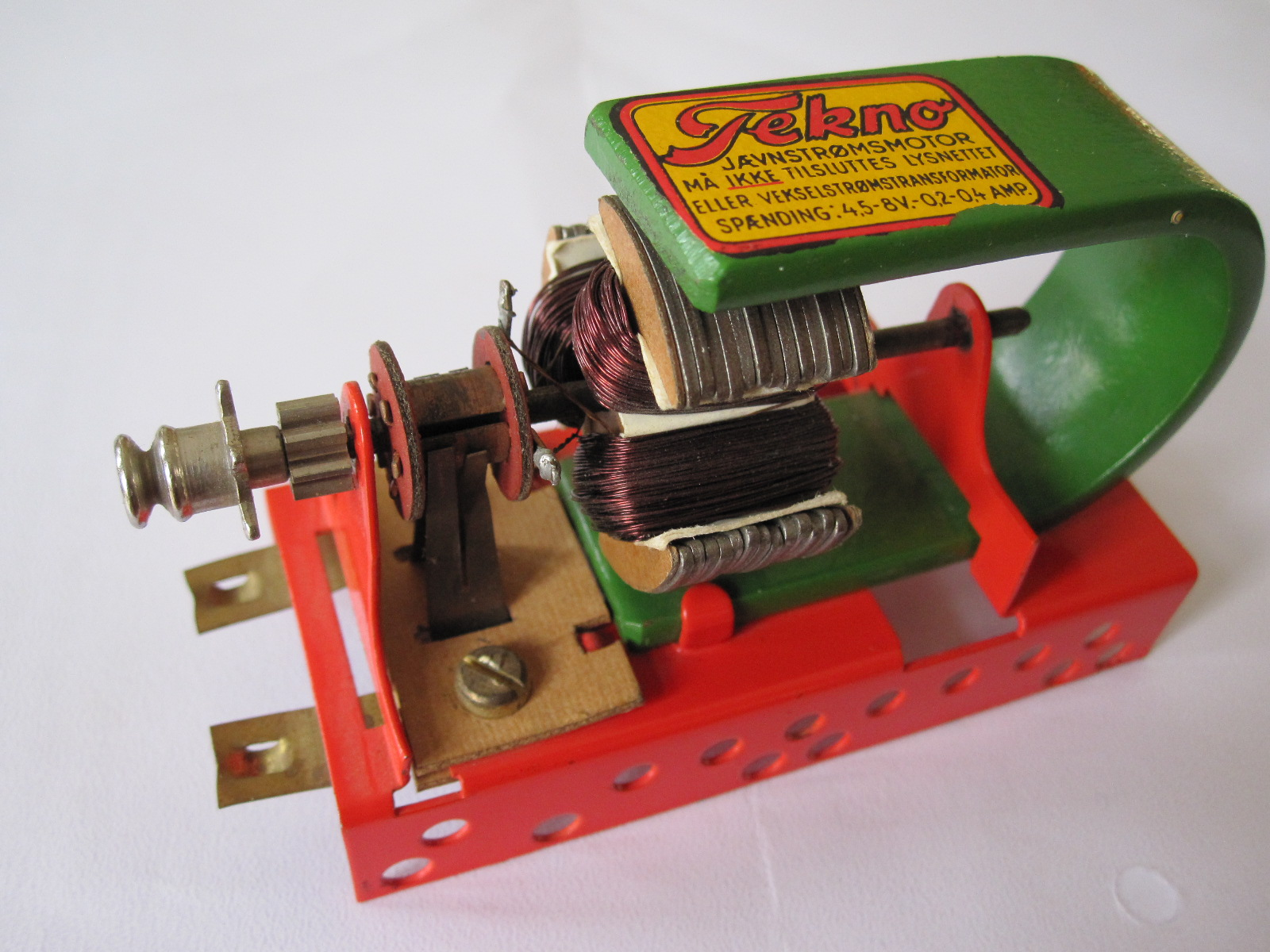
Bipolar toy motor of 1948. Note the three-pole rotor with a bipolar field

A bipolar electric motor is an electric motor with only two (hence bi-) poles to its stationary field. They are an example of the simple brushed DC motor, with a commutator. This field may be generated by either a permanent magnet or a field coil.

The 'bipolar' term refers to the stationary field of the motor, not the rotor. The rotors often have more than two poles, three for a simple motor and potentially more for a high-power motor. A two-pole rotor has the disadvantage that it is not self-starting in all positions and so requires to be flicked to start.

== Early motors ==
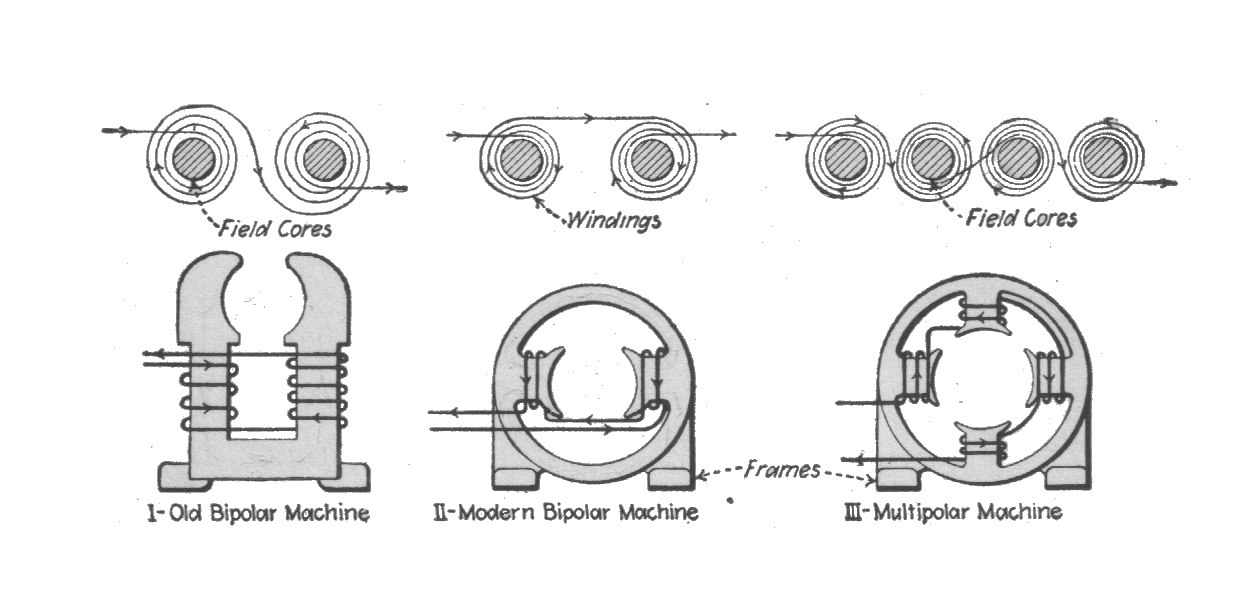
Early and late bipolar motors, and a four-pole motor

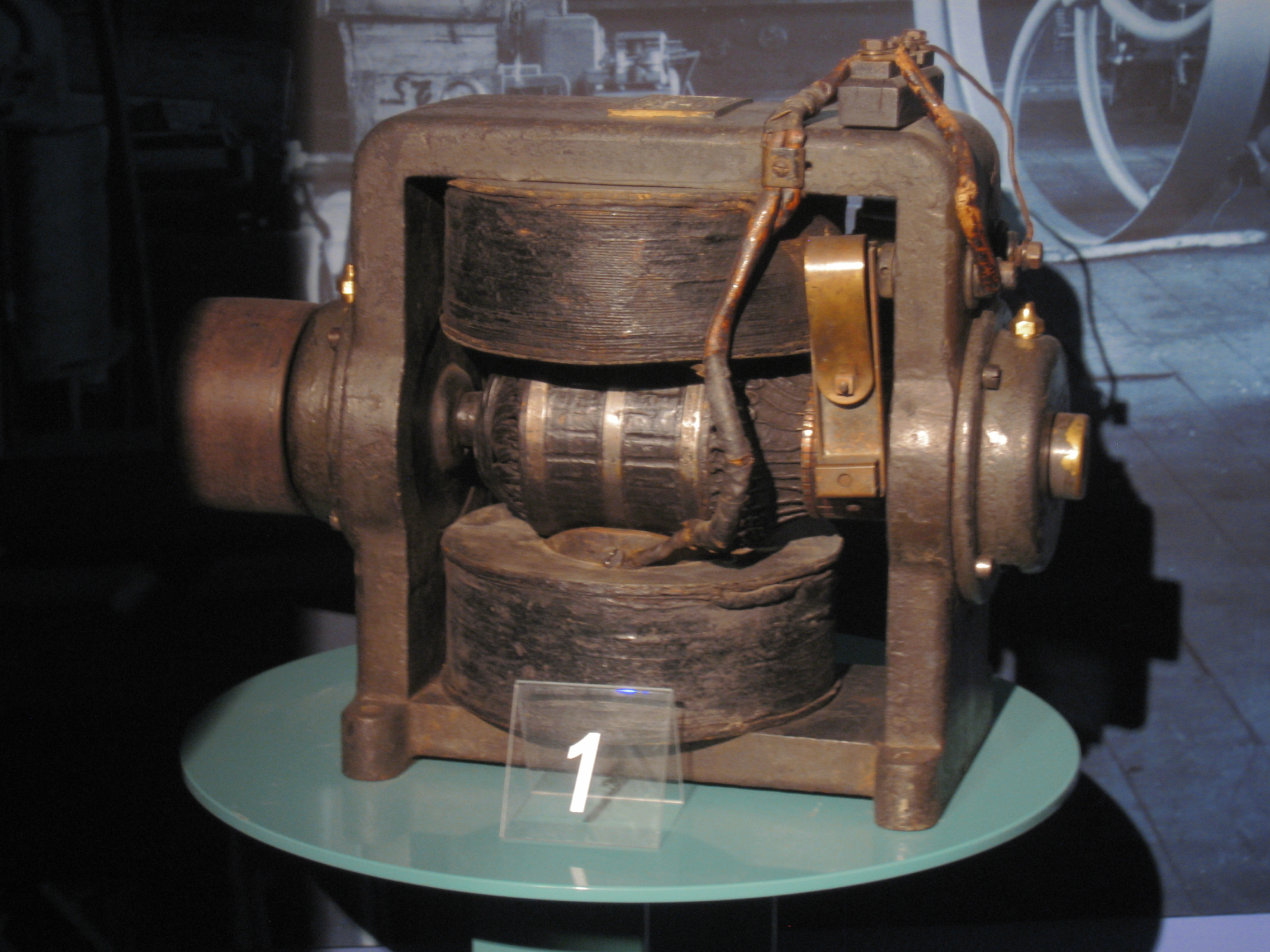
Early bipolar motor, with internal field coils, circa 1900

The first DC electrical motors, from the Gramme motor of the 1870s onwards, used bipolar fields. These early machines used crudely designed field pole pieces with long magnetic circuits, wide pole gaps and narrow pole pieces that gave only a limited flux through the armature. These fields were usually horseshoe-shaped, with either permanent horseshoe magnets or else either one or two field coils at some distance from the poles.

Early insulated wire was insulated, if at all, (Note: The first electromagnets were wound with bare copper wire, the only sort then available, and insulated with strips of cloth laid on the windings as they were wound.) with wrappings of cotton thread. These coils could only handle a low temperature rise before overheating and burning out with a short circuit. The coils were thus long and shallow, sometimes of only a single layer of wire, which required a long core simply to contain their size. Single small coils could be mounted horizontally, but the most common arrangement used two tall coils side by side.

To improve the efficiency of the magnetic circuit, it was realised that multiple magnetic paths could be provided through the same armature. The two coils were now separated and placed at the sides of the motor, with their iron core as a sideways figure-8 circuit and the armature in a central pole gap. Flux from both coils passed through this gap. This gave a magnetic circuit that was shorter overall and thus had fewer magnetic losses. The more compact coil windings were made possible by the use of shellac for impregnating the windings and improving the reliability of their insulation.

Later designs, from around 1900, became more compact with shorter, more efficient magnetic circuits. The field coils now moved into short, squat internal coils around the pole pieces themselves. The remainder of the magnetic circuit was a double-sided circular path around the casing of the motor. Whilst primarily designed to be more efficient, this also gave a far more compact layout in terms of space.

This circular layout also represented the end of the bipolar motor as an industrial power source. It was possible to place a second set of field coils and pole pieces within the same size of casing, giving a four-pole arrangement. Because of the more efficient provision of field flux around the entire circumference of the armature, this give a motor of almost twice the power, for the same armature current. Armature current, and the associated commutator and brushgear, represented one of the most expensive parts of the motor to manufacture.

== Electric railway locomotives ==
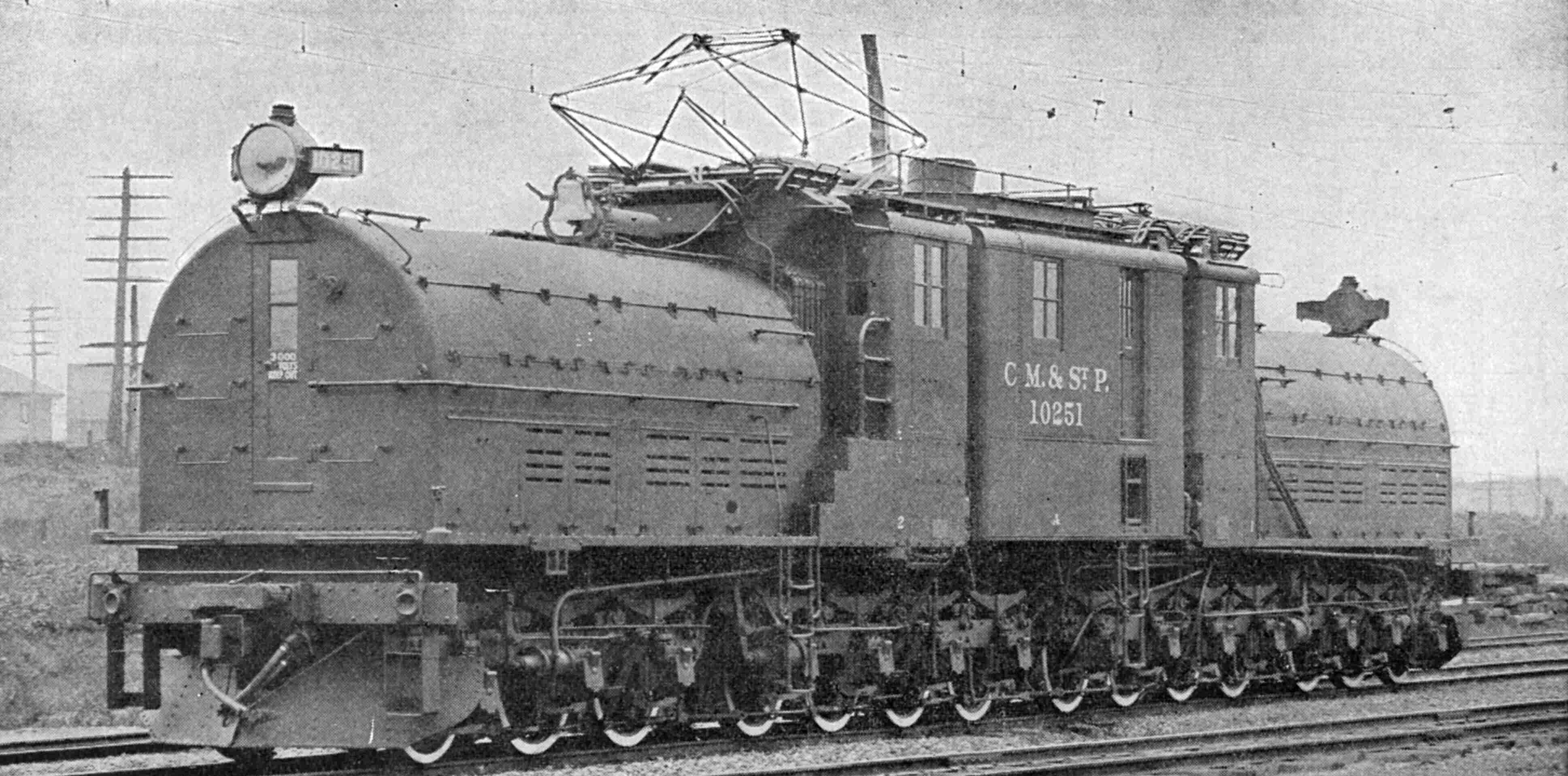
Milwaukee Road EP-2 "Bi-polar" locomotive

One of the last industrial uses for large bipolar motors was for the Milwaukee Road's class EP-2 electric locomotives of 1917. The line had chosen to electrify its Coast Division route, using a voltage of 3,000 V DC. These were not the first electric locomotives produced and incorporated lessons learned from previous practice. Many early locomotives had used one or two large motors mounted on the locomotive frame, with drive to the wheels by traditional steam locomotive practice of coupling rods. Where AC motors were used, requiring many poles and thus large diameters, these frame-mounted motors appeared inevitable even though they required this maintenance-intensive mechanical drive to the wheels. An alternative system of nose-hung traction motors used small high-speed motors alongside each axle, driving through a reduction gearbox. This system would eventually predominate across both electric and diesel locomotives, but at this time it was difficult to produce a reliable high-power gearbox.

The "bi-polar" design used axle-mounted motors, driving each wheel directly. The axle formed the spindle of not only the wheels, but also the motor armature itself. This obviously simple system had been used before, but only for low-powered locomotives with lightweight motors. As the wheels and axle, and in this case the motor too, are unsprung by the suspension, any extra weight here would lead to poor riding qualities. To permit its use for these extremely powerful new locomotives, the motor was split in two. The armature was formed as part of the axle, but the much heavier field poles and coils were carried on the suspended frame of the locomotive. This gave an acceptable ride.

The complexity of this system was that the armature must now be free to move up and down relative to the field, as the suspension moves. With a contemporary four-pole motor, this would vary the pole gap at the upper and lower poles, probably to the extent that the armature hit the pole pieces (suspension travel being far larger than typical pole gaps). The solution was to return to the relatively antiquated bipolar motor. By placing the poles at the side of the armature and giving them flat vertical faces, the armature was free to move up and down between them. The motor design was relatively inefficient, even by the standards of the day, but these locomotives were designed for their power and haulage capacity with a generous supply of cheap hydro-electricity, rather than designed for efficiency.

Early "bi-polar" designs included the New York Central's pioneering S-Motor of 1904 and later T-Motor of 1913, however the Milwaukee Road's class EP-2 became the class most associated with the bi-polar motor, even garnering the name "Bi-Polar" for the class.

The EP-2 locomotives operated reliably and successfully for 35 years. They were eventually withdrawn owing to a general decline in US railroads in the late 1950s, the advent of cheap diesel power, and in particular to a rebuilding of the class that was poorly carried out and left the rebuilt locomotives with reliability problems.

== Modern bipolar motors ==
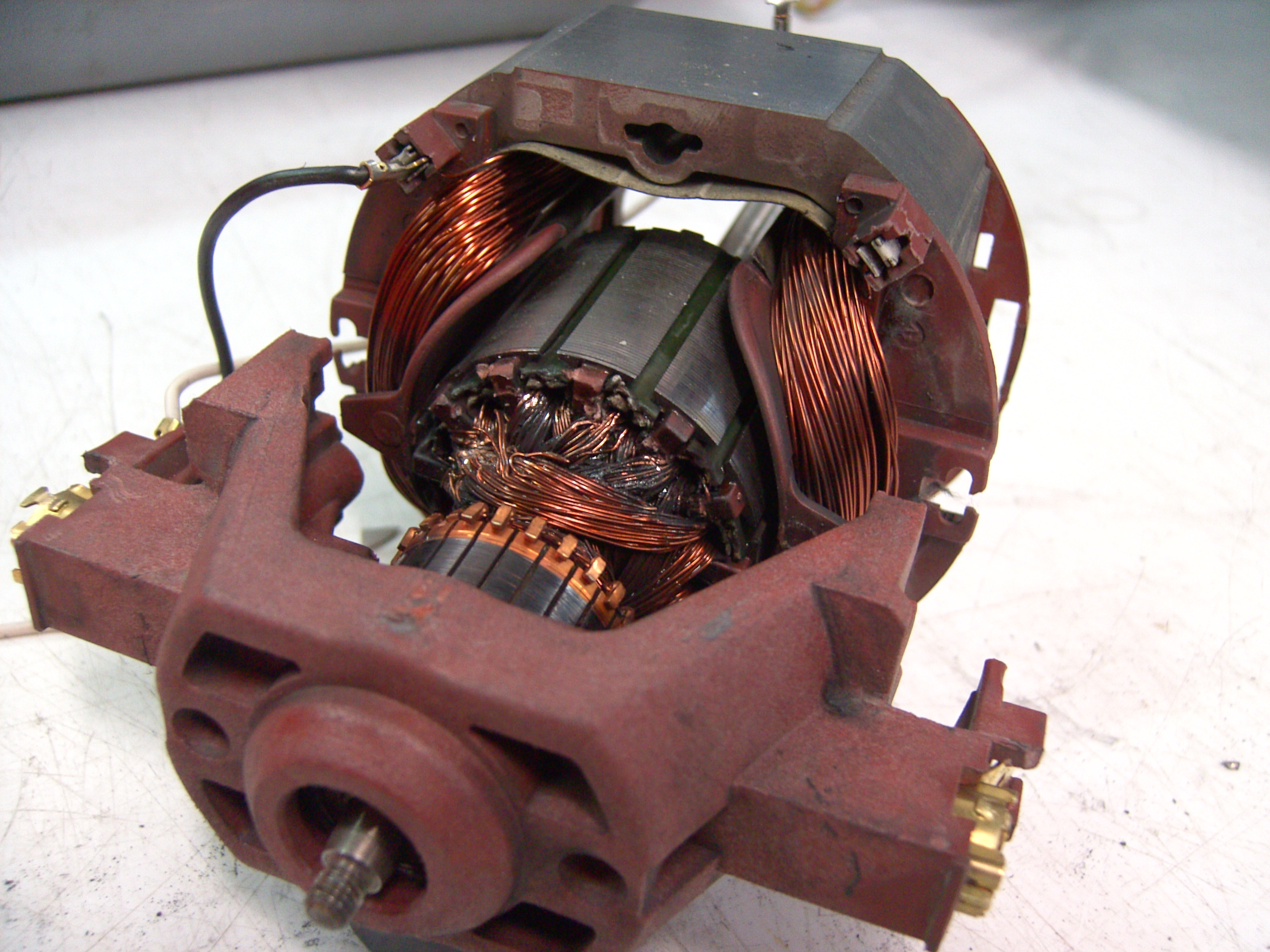
Modern cheap universal motor, from a vacuum cleaner

The bipolar motor is still in widespread use today, in medium-power, low-cost applications such as the universal motors used in home appliances such as food mixers, vacuum cleaners and electric drills.

These motors are broadly the design of the brushed DC motor with series-connected field windings. They also work well on AC supplies and are now most commonly found on such. They offer greater torque and speed than induction motors and so have many applications where their capital cost and light weight are more important than their electrical efficiency.

== Toy motors ==
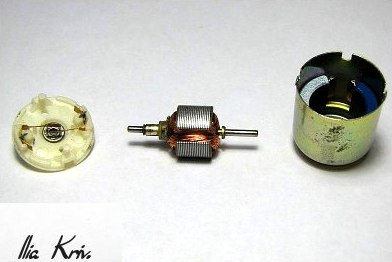
Modern 'can' motor disassembled. The field uses two crescent-shaped permanent magnets and the motor case.

The simple bipolar motor has been widely used in electric toys, since the early days of tinplate toys.

The first such motors used a simple horseshoe permanent magnet. More modern 'can' motors, from the 1960s onwards, have remained bipolar but have, like the industrial motors, used a more efficient pair of C-shaped magnets within a circular steel can case.

Owing to their additional cost and complexity, motors with field coils have only rarely been used for models. One well-known exception to this was the 'Taycol' range of motors, primarily aimed at larger model boats. These had their heyday in the 1950s and 1960s, becoming obsolete and uncompetitive in price as more powerful materials for permanent magnets, specifically ferrite, became available.

Taycol began with simple horseshoe magnet motors, but their real speciality was with wound fields. Most of these used a single transverse field coil mounted above the rotor. Their larger 'Marine' and 'Double Special' ranges used a dual-coil layout, with two vertical field coils mounted at the sides.

A similar, although smaller and far less powerful motor, was the Meccano E15R motor.

Construction of a simple bipolar motor, usually with a bipolar rotor as well, remains a popular basic science project for children.
