= Milwaukee Road class EP-2 =

1919 class of American electric locomotive

MILW EP-2
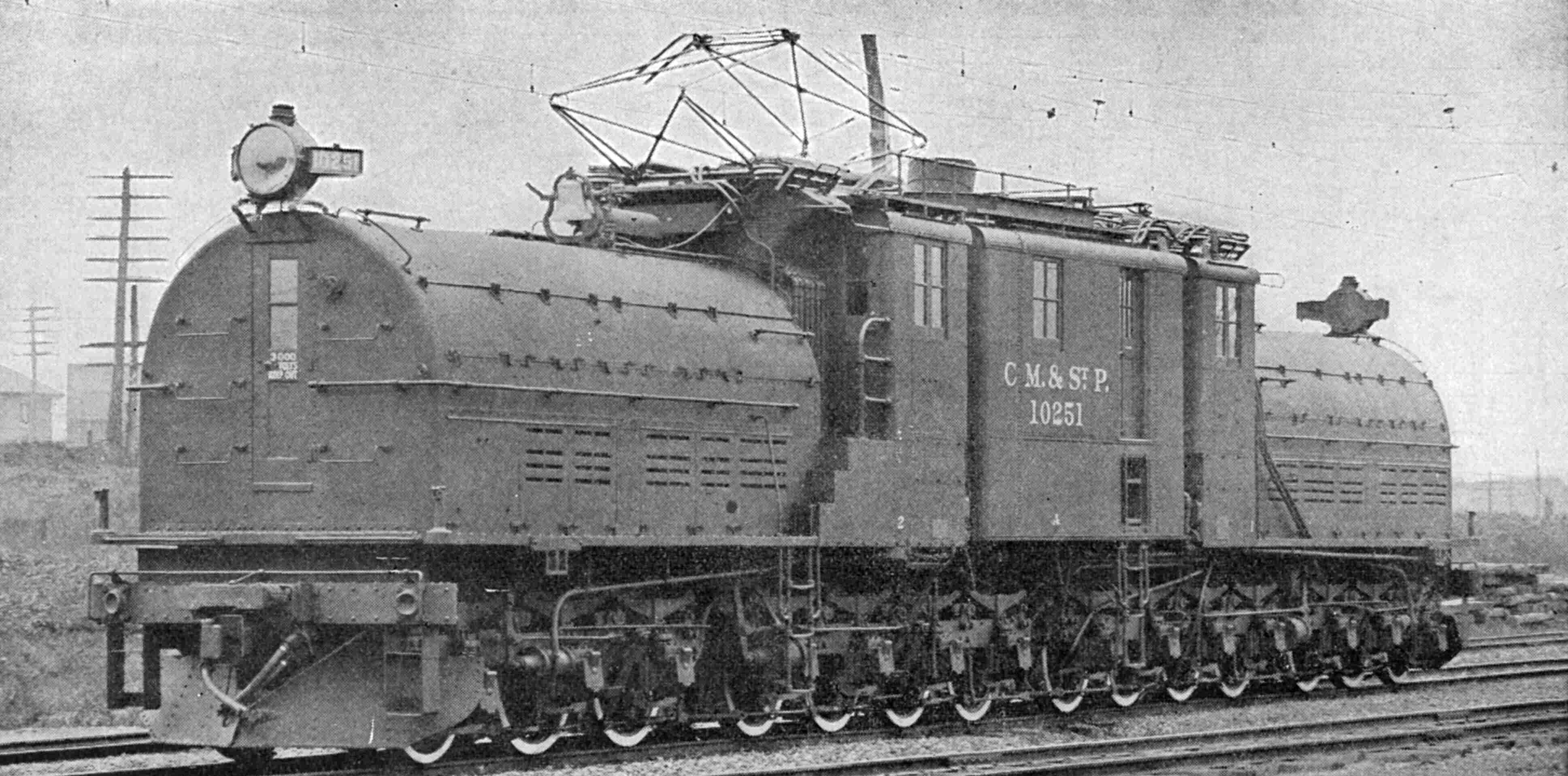
- Milwaukee Road class EP-2 'Bipolar'
Type and origin
- Power type: Electric
- Builder: General Electric
- Serial number: 6978–6982
- Build date: 1919, rebuilt 1953
- Total produced: 5
Specifications
- Configuration
  - Whyte: 2-4-8-0+0-8-4-2
  - AAR: 1B+D+D+B1
- Gauge: 4 ft 8 1/2 in (1,435 mm) standard gauge
- Leading dia.: 36 in (914 mm)
- Wheel diameter: 44 in (1,118 mm)
- Length: 76 ft 0 in (23.16 m) between coupler pulling faces
- Width: 10 ft 0 in (3.05 m)
- Height
  - Pantograph: 16 ft 8 in (5.08 m)
  - Body height: 14 ft 11 in (4.55 m)
- Axle load: 38,500 lb (17,500 kg; 17.5 t)
- Adhesive weight: 457,000 lb (207,000 kg; 207 t)
- Loco weight: 530,000 lb (240,000 kg; 240 t)
- Electric system/s: 3,000 V DC
- Current pickup: Dual pantograph
- Transmission: Twelve 370 hp (276 kW) gearless traction motors mounted directly on the axles
- Train heating: Steam generator
- Safety systems: Wabco E-2 air horn
Performance figures
- Maximum speed: 70 mph (113 km/h)
- Power output: 4,440 hp (3,311 kW)
- Tractive effort: 116,000 lbf (516 kN)
Career
- Operators: Milwaukee Road
- Class: EP-2
- Numbers: 10250–10254; renumbered E1–E5 in March 1939
- Locale: Northwest United States
- Retired: 1961
- Scrapped: 1962
- Disposition: One preserved on static display at the National Museum of Transportation in Kirkwood, Missouri; all others scrapped

The Milwaukee Road's class EP-2 comprised five electric locomotives built by General Electric in 1919. They were often known as Bipolars, which referred to the bipolar electric motors they used. Among the most distinctive and powerful electric locomotives of their time, they epitomized the modernization of the Milwaukee Road. They came to symbolize the railroad during their nearly 40 years of use, and remain an enduring image of mainline electrification.

== Design ==
In 1917, following the tremendous success of the 1915 electrification of the Mountain Division, the Milwaukee Road decided to proceed with electrifying the Coast Division. As part of this project it ordered five new electric locomotives from General Electric for $200,000 apiece, equal to $5,025,974 today. Their design was radically different from the boxcab locomotives previously provided by General Electric for the initial electrification of the Mountain Division two years earlier. The Milwaukee Road was the only railroad to order this design of locomotive from GE.

The most remarkable mechanical improvement was arguably the traction motors used on the new locomotives. They were known as bipolar motors, because each of the locomotive's 12 motors had only two field poles, mounted directly to the locomotive frame beside the axle. The motor armature was mounted directly on the axle, providing an entirely gearless design. This design was almost entirely noiseless, as it eliminated not only gear tooth growl, but also the whine of higher-RPM electric motors typically used in standard nose-mounted applications. The EP-2s were not the first electric locomotives to use bipolar motors, which had first been designed by Asa F. Batchelder for the New York Central S-motors over a decade earlier, but at the time they were the largest.

The layout of the Bipolars was unusual as well. The locomotive carbody consisted of three sections. A small center section contained a boiler for heating passenger cars, while the larger end sections contained the locomotive's electrical equipment in distinctive round-topped hoods as well as operator cabs. The locomotive's frame was split into four sections, hinged at the joints, with the two middle sections attached to the end sections of the locomotive body. There were twelve sets of driving wheels, plus a single idler axle at each end, for a 1B+D+D+B1 wheel arrangement. All buffering forces were transmitted through the locomotive frame.

The Bipolars were designed to be able to pull any Milwaukee Road passenger train singly and were originally delivered without multiple unit controls. General Electric claimed a top speed of 90 mph (145 km/h) for the locomotives, but the Milwaukee Road rated them at 70 mph (113 km/h). They were rated at continuous 3,180 horsepower (2.37 MW) with a continuous tractive effort of 42,000 lbf (190 kN) and a starting tractive effort of 116,000 lbf (520 kN).

== Service history ==
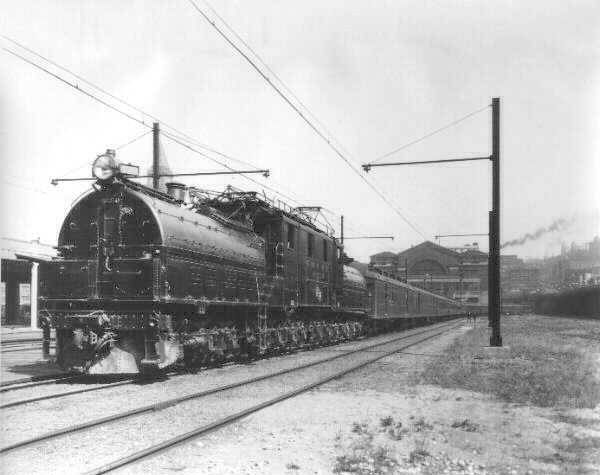
Milwaukee Road EP-2 "Bipolar" leaving Seattle, 1925.

When the Bipolars were introduced, their modernity and distinctive design made them the most famous of the Milwaukee Road's electric locomotives. They came to symbolize the Olympian, the railroad's premier train from Chicago to Seattle. Their unique appearance and power made them ideal for publicity purposes, and there was a series of demonstrations in which a Bipolar was able to out-pull contemporary steam locomotives. During a short period of testing on the Mountain Division, the EP-2s were shown to be less expensive to operate than the GE and Westinghouse electric locomotives then in use.

The five EP-2s, numbered 10250-10254, were placed into regular service in 1919 on the Coast Division. The Milwaukee Road saw immediate cost savings over the steam locomotives previously in use, as the Bipolars could run from Tacoma to Othello without stopping for servicing and could haul trains up grades that had required double-heading steam engines.

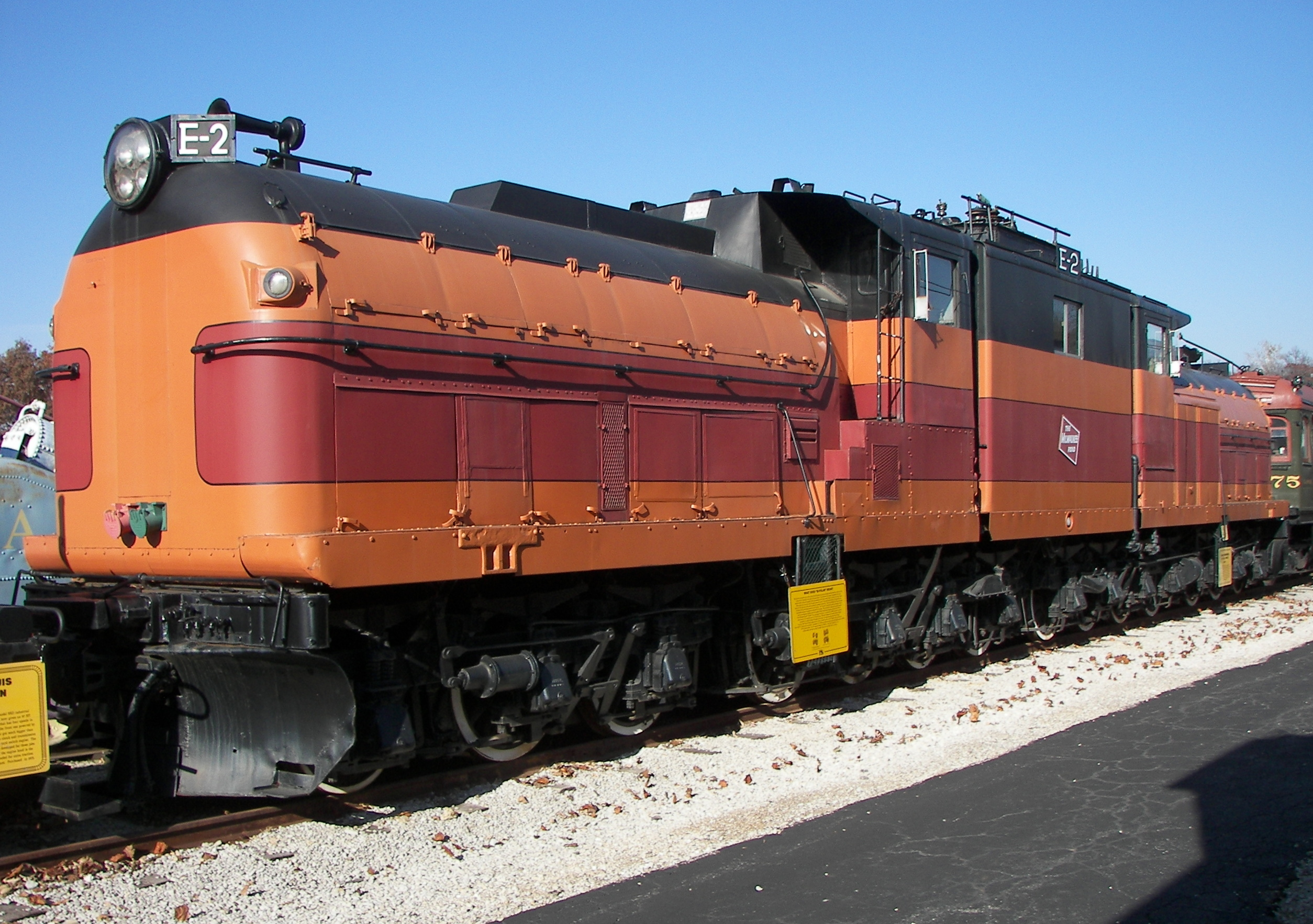
E-2 on display in 2008

The Bipolars operated on the Coast Division from 1919 to 1953, for most of that period without any serious rebuilding. In 1939 they were renumbered E1-E5. In 1953 all five of the EP-2s, which were 35 years old and worn out from heavy wartime service, were heavily rebuilt by the Milwaukee Road at a cost of about $40,000 per locomotive, equal to $481,343 today. The rebuild included additional traction motor shunts for increased speed, roller bearings, multiple unit capability, flash boilers, and streamlining. The E5, rebuilt in the Tacoma Shops as the prototype, performed as advertised, but went over budget, so the Milwaukee Shops were tasked with rebuilding the other four Bipolars. Unfortunately the Milwaukee Shop forces, unaccustomed to working on electric locomotives, did a "poor job" in the opinion of Electrification Department Head Laurence Wylie. (Wylie's successor, T. B. Kirk, stated that he saw a group of disconnected wires in a newly rebuilt EP-2 bundled together and tagged with a written message, "We don't know where these go".) Afterwards the Bipolars were prone to electrical fires and failures, despite repeated attempts by Tacoma Shops to correct them.

The Bipolars saw decreased use between 1954 and 1957, and in mid-1957 were transferred off the Coast Division to the Mountain Division. Their problems persisted; moreover, passenger train speeds in the Rockies (over 80 miles per hour or 129 km/h in some locations) were generally in excess of the Coast's top speed of 60–65 mph (97–105 km/h), further exacerbating these problems. Between 1958 and 1960 all five were gradually retired, by which time they had received the Union Pacific-inspired yellow and gray passenger paint scheme. In 1962 all except for one E2 were towed to Seattle and scrapped. Locomotive E2 was donated to the National Museum of Transportation in St. Louis, Missouri in 1962 and moved there that year. It has remained on static display ever since, and has been fully restored to its appearance immediately after its 1953 rebuilding.

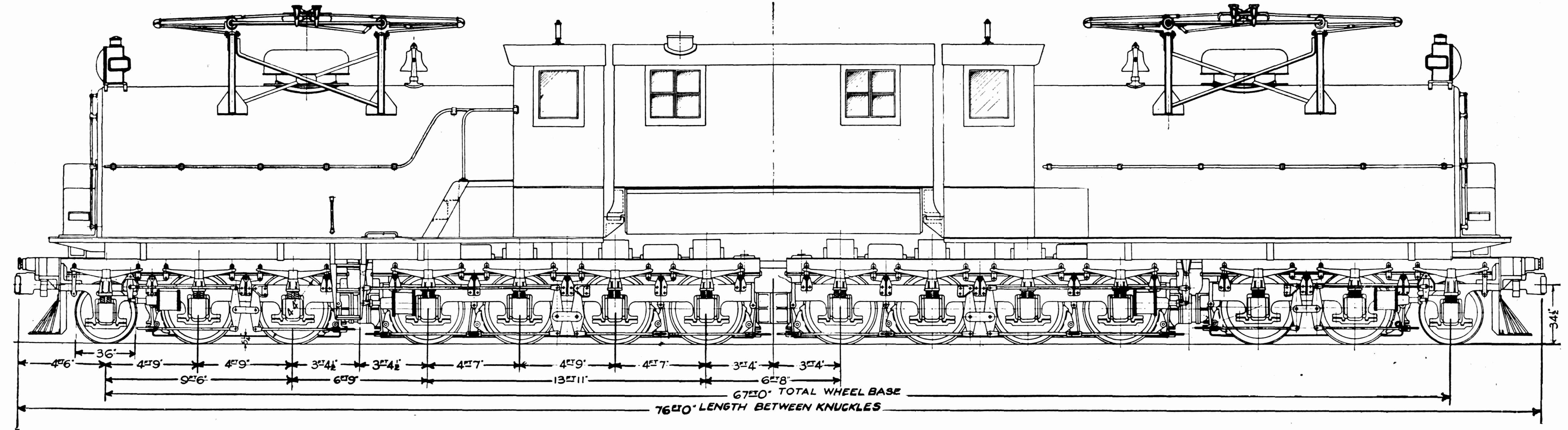
Side-view drawing with dimensions.
