= New York Central S-Motor =

Series of classes of American Electric locomotives

NYC S Motor
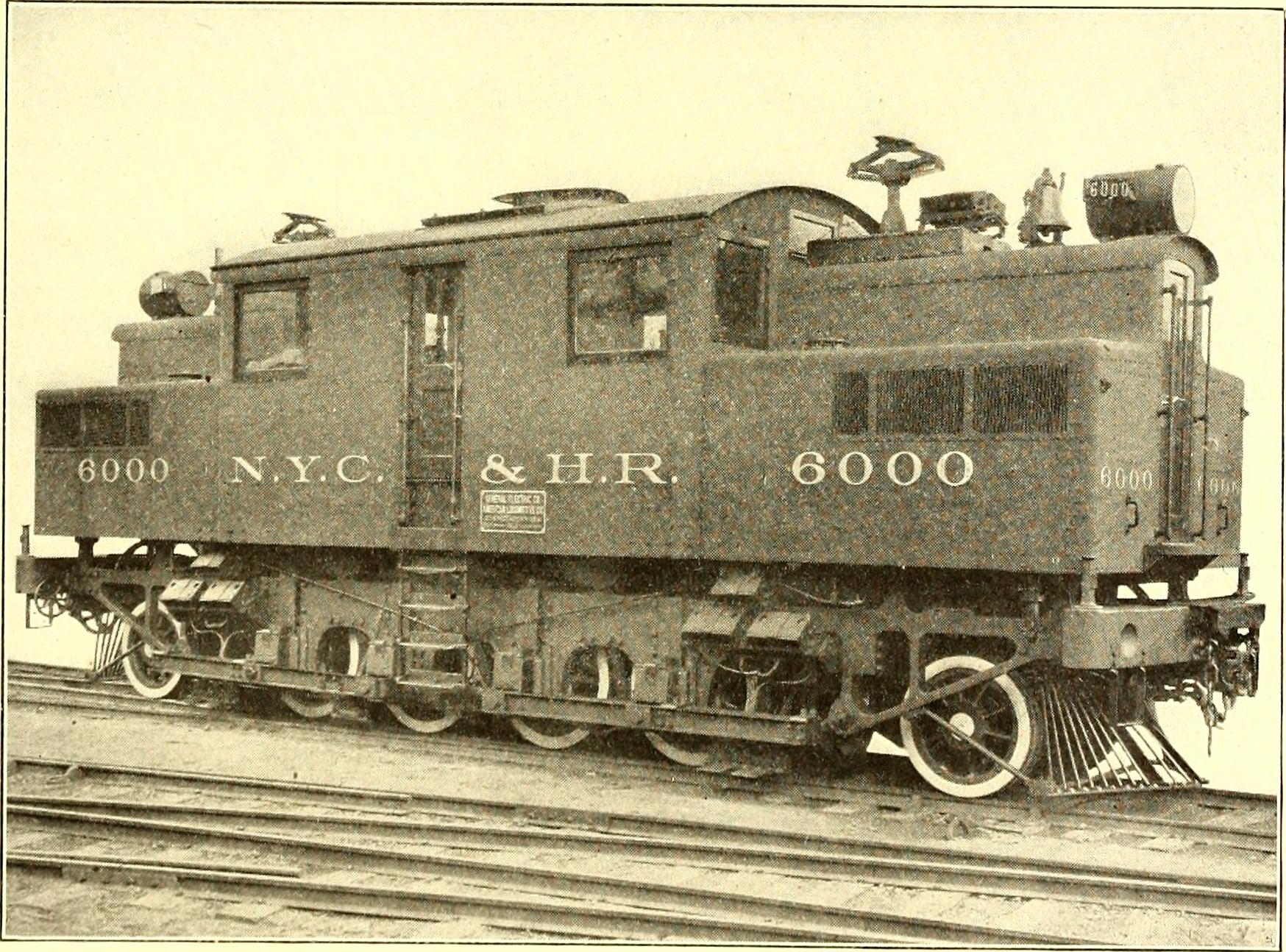
- Prototype S-1 class #6000 (later #100)
Type and origin
- Power type: Electric
- Builder: ALCO-GE
- Build date: 1904-1909
- Total produced: S-1: 1 S-2: 32; S-2a: 2 S-3: 12; Total: 47
Specifications
- Configuration
  - Whyte: 2-8-2RE; 4-8-4RE
  - AAR: 1-D-1; 2-D-2
  - UIC: 1′Do1′ 2′Do2′
- Gauge: 4 ft 8 1/2 in (1,435 mm) standard gauge
- Leading dia.: 36 in (914 mm)
- Driver dia.: 44 in (1,118 mm)
- Length: S-1, S-2: 39 ft 0 in (11.89 m); S-2a: 37 ft 0 in (11.28 m); S-3: 43 ft 2 in (13.16 m)
- Adhesive weight: S-1, S-2: 148,000 lb (67,130 kg); S-2a: 140,000 lb (63,500 kg); S-3: 150,000 lb (68,040 kg)
- Loco weight: S-1, S-2: 228,000 lb (103,400 kg); S-2a: 224,000 lb (101,600 kg); S-3: 242,000 lb (109,800 kg)
- Electric system/s: 660 V DC third rail
- Current pickup: Contact shoe
- Traction motors: 4 × GE 84 550 hp (410 kW)
- Transmission: Resistance controlled DC current supplied to gearless DC traction motors mounted directly on the axles.
Performance figures
- Maximum speed: 60 mph (97 km/h)
- Power output: 2,200 hp (1,600 kW) Starting; 1,695 hp (1,264 kW) Continuous
- Tractive effort: 37,000 lbf (160 kN)
Career
- Disposition: 3 preserved, remainder scrapped

S-Motor was the class designation given by the New York Central to its ALCO-GE built S-1, S-2, S-2a and S-3 electric locomotives. The S-Motors hold the distinction of being the world's first mass-produced main line electric locomotives with the prototype #6000 being constructed in 1904. The S-Motors would serve alone until the more powerful T-motors began to arrive in 1913, eventually displacing them from main line passenger duties. From that point the class was assigned to shorter commuter trains and deadhead rolling stock between Grand Central Terminal and Mott Haven coach yard. Some examples, including the prototype later renumbered #100, would serve in this capacity through the Penn Central merger in 1968, only being retired in the 1970s as long distance passenger traffic to Grand Central dried up.

== History ==
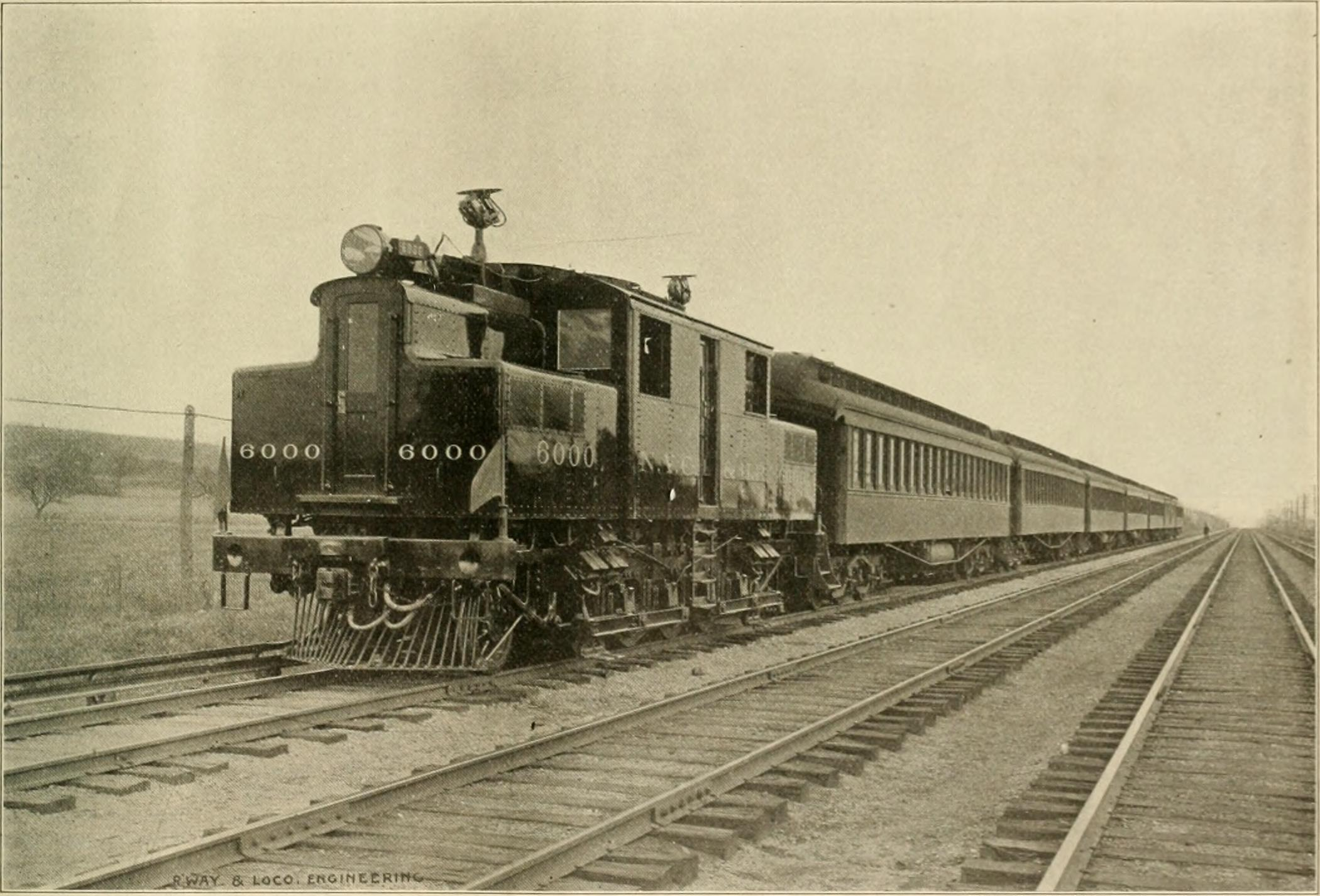
Unit 6000 hauling a train with various railway officials, 1904

After a disastrous 1902 accident in the Park Avenue Tunnel the New York legislature passed a law banning steam locomotives within the city limits effective in 1908. Seeing an opportunity, the railroad decided this could mean a chance to completely rebuild its congested Midtown Manhattan stub end terminal and yard facilities. The electrification project would see not only the construction of the Grand Central Terminal itself, but miles of completely underground platforms and yard tracks which would not have been possible with exhaust-producing steam locomotives.

Having already found success with the world's first main line electrification project in Baltimore in 1895, ALCO and General Electric were tasked with designing a new locomotive for the project with Alco building the engine and GE supplying the electrical equipment. The initial prototype locomotive, delivered as Class L #6000, was in the 1-D-1 configuration with 4 gearless "bi-polar" type traction motors which used the axle shaft as the motor armature. Between October 1904 and July 1906 #6000 racked up 50,000 miles (80,000 km) in test on a track near both Alco and GE plants in Schenectady, New York.

The advantages of the new locomotive were striking. It was only half the length of a standard steam locomotive with tender and weighed only two thirds as much, but could provide more power, especially when starting trains on steep grades. It was capable of rapid acceleration and deceleration, ideal for the Hudson and Harlem lines’ numerous, closely spaced commuter rail stations. The locomotive required no turntable and could be reversed for service in the opposite direction in a matter of seconds. With the tests complete an order was placed for 34 additional locomotives to be delivered in the 3400 series and classed T-2 with the original being re-classed T-1.

Unfortunately, two days into the new electric service in 1907 a train led by two T-2 class locomotives number 3407 and 3421 derailed on a curve on the Harlem Line killing 24 and injuring 140. The investigation identified design flaws involving the long rigid wheelbase and its performance at high speed. The solution was to convert the entire class to use 2 axle leading and trailing trucks to better guide the locomotive around curves. Units already delivered were modified to fit the extra wheels and units not delivered were modified in the factory. Again the class was changed from T to S. Finally in 1908 an additional batch of 12 locomotives, class S-3, were ordered to support the electrification being extended to North White Plains on the Harlem Line.

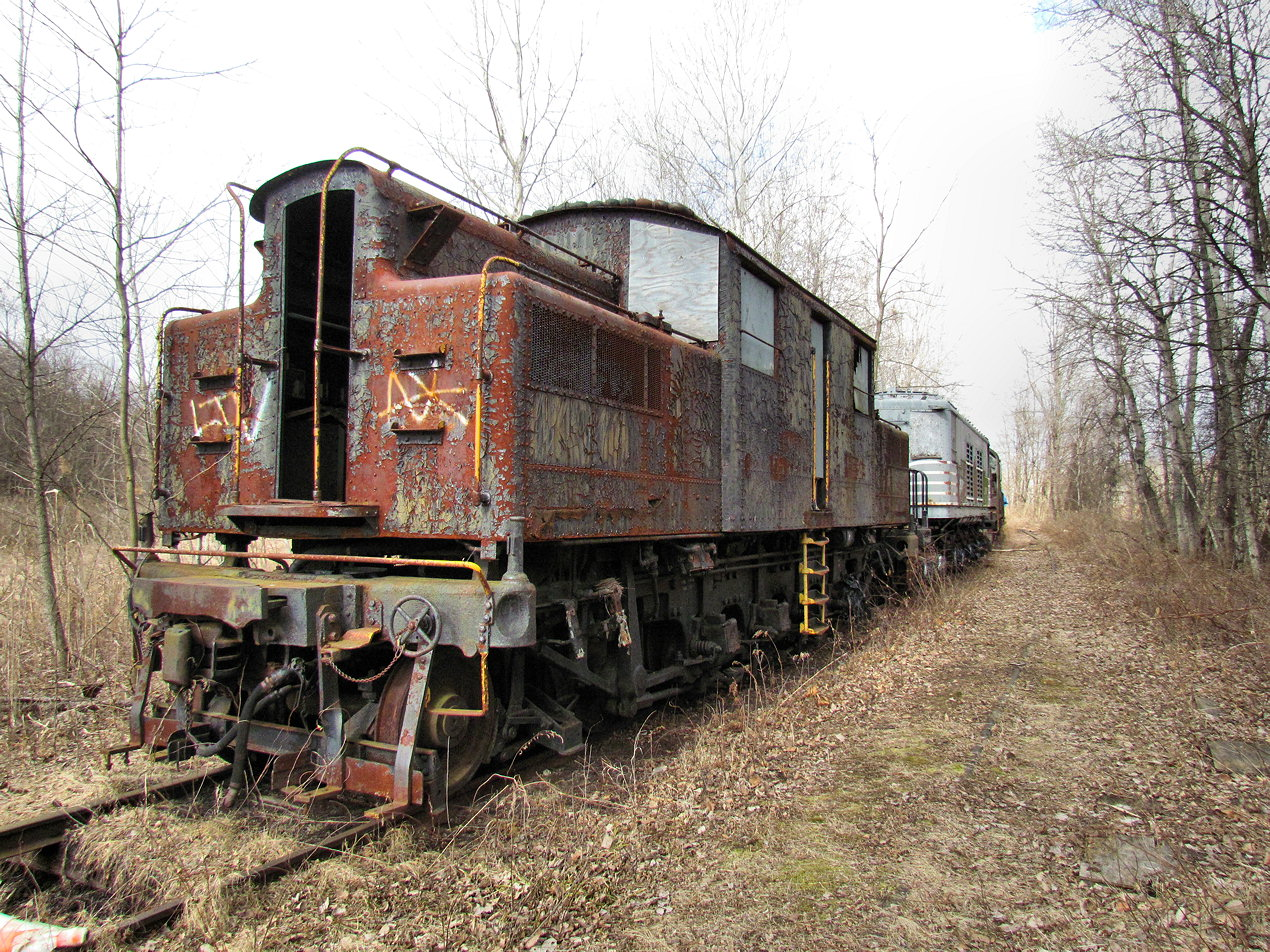
The original S-Motor, former No. 6000, awaiting restoration south of Albany, NY in 2012.

With weight split between powered and unpowered axles the S motors were never completely satisfactory at pulling long heavy trains at high speed. The 1907 accident only made matters worse with additional unpowered axles being added and new speed restrictions imposed. Finally in 1913 the new class of T-Motors arrived, displacing the S Motors from first line service. For the next 60 years the S-motors were assigned to short local commuter trains and empty equipment movements between Grand Central and the Coach Yards at Mott Haven. They were later re-numbered into the 1100 series and ultimately the 100 series with some examples surviving the Penn Central merger. The combination of the New Haven's new 60 unit strong electro-diesel FL-9 to handle short commuter trains and the drastic reduction in long distance passenger trains using the Mott Haven coach yards eventually ended these niche applications as well. Their final assignment was switching service in the underground yards of Grand Central Terminal. The last S motor, #115, was finally retired from Conrail commuter operations in 1981 after 75 years in service, being replaced by GE E-10 steeplecab units acquired second hand from the Niagara Junction Railroad after Conrail took control of that operation.

Three S-Motors were preserved including the prototype #100. Two are in museums, #113 at the National Museum of Transportation, and #115 at the Illinois Railway Museum; however, #100, owned by the Mohawk and Hudson chapter NRHS, was stored outside for 36 years on an abandoned rail spur in Glenmont, New York awaiting funds for restoration. As of January 2024, the locomotive is located at the Danbury Railway Museum in Danbury, Connecticut.
