= Hancock air whistle =

Railroad whistle

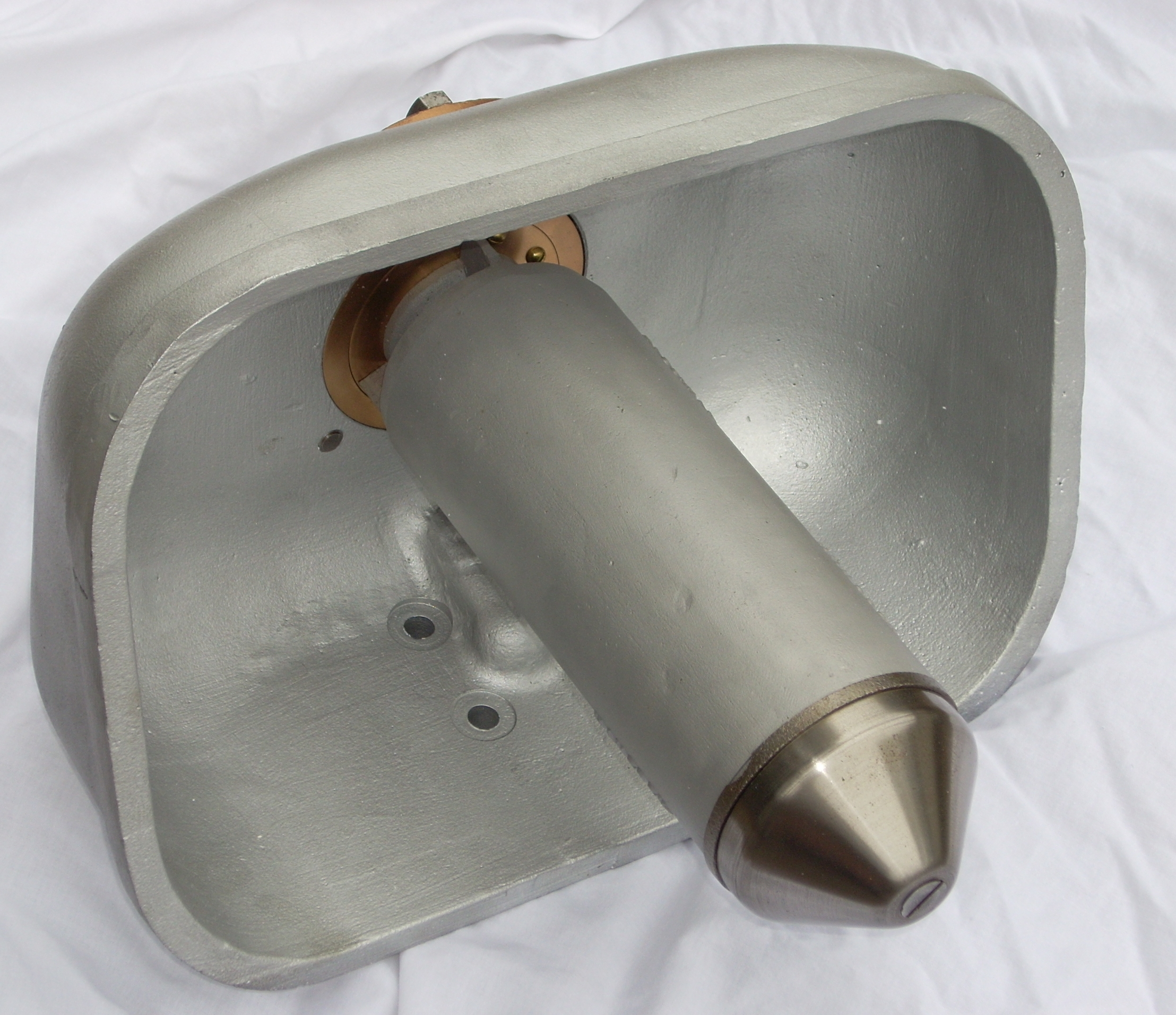
Hancock model 4700 air whistle intended for use on diesel locomotives

The Hancock air whistle was a railroad whistle intended for use on North American diesel locomotives in place of the standard air horn. It was manufactured by the Hancock Valve Division of Manning, Maxwell and Moore.

== History ==
=== Steam era ===
Hancock was well known to the railroads during the days of steam. The company produced many appliances, one of which was the popular long-bell three-chime steam whistle.

When railroads began dieselizing, Hancock, along with other manufacturers of railroad equipment, adjusted their offerings in order to remain competitive. And so Hancock modified their whistle design so they could be used on diesel locomotives.

=== Diesel era ===
Hancock already had vast experience with steam whistles, and practically none with air horns. Also, diesel locomotives were an emerging technology, and most early models were equipped with single-note 'honkers'. These horns were anything but appealing to the general public. Therefore, Hancock developed their line of air whistles in an attempt to romanticize the diesel locomotives. Production of these air whistles spanned from the late 1950s until the late 1960s.

=== Users ===
The New York, New Haven and Hartford Railroad was the largest user of these whistles, and every FL9 purchased by the New Haven came from the factory equipped with a Hancock 4700 air whistle on the roof in the front, and an H4700 whistle (no reflector dish) on the rear. Additionally, the NH's 40 Budd RDCs had two Hancock 4700 whistles, plus their Mack FCD-1 & FCD-2 railbuses, 30 GP9s, 15 RS-11s, 15 H-16-44s, 20 SW1200s & their fleet of Pullman-Westinghouse stainless steel MUs. One DL-109 was also retrofitted with a pair.

Other railroads occasionally used them, notably the New York Central on some RS-3s, the Seaboard Air Line on their SDP-35s, the Cambria & Indiana on its SW9s, and the Minneapolis, Northfield & Southern.

Unfortunately, it was found that at high speeds, the whistles were difficult to hear. Class I railroads eventually replaced their Hancock whistles with horns, namely for safety reasons. Short line users were generally steel mill railroads, where it was found that the whistle was easier to hear than a horn within the mill.

== Types of air whistles ==
Hancock offered three different models of their air whistle. The most common was the 4700, which consisted of the whistle along with a large, rectangular bowl in the same plane as the languid plate. This bowl, or reflector, is used to project the sound of the whistle ahead of the locomotive, instead of omnidirectional as in the case of most whistles. The second model was the 4700–2. This whistle is basically the same as the 4700 except that it has an electric heating element installed in the bowl to keep it from freezing. The final offering was the H4700, which did not include the reflector bowl. Aside from this difference, it is basically identical to the 4700.

The Hancock air whistles were all designed so that the bell of the whistle is horizontal when mounted on a standard horn mount. All the whistles are a single-bell chime, playing the notes E A C♯ (A major triad) when blown on air. However, over time, many of the whistles got off-key and produced some variants.

== See also ==
- Steam whistle

== Audio samples ==
- Hancock 4700 air whistle
