= Train whistle =

Audible signaling device on a steam locomotive

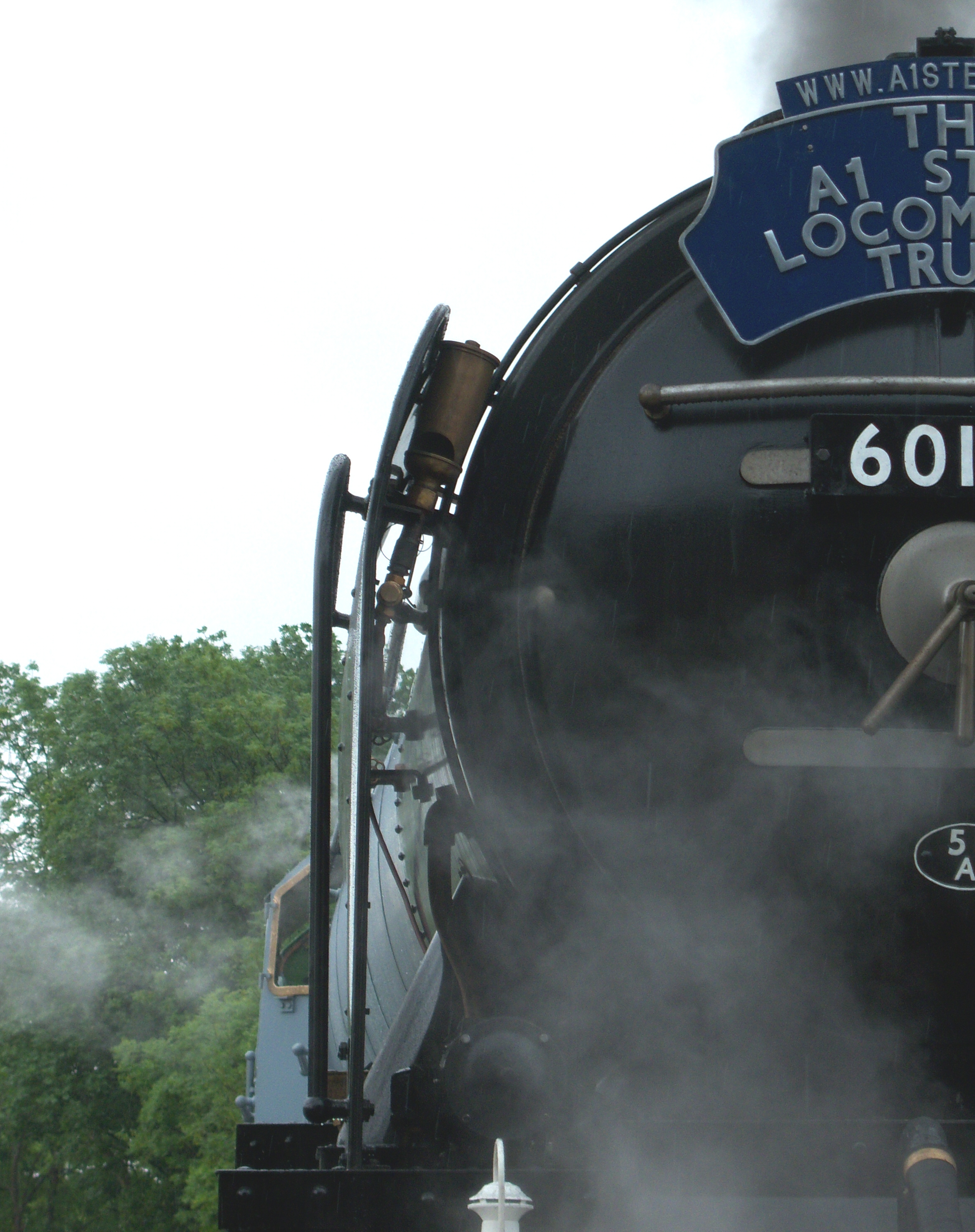
One of two (front and rear) whistles on steam locomotive 60163 Tornado

A train whistle or air whistle (originally referred to as a train trumpet or air trumpet) is an audible signaling device on a railway locomotive, used to warn that the train is approaching, and to communicate with rail workers. Steam whistles were commonly used on steam locomotives, and were replaced with air horns on diesel and electric locomotives. However, the word whistle continues to be used by railroaders in referring to such signaling practices as "whistling off" (sounding the horn when a train gets underway).

The need for a whistle on a locomotive exists because trains move on fixed rails and thus are uniquely susceptible to collision. This susceptibility is exacerbated by a train's enormous weight and inertia, which make it difficult to quickly stop when encountering an obstacle. Hence a means of warning others of the approach of a train from a distance is necessary. As train whistles are inexpensive compared to other warning devices, the use of loud and distinct whistles became the preferred solution for railway operators.

Steam whistles were almost always actuated with a pull cord (or sometimes a lever) that permitted proportional (tracker) action, so that some form of "expression" could be put into the sound. Many locomotive operators would have their own style of blowing the whistle, known as "quilling", and it was often apparent who was operating the locomotive by the sound. Modern locomotives often make use of a push button switch to operate the air horn, eliminating any possibility of altering the horn's volume or pitch.

== North American usage ==
North American steam locomotive whistles have different sounds from one another. They come in many forms, from tiny little single-note shriekers to larger plain whistles with deeper tones (a deep, plain train whistle is the "hooter" of the Norfolk & Western, used on their A- and Y-class Mallet locomotives). Even more well known were the multi-chime train whistles. Nathan of New York copied and improved Casey Jones's boiler-tube chime whistle by casting the six chambers into a single bell, with open "steps" on top to save on casting.

Another very popular American train whistle was, again, a Nathan product. This was a five-note whistle, with a much shorter bell, and therefore, much higher in pitch. This whistle produced a bright G-major 6th chord (GBDEG) and, again, was heavily imitated, copies being made by many different railroads.

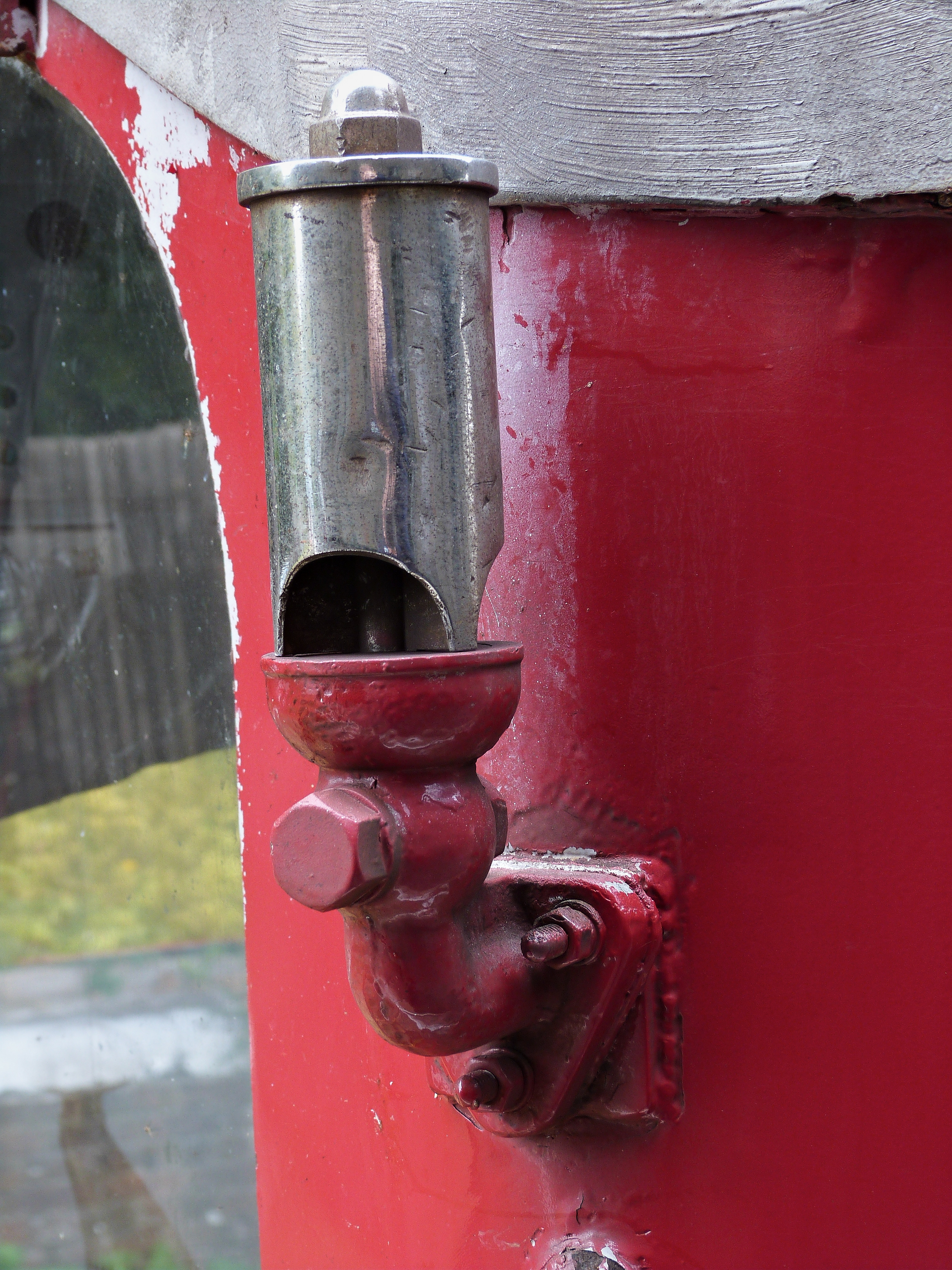
An air whistle mounted on a British Rail Class 483 EMU working on the Island Line. The whistles on the Class 483s were used by the previous Class 485 and 486 units and even the Class 71 locomotives and were fitted to the Class 483 units when the trains were rebuilt from 1938 tube stock in 1989.

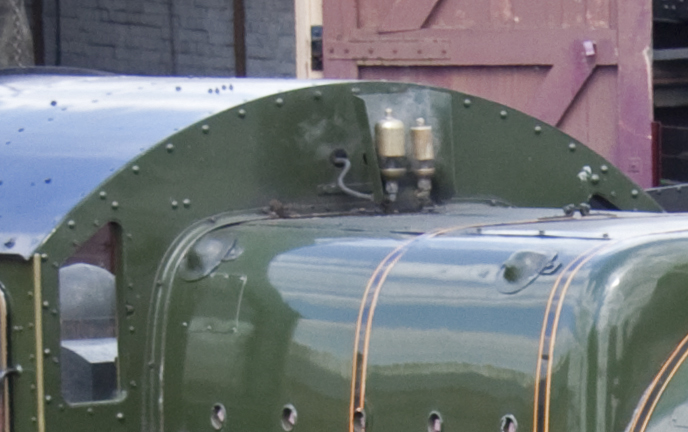
GWR twin whistles, seen on 7827 Lydham Manor

== Noise complaints from train whistles ==
It is not uncommon for the sound of a train's whistle to propagate for miles; yet vehicle operators still have a difficult time hearing the warning signal due to the vehicle's soundproofing and ambient noise within the cab (such as engine, road, radio, and conversation noises).

The need to blare a train's whistle loudly to be heard by the driver of a vehicle approaching a grade crossing has become a major disadvantage to the use of train whistles as a safety device and has caused much controversy among those living within earshot of the train's whistle. It has been documented that a train's whistle, when operating on compressed air, driving an exponential horn, has been measured at a higher decibel levels within the homes of nearby residents than within the cab of a vehicle sitting at the grade crossing.

Given the tonal design of the train whistle, the sound level, how often trains pass through a given community, the number of grade crossings in proximity, and the time of day (night) of occurrence, community residents residing near crossing sometimes feel that train whistles have a serious detrimental effect on the quality of life despite the gain in safety that sounding the horn provides to motorists and pedestrians. However, one Federal Railroad Administration study has shown that the frequency of grade crossing accidents increases in areas where quiet zones are in effect. The study fails to account for other factors that were also introduced at the same time which may have also accounted for the reduction in accidents during the same period the study measured. For instance, it was during the same period that locomotives began sporting the now crucially important tri-lamp headlight arrangement ("ditch lights") and reflector strips similar to those commonly found on highway tractor-trailers. Additionally, the measurements were based on accidents at grade-crossings, which are very low numbers overall to begin with. A grade-crossing that had two accidents during the comparison years, when contrasted with only one accident during the control period, would statistically yield a high percentage-wise improvement in safety, when in reality, it was the difference in only one accident for that grade-crossing.

Conversely, there are those who do not object to the train whistle, as they believe it provides an important safety feature. Some people even like the sound of the whistle, as it calls to mind a nostalgic era, as with the riverboats and their steam whistles and calliopes. However, no real studies have been performed by unbiased official entities to measure the real effects such noise has on a community.

=== Quiet zones ===
Quiet zones are created in municipalities where citizens of the community complain of the noise pollution from the increasing number of trains which decreases their quality of life. In order to be approved for quiet zones, extensive safety and traffic studies must be conducted. Municipalities and the owners of the tracks must work together to ensure all federal regulations are being met. Quiet zones require improvements which would include installing standard or conventional automatic warning devices such as gates with lights if not already installed. Medians must be installed at the railroad crossings to ensure vehicles do not proceed into the opposite lane to go around the gates. Once all safety measures are completed train whistles will be silenced at the railroad crossings.

== Whistle code ==
Train whistles are used to communicate with other railroad workers on a train or in the yard. Specific combinations of long and short whistles have specific meanings. They are used to pass instructions, as a safety signal, and to warn of impending movements of a train. Despite the advent of modern radio communication, many of these whistle signals are still used today. (See also Train horn § Common horn signals.)

Signals below are American practice: ▄ represents short sounds, and ▄▄▄ for longer ones.

Sequence	Meaning
▄ ▄	Acknowledgment of any signal not otherwise provided for
▄ ▄ ▄	When train is stopped: backing up, or acknowledgment of a hand signal to back up; when moving: stop at next station
▄ ▄ ▄ ▄	Request for a signal to be given, or repeated if not understood
▄▄▄	When train is stopped: air brakes are applied and pressure is equalized
▄▄▄ ▄▄▄	Train releases brakes and proceeds
▄▄▄ ▄▄▄ ▄▄▄ ▄▄▄	Flagman return from the west or south
▄▄▄ ▄▄▄ ▄▄▄ ▄▄▄ ▄▄▄	Flagman return from the east or north
▄▄▄ ▄	Inspect the brake system for leaks or sticking brakes
▄▄▄ ▄ ▄	Warning that a second section of a timetabled train is following
▄▄▄ ▄ ▄ ▄	Instruction for flagman to protect rear of train
▄▄▄ ▄▄▄ ▄ ▄▄▄▄	Train is approaching public grade crossing(s), known as Rule 14L in almost all railroad operating rules; also used in Australia
Series of short blasts	An emergency exists, or if persons or livestock are on the track

Not all railroads use exactly the same whistle signals or assign the same meanings. Some railroads will use their own variations of the above. A few of the signals are obsolete because the workers they were used to communicate with (such as flagman) are now obsolete.

=== Other whistle codes ===
In Norway these signals are used:

Sequence	Meaning
▄	Stand by or general acknowledgement
▄ ▄	Apply or increase manual brakes
▄ ▄ ▄	Apply manual brakes to stop the train as soon as possible
▄▄▄	Approaching railroad station or blind curve
▄▄▄ ▄	Decrease manual brakes; when repeated, fully release brakes
▄▄▄ ▄ ▄	Prepared for change of tracks, crossing or other situations that requires a gentle approach
Multiple short	Danger

These are some of the signals used in Finland:

Sequence	Meaning
▄	Engine is starting forwards
▄ ▄	Engine is about to move backwards
▄▄▄ ▄	Warning, used approaching a crossing
▄▄▄ ▄▄▄ ▄▄▄	Danger

== See also ==
- Doppler effect, which shifts the tone heard by an observer as a train passes
- Hancock air whistle
- Train horn
- Whistle post
