= New York Central T-Motor =

Series of classes of American Electric locomotives

NYC T Motor
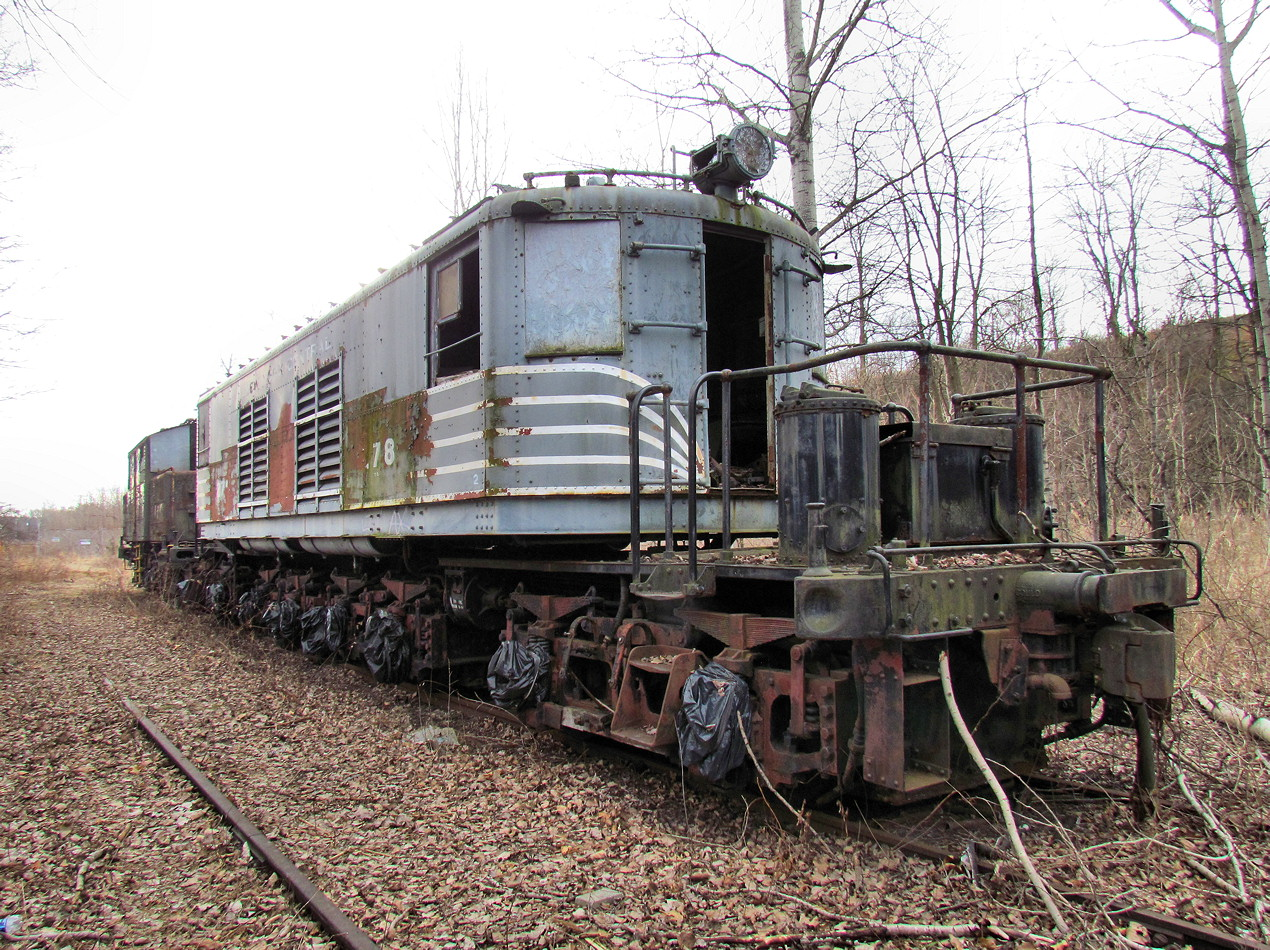
- NYC No. 278, the sole surviving T-Motor locomotive before its movement to the Danbury Railway Museum
Type and origin
- Power type: Electric
- Builder: ALCO-GE
- Build date: 1913-1926
- Total produced: T-1a: 1 T-1b: 9 T-2a: 6 T-2b: 10; T-3a: 10; Total: 36
Specifications
- Configuration
  - AAR: B-B+B-B
  - UIC: Bo'Bo+BoBo'
- Gauge: 4 ft 8 1/2 in (1,435 mm)
- Driver dia.: 36 in (914 mm)
- Length: T-1: 55 ft 2 in (16.81 m); T-2, T-3: 56 ft 10 in (17.32 m)
- Loco weight: T-1: 236,000 lb (107.0 tonnes); T-2: 265,000 lb (120.2 tonnes); T-3: 285,000 lb (129.3 tonnes)
- Electric system/s: 660 V DC third rail
- Current pickup: Contact shoe
- Traction motors: 8 × GE 91-A 380 hp (280 kW)
- Transmission: Resistance controlled DC current supplied to gearless DC traction motors mounted directly on the axles.
Performance figures
- Maximum speed: 75 mph (121 km/h)
- Power output: 3,040 hp (2,270 kW) Starting; 2,500 hp (1,900 kW) Continuous
- Tractive effort: T-1: 59,000 lbf (260 kN); T-2: 66,000 lbf (290 kN); T-3: 71,000 lbf (320 kN)
Career
- Disposition: One preserved, remainder scrapped

T-Motor was the class designation given by the New York Central to its ALCO-GE built T-1a, T-1b, T-2a, T-2b, and T-3a electric locomotives. The T-Motors were the New York Central's second electric locomotive purchase after the original class of S-Motors. The T-motors continued on in service with the New York Central and a few continued on with the Penn Central after the 1968 merger.

== History ==
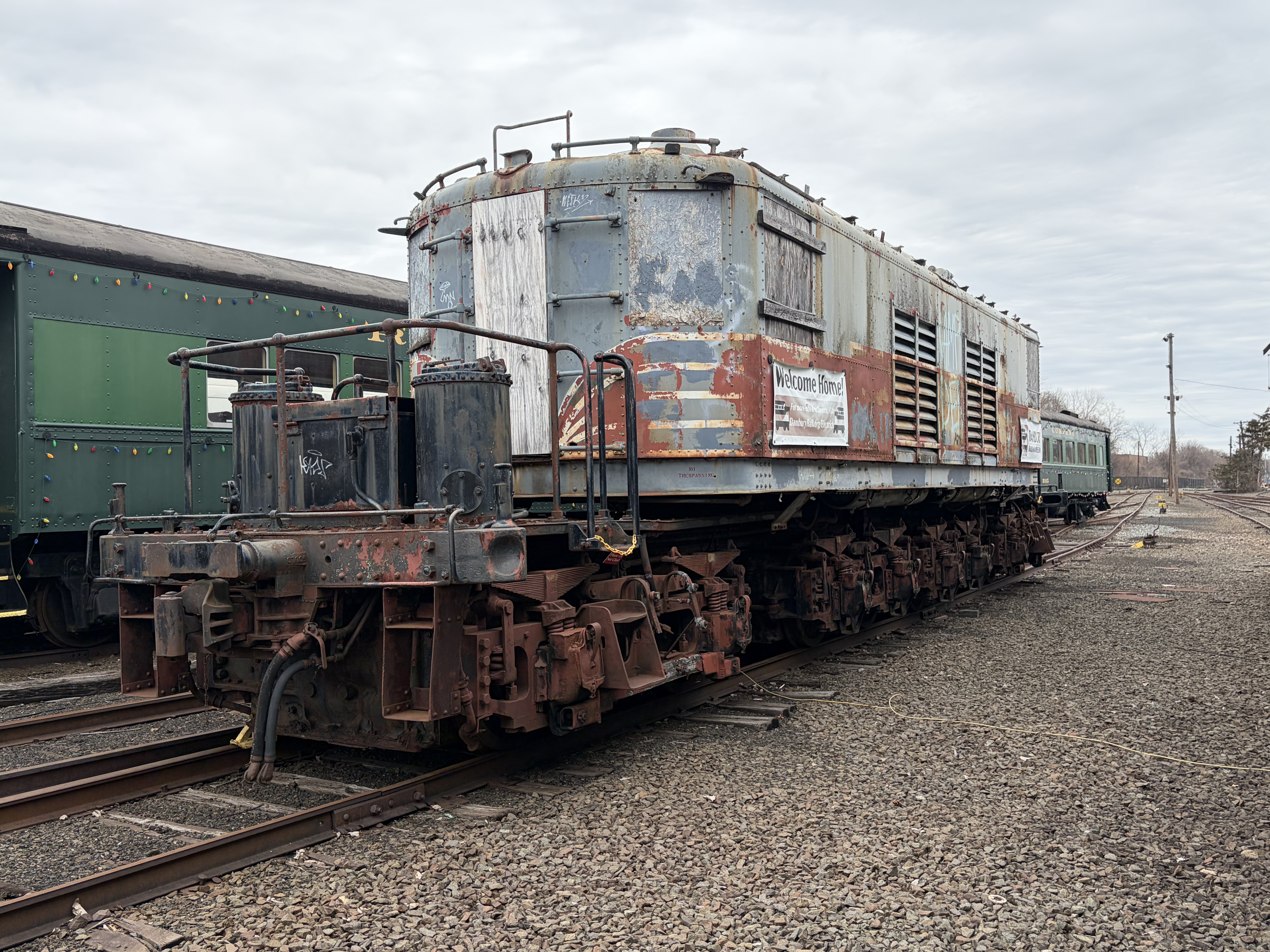
New York Central No. 278 at the Danbury Railway Museum

ALCO and GE co-built T-Motors from 1913 to 1926 to take over the main line passenger duties from the earlier and somewhat less capable S-Motor classes. Like the rest of the eastern electric fleet T-Motors were only used on the third rail territory from Grand Central Terminal on to the Hudson and Harlem Divisions. Compared to the S-Motors the T's had more power and with no unpowered wheels all of the locomotive's weight could be transferred into tractive effort. The T-Motors were also faster than the S-Motors and hauled everything from commuter trains to the flagship 20th Century Limited.

The first major blow to the fleet of T's was when the Cleveland Union Terminal electrified operations shut down in the mid 1950s, freeing up the fleet of 22 P-Motors for conversion to 3rd rail power. Although reduced to secondary duties 6 T's survived into the Penn Central era when they were finally replaced by New York, New Haven and Hartford FL9s on the Penn Central roster.

One T Motor, NYC 278, survived in derelict condition near Albany, New York, for years until it was secured for transport to the Danbury Railway Museum in Danbury, Connecticut, for preservation. During January 2024, it was safely delivered to Danbury where it awaits a cosmetic restoration. The remainder of the T-Motors were scrapped.

== Footnotes ==
- Penn Central Railroad Online
