= New York Central P Motor =

NYC P Motor
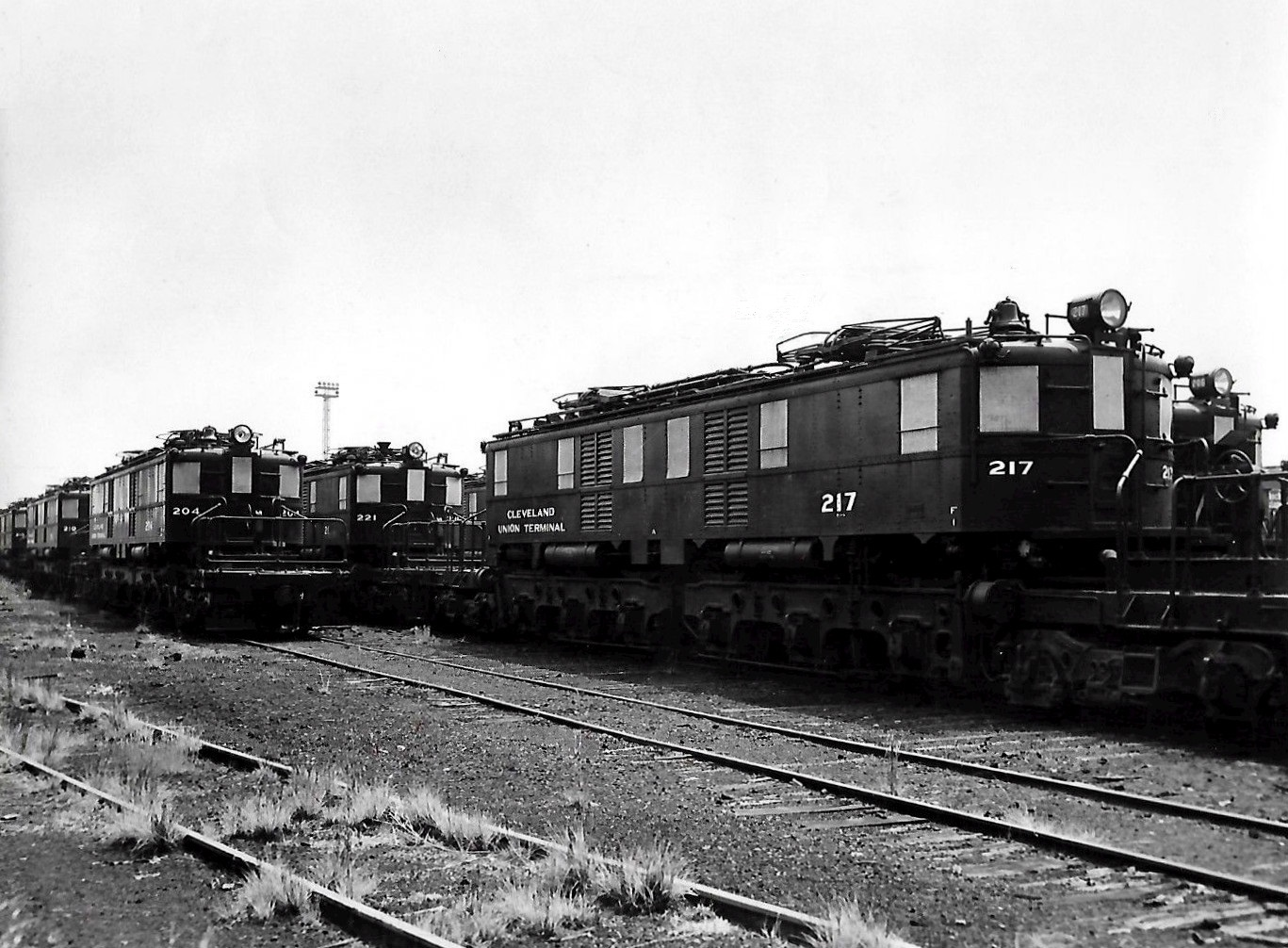
- NYC-P locomotives at General Electric, Erie, for electrical modification, 1954
Type and origin
- Power type: Electric
- Builder: ALCO-GE
- Build date: 1929-1930
- Total produced: P-1a: 22; P-1a Rebuilt as P-2a: 1 P-1a Rebuilt as P-2b: 20
Specifications
- Configuration
  - AAR: 2-C+C-2
  - UIC: (2′Co)(Co2′)
- Gauge: 4 ft 8 1/2 in (1,435 mm)
- Leading dia.: 36 in (914 mm)
- Driver dia.: 48 in (1,219 mm)
- Length: 80 ft 0 in (24.38 m)
- Adhesive weight: P-1a: 311,000 lb (141.1 tonnes); P-2a: 296,300 lb (134.4 tonnes); P-2b: 288,500 lb (130.9 tonnes)
- Loco weight: P-1a: 418,900 lb (190.0 tonnes); P-2a: 406,000 lb (184.2 tonnes); P-2b: 388,000 lb (176.0 tonnes)
- Electric system/s: P-1a: 3000 V DC; P-2: 660 V DC
- Current pickup(s): P-1a: Overhead DC with dual pantographs P-2: Third rail
- Traction motors: P-1a: 6 × GE 278C 505 hp (377 kW); P-2: 6 x GE 755A
- Transmission: Resistance controlled DC current supplied to DC nose suspended traction motors.
Performance figures
- Maximum speed: 70 mph (110 km/h)
- Power output: 3,030 hp (2,260 kW)
- Tractive effort: 77,925 lbf (346.63 kN)

P-Motor was the class designation given by the New York Central a fleet of 22 ALCO-GE electric passenger locomotives. The P Motors were not only more powerful than previous New York Central electrics, but also a more advanced design using the highly successful 2-C+C-2 wheel arrangement found on the later PRR GG1 and New Haven EP-3 classes as well as nose suspended traction motors. Although originally built and owned by a consortium of railroads involved in the large scale Cleveland Union Terminal project, the New York Central was the majority owner and later acquired them outright in the 1950s when the Terminal's electrification scheme was scrapped in favor of diesel locomotives. Rebuilt and re-classified as P-2, the 21 remaining engines were sent to the New York electrified zone to supplement the aging fleet of T-Motors that had been purchased starting in 1913. There they played out the remainder of their careers pulling the Central's premier passenger trains.

== History ==
In the 1920s the Van Sweringen brothers conceived of a new "Union" station for all trains coming into Cleveland via the various railroad lines in a concept similar to New York City's Grand Central Terminal. The new terminal would be situated under a large office and retail development including a 52-story tower. From the subterranean platforms the trains would need to ascend a long steep ramp to a new bridge over the Cuyahoga River. As with other underground station projects, the existing steam locomotive technology would be unacceptable due to the large amounts of exhaust gases and soot expelled from the smoke stack.

The solution was an electrification project that would see passenger trains using the terminal switch to electric power before entering the confines of the station area. To build and equip this new railroad line, a consortium was formed to build the new track, bridge, and electrical system as well as to buy a fleet of locomotives to power the trains. As the New York Central was to be the station's principal operator as well as the party responsible for maintenance at its Collinwood Yard shop facilities, the New York Central tapped long time electric locomotive team ALCO-GE to design and build the required units.

The 22 unit strong fleet of P-1a locomotives were designed for the 3000 volt DC electrification system and could develop about 3000 horsepower. The units, painted in the New York Central style but lettered for Cleveland Union Terminal, went into service in 1929 and worked for the next 20 years running from Collinwood to Linndale and back with whatever passenger train needed to stop at the station.

In 1951, as increasing use of diesel electric locomotives was making the use of electrics and their associated power changes unnecessary, the New York Central looked at converting the fleet to 660 DC third rail operation for use in its New York electrified zone, which had not seen a new delivery of a passenger locomotive since 1926. A single prototype, reclassified P-2a, was converted in the railroad's own Harmon Shops. After being proved satisfactory the remaining 20 units still in service were sent back to GE in 1955 to have the electrical equipment changed over. This work actually resulted in a rather significant weight savings with no loss of power or tractive effort. The lower-voltage motors installed, which had thinner insulation and more windings, resulted in a horsepower increase to 4243 hp.

The P-2 fleet continued in service pulling the New York Central's premier passenger trains between Croton-Harmon and Grand Central Terminal. A few survived into the Penn Central era, but after significant reductions in long distance passenger service in the 1970s the fleet was retired. All surviving units were scrapped starting in 1972 with none being preserved.
