= EMD FL9 =

American electro-diesel locomotive

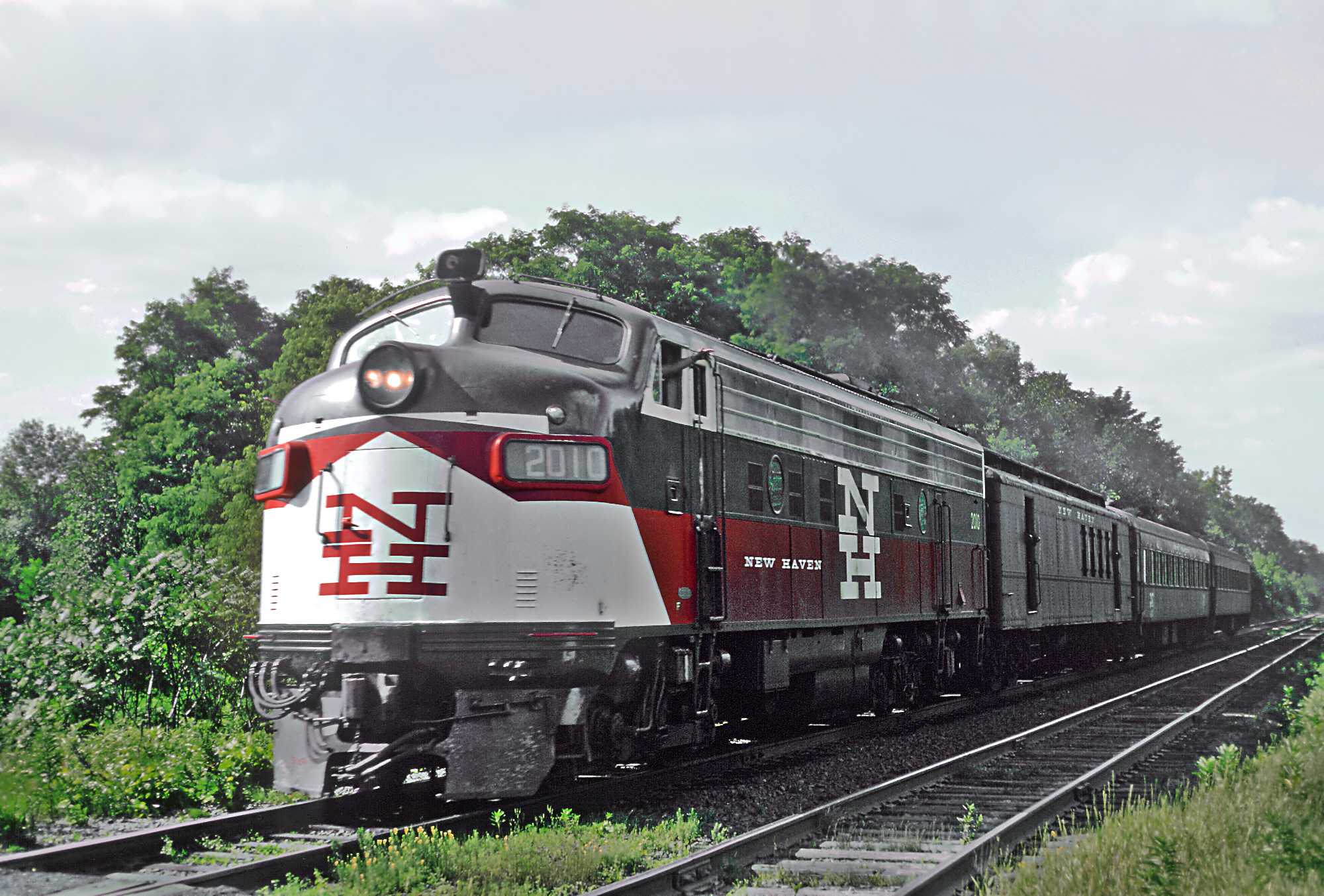
- New Haven FL9 No. 2010 in Enfield, Connecticut in 1968
Type and origin
- Power type: Electro-diesel
- Builder: General Motors Electro-Motive Division (EMD)
- Model: FL9
- Build date: October 1956 – November 1960
- Total produced: 60
Specifications
- Configuration
  - AAR: B-A1A
  - UIC: Bo'(A1A)
- Gauge: 4 ft 8 1/2 in (1,435 mm)
- Length: 59 ft 0 in (17.98 m)
- Loco weight: 284,500 lb (129,000 kg) (2000 to 2029); 279,950 lb (126,980 kg) (2030 to 2059)
- Fuel type: Diesel
- Electric system/s: Third rail, 600 V DC
- Current pickup: Contact shoe
- Prime mover: EMD 567C (2000–2029), EMD 567D1 (2030–2059)
- Engine type: V16 Two-stroke diesel
- Generator: D32 DC generator
- Traction motors: D37 DC traction motors
- Cylinders: 16
- Transmission: Electric
- Loco brake: Air
- Train brakes: Air
Performance figures
- Maximum speed: 89 mph (143 km/h)
- Power output: 567C: 1,750 hp (1,300 kW), 567D1: 1,800 hp (1,300 kW)
- Tractive effort: 56,940 lbf (253.28 kN) (EDER-5); 56,500 lbf (251.32 kN) (EDER-5A)
Career
- Operators: New Haven, Penn Central, Amtrak, Conrail, CTDOT, Metro-North
- Class: EDER-5 (2000-2029), EDER-5a (2030-2059)
- Locale: North America
- Disposition: Retired from revenue service, some units preserved, several in operation at museums or with private owners

The EMD FL9 is a model of electro-diesel locomotive, capable of operating either as a traditional diesel-electric locomotive or as an electric locomotive powered from a third rail ("dual power"). Sixty units were built between October 1956 and November 1960 by General Motors Electro-Motive Division for the New York, New Haven and Hartford Railroad (the "New Haven"). The locomotives were designed to allow diesel-powered trains to enter Grand Central Terminal, where non-electric locomotives are forbidden.

The FL9s were additionally intended to allow for the retirement of electric locomotives by the New Haven and the dismantling of electrification to save money. Only the electrification on the Danbury Branch was actually dismantled, negating a key reason the locomotives were purchased. However, the FL9s did make it possible for trains serving non-electrified lines to continue to Grand Central without stopping at New Haven, Connecticut, to switch locomotives.

The FL9s continued in passenger and occasional freight service under the New Haven's successor Penn Central, expanding their range to the Harlem Line and the Hudson Line in New York State. Conrail succeeded Penn Central in 1976 and sold 12 units to Amtrak for use on the Hudson Line. Its remaining units went to Metro-North Railroad in 1983, some purchased by the Connecticut Department of Transportation (CTDOT). Amtrak, Metro-North, and CTDOT all sent FL9s for rebuilding to extend their service lives.

Amtrak retired its FL9s in the late 1990s when new P32AC-DM locomotives that replicated their role entered service. Metro-North began replacing its FL9s in 1995 with new P32AC-DM locomotives, restricting them to branch lines in 2001. The remaining FL9s were no longer capable of third-rail operation due to their advanced age. New locomotives allowed for the final FL9s owned by Metro-North and CTDOT to be retired in 2009. More than 20 FL9s have been preserved at museums or with private owners; several remain in operation.

== Design and production ==
=== Background ===
Due to concerns about diesel emissions in the East River Tunnels and the underground tracks of Grand Central Terminal and Penn Station, passenger trains entering New York City have long been required to use electrical power, as coal and later diesel exhaust would pose a hazard to human health in the confined underground spaces. The ban was originally enacted by the city in 1903, and in response the New York Central Railroad installed third rail electrification on the Harlem Line, which New Haven trains used to reach Grand Central. To allow its own service to Grand Central, New Haven trackage between Woodlawn and New Haven, Connecticut, 72 miles (116 km) east from Grand Central, was electrified at 11,000 volts, 25 Hz AC overhead, with all catenary installed by 1914. The New Haven's pioneering system was used as an example for electrification projects by other railroads, including on the Northeast Corridor between New York and Washington, D.C.

Plans to extend the electrification eastward towards Boston were never realized due to the railroad's financial troubles. To allow passenger trains to travel to New York City from non-electrified lines without requiring a change of locomotives, the New Haven Railroad sought a class of locomotive that could switch between diesel and electric power on the fly. A replacement was also due for the railroad's 60 ALCO DL-109 locomotives built in the 1940s.

Introduction of a new dual-mode locomotive also aligned with railroad president Patrick B. McGinnis' plans to eliminate the railroad's electrification system east of Stamford, Connecticut, and scrap its entire fleet of pre-1955 electric locomotives, in a cost-cutting measure described by author Scott Hartley as "ill-advised". Key to the plan was eliminating the aging Cos Cob Power Station, built in 1906.

=== Design ===
The earliest attempt at developing a dual-mode locomotive to meet this need began with a proposal to gut the internals of the DL-109s and install both a new diesel engine and equipment to collect electrical power from the third rail via contact shoes and deliver it to the traction motors. The proposal would also save money by reusing existing equipment and eliminating the cost of buying new locomotives. However, it was found unworkable because the weight of the resulting locomotive was estimated to exceed the weight restrictions on the Park Avenue Viaduct in New York City. Afterwards, both ALCO (manufacturer of the DL-109s) and Fairbanks-Morse submitted proposed dual-mode locomotive designs to the New Haven; neither proposed design was within the weight limit for the Park Avenue Viaduct.

EMD's answer was a new locomotive based on their existing EMD FP9, but lengthened to accommodate additional equipment, such as a larger train heating steam boiler, extra electrical equipment, and contact shoes for drawing power from a third rail. The resulting design was named the FL9 ("L" indicating "long"). The FL9s were the final members of the long-running EMD F-unit line, in production since 1945. Due to the additional weight and existing weight restrictions on the Park Avenue Viaduct, the locomotive was equipped with a three-axle rear truck, giving it a B-A1A wheel arrangement in the AAR system (indicating the middle axle of the rear truck is unpowered). Flexicoil trucks were used for the rear truck due to this type of truck having more room for fitting the third rail shoes. The locomotives measured 59 feet (18.0 m) in length and weighed approximately 284,500 lb (129,000 kg). Maximum speed was 89 miles per hour (143 km/h). The locomotives used D32 DC generators to supply current to the D37 DC traction motors.

For electric operation, the FL9 was capable of using either an over-running or under-running third rail by means of retractable shoes operated by pneumatic cylinders. For operation into the Pennsylvania Railroad's Pennsylvania Station, (Note: Most New Haven trains terminated at Grand Central. Some, such as services bound for Washington, D.C., operated via Pennsylvania Station.) the FL9 used the Long Island Rail Road's third rail system. A DC electric compressor provided air for the brake system when the diesel engine was off. To handle the massive amount of electric current available from the third rail, the locomotive's dynamic braking system operated as a resistor when applying power from a stop or otherwise accelerating. Twenty-eight different steps within the electrical system allowed for the regulation of current supplied to the traction motors based on the locomotive's speed.

All units were painted in the bright McGinnis scheme of red-orange, black and white and the Herbert Matter-designed "NH" logo. FL9s were initially fitted with the Hancock air whistle instead of standard air horns.

=== Production and testing ===
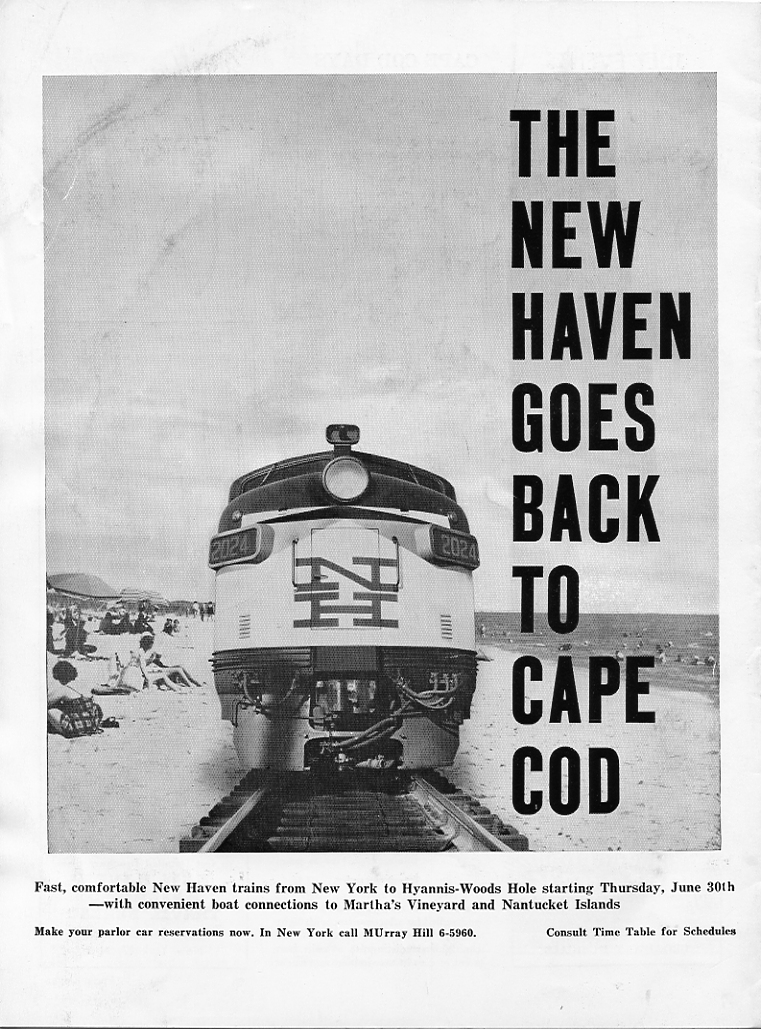
A 1960 advertisement for Cape Codder trains featuring the new FL9 locomotives

New Haven Railroad president Patrick B. McGinnis initially proposed purchasing 88 FL9s, though the railroad was ultimately unable to afford this quantity. Instead, an initial order was placed for 30 units, numbered 2000 to 2029. The first two members of the class (2000 and 2001) began production in October 1956 and entered service with the New Haven towards the beginning of 1957. They were built with Blomberg B front trucks, but these were quickly replaced with Flexicoil trucks as the Blomberg trucks lacked room for fitting a contact shoe. They were first sent to the Harlem Line, at the time operated by the New York Central Railroad, where the third rail equipment was tested. The tests ended with units 2000 and 2001 both suffering electrical fires, so they were returned to EMD to resolve identified issues. The electrical fires were traced to issues with insulation. Testing also revealed that the contact shoes would sometimes break off of the locomotive when connecting to the third rail. EMD completed its work and returned the units to the railroad approximately six months later, and this time they completed third rail testing without issues. Full delivery of the first 30 units commenced following the satisfactory completion of testing.

The initial order of FL9s (2000 to 2029, New Haven Railroad class EDER-5, indicating electric-diesel-electric-road) were built between October 1956 and November 1957 with the 16-cylinder EMD 567C engine generating a nominal power of 1,750 hp (1,305 kW). The first 30 units were priced at $280,000 each (equivalent to $3,127,000 in 2024) for a total cost of $8.4 million (equivalent to $94,000,000 in 2024). Several features on the first order were not repeated on the second order placed a few years later. These included the provision of an extra seat in the locomotive cabs for use by a brakeman and multiple-unit connections on both the front and rear; both of these changes were meant to support using FL9s to pull freight trains. Dynamic brakes were also excluded from the second order of FL9s, with only the resistor grids kept.

Additionally, the first 30 locomotives supplemented their contact shoes with a small DC pantograph for use within New York City's Grand Central Terminal, where long gaps exist in the third rail because of the complex trackage that includes numerous railroad switches. Short sections of overhead catenary (provided in the form of overhead mounted third rail) were placed within the terminal trackage by the New York Central in case locomotives stalled out in a gap or had issues with their contact shoes, so that locomotive power could be restored by raising a pantograph. This system was disliked and not used by most engineers, and there were multiple incidents where the pantograph was extended too soon, struck the overhead third rail and dislodged it from the ceiling; "the resulting fireworks caused considerable damage". The pantographs were deleted from the second locomotive order as a result.

The second order of FL9s (2030 to 2059, New Haven Railroad class EDER-5a) were built between June and November 1960 with the 16-cylinder EMD 567D1 engine generating nominal power of 1,800 hp (1,342 kW). The purchase of the second set of locomotives was only made possible by government-supported loans to the railroad. The 30 FL9s cost a total of $8,310,000 (equivalent to $88,000,000 in 2024). The changes to the design brought the weight of these units down to 279,950 lb (126,980 kg).

== Operating history ==
=== New Haven operation ===
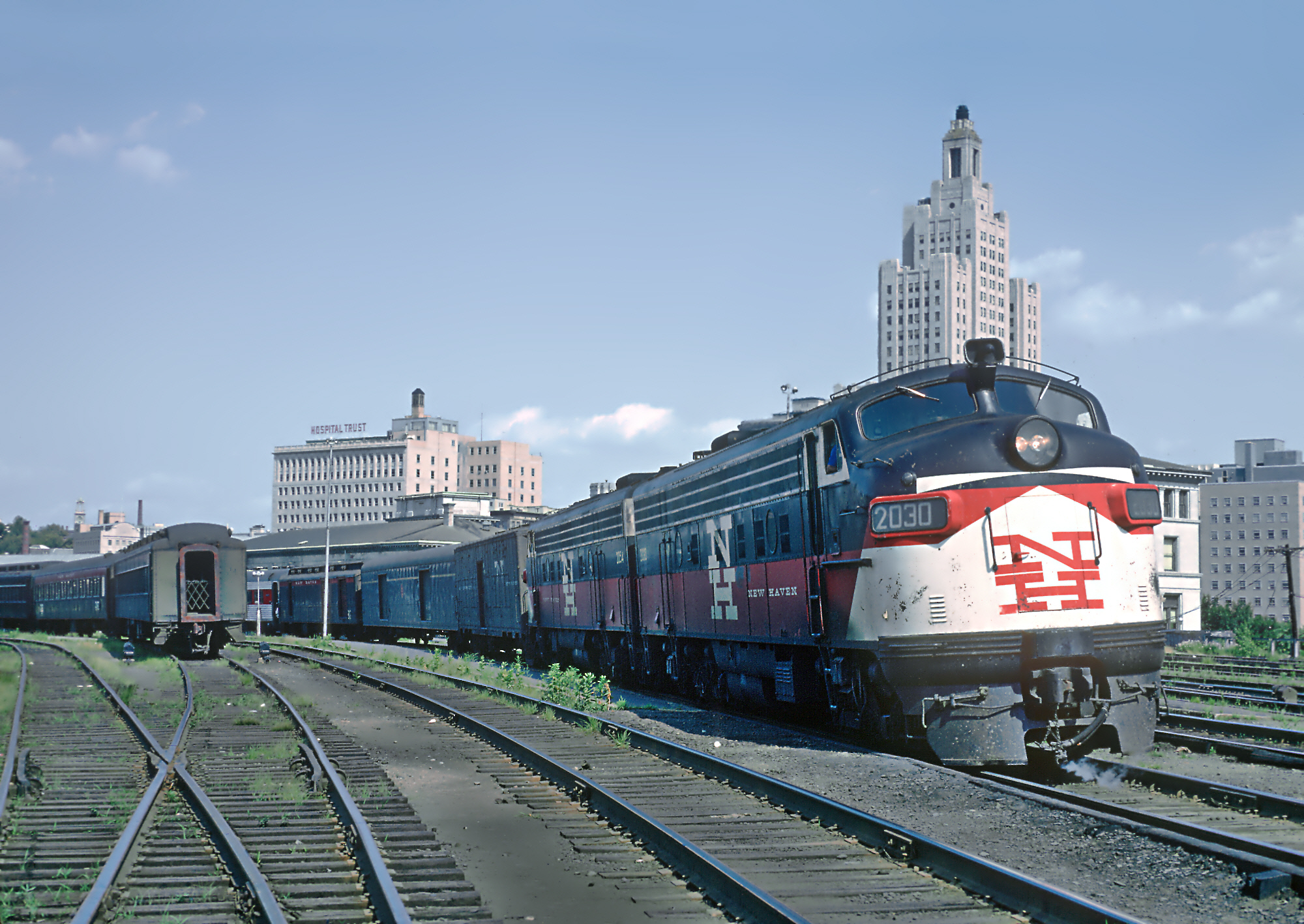
Two FL9s with the Puritan at Providence Union Station in July 1968

The FL9s allowed through passenger trains from Grand Central Terminal to reach Boston, Springfield, and other non-electrified destinations without the need for an engine change at New Haven, theoretically resulting in up to ten minutes of savings on train schedules. In practice, the railroad was not able to eliminate engine changes for trains at New Haven, and the required time for locomotive changes was never taken out of train timetables even for FL9-hauled trains. Once the FL9s were delivered, the New Haven promptly took all of its electric locomotives out of service apart from the 1955-built EP-5s. The arrival of FL9s also led to the retirement of most of the railroad's older diesel locomotives previously assigned to passenger service.

In 1958, New Haven Railroad president George Alpert boasted that the FL9 combined "the advantages and operating characteristics of the diesel and the electric locomotive". Trains Magazine editor David P. Morgan found this claim to be questionable, since just one of the New Haven's EP-5 electric locomotives was rated for 4,000 hp (2,983 kW) compared to the 3,500 hp (2,610 kW) produced by a pair of FL9s; an EP-5 could also produce double its rated continuous horsepower by overloading its engines in a brief burst. The EP-5 was also both 49 feet (14.9 m) shorter and 232,000 lb (105,000 kg) lighter than a pair of FL9s. Morgan concluded that the purchase of the FL9s might make financial sense only if the New Haven proceeded with its plans to abandon electrification east of Stamford, Connecticut and retire electric locomotives, though the removal of the electrification would itself be a loss for the railroad.

Writing on the railroad's financial troubles in the wake of its second bankruptcy in 1961, Morgan described the FL9s as "controversial". In a report analyzing the New Haven's problems, the Interstate Commerce Commission (ICC) singled out the FL9 purchase as a mistake, calling the supposed financial savings associated with their acquisition "a mirage". General Motors took exception to the report, saying that the savings it had promised were predicated on the railroad adopting the FL9s en masse and retiring other locomotive types; instead, the New Haven continued maintaining normal diesel locomotives, the FL9s, and electric locomotives at the same time.

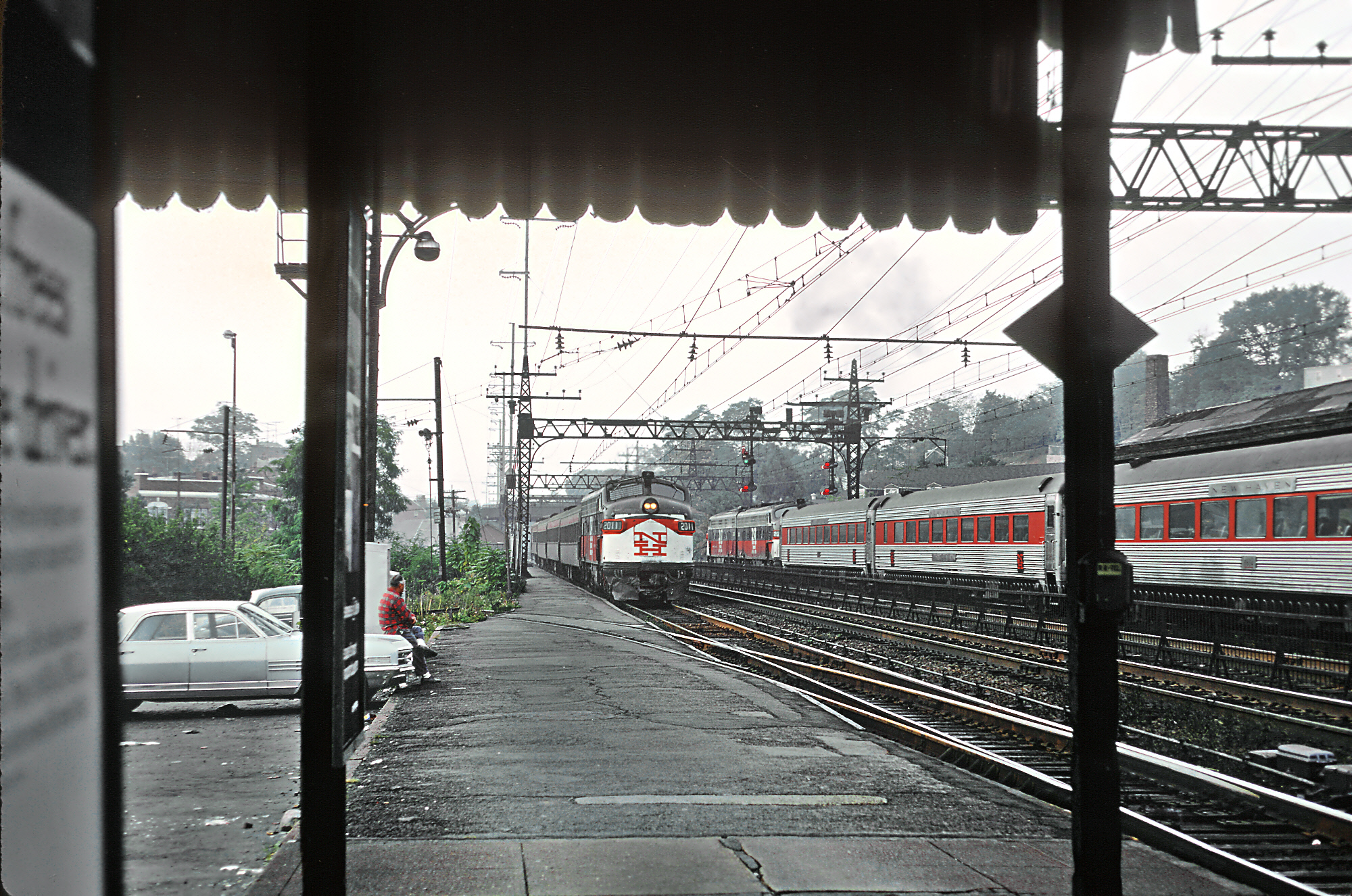
An FL9 with a train at South Norwalk in 1968. Two FL9s lead another train in the opposite direction

In any event, the bankruptcy trustees identified running diesels like the FL9 under the electrical catenary to be a costly waste. Taking its electric freight locomotives out of service in 1959 had not relieved the railroad from its contractual obligation to purchase the electricity to run them from power suppliers, and electrified passenger operations continued regardless. In 1963, the trustees purchased eleven EF4 electric locomotives from the Norfolk and Western Railway after that company dismantled the electrification system it inherited from the Virginian Railway, reversing the prior plans to phase out electric operation. These locomotives, built between 1956 and 1957, were obtained for just $300,000 (equivalent to $3,000,000 in 2024). The existing EP-5s, stored since 1959, were rebuilt by GE and returned to operation.

While freight service was mostly returned to the electric locomotives, FL9s continued to haul most passenger trains between Grand Central and either Springfield Union Station or Boston South Station, with no engine change required at New Haven. FL9s also powered passenger trains along the Danbury Branch and further north to Pittsfield, Massachusetts. Their arrival allowed the New Haven to scrap its electrification system between South Norwalk and Danbury. The FL9s were also regularly assigned to the seasonal Cape Codder trains on the railroad's lines serving Cape Cod. Special runs chartered by railfans meant that FL9s could occasionally be seen nearly anywhere on the New Haven's system.

Other railroads operating into New York City were curious to examine the FL9s: during the 1960s the New York Central tested them on the Harlem Line and the Pennsylvania Railroad (PRR) tested them on the New York and Long Branch Railroad. Tests on the Harlem Line showed eliminating an engine change at North White Plains station allowed seven minutes to be cut from the train's schedule. Testing by the PRR was less successful as the borrowed FL9s caught fire in the North River Tunnels, ending interest by that railroad. Ultimately, the New Haven was the only railroad to buy FL9s.

=== Penn Central and beyond ===
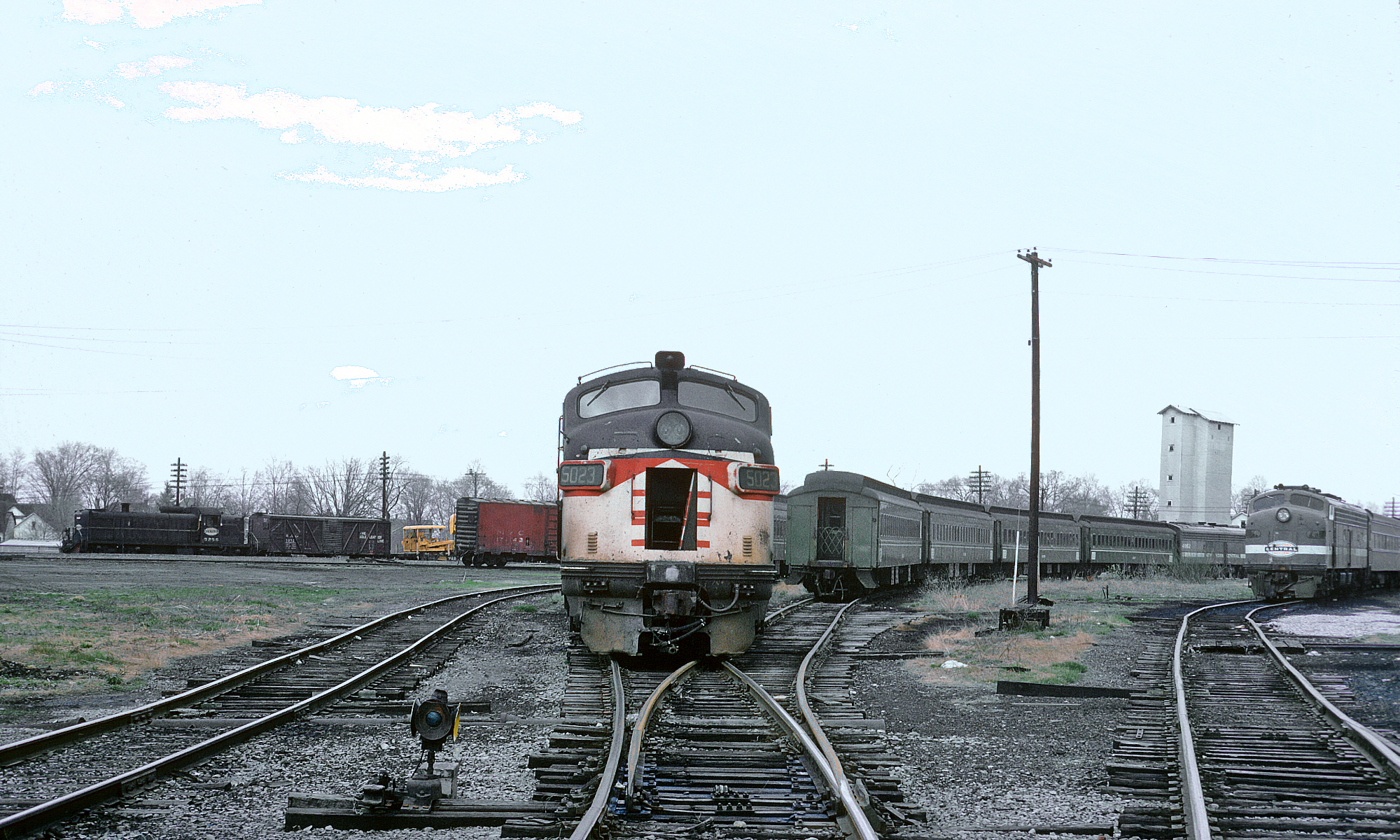
Penn Central renumbered the FL9s in the 5000 series, including this locomotive at Chatham, New York in 1970

At the end of 1968, the New Haven was absorbed by Penn Central, the new railroad created by the merger of the New York Central and Pennsylvania Railroads. This was mandated by the ICC as a condition of the merger. All sixty FL9s remained in service when Penn Central took ownership of them, though the fleet was showing signs of wear and tear from deferred maintenance. Under Penn Central operation, FL9s began to operate outside New Haven territory on the Harlem Line, as had been tested in 1965. Former PRR EMD E8s joined the FL9s on the Shore Line between New Haven and Boston, and ex-PRR GG1s began operating between New Haven and New York City in place of the EP-5s. Penn Central cut its losses on passenger service in New Haven Railroad territory by sharply reducing service frequency in February 1969. These changes freed up more FL9s for Harlem Line service and occasional use on freight trains. FL9s operating into Grand Central increasingly suffered from electrical breakdowns due to poor maintenance, to the extent that they often operated in diesel mode in the terminal's tunnels, filling them with diesel exhaust.

Penn Central renumbered the locomotives from the 2000 series to the 5000 series. Approximately a dozen FL9s were repainted into black Penn Central paint, with the remainder simply exchanging a 2 for a 5 in their number. Once the Metropolitan Transportation Authority (MTA) began funding Penn Central's commuter services in 1970, many of the FL9s were repainted blue with a bright yellow nose, although they remained Penn Central-owned. The new paint scheme was meant to complement the MTA's acquisition of used stainless-steel coaches from other railroads for use on Penn Central's trains on former New York Central lines. Most FL9s given black Penn Central paint were updated with the new MTA colors, though many of the FL9s that Penn Central had yet to repaint kept their New Haven black, white, and red. Penn Central simply replaced instances of "NH" with "PC" at the behest of its president William H. Moore, who wanted to present a unified image on all Penn Central equipment. Penn Central also removed the dynamic brakes from units 5000 through 5029.

Government-created Amtrak assumed ownership and operation of most intercity rail services on May 1, 1971. The new company consolidated all intercity service from New England at Penn Station, and GG1s replaced the FL9s on intercity trains like the Merchants Limited and Yankee Clipper.

In 1972, the MTA decided to bring FL9s to the Hudson Line, where they could operate trains between New York City and Poughkeepsie station without the engine change at Croton–Harmon station that was previously required where electrification north from New York City ended. Amtrak leased several FL9s in 1974 for Empire Service trains from New York City to Croton–Harmon, replacing all remaining New York Central P Motors. Retiring the P Motors meant that all Grand Central Terminal passenger trains not handled by electric multiple units were powered by FL9s.

Penn Central retired units 5011, 5032, 5050, and 5051, leaving 56 FL9s in service when Conrail absorbed Penn Central on April 1, 1976. Twelve were sold to Amtrak for use on Empire Service trains serving New York City. Several of Amtrak's units were inoperable by the time the railroad bought them, so additional FL9s were leased from Conrail as needed for Empire Service trains.

=== Rebuilds and retirements ===
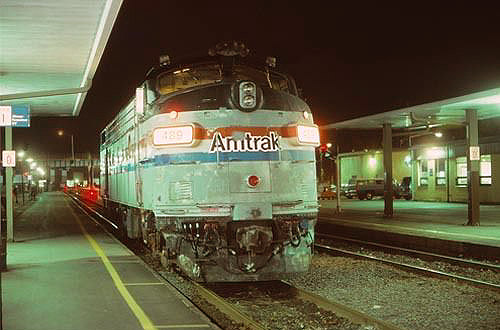
An Amtrak FL9 at Albany–Rensselaer station in October 1991

Amtrak addressed the age of its FL9s by retiring half and sending the other half to Morrison–Knudsen in Boise, Idaho, for rebuilding from 1978 to 1980. The MTA paid for seven Conrail units operating on the Hudson Line to be rebuilt by GE at Hornell, New York, from 1979 to 1980. The rebuilt units left Hornell in a new MTA livery combining blue and silver.

The United States Congress directed Conrail to fully exit the passenger business effective January 1, 1983. Seven FL9s were retired by Conrail before that date, leaving 37 units; the Connecticut Department of Transportation (CTDOT) directly purchased four for Danbury Branch service while the other 33 went to the newly formed Metro-North Railroad, created by the MTA to assume Conrail's passenger operations in New York and Connecticut. Ahead of the transfer of ownership, the CTDOT announced in 1982 that it was sending its four FL9s to Chrome Crankshaft in Silvis, Illinois, for rebuilding and restoration into the New Haven-era McGinnis livery. Railfans originally proposed that one of the locomotives be given the McGinnis livery and supplied details on the correct design. The department adopted the livery for all four units. Metro-North returned all of these units to 2000 series numbers like the original units, though changes in the fleet and the order that renumbering was completed in meant that none had the original number they were built with. A revised paint scheme adding red to the previous silver and blue was applied to Metro-North units starting in 1983.

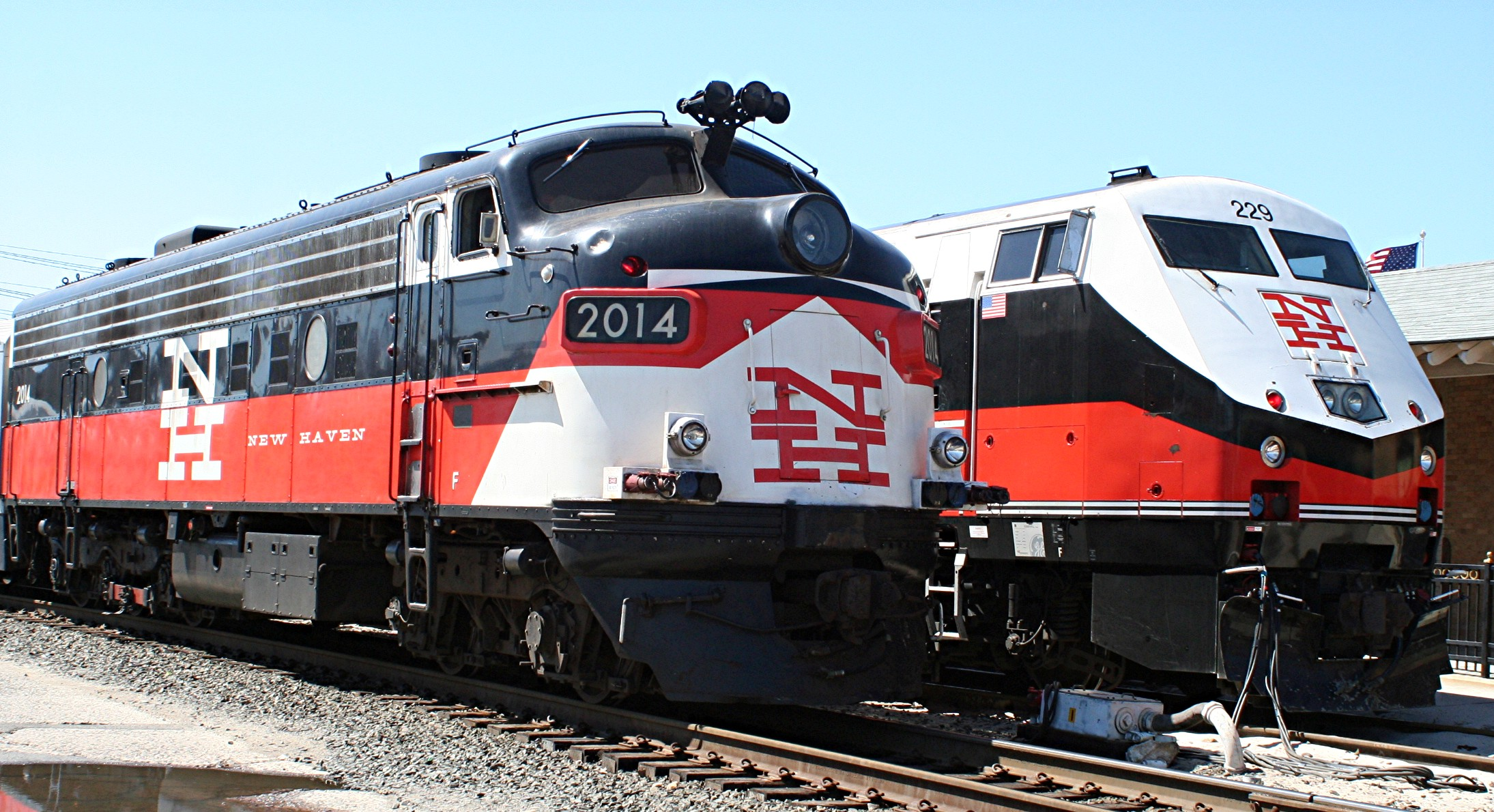
A CTDOT FL9 and P32AC-DM near Danbury station in 2006. Both locomotives wear versions of the McGinnis livery

Metro-North originally planned to retire its FL9s during the 1980s but chose to instead extend their service lives when the railroad took delivery of new push–pull passenger cars. This delayed their anticipated retirement beyond the year 2000. Towards the end of the 1980s, ten additional FL9s were identified for complete rebuilding by the MTA. These were to be converted to AC traction and reengined with 3,200 hp (2,386 kW) EMD 710 engines. Four of the ten locomotives, all of which were designated FL9AC after rebuilding, were previously retired by Metro-North and to be returned to service under the rebuilding program. ABB was hired by the MTA to rebuild the ten FL9s, with five rebuilt directly by ABB in Elmira Heights, New York, and the other five subcontracted to Republic Locomotive in Greenville, South Carolina. The Republic units were completed first, arriving starting in 1991 and entering service in 1992. Three FL9ACs were to be for the Long Island Rail Road while the other seven were for Metro-North. Long Island Rail Road's three FL9ACs were assigned to a through train between Port Jefferson station and Penn Station. The FL9AC failed to meet what was promised from the model and had limited service lives as a result. While technologically advanced for their time, third rail operation was unreliable as any momentary gaps in contact would force the installed computer systems to reboot.

FL9s entered service on the Waterbury Branch for the first time in 1991, allowing the existing Budd Rail Diesel Cars (RDCs) dating from the New Haven era to be retired. The FL9s allowed for single-seat service from Waterbury to New York City for the first time since the 1950s. In 1993, CTDOT announced it would purchase six more FL9s from Metro-North and send them to Morrison–Knudsen for comprehensive rebuilds, including upgrading the prime movers with EMD 645 power assemblies and enhanced head-end power generation capabilities. All ten CTDOT units wore the McGinnis livery, which was further applied to 15 additional units of other models owned by the department in subsequent years.

Amtrak replaced its six FL9s towards the end of the 1990s with new P32AC-DM locomotives, which retained the dual power capabilities of the FL9. Their retirement was delayed by the unexpected removal of Amtrak's Turboliners from service, and the FL9s served alongside the P32s for several years as the new locomotives were initially unreliable when operating under electrical power. Metro-North began retiring FL9s from service on main lines in 1995 as it accepted new P32AC-DMs, completing the process in 2001. Replacement of the FL9s on main line trains was delayed by P32 issues similar to those experienced by Amtrak. Metro-North continued to operate FL9s on branch lines until the purchase of new Brookville BL20GH locomotives allowed their final retirement in 2009. The FL9s were restricted to branch lines near the end of their lives since they lost the ability to operate on third rail power. The Long Island Rail Road ordered EMD DM30AC dual-mode locomotives in the late 1990s after its experimental use of three FL9ACs. The DM30ACs were ordered to allow single seat travel from non-electrified territory through Jamaica station to Penn station. Passengers were previously required to switch from locomotive hauled trains to electric multiple unit trains at Jamaica.

Model versions of the FL9 have been built by Canadian manufacturer Rapido Trains in HO scale and N scale.

== Surviving examples ==
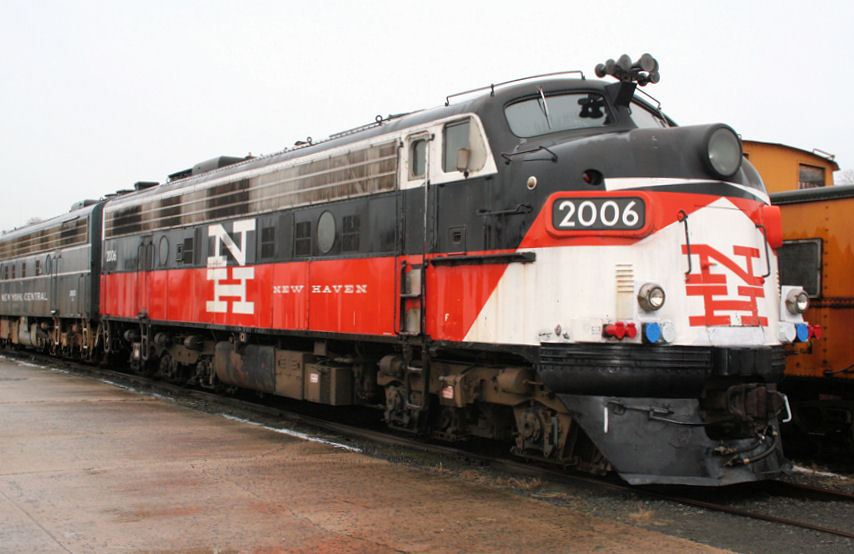
Two FL9s preserved at the Danbury Railway Museum. The FL9 in the background wears an ahistorical New York Central Railroad livery.

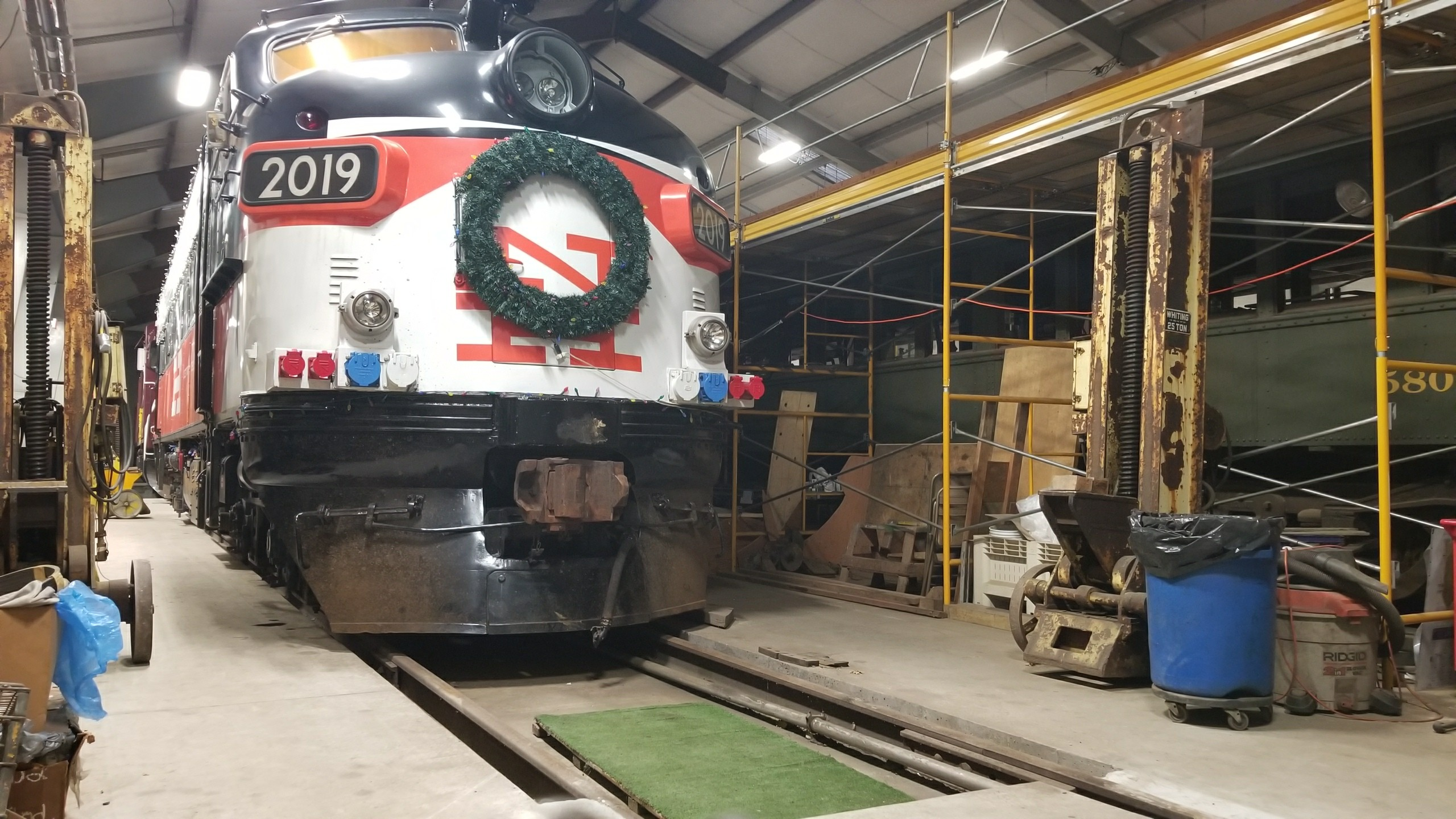
FL9 #2019, preserved at Railroad Museum of New England

An inventory by Classic Trains Magazine in 2015 found that 22 of the original 60 FL9s remained intact, four of which were operable. Six CTDOT units in storage at New Haven Yard were excluded from the count of operable units. All six of these units were sold at auction in 2018 to owners which intended to restore them to operational status.

- Five units retired by Amtrak in the 1990s were purchased by the Morristown and Erie Railway in New Jersey:
  - 488-489 (originally 2016 and 2021) operated on the Maine Eastern Railroad, pulling several excursion trains between Brunswick and Rockland, Maine until the railroad ceased operations in 2015. They were then used in excursion service at the Whippany Railway Museum until October 2020, when Morristown and Erie sold the two units to private owner Webb Rail LLC.
  - 485-487 were cannibalized for usable parts and subsequently stored and offered for sale, but no buyers were found. 486 and 487 were scrapped in 2014, with parts from 486 used to keep units 488 and 489 operational.
- 484 (retired by Amtrak, originally 2029) was operated by the Orford Express in eastern Quebec, Canada.
- 2023 (originally 2057) is preserved at the Connecticut Eastern Railroad Museum.
- 2007 was acquired by the Adirondack Railroad as a source of spare parts but was instead restored to operational status in 2015. The railroad sold it to locomotives dealer LTEX in 2023, where it remains in storage as of 2024.
- 2011 and 2026 (originally 2038 and 2007) were purchased from CTDOT in 2018 by the Massachusetts Coastal Railroad in 2018 for service on the Cape Cod Central Railroad in Massachusetts.
- 2014 and 2016 (originally 2041 and 2044) were acquired from CTDOT in 2018 by the Grapevine Vintage Railroad for use on the railroad's passenger trains.
- 2024 (originally 2058) was purchased from CTDOT in 2018 by private owner Webb Rail LLC, which relocated it to the Berkshire Scenic Railway Museum for restoration to operating status.
- 2027 (originally 2015) was purchased from CTDOT in 2018 by the Boston Surface Railroad, which planned to operate commuter rail service along the Providence and Worcester Railroad main line between Providence, Rhode Island, and Worcester, Massachusetts.
- Two units are owned by the Railroad Museum of New England (RMNE), operator of the Naugatuck Railroad:
  - 2019 (originally 2049) operates in excursion service as of 2025. The locomotive sustained "significant damage" in a June 2025 derailment and was taken out of service for repairs.
  - RMNE also owns 2033 (originally 2059), the last EMD F-unit ever built. 2033 was acquired by the museum in 2002 after preservation efforts dating back to 1984 finally proved successful.
- 2006 and 2013 (originally 2026 and 2040 respectively) have been preserved at the Danbury Railway Museum since 2001 and 2000 respectively. 2006 wears the McGinniss livery, while 2013 wears an ahistorical New York Central Railroad livery applied by Metro North in 1999.
- 2010 and 2028 (originally 2037 and 2018 respectively), former Metro-North units, are stored out of service on the Cooperstown and Charlotte Valley Railroad in Milford, New York, as of 2026. The railroad reported it was repairing unit 2028.
