= List of rail accidents in Indonesia =

This is an incomplete chronological list of railway accidents and incidents in Indonesia.

Railway accidents may be classified by their effects (e.g.: head-on collisions, rear-end collisions, side collisions, derailments, fires, explosions, etc.), or by cause (e.g.: driver and signalman error; mechanical failure of rolling stock, tracks and bridges; vandalism, sabotage and terrorism; level crossing misuse and trespassing; natural causes such as flooding and fog; hazards of dangerous goods carried; effectiveness of brakes; and adequacy of operating rules).

The following is a list of train accidents in Indonesia. Note that if you add a new accident, you must mention the reference. Otherwise, the section will be deleted.

== 1880s ==
=== 1884 ===
- 13 December 1884 – A carriage train carrying telegraph poles had an accident after departing from Padalarang to Tagogapu. The telegraph poles being transported were planned to be lowered just a few hundred meters west of Padalarang Station, precisely on a flat segment of the railway track. However, the train missed the intended drop-off point at high speed and reached the downhill track towards Tagogapu. Workers on board the train likely panicked and failed to apply the emergency brakes. This caused the load to become uncontrollable, with one pole falling to the ground and causing the train to derail. As a result, workers were thrown from the train, resulting in three deaths and three injuries.

== 1900s ==
=== 1906 ===
- 28 December 1906 – Two trains collided on the road section between Lebakjero and Nagreg, precisely at kilometer 192, approximately two kilometers east of Nagreg Station. The accident involved a mixed train (KA 24) from Bandung to Cibatu and a freight train (KA 531) from Cibatu to Cicalengka. The incident resulted in three crew members suffering minor injuries and the derailment of four freight cars and a baggage car. The new line was opened the next day after a one-night evacuation process.

== 1910s ==
=== 1919 ===
- 13 April 1919 – At 8:15 p.m., an express train from Surabaya hit a landslide on the road section between Lebakjero and Nagreg, precisely at kilometer 196+400 or about two kilometers from Lebakjero, south of Citiis Bridge. At the time of the accident, the express train was being pulled by two locomotives with four crew members on board. Of the four, three died (including the driver), while another suffered a broken left arm. Three officers on the mail train suffered serious injuries, while another suffered minor injuries. Most of the train derailed and was damaged due to the telescopic effect, with the front locomotive being destroyed. However, all passengers survived. As a result of this accident, the Bandung-Yogyakarta railway line was cut off for seven days.
- 18 June 1919 – At around 7:00 PM, an express train from Surabaya violated the Lebakjero Station signal, then hit a mixed class train that was being shunted at the Lebakjero yard. The driver of the new express train braked after seeing the train he was about to hit. As a result of this accident, two locomotives pulling the express train were damaged and six carriages derailed. There were no fatalities as a result of this incident.

== 1920s ==
=== 1924 ===
- 24 March 1924 – An express train from Surabaya derailed in Cimekar, then still called Ciendog. The locomotive and its train, which were traveling at a speed of almost 75 km/h, overturned into a rice field. The police and Staatsspoorwegen believe the derailment was caused by sabotage by irresponsible parties who removed the nuts and bolts on the rails. Authorities also revealed that there were no injuries or fatalities in this accident.

== 1930s ==
=== 1939 ===
- 28 December 1939 – Two freight train carriages derailed while making a shunting move at Leuwigoong halt. The derailment blocked the straight track, preventing trains from passing from Bandung. Evacuating the derailed carriages took at least 54 minutes.

== 1940s ==
=== 1944 ===
- 25 December 1944 – A passenger train derailed into the valley around Lembah Anai, Padang Panjang, West Sumatra. A total of 200 people were killed and 250 were seriously injured. This train accident in Lembah Anai is the worst train accident in Indonesia and number seven in the world, in history.

=== 1945 ===
- 23 March 1945 – Another train crashed at the Lembah Anai bridge, West Sumatra, possibly due to loss of brakes. Casualties were estimated to be in the hundreds.

== 1950s ==
=== 1954 ===
- 12 August 1954 – A freight train derailed on the section between Nagreg station - Lebakjero. This accident caused 3 people killed and 2 others to suffer serious injuries.

=== 1955 ===
- 12 May 1955 – At around 13:00, Tjepat 35 train with Yogyakarta-Bandung relation crashed at Manonjaya section, Ciamis, nearly Cirahong halte. This incident caused one locomotive to overturn and three trains to fall crosswise. This incident caused 39 people killed and 60 others seriously injured.

=== 1959 ===
- 28 May 1959 – At 07:30 am, the Tjepat 31 train with relation Banjar-Bandung train crashed and rolled over at km 242+5/6 of the Trowek (now Cirahayu)-Cipeundeuy section. There are 2 versions that mention the cause of this accident, 1. Because of the train's push after the train departed, 2. Someone suddenly disconnected the train. The train rolled until it toppled over. This incident resulted in 185 deaths and 200 injuries.

== 1960s ==
=== 1962 ===
- 24 September 1962 – A train suffered a brake failure and plummeted to the bottom of a ravine in the section between Trowek (now Cirahayu)-Cipeundeuy, not many references explain this accident, but recorded in a magazine, this accident also made the government issue a law on accident insurance funds. This incident resulted in 130 people killed.

=== 1965 ===
- 1965 – In 1965, Locomotive D52 065 derailed and overturned on the Cipeundeuy-Trowek stretch of road. The train derailed first, while the locomotive continued to slide down for about 1 km before derailing and overturning near the Gentong Ring Road. This incident occurred when the driver set the regulator to maximum while the train was climbing in Malangbong, Garut. This was done because the locomotive's power was deemed insufficient. The train was scheduled to stop at Cipeundeuy. Unfortunately, the regulator jammed and could not be returned to the zero position. As a result, the locomotive continued to accelerate, unable to brake due to its maximum power setting. The train ultimately derailed and overturned, with the locomotive positioned 1 km ahead of the train. Following this incident, D52s were banned from traveling on the Tasikmalaya-Bandung-Purwakarta route. As a result, D52s belonging to the Bandung Depot were relocated to other depots.

=== 1968 ===
- 11 April 1968 -At around 10:15 pm, the boiler of steam locomotive CC5002 exploded while stopping at Sukatani railway station, which at that time was still called Bendul. As a result, the main building of the station was badly damaged and claimed the lives of the machinist, train attendant, and a prospective assistant machinist as well as 3 other people who were at the scene. Meanwhile, the head of the station as well as PPKA also became victims. After the incident, the station had to be renovated and PNKA decided to rename the station to Sukatani.
- 20 September 1968 - At around 7:30 am there was a collision between Train 406 and Train 309 in the area of Ratu Jaya, Cipayung, Depok. This incident resulted in 116 people killed and 84 people injured. This accident is known as the Ratujaya 1968 train collision.

== 1970s ==
=== 1972 ===
- 6 June 1972 – A Perhutani pine wood transport train rolled over near Cukanghaur stop, on the Ciwidey-Soreang line. The accident killed the brakeman and the trader in the carriage.

=== 1973 ===
- 17 June 1973 – At around 19:50, Train 75 Pandanaran (with locomotive BB200 35) collided with Train 2620 (with locomotive CC200 01) which experienced engine failure. This incident occurred in line number 1 of Telawa Station emplacement, and caused 11 people dead and 2 locomotives heavily damaged.

=== 1974 ===
- 19 January 1974 – KA B5 South Pearl Train crashed into the rear of KA S3 Bima I at Soka Station, Kebumen,Central Java, starting with KA S3 stopping at Soka Station because its pulling locomotive was used to help KA 430 which had broken down on the highway. PPKA Soka Station at that time let the signal enter the safe position after serving KA S3, so KA B5 continued to move until it crashed into the rear of KA S3 which had stopped at the station yard. This accident resulted in one passenger suffering serious injuries and 33 others, as well as two employees of the State Railway Company (PJKA), suffering minor injuries.

=== 1976 ===
- 4 May 1976 – A freight train on the Kisaran-Medan route derailed in the Tebing Tinggi area. A total of 34 carriages derailed, consisting of 11 closed carriages and 23 boiler carriages. This incident was caused by the decay of the wooden bearings on the Wesel.

=== 1978 ===
- 17 March 1978 – Gaya Baru Malam Selatan train collided with an articulated truck at a railroad crossing on Jalan Perintis Kemerdekaan, Petarukan, Pemalang. As a result, the truck was thrown into a sugarcane field, Locomotive BB304 01 overturned, and several passenger cars derailed. The truck's assistant died and 5 others were injured.

=== 1979 ===
- 26 February 1979 – Train 22 Mutiara Timur crashed into a tapioca flour truck on the Sidoarjo - Probolinggo route that was shunting at Emplacement Sidoarjo Station. Locomotive BB301 07 as the puller of KA 22 and one unit of economy class train was slightly damaged and one unit of closed carriage was destroyed due to the impact from the locomotive of KA 22. There were no fatalities in this accident.
- 5 May 1979 – At 18:55 WIB, Bima train 2 crashed into bus Padi Kuning near Kadokangabus station. There were no fatalities in this incident.

== 1980s ==
=== 1980 ===
- 12 May 1980 – Bima II train collided with an Arimbi bus at the Ahmad Yani road crossing, Kroya Cilacap. As a result, the bus was dragged and destroyed, while CC201 11 locomotive pulling the Bima train derailed. A total of 21 bus passengers died and 60 others were injured.
- 5 December 1980 – Sriwijaya train derailed and overturned in Candi Mas Village, Kotabumi, North Lampung. This accident resulted in the deaths of eight passengers. The accident was caused by a rail slide and negligence of officers in checking the condition of the rail.

=== 1981 ===
- 21 January 1981 – At 03:32 am, the Senja IV train departing from Purwokerto Station and the Maja train departing from Kroya Station collided in the Gunung Payung area, near the Serayu River Bridge. After the collision, both CC 201 locomotives were scrapped in 1986 because it was not possible to revive them.
- 20 May 1981 – A Suryakencana train number PLB 8120 on the Jakarta - Cianjur route derailed on the section between Cibeber station - Lampegan due to braking problems. This accident caused 2 people to die and 22 people suffered minor injuries.
- 28 June 1981 – At around 05:55 am, train 41 Mutiara Timur crashed before entering Rogojampi station, East Java, one train was thrown into the Lugonto river and the other crashed off the tracks, this incident caused 11 people killed, 20 people seriously injured and 25 others slightly injured.

=== 1982 ===
- 7 November 1982 – KA 105 Cepat Semarang - Surabaya Pasar Turi collided with a truck loaded with wood at an unmarked crossing in Tandes, Surabaya. As a result, locomotive BB200 26 pulling KA 105 derailed about 100 meters from the collision site and hit a well and 2 people who were queuing to get water from the well, which resulted in one resident dying and another suffering minor injuries. Train traffic was also hampered for two days due to the evacuation crane's small lifting capacity, which delayed the evacuation process.

=== 1983 ===
- 30 May 1983 – At around 03.00 local time, Freight Train number 2112 derailed and plunged into a ravine at BH 858 Cimuncang Bridge, km 198+4/5 of the Lebakjero-Leles road section, Garut, West Java. Train 2112 was pulled by CC201 06 and CC201 15 with 15 carriages. While crossing the Cimuncang Bridge, ten carriages derailed, then plunged into the ravine below the bridge. As a result, five people died instantly, while 11 others were seriously injured. Three injured victims later died in the hospital, bringing the total number of victims to eight people who died and eight people who were seriously injured. All victims were PJKA employees.

=== 1986 ===
- 28 April 1986 – The head-on collision between trains KA21 Cepat Solo and KA28 Sawunggalih at Patuguran Station, Brebes, Central Java. A six people died.
- 7 November 1986 – Around 1:28 PM WIB, Mutiara Timur train derailed and overturned about one kilometer before entering Tanggul station, six carriages one Locomotive derailed and overturned. This incident resulted in three passengers suffering serious injuries and 29 passengers suffering minor injuries. After the incident, the train track was closed for two days.

=== 1987 ===
- 19 October 1987 – At around 6:45 am, Local 225 Rangkas train collided with oncoming 220 Cepat Merak train (head-to-head collision) in Pondok Betung area, Bintaro, Pesanggrahan, South Jakarta. The accident was caused by the mistake of the head of Kebayoran Station who dispatched the Train 220 without informing the head of Sudimara Station that the two trains crossed at Sudimara Station. The incident left 156 people dead and more than 300 injured. This incident is known as the Bintaro Tragedy I.

=== 1988 ===
- 6 July 1988 – At 01:45 WIB, train 14 Matarmaja train collided with train 33 Senja Utama Yogyakarta on track 1 Telagasari station due to train 14 violating the signal to enter Telagasari station which was positioned at the motto 7/unsafe. This accident resulted in 17 people being injured.
- 12 November 1988 – At around 04:00 WIB, train 800 was traveling Tanah Abang - Parung Panjang collided with KA 1031 Babarandek on the Cigading - Bekasi route in the section between Kebayoran Station - Sudimara Station, about 20 meters from the Kramat road crossing, Kebayoran Lama. There were no fatalities in this accident.

== 1990s ==
=== 1991 ===
- 27 September 1991 – KA 1081 crashed into KA 1200 which was shunting at yard Ceper Station, Klaten. The accident was caused by a braking problem on locomotive CC201 32 which was pulling KA 1081, so that KA 1081 violated the signal to enter Ceper Station which was at signal motto 7/unsafe. There were no casualties in this accident, but five employees of the state railway company (PJKA) were injured.

=== 1992 ===
- 25 March 1992 - An extraordinary event occurred in the Kebumen area in 1992, when a "KA Cepat" train from Yogyakarta to Bandung derailed and overturned near Soka Station in Kebumen, Central Java. The incident occurred when the high-speed train, carrying a damaged CC 201 02 locomotive, suffered a gearbox failure. There were no fatalities in the incident.
- 25 October 1992 – at least 50 train cars loaded with coal derailed when the Babaranjang train, number 2409, traveling from Baturaja, South Sumatra, to Tarahan Coal Port, Bandarlampung, collided with another Babaranjang train that was stopped at Cempaka Station, about 15 km from Kotabumi, North Lampung.

=== 1993 ===
- 24 July 1993 – at 3:55 a.m., the Jayabaya Selatan Train pulled by CC 201 101—collided with the Hasti Bus at the level crossing on Jalan Prof. Muh Yamin, located west of Jombang Station. The cause of this accident was because the level crossing gate did not close and the main cause was that the Crossing Guard Officer on duty at that time fell asleep on duty. As a result of this accident, 15 people died, including five marines, and 23 people were injured.
- 2 November 1993 – At 11:30 am, there was a collision between electric railroad trains in the Ratu Jaya area of Depok city, known as the 1993 Ratu Jaya train accident.

=== 1994 ===
- 20 May 1994 – At 02:23 WIB, the Tegal Arum train with its final destination Tegal Station collided with the Senja Ekonomi Solo–Jakarta train which was stopped to wait for crossing at Arjawinangun Station. The two locomotives involved, BB 203 25 and CC 201 30 (CC 201 78 02) suffered very severe damage. This incident also caused 10 people to die, 50 to be seriously injured, and 60 to be slightly injured.

=== 1995 ===
- 4 May 1995 – At around 03.47 WIB, KA 52 Mutiara Selatan with locomotive CC201 06 derailed and overturned at Madiun station due to KA 52 traveling too fast when entering the switch of track 1 Madiun station. This incident resulted in 7 people suffering minor injuries. After the incident, the train track on the southern line was completely closed for several days due to damage to the rail and the train blocking the track.
- 24 October 1995 – at 00:10, two combined Kahuripan and Galuh trains crashed in Kadipaten, Tasikmalaya, precisely in the Trowek area (now around Cirahayu Station). This incident caused the train to enter a ravine and two locomotives, CC 201 05 and CC 201 75R were badly damaged and had to undergo major repairs. which also claimed the death and injury victims were on the train that entered the ravine.
- 6 December 1995 – At 14:50 WIB, Fajar Utama Semarang train on the Gambir - Semarang Tawang route collided with a truck at the Madukoro road crossing, Semarang. The Fajar Utama Semarang train was traveling at high speed so that the truck was thrown into the river, which caused the CC201 104 locomotive and 2 passenger trains to overturn and hit 3 houses in the vicinity after 200 meters from the collision location. As a result of the accident, the driver and the truck conductor and one resident whose house was hit by the locomotive died.

=== 1996 ===
- 16 February 1996 – Badrasurya train with trip number 118 collided with a rice-laden truck in Gandrungmangu. As a result of the collision, locomotive CC201 18, which was pulling train 118 and an economy class carriage, overturned. There are very few references regarding this accident, so the number of victims or injured is not yet known.
- 25 May 1996 – Badrasurya train with trip number 118 which was supposed to crossing with the Bima train derailed and overturned due to going too fast when entering the switchyard on track 1 Curahmalang station. This accident caused the death of the assistant driver of KA 118.
- 4 November 1996 – the Merak Jaya train which was being tested at that time derailed and caused CC 201 Locomotive 107 to overturn at Palmerah station.

=== 1997 ===
- 14 January 1997 – At 04:30, three carriages of a fuel train—probably in a Kompas Daily pulled by locomotive BB301 22—overturned 800 meters west of Jombang Station after hitting an embankment. As a result, the fuel (consisting of diesel and premium) spilled and flowed into the Bokrantai River, where it then caught fire. A resident who was relieving in the river died, while the engine driver and assistant suffered burns. The journey of a number of trains was hampered by this incident.

=== 1998 ===
- 2 January 1998 – At around 23:15 WIB, two Babaranjang trains with the numbers BBR 20 and BBR 7 collided at the yard of Sulusuban station, Central Lampung. As a result of this accident, a conductor died, while eight other train crew members were injured. This accident also caused the CC201 85R locomotive that was pulling the BBR 20 train to stop operating due to severe damage, and the CC201 86R changed its cabin model to a wide cab like the CC203.
- 7 February 1998 – A two Parahyangan trains from opposite directions collided at Sadang Station, East Java. 52 passengers were injured.
- 24 July 1998 – A Container train with locomotive CC 201 06 hit a livestock train stopped on track 1 of Cikarang station. Container train was scheduled to pass directly on track 2 Cikarang Station, but allegedly due to sabotage, the switch still headed towards track 1 which caused the Container train to enter the same track as the Livestock train.

== 2000s ==
=== 2000 ===
- 18 April 2000 – There was a chain reaction accident between container train KA 2246, animal transport train KA 2002, and Argo Bromo train KA 5 near Kosambi Station. 3 stowaways on the animal transportation train were killed.
- 1 May 2000 – There was a goat fight accident between two local trains drawn by BB304 and BB306 on the section of road between Sudimara Station and Rawa Buntu Station. 5 passengers were killed.
- 28 June 2000 – A coal train derailed in Lembah Anai, West Sumatra. At that time many stowaways boarded the coal train, but the train lost control and rolled over until it fell into a ravine. This incident left 19 people dead and 20 others injured.
- 19 August 2000 – There was an accident between Coal Train 228 pulled by CC20176R and KRL 628 Hitachi on the plot between Kampung Bandan Station and Angke Station. This incident killed 3 people, two of whom were PT KAI officers.
- 14 December 2000 – Eight of 20 coal train carriages derailed and overturned near Lake Singkarak, West Sumatra, six of which overturned into Lake Singkarak. There were no fatalities in this accident.

=== 2001 ===
- 15 July 2001 – Eight people were killed and 25 others injured when the Babaranjang train collided with bus PO. Tasima in Prabumulih, South Sumatra. The fatal collision occurred at a railroad crossing in Peniwir Village, Prabumulih, about 100 meters from Kertapati Station, Palembang.
- 5 December 2001 – At 08.07, the Kahuripan train collided with train 2356 carrying cement and fertilizer which was shunting on track 1 Palur station. The accident was caused by the Kahuripan train violating the signal to enter Palur Station. There were no fatalities in this incident, and one passenger suffered minor injuries.
- 25 December 2001 – At around 4:33 a.m., Empu Jaya train with journey number 146 crashed into Gaya Baru Malam Selatan train with journey number 153 which was waiting to cross at track 3 emplacement of Ketanggungan Barat Station, Brebes, Central Java. The collision occurred because train 146 violated the red signal (a sign that the train must stop). This incident resulted in 31 people killed and 53 others seriously injured including the driver of Train 146.

=== 2002 ===
- 15 May 2002 – A 13 carriages of a freight train bound for Lubuk Linggau station carrying oil and cement derailed and overturned in the section between Bungamas station - Sukaraja. At the same time, residents began looting the oil spilled from the carriages, but were successfully intercepted by the authorities. This accident also caused the death of a brakeman who was crushed by the overturned carriage.
- 10 June 2002 – At around 11:45 a.m., locomotive BB 306 15 carrying 7 wagons of cement (KKW) collided with coal train number KA-2807 pulled by locomotive BB 204 10, carrying eight wagons of coal (KKBW) and pushing locomotive BB 306 14. The collision occurred at the Koto Luar crossing at kilometer 11+450 on the Pauh Lima-Indarung road.
- 12 November 2002 – The KA Lokal Merak economy train, pulled by locomotive BB 304 10, collided with a PO Primajasa bus with police number B 7764 BK and a city transport vehicle A 1928 SY at the railway crossing in Statomer, Gerem Village, Pulomerak District, Cilegon, West Java. At least four people died and dozens of others were injured as a result of this accident.
- 9 December 2002 – At 22:50 WIB, Argo Dwipangga train with Solo Balapan-Gambir route crashed in Sarwagadung-Mirit Village, Prembun, Kebumen, Central Java. In the accident, five train passengers were killed and dozens were injured. The cause of the accident was a rail that shifted due to a box truck that passed through the tunnel under the train track just before the Argo Dwipangga passed. This was the worst train accident during the Eid backflow in 2002.

=== 2003 ===
- 3 January 2003 – At 04:45, Bima train from Surabaya to Gambir crashed at km 312+8/9 emplacement of Bumiayu Station, Wesel no. 13A Plotted road between Kretek Station-Linggapura Lintas Kroya-Cirebon. There were no casualties.
- 21 April 2003 – At 2:25 pm, a long coal train (Babaranjang) B19 crashed at km 8+470, road section between Tanjungkarang-Tarahan Station, Sumur Putri Village, Garuntang District, Bandar Lampung. There were no casualties.
- 14 May 2003 At 12:40, Sancaka train line from Surabaya to Yogyakarta crashed at km 204. There were no casualties.
- 30 May 2003 – At 09:27, train 122 Fajar Utama Semarang crashed at km 156+0/3 emplacement of Kedokangabus Station. There were no casualties.
- 30 July 2003 – At 00.35, train 1404 carrying Pertamina fuel oil (BBM) with a total train weight of 855 tons crashed and several cars rolled over. There were no casualties.
- 1 August 2003 – At 09:40, train 84 Kamandanu on the Gambir-Semarang Tawang route crashed at km 52+600 to 53+100 between Lemahabang Station and Kedunggedeh, East Cikarang District, Bekasi Regency, West Java. A total of 6 passengers were seriously injured and 12 passengers suffered minor injuries.
- 4 October 2003 – A KRL Holec KL3-97242F serving KA 490 (Economy) bound for Bogor crashed into the tail of KA 488 served by KRL Holec KL3-94212F on the road between Cilebut station and Bogor station. 39 passengers were injured.
- 27 October 2003 – At 12:05, Argo Bromo Anggrek train on Surbaya Pasar Turi-Gambir route crashed at km 38+420 on the road between Karangjati-Gubug station, Grobogan regency, Central Java.

=== 2004 ===
- 25 March 2004 – The Kertajaya train derailed and overturned due to sudden braking to avoid a collision with another train at Benowo Station, Surabaya, East Java. One people died and dozens injuries.

=== 2005 ===
- 19 May 2005 – Fajar Utama Ekspres Lampung train pulled by locomotive CC201 121R crashed into Babaranjang train. Four people died and locomotive CC201 121R was retired.
- 6 July 2005 – At around 14.45 WIB, two Bukit Serelo trains with numbers S7 and S8 collided at Banjarsari station. Initially, at 14.00, the S7 train with locomotive CC201 bound for Lubuk Linggau station stopped at the station yard to wait to cross and exchange locomotives with the S8 train pulled by locomotive BB203 bound for Kertapati station. After 45 minutes, the S8 train arrived and should have stopped at the entry signal which was in an unsafe position, but the train instead continued to move until it hit the S7 train, causing one of the S7 trains to derail by 2 axles. There were no fatalities in this accident, but 25 people were injured.
- 10 August 2005 – A long-distance coal train (Babaranjang) with number BBR 20 collided with a PMH bus with number 471 at the KM 6 crossing in East Kemelak, Baturaja, Lampung. 10 passengers were killed and 37 others injured.

=== 2006 ===
- 14 April 2006 – At 02:15 in the morning in Grobogan. Kertajaya train with driver Nurhadi collided with Sembrani train with driver Muhadi. A total of 14 people were killed. It all started when the Kertajaya train entered Gubug Station from Jakarta. At that time, Kertajaya entered on Line 1. Gumarang train then entered Gubug Station on line 2. After Gumarang passed, as if impatient, Kertajaya train moved out of the station and entered line 2. In fact, at that time Kertajaya train had not been given the signal to go. When Kertajaya train entered track 2, suddenly Sembrani train with driver Muhadi came from Jakarta at high speed, and a violent collision was inevitable. Both locomotives that collided, CC 201 135R (Kertajaya train) and CC 203 39 (Sembrani train) were severely damaged and almost shapeless, the CC 201 135R locomotive was then transferred to Sumatra in 2007.
- 14 April 2006 – At 05:40, there was a collision between CPO boiler trains at Perbaungan Station, this incident caused the Divre 1 cross line to be paralyzed for two days. Two people were killed and three others were seriously injured.
- 18 April 2006 – KRL Pakuan Ekspres majoring in Jakarta-Bogor crashed into Metromini S-64 majoring in Pasar Minggu-Cililitan. Five people died on the spot, one died at the hospital, while one other person is still in critical condition. The incident occurred when the Metromini was about to pass the Duren Kalibata railroad crossing, South Jakarta, under the Kalibata overpass at around 3pm. According to an eyewitness, the accident occurred because the Metromini was held up because right in front of it there was another transportation that was stopped. Although the driver had honked repeatedly for the other transportation to move forward, it was ignored.
- 1 November 2006 – Parahyangan executive train, Bandung-Jakarta route, crashed in Babakan Village, Tanjungpura, Karawang. There were no victims.
- 11 December 2006 – Mutiara Timur train, route Surabaya-Banyuwangi, crashed in Randuagung village, Lumajang, East Java. There were no casualties.
- 13 December 2006 – Sawunggalih executive train, Kutoarjo-Jakarta route, crashed in Karangsari, Cilongok, Banyumas, Central Java. There were no casualties.

=== 2007 ===
- 2 January 2007 – A commuter train 241 on the Jakarta-Bojong Gede route crashed on line 10 of Jakarta Kota Station, West Jakarta. There were no victims.
- 16 January 2007 – In the early hours of the morning, a Bengawan train carrying Solo-Tanahabang route broke down in Cilongok District, Banyumas Regency, Central Java. Five passengers were reported dead, hundreds were injured as a result of this incident. Of the five dead, three of them have been identified. Bengawan train was carrying 12 cars, car 4 fell into the river, while cars 5 to 12 tilted on the tracks.
- 29 January 2007 – Bengawan economy train, Solo-Jakarta route, crashed at Bangoduwa Station, Klangenan, Cirebon, West Java. There were no casualties.
- 31 January 2007 – Sancaka business train, Surabaya-Yogyakarta route, crashed in Nganjuk, East Java. There were no casualties.
- 2 February 2007 – At 08.20 am, Sribilah train collided with a freight train, at the exit track of Rantau Prapat Station, North Sumatra. The initial suspicion was that the cause of the collision was due to the officer neglecting to move the railroad tracks in and out of the train. The collision resulted in 9 serious injuries and 26 minor injuries.
- 6 February 2007 – At 12:20 pm. Putri Hijau train rolled over near Teluk Mengkudu railway station, due to sabotage of telephone installation using stone slabs, but the stone was shifted and covered the train track. This incident caused the locomotive and 2 economic series to roll over, there were no casualties but the injured reached dozens of people, and this incident caused the Divre 1 Line to be completely paralyzed for one day.
- 25 March 2007 – At 10:00 a.m., Rapih Dhoho train, Blitar-Surabaya route, crashed into a double truck loaded with fertilizer in Sumbergarum village, Garum sub-district, Blitar district, 1.5 km from Garum station. The accident site is known to have no railroad crossing gates. There were no casualties from this accident but it paralyzed train traffic on the local line.
- 26 March 2007 – At 15:27 pm, Mutiara Timur train from Banyuwangi with the destination Surabaya, hit three cars and one motorcycle. The train doors were not closed and the siren was not sounded. As a result, three people died and five others were injured.
- 3 April 2007 – the Argo Dwipangga train derailed at km 342+500, Babakan, Karanglewas, Banyumas which resulted in the train journey being hampered.
- 7 April 2007 – At 03.10, Tawang Jaya train from Jakarta to Semarang crashed in Surodadi, Tegal regency, Central Java causing the death of an 8-month-old baby, while 14 other passengers were injured.
- 21 April 2007 – At 03.25, Serayu (train), Senen-Kroya route, crashed in Cilengkrang, Cibatu, Garut, West Java. A total of three carriages fell into a 30-meter deep ravine on the edge of the train tracks. 40 people were injured and six others were seriously injured.
- 21 April 2007 – At 12:15, Argo Lawu train from Solo to Gambir crashed in Purwokerto area. There were no casualties.
- 5 August 2007 – a train loaded with cement majoring Indarung-Teluk Bayur rolled over in Kampung Juar area of Padang, West Sumatra. 14 out of 20 crashed and rolled over, There were no casualties in the incident, the cause of which is not yet known.
- 12 August 2007 – the Gumarang train majoring in Surabaya-Jakarta at Kramat hamlet, Mangunsari village, Tegowanu sub-district, Grobogan district, crashed. Dozens of people were injured. The accident was allegedly caused by an act of sabotage by certain parties. This suspicion is corroborated by the fact that one of the rail sections was cut with a five-meter-long saw and the locking bolt was removed. However, the rail was not taken away, but left in place.
- 17 August 2007 – at 4:05 pm; a freight train carrying 20 container gates from Surabaya to Jakarta crashed at Plabuan Station, Batang regency, Central Java.
- 27 December 2007 – A KA 2375 pulp train owned by PT. Tanjung Enim Lestari derailed and overturned in Bandar Lampung, Lampung due to going too fast when going through a bend. This accident caused one locomotive to be severely damaged, 24 carriages to be damaged, 17 houses to be damaged, and eight residents to be injured.

=== 2008 ===
- 4 July 2008 – Two trains collided on track two of Sengon Station, Purwosari, Pasuruan, East Java. The collision occurred because locomotive BB301 21 without cars coming down from Malang had malfunctioning brakes. As a result, the locomotive, run by driver Harianto, could not stop on track 2 of Sengon Station. At the same time, the fuel train pulled by locomotive CC 203 27 from Bangil, run by driver Katnadi, also entered track 2. As a result, the collision was unavoidable. As a result of the head-on collision, both locomotives suffered serious damage. Both faces of the locomotives were damaged, including a series of fuel cars. Because the position of the collision was right above the crossing line, all train trips from Surabaya to Malang via Bangil, or vice versa, were delayed.
- 16 August 2008 – at least eight people died in a collision between the Limex Sriwijaya train and the Babaranjang coal train in the Pelabuhan Ratu area of Bandar Lampung.
- 30 October 2008 – A train 421 Economy AC served by ex-Toei 6000 train 6181F was overtaken by train 1001 Antaboga behind WTC Mangga Dua, just a few hundred meters before Kampung Bandan Station. This incident was caused by the 1001 train driver who violated the entry signal and hit the slow-moving KA 421.
- 22 December 2008 – At 16:30 pm. Putri deli train crashed before entering Medan Station as a result of broken rail pads, this resulted in 2 trains and the locomotive being overturned, and two people were injured.

=== 2009 ===
- 23 January 2009 – Antaboga container train was hit by Rajawali train at high speed at Kapas Station, Bojonegoro. This was caused by the PPKA not moving the switch to the empty second track. From the incident, it was recorded that the driver of the Antaboga container train and his assistant were killed in the wrecked locomotive.
- 23 February 2009 – at 15.02 WIB, KA 950 Rapih Dhoho had an accident with a PO Harapan Jaya bus on Jl. Brigjen Katamso, Kediri City, located approximately 2 km south of Kediri Station. The incident occurred because the bus driver was driving recklessly, and the PJL who was on duty at that time was late in closing the crossing gate due to heavy rain so that visibility was limited. This incident resulted in 9 people being killed and 25 others injured.
- 18 April 2009 – At 02:30 WIB, an extraordinary train (KLB) of rail transport and rail sleepers derailed and overturned at KM 184+23 between Cicalengka Station - Nagreg. As a result of this accident, the engineer and assistant engineer suffered minor injuries. The CC201 locomotive 95 that was pulling the KLB rail was severely damaged and its cabin was destroyed, so it had to undergo repairs at the Yogyakarta Yasa Center.
- 5 June 2009 – a KRL hit a fellow KRL near Manggarai Station. Travel was hampered by a temporary power outage until the situation was restored.
- 4 August 2009 – at 10:28 a.m., train 221 Pakuan Ekspres crashed into train 549 Ekonomi which broke down at Pondok Rumput, Tanah Sareal about 2 km from Bogor Station. As a result of this incident Pakuan Ekspres technician died and dozens of passengers were injured. The two trains involved, Toei electric rail train 6000 series 6151F and BN-Holec electric rail train KL3-97234 were severely damaged.
- 4 September 2009 – A locomotive CC201 44 pulling Penataran train rolled over after hitting a buffalo owned by herder Rasim, in Singosari, Malang, East Java. The driver was killed, while 5 passengers were slightly injured and one passenger was seriously injured. As a result, PT KA Daop VIII Surabaya charged Rasim as a suspect, as well as 10 billion in damages for the incident.

== 2010s ==
=== 2010 ===
- 29 June 2010 – The Logawa train crashed and rolled over in Petung hamlet, Pajaran, Saradan, Madiun, East Java, about one kilometer from the Madiun-Nganjuk border. Six passengers were crushed to death. It is suspected that the train rolled over due to its high speed while traveling on a turning track.
- 8 September 2010 – at 13:00 WIB, there was a collision between Sribilah train and CPO freight train in North Sumatra, this happened because Sribilah had not fully entered the wesel which caused the CPO train to hit the final train of Sribilah train, there were no casualties in this event, but caused almost all trips that day to be canceled due to the overturned and downed locomotive that covered the railroad track.
- 2 October 2010 – Petarukan train collision – At 02.45 am, occurred between train 4 Argo Bromo Anggrek and train 116 Senja Utama Semarang, which were waiting for a crossing at Petarukan Station, Pemalang, Central Java. Train 116 Senja Utama Semarang entered track 3 to cross train 101 Senja Kediri and was followed by train 4 Argo Bromo Anggrek. While waiting to be overtaken, KA 116 was suddenly hit from behind by KA 4 which violated the entry signal. The death toll reached 36 and dozens were injured. The crew of Train 4 violated the signal because they were later found to be experiencing microsleep.
- 2 October 2010 – at 3 a.m., a train collision also occurred at Purwosari Station, where train 34 Bima grazed the rearmost train of train 144 Gaya Baru Malam Selatan which stopped at Purwosari Station. Gaya Baru Malam Selatan train entered track 1 to be followed by Bima train, but the rearmost train of Gaya Baru Malam Selatan train did not fully enter track 1, which made the straight line blocked by GBMS train. As a result, Bima train grazed the rear set of Gaya Baru Malam Selatan train and caused one passenger dead and 4 people injured. The mistake of PPKA Purwosari Station was the cause of this accident.
- 9 November 2010 – Cirebon Ekspres train 60, Gambir-Cirebon relation, crashed at Telagasari Station, Indramayu, West Java. There were no casualties in the incident, but the train schedule through the North Java route was delayed.
- 28 November 2010 – A train 1 Argo Bromo Anggrek from Surabaya Pasarturi Station to Gambir with locomotive number CC203 21 crashed into a truck with police number S 8584 C in Kebonsari Village, Sukodadi District, Lamongan, East Java. The three victims were truck passengers Sunaji (35), Mulyadi (35) and Sutrisno (32) the truck driver, all residents of Cendoro Village, Palang, Tuban, East Java. The accident occurred at around 09.00 am. At that time the truck loaded with barn stones was traveling from the east (Surabaya). Arriving at the scene, the truck turned left onto the railroad track.

=== 2011 ===
- 28 January 2011 – there was a collision between Mutiara Selatan train to Bandung and Kutojaya Selatan train to Kutoarjo, which was waiting to cross with Mutiara Selatan train at Langen Station, Banjar regency, West Java. However, Mutiara Selatan train broke the signal and went straight into track 3. The collision was inevitable, both locomotives, CC201 62 and CC203 11 were damaged on the front.
- 4 January 2011 – at around 1:15 pm, Gajayana train was running without locomotive from Malang Station. The train then broke the safety wall and crashed into three houses. This accident resulted in the death of one child and the injury of another.

=== 2012 ===
- 19 February 2012 – there was a collision between Babaranjang Train to Tanjung Enim and Kertapati Station coal train to Sukacinta Station, South Sumatra. 4 people died on the spot, 2 locomotives, namely CC202 16 and CC201 83R were wrecked and burned. As a result of this accident, four victims died instantly due to entrapment and this accident resulted in PT KAI losing both locomotives due to retirement.
- 22 March 2012 – A locomotive CC 201 98 (CC 201 92 08) which had been transferred to South Sumatra, had an accident while pulling Barapati train in Prabumulih, caught fire and could no longer be operated.
- 4 October 2012 – Commuter Line 435 to Jakarta Kota Station derailed at Cilebut Station, the station platform was damaged due to being hit by train 3. As a result of this incident, the Commuter Line travel schedule only reached Bojong Gede Station and Bogor Station was closed because the train could not pass.
- 26 November 2012 – near JPL 41 Pejompongan a KRL commuter heading to Tanah Abang crashed with a passenger car. This incident sparked renewed debates about the safety of manual gates and the need for a flyover or underpass.

=== 2013 ===
- On 9 December 2013 – a Commuter Line train with the TM 7021F series crashed into a Pertamina tanker truck carrying 24,000 liters of premium fuel at the Bintaro railway crossing in South Jakarta. This accident occurred allegedly because the doorstop was not functioning. KRL Commuter Line majoring Serpong-Tanah Abang Station number 1131 departed from Serpong at around 11:01 am, but was slightly late due to air conditioning repairs. After that, it departed for Pondok Ranji. that's where the mistake began to occur. The tanker truck passed through the crossing, not far away the KRL came. The officer immediately raised the red flag. The KRL could not brake suddenly and finally at 11.25 there was a collision. At around 11:30, there were three explosions. This incident is known as the 2013 Bintaro train crash.

=== 2014 ===
- 3 January 2014 – At 2:05 p.m., train 7118 Pangrango with Bogor Paledang Station to Sukabumi Station connection crashed at Pamoyanan Bridge in Cicurug, Sukabumi, West Java due to a broken rail. There were no casualties in this incident. One dining car that was in the last train almost rolled over due to stepping on the broken rail. Finally, the dining car was released and left from the train and the train returned to running without electricity & restoration facilities. Rail repairs were completed at 21:25, by repairing the broken sleepers and the next day trains were able to return to normal traffic.
- 23 January 2014 – Senja Utama Solo train hit a student of SMA Negeri 1 Gamping at a level crossing in Gamping, Sleman, Yogyakarta precisely in Banyuraden village. It is said that when the crossing bar was closed, the Prambanan Ekspres train passed by. However, just after the crossbar opened, Senja Utama train suddenly came from the west. It is known that there was an error in the semi-automatic crossing. As a result, four people died, namely Gitri Yudha Widada (17), a resident of Balecatur Sleman, Latifah Sylfia Erpriliani (16), a resident of Godean, Sleman, both students of SMAN 1 Gamping, and Sumardi (57), a resident of Kanoman Gamping and Suparwanto (41).
- 10 February 2014 – Two Siliwangi trains traveling from Cianjur Station to Sukabumi Station crashed at around 1:30 pm near Lampegan tunnel, Cianjur, precisely at Lampegan Station – Cireungas Station. The body of one of the carriages hit the Lampegan tunnel when it derailed, but did not damage the tunnel construction.
- 8 March 2014 – A tour bus PO Haryanto with license plate number B 7036 PGA, which was carrying a group of children for a charity activity, was hit by a Menoreh train while passing through an illegal crossing between Cikarang and Tambun Stations. As a result, the locomotive was damaged and the lights were broken. However, the bus driver managed to escape and his kernet was secured.
- 4 April 2014 – Tasikmalaya derailment – A Malabar train rolled over around Tasikmalaya area, West Java between Ciawi-Cirahayu Station section at km 244. To date, four victims have been reported dead, two others are still pinned between the overturned train. The Malabar train rolled over due to a landslide. It is rumored that this train rolled into a ravine. The victims of the accident were taken to the Ciawi Health Center. This incident occurred at around 6:30 p.m.
- 4 May 2014 – Bogowonto train and its power train (P 0 08 01) pulled by CC206 rolled over after hitting a container truck in Cirebon, West Java. There were no fatalities, but the driver and several passengers were injured. This incident caused the train schedule to be delayed and evacuation was difficult due to the heavy weight of CC206.

=== 2015 ===
- 23 May 2015 – At 6:50 pm, Bangunkarta train bound for Surabaya Gubeng Station nudged KA 2502 transporting large pipes at Waruduwur Station, Cirebon Operation Area III, causing one generator train, two executive passenger trains, and locomotive number CC206 13 23 belonging to Purwokerto Locomotive Depot to derail. The derailment occurred at the switch, then the locomotive blocked, hitting freight train KA 2502 Gas Pipe which was stopped on track 4 because the rearmost car had not passed the free section limit. At the same time, a cement train was stopping on track 1. One of the guards of freight train 2502 carrying the pipes suffered serious injuries to his broken leg and was hospitalized at Ciremai Hospital, Cirebon, West Java. Meanwhile, the other one was discharged.
- 15 June 2015 – A coal train (Babaranjang train) with train number 3029 crashed into the rearmost carriage of train 3027 which was being held by the Metur Station, South Sumatra entry signal. As a result of the collision, two cars of KA 3027 (serial numbers 46 and 47) that were hit by the locomotive of KA 3029 were destroyed and went up to the top of car number 45, as well as two locomotives of KA 3029 (CC 205 13 41 and EMD GT38ACeCC 205 13 10) which suffered minor physical damage, but suffered heavy damage in the computer system. The locomotives involved in the accident were sent to Balai Yasa Lahat for repairs and were back in service in 2019.
- 23 September 2015 – at 3:25 pm, there was an accident involving two KRL JR 205 SF 10 (series 205-54F and 205-123F) at Juanda Station. The condition of the two JR 205 KRL cabins (KuHa 204 / 205) was heavily damaged. The condition of train numbers 1–9 in both trains also suffered heavy damage, especially in the connection section, which was also heavily damaged and crushed. 42 people were injured as a result of the accident. This incident resulted in the driver of KRL 1156, Gustian, being seriously injured and had to be referred to Gatot Soebroto Army Central Hospital, Central Jakarta.
- 6 October 2015 – Babaranjang train with train number 3026 crashed into the rearmost carriage of train 3024 which was stopped at Negeri Agung Station, South Sumatra. There were no casualties, but due to the collision, the train 3024 which was hit by Locomotive KA 3026 was damaged and plummeted by 17 axles, as well as two Locomotives KA 3026 (CC 205 13 15 and CC 205 13 26) and 2 (two) cars behind it plummeted by 20 axles as well as damage to railroad components at this station. The evacuation process of the two train sets was completed at 19:22 WIB on 7 October 2015 and caused all train trips to be canceled. The locomotive involved in this accident was so heavily damaged that it had to be sent to Progress Rail in 2018, and has returned to Lampung in 2020. As of 4 May 2021, this locomotive has returned to regular operation.
- 6 December 2015 – There was an accident involving KRL 1528/JR 205 and MetroMini with police number B 7760 FD in Angke area, Tambora, West Jakarta, near Angke station, due to MetroMini crossing the level crossing. Thirteen MetroMini passengers were killed in the incident, but there were no casualties from KRL Commuter Line passengers, according to Eva Chairunnisa, corporate communications of PT KCJ. Traffic passing through the level crossing was then diverted through the flyover located above this level crossing. However, the death toll of this accident increased to 18 people.
- 15 December 2015 – Sri Lelawangsa train crashed into a sepur badug after a test run at Medan Station. There were no fatalities in this incident.

=== 2016 ===
- 11 January 2016 – Pasundan train hit a truck loaded with sand at the level crossing km 369+7/8, Kubangkangkung, Kawunganten, Cilacap, Central Java. This accident did not cause any casualties but the Pasundan train was held at the scene for about 2.5 hours because it was waiting for the evacuation process of the truck that was stuck in the train door and the slipping process.
- 19 May 2016 – At 04.23 there was an accident where Senja Utama Solo train crashed into a Toyota Avanza car and Transjakarta bus at Gunung Sahari crossing line (JPL), North Jakarta. It is suspected that this accident occurred because the Gunung Sahari JPL officer was late in closing the railroad crossing doorstop.

=== 2017 ===
- 23 April 2017 – at 05.00 am, there was an accident of KA 90 crashing into a car at Jemursari Crossing, 3 people died and were treated at Dr. Soetomo Hospital and Bhayangkara East Java Police Hospital, Surabaya. As a result, PJL 21 near Margorejo bus stop was closed.
- 20 May 2017 – at 10:30 a.m., Argo Bromo Anggrek train (KA 1) bound for Gambir Station crashed into a Toyota Avanza Minibus at an unbarred crossing, 500 meters from Sedadi Station, Grobogan, Central Java. The front outer part of the locomotive with number CC206 13 92 owned by Locomotive Depot caught fire due to the minibus fire, and the minibus was dragged to Sedadi Station. 4 people in the minibus were killed, while Argo Anggrek's journey was hampered as it waited for a relief locomotive (CC 206 13 66 SMC) to arrive from Semarang Poncol Locomotive Depot.
- 21 May 2017 – at 9:52 pm, KA 3 Argo Bromo Anggrek bound for Gambir Station hit a pickup truck with police number K 1804 MN at the crossing in Randublatung sub-district, Blora, Central Java. Locomotive CC 206 13 69 owned by Yogyakarta Locomotive Depot was damaged at the front, and the pickup truck was wrecked on the spot. There were no casualties, but the driver of the car ran away, and the train continued its journey 2 minutes later to Semarang Tawang Station for locomotive replacement by CC 201 83 24 (CC 201 62) owned by Purwokerto Main Depot.
- 20 June 2017 – At 12:28 WIB, KA 3029B Babaranjang hit the inspection truck and the locomotive of the post CC202 90 14 TNK on track I Ketapang station, North Lampung. The cause of the accident is suspected to be due to the operation of signaling equipment carried out by the PPKA Ketapang station not in accordance with applicable procedures, causing KA 3029B to enter track I. This accident caused one person in the lorry to die.
- 31 August 2017 – A car crashed into Bogowonto train at Cakung Station, but there was no police number, most likely there were victims.

=== 2018 ===
- 27 February 2018 – the stairs of a Minangkabau Ekspres train nudged the end of the platform at Air Tawar Station, West Sumatra. This incident caused the train's trial trip to be disrupted because it had to stop for a long time at this station.
- 6 April 2018 – Sancaka train with train number KA 86 crashed due to being hit by a trailer truck carrying concrete at km 215+8 crossing Sambirejo, Mantingan, Ngawi, East Java. As a result of this accident, the driver of KA 86 died and the assistant driver was in a coma. The damage in this accident made Locomotive CC201 with series CC201 83 49 belonging to Sidotopo Main Depot with conservation status, three Executive class trains and one Generator train plummeted and damaged.
- 20 August 2018 – Bangunkarta train from Surabaya hit a car in Bulak Kapal area, Bekasi, West Java. The incident began when a car was about to cross the unbarred level crossing, when it was about to cross the driver was stopped by a witness who was guarding the crossing, but the victim continued to pass through and the car experienced engine failure, shortly thereafter the Bangunkarta train traveling from Jakarta hit the car. The train stopped after hitting the car, then a Taksaka train traveling from the east also hit the car. In this incident, the driver of the car died.

=== 2019 ===
- 10 March 2019 – Tokyu 8512F serving as KRL 1721/1722 on Jatinegara-Kampung Bandan-Bogor route crashed at Cilebut-Bogor section in Kebon Pedes area, Bogor, West Java. This accident caused the MC2 train (8612) to fall and hit the LAA pole until it was dented on the right front. Four train units involved in the accident were declared retired (afkir), while four other train units survived and were donated to KRL Tokyu 8510F. During the evacuation process, the overhead electricity on the railway line had to be turned off.
- 4 June 2019 – Serayu train with trip number 215 crashed at km. 193 Lebakjero-Nagreg section, Garut, West Java. There were no casualties in the incident, but a number of other train trips were delayed by several hours. Some trains even had to detour through Cirebon.
- 25 August 2019 – the Argo Dwipangga train hit a truck at km 463+4/5 between Kutowinangun Station and Prembun Station resulting in the death of the truck driver and one other person being injured.
- 12 December 2019 – At 11:18 WIB, 11 of the 20 carriages of KA 2704 Ketapang Service carrying 800 tons of cement derailed and rolled over at the yard Doplang station, Blora Regency. The accident is suspected to have been caused by problems with the bogie and braking components on carriages GD 42 13 55. There were no fatalities in this accident.
- 16 December 2019 – precisely at km 6, the Tebing Tinggi-Naga Kasiangan, North Sumatra plot was hit by floods and landslides, which caused Locomotive CC 201 89 14R to fall off the tracks. This incident caused train trips to and from Siantar to be canceled.

== 2020s ==
=== 2020 ===
- 21 January 2020 – The Tawang Jaya train with trip number KA 329 crashed at a level crossing in the Pondok Jati area, Matraman, East Jakarta. There were no casualties in the incident, but a number of KRL Commuter Line electric train trips were disrupted.
- 25 February 2020 – At 14:28 WIB, a commuter train with trip number KRL 1118 Jakarta Kota-Bogor crashed at Jayakarta Station. There were no casualties from the incident.
- 2 October 2020 – the locomotive of Serayu Pagi train with trip number KA322 Purwokerto-Pasar Senen route crashed in Ciamis, West Java. The derailment occurred at kilometer 285+01 between Manonjaya Station and Ciamis Station at 17:30 local time. This incident resulted in the train being unable to continue its journey. A relief train and Kirow crane from Bandung were dispatched to evacuate the derailed locomotive. Serayu Pagi train passengers were then escorted to Banjar Station by bus to continue their journey using a replacement train. As a result of this derailment, the Turangga train with trip number KA 78 to Surabaya Gubeng had to be diverted through Cirebon.
- 30 October 2020 – a commuter train with trip number KRL 1481 on the Bekasi-Jakarta Kota route via Senen crashed at Kampung Bandan Station. The incident resulted in train travel from Bogor to Jatinegara only until Angke Station. For Bekasi-Kota train travel via Pasar Senen only until Kemayoran Station. Meanwhile, train trips from Jatinegara to Bogor are diverted into Jatinegara-Manggarai-Bogor relations.
- 30 October 2020 – The JR East 205 KRL train that was being sent to Klaten, Central Java was damaged after its roof grazed the top of the Kalioso Bridge which is lower than the KRL roof. As a result, the train's pantograph was destroyed and the train's air conditioning was severely damaged. There were AC panels stuck on the Kalioso Bridge after the incident. Nonetheless, the train underwent repairs upon arrival in Klaten before serving as the Yogyakarta-Solo electric railroad.
- 18 November 2020 – At around 2:30 p.m., the Gajayana train along with seven spare train units ran without a locomotive from Malang Station to Malang Kotalama Station. The train derailed after hitting an excavator because Malang Kotalama Station was undergoing rail repairs. This incident resulted in four trains being damaged. There were no casualties in this incident.
- 13 December 2020 – At 22.45 WIB, the Brantas train crashed into a police patrol car belonging to Kalijambe Police Station containing two police officers and one TNI Koramil Kalijambe at the crossing without a doorstop Dukuh Siboto RT 11/02, Kalimacan Village, Kalijambe, Sragen, Central Java, ahead of Kalioso Station. This incident resulted in the death of 3 officers.

=== 2021 ===
- 12 November 2021 – PT TEL's pulp-carrying freight train crashed while passing on line 2 of Peninjawan Station, South Sumatra. There were no casualties from this incident, but train travel on this line was disrupted for 14 hours and resulted in damage to the station's line 3 switch. The cars that fell were car 13 (GT501811), car 14 (GT500022), car 15 (GT500081), car 16 (GT500048), one rail maintenance machine (CSM 09–16–3528) and one caboose or rest area number (SN 001–01) that was parked on line 1.
- 4 December 2021 – the Sri Lelawangsa train crashed into an angkot at the Jalan Sekip crossing, Medan, North Sumatra. This incident resulted in five people dead and four people injured.
- 11 December 2021 -Two long coal trains, namely KA 3061 pulled by locomotives CC 205 14 04 and CC 205 21 04, crashed into the rearmost carriage of KA 3055 which was stopped at the emplacement of Penanggiran Station, South Sumatra. As a result, eight open cars of KA 3055 as well as the locomotive and 2 open cars of KA 3061 plummeted 40 axles and rolled over. There were no casualties in this incident, but this accident made the trips of two passenger trains, namely Serelo and Sindang Marga trains, also canceled.

=== 2022 ===
- 27 February 2022 – Dhoho train with Blitar-Kertosono relation crashed into Harapan Jaya bus at a crossing without a doorstop in the plot between Tulungagung-Ngujang, Kedungwaru, Tulungagung, East Java. In this incident, the driver and passengers became victims. Six passengers were killed and 14 others were injured.
- 29 March 2022 – at 14.40 WIB, Sibinuang train on the Padang - Naras route with trip number B6 hit a cement-laden truck with number BA 9894 LU at the crossing without a barrier KM 23+054 on the side of the Adinegoro road in the section between the Lubuk Buaya - Duku stations, Padang Sarai, Koto Tangah, Padang, West Sumatra. As a result of the incident, the truck that was dragged hit and knocked down a billboard, hitting a Daihatsu Gran Max car near the scene of the incident, and Adinegoro Street experienced a traffic jam.
- 21 June 2022 – at 10:55 WIB, Argo Sindoro train (PLB KA 11) Semarang Tawang-Gambir relation crashed into a Toyota Avanza car at a level crossing between Tambun-Cibitung Station, South Tambun, Bekasi, West Java. Unfortunately, the car was dragged for about 1.2 km before entering Tambun Station, and the car driver died.
- 26 July 2022 – 2022 Serang train crash – KA Lokal Merak to Rangkasbitung crashed into an the Odong-odong at a crossing without a crossbar near the former Silebu Bus Stop, Kragilan, Serang, Banten. The Odong-odong was carrying 34 passengers, 9 passengers were killed and 24 others and the driver were injured.
- 4 October 2022 – the last eleven carriages of the KA Babaranjang numbered KA 3028 pulled by locomotives CC 205 21 02 and CC 205 21 34 derailed while passing on track 1 of this station which was under repair. As a result, 8 open carriages derailed 22 axles and 4 open carriages overturned 16 axles. There were no fatalities or disruption to train operations in this incident.
- 7 November 2022 – The two Babaranjang trains, namely KA 3056A pulled by locomotives CC 205 21 20 and EMD GT38ACeCC 205 13 16 collided with KA 3031A pulled by locomotives CC 205 13 37 and CC 205 13 33 which were stopped on track 1 of the Rengas Station emplacement, Lampung. As a result, the four colliding locomotives were severely damaged, 2 open cars of KA 3031A and 2 of KA 3056A plummeted and 8 open cars of KA 3056A rolled 32 axles. There were no casualties in this incident, but this accident made all train trips canceled.
- 26 November 2022 – KA D1/5144C Commuter Line route Kampung Bandan - Manggarai derailed at KM 1+603.5 track 2 Kampung Bandan Station until it knocked down an overhead power pole. There were no fatalities in this incident.

=== 2023 ===
- 30 March 2023 – Turangga train (KA 80) on the Bandung-Surabaya Gubeng route with locomotive CC 206 13 99 BD crashed into an animal feed truck at the crossing between Jombang Station and Sembung Station in Diwek, Jombang, East Java. The cause of the accident was caused by the truck breaking down at the crossing. As a result, locomotive CC 206 13 99 BD was wrecked, and there were no casualties. However, train traffic on the Madiun-Surabaya corridor from the southern and central lines of Java was disrupted as a result of the incident.
- 18 April 2023 – A Jayabaya train with Pasar Senen-Surabaya Pasarturi-Malang relation crashed into a sedan with police number S 1649 PK on the Surabayan-Lamongan section in Lamongan Kota, Lamongan, East Java. Public Relations Manager of Operation Region VIII Surabaya, Luqman Arif said that the car was crushed by Jayabaya train at KM 185+2 2/3 and was badly damaged and almost out of shape, the incident killed 2 people. As a result of the incident, Locomotive CC206 series CC206 13 12 was damaged and replaced by Surabaya Pasarturi depot locomotive, causing a delay of more than 1 hour on the northern crossing of Java Island Semarang-Surabaya corridor.
- 19 April 2023 – A car with the police number B 1559 NCQ entered the rail line on the section between Sumpiuh-Tambak, Tambak, Banyumas, Central Java. The driver with the initials C who was driving from the direction of Purworejo, the cause was due to the driver's deliberate actions to enter the tracks from the direction of Tambak. After witnessing the incident, the Public Relations Manager of Purwokerto Operation Region V, Krisbiyantoro, said that the car was not hit by a train, nor was it stuck. The driver was about to crash into a passing bus. Until the driver did something dangerous, namely crossing the tracks. One of the passengers said the driver and passengers who wanted to die all together. The driver then swerved to the right and crossed, after that. The driver immediately ran away. Sumpiuh Police tested the urine of the driver with the initials C, after the urine test, C was positive for methamphetamine and amphetamine. The incident is likely to cause delays in train schedules, especially the southern and central lines of Java Island, Bandung-Kutoarjo and Purwokerto-Kutoarjo corridors.
- 29 April 2023 – The body of the Chief of Drugs of the Greater Jakarta Metropolitan Regional Police, Buddy Alfrits Towoliu, was found. It is likely that the body was found in the plot between Klender Baru-Cakung, Cakung, East Jakarta, before the incident. The victim left the Greater Jakarta Metropolitan Regional Police building and was recorded by CCTV leaving and changing clothes, then also recorded by CCTV at Jatinegara Station and several locations. Until he was hit by the Tegal Bahari train, Tegal-Pasar Senen. The victim was suspected of committing suicide and was brought back to his hometown in Kotamobagu, North Sulawesi.
- 28 June 2023 – Sri Tanjung train (KA 244/241) of Ketapang-Lempuyangan relation was crushed by a car at a level crossing in Kalipuro, Banyuwangi, East Java; on the rail line at Argopuro Station-Banyuwangi Kota plot. The accident began when a Honda Mobilio car with police number P 1448 WR, containing a couple, suddenly entered the railroad crossing without a crossbar and stopped. At that time the front end of the car was in the middle of the rail. The car, which could not avoid, was immediately hit. As a result of this incident, the locomotive CC 201 83 31 carrying Sri Tanjung train was damaged in several parts, including the ladder and stringing device.
- 18 July 2023 – Sribilah train with Rantau Prapat-Medan relation was crushed by a car on Marah Rusli road, Kisaran, Asahan, North Sumatra, between Hengelo-Kisaran. The accident began when a Nissan car with license plate BK 1747 RK containing 2 veterinarians was hesitating when it was about to cross the crossing without a doorstop, the distance was so close that the car could not avoid and was hit by Sribilah train. 1 person died in this incident and 1 other victim was critical and immediately rushed to the nearest health facility.
- 18 July 2023 – Kuala Stabas train KA S8 with Tanjung Karang – Baturaja relation was hit by a truck loaded with sugarcane in the patch between Blambangan Pagar-Kalibalangan station, Blambangan Pagar, North Lampung. The accident was caused by the sugarcane truck driver's lack of caution when crossing the tracks without a crossbar. The close proximity resulted in the truck being unable to avoid and was dragged for 100 meters. The official locomotive CC 201 83 42r or CC 201 120r suffered severe damage at the short end and all axles fell off and the locomotive tilted to the left of the direction of the train. There were no casualties in this incident.
- 18 July 2023 – Brantas train (KA 112) with Pasar Senen-Blitar relation was stuck by a low bed dolly truck at the Madukoro Road crossing located at the Jerakah-Semarang Poncol Station plot, West Semarang, Semarang City, Central Java. The accident was caused by the truck driver's lack of understanding of the terrain, which caused the trailer to get stuck on the tracks. The accident caused a large explosion due to the truck's spilled fuel tank. Traffic on the northern route of Java Island in the Cirebon-Semarang corridor was disrupted due to this incident. Locomotive CC 201 77 11 SDT or CC 201 15 suffered burn damage to the short end and K1 0 80 01 BL as executive 1 suffered minor damage to the bogies and was removed from the train. There were no casualties in this incident, only 1 passenger suffered a broken right leg due to panic when trying to save himself out of the train.
- 29 September 2023 – Jayakarta train (KA 218) of Pasar Senen-Surabaya Gubeng route hit a forklift on the section between Lemahabang and Kedunggedeh stations, East Cikarang, Bekasi, West Java; which resulted in locomotive CC 206 crashing. There were no casualties in this incident, but the Jayakarta train journey was delayed by 156 minutes and train traffic in the Jakarta-Cirebon/Bandung corridor was disrupted.
- 17 October 2023 – at 13:05 am local time, Argo Semeru train (KA 17) of Surabaya Gubeng-Gambir relation crashed at KM 520+4 between Wates-Sentolo at the bend of the former Kalimenur halte (train stop), Sentolo, Kulon Progo, Yogyakarta. A minute afterward, Argo Wilis train (KA 6) of Bandung-Surabaya Gubeng relation attacked the derailed train of Argo Semeru train (KA 17). This incident caused both trains to derail, causing delays and train traffic on the southern and central Java route of the Kutoarjo-Yogyakarta corridor was closed due to the incident.

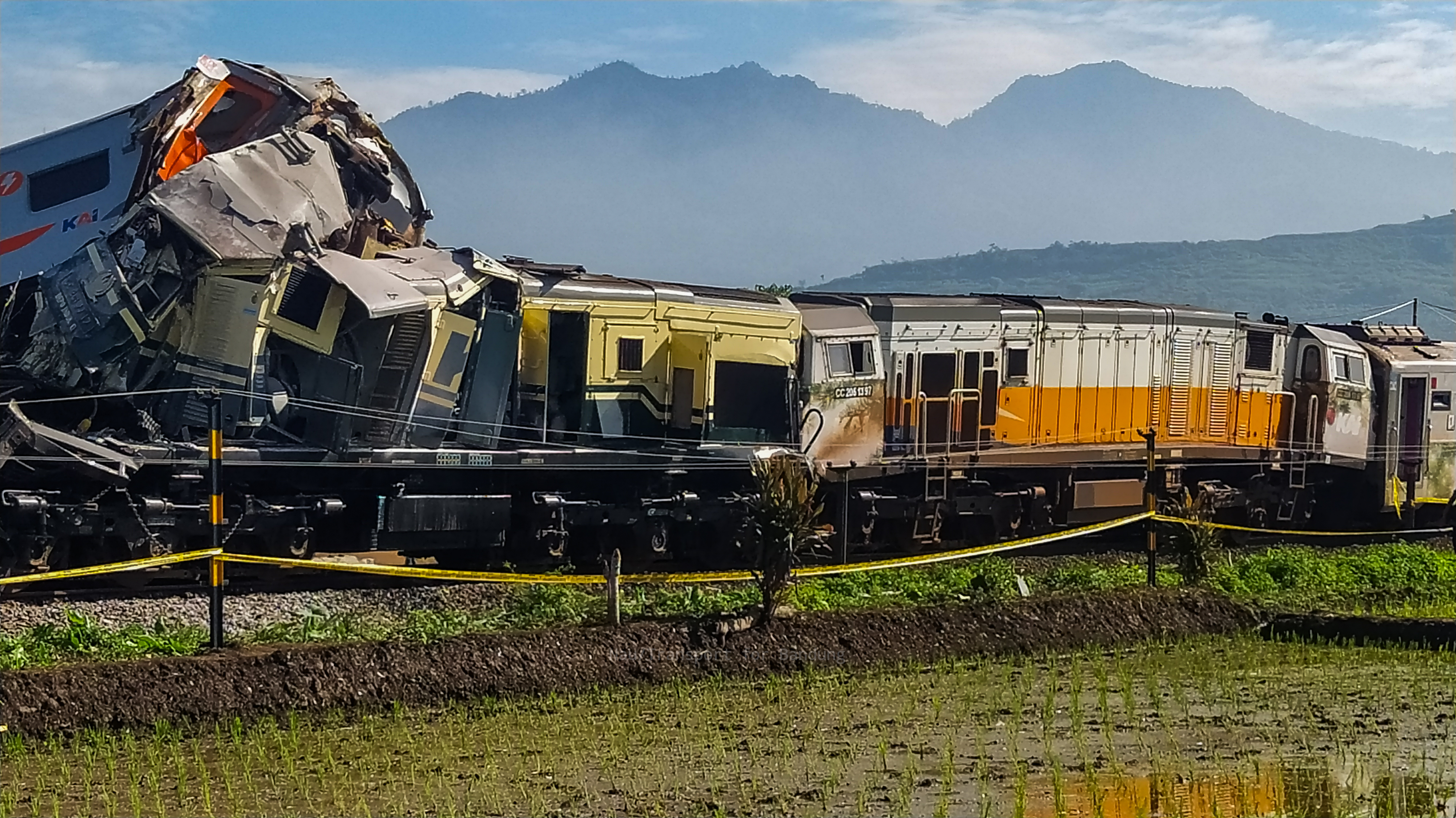
Two Collided Locomotives of 2024 Cicalengka Accident

=== 2024 ===
- 5 January 2024: Turangga train (KA PLB 65A) on Surabaya Gubeng-Bandung route collided with Commuter Line Bandung Raya (KA 350) on Padalarang-Cicalengka route at km 181+700, Cicalengka-Haurpugur section, Cicalengka, Bandung, West Java; the accident caused 4 deaths, namely the driver and assistant driver of Commuter Line Bandung Raya train, Turangga train attendant, and security unit of Cimekar Station; around 20–31 people were injured. As a result of the incident, train traffic across southern Java in the Bandung-Kutoarjo corridor was disrupted. Further information : 2024 Cicalengka railway collision
- 14 January 2024:
  - At around 16:30 WIB – Gaya Baru Malam Selatan train (PLB 105A train) of Surabaya Gubeng-Pasar Senen route hit a car at the level crossing at km 150+3 between Srowot-Brambanan Station, Prambanan, Klaten, Central Java. As a result of the incident, train traffic on the southern and central lines of the Yogyakarta-Surakarta corridor was disrupted where the locomotive was damaged when the train stopped unusually at Brambanan Station.
  - At 19:00 WIB – the Wijayakusuma train (KA PLB 120A-117A) of Ketapang-Surabaya Gubeng-Cilacap route hit a car suspected to be a member of the Banyuwangi Regency DPRD at a level crossing between Rogojampi-Temuguruh, Glenmore, Banyuwangi, East Java. So that the Wijayakusuma train had to make an extraordinary stop to check the condition of the locomotive due to the tempering of the car and the accident killed the Banyuwangi DPRD member from the National Awakening Party faction which resulted in damage to the rear of the car.
  - At 7:57 a.m. – Pandalungan train (KA 78–75) of Gambir-Surabaya Pasarturi-Jember relation crashed right at the north side wesel of Tanggulangin Station, Sidoarjo, East Java. This incident caused congestion on Jalan Raya Kludan and Jalan Raya Perumtas, as the back of the train blocked the lane. PT KAI Daop VIII decided to immediately evacuate the locomotive and the plummeting front train which resulted in disrupted train traffic on the Wonokromo-Bangil railway line.
- 15 February 2024 – the locomotive on Manahan train number 79A, Solo Balapan-Jakarta Gambir relation, derailed after being bumped by a sand truck at a level crossing in Tanjung, Brebes, Central Java; precisely at km 261+2 between Ketanggungan and Ciledug stations, killing two people, a father and son. There were no casualties from the passengers of the Manahan train in the accident, but there was damage to the front of locomotive CC 203 due to the tempering of the truck and rail traffic on the central Java Island Cirebon-Purwokerto corridor was disrupted, especially on the downstream line.
- 19 March 2024 – Putri Deli train with number U76A hit a Fuso Super Great truck loaded with fertilizer at Pasar Bengkel, Perbaungan close to Lidah Tanah station. The truck broke through the crossing barrier and broke down in the middle of the tracks. As a result of the collision, Locomotive BB203 78 03 MDN suffered serious damage to its cabin. There were no fatalities in this accident, but the driver and assistant driver suffered minor injuries due to being trapped in the cabin.
- 25 September 2024 – early in the morning, Taksaka train (KA 70) relations Gambir–Yogyakarta crashed into a truck concrete mixer at level crossing between Sentolo station and Rewulu station, Bantul Regency, Yogyakarta. This incident caused damage to the front of the locomotive CC206 and 1 executive class passenger train. There were no fatalities due to the incident, but the engineer and assistant driver of the Taksaka train were injured.
- 1 October 2024 – at 08.50 Local time, the Pandalungan train connecting Gambir–Jember crashed into a truck loaded with animal feed at between Grati Station–Bayeman, Probolinggo Regency, East Java. This incident caused damage to the front of the locomotive CC203 95 08. There were no fatalities due to this incident, but engineer, assistant engineer, and one officer who was traveling on the train locomotive Pandalungan fire suffered injuries.

=== 2025 ===
- 1 January 2025 – Probowangi train relation Ketapang–Surabaya Gubeng PP hit car in Banyuwangi, 3 people injured.
- 10 January 2025 Sancaka train from Surabaya Gubeng station to Yogyakarta station hit truck in Sragen.
- 15 January 2025 – Pandanwangi train hit truck in Banyuwangi which broke down at the crossing line.
- 19 February 2025 – Parcel Utara train bound for Malang station from Kampung Bandan station hit an Open-back car on the Pondok Jati station crossing.
- 10 March 2025 – at 10.47 Western Indonesian Time, Kertanegara train (KA 167) on the Malang–Purwokerto hit a truck loaded with fertilizer between Kras and Ngadiluwih Stations, Kediri Regency. This incident caused 2 people to be injured and 1 to die, also 2 trains were canceled and 2 others were late. The incident also caused severe damage to the front of the locomotive CC203 95 02.
- 10 March 2025 – Singasari train hit car Honda BR-V in Blitar, East Java. 1 people died.
- 26 March 2025 – at 08.45 WIB, The Batara Kresna train on the Wonogiri–Purwosari route hit a Daihatsu Sigra type Car at a level crossing in Sukoharjo. This incident resulted in 4 deaths and 3 others injured.
- 8 April 2025 – A truck carrying logs was hit by the Jenggala Commuter Line on the Indro station–Surabaya Pasar Turi station crossing JPL 11 km 7+600 Kelurahan Tenggulunan, Kebomas, Gresik. The accident killed the assistant engineer who was on duty in the locomotive.
- 12 April 2025 – a forklift was parked carelessly on the Kandangan–Indro railroad. The forklift operator stated that he had tried to move the forklift during the incident, but was blocked by the ground contour which hampered the movement of the tires. The forklift was not moved until it was finally hit by a train.
- 19 April 2025 – the journey of the Bogor Commuter Line with train number KA 1040 was hampered by a car that was stuck between the road and the bottom of the car. The car passengers ran away from the car before the car was finally hit by the KRL, causing the KRL to derail. There is no certainty about the closure of the crossing due to the accident.
- 30 April 2025 – An accident occurred between the Ijen Ekspres train and a dump truck in Plalangan Village, Kalisat District, Jember Regency, East Java, causing the truck driver to suffer a broken nose and be rushed to the Kalisat Regional Hospital. The accident also damaged the nose of the Locomotive CC 201 Vintage Livery PJKA.
- 8 May 2025 – There was an incident on the Harina Train (96) on the route Bandung to Surabaya Pasar Turi which hit a truck on the Direct Crossing Road 05, Semarang Tawang–Alastua section of the road, Semarang City, Central Java, at around 04.44 local time. The truck driver died.
- 19 May 2025 – the Malioboro Ekspres train on the Purwokerto–Malang route hit seven motorcycles near Magetan station, precisely in Mangge, West Magetan, Magetan, East Java. As a result, four people were reported dead and others injured. The incident began when the Matarmaja train crossed the JPL 08 crossing first. After Matarmaja passed, the crossing gate was opened and several motorcycles crossed. However, from the opposite direction, the 170 Malioboro Ekspres train on the Purwokerto–Malang route appeared, which ended up hitting around seven vehicles that were about to leave and were already on the tracks.
- 18 June 2025 – a water tanker driver died instantly after the vehicle he was driving was hit by an Ambarawa train on the Surabaya–Semarang route at a gated but unguarded crossing in Karanglangit Village, Lamongan District, East Java.
- 20 June 2025 – a collision occurred between a truck and a Tokyo Metro 6000 trainset 6024 on Jalan Jenderal Sudirman, Tanah Tinggi, Tangerang. The collision caused the truck to overturn. The TM 6024 trainset suffered severe damage to the cabin emergency door and the side. At around 06:00 the trainset was towed to Tangerang station.
- 5 July 2025 – The Kuala Stabas S5 train (Baturaja-Lampung) derailed in Way Kanan, Lampung, between Negeri Agung Station and Tulungbuyut Station. The derailment reportedly occurred in the front off-duty executive train (LD).
- 26 July 2025 – The Argo Bromo Anggrek (KA 4) train journey from Jakarta Gambir Station to Surabaya Pasarturi was delayed due to problems with the train's boogie (wheels) at Losari Station, Central Java, which caused a delay of around 236 minutes (almost 4 hours) for the train.
- 1 August 2025 – the Argo Bromo Anggrek train (KA 1) on the Surabaya Pasar Turi–Gambir route derailed at the Pegaden Baru yard, Subang Regency, West Java. This incident resulted in the northern Java railway line in the Cikampek–Cirebon railway line corridor being paralyzed and temporarily impassable. The impact of this incident, all trains were diverted via a longer route, namely via Cikampek–Bandung–Tasikmalaya–Kroya. There were no fatalities from this incident, but 1 person suffered minor injuries due to the collision.
- 5 August 2025 – at 07.17 WIB, KA 1189 Commuter Line from Bogor - Jakarta Kota derailed at the Wesel entrance to track 9 Jakarta Kota Station. There were no fatalities in this incident. However, the impact of the incident resulted in all KRL Commuter trains heading to Jakarta Kota being forced to end their journeys at Jayakarta Station and some others ending their journeys at Manggarai Station.
- 19 August 2025 – At 19.14 WIB, KA 471A Commuter Line Jenggala on the Surabaya Pasar Turi Station - Sidoarjo route experienced an electrical fault which resulted in the train's braking system failing. This caused the Jenggala Commuter Train to continue traveling at high speed when entering the turning lane of Sidoarjo Station which should have been the final stopping station. Fortunately, the train did not derail and was able to stop safely at KM 28+1 of the road section between Sidoarjo Station - Tanggulangin Station after security officers and the driver pulled the emergency brake lever. There were no fatalities in this incident, the Jenggala Commuter Train journey the next day used a business class emergency train.
- 8 September 2025 – A Nissan Serena being hit by a train, train KA 155 Ranggajati, at JPL 166 Probolinggo, East Java
- 20 September 2025 :
  - The Mataram (KA 76) train bound for Solo Balapan collided with a sand truck at km 188+6 Jakarta-Cirebon-Kroya, Kertasemaya District, Indramayu, West Java. The collision caused heavy damage to the CC 204 locomotive pulling it. The train driver and his assistant were reported safe.
  - A Bangunkarta train (KA 162) on the Jakarta (Pasarsenen) - Jombang route was hit by a Chevrolet Spin with license plate number B 1511 SMC at kilometer 186+8/9 of the upstream lane of the Jatibarang-Kertasemaya road (JPL 153 was registered and unattended). Two passengers in the car sustained injuries.
- 24 September 2025 - The Tawang Jaya train on the Pasar Senen-Semarang Tawang route was involved in an accident with a Carry pickup truck in the Kanci-Waruduwur area, Cirebon Regency, West Java, on Wednesday afternoon. The Suzuki Carry pickup truck was dragged quite far from the initial point of impact. The incident occurred at kilometer 213+3/4 of the Cirebon Prujakan-Waruduwur road, precisely at an unguarded crossing gate. As a result of this incident, two people were reported to have died at the scene. The incident resulted in the locomotive being damaged and had to be replaced at Waruduwur Station.
- 21 October 2025 – The Harina (train), traveling from Semarang to Surabaya, collided with an unloaded trailer truck at the Kaligawe Road crossing in Semarang, Central Java, on Tuesday afternoon. The incident, which occurred at around 4:37 PM WIB, caused the train to stop for about 1.5 hours in the middle of the crossing due to the accident, before finally being pulled back to Semarang Tawang railway station at around 6:10 PM WIB. There were no fatalities in the incident, but the train was damaged and disrupted several train schedules.
- 25 October 2025 – A KRL Commuterline train on the Rangkasbitung-Tanah Abang route derailed at Rangkasbitung Station, Muara Ciujung Timur, Lebak Regency, Banten. The train derailed shortly after departing Rangkasbitung Station near a level crossing in the Leuwiranji area. Passengers were evacuated and transferred to the next Commuter Line train departing from Rangkasbitung Station.
- 25 October 2025 – A Purwojaya train (KA 58F) with the Gambir - Cilacap route experienced a derailment incident at the Kedunggedeh Station yard, Bekasi, West Java. There were no fatalities, but the incident disrupted train traffic on the northern Java line.
- 4 November 2025 – A collision occurred between the Bangunkarta (KA 161) train (Jombang-Pasar Senen) and several vehicles at the PJL Prambanan 320 crossing point in Sleman, Yogyakarta. The incident was captured on camera, showing several vehicles still passing, unaware of the approaching train. The Bangunkarta train was seen applying emergency braking, but unfortunately, a passing car and motorcycle were hit by the train. Three people died. The cause of the accident was an error in the railway crossing gate.

=== 2026 ===
- 13 January 2026 – In the afternoon, the Putri Deli Train on the Medan - Tanjung Balai route hit a truck at the level crossing between Kisaran Station - Tanjung Balai Station. As a result of this incident, the Putri Deli locomotive (CC201 83 28 MDN) suffered damage to the LH (Longhood) section. Fortunately, there were no fatalities in this incident.
- 21 January 2026 – At 2:46 a.m. local time, the Menoreh train (PLB 177B), pulled by locomotive CC 201 89 06, collided with a water tanker truck in the Babakan-Waruduwur station section, West Java. Three people were injured. The locomotive suffered severe damage to its cabin and two axles were derailed, while the tanker truck was destroyed. The incident disrupted some train services.
- 26 January 2026 – At 23.50 WIB, a resident died due to being hit by a Turangga train on the Bandung - Surabaya Gubeng route in Pedak Baru Sorowajan, Banguntapan, Bantul, DIY.
- 27 January 2026 – The Gajayana train (KA 35) on the Malang-Gambir route collided with a truck at the Kutowinangun District crossing in Kebumen, Central Java on Tuesday evening. The truck driver, Sutarno, died at the scene, while the conductor and the crossing gate guard were rushed to the hospital with injuries. The incident destroyed the railway guard post and severely damaged the truck, disrupting train schedules on the southern Java route.
- 4 February 2026 – At 20.45 WIB, the Sembrani Train on the route Surabaya Pasarturi - Gambir was hit by a car at an unguarded crossing Datinawong Village, Babat District, Lamongan, East Java. As a result of this incident, one person died, another person was seriously injured, and the car was severely damaged due to the hard impact.
- 9 February 2026 – at 12:00 WIB, an elementary school student was hit by a commuter train at the Parung Panjang Station crossing. As a result, the student died on the spot due to the severe blow.
- 20 February 2026 – the Soekarno-Hatta Airport Train collided with a truck at the JPL 21 level crossing on the Rawa Buaya-Batuceper route. The incident occurred at around 6:05 a.m. WIB and began when a trailer truck got stuck on the railroad crossing. As a result of the incident, the Airport Train derailed not far from Poris Station, Tangerang City. The KRL route to Tangerang was also affected and only served as far as Rawa Buaya Station. No casualties were reported in this incident.
- 6 March 2026 – At 1:49 a.m. WIB, the Blambangan Express collided with a truck at JPL 13, section 1 of the Probolinggo Station - Leces Station road. As a result of this incident, the locomotive Blamex Train (CC 201 83 53 JR) suffered very severe damage to the cabin, resulting in the driver and assistant driver suffering serious and moderate injuries.
- 7 March 2026 – At approximately 7:00 PM WIB, Lembah Anai train relation Padang - Kayu Tanam was hit by 3 teenagers in the Prof Dr Hamka road area, Parupuk Tabing Village, Koto Tangah District, Padang City, West Sumatra. As a result of this hit, 2 people died on the spot and 1 person was injured.
- 11 March 2026 – At 17.50 WIB, a pedestrian died after hitting Airport Train with number 902 at the railroad crossing Jalan Panjang, Kebon Jeruk, West Jakarta, DKI Jakarta.
- 19 March 2026:
  - At 6:54 PM WIB, Train 407/408 Commuter Line Dhoho route Surabaya Kota - Kertosono - Malang was hit by a person at KM 184+800 section Kediri Station - Ngadiluwih Station.
  - At 19.34 WIB, KA 71 Mutiara Selatan route Surabaya Gubeng - Bandung motorcycle crash at JPL 90 near Baron station.
- 23 March 2026 – At 17.00 WIB, SupasPro train was hit by a motorbike in the Waru Station - Wonokromo Station section, precisely at JPL 25, Jemur Wonosari, Wonocolo, Surabaya, East Java. The victim died on the spot after being thrown and hitting the rail fence hard.
- 1 April 2026 – at 14:48 WIB local time, KA Ciremai with number 174B hit a landslide on the Sasaksaat station - Maswati station section. The incident, which also befell locomotive CC206 13 66 SMC, resulted in the locomotive derailing around 3 axles. As a result of this incident, many trains were delayed, detoured, and even had their journeys cancelled. The locomotive evacuation was completed in the evening.
- 3 April 2026 – at 04:12 WIB local time, KRL Commuter Line bound for Jakarta with trip number 1157 was derailed at Bogor station - Cilebut station.
- 6 April 2026 – at 14:15 WIB local time, Bangunkarta train with trip number 161 experienced a derailment incident at Bumiayu Station - Linggapura station, more precisely at KM312+2. As a result of this incident, economy 1 - 4 derailed and the worst was economy 2 and 3 which covered the adjacent track. This incident also caused train journeys to be detoured and some were canceled.
- 27 April 2026 – 2026 Bekasi train crash - at approximately 20:00 WIB local time, a Green SM taxi was struck by a KRL Commuter Line CLI-125 train heading to Jakarta, which caused PLB 5568A, a Tokyo Metro 6000 bound for Cikarang, to stop at Bekasi Timur station, where it was then rear-ended by an Argo Bromo Anggrek intercity train. The hindmost women-only carriage was severely destroyed. At least 16 people were killed and 90 were injured.
- 1 May 2026 – At 02:52 WIB local time, The Argo Bromo Anggrek train collided with a Toyota Avanza transporting prospective Hajj pilgrims in Grobogan, Central Java. Five people were killed and 4 was injured.
- 27 August 2026-At 1:25am WIB The Malabar train running as KA 68 hit a sand laden truck(with police number 9264 FG)at JPL 295 in Klaten,Central Java.The truck broke down on the crossing as the train approached.The CC206 1341 had severe cab damage and was towed on a KLB(unscheduled)train whilst 1341 was swapped for another CC206 and at 6:01 WIB the train got underway.14 other trains including the southern parcel and Gajayana were held up by the mess.

== See also ==
- Classification of railway accidents
- Commission of Railway Safety
- List of rail accidents
- List of rail accidents by country
- List of accidents and disasters by death toll#Rail accidents and disasters
- Jakarta Monorail
- Polsuska
- Transport in Indonesia
- List of named passenger trains of Indonesia
- List of railway stations in Indonesia
- List of railway companies in the Dutch East Indies
- List of defunct railway in Indonesia
- List of active railway in Indonesia
- List of Kereta Api Indonesia rolling stock classes
- List of locomotives in Indonesia
- Rail transport in Indonesia
- Trams in Surabaya
- Bali MRT
- Indonesian railway rolling stock numbering system and classification
