= EMD GT38ACe =

Diesel–electric locomotive

EMD GT38AC
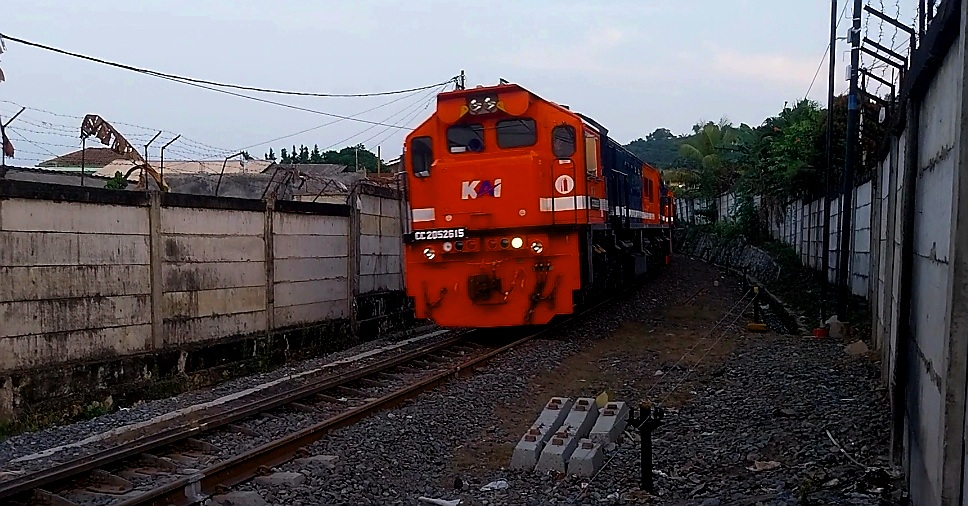
- Double traction of EMD GT38AC pulling freight train 4035F near Garuntang Station.
Type and origin
- Power type: Diesel–electric
- Builder: Electro-Motive Diesel
- Model: GT38AC
- Build date: 2011-Present
- Total produced: 115 (86 ordered by Indonesian Railways Co. and 5 bonus units delivered by Progress Rail - EMD for Indonesian Railways Co.)
Specifications
- Configuration
  - AAR: C-C
  - UIC: Co’Co’
- Gauge: 3 ft 6 in (1,067 mm)
- Trucks: Custom Fabricated Trucks
- Length: 58 ft 0 in (17.68 m)
- Height: 12 ft 3.5 in (3.747 m)
- Axle load: 18 tonnes
- Loco weight: 238,099 lb (108,000 kg) or 119 short tons (106 long tons; 108 t)
- Fuel type: diesel fuel
- Fuel capacity: 1,003 US gal (835 imp gal; 3,800 L)
- Prime mover: 8-710G3A
- Engine type: two-stroke diesel
- Aspiration: turbocharged
- Displacement: 5,680 cubic inches (93.1 liters)
- Alternator: TA-12-CA9 AC
- Traction motors: 1 inverter per truck, 6 AC traction motors
- Cylinders: V8
- Transmission: diesel electric
- Loco brake: Air
- Train brakes: Air
Performance figures
- Maximum speed: 50 mph (80 km/h)
- Power output: on engine: 2,200 hp (1,640 kW); traction output : 2,000 hp (1,490 kW)
- Tractive effort: 101,164 lbf (450.00 kN) (starting) 89,924 lbf (400.00 kN) (continuous)
Career
- Operators: Indonesian Railway Company; 4th Regional Division of Tanjung Karang
- Numbers: 115
- Nicknames: Sumatran Elephant
- Disposition: 85 in operation, 2 inoperative temporarily, 4 damaged beyond repair

The EMD GT38AC (known as CC205 in Indonesia) diesel–electric locomotives are made by Electro-Motive Diesel for export in Indonesia. There are 91 locomotives owned by the state-owned Indonesian Railway Company (PT Kereta Api Indonesia), all of them are for in Sumatra and replace the aging EMD G26. It's also one of two most advanced-technology locomotive in Indonesia (another one is GE CM20EMP).

== History ==
PT Kereta Api Indonesia has operated some EMD G26 (G26MC-2U, or known in Indonesia as CC 202) since 1986 and some of them began to break down due to their ages and severe works. In 2011, PT Kereta Api Indonesia began to look for the replacements of G26MC-2U; more powerful and advanced locomotives than G26MC-2Us. After several auction processes, EMD won the contract to build more powerful locomotives with AC traction technology for PT. KAI.

== Numbering ==
Older locomotives were numbered as CC 205 01 to CC 205 55 (including the bonus unit). However, due to the most recent regulation of the Ministry of Transportation, then the numbering system is changed according to its arrival year. The newer locomotives used new numbering system from the Ministry of Transportation (CC 205 21 01 - CC 205 21 36).

- The first arrival (2011)

In this year, the first six locomotives arrived. Their numberings were CC 205 01 to CC 205 06. However, to comply with the most recent regulation, the numberings were changed into CC 205 11 01 to CC 205 11 06

- The second arrival (2013)

There were 44 locomotives arriving in this year. Their numberings were CC 205 07 to CC 205 50. However, to comply with the most recent regulation, the numbering were changed into CC 205 13 01 to CC 205 13 44.

- The bonus units (2014)

The five bonus units arrived in 2014. These units were numbered as CC 205 51 to CC 205 55. However, to comply with the most recent regulation, the numberings were changed into CC 205 14 01 to CC 205 14 05.

- The third arrival (2021)

There were 36 locomotives arrived in 2021. Their numberings were CC 205 21 01 to CC 205 21 36.

== Performance ==
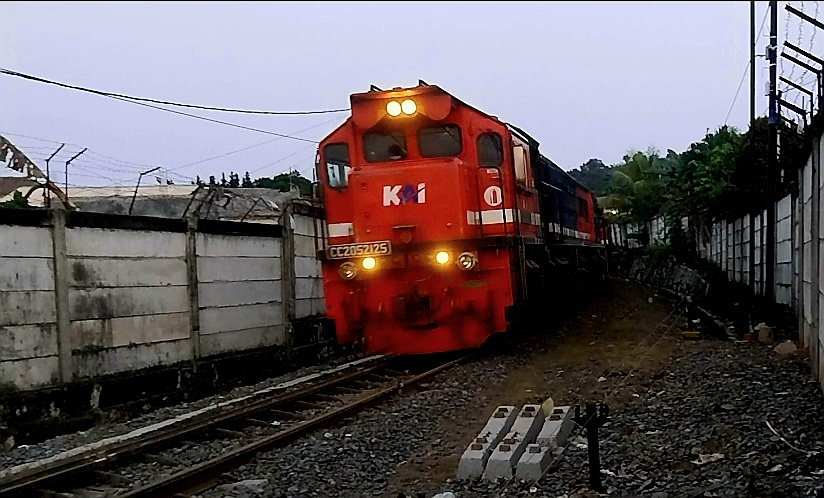
The Double Traction EMD GT38ACe or CC205 curved near Garuntang signal block on 3rd July 2026

The CC205s can haul up more than 48 coal hoppers in single-traction mode, and 80 coal hoppers in double-traction mode. Thanks to the AC Traction technology, the locomotives can generate output more than 2,200 HP (bigger than its predecessor, CC202) and starting tractive effort of as much as 450 kN. But, even with such a big power like that, stations in South Sumatra and Lampung cannot accommodate more than 60 coal gondolas, due to the yard-length limit in many station in South Sumatra and Lampung.

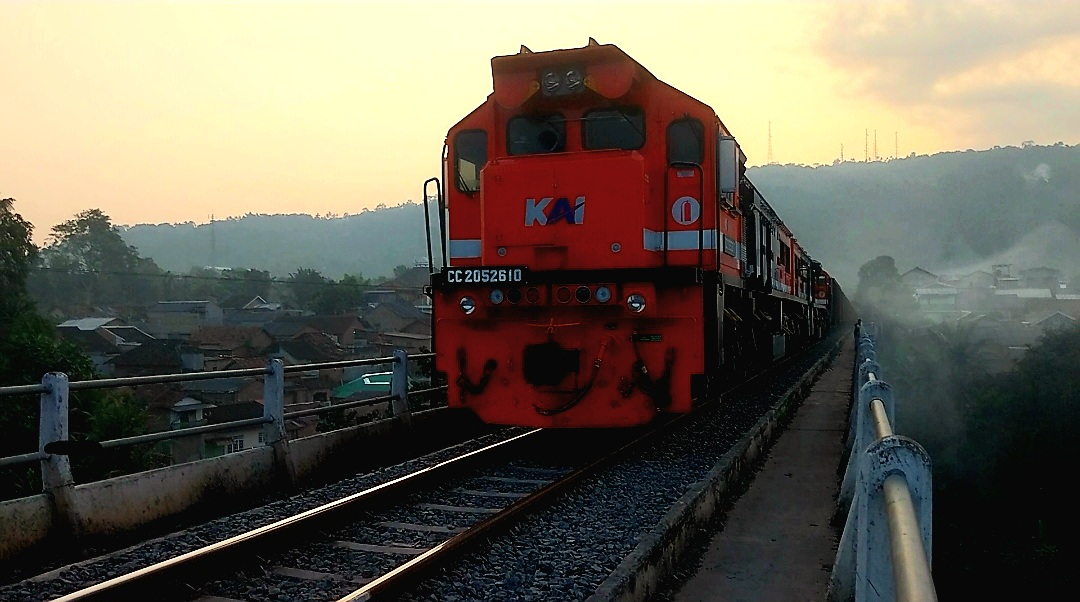
The EMD GT38ACe passing Garuntang Railway Bridge in July 2026

In their early years, one CC205 was able to replace two CC204s or CC202s on hauling 35 (thirty-five) to 45 (forty-five) coal hoppers. Because of the very small numbers of CC205 between 2011 and 2013, they was only used as "solo leaders" (a train with just 1 locomotive leading). Only in 2013, two CC205s are coupled together with Multiple Unit Control. After 2013, two CC205s normally hauls between 50 and 60 coal hoppers.

In their daily operations, two CC205s are coupled together using Multiple Unit for easier haul, especially on steep grades. Unlike other locomotives in Indonesia, CC205 has met EPA Tier 2 emission regulation and is more efficient up to 25% - thanks to the latest generation of EMD 710G3 engine that employs an electronic fuel injection system and several tweaks on the exhaust system. The maximum speed of this locomotive is 50 mph (80 km/h), but it operates normally at 19 - 37 mph (30 – 60 km/h) due to the total gross weight of the entire cars coupled to CC205s. With the same amount of payload tonnage, two units of CC205s can replace three units of CC202s for hauling 60 coal hoppers, with one hopper has 50 tons maximum payload.

In the flat section of Kertapati - Prabumulih line, single CC205 has been tested to pull 58 flatcars with modified container. When the 2025 and 2026 batch of CC205 will arrive in Indonesia, some of them will be based on Kertapati Depot (Palembang) to haul private coal trains.

== Builders ==
All of the first batch locomotives were built at EMD Plant in London, Ontario. Later batches came from EMD Plant at Muncie, Indiana.

== Features ==
All of the CC205s have a distinctive Perumka/PT Kereta Api's 1990s-style red-and-blue livery, similar to the CC201s and CC202s allocated at South Sumatran railway. Inside the cab, old school side controller has been replaced with more modern cab with EM2000 computer system and digital display. CC205s also equipped with an automatic engine start/stop (AESS) system, which is the first type of locomotives in Indonesia using AESS, and makes CC205 be the most efficient locomotive in fuel usage. They are even equipped with Nathan AirChime KS-1 single tone horns, similar to the older CC202 (EMD G26MC-2U) locomotives.

== Bonus units and reorder for PT. Kereta Api Indonesia ==
In 2014, PT. KAI received 5 (five) more EMD GT38ACe from Progress Rail - EMD as bonus units. These bonus units were given free by Progress Rail - EMD as their compensation of responsibility due to the lateness of delivery (off-schedule) of 44 (forty-four) EMD GT38AC ordered by PT. KAI to Indonesia in 2013. As a result, PT. KAI has 55 units GT38AC's; 50 were purchased and 5 were bonus. All 55 (fifty-five) units of GT38AC's owned by PT. KAI are in service, hauling coal trains in Sumatra.

On April 16, 2020, PT Kereta Api Indonesia (PT KAI) has signed a contract for 36 new GT38ACe freight locomotives, expanding the public railway operator's existing GT Series fleet. 36 new locomotives will go into service for PT KAI's South Sumatra coal haulage operations and join more than 50 other GT38AC locomotives already operating in this service since 2011. Delivery of the locomotives expected in late 2021, and arrived in Panjang Harbour, Lampung, Indonesia on June 19, 2021, June 26, 2021, and September 22–24, 2021.

On February 15, 2024, PT KAI has signed a contract with Progress Rail for 54 additional GT38AC locomotives. They are expected to be delivered in stages from April 2025 to April 2026.

== Other operator ==
In February 2015, Congo-Ocean Railway took delivery of 10 GT38AC locomotives, which have specifications similar to those of PT KAI locomotives, except for some minor technical differences, particularly in their fuel management systems. Note: the type of the Indonesian locomotives is GT38ACe, while the ones for Congo are GT38AC.

== Incident and accidents ==
- On June 15, 2015, the coal gondola train with train number KA 3029 crashed into the rearmost wagon of KA 3027 which was being blocked by the incoming signal from Metur Station, Ogan Komering Ulu Regency, South Sumatra. As a result of the collision, two wagon of KA 3027 (wagons numbers 46 and 47) which were hit by locomotive KA 3029 were destroyed and lifted onto wagon number 45, as well as two KA 3029 locomotives (CC 205 13 41 and CC 205 13 10) which suffered minor physical damage, but suffered significant damage to the computer system. The locomotive involved in this accident was sent to Balai Yasa Lahat for repair and has returned to service in 2019.
- On October 6, 2015, the coal gondola train with train number KA 3026 crashed into the rearmost wagon of KA 3024 which was stopped at Negeri Agung Station, Way Kanan Regency, Lampung. There were no fatalities, but as a result of the collision, the trainset of KA 3024 which was hit by KA 3026 locomotives was damaged and derailed 17 axles, as well as two locomotives of KA 3026 (CC 205 13 15 and CC 205 13 26) and 2 (two) the wagon behind it derailed 20 axles and damaged rail components at this station. The evacuation process for the two derailed trains was completed at 19.22 WIB on 7 October 2015 and caused all train cancelled. The locomotive involved in this accident was substantially damaged and sent to Progress Rail in 2018, and has returned to Lampung in 2020. As of May 4, 2021, the locomotive has returned into service.
- On December 11, 2021, two coal gondola train with train number KA 3061 hauled by locomotives CC 205 14 04 and CC 205 21 04 crashed into the rearmost wagon of KA 3055 which was stopped at the emplacement of Penanggiran Station, Muara Enim Regency, South Sumatra. As a result, eight wagon from KA 3055 as well as locomotives and 2 wagon from KA 3061 derailed 40 axles. There were no fatalities in this accident, but this caused the trip of two passenger trains, (Serelo and Sindang Marga train) was cancelled on the day of accident.
- On January 4, 2022, coal gondola train with train number KA 3021A derailed on Gedungratu Station, South Lampung Regency, Lampung. The evacuation process of CC 205 11 04 and CC 205 13 03, each derailed one axles, lasted for one hour using a jack. There were no fatalities in this incident. but all of train operation was interrupted for two hours and caused Rajabasa passenger train delayed until 110 minutes.
- On November 7, 2022, two coal gondola train with train number KA 3056A pulled by locomotives CC 205 21 20 and CC 205 13 16 crashed head-on with KA 3031A pulled by locomotives CC 205 13 37 and CC 205 13 33 which was stopped at the emplacement of Rengas Station, Central Lampung Regency, Lampung. As a result, four locomotives was heavily damaged, 2 wagon from KA 3031A and 10 wagon from KA 3056A derailed 36 axles. There were no fatalities in this accident, but this caused all train was cancelled on the day of accident. As of December 30, 2023, all four units was deemed damaged beyond repair and their remaining parts will be cannibalized to other CC 205s.
