= Tasikmalaya derailment =

2014 railway incident in West Java, Indonesia

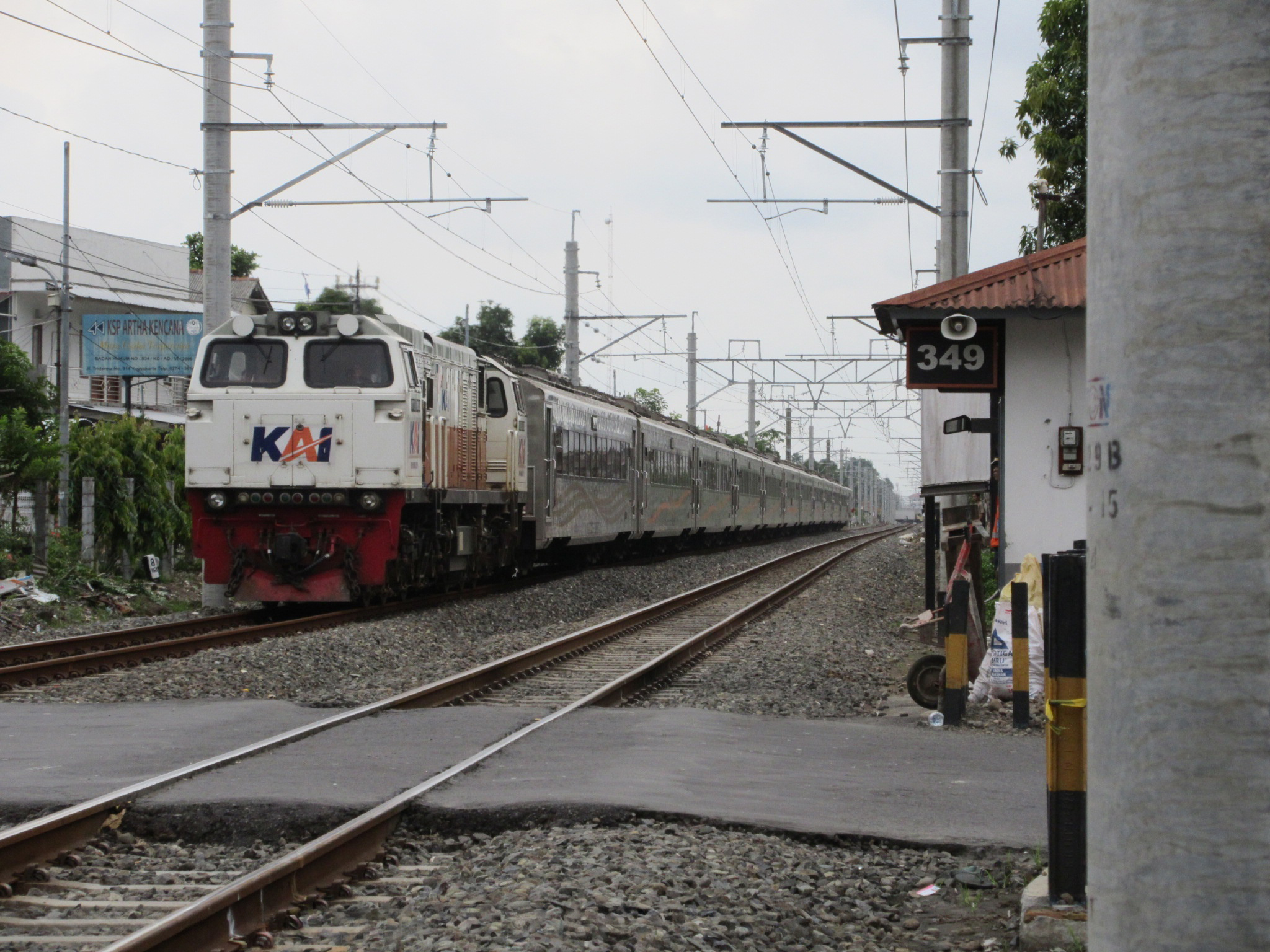
- CC206 13 55 passing JPL 349 at Timoho, Yogyakarta

Details
- Date: 4 April 2014; 18:30 local time (10:30 UTC)
- Location: Kadipaten, Tasikmalaya Regency, West Java
- Country: Indonesia
- Line: Bandung–Banjar
- Operator: Kereta Api Indonesia
- Incident type: Derailment

Statistics
- Trains: 1
- Passengers: 250
- Deaths: 5
- Injured: 35

The Tasikmalaya derailment occurred on 4 April 2014 at 18:30 local time when the passenger train "Malabar", with 250 passengers on board, was derailed by a landslide in Kadipaten, Tasikmalaya Regency, West Java. The accident killed 5 people and injured another 35. Heavy rain triggered the landslide, which derailed the train as it traveled through Java, the most populous island in Indonesia.

== Accident ==
The Malabar train was carrying 11 train cars and 360 passengers at the time of the incident. This accident was caused by a landslide at km 244, Terung Village RT 05 RW 09, Mekarsari Village, Kadipaten District, Tasikmalaya Regency, West Java due to heavy rains with a long duration, so the train overturned. This accident resulted in 5 deaths.

As a result of the accident, two executive-class cars, K1 0 67 27 and K1 0 67 22, along with the CC206 13 55 locomotive fell off the rails. Due to the heavy terrain, the evacuation of the locomotive was hampered. The weight of the 90 metric tons (89 long tons) CC206 locomotive also hindered its evacuation. In addition, because of the very severe damage to carriage K1 0 67 22, the carriage had to be dismantled. Meanwhile, K1 0 67 27 could be saved after being fitted with a temporary bogie and undergoing major repairs at the Manggarai Depot.
