= Saraydan =

Saraydan سرايدان
- Village
- Location within Iran
- Coordinates: 27°15′44″N 60°55′26″E
- Country: Iran
- Province: Sistan and Baluchestan
- County: Iranshahr
- Bakhsh: Central
- Rural District: Abtar

Population (2006)
  - Total: 610
- Time zone: UTC+3:30 (IRST)
  - Summer (DST): UTC+4:30 (IRDT)

Saraydan (Persian: سرايدان, also romanized as Sarāydān; also known as Sāradān and Sāygān) is a village in Abtar Rural District, in the Central District of Iranshahr County, Sistan and Baluchestan Province, Iran. At the 2006 census its population was 610, in 114 families.
