= Kroya =

District of Central Java, Indonesia

- District
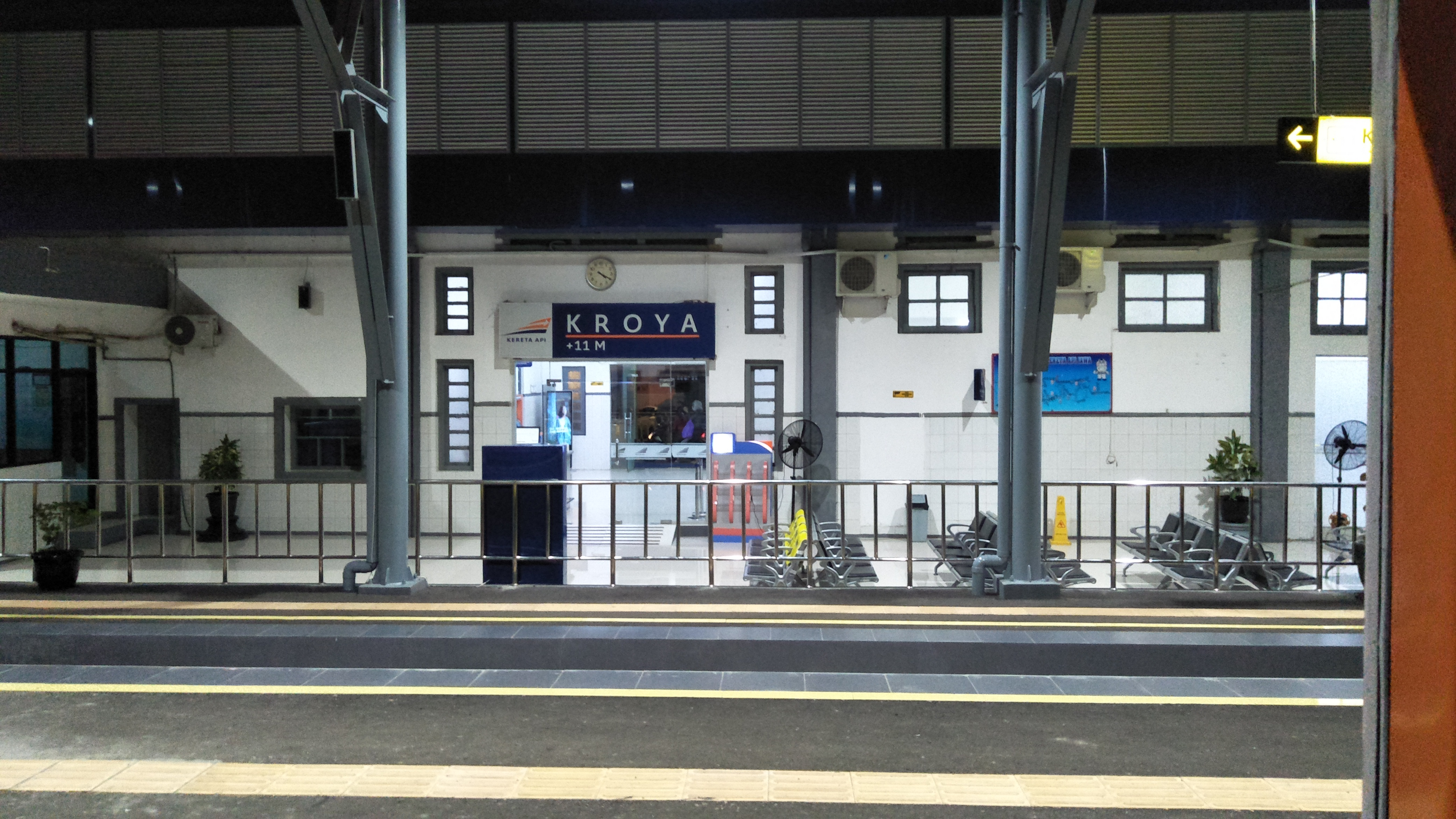
- Kroya railway station
- Interactive map of Kroya
- Coordinates: 7°37′57.0742″S 109°14′40.9783″E
- Country: Indonesia
- Province: Central Java
- Regency: Cilacap Regency
- District seat: Kroya

Area
  - Total: 61.68 km^{2} (23.81 sq mi)

Population (2023)
  - Total: 119,953
  - Density: 1,945/km^{2} (5,037/sq mi)
- Time zone: UTC+7 (IWT)
- Regional code: 33.01.06
- Villages: 17

Kroya is a district in Cilacap Regency, Central Java, Indonesia. As of mid 2023, it was inhabited by 119,953 people, and has the total area of 61.68 km^{2}.

== Geography ==
Kroya district is divided into 17 villages (desa), namely:

- Sikampuh
- Pekuncen
- Ayamalas
- Pesanggrahan
- Kroya
- Karangmangu
- Pucung Kidul
- Mergawati
- Pucung Lor
- Bajing
- Gentasari
- Kedawung
- Mujur
- Buntu
- Karangturi
- Bajing Kulon
- Mujur Lor
