= GE CM20EMP =

Diesel–Electric Locomotive Manufactured by GE for Indonesian Railways

GE CM20EMP CC206
- A GE CM20EMP or CC206 Locomotive unit number 16 02 with Red and Blue "PERUMKA" special livery as Argo Semeru train passing at Lempuyangan Station.
Type and origin
- Power type: Diesel–electric
- Builder: Engine and Body GE Transportation; Bogies by PT Barata Indonesia; Traction Motor PT Pindad
- Model: GE CM20EMP
- Build date: 2012–2013, 2015-2016
- Total produced: 150 units
Specifications
- Configuration
  - Whyte: 0-6-6-0
  - AAR: C-C
  - UIC: Co'Co'
- Gauge: 1,067 mm (3 ft 6 in) Cape gauge
- Bogies: Fabricated bogies (welded construction) by PT Barata Indonesia
- Length: 15,849 mm (52 ft)
- Width: 2,743 mm (9 ft)
- Height: 3,695 mm (12 ft)
- Axle load: 15,000 kg (33,000 lb)
- Loco weight: 90,000 kg (200,000 lb)
- Fuel type: diesel fuel (High-Speed Diesel)
- Prime mover: GE 7FDL-8
- Engine type: 4-stroke V8 turbodiesel
- Alternator: GE 761
- Generator: GE GT601
- Traction motors: 6
- Cylinders: 8
- Loco brake: Westinghouse 26L (Railway air brake, Dynamic braking, Parking brake)
- Safety systems: LOCOCOMM™, LOCOTROL® Distributed Power, Train Control/SCADA, Ultra Cab II Signalling, GE Integrated Function Display™, GE BrightStar™ Microprocessor and Computer System; Bell type: Graham White GW373 E-Bell, Horn type: Nathan P2 horn Nathan P-2 horn + Nathan KS-1L (CC 206 15 15)
Performance figures
- Maximum speed: 160 km/h (99 mph) (Record); 120 km/h (75 mph) (Operational)
- Power output: 1,680 kW (2,250 hp)
- Tractive effort: 248 kN (55,752.62 lbf) (starting); 207 kN (46,535.45 lbf) (continuous)
Career
- Operators: Kereta Api Indonesia
- Numbers: CC 206 13 01-100, 15 01-39, 16 01-11
- Locale: Java Island (Passenger and Freight), South Sumatra (Freight)
- First run: 2013 (generation I); 2015 (generation IIA); 2016 (generation IIB)
- Disposition: 148 units are operating, 2 units are not operating temporarily.

The GE CM20EMP (also known as CC206 in Indonesia) are diesel-electric locomotives owned and operated by Kereta Api Indonesia (Indonesian Railways Co.) and built by GE Transportation. The GE CM20EMPs are multipurpose locomotives, not only for hauling passenger trains (i.e. executive class, business class, or economy class), but also freight trains.

The locomotives' operations started in 2013 and became Indonesian Railway's main workhorse for hauling trains. These locomotives operates along the Java main line for hauling freight and passenger train, and along South Sumatra and Lampung for hauling freight trains, mainly unit coal trains from Tanjung Enim to Kertapati. They are double-cabin, and the most active double-cabin locomotives in Indonesia.

== History ==
Before there was the GE CM20EMPs, there were older double-cab locomotives used in Indonesia, such as the CC200s (Alco-GE UM 106T), the BB301s and BB304s (Krupp M1500BB), and the BB305s (built by CFD). While they were once used for express passenger trains, they are now mostly operated as switchers, and a large majority have been withdrawn.

In the mid-2000s, the Indonesian State Railways Co. decided to modernize its existing mainline fleet, with locomotives such as the recently introduced CC204s (C20EMP locomotives). However, with the increasing cost of maintenance, caused by aging and inefficient locomotives, in 2010, the company decided to buy new diesel–electric locomotives to be added to its roster. Due to the latest law from Indonesia Government's Ministry of Transportation, every new locomotive should no longer have a 'long-hood' position, to decrease the number of accidents. This is related to limited sight of the engineer when the locomotives run on long-hood position.

By September 2012 the company had signed a contract for 100 locomotives of the CM20EMP type and these were introduced in 2013. The locomotives were supplied without bogies ━ the bogies were assembled by Barata Indonesia. After arrival in Indonesia, the locomotives were moved to Yogyakarta Workshops to be trialed and tested.

The bogie of GE CM20EMP series CC206 13 08 that built by Barata Indonesia

Additional 50 locomotives were ordered in 2014, with the first 39 locomotivess arriving on 14 August 2015, and were directly brought to Yogyakarta Workshops. After undergoing testing, 28 locomotives were transferred to Kertapati, South Sumatra to haul unit coal trains in South Sumatra.

The last 11 units arrived in Tanjung Priok on 14 July 2016. As was before, the locomotives were brought to Yogyakarta Workshops to be trialed and tested. After undergoing testing, these 11 units were transferred to Kertapati, South Sumatra to fulfill demands for locomotives to haul unit coal trains.

== Features ==
=== Body ===
A GE CM20EMP Series CC 206 13 17 with Air Conditioning feauture which has been paired in each locomotive cabin.

The CM20EMPs were made when Indonesian Railways Co. needed a double-cab locomotive. The cab and body are similar to the British Rail Class 70 (GE PowerHaul series), but the front windows are like the Indonesian GE U20Cs of class CC203. The headlights and cab doors are like another (unspecified) Indonesian U20C.

=== Engines, specifications, and electronic devices ===
The locomotives uses a newer version of the GE 7FDL-8 engine that meets the same emission standards as the GE Dash 9 Series locomotives. The power output of CM20EMPs is 2,250 horsepower, equal to that of EMD G26, and 100 hp more than the 2,150 hp CC203s/GE U20C. Meanwhile, the tractive effort of these locomotives is as much as 248 kN (starting) and 207 kN (continuous). These locomotives are equipped with GE BrightStar™ computer systems, integrated with the GE Integrated Function Display™. The CC206s has a different horns from the previous GE locos in Indonesia. While its predecessors use Wabco AA2 with factory note tuned to D, G (play perfect 4th mid C), the CC206 locomotives use Nathan 3rd gen P2 (Bell No. 1&4) with factory note tuned to D, A (play perfect 5th mid C), (Unlike the other P2 using Bell No. 1&2 play minor 3rd).

One CC206 locomotive can haul up to 16 passenger cars or 30 freight cars.

== Allocations ==
Initially, all CC206 of 2013 batch (no. 13 01 – 13 100) and some units of 2015 batch (no. 15 01 – 15 11) were allocated to various motive power depots across Java, while the rest of 2015 batch (no. 15 12 – 15 39) and all of the 2016 batch (no. 16 01 – 16 11) were allocated to Kertapati depot in South Sumatra.

In February 2021, two 2015 batch units (CC206 15 09 and CC206 15 10) of the Sidotopo depot in East Java were transferred to the Kertapati depot. Further two units of 2015 batch (CC206 15 08 and CC206 15 11) from Sidotopo's fleet were transferred to Kertapati in March 2024.

== Accidents ==
- On 12 September 2013, a conflagration destroyed a residence settlement, at Malang. As a consequence, the locomotive numbered CC206 13 16 was burnt. The witness said that the fire started in a house, where someone was cooking and spread from there. After that, the fire flamed and licked a Honda Supra motorcycle parked 2 metres from the stove. Then, the fire burnt all of the kitchen. Because the kitchen distance was just 2 metres from the rail that headed to Pertamina depot, the fire also burnt the CC206 13 16 that was shunting an oil train. The locomotive (CC206 13 16) was heavily damaged on its A-side. All the victims were injured on their feet and faces.
- On 4 April 2014, at 18:30 West Indonesian Time, the Malabar train was derailed at Tasikmalaya, West Java due to a landslide. Finally, the two executive class coaches numbered K1 0 67 27 and K1 0 67 22 and the locomotive numbered CC206 13 55 jumped off completely from the rail. Because of heavy mountainous terrain and inaccessible location, the evacuation of CC206 13 55 was obstructed.
- On 4 May 2014, the locomotive numbered CC206 13 69 and a power car (P 0 08 01) that hauled Bogowonto train was derailed after crashing into a modified container truck at Cirebon, West Java. There were no fatalities, but the locomotive driver and a number of passengers were injured. The incident caused interruption of timetables, and the evacuation ran with difficulties because of the heavy weight of the CC206.
- On 17 October 2023, CC 206 15 05 which was hauling the Argo Semeru Train (Train no. 17) derailed near Kalimenur, Kulon Progo, Special Region of Yogyakarta, The derailment causes the Argo Semeru trainset to be thrown to the side of the rail, sticking out into the oncoming train tracks on the opposite side. Not long after comes the Argo Wilis train (Train no. 6) traveling on the opposite rail, hauled by CC 206 13 53. Because of the braking distance, Argo Wilis hits some of the derailed cars from Argo Semeru. 31 people injured, several railcars and CC 206 13 53 was damaged.

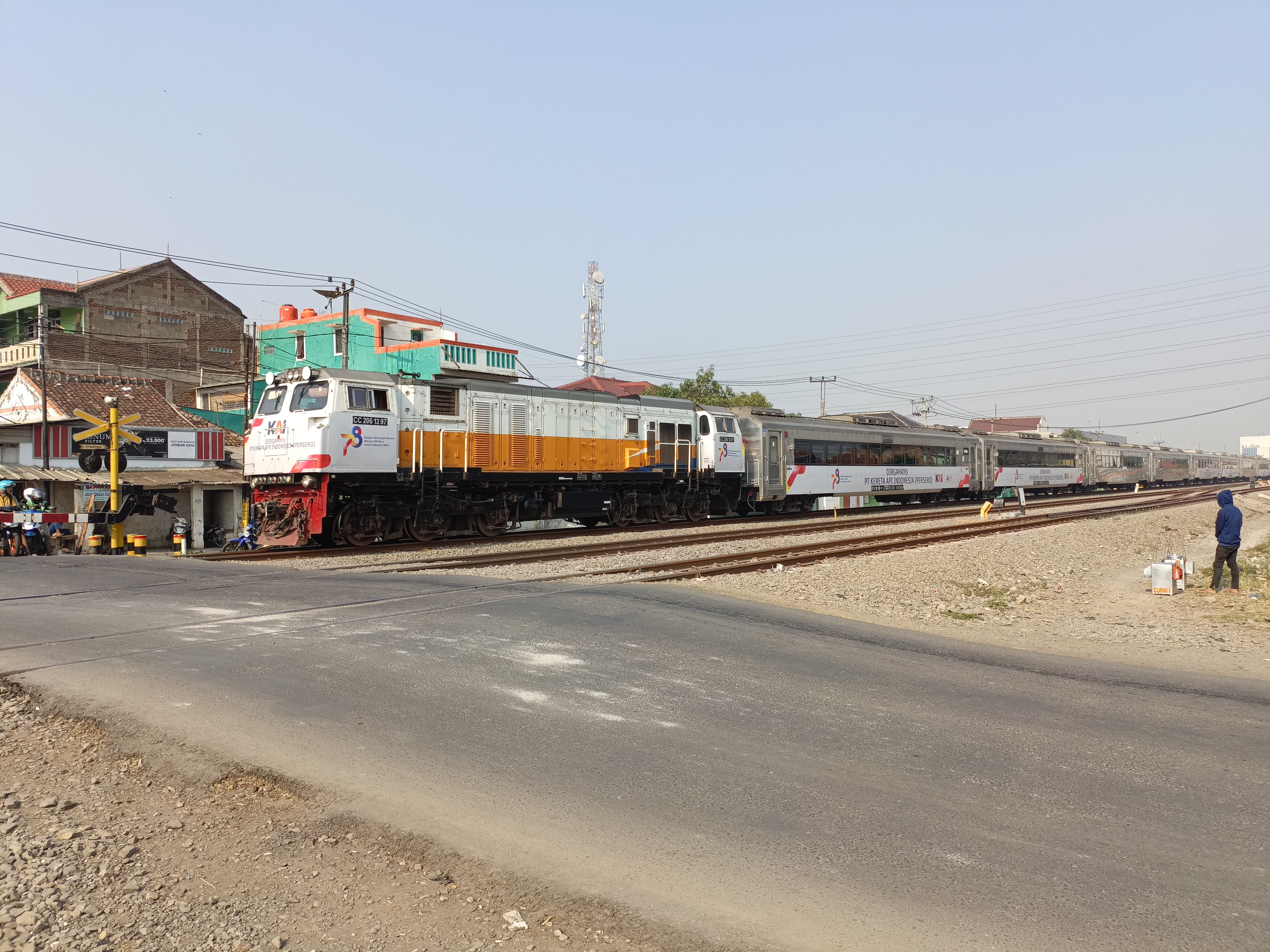
CC206 13 97 BD travelling as Argo Wilis. It is a same locomotive was that involved the 2024 Cicalengka collision

- On 5 January 2024, CC 206 13 97, while handling the Turangga train, collided with CC 201 77 17 and the Commuter Line Bandung Raya the latter was hauling, causing four deaths and 42 injuries. CC 201 77 17 was destroyed, while CC 206 13 97 was slightly damaged with its chassis buckled. As of now it has been confirmed that CC 206 13 97 was written off, becoming the first CC206 to be withdrawn if possible.
- On 27 April 2026, CC 206 13 86, hauling the Argo Bromo Anggrek service numbered KA 4B, collided with the rear of the KRL Commuterline train TM6024F at Bekasi Timur Station. The CC206 locomotive hauling train 4 penetrated approximately halfway into the rear carriage of the commuter train. At least 36 people were injured and 16 were killed as a result of the accident. The locomotive was damaged.

== See also ==
- List of GE locomotives
- Queensland Railways 2800 class
- Blue Tiger
