= 2024 Cicalengka railway collision =

Fatal railway collision in Bandung, Indonesia

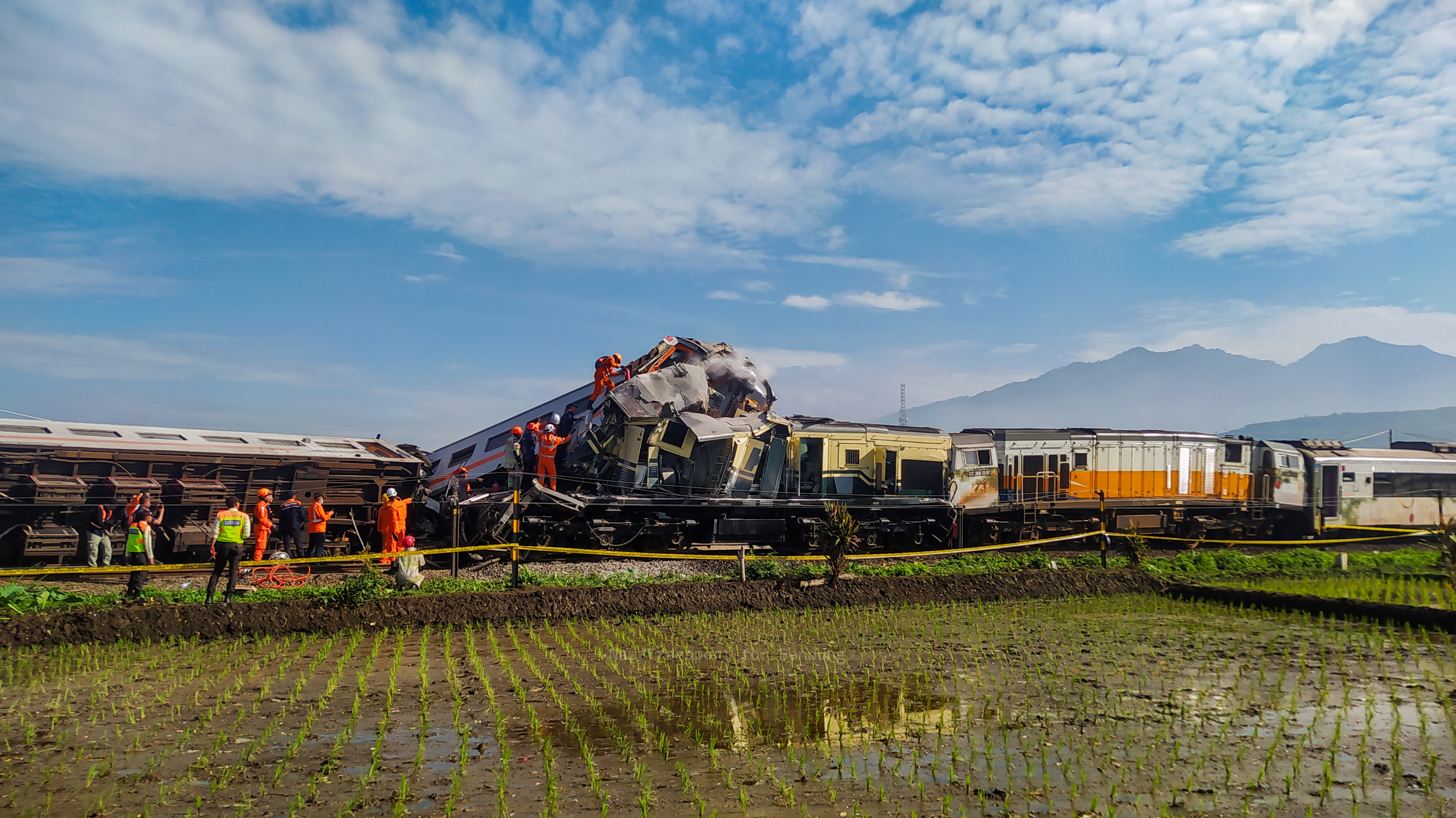
- Turangga train (right) and Commuter Line Bandung Raya (left) that suffered collision in Cicalengka.

Details
- Date: 5 January 2024 c. 6:03 am WIB
- Location: Bandung Regency, West Java
- Coordinates: 06°58′42.11314″S 107°49′38.50028″E
- Country: Indonesia
- Operator: Kereta Api Indonesia
- Incident type: Train collision
- Cause: Uncommanded signal leading to false clear, caused by aging hardware

Statistics
- Trains: 2
- Passengers: 478
- Deaths: 4
- Injured: 42

On 5 January 2024, two trains collided near Cicalengka Station in Bandung Regency, Indonesia, killing four rail employees and injuring 42 others.

== Background ==
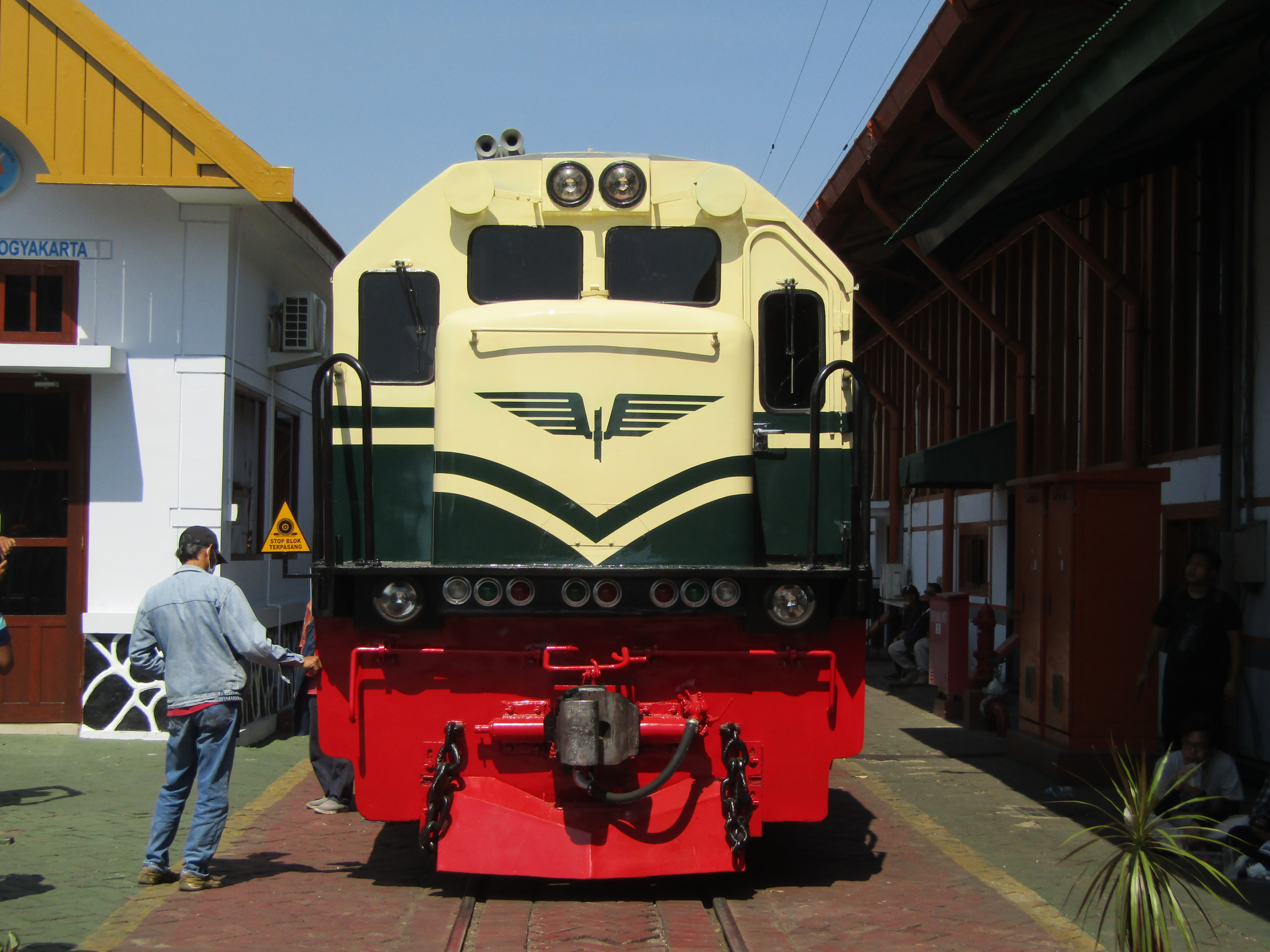
The CC 201 77 17 locomotive involved in the crash

The KA 350 Bandung Raya Commuter Line is a train service that operates on the Padalarang–Cicalengka route, designed as a commuter train. The KA 65A Turangga train is an inter-city train servicing the Surabaya Gubeng–Bandung route.

The section between Haurpugur and Cicalengka, which both trains traverse during their respective routes, has a single track. Therefore, the use of signaling block system is essential on the route. The signaling system in Cicalengka station still use older mechanic system, while the signaling system in Haurpugur station has used newer electric colour light system, creating a difference of system being used. As of early 2024, most single-track train stations in Indonesia still use older mechanic signaling system.

== Incident ==
On 5 January 2024, the dispatcher from Kereta Api Indonesia observed that the Bandung Raya Commuter Line was scheduled to give way for Turangga at Haurpugur train station. The dispatcher communicated this information to the local dispatcher at Cicalengka station. Three minutes later, Cicalengka station attempted to confirm the clearance of the block between Haurpugur and Cicalengka by calling Haurpugur station, receiving no response. Despite the lack of confirmation from Haurpugur station, Cicalengka station deemed the block clear for the Turangga.

At 5:56 a.m., Haurpugur station authorized the departure of the Bandung Raya Commuter Line under the assumption that the block was clear. Haurpugur station didn't report the departure to the central dispatcher.

At 6:03 a.m., the Turangga and the Bandung Raya Commuter Line collided west of Cicalengka station. The Turangga carried 287 passengers, and the Bandung Raya Commuter Line had 191 passengers. The incident resulted in the fatalities of the Commuter Line's driver, assistant driver and an off-duty station security guard, as well as a steward on Turangga. Forty-two people were injured in the incident.

Both trains were badly damaged. On the day of the incident, the Bandung Raya Commuter Line was hauled by CC201 77 17 locomotive sporting special heritage PJKA-era livery. The locomotive involved in the incident is among the oldest CC201 class locomotives in operation in Indonesia, with 47 years of service. The locomotive was damaged beyond repair and withdrawn from the KAI's roster.

== Response ==
The Ministry of Transportation of Indonesia stated that double track construction had been planned on the Padalarang–Cicalengka route, which is scheduled to finish in 2024.

== Gallery ==
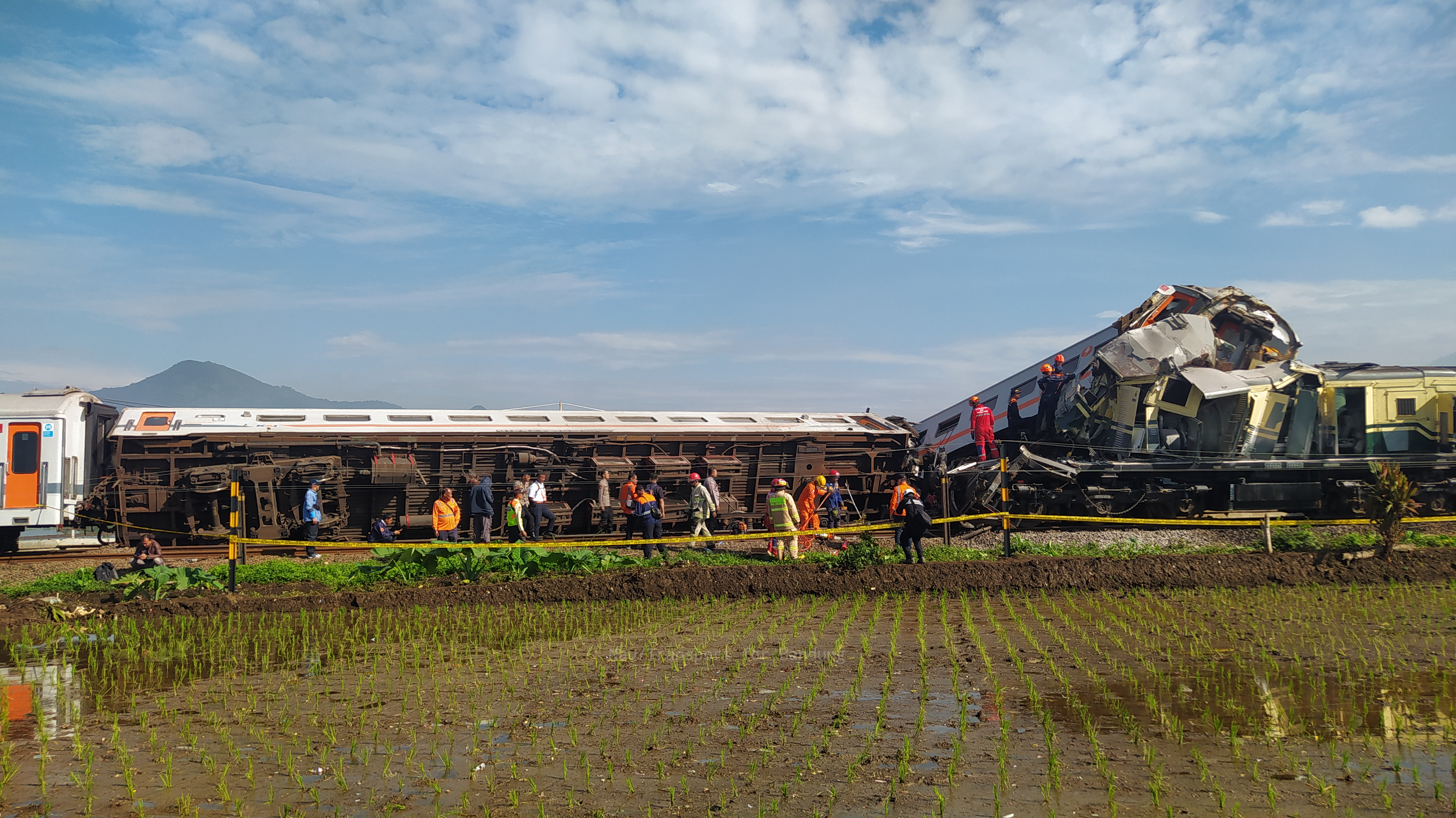
Aftermath of the crash.

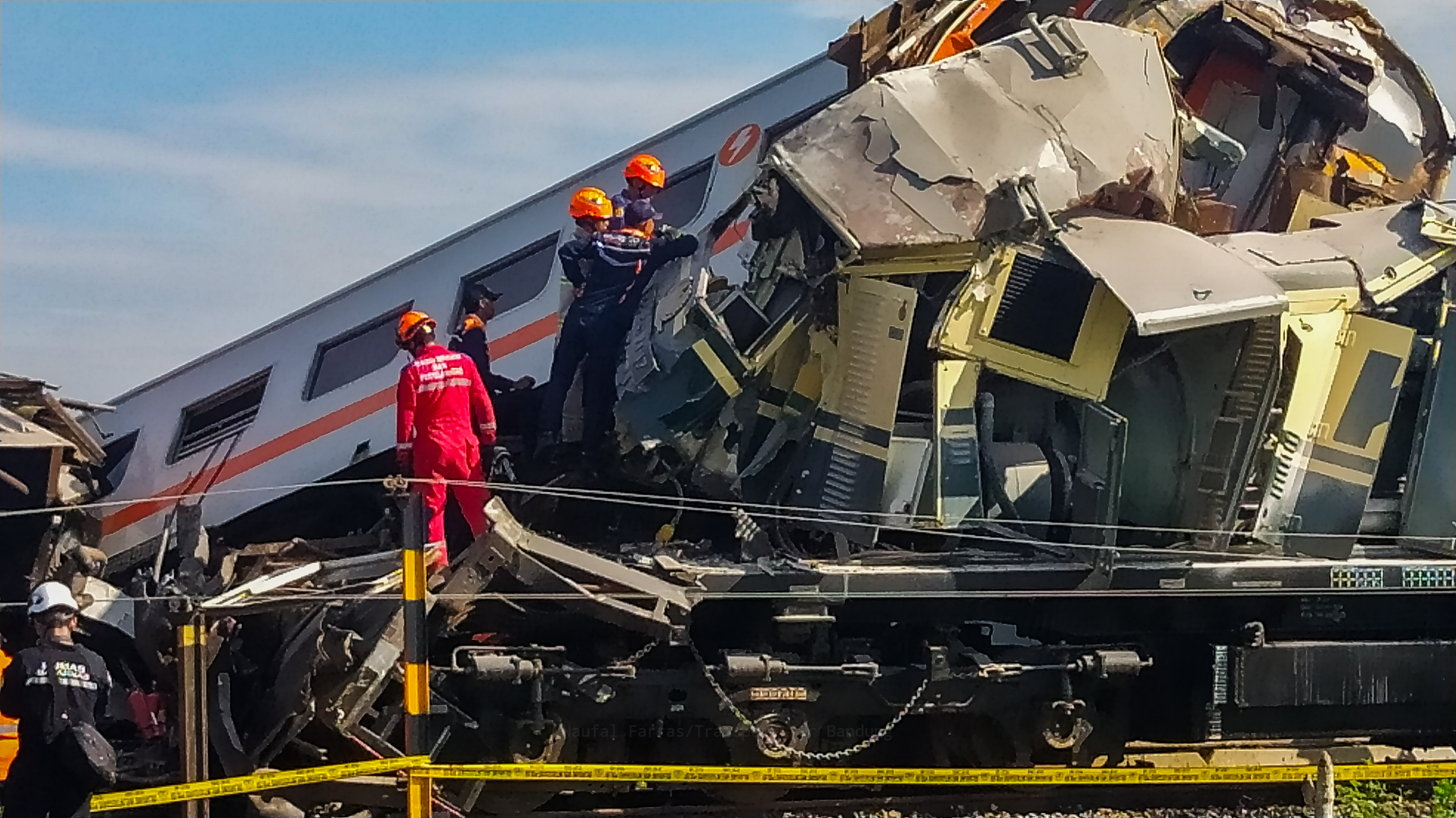
CC201 77 17 locomotive condition after crash.

== See also ==
- 1987 Bintaro train crash
- List of rail accidents (2020–present)
