= Diesel Loco Shed, Gooty =

Loco shed in Andhra Pradesh, India

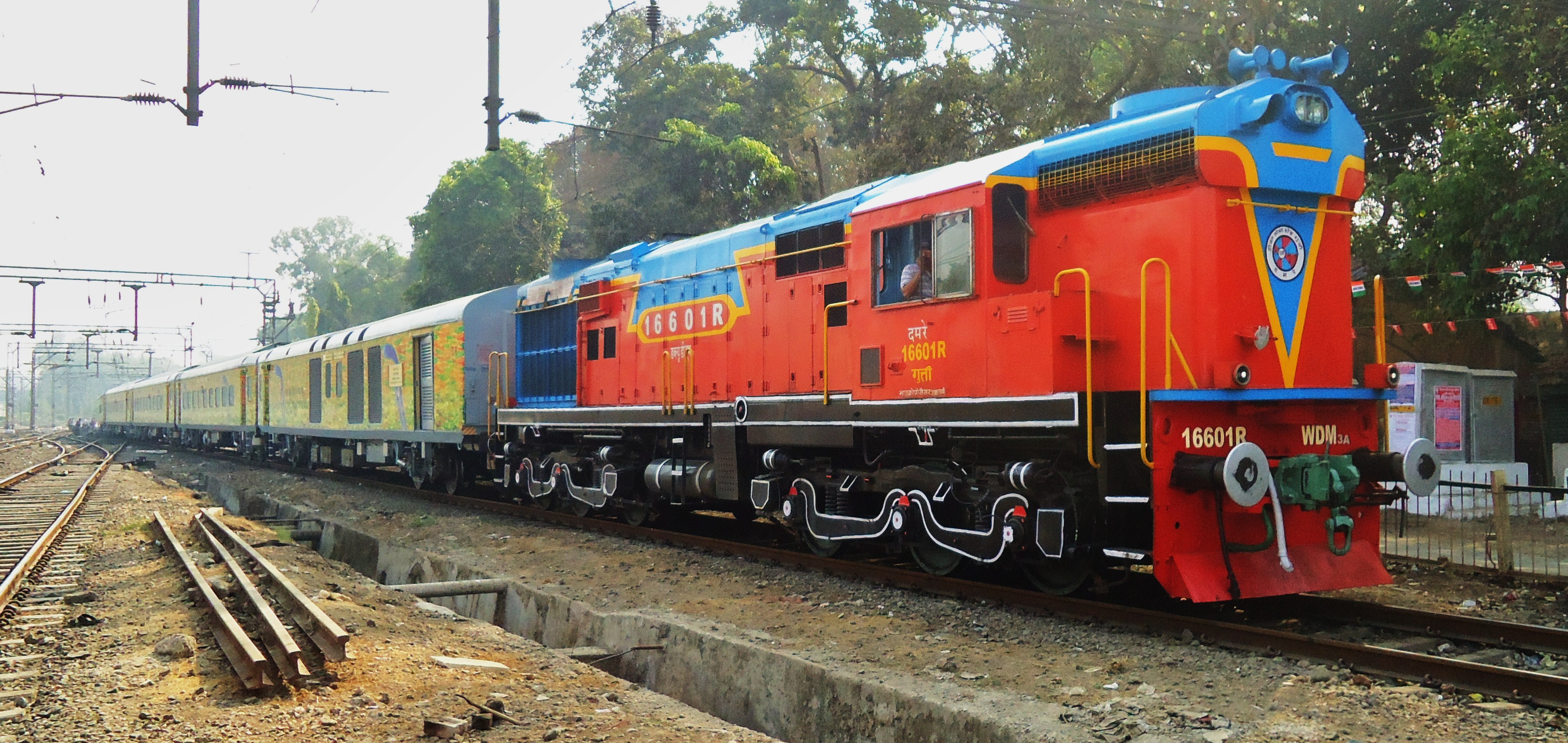
- A Gooty-based WDM-3A in Kingfisher livery

- Location within Andhra Pradesh

Location
- Location: Gooty, Andhra Pradesh, India
- Coordinates: 15.121°N 77.634°E

Characteristics
- Owner: Indian Railways
- Operator: South Coast Railway zone
- Depot code: GY
- Type: Engine shed
- Roads: 6
- Rolling stock: WDP-4D; WDG-4; WDG-4G; WDG-6G; WAG-9

History
- Opened: 5 December 1963; 62 years ago

Diesel Loco Shed, Gooty is an engine shed located in Gooty, Andhra Pradesh in India. It falls under the jurisdiction of Guntakal railway division of South Coast Railway zone

== History ==
Diesel Loco Shed, Gooty was originally established as a steam locomotive shed. After the introduction of diesel traction on Indian Railways, it was converted to a diesel locomotive shed and inaugurated on 5 December 1963, making it the first diesel shed in the Southern region.

The shed was initially a part of Southern Railway; however, it was transferred to South Central Railway on 2 October 1977 when the Guntakal railway division was merged into it.

== Operations ==
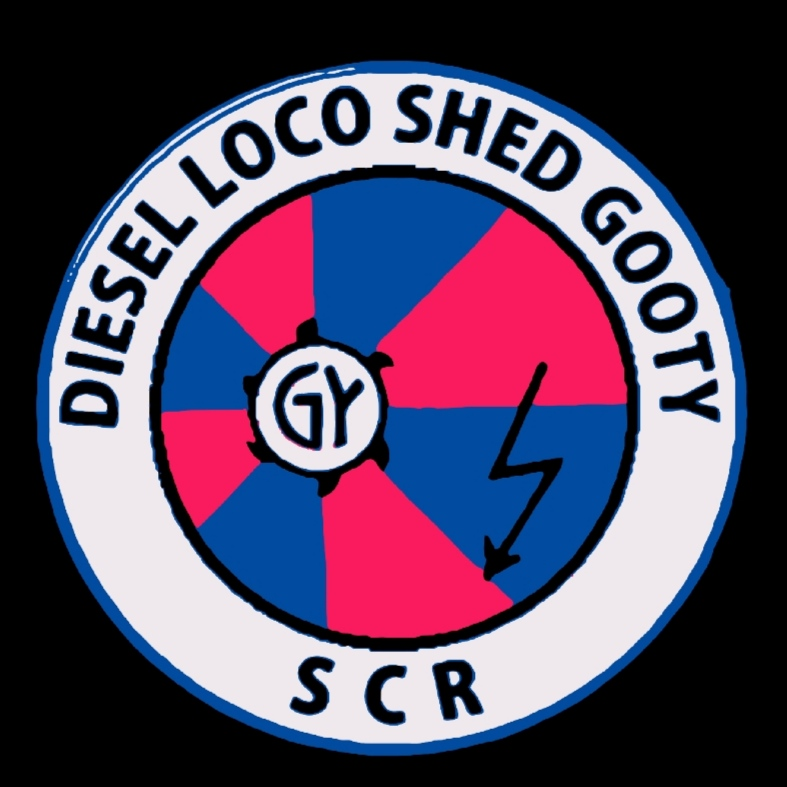
Gooty Loco Shed logo

The Gooty Diesel Loco Shed is one of India's largest locomotive sheds, with over 400 locos. It handles routine maintenance for WDG-4 and WDP-4 locos.

In 2016, the shed was allotted with WDG-5 locomotives, which were just power-tweaked variants of the WDG-4. Based on the SD80MAC, these locomotives were equipped with a 20-cylinder version of the 710 prime mover and had a higher power output of 5,500 hp (4.1 MW). 3 units – 50003, 50004 and 50005 – were assigned, but were only homed until December 2017 due to maintenance difficulties. After this, they were sent to the Sabarmati Shed (SBT) of the Western Railway to be homed with other locos of the same class.

In 2023, the shed received new-generation 4,500 hp (3.4 MW) WDG-4G and 6,000 hp (4.5 MW) WDG-6G locomotives. Based on the GE Evolution Series platform, these new locomotives have completely replaced its ageing ALCO DL560C fleet. This made it the third shed in the entire IR network, after Roza (ROZA) and Gandhidham (GIMB), and the first one in South India, to home these locos.

== Locomotives ==
Serial no.	Locomotive class	Horsepower	Quantity
1.	WDG-4/4D	4000/4500	4
2.	WDP-4/4D	4000/4500	18
3.	WDG-4G	4500	118
4.	WDG-6G	6000	132
5.	WAG-9	6120	130
Total active locomotives as of February 2026			403
