= Diesel Loco Shed, Siliguri =

Loco shed in West Bengal, India

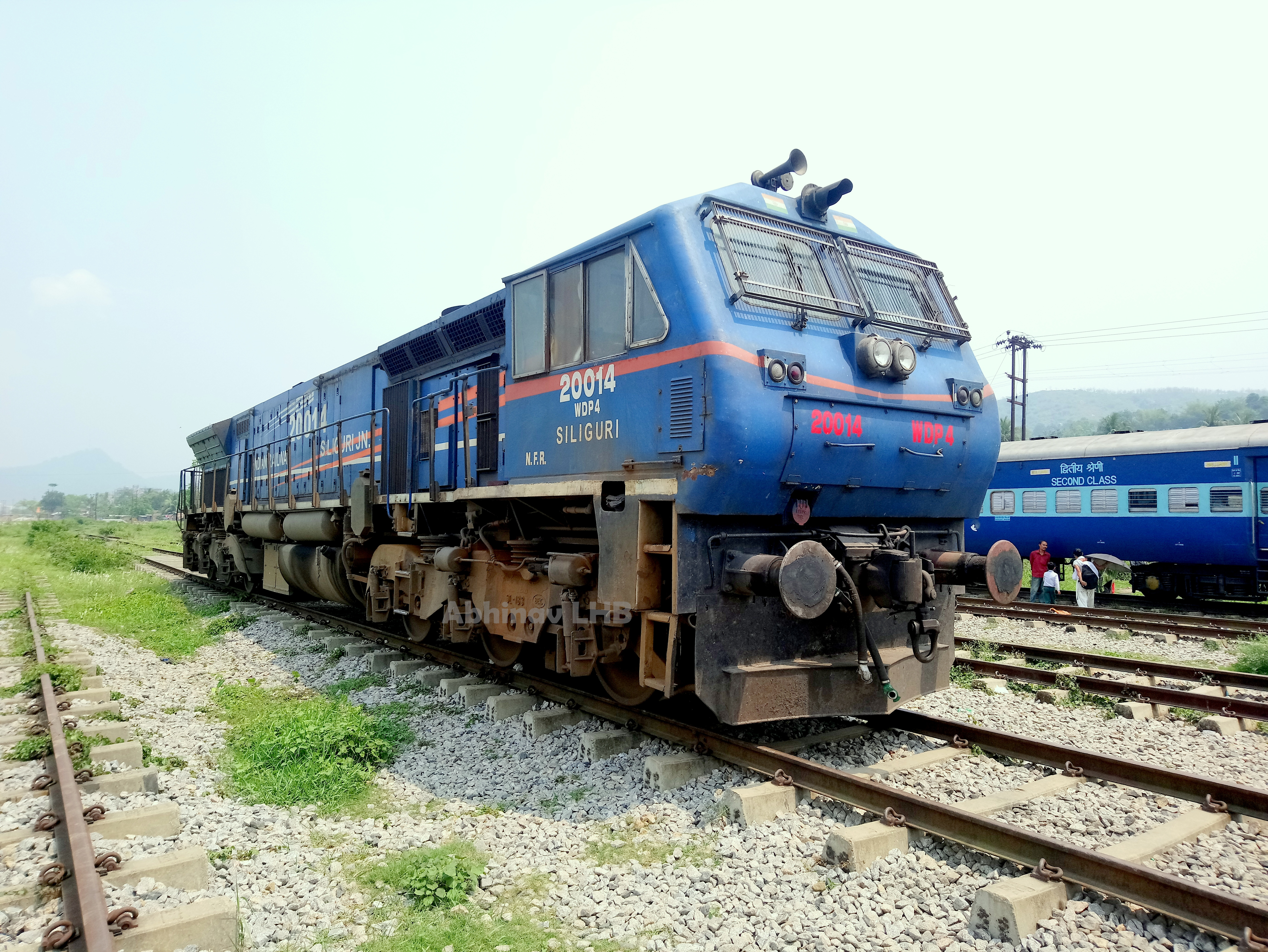
- A Siliguri-based WDP-4 at New Guwahati City

- Location within West Bengal

Location
- Location: Siliguri, Darjeeling, West Bengal
- Coordinates: 26.7234°N 88.4138°E

Characteristics
- Owner: Indian Railways
- Operator: Northeast Frontier Railway zone
- Depot code: SGUJ
- Type: Locomotive shed
- Roads: 6
- Rolling stock: WDP-4 / WDP-4B / WDP-4D; WDG-4 / WDG-4D; WAP-7; WAG-9; WDG-4G; WDG-6G

History
- Opened: Metre-gauge: 26 January 1962; 64 years ago; Broad-gauge: 13 January 2007; 19 years ago

The Diesel Loco Shed, Siliguri is a motive power depot performing locomotive maintenance and repair work for diesel locomotives of the Indian Railways. Located at the Siliguri Junction (SGUJ) in Siliguri, West Bengal, it is one of the three diesel loco sheds under Northeast Frontier Railway zone.

== Operations ==
Like all locomotive sheds, Siliguri does regular maintenance, overhaul and repair (including painting and washing) of locomotives. It not only attends to locomotives housed at Siliguri but also to the ones coming in from other sheds. The shed has a sanctioned homing capacity of 100 locomotives and four pit lines for loco repair. In 2026, it was allotted the new 4,500 HP (3.4 MW) WDG-4G and 6,000 HP (4.5 MW) WDG-6G locomotives of the GE Evolution Series, making it the fourth shed in Indian Railways (after Roza, Gandhidham and Gooty) and the first one in Northeast India, to home these locomotives.

== Livery & Markings ==
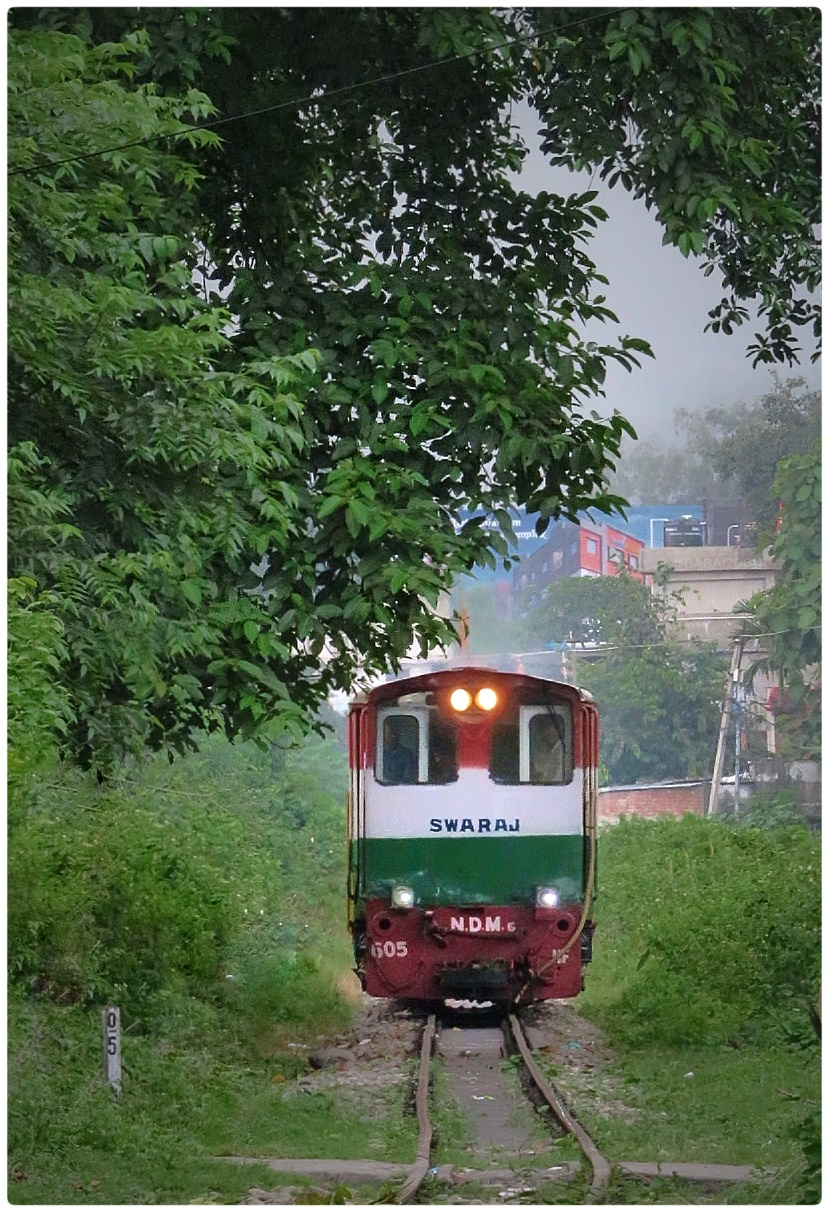
#605 Swaraj: The first tricolor NG loco of Siliguri DLS

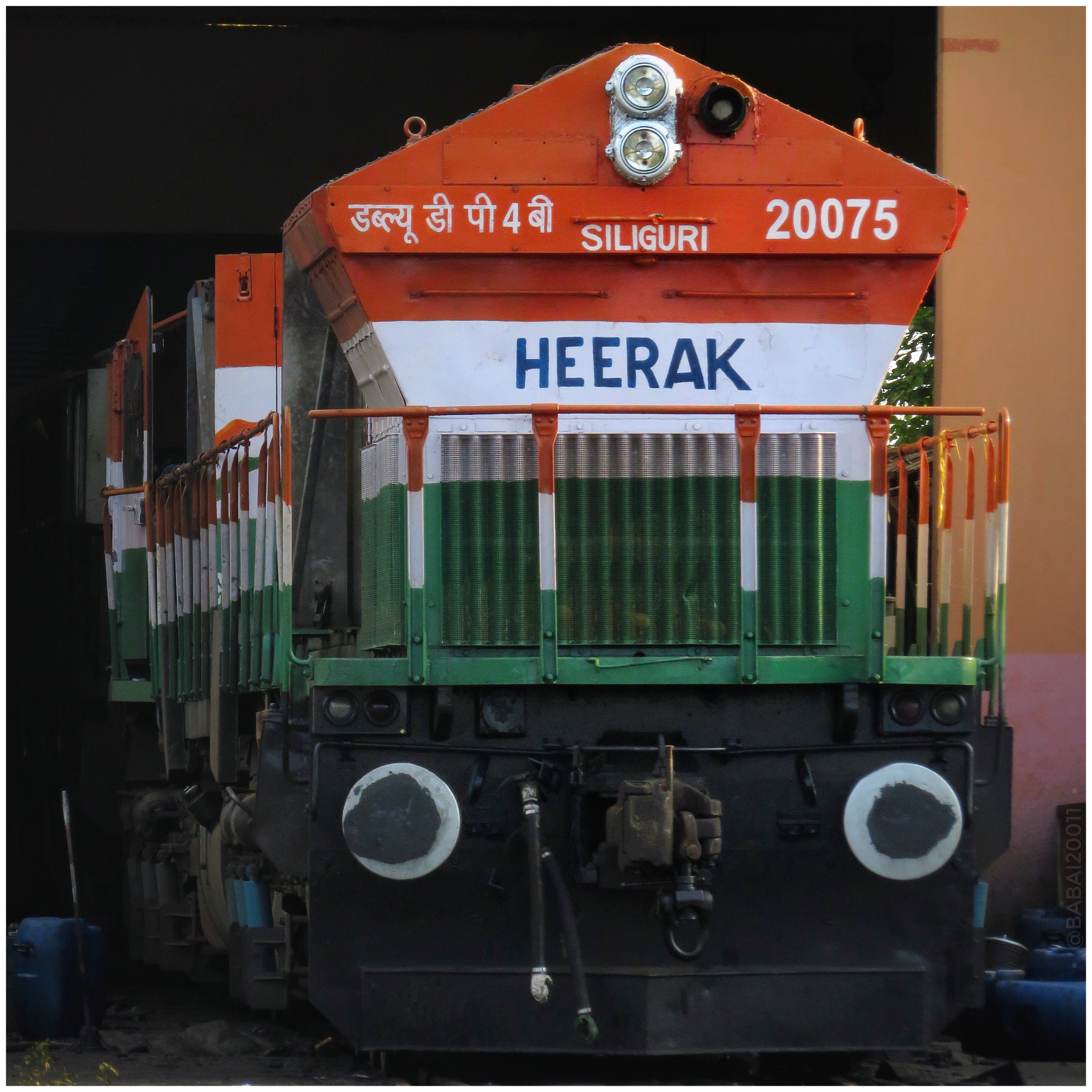
#20075 Heerak (WDG 4B): The first tricolor EMD loco of Siliguri DLS (now homed at New Guwahati)

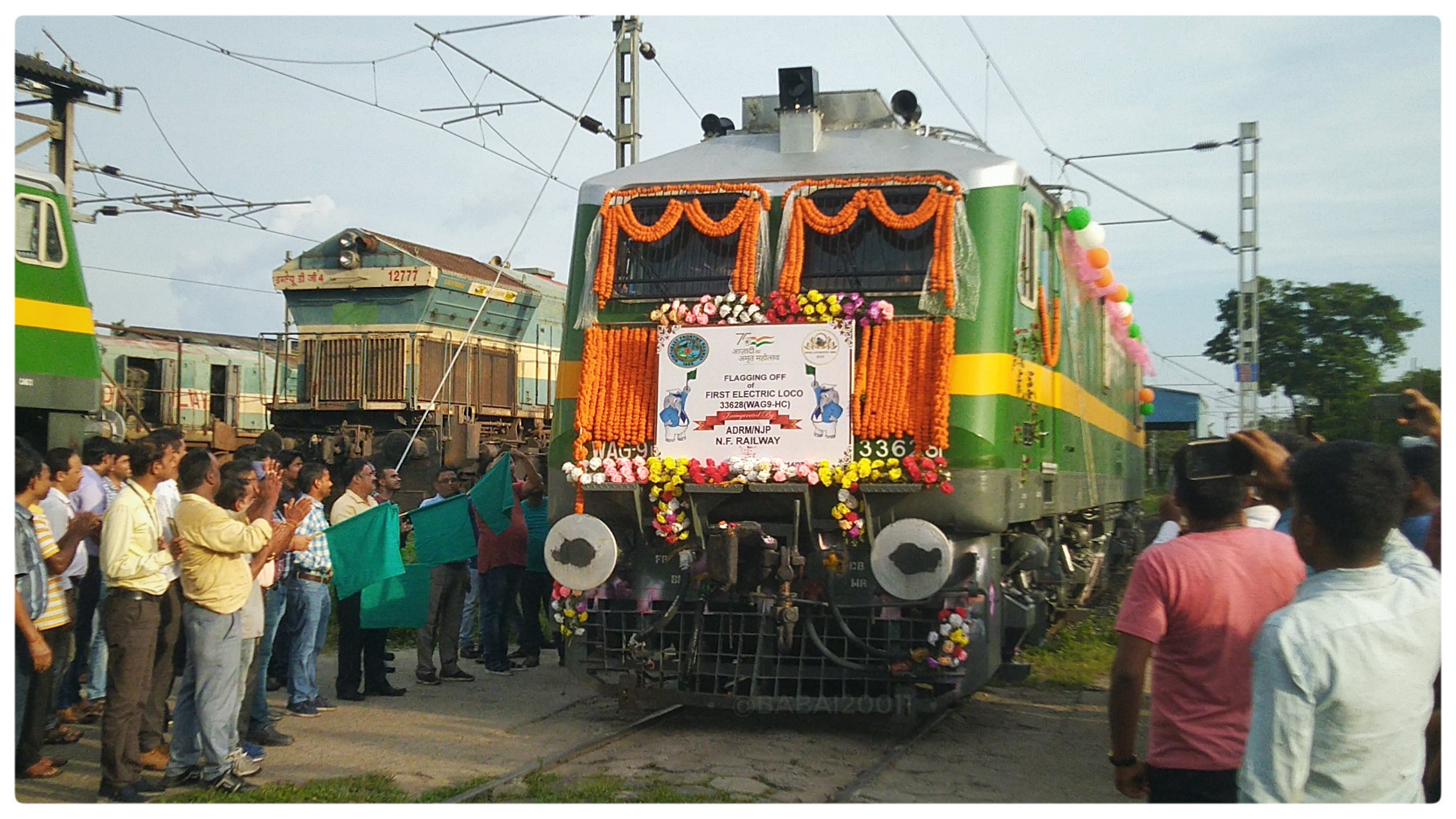
#33628 (WAG9 HC): The first electric loco of Siliguri DLS

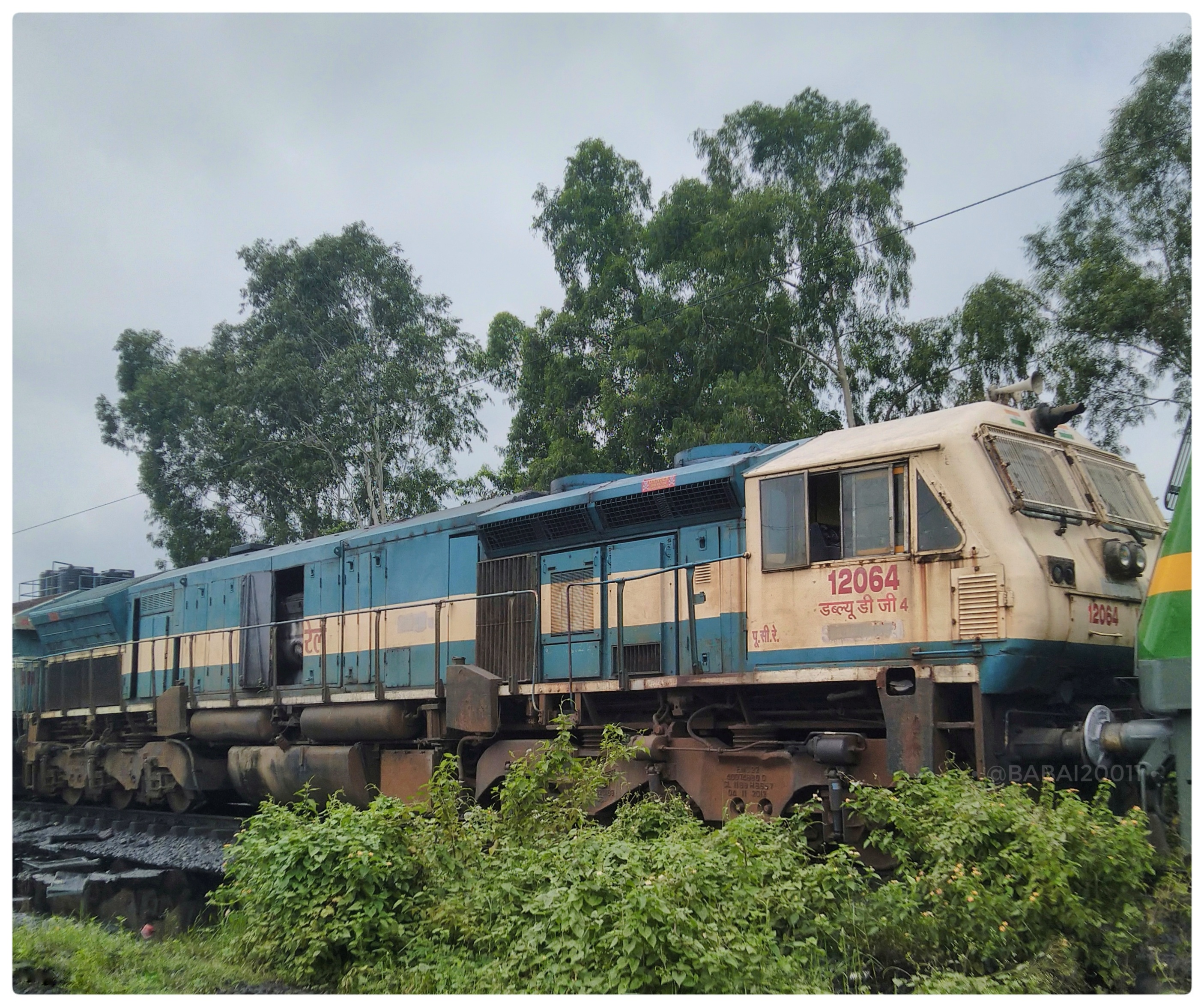
#12064 (WDG4): The first EMD loco of Siliguri DLS

SGUJ has its own livery on WDP-4, it has navy blue, light yellow band and black.

SGUJ has its own stencils and logo. It is written in both Hindi and English in bold letters.

SGUJ DLS was renaming some EMD locos for promoting the culture and tourism of Northeast India which is proposed by NF Rail Enthusiasts group.

The WAG-9 HC of this shed are green with a yellow band and locomotive number written on the band in dark blue or black colour. The name "Siliguri" is written on the locomotive body just below the band.

The WAP-7 of this shed are white with a red band and locomotive number written on the band in black colour. The name "Siliguri" is also written on the locomotive body below the band.

=== Broad Gauge ===
- 20075 - Heerak (now homed at New Guwahati)
- 40023 - Netaji (Tricolour)
- 40096 - Jaldapara
- 40383 - Baghajatin (Tricolour striped)
- 40404 - Ramanujan (Tricolour striped)
- 40436 - Gaj Prahari
- 38130 - Trisrota
- 38135 - Deshbandhu

=== Narrow gauge ===
- 601 - Kanchanjungha
- 602 - Himalaya
- 603 - Tridhara
- 604 - Sherpa
- 605 - Swaraj (Tricolour)

== Locomotives ==
Serial No.	Locomotive Class	Horsepower	Quantity
1.	WDG-4/4D	4000/4500	156
2.	WDP-4/4B/4D	4000/4500	63
3.	WAP-7	6350	53
4.	WAG-9H	6120	13
5.	WDG-4G	4500	26
6.	WDG-6G	6000	18
Total active locomotives as of March 2026			319
