= Indian locomotive class WDG-6G =

Indian Railways freight class diesel electric locomotive

WDG-6G
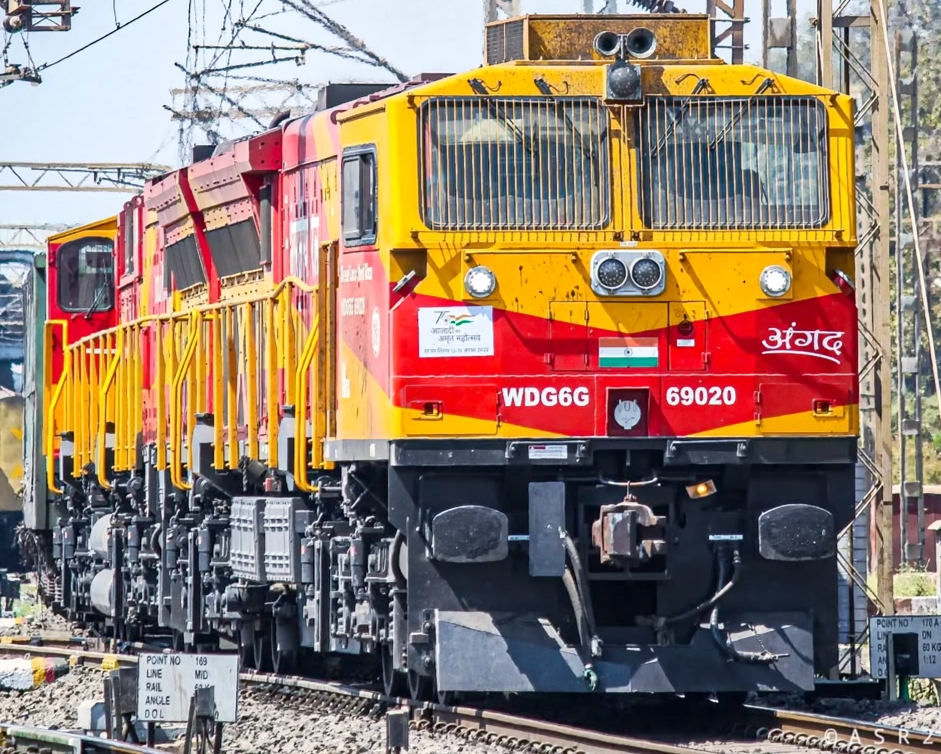
- Roza based WDG-6G twins at Bilaspur
Type and origin
- Power type: Diesel–electric
- Designer: GE Transportation India, Bengaluru
- Builder: GE Transportation, Erie, Pennsylvania, Diesel Locomotive Factory, Marhowrah
- Model: ES57ACi
- Build date: 2019 – present
- Total produced: 223 as of August 2026
Specifications
- Configuration
  - Commonwealth: Co-Co
- Gauge: 1,676 mm (5 ft 6 in)
- Bogies: Co-Co Fabricated Bogie
- Wheel diameter: New: 1,092 mm (43.0 in); Condemned: 1,016 mm (40.0 in)
- Minimum curve: 174 m (571 ft) radius
- Wheelbase: 1,900 mm (6 ft 3 in)
- Pivot centres: 14,224 mm (46 ft 8.0 in)
- Length
  - Over couplers: 22,313 mm (73 ft 2.5 in)
- Width: 3,200 mm (10 ft 6 in)
- Height: 4,227 mm (13 ft 10.4 in)
- Axle load: 23 t (23 long tons; 25 short tons)
- Loco weight: 138 t (136 long tons; 152 short tons)
- Fuel type: Diesel
- Fuel capacity: 8,300 L (1,800 imp gal; 2,200 US gal)
- Lubricant cap.: 1,300 L (290 imp gal; 340 US gal)
- Coolant cap.: 1,468 L (323 imp gal; 388 US gal)
- Sandbox cap.: 170 L (37 imp gal; 45 US gal)
- Prime mover: GE GEVO-16
- RPM
  - Maximum RPM: 1,050 rpm
- Engine type: V16 Diesel engine, 4-stroke engine
- Aspiration: turbocharged
- Displacement: 15.7L per cylinder
- Alternator: 5GDY131B
- Traction motors: 5GEB32B5 AC traction motors
- Cylinders: 16
- Cylinder size: 250 mm × 320 mm (9.8 in × 12.6 in)
- Transmission: diesel electric
- Gear ratio: 85:16
- MU working: Yes, AAR Type
- Loco brake: Air, Dynamic Brake
- Train brakes: Air
- Compressor: 178 CFM @ 145-psig
- Couplers: CBC AAR Type-E
Performance figures
- Maximum speed: 100 km/h (62 mph)
- Power output: 6,000 hp (4,500 kW)
- Tractive effort
  - Starting: 570 kN (130,000 lb_{f})
  - Continuous: 420 kN (94,000 lb_{f})
- Brakeforce: 290 kN (65,000 lb_{f})
Career
- Operators: Indian Railways
- Numbers: 69001+
- Nicknames: ANGAD
- Locale: All over India
- Disposition: Active

The Indian locomotive class WDG-6G (GE ES57ACi) is a class of diesel–electric locomotive used by the Indian Railways for freight duty. The locomotive is a higher power variant of the WDG-4G locomotive which was also designed by General Electric. The design platform is based on the GE Evolution Series and features a 4-stroke 16-cylinder fully turbocharged engine which delivers around 6,000 hp (4,500 kW), making it the most powerful diesel locomotive of IR (the second being its WDG-5 predecessor). It is the only 6,000 hp diesel electric locomotive at 23t axle load, making it the lightest locomotive in its category in the world. This locomotive, has been named as "Angad" after the character of the same name from the Hindu Epic Ramayana.

== Import and manufacture ==
Two units were produced by Wabtec's plant in Pennsylvania, United States, and delivered to India in 2019. Initially, a few will be made in USA. Under the 'Make in India' initiative of Indian Government, GE will manufacture all remaining units at its factory in Marhowra, Bihar. GE has also built maintenance sheds at Roza in UP and Gandhidham in Gujarat.

== Field trials ==
The first two locomotives in the series, 69001 and 69002, were recently sent to South Central Railways' Maula Ali (MLY) Diesel Locomotive Shed. The locos underwent Confirmatory Oscillograph Car Run (COCR) trials on the Vikarabad – Parli Vaijnath section of South Central Railway and were approved by Research Design and Standards Organisation for further field trials on the Dedicated Freight Corridor by Roza Locomotive Shed.

== Locomotive sheds ==
Zone	Name	Shed code	Quantity
Northern Railway	Roza	ROZD	25
Western Railway	Gandhidham	GDLG	37
South Coast Railway	Gooty	GYD	132
Northeast Frontier Railway	Siliguri	SGUD	45
Total Locomotives Active as of November 2026			239

== See also ==
- Indian locomotive class WDG-4G
- List of diesel locomotives of India
- Indian Railways
- Rail transport in India
