= OCPL =

OCPL may refer to:

- Office of Communications and Public Liaison, within the office of the director of the U.S. National Institutes of Health
- Odisha Coal and Power Limited, a mining company owned by Government of Odisha, India
- Onondaga County Public Library, a consolidated county library in Onondaga County, New York
- Orange County Public Library (California)
