= High Density Network (Indian Railways) =

Group of high density corridors of Indian Railways

High Density Network (HDN) is a group of seven high density railway corridors of the Indian Railways. Together, these corridors account for approximately 16 percent of the total route length of the Indian Railways but handle about 41 percent of its combined rail traffic.

== Overview ==
Indian Railways has classified seven high density railway corridors as the High Density Network (HDN). These corridors span 11,051 km (6,867 mi), connecting the major cities of Chennai, Delhi, Guwahati, Kolkata, and Mumbai. The HDN corridors account for approximately 16 percent of the total route length of the Indian Railways but handle about 41 percent of its combined rail traffic. Along with the Highly Utilised Network, which covers a further 23,000 km (14,000 mi), these networks carry an estimated 96% of the total traffic of the Indian Railways while accounting for about half of its total route length.

== Corridors ==
List of corridors
Name	Corridor	Zone(s)	Major stations	Route length (km)					
Name	Corridor	Zone(s)	Major stations	Single line	Double line	Triple line	Quadruple line	Penta/Hexa line	Total
HDN-1	Delhi–Howrah	NCR, ECR, ER	Dankuni Jn., Asansol Jn., Dhanbad Jn., Prayagraj Jn., Kanpur Central	—N/a	948.00	280.75	186.61	6.57	1,421.93
HDN-2	Howrah–Mumbai	CR, SECR, SER	Kharagpur Jn., Tatanagar Jn., Jharsuguda Jn., Bilaspur Jn., Nagpur Jn., Bhusaval Jn., Igatpuri	—N/a	1,123.10	704.00	211.67	—N/a	2,038.77
HDN-3	Mumbai–Delhi	NCR, WCR, WR	Surat, Godhra Jn., Ratlam Jn., Nagda Jn., Sawai Madhopur Jn., Mathura Jn.	—N/a	1,176.64	4.01	125.91	13.97	1,320.53
HDN-4	Delhi–Guwahati	NR, NER, ECR, NFR	Moradabad, Roza Jn., Gonda Jn., Gorakhpur Jn., Katihar Jn., New Jalpaiguri Jn., Rangiya Jn.	250.32	1,612.26	12.34	—N/a	—N/a	1,874.92
HDN-5	Delhi–Chennai	NR, NCR, WCR, CR, SCR	Mathura Jn., Jhansi Jn., Bina Jn., Bhopal Jn., Nagpur Jn., Balharshah Jn., Vijayawada Jn.	—N/a	1,120.97	899.53	17.95	2.22	2,040.67
HDN-6	Chennai–Howrah	ER, SER, ECoR, SCR	Kharagpur Jn., Bhadrak, Visakhapatnam Jn., Vijayawada Jn.	—N/a	988.85	111.00	17.00	—N/a	1,116.85
HDN-7	Mumbai–Chennai	CR, SCR, SR	Pune Jn., Solapur, Guntakal Jn., Arakkonam Jn.	—N/a	1,143.30	28.00	66.26	—N/a	1,237.56
Total				250.32	8,113.12	2,039.63	625.40	22.76	11,051.23

== Utilisation ==
The concentration of traffic has resulted in significant capacity constraints across the HDN. According to the Indian Railway Board data as of December 2024, only 4.6% of HDN route-km operated below 80% of charted line capacity, while approximately 44% operated above 120%, indicating substantial saturation on many sections. Certain sections experience severe congestion such as the Karjat–Lonavala section of the Mumbai–Chennai line, which has been reported to operate at more than 167 percent of charted capacity.

Utilisation of HDN
Utilisation band	Route length (km)	Share of HDN
Less than 80%	518.9	4.6%
80–100%	2,088.0	18.89%
100–120%	3,619.0	32.75%
120–150%	3,263.9	29.53%
More than 150%	1,560.1	14.11%

== Infrastructure ==
Given their economic importance, Indian Railways has undertaken comprehensive capacity assessments and infrastructure upgrades such as track doubling and expansion, electrification, and the installation of automatic signalling systems. As of July 2026, Kavach, an indigenous automatic train protection system, has been commissioned across about 2,490 route-km on the Delhi–Mumbai and Delhi–Howrah corridors.

Mission Raftar is an initiative of the Indian Railways aimed at increasing permissible train speeds across the national railway network. Under the programme, selected HDN corridors, including the Delhi–Mumbai corridor, have been identified for infrastructure upgrades to enable speeds of up to 160 km/h (99 mph). Dedicated Freight Corridors spanning more than 3,000 km (1,900 mi) are being constructed to enable faster freight movement while reducing freight traffic on existing HDN routes, thereby releasing capacity for passenger services. Indian Railways has also announced plans to quadruple the entire HDN network, creating four-line corridors to further increase capacity for passenger and freight operations.

== See also ==
- Rail transport in India
