= Indian locomotive class WDG-5 =

Indian railways locomotive class

WDG-5
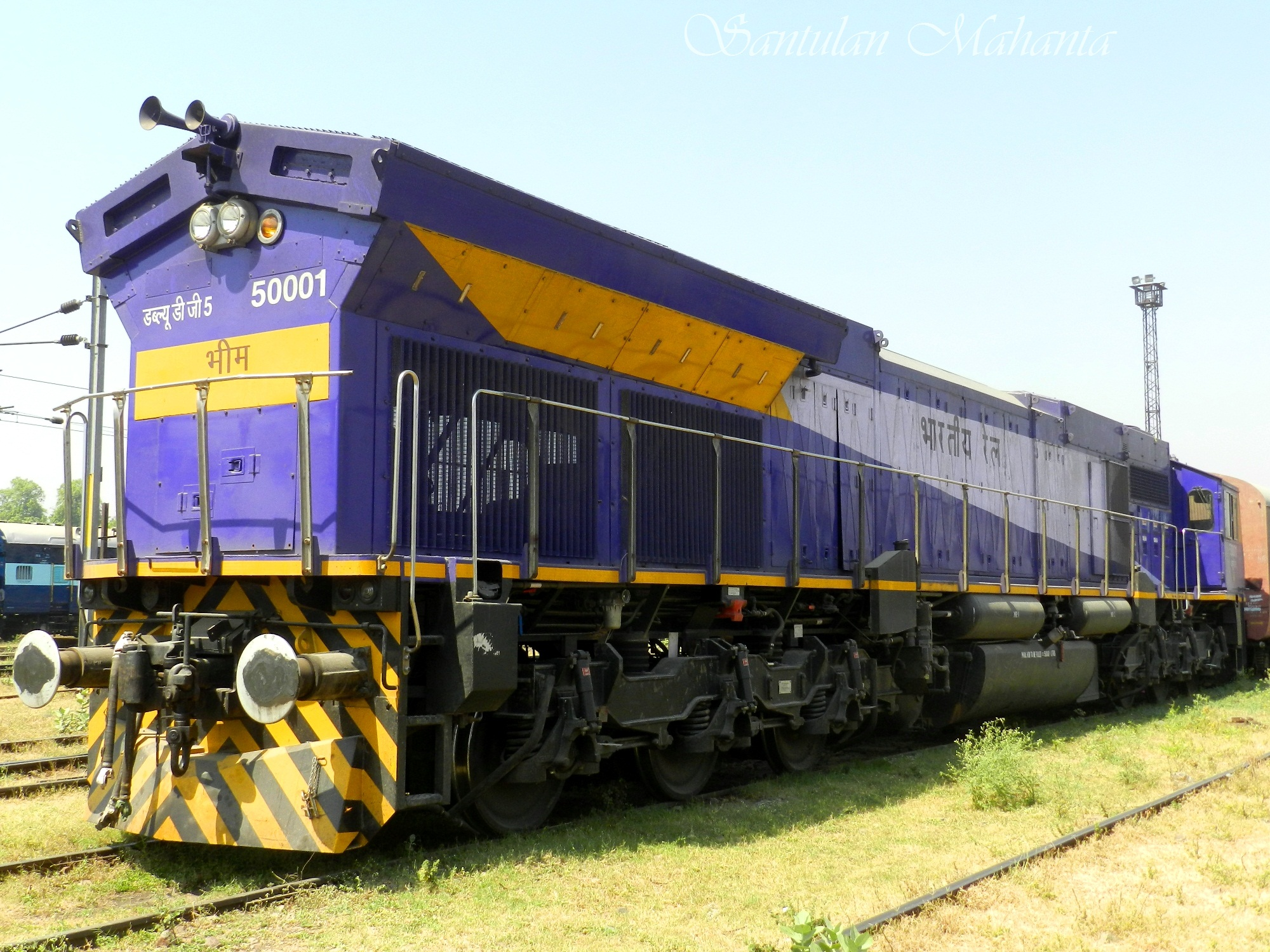
- Sabarmati based GT50AC - WDG-5 named "BHEEM"
Type and origin
- Power type: Diesel–electric
- Designer: RDSO, EMD
- Builder: BLW, EMD
- Model: EMD GT50AC
- Build date: 2012–2018
- Total produced: 7
Specifications
- Configuration
  - Commonwealth: Co-Co
- Gauge: 1,676 mm (5 ft 6 in)
- Bogies: HTCF Bogie
- Pivot centres: 14,610 mm (47.93 ft)
- Length
  - Over couplers: 22,262 mm (73.038 ft)
  - Over beams: 20,880 mm (68.50 ft)
- Width: 3,250 mm (10.66 ft)
- Height: 4,382 mm (14.377 ft)
- Axle load: 22.3 t (21.9 LT; 24.6 short tons)
- Loco weight: 134 t (132 LT; 148 short tons)
- Fuel type: Diesel fuel
- Fuel capacity: 7500 Litres
- Prime mover: EMD 20N-710G3B-EC (V20 engine)
- RPM range: 200-950
- Engine type: Two-stroke diesel engine
- Aspiration: Turbo-supercharger
- Alternator: EMD TA20-CA9
- Traction motors: EMD A 2921-6
- Cylinders: 20
- Transmission: Diesel–electric AC–AC IGBT Microprocessor Controlled
- Gear ratio: 20:91
- MU working: AAR
- Loco brake: Air Brake, Dynamic Brake, Hand Brake
- Train brakes: Air Brakes
- Couplers: Buffers and chain coupler, CBC coupler
Performance figures
- Maximum speed: 100 km/h (62 mph)
- Tractive effort
  - Starting: 560 kN (125,893.01 lb_{f})
  - Continuous: 405 kN (91,047.62 lb_{f})
- Dynamic brake peak effort: 270 kN (60,698.41 lb_{f})
Career
- Operators: Indian Railways
- Numbers: 50001-50007
- Nicknames: BHEEM
- Locale: India

The Indian locomotive class WDG-5 (EMD GT50AC) is a class of heavy haul Diesel–electric locomotive built by Banaras Locomotive Works, Varanasi in collaboration with Electro-Motive Diesel. At a rated power output of 5,500 horsepower (4,100 kW), it is the second most powerful diesel locomotive class on Indian Railways, just out-powered by the 6,000 horsepower (4,500 kW) WDG-6G. Derived from the EMD SD80MAC, it was meant as a direct upgrade to the WDG-4 aka GT46MAC (an SD70MAC derivative). The locomotive series is named Bheem, after the strong Pandav brother from epic Mahabharata. The loco has the two-stroke Turbocharged EMD 20N-710G3B-EC (20 cylinder engine) of the EMD SD80MAC and an AC-AC transmission. Since the loco has been developed by installing a v20-710 prime mover and replacing the standard v16 in the WDG4 GT46MAC locomotive, the model was re-designated by adding 4 to the predecessor model, with GT-46 becoming GT-50, owing to the number of cylinders going from 16 to 20, thereby making it the First EMD locomotive in the GT-series to use a v20-710 engine.

The class was stopped only with seven units due to poor tractive effort – it provided only 560 kilonewtons, which is just 20 kilonewtons more than the WDG-4. Also, the v20-710 powerpack having high fuel consumption, similar to why the original SD80MAC were discontinued and were ultimately scrapped. Compounding the issue was Indian Railways aiming for complete network electrification as part of the Net Zero-Carbon Emission programme, during which it discontinued building EMD 710 locomotives and transitioned to greener diesel locomotives based on General Electric (GE)'s GEvo Evolution Series platform. Examples of such are the 4,500 hp (3.4 MW) WDG-4G (GE ES43ACmi) that uses the 12-cylinder version of the GEvo Prime Mover, and the 6,000 hp (4.5 MW) WDG-6G (GE ES57ACi) that uses the 16-cylinder version of the same engine.

As of July 2025, only 3 locomotives of this class - 50001, 50005 and 50006, are in active service, and too are to be retired soon with the other 4 units - 50002, 50003, 50004, and 50007 that have been retired and kept in storage in SBT shed, due to unavailability of spare parts.

As of September 2026, 2 units, 50003 and 50007, have returned to active service, as they have been refurbished at the Sabarmati Shed, but by de-rating them by replacing their v20-710 powerpack with the v16-710 powerpack of the WDG-4, due to both reasons, spare parts unavailability and the high fuel consumption of the v20 engine. This is kind of similar how many of the SD45 and SD45-2 units got their v20-645 engines replaced by the v16-645 prime movers of the SD40s.

== Locomotive shed ==
Zone	Name	Shed Code	Quantity
Western Railway	Sabarmati	SBTD	7
Total Locomotives Active as of September 2026			5

Only 3 units 50001, 50005 and 50006 were active until July 2026, when 2 more units 50003 and 50007 were put back to service, but by replacing their v20 prime mover with the v16 of the WDG-4.

== See also ==
- EMD SD80MAC
- Indian locomotive class WDG-4
- Indian locomotive class WDG-6G
- List of diesel locomotives of India
- Indian Railways
- Rail transport in India
