= New Guwahati railway station =

Railway station in Assam

New Guwahati

General information
- Location: New Guwahati, Bamunimaidam, Guwahati, Assam; India
- Coordinates: 26°10′54″N 91°47′32″E
- Elevation: 60 metres (200 ft)
- System: Indian Railways station
- Owner: Indian Railways
- Platforms: 0
- Tracks: 4
- Connections: Auto stand

Construction
- Structure type: Standard (on-ground station)
- Parking: No
- Cycle facilities: No

Other information
- Status: Functioning
- Station code: NGC
- Zone(s): Northeast Frontier Railways
- Division(s): Lumding
Location
- Location within Guwahati Location within Assam

New Guwahati Railway Station is a railway station in Guwahati, Assam. Its code is NGC. It serves Guwahati City. The station has no platform. It's just a passing through station with no train stopping. It's Assam's first BG diesel locomotive shed. The area serves as a passenger and goods train yard.

== Diesel loco Shed, New Guwahati ==
SN	Locomotives	HP	Quantity
1.	WDM-3D	3300	15
2.	WDG-4/4D	4000/4500	37
3.	WDP-4/4B/4D	4000/4500	72
4.	WAP-7	6350	43
5.	WAG-9	6120	42
Total Locomotives Active as of February 2026			189
