= Ib Thermal Power Station =

Thermal power plant

Coordinates: 21.691365°N 83.862479°E

Ib Thermal Power Station (ITPS) is a coal-based thermal power plant located near Jharsuguda town in Jharsuguda district in the Indian state of Odisha. The power plant is operated by the state owned Orissa Power Generation Corporation.

The coal for the plant is sourced from Ib Valley Coalfield. Water is sourced from reservoir of Hirakud Dam.

== Capacity ==
Its installed capacity is of 1740 MW (2x210 + 2x660). The commissioning of two more units of capacity 1320 MW (2x660) at the same location was completed in August 2019 to the existing plant for which the Engineering, procurement and construction contract was given to BHEL and BGR Energy Systems Ltd.

The unit wise capacity and other details are as follows.

Stage	Unit Number	Installed Capacity (MW)	Date of Commissioning
1st	1	210	1994
1st	2	210	1996
2nd	3	660	02.07.2019
2nd	4	660	16.08.2019
Total	Four	1740	
