= Diesel Locomotive Factory, Marhowrah =

Locomotive manufacturing unit in India

- Built: Joint venture
- Operated: 2019
- Location: Marhowra, Saran district, Bihar India
- Industry: Railway
- Products: Diesel Locomotive
- Area: 226 acres (91 ha)
- Owners: Wabtec & Ministry of Railways

The Diesel Locomotive Factory, Marhowrah is a joint venture of GE Transportation, part of American company Wabtec, with Indian Railways for the production of 1000 high-power freight locomotives over a period of 10 years designed to run on Indian railway tracks. This factory is located at Marhaura (also spelt as Marhowrah) and started manufacturing the locomotives from September 2018.

The company is also setting-up two maintenance depots at Gandhidham in Gujarat and Roza in Uttar Pradesh.

== Overview ==
During September 2013, the Ministry of Railways received bids from six global firms: Siemens, Alstom, Bombardier, General Electric, CSR Corp and CNR Corp. However, Indian Railways rejected the bid of both Chinese firms (CSR and CNR) for the two giant manufacturing projects in Bihar.

In January 2014, the Union Cabinet gave its approval for setting up an Electric Locomotive Factory in Madhepura and a Diesel Locomotive Factory (DLF) in Marhowra at an approximate cost of ₹1,293.57 crore (US$140 million) and ₹2,052.58 crore (US$210 million) respectively.

On 9 November 2015, the Ministry of Railways awarded the contracts for Madhepura project and Marhaura project to Alstom and General Electric respectively in a collective amount of US $6 billion. This multi crore rupees deal was seen as the country's first FDI in the railway sector.

General Electric’s first diesel locomotive arrived in India on 11 October 2017 from the US.

== Location ==
The factory is located at Marhaura, a town and an administrative sub-divisional area in Saran district in the Indian state of Bihar. Marhaura is 81 km north of the state capital Patna. Chhapra Junction is the nearest major railway station approximately 18 km from this factory.

== Financial assets ==
As a joint venture company, both Indian Railways and GE Transportation are set to invest collectively a huge amount of US $2.5 billion for DLF. Indian Railways will hold 26% equity in the JV company subject to a maximum of ₹100 crore (US$10 million). The estimated cost of 1000 locomotives will be around ₹14,656 crore (US$1.5 billion). GE Transportation will maintain the locomotives for 13 years, after which the Indian Railways will take over maintenance.

== Products ==
There will be two types of diesel electric locos – 700 WDG 4G locos of 4,500 horsepower (HP) and 300 WDG 6G locos of 6,000 HP.

1. WDG 4G 4500 hp, Co-Co, Broad Gauge (1, 676 mm), Evolution Series freight locomotive, 3-phase technology and IGBT technology. The GE designation of the locomotive is ES43ACmi. Weight 137.89 Tons. Axle Loading 22.97 Tons per Axle. Starting Traction Effort 544 KN, Continuous Traction Effort 405 KN. Maximum Speed 100 kmph (62 mph). Engine GEVO-12, UIC 1 Emission Standard Compliant.
2. WDG 6G : 6000 hp, Co-Co, Broad Gauge (1, 676 mm), Evolution Series freight locomotive, 3-phase technology and IGBT technology. The GE designation of the locomotive is ES57ACi. Weight 144.64 Tons. Axle Loading 24.1 Tons per Axle. Starting Traction Effort 570 KN, Continuous Traction Effort 420 KN. Maximum Speed 100 kmph (62 mph). Engine GEVO-16, UIC 1 Emission Standard Compliant. This is the most powerful diesel loco of Indian railways

== See also ==
- Electric Locomotive Factory, Madhepura
- Rail transport in India
- Locomotives of India
