= Indian locomotive class WDG-4 =

Indian Railways freight class diesel locomotive

WDG-4
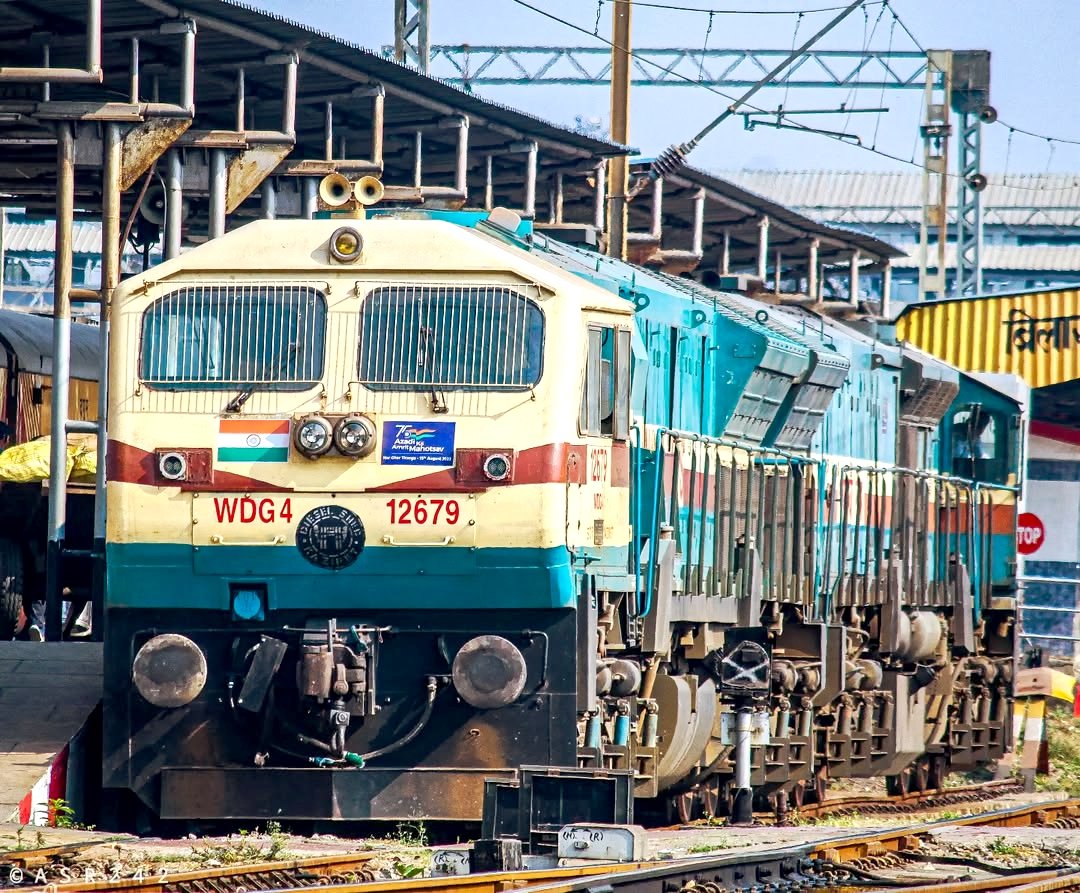
- Kazipet based WDG-4 twins (4500 HP GT46ACe variants) standing at Bilaspur Jn.
Type and origin
- Power type: Diesel–electric
- Builder: EMD; BLW
- Model: GT46MAC (1997–2007); GT46ACe (2007–2016); JT46ACe (2013–2018)
- Build date: (EMD) 1997–1998 (BLW) 2002–2018
- Total produced: WDG-4: 1188; WDG-4D: 583 (Mainline Production has stopped, but happens occasionally for Non-Railway Customers)
Specifications
- Configuration
  - UIC: Co′Co′
  - Commonwealth: Co-Co
- Gauge: 5 ft 6 in (1,676 mm)
- Trucks: HTSC
- Length: 21.26 m (69 ft 9 in)
- Height: 4.11 m (13 ft 6 in)
- Axle load: 21,000 kg (46,000 lb)
- Loco weight: 126,000 kg (278,000 lb) or 126 t (124 long tons; 139 short tons)
- Fuel type: Diesel fuel
- Fuel capacity: 6,100 Litres
- Prime mover: EMD 16-710G3B
- Engine type: two-stroke V16 diesel
- Aspiration: turbocharged
- Displacement: 186.2 liters (11,360 cubic inches)
- Alternator: TA-17-CA6A AC
- Traction motors: 1 inverter per truck, AC traction motors
- Cylinders: 16
- Transmission: diesel–electric
- Loco brake: Air
- Train brakes: Graduated Release Twin Pipe Air Brake, Dynamic Brakes, Blended
Performance figures
- Maximum speed: 105 km/h (65 mph)
- Power output: 4,000 hp (2,980 kW) / 4,500 hp (3,360 kW)
- Tractive effort: 540 kN (120,000 lbf)
Career
- Operators: Indian Railways, Sri Lanka Railways [as locomotive class M-11, Down-tweaked to 3,250 HP (2.4 MW) using a v12-710 prime mover]
- Numbers: WDG-4: 12001–12999 & 70001–70190; WDG-4D: 12681 & 70301–70882

The Indian locomotive class WDG-4 (EMD GT46MAC) is a type of six-axle (Co-Co) freight-hauling diesel–electric locomotive with AC electric transmission designed by General Motors Electro-Motive Diesel in 1997–1998 for Indian Railways, where they are classed as WDG-4. Derived from the EMD SD70MAC, it is powered by a 4,000 hp (3,000 kW) 16-cylinder EMD 710G3B prime mover. Thirteen were built by EMD as order #958647, and a further eight were exported in kit form and assembled in India. The class entered service in 1999. A Dedicated Passenger version of this locomotive, the WDP-4 (EMD GT46PAC), has also been produced, with a Bo1-1Bo Wheel Configuration, which entered service in 2001. These locomotives are also famous for, and can be identified by, the distinct Jet Turbine Engine–like sounding property of the EMD 710 prime mover.

Further construction has been under license in India by the Banaras Locomotive Works (BLW), with the first purely indigenously built WDG-4 locomotive, numbered 12022, that rolled out in 2002. More than 60 additional locomotives have been built as of 2006. They are numbered from #12001 upward.

As of August 2007, EMD and DLW have begun building GT46ACe's using IGBT technology to replace the older gate turn-off thyristor technology and along with increase of 500 hp, ie, 4,500 hp (3.4 MW), using the Newly tweaked EMD 16N-710G3B-EC, like the passenger WDP-4B have been produced. Newer versions with widened Piggy-face cab profile for enhanced visibility, just like the later variants of WDP-4's and WDP-4B's were also produced.

As of February 2013, DLW began building the Dual Cab version, EMD JT46ACe, called WDG-4D, based on the passenger variant WDP-4D locos, same for both-side visibility. Here again, many features, including IGBT and 4,500 hp have been carried on from the single cab GT46ACe's. The first WDG-4D, numbered 12681, is named "Vijay". Later WDG-4D's were numbered from 70301, as the 12*** series came to an end in 2014 and got switched to 70*** series. Over 1,500 such locomotives, including both WDG-4's and WDG-4D's are currently in operation.

Indian Railways has also developed the WDG-4 series into EMD GT50AC (aka WDG-5), using a v20-710G prime mover, based on the SD80MAC, rated at 5,500 HP (4,130 kW). However, this locomotive has turned out to be a Failure, due to various reasons.

Since the year 2017, BLW (DLW then) began manufacturing such locomotives for Non-Railway Customers. The first such locomotive, which would be a Dual-Cab WDG-4D, rolled out to serve Odisha Power Generation Corporation (OPGC), in March 2017. Three WDG-4D locomotives currently serve OPGC. As of 2024, two new Single-Cab Piggy-face WDG-4 locomotives have been manufactured and rolled out for Obra Thermal Power Station, based at Sonbhadra, Uttar Pradesh. A Third one for Obra was rolled out recently in 2026.

== Locomotive sheds ==
Zone	Name	Shed Code	Quantity
Zone	Name	Shed Code	WDG-4/4D
Central Railway	Pune	PADX	83
Central Railway	Kalyan	KYDX	66
Eastern Railway	Andal	UDLD	147
East Central Railway	Patratu	PTRX	79
Northern Railway	Ludhiana	LDHD	26
Northern Railway	Lucknow	AMVD	58
Northern Railway	Tughlakabad	TKDD	49
North Eastern Railway	Izzatnagar	IZND	14
North Central Railway	Jhansi	JHSD	70
Northeast Frontier Railway	New Guwahati	NGCD	37
Northeast Frontier Railway	Siliguri	SGUD	156
North Western Railway	Bhagat Ki Kothi	BGKD	29
North Western Railway	Abu Road	ABRD	124
Southern Railway	Ponmalai Goldenrock	GOCD	75
Southern Railway	Ernakulam	ERSX	24
Southern Railway	Tondiarpet	TNPD	14
South Central Railway	Kazipet	KZJD	75
South Coast Railway	Gooty	GYD	3
South Coast Railway	Vijayawada	BZAD	34
South Coast Railway	Visakhapatnam	WATD	122
South Eastern Railway	Bondamunda	BNDX	129
South East Central Railway	Raipur	RPDX	75
South Western Railway	Krishnarajapuram	KJMD	26
South Western Railway	SSS Hubballi	UBLD	146
Western Railway	Sabarmati	SBTD	35
West Central Railway	Itarsi	ETD	58
Total Locomotives Active as of November 2026			1754

== Non-Railway Operators ==
Name of the Operator	Quantity
Name of the Operator	WDG-4/4D
Odisha Power Generation Corporation	3
Obra Thermal Power Station	3

== See also ==
- Indian locomotive class WDP-4
- List of diesel locomotives of India
- Indian Railways
- Rail transport in India
