= Odisha Coal and Power Limited =

Indian coal mining company

Odisha Coal and Power Ltd
- Company type: State-owned enterprise Public company
- Industry: Coal Mining
- Founded: 20-January-2015
- Headquarters: Bhubaneswar, Odisha, India
- Key people: Nikunja Bihari Dhal (Chairman); Sariputta Mishra (CEO)
- Products: Non-coaking coal
- Services: Coal mine development and coal production
- Revenue: ▲₹5,323.115 million (US$56 million) (2021-22)
- Website: www.ocpl.org.in

Odisha Coal and Power Limited (OCPL) is a coal mining company owned by Government of Odisha. It was incorporated under the Companies Act 2013 on 20 January 2016. It has been allocated with two coal blocks in the state of Odisha by the Ministry of Coal, Government of India namely Manoharpur and Dipside of Manoharpur coal blocks in Sundergarh District of Odisha.

OCPL was started as a Joint venture company of Odisha Power Generation Corporation Limited and Odisha Hydro Power Corporation Limited, with 51% and 49% partnership respectively.

However, in February, 2023 the shares of OHPC was taken over by Government of Odisha.

The shareholding pattern of OCPL is as follows

Shareholders	Percentage
OPGC	51
Government of Odisha	49

== Project ==
The OCPL has been allotted two coal blocks namely Manoharpur and Dipside of Manoharpur coal mines. The Manoharpur coal mine operation has commenced and the coal production from this mine started in October-2019. OCPL has engaged M/s BGR Mining Ltd. as the Mine Operator for the Manoharpur coal mine project. OCPL has constructed a Coal Handling Plant (CHP) of 4,000 TPH capacity at the pit head of the Manoharpur coal mine for ease in transportation of coal.
