= Odisha Power Generation Corporation =

Thermal power generating company owned by the Government of Odisha

Odisha Power Generation Corporation Limited
- Type: State-owned enterprise Public company
- Industry: Electric utility
- Founded: 1984
- Headquarters: Bhubaneswar, Odisha, India
- Key people: Shri Vishal Kumar Dev, IAS (Chairman); Shri Kedara Ranjan Pandu (Managing Director)
- Products: Electric power
- Services: Electricity generation
- Revenue: ▲₹28,667.93 million (US$300 million) (2021-22)
- Number of employees: 900 (2012)
- Website: www.opgc.co.in

Odisha Power Generation Corporation Limited (OPGC) is the only thermal power generating company owned by the Government of Odisha. It was incorporated under the Companies Act, 1956 on 14 November 1984. OPGC started as a solely owned Government Company of the state of Odisha. It owns and operates four units of power plant- 2 units of 210 MW each and 2 units of 660 MW, each totaling a generation capacity of 1740 MW of power at Ib Thermal Power Station (ITPS), Banharpali in Jharsuguda District of Odisha. The generation from these units is committed to GRIDCO based on a long-term Power Purchase Agreement.

With the divestment of 49% of the equity shares in favor of AES Corporation, in early 1999, the ownership structure of OPGC became the first of its kind in the country. Following the withdrawal of AES from OPGC in December 2020, Govt. of Odisha bought back the 49% equity held by AES. Thus, OPGC became a fully owned company of the Govt. of Odisha once again.

In 1990, OPGC started the construction of 7 Mini Hydel Projects in different locations of Odisha for the generation of pollution-free power by utilizing canal falls to meet the increasing demand for power with major funding from MNES and IREDA. The details are as follows:

Project name	Capacity (KW)	Status as of 2009
Biribati MHP	2 X 325	Under Operation
Kendupatna MHP	2 X 250	Under Operation
Andharibhangi MHP	1 X 325	Under Operation
Badanala MHP	2 X 325	Revival Proposal in Phase II
Banpur MHP	2 X 150	Revival Proposal in Phase II
Harabhangi MHP	2 X 1000	Revival Proposal in Phase III
Barboria MHP	2 X 325	Revival Proposal in Phase III

== Operational highlights ==
Year	Unit 1&2 Generation (MU)	Unit 1&2 PLF (%)	Unit 1&2 Aux. Consumption (%)	Unit 3&4 Generation (MU)	Unit 3&4 PLF (%)	Unit 3&4 Aux. Consumption (%)
2021-22	2955.80	80.40	11.26	7236.55	62.58	6.41
2022-23	2782.51	75.63	11.60	8930.91	77.24	5.64
2023-24	2506.48	67.94	11.80	9293.18	80.15	5.58

== OPGC Expansion Project ==
On 1 March 2019 Chief Minister Naveen Patnaik inaugurated OPGC's expansion project, which consists of two units of 660 MW each (total 1320 MW), and coal mines operated by Odisha Coal and Power Ltd. (OCPL), dedicated to the coal requirement of the two new units. The contract was awarded to M/s Bharat Heavy Electricals Limited (BHEL) for the supply of Main Plant, and to M/s BGRE for balance of plant.

75% of power to be generated from the capacity addition has been tied up with GRIDCO under a long term power purchase agreement. Financing agreement executed with Power Finance Corporation and Rural Electrification Corporation for the financing of 75% debt. Two captive coal mines (namely Manoharpur and Dip-side of Manoharpur) allocated to Odisha Coal and Power Limited for the supply of coal to OPGC are in an advanced stage of development, along with the dedicated railway line (MGR) of 47 km for transporting the coal from the mine to the power plant. The land acquisition process for railway line and coal mine have been significantly advanced and the Stage-1 clearance has been obtained from the Ministry of Environment and Forest, Government of India for Forest Diversion for coal mine and MGR alignment.

The power plant will depend on coal from the captive coal mine allocated to Odisha Coal and Power Limited. The Coal from the coal mines of Odisha Coal and Power Limited shall be transported through the dedicated railway line to OPGC for commissioning and operation of the expansion power project thereafter.

In addition to Units 3&4, based on the coal reserves available from the captive mines, OPGC has started planning for construction of Units 5&6 of 2x660 MW (1320 MW) at the same location.
