= GE Evolution Series =

Series of diesel locomotive models

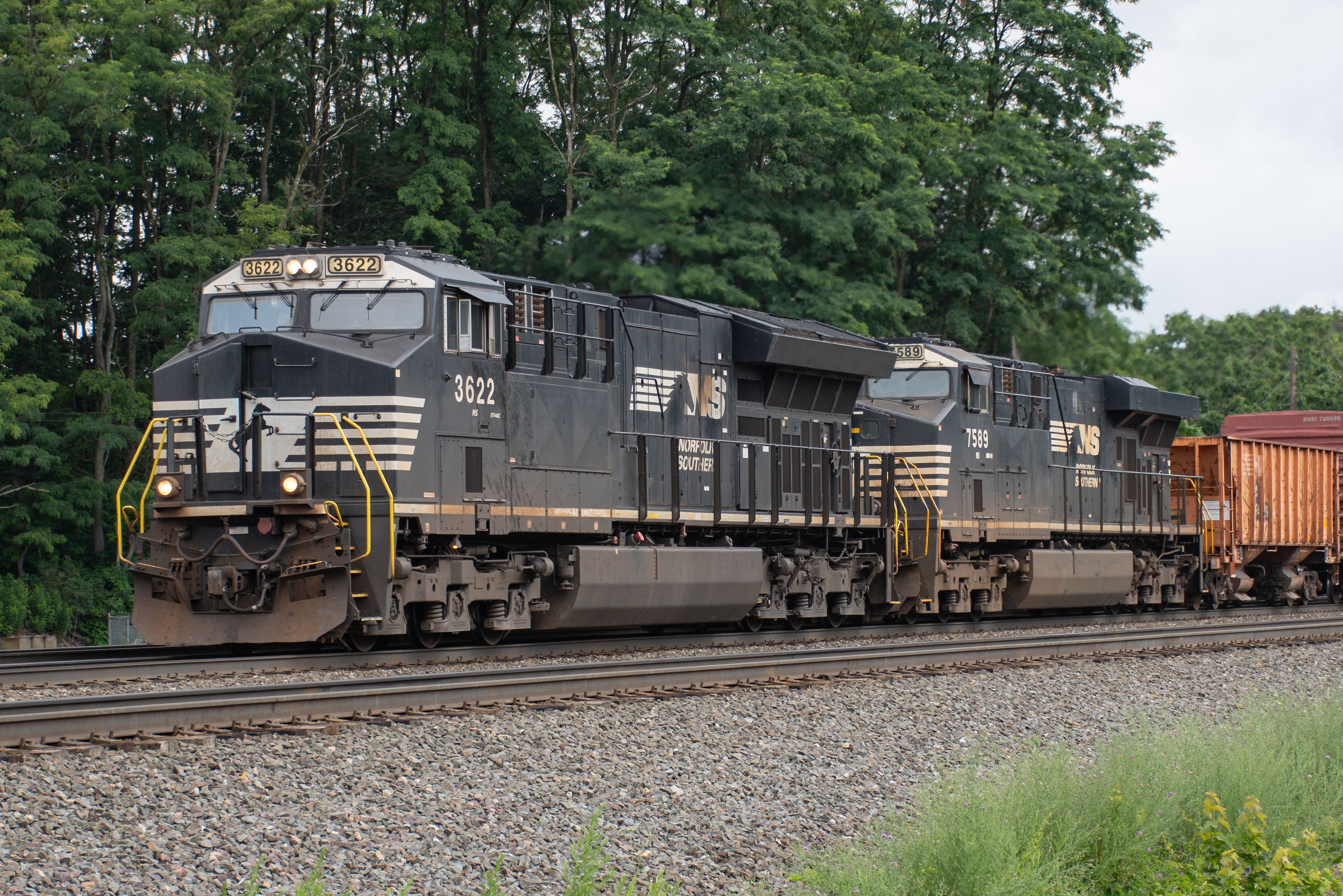
- A Norfolk Southern ET44AC No. 3622 with an ES44DC No. 7589. The different sized radiators help distinguish the models.
Type and origin
- Power type: Diesel-electric
- Builder: General Electric Transportation
- Build date: 2003 – present
Specifications
- Configuration
  - AAR: C-C (ES40DC, ES44DC, ES44AC, ES58ACi, ES59ACi); A1A-A1A (ES44C4)
  - UIC: Co′Co′ (ES30ACi, ES40ACi, ES40DC, ES44DC, ES44AC, ES44DCi, ES44ACi, ES58ACi, ES59ACi, ET44AC), (A1A)(A1A) (ES44C4, ET44C4)
  - Commonwealth: Co-Co (ES30ACi, ES40ACi, ES40DC, ES43ACi, ES43ACmi, ES44DC, ES44AC, ES44DCi, ES44ACi, ES57ACi, ES58ACi, ES59ACi, ET44AC), A1A-A1A (ES44C4, ET44C4)
- Gauge: 1,000 mm (3 ft 3 3/8 in); 1,067 mm (3 ft 6 in); 4 ft 8 1/2 in (1,435 mm) standard gauge 1,520 mm (4 ft 11 27/32 in) Kazakhstan; 5 ft 3 in (1,600 mm) Brazil; 5 ft 6 in (1,676 mm) India
- Length: 73 ft 2 in (22.30 m) (ES44AC/DC/C4) 74 ft 6 in (22.71 m) (ET44AC/AH/C4)
- Fuel capacity: 5,000 US gal (19,000 L; 4,200 imp gal) (ES40DC, ES44DC, ES44AC, ES44C4)
- Prime mover: GEVO
- Engine type: V12 (ES30ACi, ES40ACi, ES40DC, ES44DC, ES44AC, ES44C4); V16 (ES58ACi, ES59ACi); 4-stroke diesel engine
- Cylinders: 12 (ES30ACi, ES40ACi, ES40DC, ES44DC, ES44AC, ES44C4); 16 (ES58ACi, ES59ACi)
Performance figures
- Maximum speed: Design: 70 mph (113 km/h), 75 mph (121 km/h) for C4 Models
- Power output: 3,300 hp (2.5 MW) (ES30ACi); 4,000 hp (3.0 MW) (ES40DC); 4,250 hp (3.2 MW)(ES40ACi, ES30ACi w Turbocharger); 4,400 hp (3.3 MW) (ES44DC, ES44AC, ES44C4, ET44AC, ET44AH, ET44C4); 6,200 hp (4.6 MW) (ES58ACi, ES59ACi)
- Tractive effort
  - Starting: 183,000 lbf (810 kN) (ES44AC); 200,000 lbf (890 kN) (ET44AC); 144,000 lbf (640 kN) (ES44C4, ET44C4)
  - Continuous: 166,000 lbf (740 kN) (ES44AC, ET44AC); 105,000 lbf (470 kN) (ES44C4, ET44C4)
Career
- Operators: UP, BNSF, CSX, NS, CN, CPKC, GECX, FXE, IAIS, SVTX, CREX, FEC, RZD, TMY
- Nicknames: GEVO
- Disposition: Most are still in service as of 2026 (The only ones retired have been involved in wrecks)

The Evolution Series is a line of diesel locomotives built by GE Transportation Systems (now owned by Wabtec), initially designed to meet the U.S. EPA's Tier 2 locomotive emissions standards that took effect in 2005. The line is the direct successor to the GE Dash 9 Series. The first pre-production units were built in 2003. Evolution Series locomotives are equipped with either AC or DC traction motors, depending on the customer's preference. All are powered by the GE GEVO engine.

The Evolution Series was named as one of the "10 Locomotives That Changed Railroading" by Trains Magazine and was the only locomotive series introduced after 1972 to be included in that list. The Evolution Series locomotives are some of the best-selling and most successful freight locomotives in United States history.

== Models ==
Six different Evolution Series models (seven including rebuilds) have been produced for the North American market. They are all six-axle locomotives and have AAR wheel arrangement C-C (UIC classification Co′Co′), except for the ES44C4 and ET44C4 which uses the AAR A1A-A1A wheel arrangement and the meter-gauge version developed for the Brazilian network ES43BBi which is AAR B-B-B-B.

=== ES40DC (2004–2008) ===
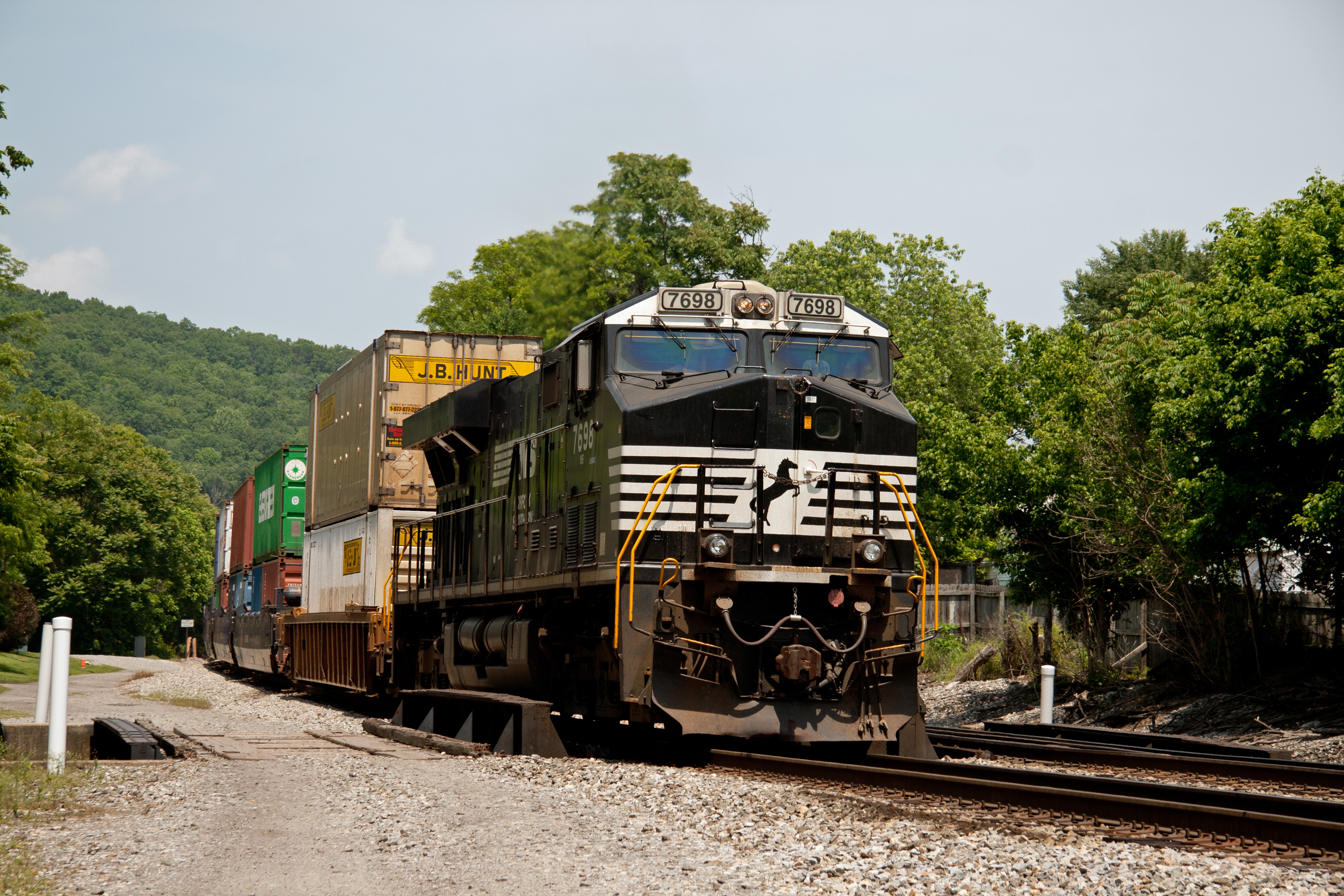
NS ES40DC No. 7698

The ES40DC (Evolution Series, 4,000 hp, DC traction) replaced the Dash 9-40CW model in the General Electric catalogue and, like the former model, was delivered exclusively to Norfolk Southern Railway. ES44DCs owned by CSX Transportation were also given this designation in 2009 after being de-rated to 4,000 hp (3,000 kW). However, high-horsepower demand on Norfolk Southern made a mandatory repowering of several ES40DC engines into their former ES44DC power.

=== ES44DC (2005–2010) ===
The ES44DC (Evolution Series, 4,400 hp, DC traction) replaced the Dash 9-44CW model in the General Electric catalogue. Primary users are BNSF Railway, CSX Transportation, and Canadian National Railway. Pilbara Iron in Australia ordered a lengthened, international version designated ES44DCi. The extra length is used for a larger radiator to increase cooling capacity in the Australian outback.

=== ES44AC (2003–present) ===
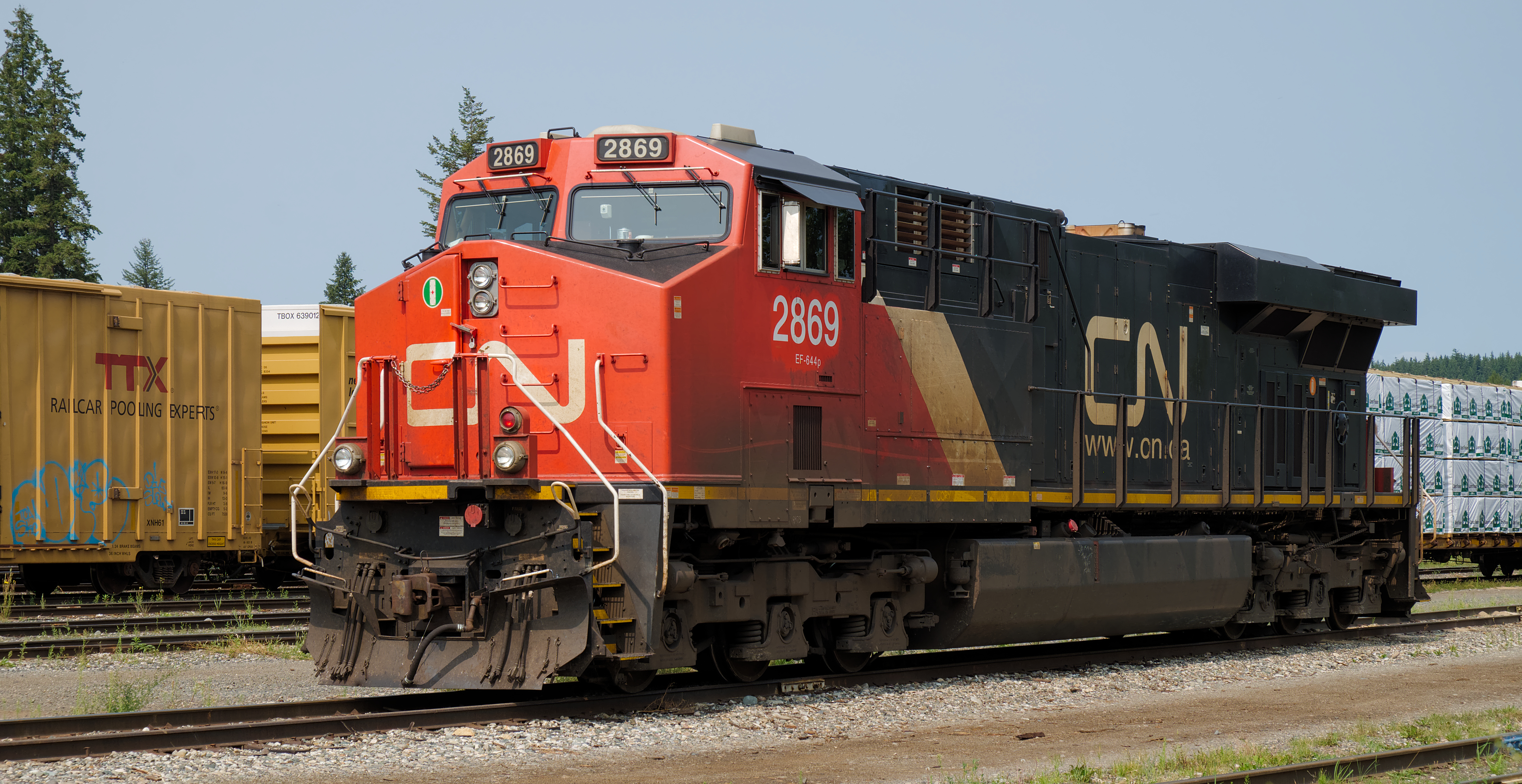
CN ES44AC No. 2869

The ES44AC (Evolution Series, 4,400 hp, AC traction) replaced the AC4400CW model in the General Electric catalogue. These locomotives have been ordered by every Class I freight railroad in North America, as well as some exports: Union Pacific, BNSF Railway, CSX Transportation, Canadian Pacific, Kansas City Southern, and Ferromex were among the many companies to purchase the model, while later companies like Norfolk Southern, Canadian National, Iowa Interstate, Cemex (despite only receiving one unit), Cerrejón (coal field in Colombia), Cartier Railway, and CREX (Citicorp/Citirail leasing) have since ordered units.

Union Pacific also bought the heavy ballasted variation of this model, the ES44AH, and refers to it as the C45AH. UP also uses this designation to refer to their ET44AH units.

CSX Transportation has bought these locomotives and they were always heavy ballasted, so they called these the ES44AH. The first set was 700–999, which was built from 2007–2011. Beginning 2023, CSX has repainted and renumbered the 3000 series locomotives to heritage units. The first heritage, 1827, was painted into Baltimore & Ohio and renumbered from 3059 on May 11, 2023.

BNSF Railway purchased 25 ES44AC locomotives in 2023, and they are all classified as ES44ACH. They were built between August and September 2023 and were built concurrently with the ET44ACH. The numbers were 3282–3306, which officially ended the production of the ES44C4 in 2020. These units are Tier 4 credit units. In 2024, BNSF has bought 25 more ES44ACH locomotives, which are numbered from 3307–3331. These locomotives weigh 436,320 lbs.

=== ES44C4 (2009–2020) ===
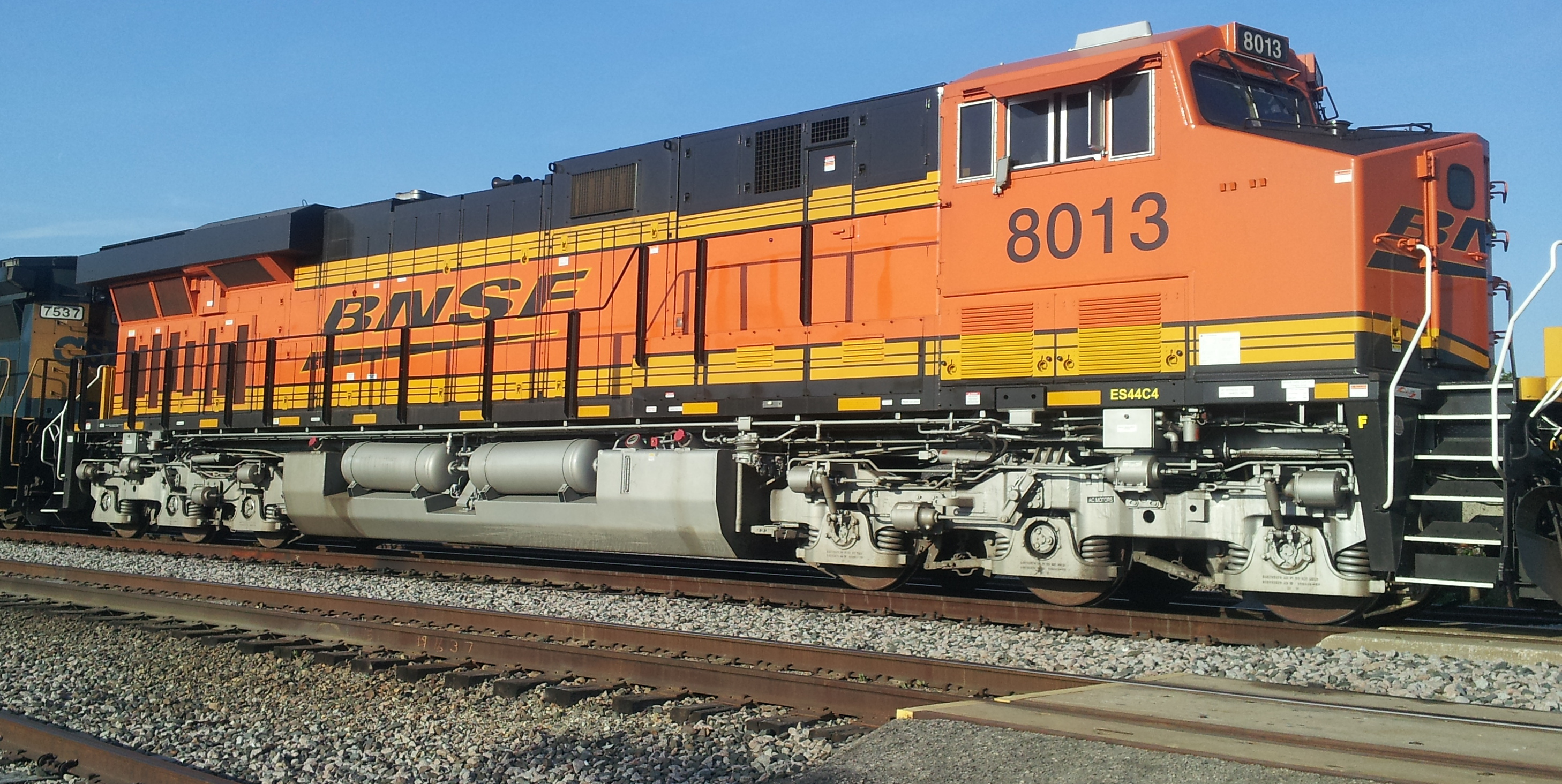
BNSF ES44C4 No. 8013

The ES44C4 (Evolution Series, 4,400 hp, C to denote 3 axles per truck, 4 traction motors) was introduced in 2009. While similar to the ES44AC, the ES44C4 has two traction motors per truck, instead of the conventional three such as on the ES44AC. No ES44C4s with DC traction were built. The center axle of each truck is unpowered, giving an A1A-A1A wheel arrangement. BNSF Railway is the launch customer for this model, ordering an initial batch of 25 units numbered 6600–6624. The ES44C4 was initially only built for BNSF. The units 3250–3281, the 4200s, 5533–5546, 7921–7999, and units 8318–8399 are certified as Tier 4 Credit units, while the others are Tier 2 or Tier 3. On 30 January 2014 Florida East Coast Railway announced that they would buy 24 ES44C4s, to be numbered 800–823, for heavy haul service and intermodal traffic. All were delivered by the end of 2014, in order to beat the EPA's deadline on exhaust-emissions standards for new-built Tier 3 locomotives.

A feature of these units is a variable traction control system in their computer systems. One of the differences between an ES44AC and an ES44C4 is the air cylinders and linkages on the truck sideframes of the ES44C4; these are part of the traction control system. Every time a variation in grade, traction, or wheel slip occurs, the computer adjusts the pressure in these cylinders to maintain sufficient adhesion, by varying the weight on the drive axles.

=== ES44DCi/ES44ACi ===
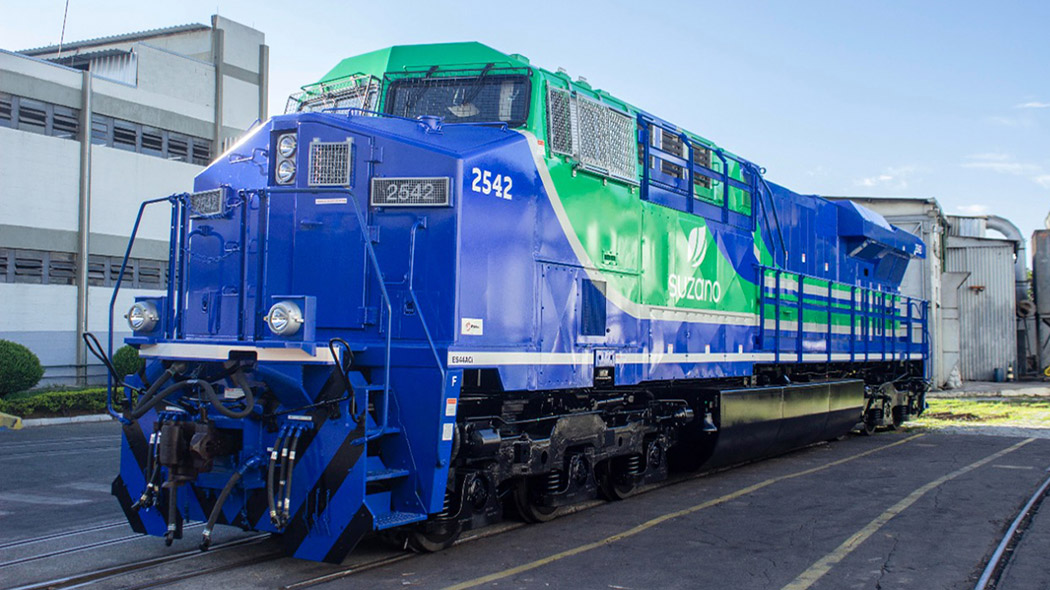
Wabtec ES44ACi No. 2542

The ES44DCi (Evolution Series, 4400 horsepower, DC traction, international version) was built for the Rio Tinto railway in the Pilbara region of Australia. The ES44ACi was built for Rio Tinto and Roy Hill.

The ES44ACi/DCi is essentially an ES44AC/DC in a GE AC6000CW's body, with the radiator at the end protruding out over the rear deck in the same way the AC6000CW does. The locomotive's large radiator allows it to handle the Australian outback's extreme temperatures.

Roy Hill ordered 21 ES44ACi locomotives, and is in possession of all 21 locomotives (numbered 1001 "Ginny"-1021). Rio Tinto ordered 100 ES44DCi locomotives and has all 100 (numbered 8100–8199) and 21 ES44ACi locomotives (numbered 9100–9120) and more are on order. Rio Tinto's units can be remotely driven, meaning nobody has to be in the cab as they can be controlled from a control center.

Ferromex also acquired 50 ES44ACi. As the construction of these locomotives was subsequent to the new environmental laws of the US, GE cataloged them only as ES44ACi, although in the external technical specifications of the locomotives say ES44AC). These locomotives can no longer reenter the US operating.

In Brazil, the Rumo, Suzano and MRS Logística railways purchased 25 units, manufactured at Wabtec of Brazil with broad-gauge trucks.

=== ET44AC (2012–present) ===
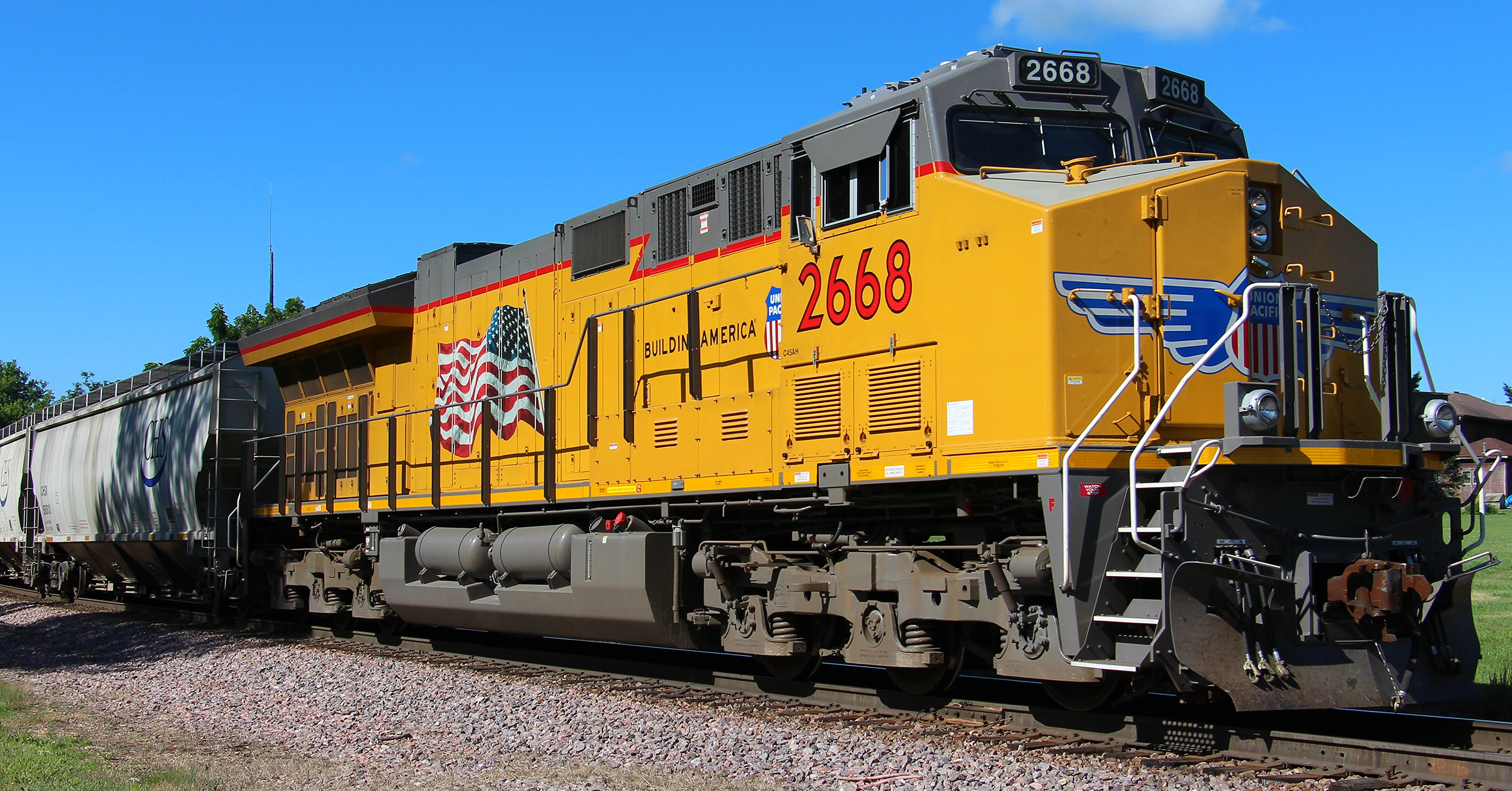
Union Pacific ET44AC (C45AH) No. 2668

The ET44AC (Evolution Series Tier 4, 4400 hp, AC traction) replaces the ES44AC model. Earlier, every single class 1 freight railroad owned the ET44AC, with the exceptions of BNSF Railway and Canadian Pacific. (However, BNSF Railway did order ET44ACHs in late 2023, while Canadian Pacific ordered ET44ACs only in late 2024 after the CPKC merger in April 2023.) UP and CSX designate their ET44ACs as ET44AH although UP calls these C45AH, and BNSF calling them ET44ACH as their locomotives are ballasted to 436,320 lbs.

=== ET44C4 (2015–2020) ===
The ET44C4 (Evolution Series, Tier 4, 4400 hp, C = 3 axles per truck, 4 traction motors) is a 4 traction motor version of the ET44AC, meaning they have a dynamic weight management system instead of a traction motor on the middle axle of each truck. It is the successor of the ES44C4. BNSF Railway is the only owner of this model, owning 325 units from 3675 to 3999.

=== ET23DCM (2023–present) ===
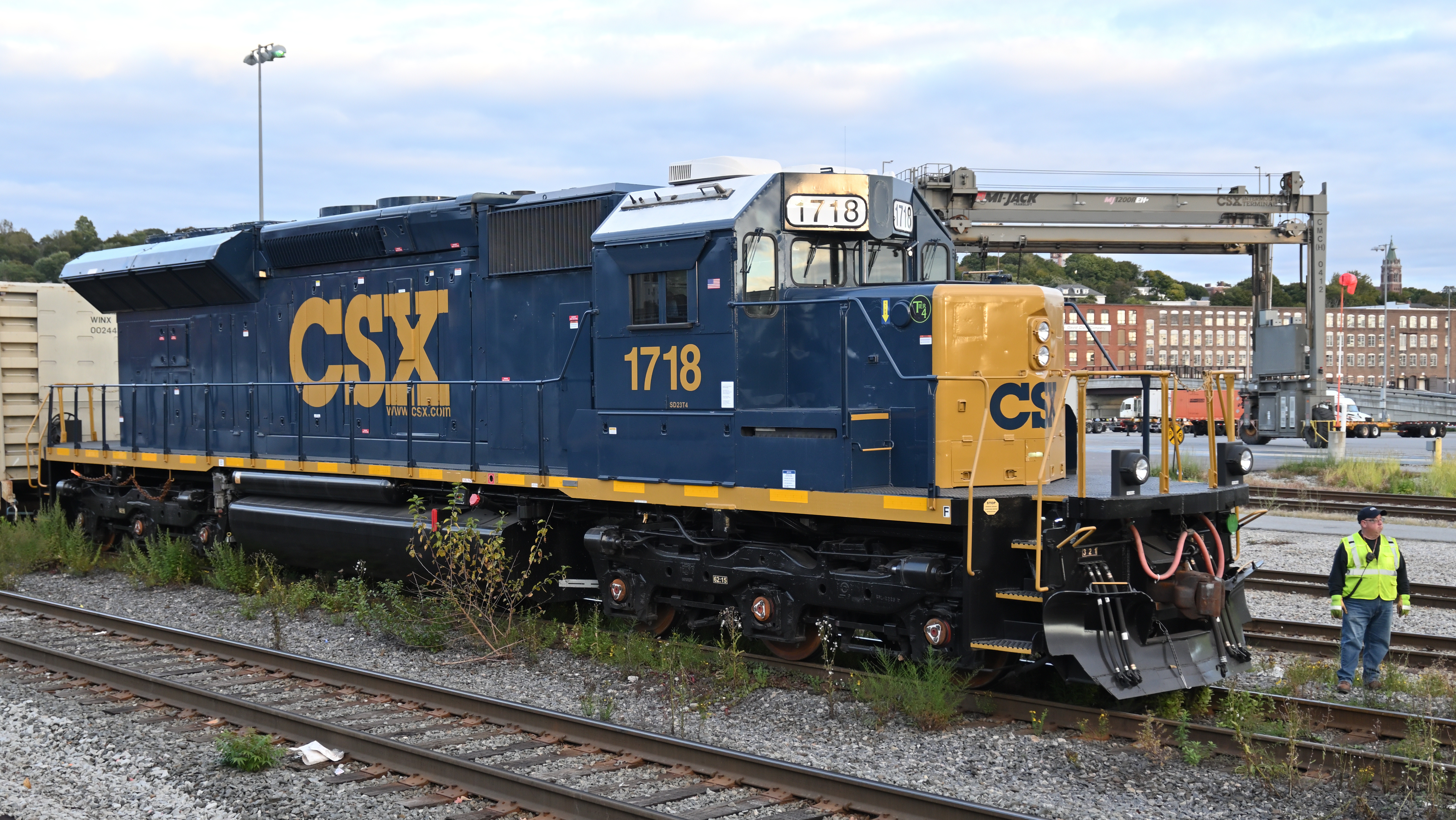
CSX ET23DCM No. 1718

The ET23DCM (Evolution Series Tier 4, 2350 hp, DC traction), sometimes called the SD23T4, is a modernized locomotive using EMD's SD40-2 platform and the Wabtec Inline 6-cylinder Tier 4 diesel engine. CSX Transportation ordered 15 of these locomotives, with most being built at their Huntington Heavy Repair Shop. Wabtec also built one locomotive as a demonstrator from ex-NS SD40-2 3259.

=== TE33A ===
The TE33A is an export 1520 mm (4 ft 112/32 in) gauge locomotive in the GE Evolution Series.

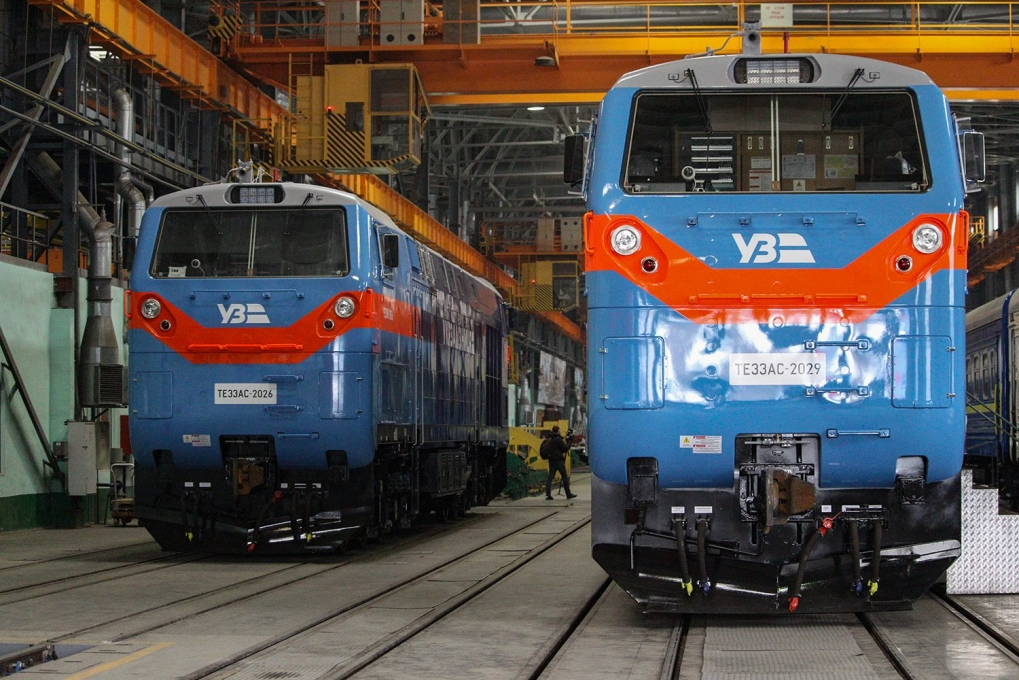
TE33A in Ukraine

=== 3TE25K2M ===
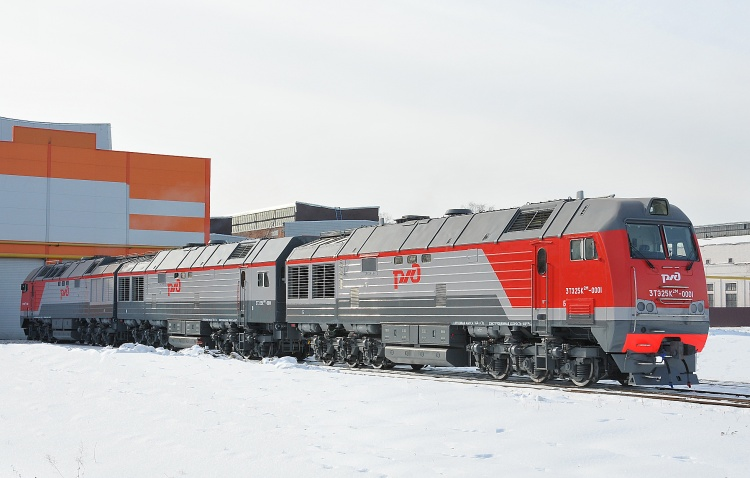
3TE25K2M No. 0001

The 3TE25K2M is an export 1520mm (4 ft 112/32 in) gauge locomotive in the GE Evolution Series for Russian Railways. These locomotives are built by Transmashholding-Bryansk Machine Building.

=== ES40ACi (2008–2010) ===
The ES40ACi (Evolution Series, 4,250 hp, AC traction) was the first GEVO locomotive that was made for the Egyptian National Railways featuring a full-width car body and double cabin. The locomotive weighs 140 metric tons (312,000 lbs) and reaches maximum speed of 121 km/h (75 mph). 80 units were produced, and are used in both passenger and freight trains.

=== ES30ACi (2018–2022) ===
The ES30ACi (Evolution Series, 3300–4250 hp, AC Traction), was built for a total of 100 units. The locomotive weighs 135 metric tons (301,000 lbs) and the maximum speed is 121 km/h (75 mph). If Computer Controlled, it extends to 140 km/h (86 mph).

=== ES44ACM (2026–present) ===
The ES44ACM is a modernized ES44DC that is rebuilt with AC traction and upgraded control systems. On August 26th, 2026, Wabtec announced that they will convert 33 Norfolk Southern ES44DC locomotives into ES44ACMs as an expansion of an existing DC-to-AC modernization program for AC44C6M locomotives. The first locomotive was delivered in August 2026 and the remainder will be finished through 2027.

== Identifying features ==
The Evolution Series locomotives are visually similar to the AC4400CW and GE Dash 9 Series, although small differences are evident. The most noticeable difference is the radiator section at the rear of the locomotive is larger to accommodate the GEVO's air-to-air intercoolers. As with the AC6000CW, the radiators project beyond the end of the hood. On the ES44ACi and ES44DCi models, the radiator extends in the same way as the AC6000CW, protruding out over the rear deck. For the other Evolution Series locomotives, the radiator does not protrude completely over the rear deck, but rather sits nearly flush with the rear of the engine hood. Unlike previous GE locomotives, the grills under the radiator are at two different angles. The increase in radiator size is due to the necessity for greater cooling capacity in the locomotive in order to reduce emissions. The other major difference between the Evolution Series and earlier models is the vents below the radiators, which are larger than those on previous GE locomotives. Also, all Evolution Series units have air conditioners mounted below the cab on the conductor's side.

== Operators ==
Image	Railroad	Qty.	Road Numbers	Notes
ES40DC
	CSX Transportation	302	5200–5501	Built as ES44DC units but were downgraded by 2010. 5306, 5359, 5411, and 5488 were wrecked and retired. CSXT 5500 lettered "Spirit of Cincinnati".
ES44DC
	BNSF	721	7200–7920	Built between 2005 and 2010. 7650–7743 are painted in Heritage II (H2), except for 7687 and 7701 that are in Heritage III (H3). Few of these are getting repainted into H3. The rest of the ES44DC's are in H3. 7695 is painted in the Golden Swoosh scheme using H3. 7514, 7553, 7673, 7838, and 7847 were wrecked and retired. 7814 and 7907 were repaired after their respective train collisions.
	Canadian National	125	2220–2344	2328 was wrecked and retired.
	GE Transportation (Note: These locomotives are most often used in GE Transportation/Wabtec's small test fleet on a nearly 3-mile-long (4.8 km) test track in Erie, PA, to test new locomotives before delivery.)	N/A	1	2011
	Norfolk Southern	219	7500–7719	Unit 7530 wrecked and was retired. Units were uprated from 4,000 to 4,400 HP in 2014. 7500–7514 are preproduction units, renumbered from 9912–9926 due to the C40-9W units. 7500, 7504–7506, 7508, 7509, 7512, and 7514 were rebuilt to ES44ACMs in 2026.
ES44AC
	ArcelorMittal, operated by Cartier Railway	4	301–302, 1504-1505	Built 2010, operated by Cartier Railway. Units 1504 and 1505 are ex-CREX and are based in Liberia.
	BNSF	815	5718–5747	Built between October 2003 and April 2004, these are pre-production units. They are classified AC4400EV.
	BNSF	815	5748–5837	Built 2005.
	BNSF	815	5844–6438	Built between 2005 and 2009, BNSF 5942 was wrecked at Cactus, Texas in October 2006, but was rebuilt in 2009. 5958 was wrecked and retired in December 2013 while 6348 was wrecked and retired in 2019. 5774 was wrecked in Garza County, TX in October 2023 and retired. 5828, 5869, 5872, 6017, 6022, 6075, 6078, 6111, 6163, and 6179 were painted into BNSF's 25th anniversary stickers scheme in 2020 that celebrates 25 years of BNSF Railway as it started in 1995 from two railroads, BN and ATSF. 6026 was given a Northern Pacific sticker on the side of its nose.
	BNSF	815	3282–3381	Tier 4 credit units. Ballasted to 436,320 lb, and classified ES44ACH.
	Canadian National	435	1776, 2026, 2750–2760, 2762–2796, 2800–2999, 3800–3976, 3978–3987	2800–2975 were built 2012 through 2015. The first 2015 order (2951–2975) was built to Tier 3 standards but after the Tier 4 cutoff date and therefore are restricted to operation in Canada only. More Tier 4-compliant ET44AC's were on order for 2015 delivery, with the first two, CN 3002 and 3004, entering service on 6 August 2015. 8 additional Tier 4 units (2976–2983) were built in 2016–2017. 2984–2999 and 3800–3805 built in late 2017. 3806–3835 built in 2018 and 3836–3875 built in 2018–2019. 2750–2796 and 3913–3987 are ex-CREX units. 2792–2796, 2951–2999, 3800–3912, and 3970–3987 are Tier 4 Credit units. Units 3977 and 2761 were renumbered to 1776 and 2026 respectively in 2026.
	Canadian Pacific Kansas City	561	CP 8700–8960, 9350–9379; KCS 4650–4919	4700 was wrecked and retired. 4805 and 9375 are the first to be painted in the new CPKC corporate paint scheme.
	Cerrejón	4	10015–10018	
	Citicorp Railmark Inc. (Citirail) CREX (Note: Sold to Canadian National as of 2021. "Canadian National". The Diesel Shop.)	15	1201–1215	Delivered in December 2012. Sold to Canadian National
	Citicorp Railmark Inc. (Citirail) CREX	50	1301–1350	Delivered in late 2013. Sold to Canadian National. 1331 was wrecked and retired.
	Citicorp Railmark Inc. (Citirail) CREX	35	1401–1435	Delivered during summer 2014. Sold to Canadian National
	Citicorp Railmark Inc. (Citirail) CREX	25	1501—1525	Delivered in December 2015, units are Tier 4 Credit units. Most sold to Canadian National; while units 1504 and 1505 were sold to ArcelorMittal and exported to Liberia.
	Cemex	1	81	Built in March 2008 as an add-on to a CSXT order.
	CSX Transportation	550	700–999, 1776, 1827, 1834, 1836, 1850-1853, 1869, 1871, 1875, 1877, 1897, 1899, 1900, 1902, 1967, 1972, 1973, 1976, 1981, 1982, 3000–3048, 3070–3111, 3113–3249	These are the ES44AH model equipped with high tractive effort. These were built between 2007 and 2015. 847, 963, 3070, and 3097 have been wrecked and retired. Three units have special names and paint schemes: 911 Spirit of Our First Responders, 3112 renumbered to 1776 Spirit of Our Armed Forces and 3194 Spirit of Our Law Enforcement. CSXT 3099 lettered "Spirit of West Springfield and Safety Train"; was officially destroyed in Chihuahua, Mexico in 2018 & retired. Units 3049–3069 have been renumbered to 1827, 1834, 1836, 1850, 1851, 1852, 1853, 1869, 1871, 1875, 1877, 1897, 1899, 1900, 1902, 1967, 1972, 1973, 1976, 1981, and 1982 respectively and are painted into various heritage paint schemes. 3175–3249 are Tier 4 credit units.
	Ferromex	100	4600–4699	4600–4659 built in 2006 at the GE plant in Erie, PA. 4660–4699 built in 2007 at the GE plant in Erie, PA.
	Ferromex	50	4800–4849	Delivery started in June 2016. Units numbered 4800–4818 were built at the GE plant in Erie, PA. Units numbered 4819–4849 were built at the GE plant in Fort Worth, Texas. 4815 was wrecked and retired in 2018. 4838 also wrecked and retired.
	Ferromex	30	4850–4879	The first units will be delivered in 2024
	Ferrosur	23	4700–4722	Painted in Ferromex colors.
	GE Transportation	1	2012	Wears the same demonstration scheme as 2011, as well as GECX 2005 and UP 7605 (formerly).
	GE Transportation	1	2010	This is an ES44AC-H prototype, and was rebuilt in 2007 as a hybrid from GECX ES44AC 2005.
	GE Transportation	1	3000	Converted to operate on battery power, the unit was rebuilt from former NextFuel (liquid natural gas/diesel mixture) demonstrator ES44AC 3000.
	Iowa Interstate Railroad	20	500–519	The first set of units, numbered 500–512, were delivered from 2008 to 2009, these are the first new units purchased by this railroad and were originally intended for CSX. The unit 513 was delivered in early 2010. It is painted in a Chicago, Rock Island and Pacific Railroad heritage scheme in honor of this Iowa Interstate predecessor. The units 514–516 were delivered in 2015. 516 is painted in a Rock Island inspired 30th anniversary paint scheme. The units 517–519 are Tier 4 Credit units. They were set for delivery in late 2019.
	Norfolk Southern	166	8000–8165	Units 8025, 8098–8105 and 8114 were painted in schemes of predecessor railroads as part of Norfolk Southern's 30th anniversary. Unit 8099 was wrecked in 2021, and was rebuilt in 2023.
	Norfolk Southern	3	8166–8168	These are Tier 4 Credit units, built concurrently with ET44AC's 3600–3646.
	Norfolk Southern	16	8169–8184	These are Tier 4 Credit units. Unit 8175 was wrecked in December 2021 and was later retired. 8183 and 8184 are painted in OCS livery and is part of the company's "Landmark Series" being named Chicago and Altoona respectively.
	Norfolk Southern	40	8185–8224	Tier 4 credit units for delivery in second half of 2026.
	Sava Transportation (Savatran) SVTX	3	1912, 1982, 1986	Delivered February 2012, these units are numbered for the years that Penn State University won national college football championships.
	Union Pacific	5	5695–5699	Built between January and February 2003, these are pre-production units and classified as C45ACCTE by UP. They have since been renumbered to 5348–5352.
	Union Pacific	938	2010, 5248–5347, 5353–5553, 7345–7468, 7470–7529, 7600–8051	These are classified as C45ACCTE by UP. 5359, 5364, 5412, 5482, 7421, 7856, 7894, and 7914 were wrecked and retired. UP 2010, an ES44AC Boy Scouts of America tribute unit, was unveiled on 31 March 2010, in Houston, Texas to commemorate 100 years of Boy Scouts. The unit was renumbered from 7469. However, in early 2022 it was repainted into the Union Pacific lettered scheme after months of sitting in storage. It kept its number of 2010. In September 2010, UP 7400 was unveiled, featuring a pink ribbon on the side as a tribute to Susan G. Komen for the Cure. 7964 was the 5000th GE Evolution Series locomotive to be built at Erie, PA in June 2012. The banner was removed 4 years later in 2016.
	Union Pacific	296	2520–2569, 2740–2769, 8052–8267	These are the ES44AH model, classified as C45AH by UP. These units are 432,000 lb (196,000 kg) compared to the ES-series standard 416,000 lb (189,000 kg), and are supplied with all required equipment and computer software to be classified as "AH" heavy units. UP's "AH" types are similar to CSXT's, except for their Hi-Ad trucks, and are designated C45AH's by U.P. 2520–2569 and 2740–2769 are Tier 4 Credit units. 2542 wrecked in Texarkana, TX in 2015 and retired. 8210 and 8245 were wrecked in 2024 and retired.
ES44C4
	BNSF	1299	3250–3281, 4200–4299, 5533–5546, 6500–7199	Built 2009–2020. 6943 was wrecked and retired. 4213 was wrecked in 2020 and repaired in 2022. 3250–3281, 4200–4299, and 5533–5546 are Tier 4 credit units.
	BNSF	1299	7921–8291	Built 2013–2015. 8123 and 8153 were wrecked and retired. 7921–7999 are Tier 4 credit units. 8191 was repaired in 2020 after a train collision in 2016.
	BNSF	1299	8318–8399	Built 2015. They are Tier 4 credit units.
	Florida East Coast	24	800–823	Built between November and December 2014. All units have since been converted to use a combination of standard diesel fuel/liquid natural gas mixture, supplied from an external tender towed behind the locomotives. 5 units were leased to FXE in 2024. The unit 814 was wrecked in 2024.
ES44DCi/ES44ACi
	Rio Tinto Group	100	8100–8118, 8119–8199	They ordered the locomotives for operation on their privately owned rail line, operated by Pilbara Iron. The ES44DCi uses the AC6000CW's longer frame to allow space for a heavy duty cooling system to cope with the hot desert environment that the locomotives operate in. Units 8100–8118 were delivered in a predominantly grey paint scheme, while units 8119–8199 feature additional red lettering and striping.
	Rio Tinto Group	55	9100–9154	These units are numbered from 9100 onwards and more are on order. They are the ES44ACi and are painted in the Rio Tinto silver with red stripes and numerals. 6 new units built from late 2025 to early 2026.
	Roy Hill	28	1001–1028	Took delivery of the first 14 out of a total order for 21 ES44ACis in January 2015.
	Rumo Logística	68	2550-2578, 8470-8480, 9593-9620	Deliveries started in 2022 by WABTEC Contagem. They are wide gauge (1,600 mm (5 ft 3 in)).
	MRS Logística	41	7501-7541	Deliveries started in 2022 by WABTEC Contagem. They are wide gauge (1,600 mm (5 ft 3 in)).
	Suzano Papel e Celulose	17	2542-2549, 8457-8465	Deliveries started in 2022 by WABTEC Contagem. They are wide gauge (1,600 mm (5 ft 3 in)).
	Inpasa	2	8468-8469	
ET44AC
	BNSF	50	3625–3674	Ballasted to 436,320 lb. and classified as ET44ACH.
	Canadian National	296	3000–3295	Units 3008, 3023, 3069, and 3115 repainted to commemorative heritage paint schemes. Units 3015 and 3233 painted into unique paint schemes commemorating veterans. Unit 3103 wrecked in 2017 and retired from roster. 3286–3295 were built in early 2023. 3009 wrecked in 2019 and retired. 3121–3132 are former GECX demonstrator units 2029 and 2033–2043, which were rebuilt with new hoods.
	CSX Transportation	325	3250–3574	These are the ET44AH model with HTE. 3440 lettered "Spirit of Ravenna" along with L&N and KSHC markings after attending the announcement of Kentucky Steam buying the Ravenna yard property from CSX. Units 3374 and 3438 wrecked in 2020 and retired. 3415 has the Georgia Railroad emblem. 100 more units on order for 2026
	Canadian Pacific Kansas City	204	KCS 250, 704, 776, 1776, 5000–5024, 7626; CP 7430–7437, 7450–7619	Delivery started in 2018–2019 for KCS. The CPKC units 7430–7437 are former GECX demonstrator units 7001–7008 and acquired in 2024. Those units were originally intended for a cancelled order for Baffinland Iron Mines located in Baffin Island, Canada. 100 units were built in 2025, and 70 more units are on order for 2026, and are undergoing delivery. CP 7615-7619 became the five America 250 commemorative locomotives. 250, 704, 776, 1776, 5000-5024, 7626 wear KCS reporting mark, 7430-7437 and 7450-7615 wear CP reporting mark, as CPKC reporting mark is not official yet.
	Ferromex		TBA	
	GE Transportation	27	2014, 2015, 2023, 2024, 2026, 2027, 2029, 2033–2044, 7001–7008	These are demonstrator units. 2029, 2033–2043 were sold to CN. 2026 and 2027 were sold to NTEC. 7001–7008 were sold to Baffinland Iron Mines and later to CPKC. They were renumbered from units 2025, 2028, 2030–2032, 2020–2022 respectively.
	Navajo Transitional Energy Co.	2	2026–2027	These are former GE demonstrator units of the same numbers with hoods modified to match the standard production units.
	Norfolk Southern	47	3600–3646	3633 wrecked in 2019 and retired in 2020.
	Norfolk Southern	34	3647–3680	N/A
	Union Pacific	171	2570–2739, 4547	These are the ET44AH model, classified as C45AH by UP. Locomotive 4547 painted in honor of Donald Trump.
ET44C4
	BNSF	311	3675–3706, 3721–3999	Built between 2015 and 2020. 3967 was wrecked and retired. 3971 was repaired after damage. Additional units, numbered 3721–3724 were built in late 2019 and therefore restricted to California only. More units, numbered 3675–3706, (built early through mid-2020).
ET23DCM
	Wabtec (GECX)	1	1867	The first ET23DCM built as a demonstrator and engineering test locomotive was constructed by Wabtec in Albia, Iowa and is now used for testing in Erie, Pennsylvania. Former NS 3259.
	CSX Transportation	15	1713-1727	The first two CSX locomotives were built by Wabtec in Albia, Iowa and the remaining thirteen were constructed by CSX at their Huntington Heavy Repair Shop in Huntington, West Virginia. All locomotives were sent through RJ Corman in Lexington, Kentucky for final work before entering service. These are classified as SD23T4 by CSX.
TE33A
	Kazakhstan Temir Zholy	310	TBA	Ordered on the 28 September 2006, they signed an agreement with GE Transportation Systems, ordering the locomotives. The first ten of these were built in GE's Erie, Pennsylvania, plant while the remaining 300 will be assembled at a new plant in Astana, Kazakhstan which was opened by President Nursultan Nazarbayev on 3 July 2009 Delivery is expected between 2009 and 2012. The locomotives are built with dual cabs and are among the first diesel-electric locomotives with AC traction motors to operate in the Commonwealth of Independent States and Ukraine (besides the 2TE25A built by Bryansk Engineering Works, Transmashholding, Russia).
ES59ACi
	China Railway	300	HXN5-0001—HXN5-0650, HXN5-2001–HXN5-2050	Ordered October 2005 and delivered between 2008 and 2009. They were ordered from GE Transportation Systems and Qishuyan Locomotive and Rolling Stock Works. Two have been built at Erie, Pennsylvania, the rest will be assembled by Qishuyan at Changzhou. Classed as the China Railways HXN5.
ES58ACi
	Carajás Railway	97	211-297, 2001-2010	The units were built at GE's Erie plant and delivered in 2009. The prime mover is a GEVO-16. They are wide gauge (1,600 mm (5 ft 3 in)).
ES40ACi
	Egyptian National Railways	80	2400–2479	Delivered 2009. There are two versions: Painted blue for passenger trains and red/black for freight trains.
ES30ACi
	Egyptian National Railways	100	2550–2649	Ordered 2017, They are valued at $575 million that can be used for both passengers or freight rail. The first 10 units were delivered in November 2019.
ES43ACi
	Pakistan Railways	55	9001–9055	They are made for 1,676 mm gauge. Deliveries are expected during 2017. See Locomotives of Pakistan.
	TransGuinéen	150	TBA	Deliveries started in May 2025.
ES44ACM
	Norfolk Southern	8	7781–7788	These units are rebuilt by Wabtec from ES44DC locomotives in 2026.
ES43BBi
	Rumo Logística	40	640-678, 8326	Deliveries started in 2016. They are narrow gauge (1,000 mm (3 ft 3 3/8 in)), with a B-B+B-B wheel arrangement.
	Klabin	10	8325, 8327-8331, 8455-8456, 8466-8467	Deliveries started in 2015. They are narrow gauge (1,000 mm (3 ft 3 3/8 in)), with a B-B+B-B wheel arrangement.
	VL!	28	8444-8454, 8797-8808, 6200-6204	Deliveries started in 2018. They are narrow gauge (1,000 mm (3 ft 3 3/8 in)), with a B-B+B-B wheel arrangement. The first units were built by GE do Brasil, while the newer ones are built by Wabtec.

== Licensed production ==
=== Australia ===
In 2002, GE and UGL launched the Evolution Series locomotive, and in 2009, continued their partnership for another 10 years for UGL to distribute and sell GE locomotives in Australia. The locomotives are Pacific National 94-class and designated as C44ESACi.

=== India ===
In November 2015, it was announced Indian Railways and GE would engage in a 11-year joint venture in which GE would hold a majority stake of 74%, to provide a mix of 1,000 diesel locomotives of type ES43ACmi which are 4,500 horsepower and type ES57ACi which are 6,000 horsepower each. Indian Railways designated these 1,676 mm (broad gauge) locomotives as the WDG-4G class and WDG-6G class respectively. General Electric has invested ₹2,052 crore (US$305 million) for its construction. In the $2.6 Billion deal, Indian Railways would purchase 1,000 goods locomotives a year for ten years beginning in 2017; the locomotives would be modified versions of the GE Evolution series. Diesel Locomotive Factory, Marhowrah was built by GE for the manufacture of the locomotives.

=== South Africa ===
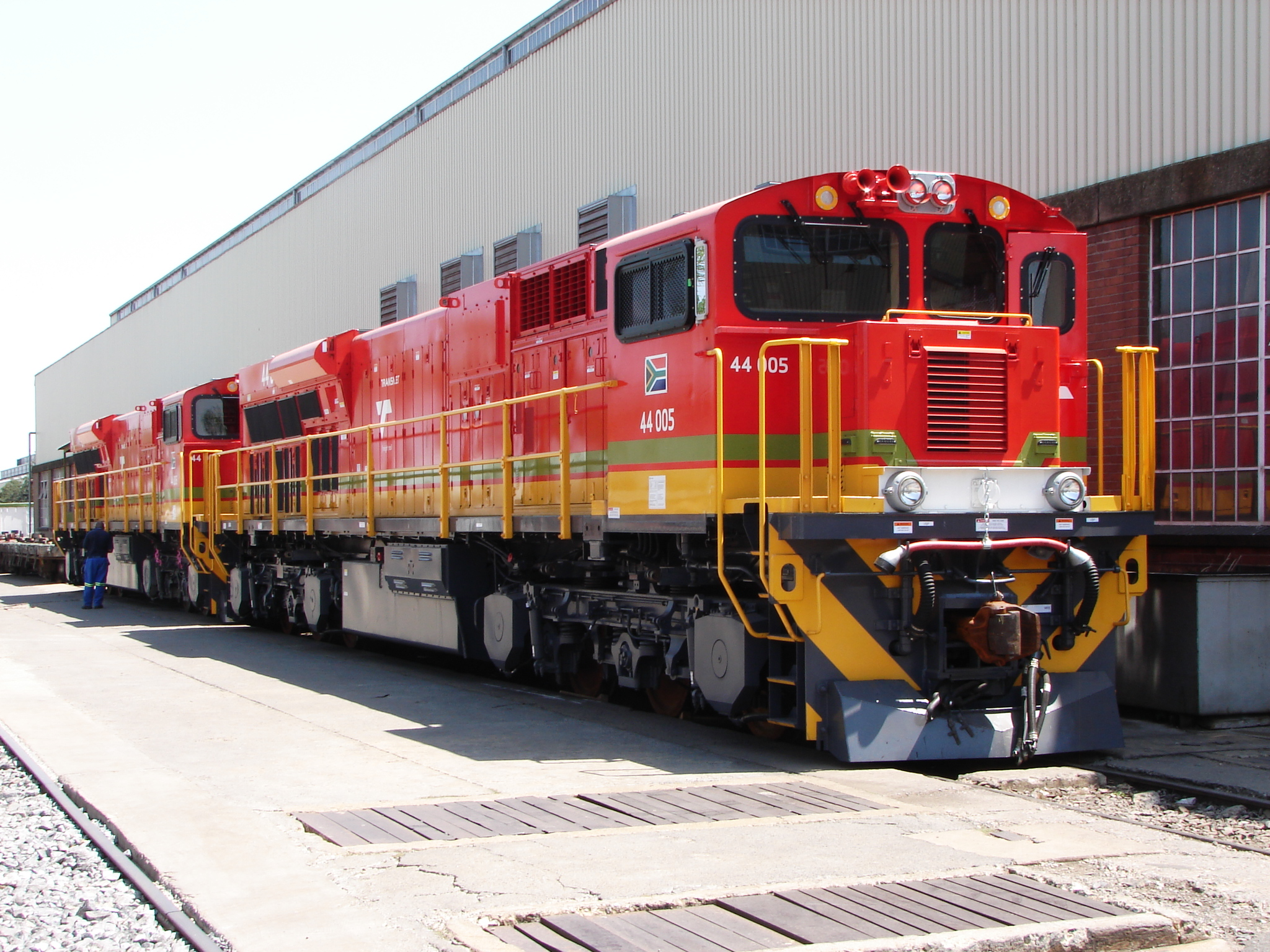
TFR Class No. 44-005

Transnet Engineering in South Africa has a license to manufacture 233 4,200 hp (3,100 kW) 3 ft 6 in (1,067 mm) Cape gauge ES40ACi locomotives for Transnet Freight Rail, with core components including GEVO-12 engines supplied from the United States.

The first six of these Class 44-000 locomotives were built in Erie, Pennsylvania, in April and July 2015. In October 2015, the first of the 227 South African-built locomotives was nearing completion at Transnet Engineering's Koedoespoort shops in Pretoria.

== See also ==
- EMD SD70 series, a similarly powerful locomotive produced by EMD in response to GE's predecessor of the Evolution Series, the Dash 9 Series.
- Wabtec FLXDrive, a battery-electric locomotive built by Wabtec based on the Evolution Series design.
