= Railway Settlement Roza =

- City
- Location in Uttar Pradesh, India
- Coordinates: 27°34′14″N 80°05′53″E
- Country: India
- State: Uttar Pradesh
- District: Shahjahanpur

Population (2001)
  - Total: 10,499

Languages
  - Official: Hindi
- Time zone: UTC+5:30 (IST)

Railway Settlement Roza is a town and a nagar panchayat in Shahjahanpur district in the Indian state of Uttar Pradesh.

== Demographics ==
As of 2001 India census, Railway Settlement Roza had a population of 10,499. Males constitute 54% of the population and females 46%. Railway Settlement Roza has an average literacy rate of 68%, higher than the national average of 59.5%: male literacy is 75%, and female literacy is 58%. In Railway Settlement Roza, 14% of the population is under 6 years of age.

== Transport ==
=== Rail ===
Roza Junction railway station is situated near NH 24. It serves nearby cities like Sitapur, Shahjahanpur, and Bareilly.
