= Meelis (given name) =

Male given name

- Gender: Male
- Language: Estonian
- Name day: 31 January

Origin
- Region of origin: Estonia

Other names
- Related names: Meeli

Meelis is an Estonian masculine given name. The feminine form of Meelis is Meeli.

People named Meelis include:

- Meelis Aasmäe (born 1972), cross-country skier
- Meelis Atonen (born 1966), entrepreneur and politician
- Meelis Friedenthal (born 1973), fantasy writer and theologian
- Meelis Hainsoo (born 1972; also known as Hainz), singer (:et)
- Meelis Kanep (born 1983), chess grandmaster
- Meelis Kivisild (bor 1990), volleyball player
- Meelis Kiili (born 1965), Brigadier General
- Meelis Kompus (born 1980), radio and TV journalist
- Meelis Kubo (born 1982), magician
- Meelis Lao (born 1966), businessman
- Meelis Lindmaa (born 1970), football player
- Meelis Loit (born 1971), fencer and Olympic competitor
- Meelis Mälberg (born 1970), politician
- Meelis Mandel (born 1971), journalist (:et)
- Meelis Muhu (born 1972), documentary film director, producer and actor
- Meelis Paavel (born 1963), economic geographer and politician
- Meelis Pai (born 1968), theatre leader and theatre producer
- Meelis Peitre (born 1990), football player
- Meelis Rämmeld (born 1971), actor
- Meelis Rooba (born 1977), football player
- Meelis Veilberg (born 1961), long-distance runner
- Meelis Vind (born 1964), composer and clarinetist

Fictional characters

- Meelis, the main character from Enn Kippel's 1941 novel Meelis
