= Promet =

Promet may refer to:

- HRP-2 Promet – Japanese technology development project
- Promet Group – Czech industrial group
- Promet Split
- Aleksander Promet (1879–1938), Estonian painter
- Lilli Promet (1922–2007), Estonian writer
