= GE U36C =

Diesel-electric locomotive

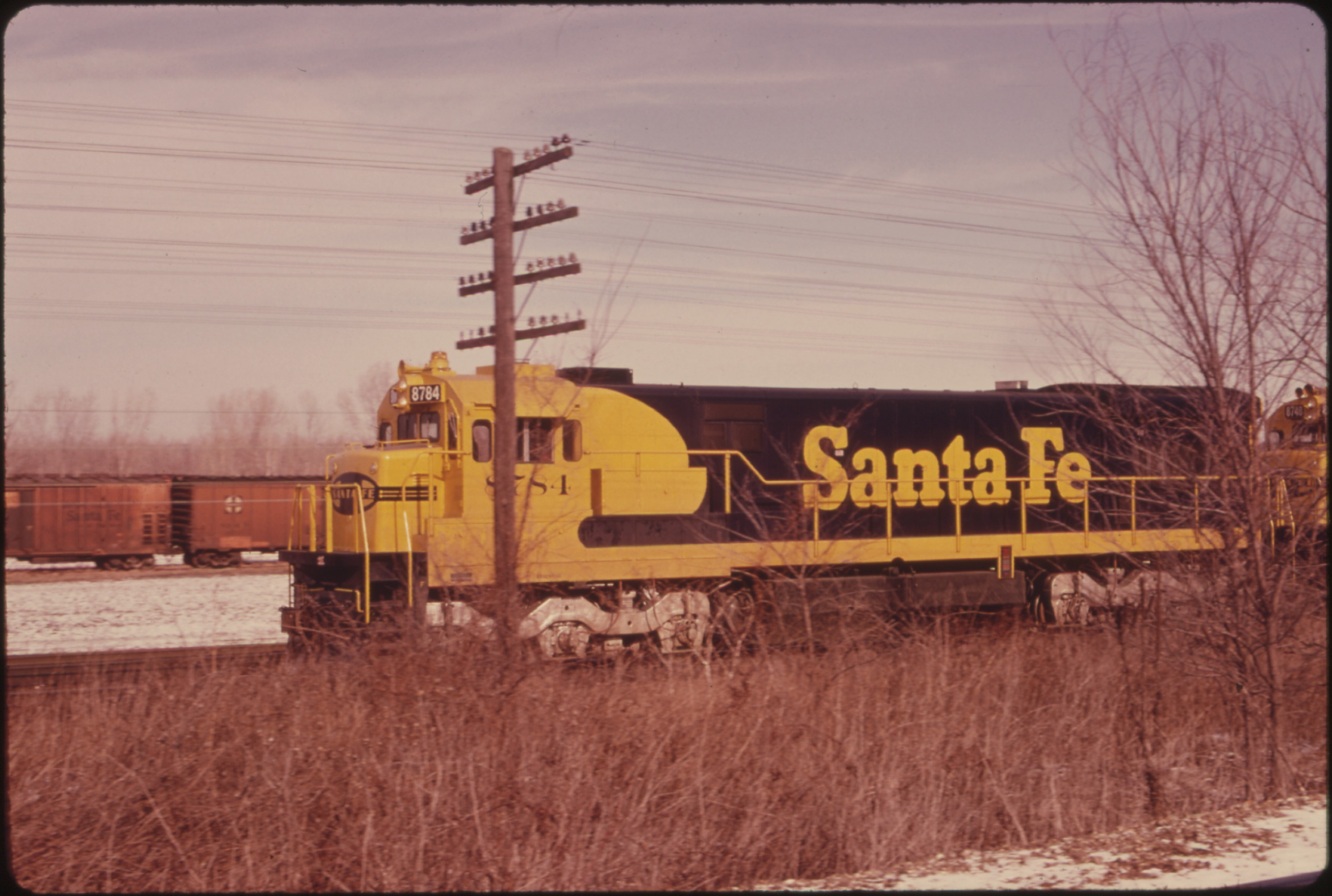
- ATSF #8784 at Johnson City, Kansas in 1975.
Type and origin
- Power type: Diesel-electric
- Builder: GE Transportation Systems
- Model: U36C
- Build date: 1971 – 1975
- Total produced: 238
Specifications
- Configuration
  - AAR: C-C
- Gauge: 4 ft 8 1/2 in (1,435 mm)
- Length: 67 ft 3 in (20.50 m)
- Prime mover: GE FDL-16
- Cylinders: 16
Performance figures
- Power output: 3,600 hp (2,700 kW)

The GE U36C is a 3600 hp diesel-electric locomotive model built by GE Transportation Systems.

The length of the locomotive was 67 ft 3 in (20.50 m), standard for U30C, U33C, U34CH, U36C, U36CG, C30-7 and C36-7. The U36C also had steel capped pistons.

218 units were produced between October 1971 and February 1975 for railroads in the United States and Mexico. A further 20 units of model U36CG (the passenger service variant of the U36C) were built for use in Mexico.

== Rebuilds ==
Between 1985 and 1987 Santa Fe's Cleburne shops rebuilt 70 U36Cs #8700-8769 into C30-7 standards and were reclassified as SF30Cs. As of 2022, Unit 9501 has been donated to the Arizona State Railroad Museum. Unit 9501 is currently in storage at the Grand Canyon Railway.

== Original Owners ==
Image	Railroad	Quantity	Numbers	Notes
Atchison, Topeka and Santa Fe Railway		100	8700-8799	8700-8735, 8764-8799 rebuilt to SF30Cs in 1985, C30-7 specs and renumbered 9500-9569
Chicago, Milwaukee, St. Paul and Pacific Railroad		4	5800-5803	
	Clinchfield Railroad	7	3600-3606	to Seaboard Coast Line 2125-2131 after traded for SCL SD45 2438-2044
	Erie Lackawanna Railway	13	3316-3328	To Conrail 6587-6599, renumbered 6885-6896
	Ferrocarril del Pacífico	10	409-418	
	Ferrocarriles Nacionales de México	104	8900-8986, 9300-9316	8938-8957 were model U36CG

== Preservation ==
- Nationales de Mexico #8941 is preserved in Barrio de la Estación, Aguascalientes, Mexico.
- One SF30C rebuild, Minnesota Commercial #50 (ex-ATSF #9501) is owned by the Arizona State Railway Museum in Williams, Arizona.
