= Operail =

Company based in Estonia

AS Operail
- Formerly: AS EVR Cargo
- Type: State owned
- Industry: Transport
- Founded: 2009
- Headquarters: Tallinn, Estonia
- Key people: Raul Toomsalu (CEO); Kuldar Leis (Chairman)
- Services: Freight transport Rolling stock leasing Locomotive maintenance and modernisation
- Revenue: ▲€72.91 million
- Operating income: ▲€15.72 million
- Net income: ▲€9.22 million
- Owner: Government of Estonia
- Number of employees: 694 (2018)
- Subsidiaries: AS Operail Leasing; WagonPro Holding Oy
- Website: operail.com

AS Operail, formerly AS EVR Cargo, is a railway logistics company located in Tallinn, Estonia. Its sole shareholder is the Government of Estonia.

== History ==
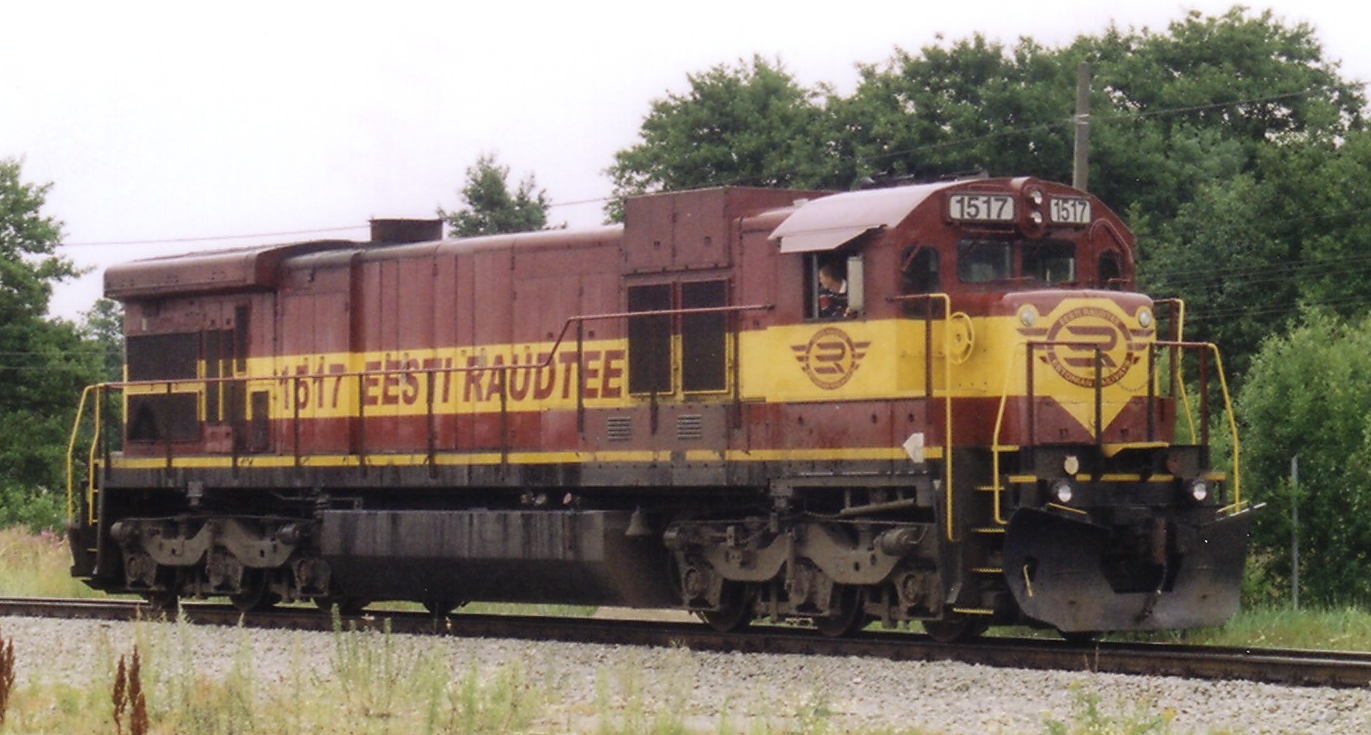
GE C36-7i 1517 in 2005

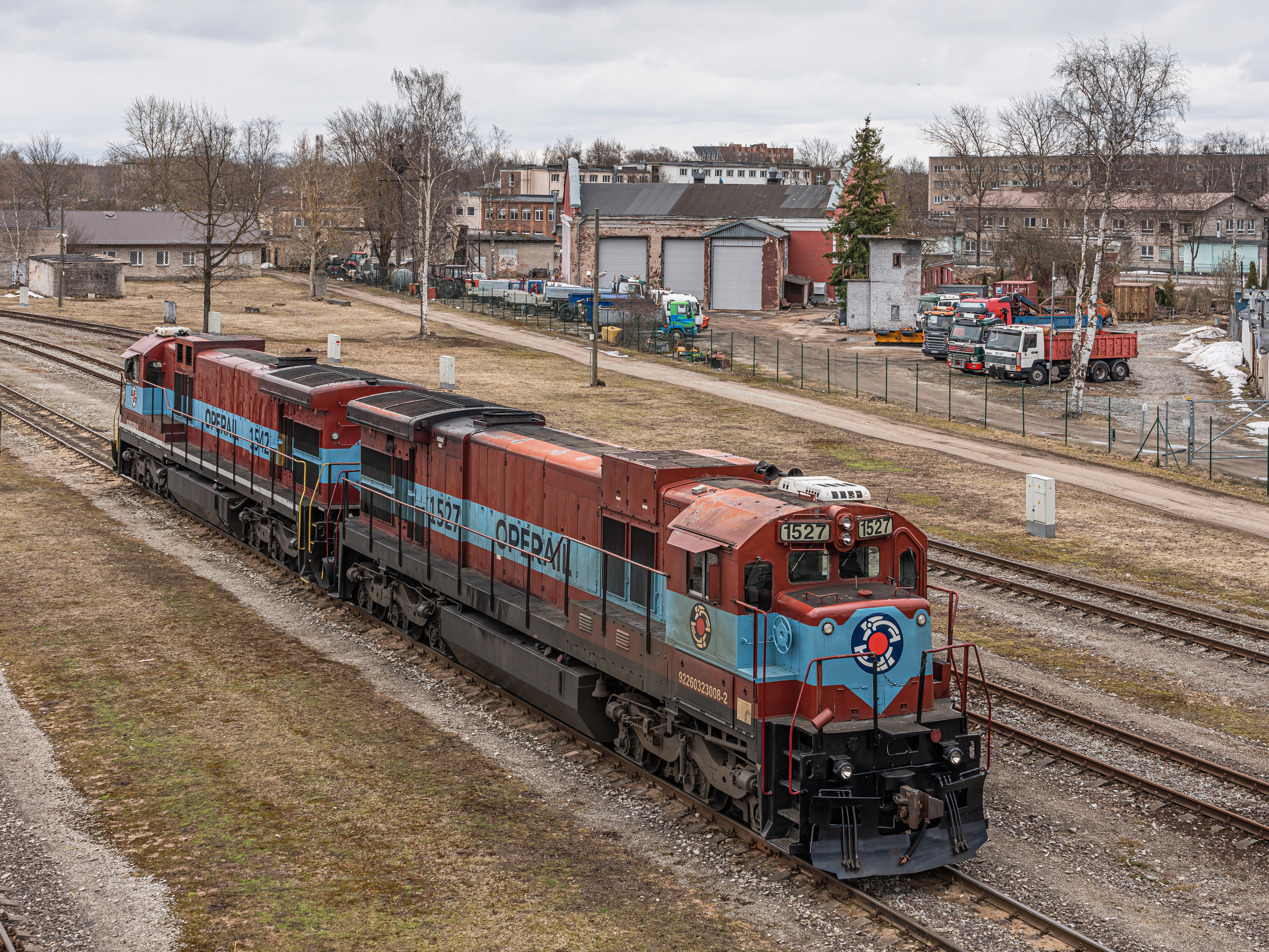
GE C36-7i 1527 in 2022

The company was established as EVR Cargo in 2009; initially, it was structured as a subsidiary of Eesti Raudtee that was mainly focused upon freight transportation. During 2012, the company was legally separated from Eesti Raudtee, but remained under Estonian government ownership. In June 2018, the company was rebranded as Operail; amongst other reasons, the name change was intended to reflect that the company is involved in other business sectors beyond that of freight transportation, such as rolling stock leasing, maintenance, and modernisation.

In the same year, in collaboration with CZ Loko, Operail rebuilt a GE C30-7Ai locomotive into the first C30-M at its Tapa depot. While the original frames and bogies were retained, much of the superstructure was demolished and replaced; as such, a new centrally-positioned driver's cab was installed along with a Caterpillar 3512C HD diesel engine, capable of generating up to 1.55 MW. In April 2019, Operail announced that it would suspend its wagon repair activities at Tapa depot so that it could concentrate its resources on locomotive construction. In January 2020, it was announced that further locomotive conversions had been arranged. During 2021, the company completed work on its first freight locomotive to be powered by LNG. In October 2021, Operail signed a letter of intent with OÜ Stargate Rail to develop a prototype hydrogen-powered shunting locomotives; as many as 40 locomotives may be converted in a similar fashion.

During May 2018, the company, together with the railway companies of Latvia and Lithuania, signed an agreement to jointly establish the Amber Train freight transportation route from Šeštokai through Riga to Tallinn. On 13 September 2022, the first Amber Train service departed Muuga for the Kaunas terminal; goods from the terminal will also be transported to Muuga on the return journey, the majority of which will be sent onwards to Finland.

During the 2010s and early 2020s, the group opted to expand its rolling stock leasing activities; by 2022, these included the wagon leasing businesses AS Operail Leasing and Operail Leasing Finland. That same year, Operail's chairman Raul Toomsalu attributed the wagon leasing business as having been a key contributor to the company's financial performance. Reportedly, by the end of 2021, 94 percent of the company's wagons had leasing contracts in place.

In October 2019, Operail announced that it was setting up a new subsidiary to haul freight in Finland as a part of its increasing efforts to pursue international opportunities. During June 2020, it was announced that the Finnish Transport and Communications Agency (Traficom) had approved the safety management system of Operail Finland, a new subsidiary that was being set up to operate freight services in the Finnish market. On 3 November of that year, Operail Finland ran its first freight service, hauled by GE PowerHaul diesel locomotives, it carried dry bulk freight for the Finnish port operator Rauanheimo along the Vainikkala - Koverhar route. In February 2021, Operail signed a partnership agreement with Oiltanking for the transportation of an annual freight volume of chemicals in excess of one million tons along the Vainikkala-Kotka route. During 2021, the first full year of operations for Operail's Finnish freight transport business, a total of one million tons of goods were reportedly transported by the company.

In July 2022, Operail had reportedly encountered operational hardships, which were largely attributed to the economic and political consequences of the 2022 Russian invasion of Ukraine, including the enactment of sanctions on Russia that impacted some of the company's rail traffic. Rail freight volumes had more than halved as certain goods, such as Russian fertilisers and Belarusian oil products, were no longer being carried; the company was reportedly looking at new opportunities, including the transportation of Ukrainian grain by rail. Operail was reportedly looking as opportunities in central Asia and China with which to replace goods formerly sourced from Russia. Furthermore, amongst the mitigating actions taken by the company were efforts to direct its rental wagons away from regions considered to be of a high risk.

== Performance and organisation ==
In 2018, Operail transported 13.4 million tonnes of freight: mainly fertilizers, mineral fuels, and oil shale; its operating income was €72.7 million, while a net profit of €9.2 million was recorded. Accordingly, in early 2019, the company paid 1.5 million euros in dividends to the Estonian state.

In 2021, Operail's container freight volume within Estonia increased to 56,429 TEU, a 26 per cent rise over the year prior; its revenue reportedly increased to €73 million, a 12 per cent increase over the previous year. The group’s net profit without extraordinary items was nearly €4 million, a 43% increase compared to the previous year; after deducting the extraordinary items, including asset write-downs, the group incurred a loss of €5 million. Furthermore, Operail opted to invest a total of €13.7 million into its operations that year.

During 2019, it was reported that the Government of Estonia was planning to sell 49 percent of the shares in Operail. In May 2021, it was decided to transfer the group’s non-strategic business areas, these being those that do not directly pertain to the movement of rail freight on Estonia's railways as a part of the privatisation initiative. That same year, the company was restructured to legally separate all of Operail's business sectors, from freight transportation in Estonia, its Finnish freight business, rolling stock leasing, and the maintenance & repair of rolling stock. During September 2022, Operail begun to sell off these non-strategic assets individually to private investors through a competitive bidding process organised by a special advisor; the process has been delayed by the start of the Russian invasion of Ukraine earlier that year. The company has experienced substantial financial losses as a result of suspension of transit to and from Russia and Belarus.
