= Dash 7 =

Dash 7 may refer to:

- DASH7, a wireless sensor and actuator network protocol
- De Havilland Canada Dash 7, aircraft manufactured by De Havilland Canada
- GE Dash 7 Series, railway locomotive manufactured by GE Transportation Systems
- Dash 7, a song directly referencing the aircraft, by the American alt-country band Wilco, on the album A.M. (1995)
