= Powerhaul =

Powerhaul may refer to:

- The General Electric PowerHaul P616 internal combustion engine
- The General Electric/Tulomsas PowerHaul freight locomotive built for Freightliner UK as the Class 70, and also for the Turkish State Railways
