= GE C32-8 =

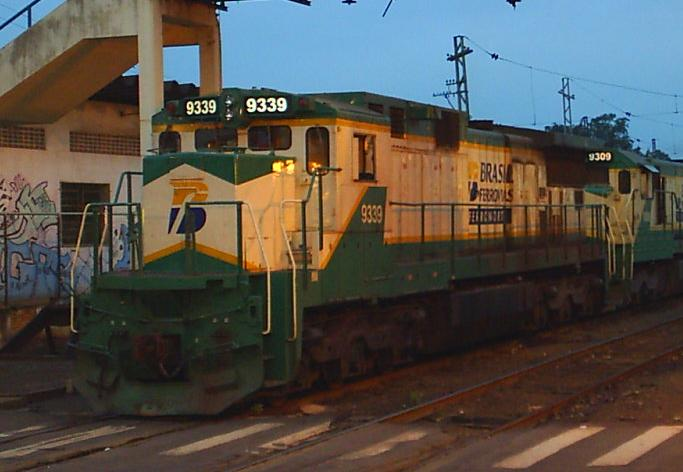
- A Brazil Railway C32-8, ex-Conrail, 2007
Type and origin
- Power type: Diesel-electric
- Builder: GE Transportation Systems
- Model: C32-8
- Build date: 1984
- Total produced: 10
Specifications
- Configuration
  - AAR: C-C
- Gauge: 4 ft 8 1/2 in (1,435 mm)
- Prime mover: GE 7FDL-12
- Cylinders: 12
Performance figures
- Power output: 3,200 hp (2.39 MW)
Career
- Locale: United States
- Disposition: Unknown

The GE C32-8 was a 6-axle diesel-electric locomotive model built by GE Transportation Systems in 1984. It is part of the GE Dash 8 Series of freight locomotives.

Only 10 of these 3,200 hp (2,390 kW) locomotives were built. They were some of the first locomotives built in the Dash-8 line with all 10 going to Conrail as road numbers 6610 to 6619. When delivered they wore the standard Conrail Can Opener (Wheel on Rail) paint scheme.

In 1997, Conrail assigned all 10 units to "Ballast Express" service. They were repainted into a Gray version of the Quality scheme.

== History ==
In 1984, the C32-8 was made in the 'Super-Seven' series of GE locomotives. It was essentially a V12 engine variant of the C39-8, another locomotive made for Conrail. After they were put into the Ballast Express in 1997, they all got repainted into a grey livery. In 1999, when Conrail was split between the CSX Transportation and Norfolk Southern Railway, they saw limited service with the 2 railroads until 2001 due to their orphan status, and lacking overhauls of typical of others. 1 C32-8 was sent to Brazil as a donor for Brazil Railway's GE Dash 7 units. C32-8 9339 was functional as of September 2006. It is unknown as to what 9339's fate is.

To this day, it is known almost all, if not all C32-8s have been scrapped and/or cannibalized for other locomotives such as the before mentioned Dash 7s.

It seems that until the 2010s possibly, there was a lone survivor somewhere in the Junction City Quarry. There are, however, rumors of that locomotive having been scrapped, which there is a good possibility that it has been scrapped.

== See also ==
- List of GE locomotives
