= Meeli =

- Gender: Female
- Language: Estonian
- Name day: 12 September

Origin
- Region of origin: Estonia

Other names
- Related names: Meelis

Meeli is an Estonian feminine given name. The masculine version is Meelis.

People named Meeli include:

- Meeli Kõiva (born 1960), artist
- Meeli Sööt (born 1937), actress
- Meeli Truu (1946–2013), architect
