= North Rail =

Finnish freight rail operator

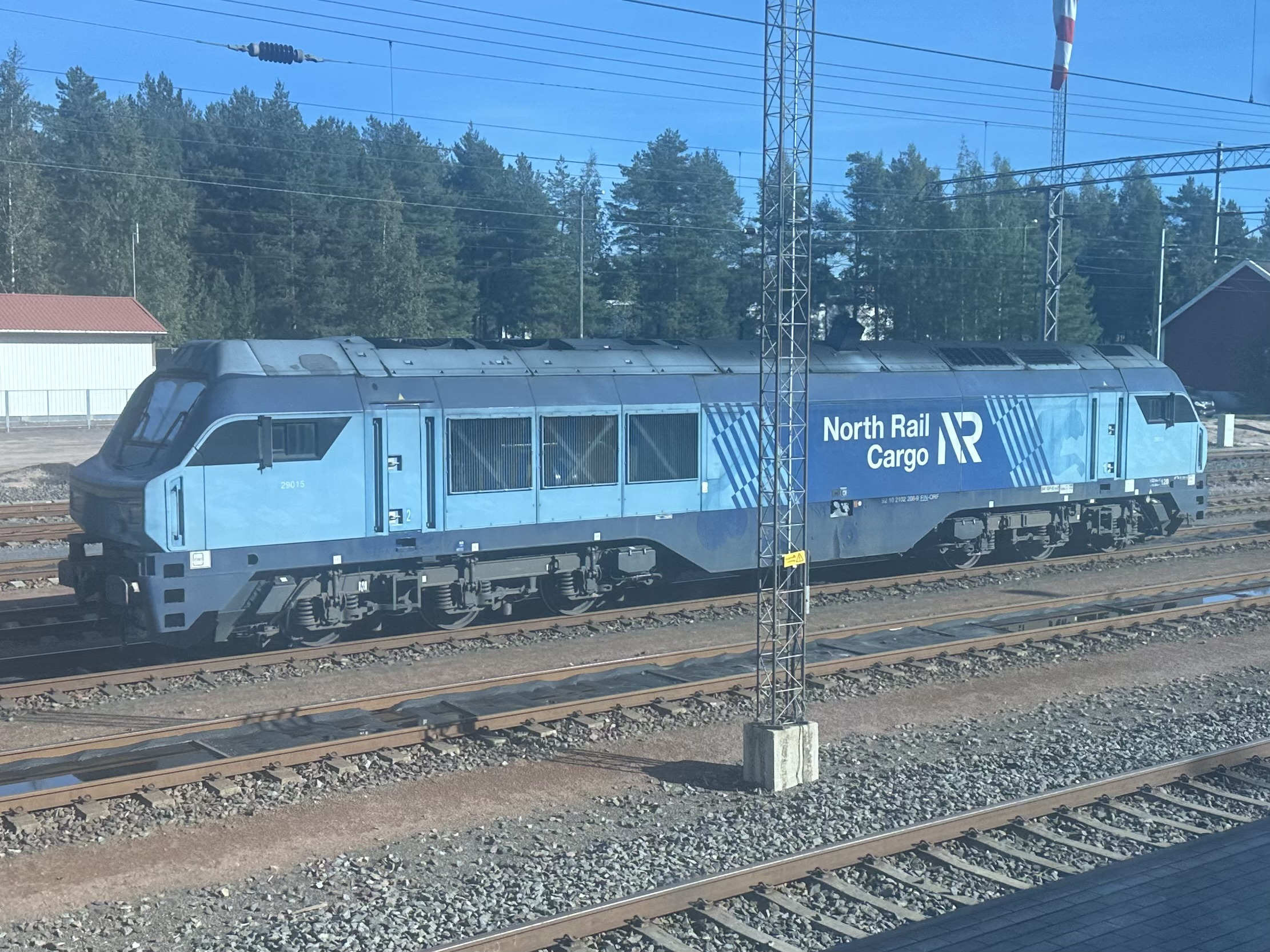
- North Rail Class Dr20 diesel locomotive
- Type: osakeyhtiö
- Industry: Rail transport
- Founded: 2019; 7 years ago
- Area served: Finland
- Website: northrailcargo.com

North Rail Oy is a private Finnish freight railway operator. The company was founded in 2019 as a subsidiary of the Estonian railway operator Operail with the name Operail Finland Oy, and got its current name in 2023 when it was acquired by Finnish logistics company Nurminen Logistics and other investors. The company operates using nine class Dr20 and three class Dr21 diesel locomotives.

The company started transporting nickel and fertilizers from the Russian border to Finland after the state-owned VR Group withdrew its cross-border traffic following the Russian invasion of Ukraine in 2022. Fertilizer traffic was terminated in June 2026 after Russia increased export tariffs applied on them.
