= Ralf Parve =

Estonian writer

Ralf Parve (until 1978 Ralf Perman; 25 June 1919 in Rakvere – 29 April 2011 in Tallinn) was an Estonian writer. He used several pseudonyms: Nähvits, Mart Raju, and Rahula Pärn, as well as the SMERSh and KGB agent name Peiker.

In the 1940s, he was the editor of the youth magazine Pioneer. During World War II, he was mobilized into the Red Army. From 1951 onward, he was a professional author.

From 1947 to 1989, he was a member of the CPSU. In 1945, he became a member of the Estonian Writers' Union.

His spouse was the writer Lilli Promet.

He died in Tallinn, and he is buried in Metsakalmistu Cemetery.

== Selected works ==
- 1958: poetry collection Avatud värav (The Open Gate)
- 1964: poetry collection Lüüriline stenogramm (Lyrical Shorthand)
- 1969: selection Tuulenooled (Wind-Arrows)
