= UGL Rail PH37ACmai =

Model of diesel locomotive

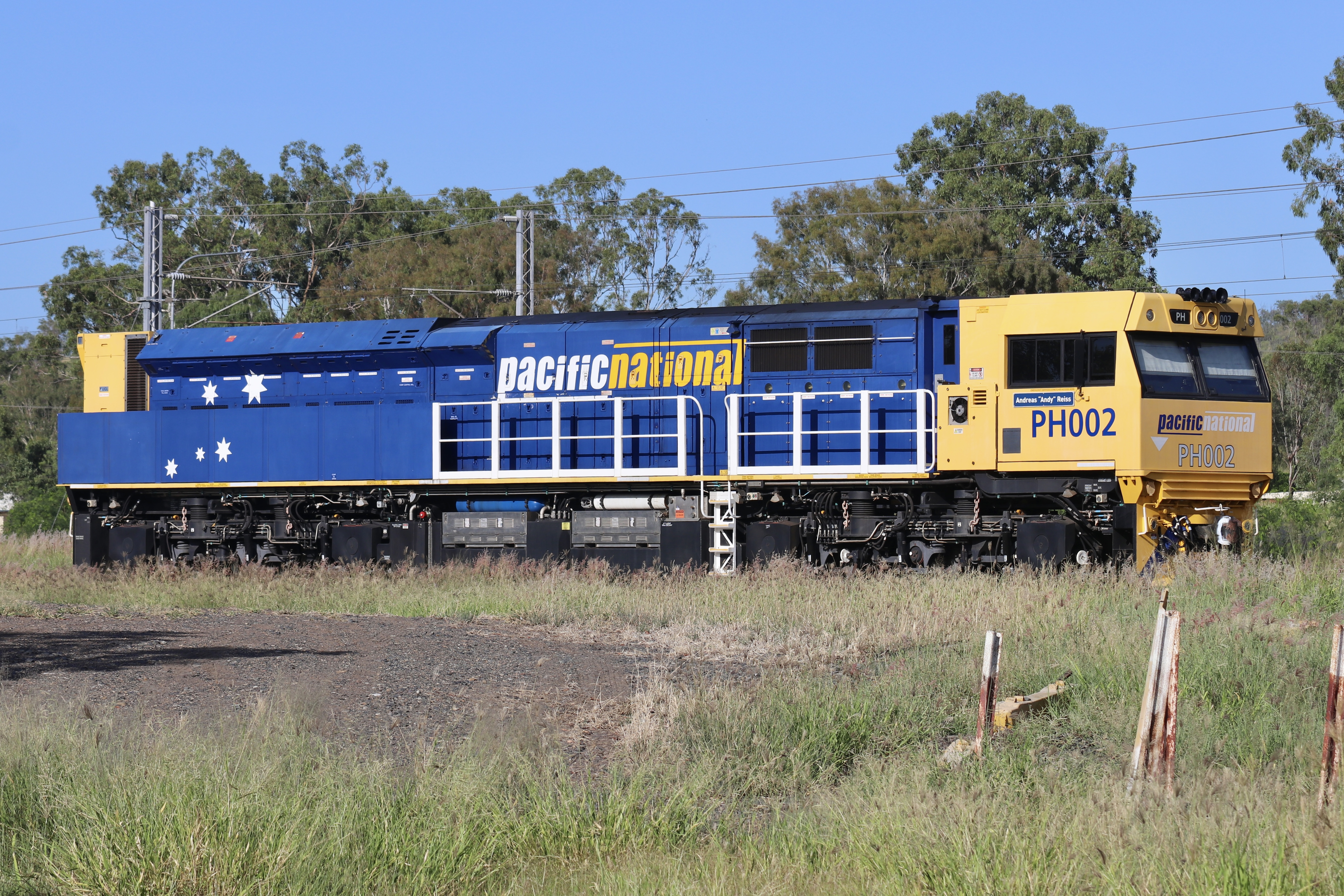
- PH002 "Andreas (Andy) Reiss" at Kabra, QLD
Type and origin
- Power type: Diesel-electric
- Builder: UGL Rail, Broadmeadow
- Model: General Electric PH37ACmai
- Build date: 2014
- Total produced: 3 units
Specifications
- Configuration
  - UIC: Co-Co
- Gauge: 1,067 mm (3 ft 6 in)
- Length: 20.87 m (68 ft 6 in)
- Width: 2.85 m (9 ft 4 in)
- Height: 3.87 m (12 ft 8 in)
- Loco weight: 120 tonnes
- Fuel type: Diesel
- Fuel capacity: 10,500 L (2,300 imp gal)
- Prime mover: GE Jenbacher P616
- Cylinders: 16
- Loco brake: Air
- Train brakes: Air
Performance figures
- Maximum speed: 100 km/h (62 mph)
- Power output: 2,760 kW (3,700 hp)
Career
- Operators: Pacific National
- Class: PH
- Number in class: 3
- Numbers: PH001–PH003
- Locale: Newlands & Goonyella coal networks
- Delivered: 2014
- First run: 2014
- Current owner: Pacific National
- Disposition: 3 in service

The UGL Rail PH37ACmai is a model of Australian diesel locomotives built by UGL Rail in Broadmeadow, New South Wales, in 2014. The frames were fabricated in Townsville, Queensland.

== History ==
In November 2011 UGL Rail announced it would develop a 3 ft 6 in (1,067 mm) gauge version of the GE PowerHaul locomotive.

UGL are manufacturing three prototypes at their Broadmeadow factory. They are similar in appearance to the UGL Rail C44aci class.

In July 2016, UGL secured a contract to supply three units to Pacific National for use in Queensland. These entered service in 2018 as the PH class, numbered PH001-003. They are used on Newlands and Goonyella network coal trains in Queensland.
