= Pioneer (Estonian magazine) =

Estonian Youth Magazine

- Editor: Ralf Parve (1940–1941); Enn Kippel (1941); Ralf Parve (1947–1948); Ants Sild
- Frequency: Semimonthly (1940–1941); Monthly (1945–1989)
- First issue: October 1940
- Final issue: December 1989
- Based in: Tallinn, Estonian SSR, USSR
- Language: Estonian

Pioneer was an Estonian youth magazine, the mouthpiece of the Pioneer Organization of the Estonian SSR, published between 1940 and 1989. The magazine was published by the Estonian Communist Party Central Committee Publishing House in Tallinn.

The magazine started appearing twice a month in October 1940, with issue no. 1 on October 11, 1940. From 1945 to 1989, it was published once a month. Issues 1 and 2 in 1941 appeared in two printings, and Pioneer was not published from 1942 to 1944. The last issue of Pioneer was published in December 1989. In 1990, the magazine was renamed Põhjanael (Polaris), and in 1995 it was changed to Põhjatäht (North Star).

From 1946 to 1971, the supplement Abiks noortele tehnikutele, naturalistidele, sportlastele, isetegevuslastele jt. (Help for Young Technicians, Naturalists, Athletes, Self-Employed People, and Others) was published with the magazine (from 1949 to 1956 between individual issues, and from 1957 to 1971 together with issues 1–12). In 1989, the special issue Eetser = Estonian Scouting Movement was published, as well as the new year's special issue Põhjatäht.

The publishers of Pioneer were:

- The Central Committee of the Leninist Young Communist League of Estonia (ELKNÜ KK; 1941–1988, no. 8)
- The Council of the Pioneer Organization of the Estonian SSR (1958–1988, no. 8)
- The Ministry of Education of the Estonian SSR (1946, no. 3 – 1950)
- The People's Commissariat of Education of the Estonian SSR (1941–1946, no. 2)

In 1940, the editor-in-chief of the magazine was Enn Vallak and the managing editor was Ralf Parve. In April 1941, Enn Kippel became the editor. The cover illustrations were created by Alo Hoidre (nos. 2–4), Paul Reeveer (no. 6), and H. Ruus (no. 5).

In 1940, the printing house was the nationalized Tallinn Estonian Publishing Company for nos. 1–5, and the renamed Kommunist printing house for no. 6.
