= Meelis Lao =

Estoninan businessman

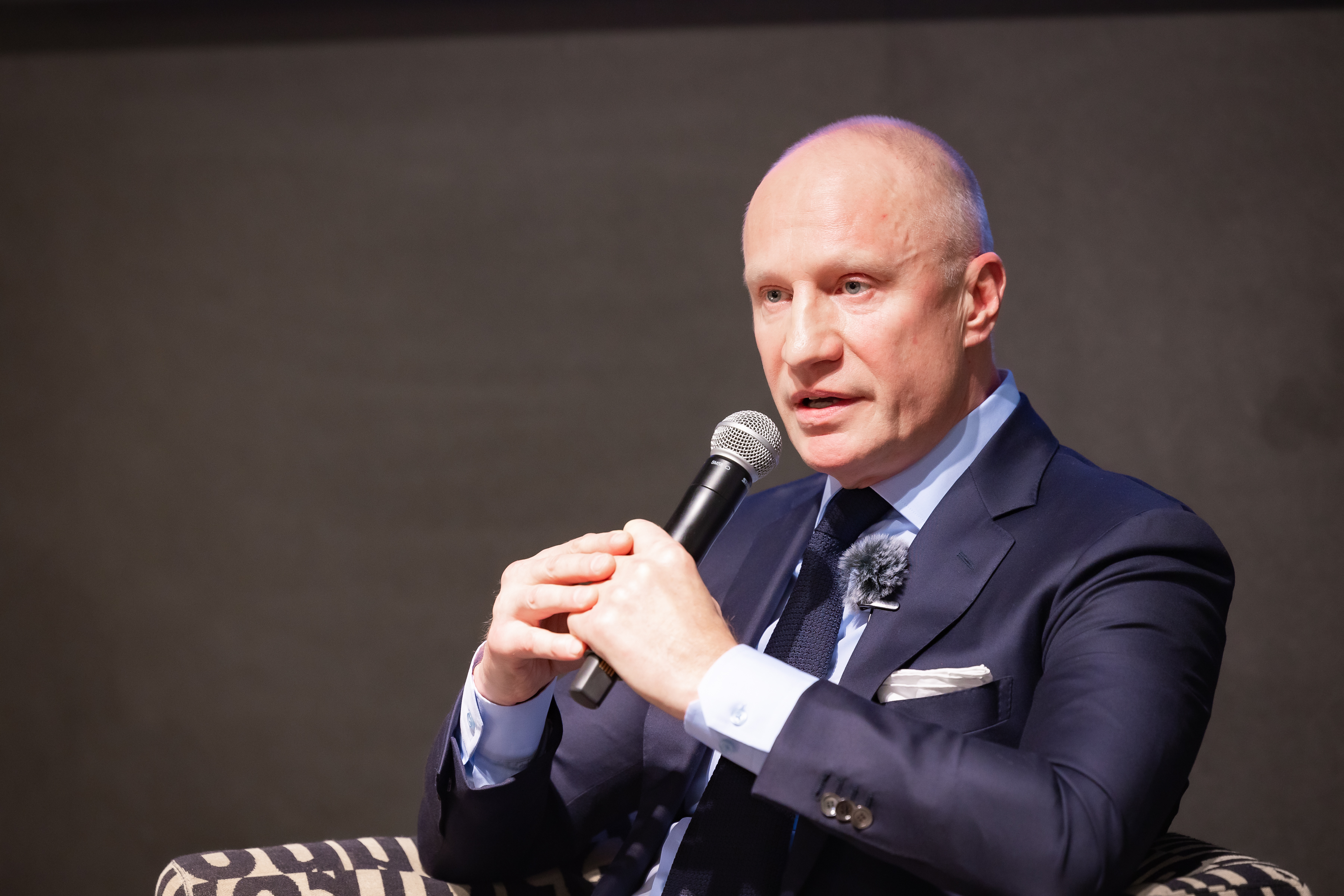
- Born: April 10, 1966 (age 59)
- Known for: Alleged leader of the Estonian organized crime
- Children: 3
- Website: theeasterngodfather.com

Meelis Lao (born April 10, 1966) is an Estonian businessman who has been considered one of the leaders of the Estonian organized crime.

== Criminal background ==
In 1988, Harju County Court sentenced Meelis Lao to a suspended prison term for unlawfully taking away someone's freedom.

On December 13, 1995, Lao was shot in the chest with an AK-47 in front of the Flexer sports club on Tartu Road in Tallinn. He was saved by a mobile phone in his chest pocket, which the bullet hit.

On March 4, 1997, Lao suffered severe injuries in an IED explosion at the same location.

In 1997, the Helsinki District Court sentenced him to an eight-month suspended prison term for smuggling 18,000 liters of spirits into Finland.

During the 2000s, Estonian media linked Meelis Lao with Konstantin "Mogila" Jakovlev, an authoritative figure in St. Petersburg's organized crime, who was allegedly closely associated with Lao in the fuel transit business.

== Business activities ==
Meelis Lao was the owner of the fruit wholesale company Megaviljad.

He, along with Jüri Mõis, Even Tudeberg, Hannes Tamjärv, and Toomas Sildmäe, co-founded the transit company AS Meta-Eks, which operated in the fuel transit business using approximately 1550 railway tankers until 2008.

== Political involvement ==
In 2001, during the time Jüri Mõis, a close friend of Meelis Lao, was the Tallinn Mayor, Lao was identified by the FBI as a representative of St. Petersburg's organized crime in Estonia. Despite these allegations, Lao became involved in Estonian politics, actively fighting alongside Mõis to maintain the Tallinn ruling coalition. Lao declined these allegations by saying:

"I'm not ready to be a deputy mayor yet"

— Meelis Lao

In 2001, Eesti Päevaleht reported documents in its possession indicating that through Meelis Lao, Mayor Jüri Mõis handed the Seaplane Harbour area to the hands of an illegal construction company.

Lao earned the title of "problem solver" already in the late 1980s when he kept the Russian racketeer away from the founders of Hansabank. His path has repeatedly crossed with the founders of Hansabank. Lao's name was linked with Hannes Tamjärv and Jüri Mõis in the privatization scandal of Estonian Railway. They were associated with Rail Estonia, who made the best offer but was excluded from privatization due to the involvement of Antonio Angotti. Angotti was wanted in the United States for financial crimes and had used the alias Antonio Angotti in Estonia.

During Mõis's tenure as the Mayor of Tallinn, Lao enticed Russian politicians into Mõis's supporters' camp. However, when Robert Lepikson revealed that Mart Laar had targeted Edgar Savisaar's photo, Lao and Mõis claimed that Lepikson was attempting to extort Laar.

Meelis Lao helped Rain Lõhmus resolve the dispute among Balteco shareholders.

"Meelis Lao's use in reaching agreements or as leverage in negotiations is considerably more effective than employing debt collection agencies. His methods are successful, and Lao is not called a public relations specialist without reason," characterized Mõis.

== New conflicts ==
In 2005, Meelis Lao faced charges of trespassing when, at a McDonald's restaurant on Viru Street, he intervened in a dispute between tenants and owners (represented by OÜ Tartelone, represented by Janar Stint, and Fixor Invest) over a lease agreement for commercial premises at Valli 2/Viru 24/Müürivahe 38. Referring to the property owners' wishes, he prevented the opening of McDonald's and did not allow its employees into the establishment. However, he escaped charges of trespassing because, according to the law changed in the spring of 2007, trespassing is not considered a crime if no violence or threats are involved.

In 2008, Lao and the company ML Investments Group were convicted of a tax crime, where the Tax and Customs Board identified a 6.9 million kroon tax fraud in 2007, attempting to deceive the state with fictitious invoices. One part of the ML Investments Group invoiced the company for transactions that did not actually take place. To improve the company's financial situation, Lao borrowed from Gild Arbitrage at an interest rate of 50%. However, according to the annual report of the venture capital fund, the money has not been repaid, and the fund has assessed the loan value to be less than 8.9 million by the end of the previous year.

In 2009, Lao was again charged and taken to court for a severe breach of public order with violence near the BonBon nightclub in Tallinn during the spring. In January 2010, Harju County Court imposed a monetary fine of 21,315 kroons on Lao for the offense. The convicting decision of the county court was annulled by the Tallinn Circuit Court on April 12, and the acquitting decision of the circuit court was annulled by the Supreme Court at the end of August. On November 23, 2010, the Tallinn Circuit Court acquitted Lao of the charge of "severe breach of public order.

In 2019, Meelis Lao, accused of aiding in unlawful deprivation of liberty, reached an agreement with the State Prosecutor's Office. Based on the punishment agreement approved by Harju County Court, the court substituted an eight-month prison sentence with 238 hours of community service. According to the State Prosecutor's Office's charges, the accused, Siim Kossar, Mark Raul Laanela, and Viktor Tiuliukov, detained a 42-year-old man in November 2017. The victim was repeatedly beaten, threatened, and subjected to physical abuse of himself and his family, demanding a payment of one million euros. Siim Kossar was specifically charged with unlawful deprivation of liberty, and Meelis Lao was charged with aiding in this act. Mark Raul and Viktor were charged with extortion committed in a group, on a large scale, and involving deprivation of liberty. Viktor was also accused of armed robbery.

In December 2020, the State Prosecutor's Office brought a criminal case to court, accusing Meelis Lao and three other men of illegal handling of firearms and ammunition, as well as arson of a vehicle.

== Personal life ==
Meelis Lao has studied social work at the University of Tartu.

Lao is a former Estonian junior karate champion and won the bronze medal in heavyweight boxing at the Estonian boxing championships.

Lao is divorced (from his ex-wife Ave) and has three children.

== Memoir ==
In November 2023, Meelis released his first book "The Eastern Godfather". In the memoir, Lao tells his story on the roller-coaster ride through the collapse of the Soviet Union and his rise to power.
