= GE PowerHaul =

Locomotive

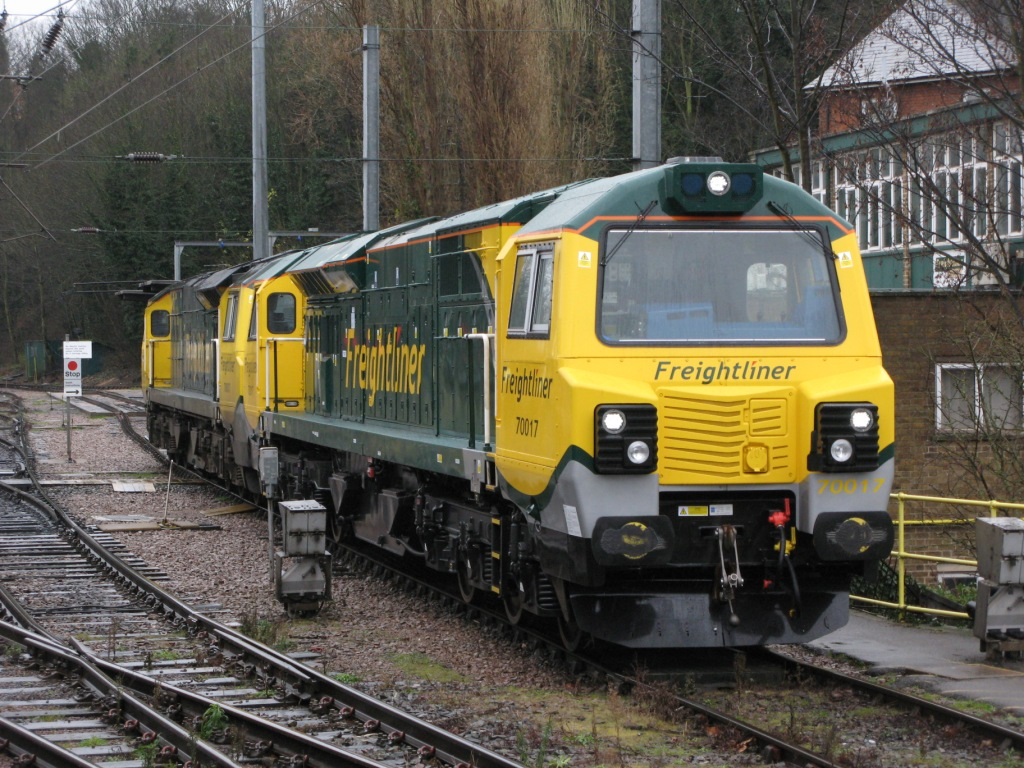
- Freightliner 70017 & 70007 at Ipswich in 2012
Type and origin
- Power type: Diesel-electric
Specifications
- Length: PH37ACmi: 21.710 m (71 ft 2.7 in); PH 37ACi: 21.7 m (71 ft 2.3 in); PH37ACmai:
- Width: PH37ACmi: 2.642 m (8 ft 8.02 in); PH 37ACi: 2.9 m (9 ft 6.17 in); PH37ACmai:
- Height: PH37ACmi: 3.917 m (12 ft 10.21 in); PH 37ACi: 4.3 m (14 ft 1.29 in); PH37ACmai:
- Loco weight: PH37ACmi: 129 t (127 long tons; 142 short tons); PH 37ACi (L6_{20} axle class): 120 to 126 t (118 to 124 long tons; 132 to 139 short tons); PH 37Aci (L6_{21} axle class): 126–132 t (124–130 long tons; 139–146 short tons); PH37ACmai:
- Fuel capacity: PH37ACmi: 6,000 L (1,300 imp gal; 1,600 US gal); PH 37ACi: 9,000 L (2,000 imp gal; 2,400 US gal); PH37ACmai:
- Prime mover: GE PowerHaul P616 2,750 kW (3,700 hp) @ 1500 rpm
- Engine type: V16 engine, four stroke
- Loco brake: Dynamic
Performance figures
- Tractive effort: Starting: PH37ACmi: 534 kN (120,000 lb_{f}); PH 37ACi: 450 kN (100,000 lb_{f}) or 544 kN (122,000 lb_{f}); PH37ACmai:
- Sources: except where noted

The GE PowerHaul is a class of mainline diesel-electric locomotives designed by General Electric. Thirty locomotives were ordered by Freightliner in 2007; the first locomotive was completed in July 2009 at GE's Erie, Pennsylvania, plant.

The Turkish state owned rolling stock manufacturer Tülomsaş has a manufacturing agreement with GE to produce PowerHaul locomotives for European, African and Middle-Eastern markets. The Tülomsaş plant produced its first PowerHaul locomotive in February 2011. In November 2011 Australian engineering firm UGL Rail announced it was to develop a narrow gauge version of the class in association with GE.

Three main subclasses exist: PH37ACmi for UK railways, PH37ACi a version for mainland Europe and elsewhere built to UIC 505-1 vehicle gauge, and PH37ACmai a version for 3 ft 6 in (1,067 mm) gauge lines.

Versions of the locomotive include the Class 70 used by Freightliner (UK), the DE36000 of the Turkish State Railways and the Korail Class 7600 (South Korea).

== History and design ==
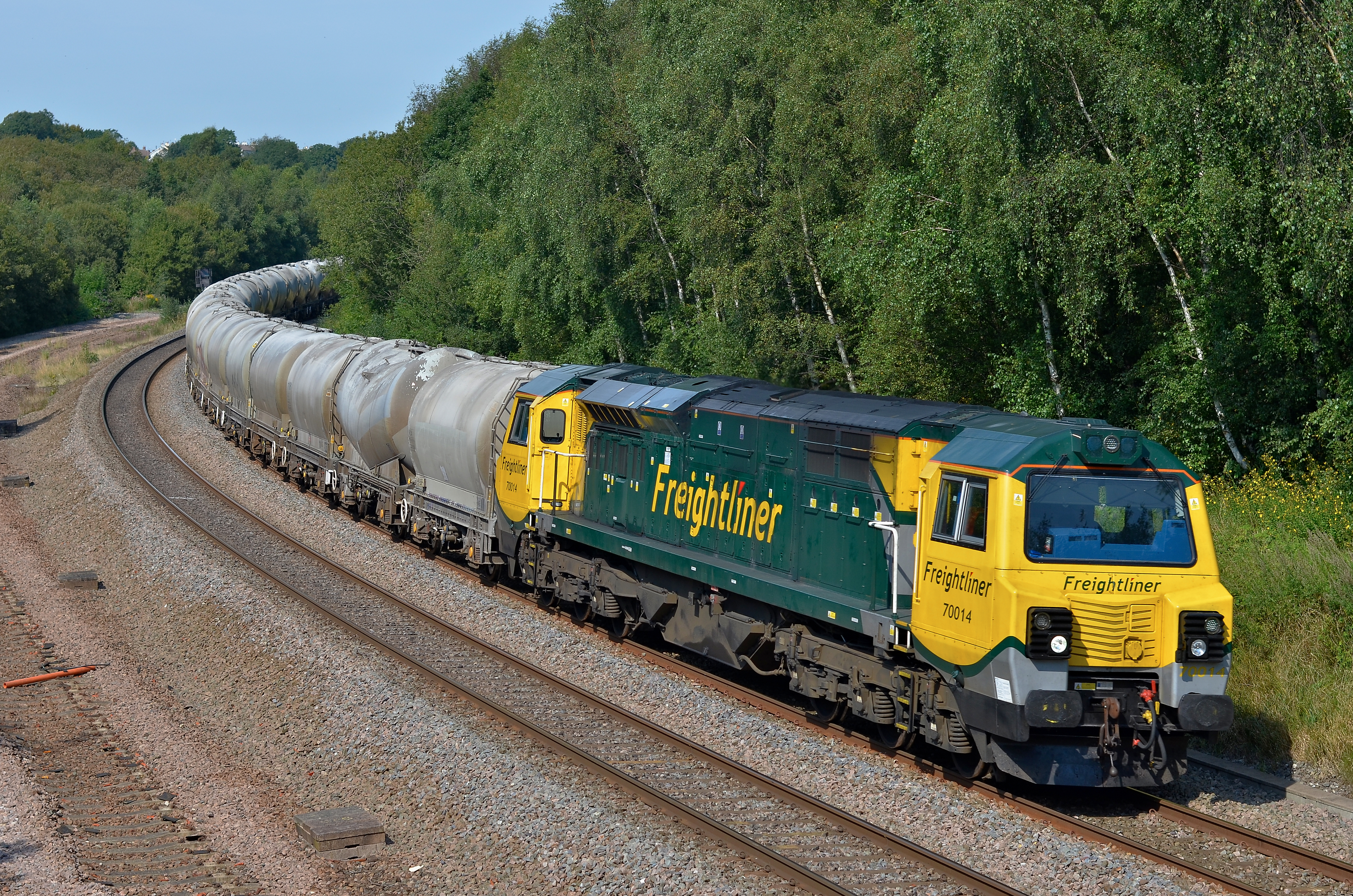
Freightliner 70014 at North Wingfield in 2012

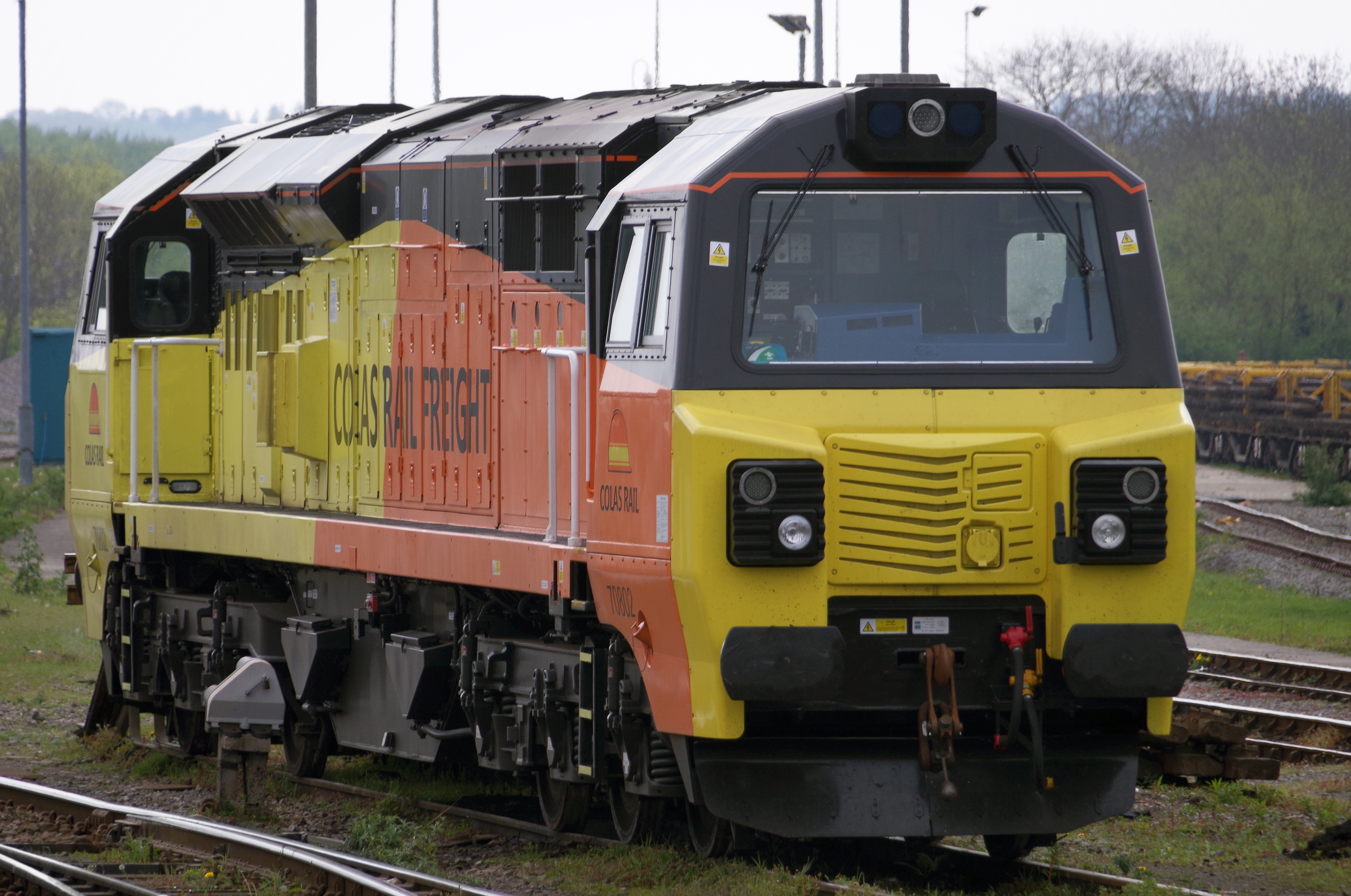
Colas Rail 70805 at Westbury in 2014

The PowerHaul Class are a 6 axle Co-Co design for heavy mainline freight operations - the design originated in a collaboration between Freightliner who required a more powerful freight locomotive, and General Electric who needed a launch customer for its entry into the European rolling stock market. The locomotives are the first GE locomotives manufactured for the European market since the Blue Tiger locomotive built in collaboration with AdTranz.

To fit within European and UK mass and loading gauge restrictions GE used a relatively high revving engine (1500rpm), (Note: The contemporary GEVO V12 used in its North American GE Evolution Series operates at a maximum 1050rpm, the EMD 710 at a maximum 900rpm.) giving a 20% increase in power-weight ratio. The engine uses the same design of transmission system as used in GE's North American AC drive locomotives: an AC alternator, with AC output rectified to an intermediate DC line, with separate inverters and inverter control for each traction motor, auxiliary power is also supplied by the DC link, using electronic inverter based load control. The PM37ACmi design uses a General Electric GTA series alternator, and 5GEB30 axle hung traction motors.

The cab includes heating, air conditioning, and acoustic insulation; the driving controls are 'dial-less' - information is displayed using electronic panel displays. The cab design includes consideration for GSM-R and European Rail Traffic Management System. One innovative feature of the design was the use of electrical power generated when using dynamic braking to supply auxiliary power - resulting in increase in overall efficiency.

Freightliner placed an order for 30 units (originally designated JS37ACi) in November 2007. The first two locomotives manufactured were for Freightliner in the United Kingdom, construction began in May 2009 in Erie, with much of the UK compatibility testing taking place in the US before shipping to the UK. Two locomotives were delivered to the UK in October 2009, and received permission for service use by December 2009.

In December 2008 GE Transportation reached a manufacturing agreement with Tülomsas for the production of future PowerHaul locomotives for Eurasian, and African markets; the initial contract was reported to be for production of 50 units, 30 for GE and 20 for TCDD. In February 2011 Tülomsas completed the assembly of its first PowerHaul from a kit manufactured at GE's Erie plant; the locomotive, built to a UK loading gauge was shipped to the United Kingdom in October 2012.

In April 2012 GE announced that it was to use a PowerHaul locomotive to test its "Tempo" European Rail Traffic Management System system (Level 1 & 2). The locomotive is to be a Tülomsas built unit operated by an unnamed open access operator in Belgium, Netherlands, France, Germany and Switzerland, with operations starting 2013. In September 2012 GE announced that freight operator Heavy Haul Power International (HHPI) would be the recipient of two to six locomotives, which would be used to obtain homologation certification.

=== Engine ===
PowerHaul locomotives use a PowerHaul P616 diesel engine; based on the Jenbacher J616 gas engine. (Note: GE Energy acquired the Austrian Jenbacher company in 2003, initially the engine was designed for stationery power applications.) The 16 cylinder 4 stroke engine uses the Miller cycle, which GE claims increases fuel efficiency over conventional 4 stroke engines, as well as reducing emissions. Rated power is 3,700 hp (2,800 kW) with an engine speed of 1500rpm; the engine meets EU stage IIIa emission standards.

General Electric claims that the engine is more fuel efficient than contemporary competitors, (Note: Compared to CAT C175, MTU 4000 and EMD 710 series engines) consuming 192g per kilowatt hour at full power output. EU IIIb emission standards are said to be achievable using exhaust gas recirculation and exhaust gas after-treatment by diesel oxidation catalyst.

== Sub-types ==
=== PH37ACmi ===
The subtype PH37ACmi was originally built for Freightliner with the TOPS designation given Class 70. The design is built to vehicle gauge defined by drawing 'UK L-A1-1806', (Note: "UK L-A1-1806" refers to a locomotive gauge drawing produced by the BR CM&EE Dept. (British Rail Chief Mechanical and Electrical Engineer's Department) in 1970 version L-A1-1806. Superseded within Railway Group Standard GE/RT8073.) with a mass of 129 tonnes, Route Availability of RA7, fuel tank capacity of 6,000 L (1,300 imp gal; 1,600 US gal) and starting tractive effort of 544 kN (122,000 lb_{f}). The locomotives have a hood unit design, with two cabs.

=== PH37ACi ===
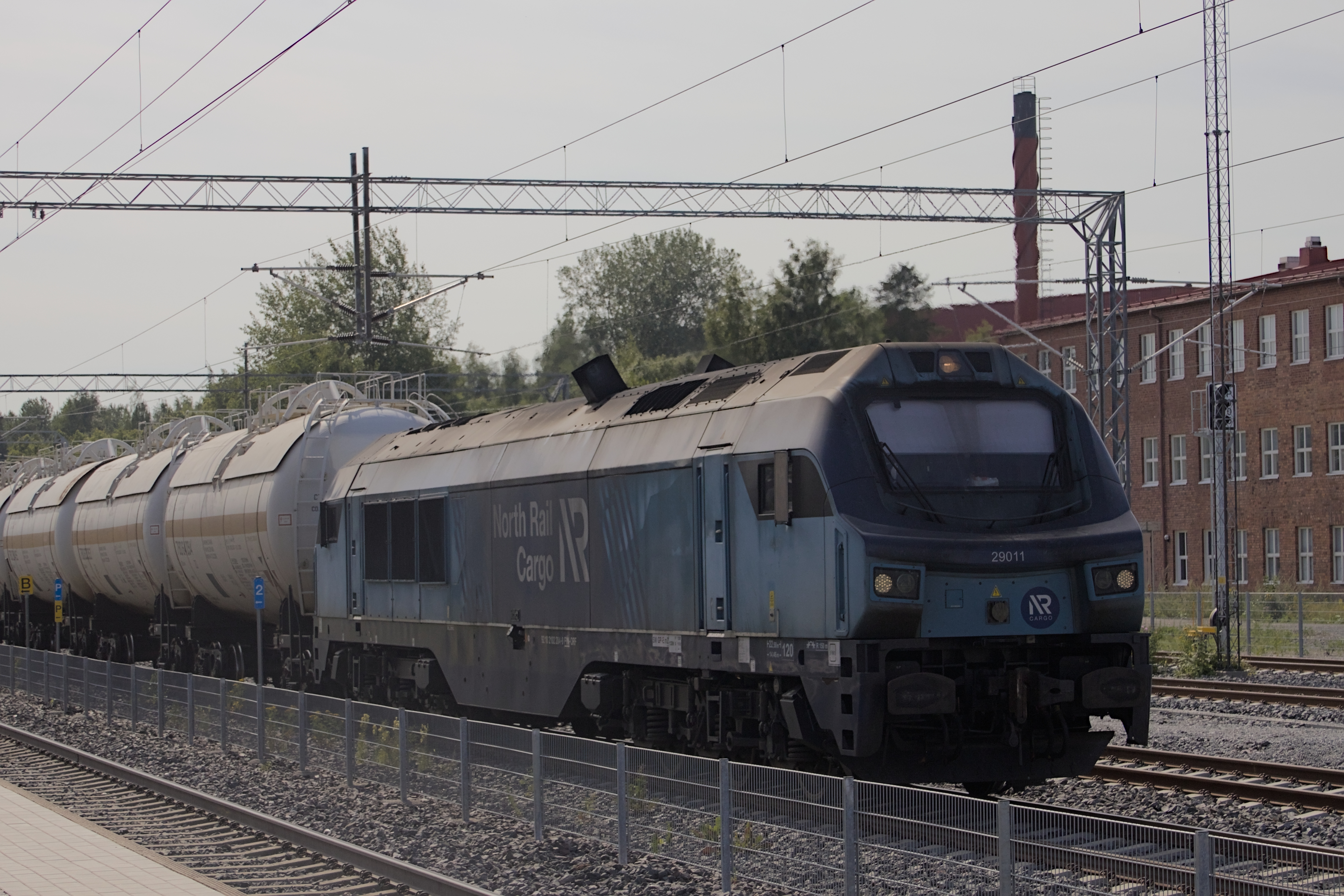
North Rail Dr20 29011 (PH37ACai) at Nokia in 2026

A subtype PH37Aci has been designed to be built to fit within the UIC 505-1 vehicle gauge. Unlike the original version built for the UK loading gauge, the design has a full-width body. There are two versions of the design, one with a 20 t (19.7 long tons; 22.0 short tons) axle load and 450 kN (100,000 lb_{f}) starting tractive effort intended for European railways, and a 21 t (20.7 long tons; 23.1 short tons) axleload version with more powerful traction motors and starting tractive effort of 544 kN (122,000 lb_{f}). The versions have axleload class L6_{20} and L6_{21} as defined by European Standard EN 15528 (2008). (Note: EN 25528:2008 Railway applications - Line categories for managing the interface between load limits of vehicles and infrastructure, Appendix K)

Unlike PH37ACmi the locomotives are expected to be built to a cowl unit external design, with dimensions of 21.7 m (71 ft 2.3 in) long, width 2.9 m (9 ft 6.17 in), and height 4.3 m (14 ft 1.29 in). The locomotives retain a twin cab design. Fuel tank capacity is 9,000 L (2,000 imp gal; 2,400 US gal), with 3,490 hp (2,600 kW) available for traction, and a braking force of 270 kN (61,000 lb_{f}) maximum. The European version is expected to be re-designed to meet 'European Driver Desk' recommendations, and UIC 612 standards, with a central driving position. The L6_{20} version is expected to have a redesigned bogie. The track gauge for the PH37ACi can be from 1,435 mm (4 ft 8 1/2 in) to 1,668 mm (5 ft 5 21/32 in).

Kits for the new design were expected to be shipped to Tülomsaş (Turkey) in early 2012. A Tulomsas assembled locomotive in Heavy Haul International branding was exhibited at Innotrans trade fair in September 2012.

European freight operator Heavy Haul Power International took a delivery of pilot production 9 Powerhaul locomotives assembled at Tulomsas. They were stored in Cottbus, Germany for several years as their buyer had no use for them. In 2020 stored PH37ACai locomotives were returned to Turkey for conversion from 1435 mm gauge to 1524 mm gauge for operations in Finland. They were also equipped with Finnish JKV train protection system and Russian standard SA3 couplers. Locomotives were delivered for Finnish operator North Rail (then Operail Finland) in 2020. Finnish locomotive registry designation for PH37ACai is Dr20 (D = diesel, r = raskas (heavy), type 20). Units have been used for goods traffic from Russia to Finland.

=== PH37ACmai ===
In November 2011 GE and UGL Rail announced that it would build two prototype UGL Rail PH37ACmai 1,067 mm (3 ft 6 in) gauge PowerHaul locomotives. They were intended for use on the narrow gauge networks in Queensland and Western Australia. GE supplied the power and traction package, with UGL constructing the locomotive frame, with some components sourced from India. The first of three prototypes was nearing completion at its Broadmeadow factory in January 2014. They were sold to Pacific National in 2016 for use in Queensland.

== Production and operators ==
Type	Operator	Operator class	Number	Date	Notes
PH37ACmi	Freightliner	Class 70/0	19	2007 (order)	30 units ordered via Lloyds TSB Leasing for Freightliner. Initial 20 of ordered delivered to Freightliner. One unit (70 012) damaged in unloading and returned to the United States.
PH37ACmi	TCDD / Colas Rail	TCDD DE37000 / BR Class 70/8	1	2011 (built)	Assembled in Turkey by Tülomsaş as demonstrator. Initially numbered as TCDD 37001. Shipped to UK in 2012, renumbered 70 099. Acquired by Colas in 2013, renumbered 70 801.
PH37ACmi	Colas Rail	Class 70/8	10	2013 (order)	Colas Rail order for 10 units made in 2013. Order made up from remainder of 2007 order of 30 for Lloyds leasing was taken up by Colas in 2013. First Colas unit 70 801 is former TCDD demonstrator.
PH37ACmi	Colas Rail	Class 70/8	7	2015 (order)	Colas Rail order for 7 units made in 2015.
PH37ACai	North Rail (formerly Operail Finland)	Dr20	9	2012 (launch)	Converted to 1524 mm gauge and ATP-VR/RHK installed. Launch customer Heavy Haul Power International GmbH (HHPI), for European mainland. Unveiled at Innotrans 2012. Initially used for European certification in Germany, and Benelux.
PH37ACi	TCDD	TCDD DE 36000	20	2013 (order)	20 units ordered for Turkish State Railways (TCDD) as part of an order of 50 to be assembled by Tulomsas. Production of locomotives during 2014-.
PH37ACi			30	2013 (order)	Units to be assembled for unspecified "'regional export markets' in Europe, the Middle East and North Africa.
PH37ACi	Korail	Korail Class 7600	25	2014	Locomotives ordered by Korail in 2011 and being built in association with Hyundai Rotem for use on passenger and freight services from 2014. Operating speed up to 150 km/h. see also 한국철도공사 7600호대 디젤 기관차 (Korail Class 7600)
PH37ACmai	Pacific National	PH	3	2014	3 prototype 1,067 mm (3 ft 6 in) demonstrators built by UGL Rail, Australia
PH37ACi	Körfez Ulaştırma		5	2019	Assembled by Tülomsaş

== See also ==
- EMD Class 66
- Stadler Euro
- Voith Maxima
