= Meelis =

1941 novel by Enn Kippel

- Cover of 1961 published version.
- Language: Estonian
- Publication place: Estonia

Meelis is a historical novel by Estonian author Enn Kippel. It was first published in 1941.

It talks about the adventures of a boy called Meelis, the son of Sakala's elder Lembitu.
