= Lilli Promet =

Estonian writer (1922–2007)

Lilli Promet (16 February 1922 – 16 February 2007) was an Estonian author.

== Life ==
Promet was born in Petseri (now Pechory, Russia) to the Estonian painter Aleksander Promet. After graduating from Tallinn Primary School No. 18, she entered the State Industrial Art School in 1935, from which she graduated in spring 1940. In autumn, she was asked to work at the newspaper Noorte Hääl. After the outbreak of World War II, she and her family were forced to leave their home and evacuated to Tatarstan. In summer 1943, Promet went to work at Estonian-language radio in blockaded Leningrad. From 1944 to 1951, she worked as a journalist in Tallinn.

Promet died on her 85th birthday in Tallinn. She is buried at Metsakalmistu Cemetery in Tallinn.

She was married to the writer Ralf Parve (1919–2011). Their son Ralf R. Parve (1946–2008) was a journalist and politician.

== Filmography ==
- Roosa kübar (1963)
- Tütarlaps mustas (1966)
- Pimedad aknad (1968)

== Books ==
The following is a partial list of works published by Lilli Promet

- Roosa kübar (1961)
- Meesteta küla (1962, novel)
- Lamav tiiger (1964)
- Kes levitab anekdoote? (1967)
- Iibelpuu (1970)
- Primavera (1971, novel)
- Raamita pildid (1976, essays)
- A Summer's Painting and Other Stories (1984)
- Õhtusel alleel (1989)
- Iisabel: Romaan (1992)
- Aheldatud muusa (1997)
