= GE Dash 7 Series =

Series of diesel–electric locomotives (1976–1988)

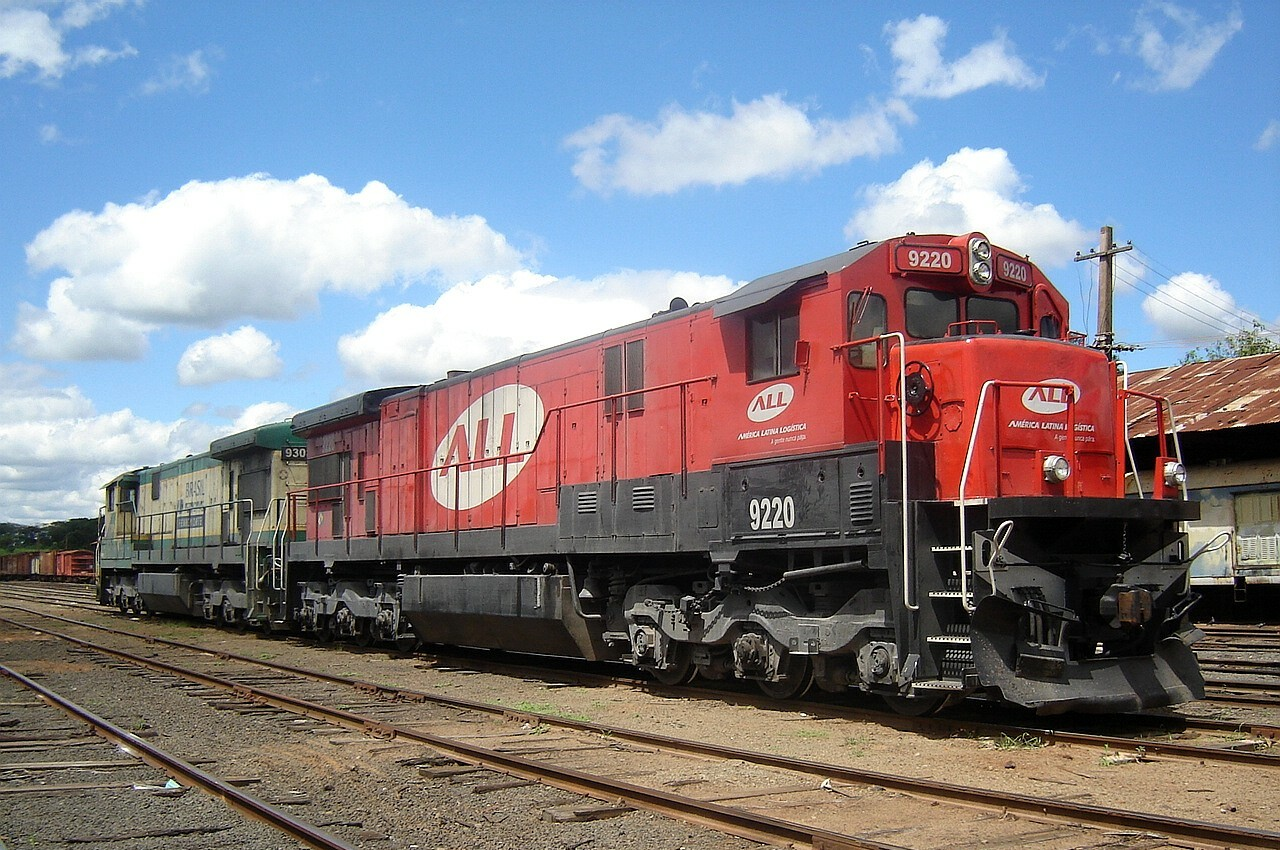
- ALL GE C30-7 #9220, at Triagem Paulista, Bauru-SP, Brazil.
Type and origin
- Power type: Diesel–electric
- Builder: GE Transportation
Specifications
- Configuration
  - AAR: B-B (B23-7, BQ23-7, B30-7, B30-7A, B36-7); C-C (CM22-7i, C30-7, C30-7A, C36-7)
- Gauge: 1,435 mm (4 ft 8 1/2 in) Standard gauge 1,000 mm (3 ft 3 3/8 in) Meter gauge 1,520 mm (4 ft 11 27/32 in) Russian gauge
- Length: 61 ft 2 in (18.64 m) (B23-7); 63 ft 6 in (19.35 m) (CM22-7i); 67 ft 3 in (20.50 m) (C30-7)
- Fuel capacity: 2,100 US gal (7,950 L; 1,750 imp gal) (B23-7); 4,540 L (999 imp gal; 1,200 U.S. gal) (CM22-7i); 3,000 US gal (11,400 L; 2,500 imp gal) (C30-7)
- Prime mover: GE 7FDL, Cummins KTA50-L (CM22-7i, State Railway of Thailand)
- Engine type: 4-stroke diesel engine
- Aspiration: Turbocharged
- Cylinders: V12 or V16
Performance figures
- Power output: 2,300 hp (1,720 kW) (B23-7, BQ23-7); 2,500 hp (1,860 kW) (CM22-7i); 3,000 hp (2,240 kW) (B30-7, B30-7A, C30-7, C30-7A); 3,600 hp (2,680 kW) (B36-7, C36-7)
Career
- Operators: Various
- Nicknames: 'B-Boat', 'C-Boat', 'Wheelchair'(Brazil)
- Locale: North America, Brazil, Estonia, China, Thailand
- Disposition: Most retired from service, some in service with national or regional and short line railroads.

The Dash 7 Series is a family of diesel–electric freight locomotive models built by GE Transportation. Introduced in the mid-1970s, it replaced the Universal Series and was later superseded by the Dash 8 Series in the mid-1980s.

== Specifications ==
All models of the Dash 7 Series are powered by a 12-cylinder or 16-cylinder, turbocharged, GE 7FDL four-stroke diesel engine carried over from the Universal Series, and have speed-based adhesion control with a multi-channel LED annunciator panel. This, however, is not the case for the State Railway of Thailand's GE CM22-7i, which uses two Cummins KTA50-L diesel engines.

Dash 7 Series traction motors are powered by direct current.

== Construction history ==
The Dash 7's predecessor, the Universal Series, had been introduced in the 1950s, and with its innovative body structure, it had initially been greeted favourably by the market. However, GM-EMD had then developed the GP30 model to compete with it; GP30 production had commenced in 1961. Over many years, the GP30's reliability had given it a sales advantage, and when EMD introduced its successor, the Dash 2, in 1972, the Universal Series became completely obsolete. The Dash 7 Series was intended to redress the ensuing imbalance between the two competing manufacturers.

GE commenced production of the Dash 7 Series in 1976. By the time Dash 7 production ceased in 1985, about 2,800 Dash 7 locomotives had been built - roughly the same number of units as the total production of the Universal Series. By contrast, EMD built more than 8,000 Dash 2 locomotives.

Although the Dash 7 Series failed to surpass the Dash 2 in terms of market share, its 4-stroke engine returned better fuel consumption figures than the 2-stroke engine fitted to GM-EMD locomotives after the 1970s oil crisis. The Dash 7 Series was therefore positively received.

== Nomenclature ==
The naming of the Dash 7 Series, and that of its various models, is based upon wheel arrangement and power output. So, for example, "B30-7" designates a B-B configured 3,000 hp (2,240 kW) Dash 7 Series locomotive.

== Four axle models ==
=== Common features ===
Specifications common to all Dash 7 Series four axle models are as follows:

- AAR wheel arrangement: B-B
- Prime mover: GE 12-cylinder V-type 7FDL12 or 16-cylinder V-type 7FDL16 four stroke diesel engine

=== B23-7 ===
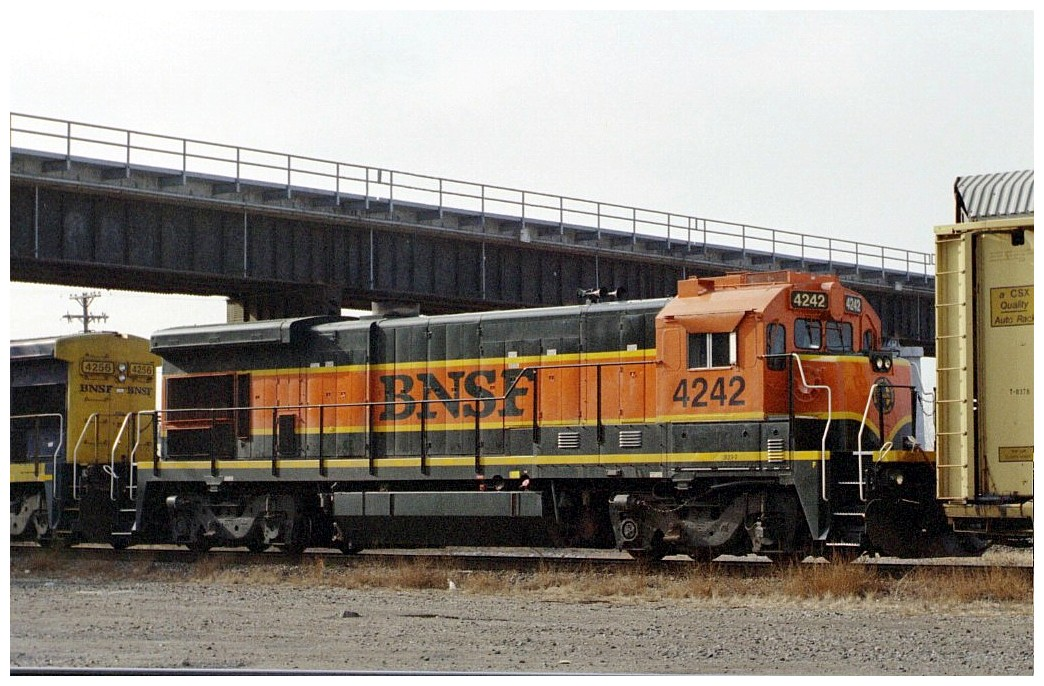
A BNSF B23-7

This model was manufactured between 1977 and 1984 and was fitted with a 12-cylinder 7FDL12 engine.

It replaced GE's U23B, and competed with the very successful EMD GP38-2.

A total of 537 B23-7s were built for 9 U.S. customers and 2 Mexican customers.

Southern Railway's 54 units had Southern's "standard" high-short-hoods.

These engines are frequently rebuilt as a Control Car Remote Control Locomotive (CCRCL), due to their low value on the used locomotive market.

- Power output: 2,250 hp (1,680 kW)

=== BQ23-7 ===
The BQ23-7 model was a variant of the B23-7 built between 1978 and 1979.

It was mechanically identical to the B23-7.

The 'Q' in the model designation stood for "crew Quarters", and referred to the model's enlarged operating cab for accommodating the train crew.

Only ten were built, all for the Seaboard Coast Line railroad. They were nicknamed "Busses" by the operating crews and "Aegis Cruisers" by some railfans, due to their boxy shape.

- Power output: 2,250 hp (1,680 kW)

=== B30-7 ===
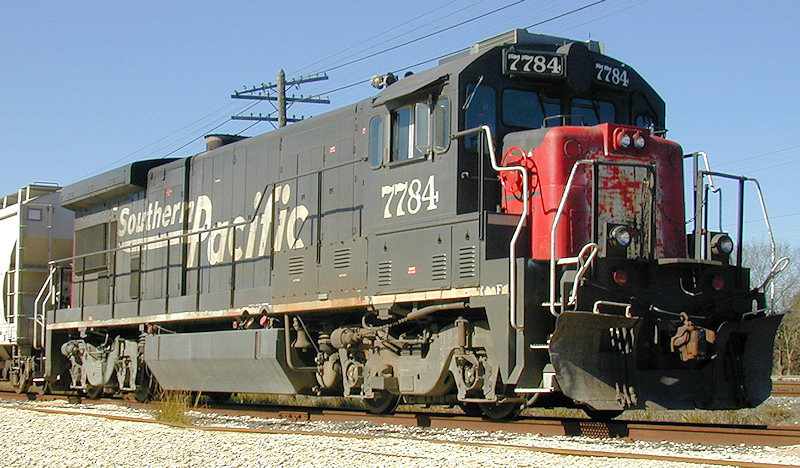
A Southern Pacific B30-7

The B30-7 was of similar length to the B23-7, but was equipped with a more powerful 16-cylinder 7FDL16 engine. It replaced the U30B model.

Between December 1977 and May 1982, a total of 279 units of the B30-7 model were produced.

These production numbers include the three different B30-7A variants described below.

All of the B30-7s were built for U.S. customers.

- Power output: 3,000 hp (2,240 kW)

=== B30-7A ===
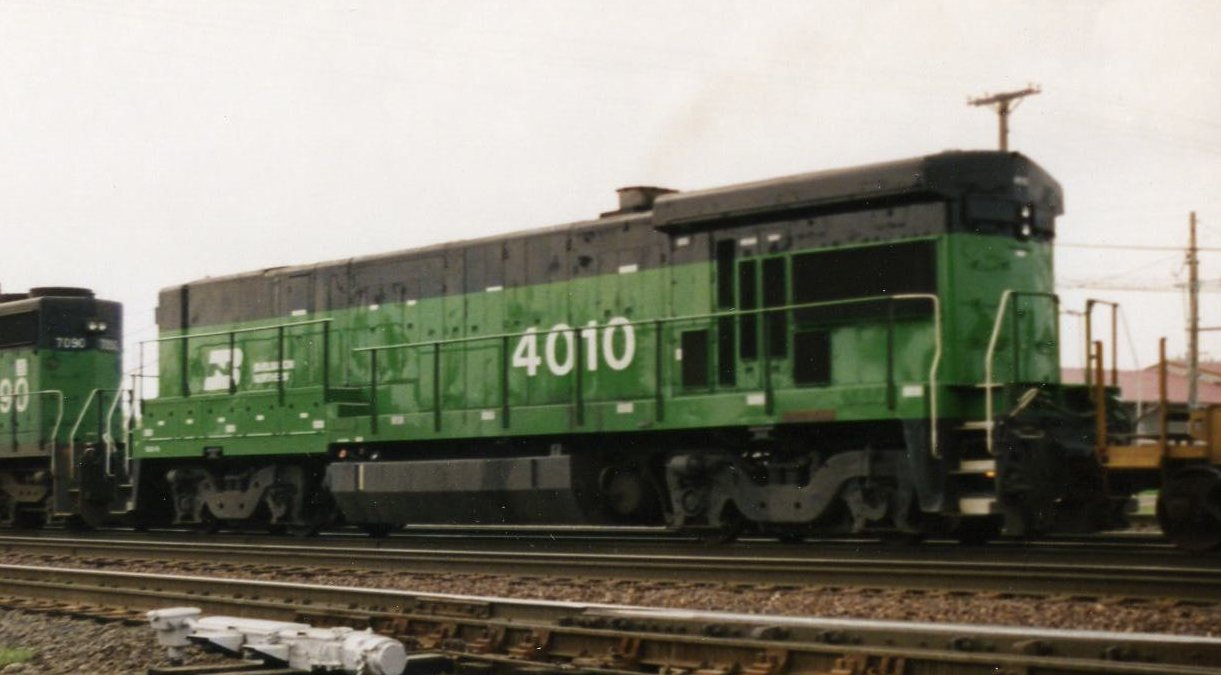
A Burlington Northern B30-7A

This model was a variant of the B30-7 fitted with a 12-cylinder 7FDL12 engine generating the same power output as the B30-7.

Three different versions of the B30-7A variant were produced.

B30-7As were built only for the Missouri Pacific Railroad and are externally identical to the 16 cylinder B30-7.

Cabless B30-7As were built only for the Burlington Northern Railroad.

B30-7A1s were built only for the Southern Railway.

- Power output: 3,000 hp (2,240 kW)

=== B36-7 ===
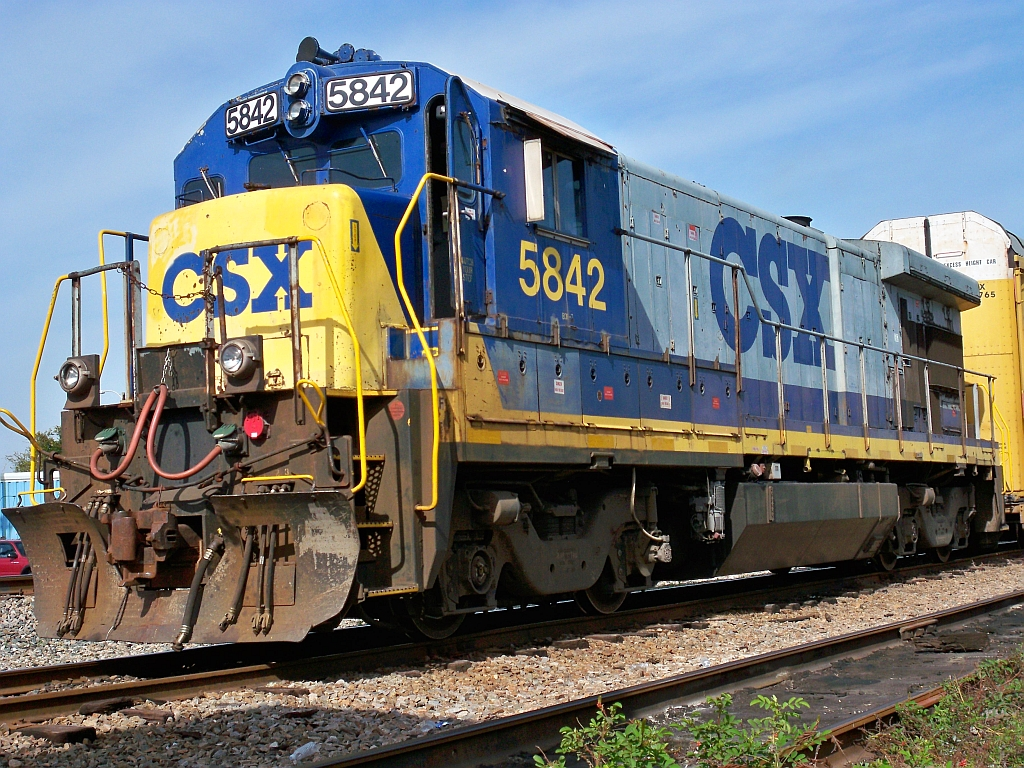
A CSX B36-7

The B36-7 model was manufactured between 1980 and 1985, and was fitted with a 16-cylinder 7FDL16 engine.

The model was designed as a successor to the U36B.

A total of 222 B36-7's were built for North American railroads, and a further eight units were delivered to a Columbian coal mining operation.

The largest customer for the model was Seaboard System, which became part of CSX Transportation in 1986.

Seaboard System took delivery of 120 B36-7s; the model's second biggest customer, Conrail, acquired 60 units.

- Power output: 3,600 hp (2,680 kW)

== Six axle models ==
=== Common features ===
Specifications common to all Dash 7 Series six axle models are as follows:

- AAR wheel arrangement: C-C
- Prime mover: GE 12-cylinder V-type 7FDL12 or 16-cylinder V-type 7FDL16 four stroke diesel engines with the exception of State Railway of Thailand's CM22-7i using two Cummins KTA50-L engines.

=== CM22-7i ===
SRT GEA Class Locomotive (Thai Wikipedia Article)

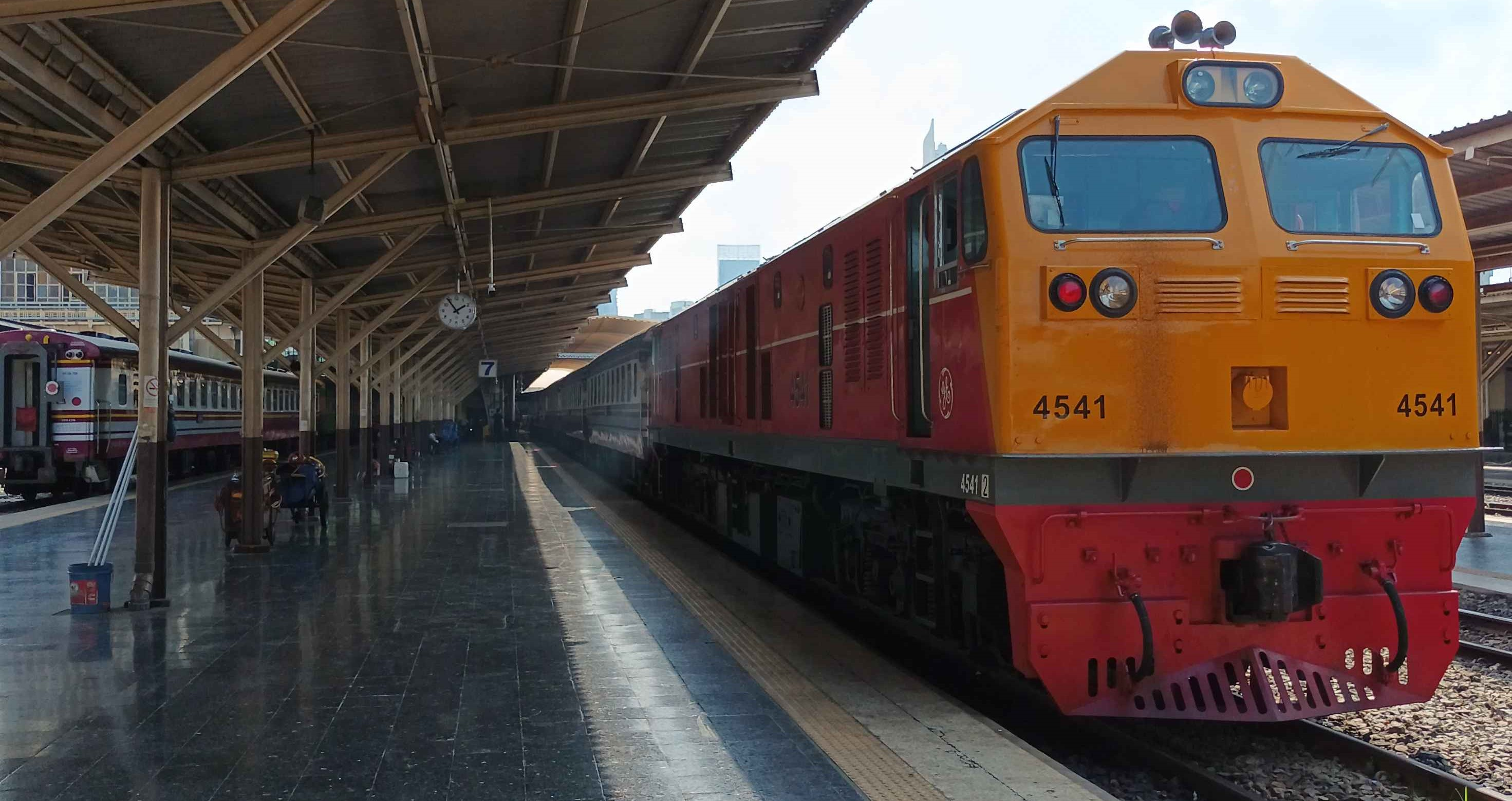
A CM22-7i in Thailand

The CM22-7i model was manufactured in 1995 and was fitted with two Cummins KTA50-L engines, which was a similar configuration to the existing HID class locomotive (Hitachi 8FA-36C) in the State Railway of Thailand. It is known in Thailand as the GEA class locomotive and is numbered from 4523 to 4560.

A total of 38 CM22-7is were built, all of them for Thai railroads. They were used in mixed-use conditions from freight hauling to passenger locomotives as commuter trains, ordinary trains, rapid trains, or express trains in Thailand.

- Power output: 2,500 hp (1,860 kW), which was a combination of two 1,250 hp (932 kW) Cummins KTA50-L prime movers' horsepower.
- It is a meter gauge locomotive.

=== C30-7 ===
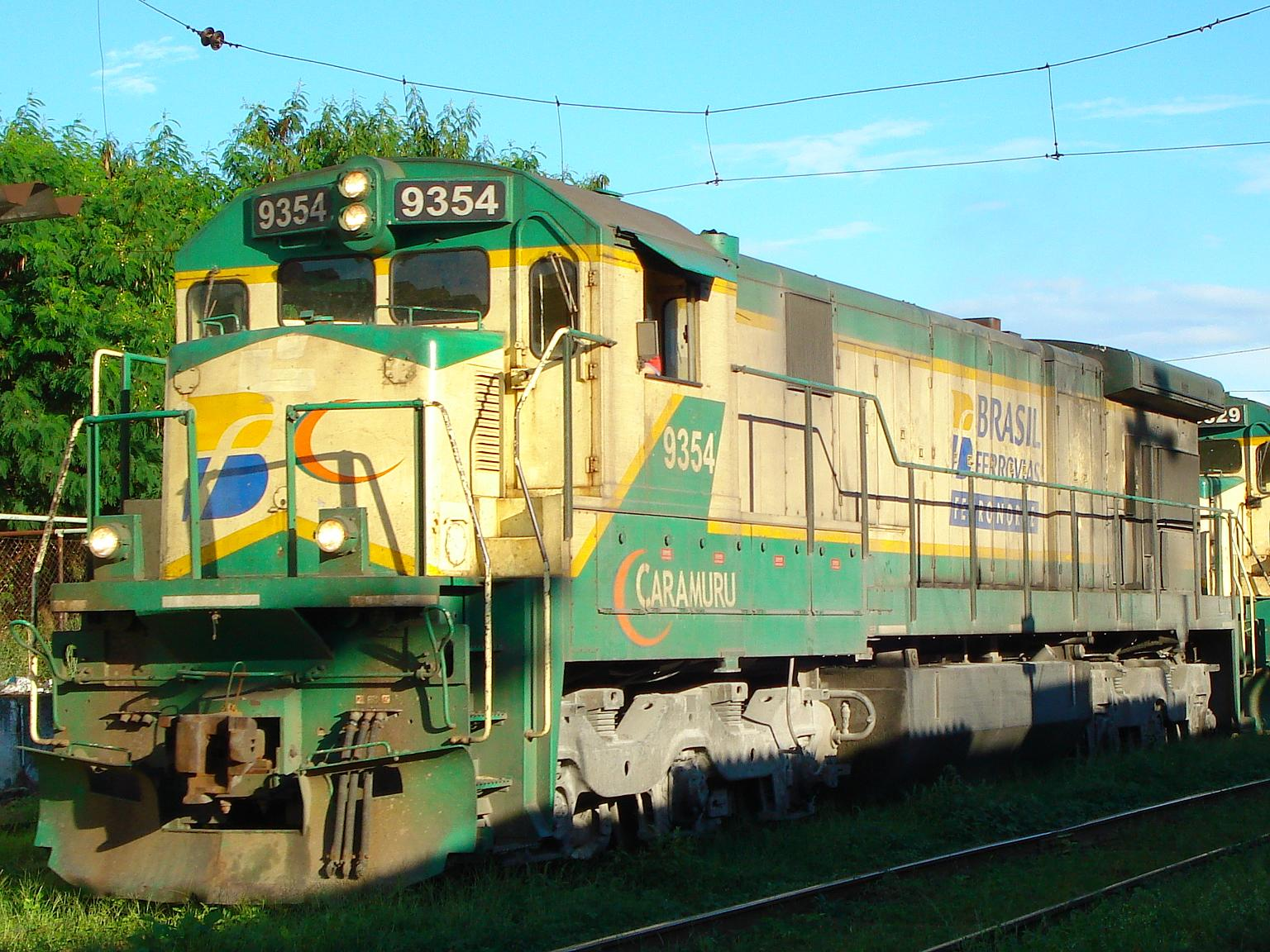
A C30-7 in Brazil

The C30-7 model was manufactured between 1976 and 1986 and was fitted with a 16-cylinder 7FDL engine.

It replaced the U30C model.

A total of 1,137 C30-7s were built, all of them for North American railroads.

These production numbers include the 50 C30-7A variants described below.

Approximately half of the C30-7s have since been exported to Brazil after being sold by their original owners.

- Power output: 3,000 hp (2,240 kW)

=== C30-7A ===
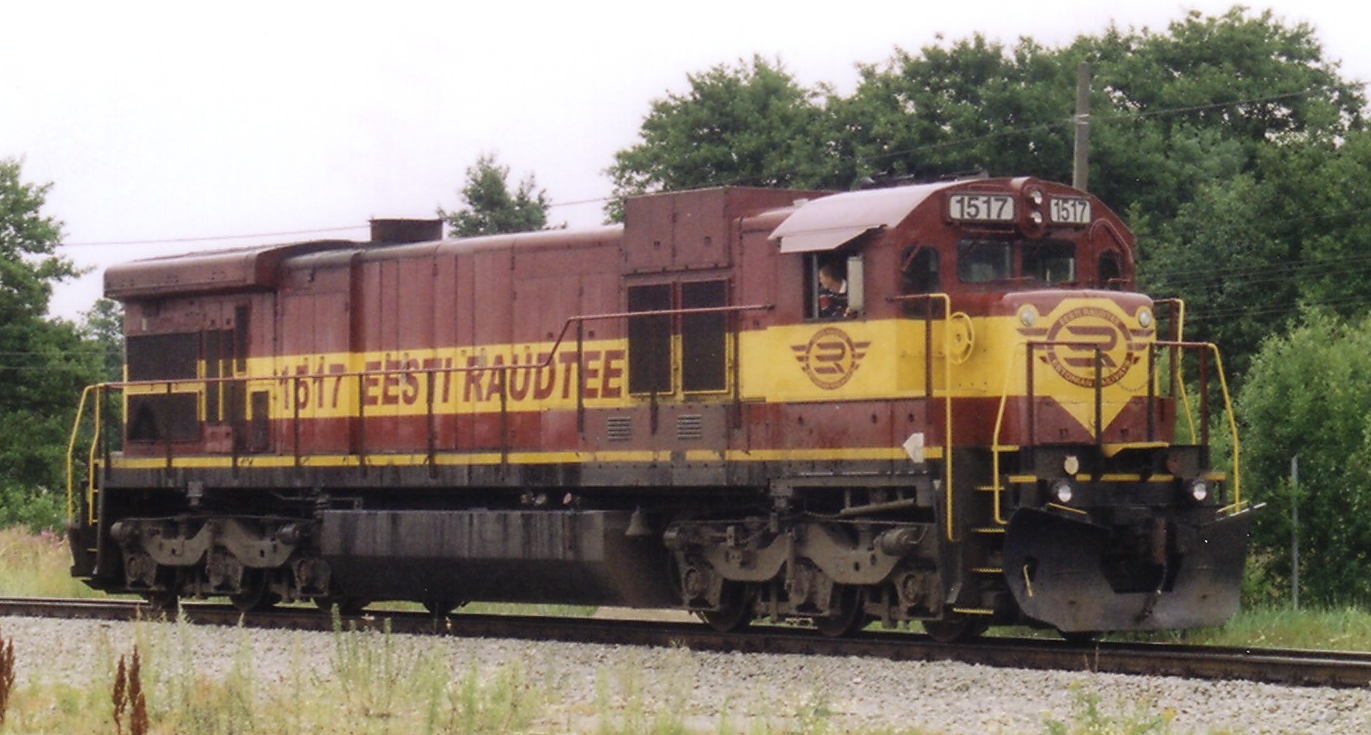
A C36-7i in Estonia

This model was a variant of the C30-7 fitted with a 12-cylinder 7FDL12 engine generating the same power output as the B30-7.

The smaller engine used less fuel than the 16-cylinder version.

A total of 50 C30-7As were built in mid-1984, and delivered to Conrail.

They are externally similar to the C30-7, except that they have six tall hood doors per side (in place of eight) and moved front grilles on long hood, also only 4 steps.

In 2003, nineteen C30-7As were rebuilt and exported to Estonia as C30-7Ais.

- Power output: 3,000 hp (2,240 kW)

=== C36-7 ===
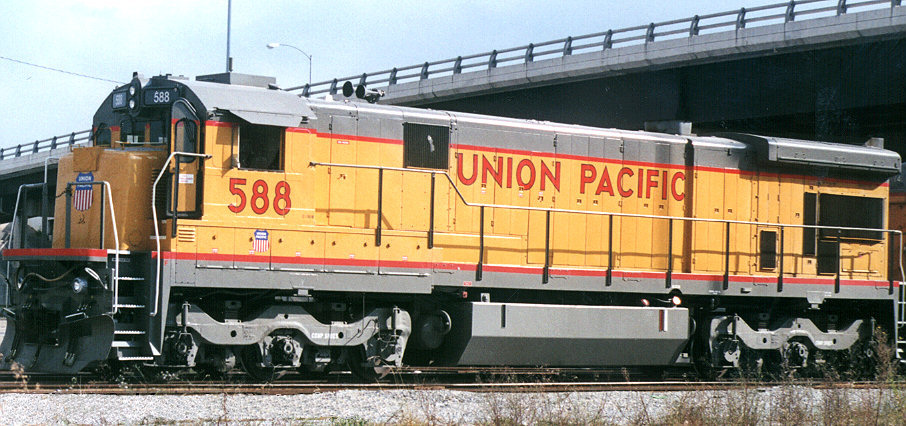
A Union Pacific C30-7

The C36-7 model was manufactured between 1978 and 1989, and was fitted with a 16-cylinder 7FDL16 engine.

Most were made in the United States, but GE do Brasil built 15 C36-7s for Ferrocarriles Nacionales de México.

A total of 599 units of the model were built; 422 of them were exported to the People's Republic of China, which designated it ND5.

The largest North American customer for the C36-7 was Missouri Pacific Railroad, which took delivery of 60 units.

In 1982, Missouri Pacific merged with Union Pacific; in 2003, all but two of the MP/UP C36-7s were exported to Estonia.

- Power output: 3,600 hp (2,680 kW)

== See also ==
- List of GE locomotives
