= GE C36-7 =

Model of diesel-electric locomotives

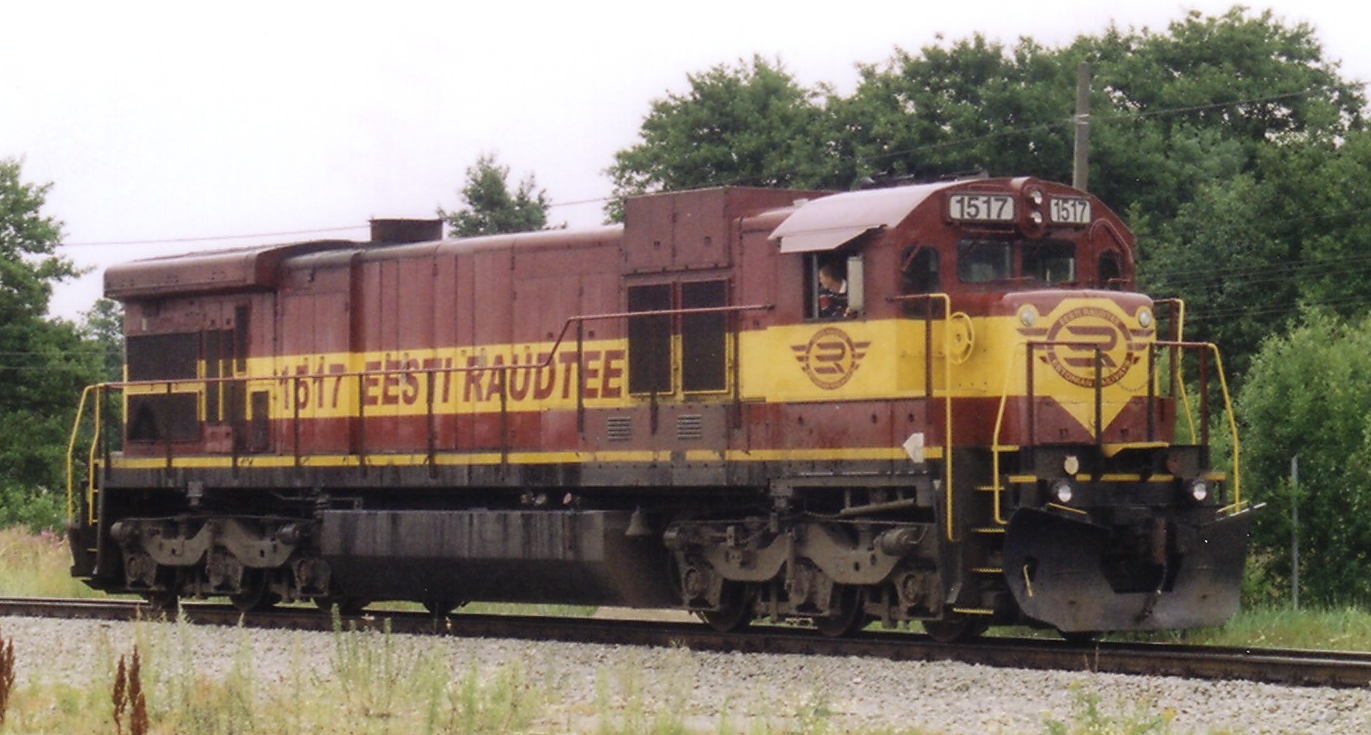
- C36-7i in Estonia.
Type and origin
- Power type: Diesel-electric
- Builder: GE Transportation Systems (most units); GE do Brazil (15 built for use in Mexico); A Goninan & Co (3 built for use in Australia)
- Model: C36-7
- Build date: 1978–1989
- Total produced: 602
Specifications
- Configuration
  - AAR: C-C
- Gauge: 1,435 mm (4 ft 8 1/2 in) as built 1,520 mm (4 ft 11 27/32 in) in Estonia
- Loco weight: 366,000 lb to 420,000 lb
Performance figures
- Power output: 3,600 or 3,750 hp (2,680 or 2,800 kW)
- Tractive effort: Starting 96,900 lbs. Continuous 91,500 lbs.
Career
- Locale: North America, Australia, Mexico, China, Gabon, Estonia

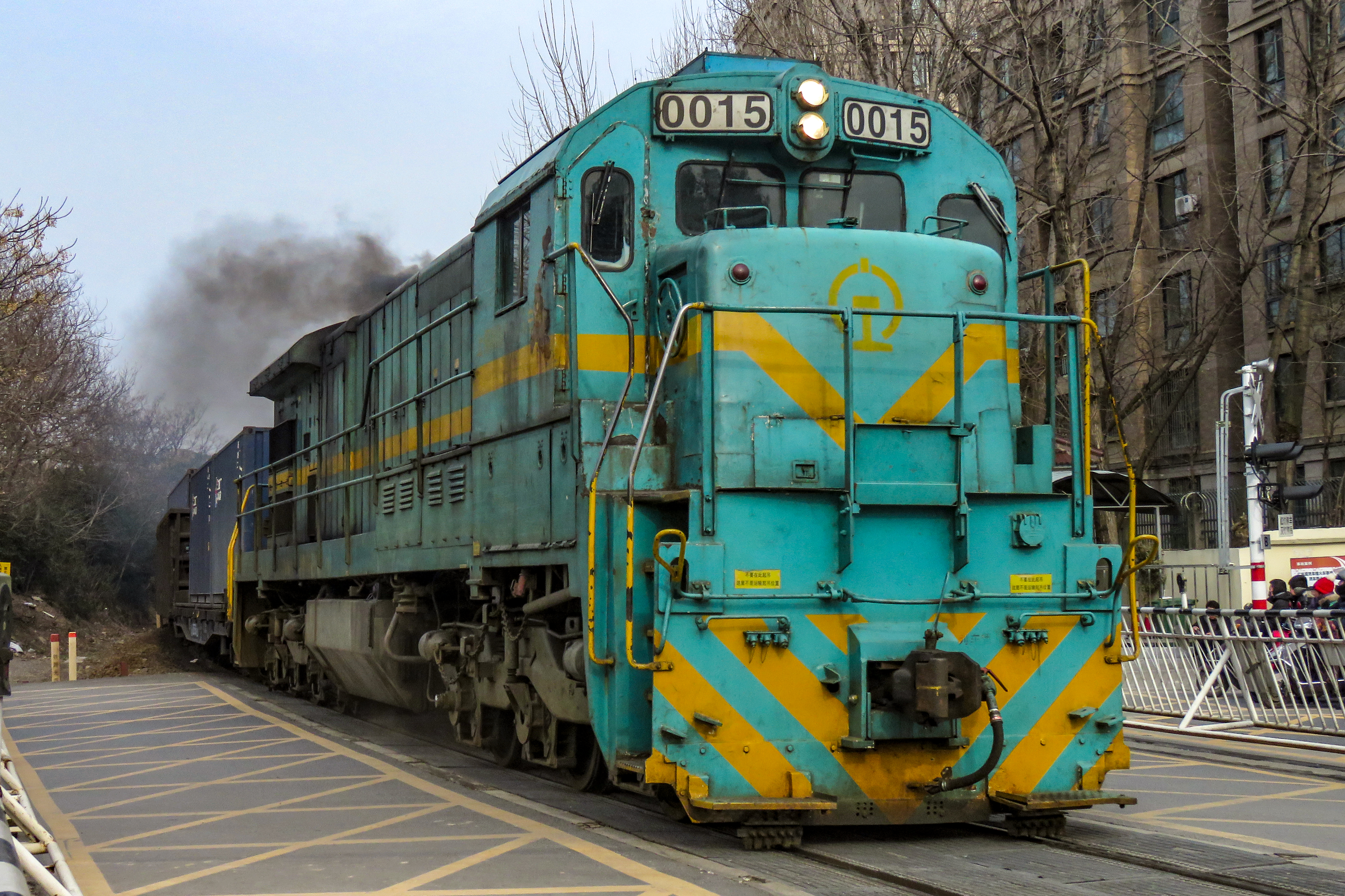
China Railways ND5

The GE C36-7 is a six-axle diesel-electric locomotive built for freight service by GE Transportation Systems, GE do Brasil and A Goninan & Co. between 1978 and 1989. The model was developed as an updated version of the GE U36C and is powered by a 16-cylinder GE FDL-series prime mover. Externally, it is similar to the GE C30-7, but can be distinguished by its larger air intakes beneath the radiator section. On later-built units, the dynamic brake resistor grids are housed in a raised compartment immediately behind the cab. C36-7 locomotives were produced with either 3,600 or 3,750 hp power ratings, depending on customer specifications.

== Production history ==
602 examples of this locomotive were built, 422 of which were exported to the People's Republic of China, where it is designated as the China Railways ND5. GE do Brazil built 15 C36-7s for Ferrocarriles Nacionales de México, numbers 9327–9341. The three Hamersley Iron units built by A Goninan & Co were exported to the United States in the late 1990s after being withdrawn from service in Australia, and were later sold to various railway companies. In 2003, 58 former Missouri Pacific units acquired by Union Pacific were exported to Estonia for Eesti Raudtee, with 19 C30-7s from Norfolk Southern and CSX.

== Original owners ==
Railroad	Quantity	Road numbers	Notes
China Railway	422	ND5.0001–ND5.0422	C36-7i, lighter version
Conrail	25	6620–6644	To CSX and Norfolk Southern.
Ferrocarril del Pacífico	15	419–433	To N de M.
General Electric (testbed)	1	505	
Hamersley Iron	3	5057–5059	
Missouri Pacific Railroad	60	9000–9059	To Union Pacific. Majority later sold to Eesti Raudtee.
Ferrocarriles Nacionales de México	25	9317–9341	
Norfolk and Western Railway	31	8500–8530	To Norfolk Southern.
Norfolk Southern Railway	12	8531–8542	
OCTRA (Trans-Gabon Railway)	8	CC301–CC308	
