= GE C30-7 =

American diesel-electric locomotive class

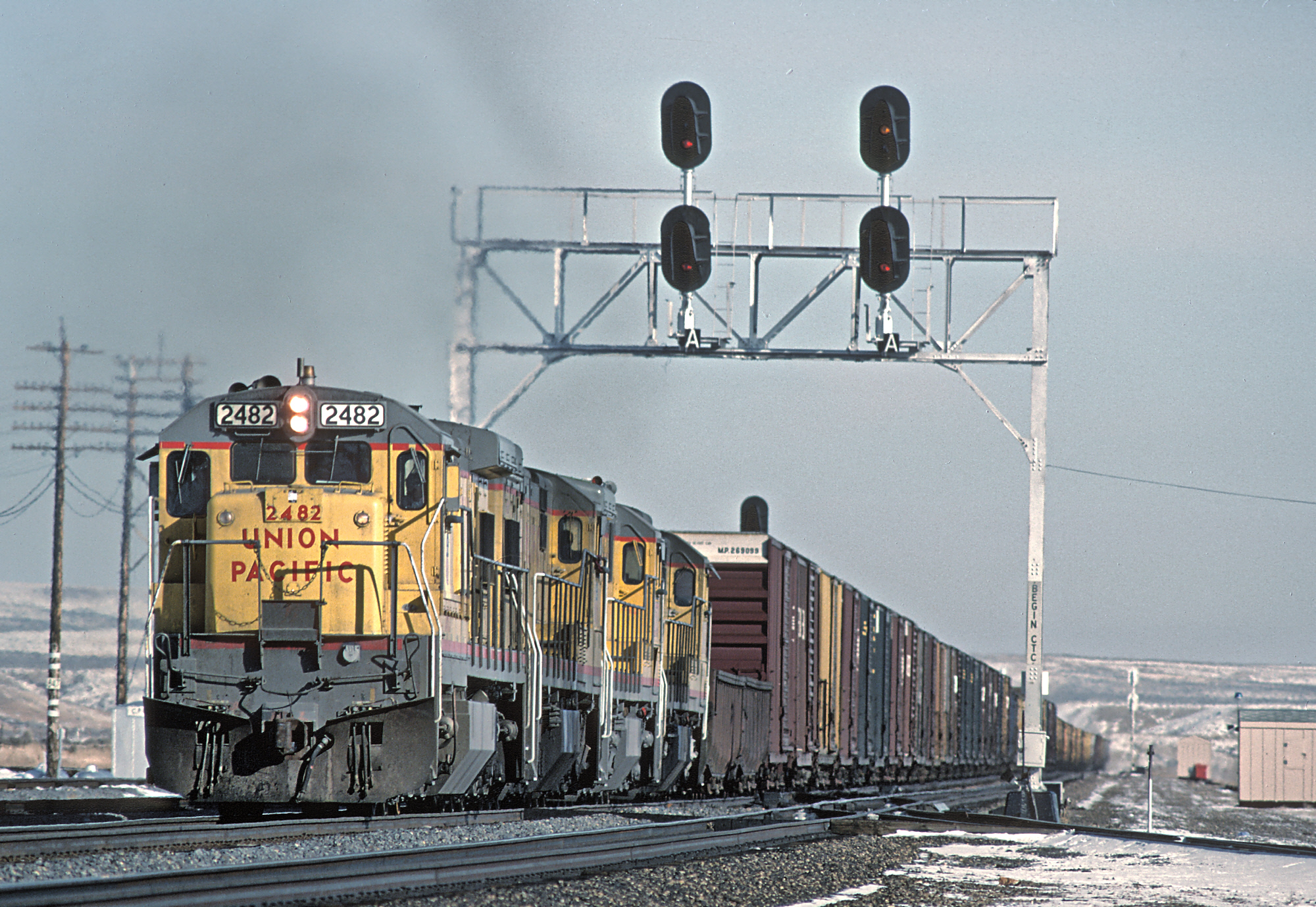
- UP 2482 at Granger, Wyoming in 1984
Type and origin
- Power type: Diesel-electric
- Builder: GE Transportation Systems
- Model: C30-7
- Build date: 1976–1986
- Total produced: 1,137 (including 50 C30-7As)
Specifications
- Configuration
  - AAR: C-C
  - UIC: Co'Co
- Gauge: 4 ft 8 1/2 in (1,435 mm) standard gauge 1,520 mm (4 ft 11 27/32 in), Estonia
- Fuel type: Diesel
- Prime mover: GE 7FDL-16, 7FDL-12
- Engine type: V16 (V12 on C30-7A)
- Generator: Auxiliary Generator: GY 27 Alternator: GY27
- Traction motors: 6x GE 752
- Cylinders: 16 (12 on C30-7A)
- Transmission: Diesel-electric
- MU working: AAR
- Loco brake: Dynamic brake, Westinghouse
- Train brakes: Westinghouse
- Couplers: Knuckles coupler
Performance figures
- Maximum speed: 70 mph (110 km/h)
- Power output: 3,000 hp (2,200 kW)
- Tractive effort
  - Starting: 91,600 lbf (407 kN)
  - Continuous: 91,500 lbf (407 kN) @ 9.5 mph
Career
- Locale: North America, Estonia, Brazil, Iran, Peru

The C30-7 is a six-axle diesel-electric locomotive built by GE Transportation Systems between September 1976 and May 1986. It was developed as an updated version of the U30C and is powered by a 16-cylinder GE FDL-series diesel engine rated at 3,000 horsepower (2,200 kW). A total of 1,137 units were built for North American railroads.

GE's successor to the C30-7 was the C36-7, and early C36-7 units were closely similar in appearance and design to the C30-7.

== Variants ==
=== C30-7A ===
A variant of the C30-7, 50 GE C30-7As were purchased by Conrail in mid-1984. Externally similar to the GE C30-7 model, six tall hood doors per side (in place of eight) showed it had a 12-cylinder (rather than 16-cylinder) prime mover. Both engines produced 3,000 horsepower (2,200 kW) but the C30-7A's smaller engine used less fuel. The C30-7A units were built between May and June 1984.

Chicago Freight Car Leasing Australia purchased twelve former Conrail C30-7A locomotives in 2001 and used their traction components in the rebuilding of 442 class locomotives as the GL class. These entered service in Australia from 2003.

== Original owners ==
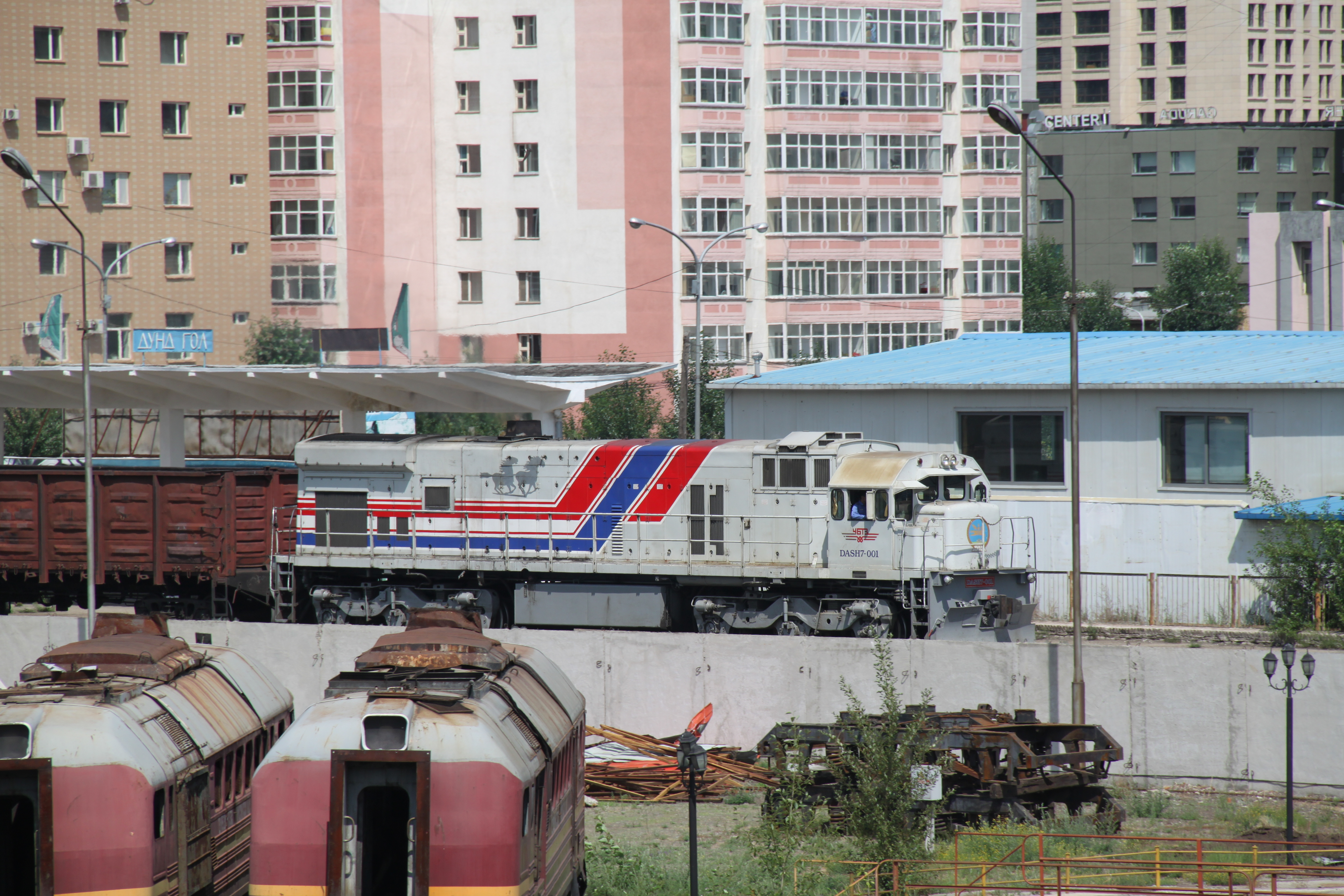
Mongolian C30-7 in service in Ulan Bator, displaying the export model cab

| Railroad | Quantity | Road numbers | Notes |
|---|---|---|---|
| Atchison, Topeka and Santa Fe Railway | 157 | 8010-8166 | Remaining units went to BNSF after the BN-ATSF merger in 1996. Most were returned to GE prior to merger and subsequently acquired by Conrail, Helm Leasing, and Union Pacific. All sold in the late 1990s to early 2000s. Many have found their way to the ALL (America Latina Logistica) Railroad in Brazil. |
| Burlington Northern Railroad | 242 | 5000-5141, 5500-5599 | BN 5500 was the first locomotive with this model, and was built in September 1976. Remaining units went to BNSF after the BN-ATSF merger in 1996. All sold in the late 1990s to early 2000s. Many have found their way to the ALL (America Latina Logistica) Railroad in Brazil. |
| Conrail | 60 | 6550-6609 | 6550-6599 were model C30-7A. 12 exported to Australia and later rebuilt into NSW GL Class locomotives. Others exported to Estonia and rebuilt for use on Eesti Raudtee. |
| Ferrocarril del Pacífico | 26 | 434-459 | |
| Louisville and Nashville Railroad | 44 | 7000-7015, 7032–7051, 7062-7069 | Delivered in Family Lines paint. |
| Ferrocarriles Nacionales de México | 305 | 6700-6799, 9600–9656, 11001-11148 | 11040-11090, 11129-11148 built from kits in Mexico |
| UBTZ | 2 | DASH7-1, DASH7-2 | Delivered with export model cabs attached to standard C30-7 bodies |
| Norfolk and Western Railway | 80 | 8003-8082 | |
| Seaboard Coast Line Railroad | 51 | 7016-7031, 7052–7061, 7070-7094 | Delivered in Family Lines paint |
| Union Pacific Railroad | 140 | 2415–2539, 2960–2974 | |

== Use in Estonia and Finland ==
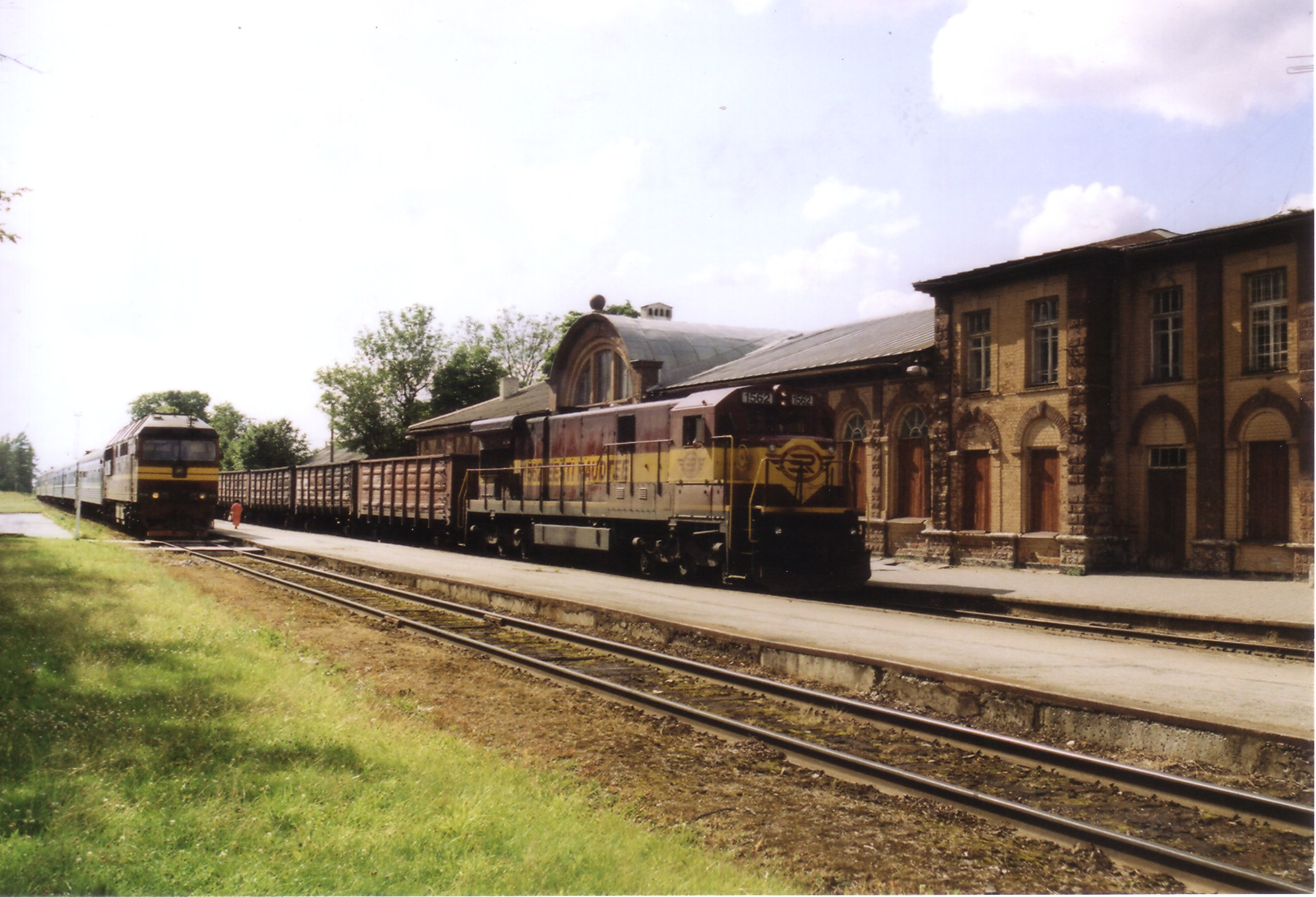
A C30-7Ai pulls a freight train through the railway station in Tapa, Estonia in 2005.

In 2003 19 C30-7As were rebuilt and exported to Estonia as C30-7Ais to be used by Eesti Raudtee which at that time was privately owned. The locomotives were numbered as part of Class 1500 (1558–1576) and were acquired second-hand the United States.

In 2018, Operail announced it had completed its first conversion of the series with #1564. Only the frames and bogies of the original locomotive were retained and the C30-M features a new centrally-positioned driver’s cab and a 1.55MW Caterpillar 3512C HD diesel engine. The converted unit has a 1524mm track gauge and weighs 138 tonnes. Operail's redesign makes the units suitable for shunting and line haul. The redesigned units are known as C30-M and were planned for internal use and export sales.

Finnish private operator North Rail has bought one C30-M locomotive and is leasing two more for its operations. These are known as class Dr21 in the Finnish classification system.

== C30-S7 "Super 7" ==
The GE C30-S7, or simply 'Super 7', was a rebuild program from the GE C30-7, a mainline American locomotive that going into the 80s, to compete with the EMD SD50 and EMD SD60 series coming out in the 1980s. The C30-S7 unfortunately, wasn't much of a success, with most going to Ferromex, Ferrocarriles Nacionales de México, and GE Transportation, mainly the leaser.

== History ==
In the 1980s, General Electric was looking to give cash-strapped railroads, primarily short lines, a good alternative to getting new locomotives, hence came the C30-7 Super 7. The name would identify it as:

C: C-C 3 Axle configuration

30: 3000 horsepower rating engine

S7: Technological Package Upgrade

A Ferrosur C30-S7 at Carmela Station, somewhere in Mexico.

A Ferromex C30-S7 returned to FNM colors.

One of the reasons why the C30-S7 came into service was due to the GE Universal Series (Known simply as U-boats), were aging, and the GE Dash 8 Series was still young, so the C30-S7 was made. C30-S7s were basically U30, U33, and U36C units, but stripped down to the core, and rebuild them using Dash 8 technology. These Super 7s were also refitted with the standard 'comfort-cabs' of the Dash 8 series. To save costs, GE heavily reused GE 752 traction motors, the heavy frame, and the 7FDL16 prime mover.

== Customers ==
Although GECX had locomotives 3000-3010, all Class 1s showed little interest, going in favor of the Dash 8s and the C32-8s and C39-8s, however, there was a very different answer to the release of the locomotive in Mexico.

The N de M (or FNM) was looking for a cheap, but powerful locomotive for their freight trains throughout Mexico, and the C30-S7 caught their attention. Over 100 of these Super 7s were rebuilt from their old U-boats, numbered in the 14000s.

As of 2026, it is unknown how many of these Super 7s there are. Most have been retired in favor of the GE Dash 9-44CWs and GE Evolution Series locomotives, however, Ferromex and Ferrosur still own some known and documented Super 7s still working yard jobs, shunting, and/or locals, but do not see revenue operations on freights, leaving that to the ES44s and EMD SD70 series, primarily SD70ACes. Most of these Super 7s have been scrapped, with these few survivors doing locals. The KCS inherited a few from the TFM, but all have most likely have been retired.

== Preservation ==
- L&N 7067 is preserved and owned by the Kentucky Steam Heritage Corporation. This unit was previously painted for Marshall University and numbered 1837.
- Brazil's only surviving C30-7A, Rumo Logistca #7202, was restored in time for use on Rumo Logistica's annual Christmas on Rails train in December 2018. This locomotive was one of seven C30-7As built for Brazil.

== See also ==
- Iranian locomotives
