= Eesti Raudtee =

Estonian railway company

Coordinates: 59.438521°N 24.734393°E

AS Eesti Raudtee
- Type: State owned
- Industry: Transport
- Founded: 1992
- Headquarters: Tallinn, Estonia
- Area served: Estonia
- Products: Freight trains
- Parent: Government of Estonia
- Website: www.evr.ee

AS Eesti Raudtee (English: Estonian Railways Ltd) known as Eesti Raudtee or EVR is the national railway infrastructure management authority of Estonia. It owns a network of 1,191 kilometres (740 mi) of broad gauge (1,524 mm (5 ft)) railway throughout the country, including the 192 kilometres (119 mi) used by the Elron commuter trains around Tallinn. It is wholly owned by the Government of Estonia.

== History ==
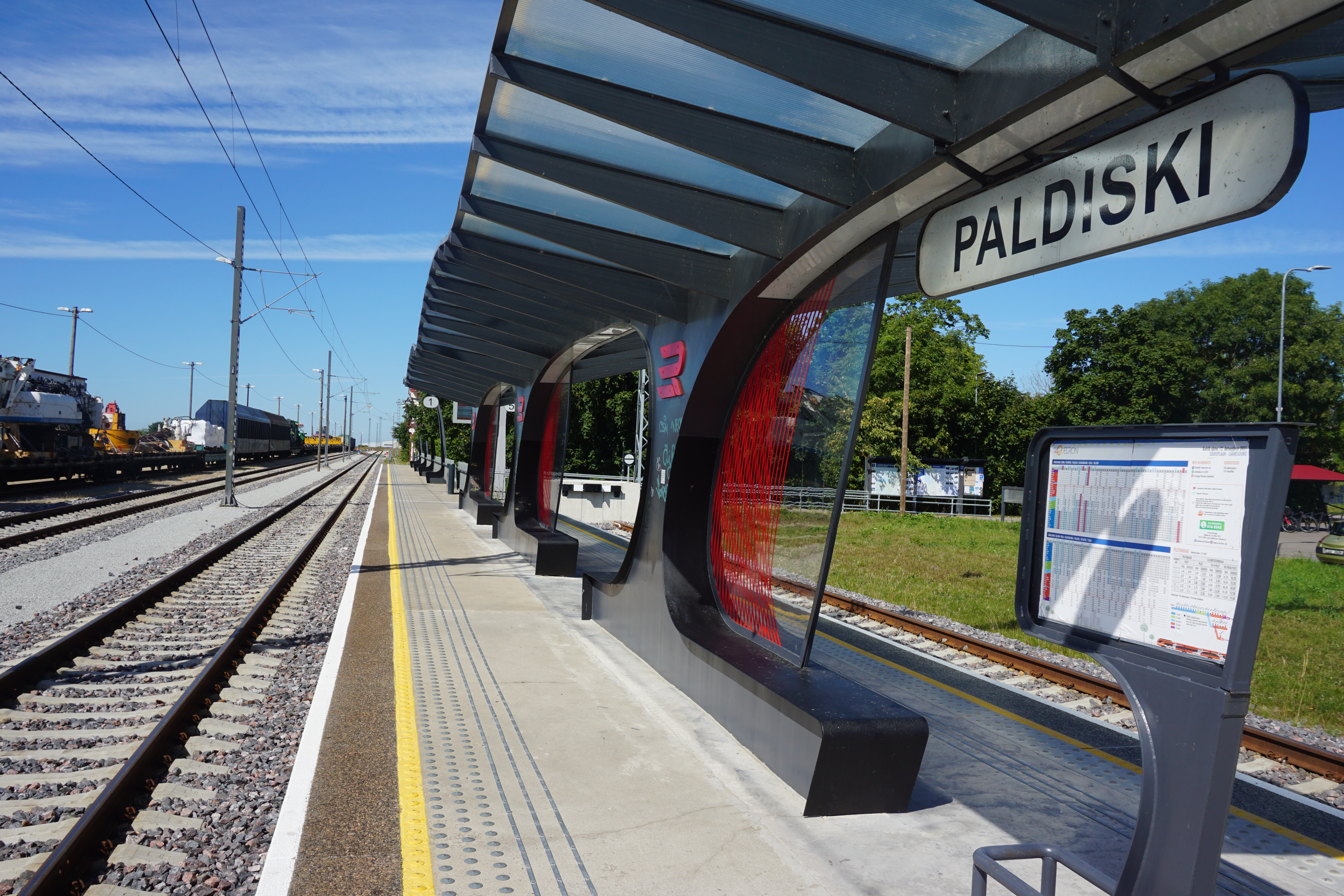
Paldiski station bearing Eesti Raudtee's logo on the platforms

=== Establishment and early operations ===
Shortly following the Estonian Restoration of Independence, the state-owned company Eesti Raudtee was established as the national railway company of Estonia on 1 January 1992. The company's activities primarily involved the movement of rail freight, particularly that of Russian oil products to the ice-free Estonian ports on the Baltic Sea; passenger services were typically provided by separate operators that ran upon Eesti Raudtee's infrastructure via a series of track access agreements.

=== Privatised era ===
By the mid-2000, it was announced that the Estonian government was seeking to privatize its railway operations. On 31 August 2001, 66 percent of the stock in the company was sold to Baltic Rail Services, a consortium of Rail World (25.5%), Jarvis (25.5%), Railroad Development Corporation (5%), and OÜ Ganiger Invest, led by Estonian entrepreneurs Jüri Käo and Guido Sammelselg, (44%).

As a result of the privatization, new management structures were promptly introduced to the company along with considerable investment aimed at instituting international best practices, amongst other goals. In 2002 58 GE C36-7s were purchased from Union Pacific followed in 2003 by 19 GE C30-7s from CSX and Norfolk Southern. Raudtee introduced a new logo along with a corporate identity during its tenth anniversary.

Following an election in 2003, the Estonian government changed the rules on open access rights and capped the level of track access charges that could be imposed, which negatively impacted Eesti Raudtee's commercial viability, causing relations between Baltic Rail Services and the state to sour. In July 2005, Baltic Rail Services issued a notice of dispute to the Estonian government that claimed there had been a breach of bilateral investment treaties. By April 2006, the dispute between the two parties had escalated to the highest levels and the potential sale of the stake in Eesti Raudtee was mooted.

=== Renationalisation and restructuring in compliance with EU legislation ===
In January 2007, Eesti Raudtee was effectively renationalized by the Estonian government, ending Baltic Rail Services' involvement. During 2009, two new EVR wholly owned subsidiaries were formed: EVR Infra, responsible for managing the railway infrastructure, and EVR Cargo, which took over the company's freight operations. This reorganisation was reportedly to comply with European Union legislation. In 2012, freight operator EVR Cargo was separated from Eesti Raudtee; around the same time, EVR Infra was renamed Eesti Raudtee.

=== Infrastructure investments and modernisation ===
The late 2010s and early 2020s were marked by a series of investments in Estonia's railway infrastructure. In December 2017, work was completed on the modernization of 57km of the key Tapa – Tartu line, facilitating passenger trains to be run at a maximum speed of 120 km/h, while freight trains were also permitted to move at up to 80 km/h. Between 2018 and 2021, the Lääne – Harju line running west from Tallinn was re-signalled by Mipro. In July 2020, the launch of a decade-long investment program, aimed at raising quality and safety levels, was announced. During December 2020, a joint venture of Spanish engineering companies Ardanuy Ingeneria and Ayesa Ingenieria y Arquitectura were awarded a €3.7m contract to produce the technical requirements and preliminary designs of an 25 kV 50 Hz electrification programme covering almost the entirety of Estonia's unelectrified railway network.

=== Regional cooperation ===
In May 2018, the company, together with the railway companies of Latvia and Lithuania, signed an agreement to jointly establish the Amber Train freight transportation route from Šeštokai through Riga to Tallinn. As one part of this initiative, a new multimodal freight terminal directly connected to Muuga Harbour was constructed, facilitating the transshipping of goods between the sea and the Estonian railway network. On 13 September 2022, the first Amber Train service departed Muuga for the Kaunas terminal; goods from the terminal will also be transported to Muuga on the return journey, the majority of which will be sent onwards to Finland.
