= Enn Kippel =

Estonian writer

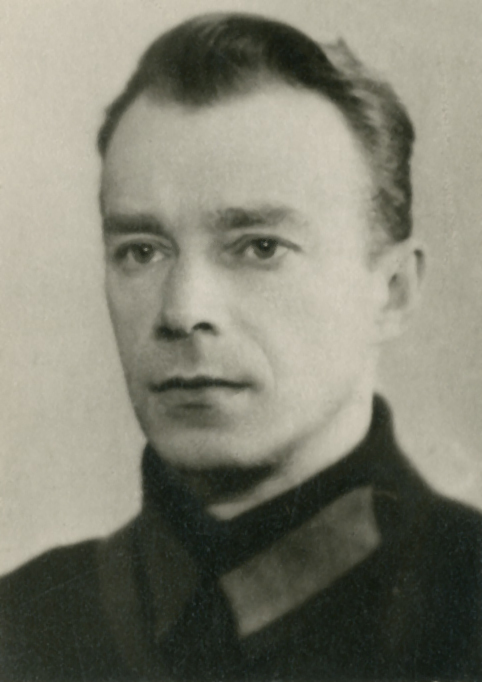
Enn Kippel

Enn Kippel (until 1935 Eduard Ferdinand Kippel; 16 February 1901 Tallinn – 15 February 1942 Leningrad) was an Estonian writer.

After 1935, he studied at the University of Tartu, taking courses related to theology. In 1936, he joined the Estonian Writers' Union. He was also a member of the left-wing student society Ühendus. In 1941, he joined the Communist Party of the Soviet Union, and he became the editor of the Estonian youth magazine Pioneer. During World War II, he was a front correspondent. He died in 1942 during the Siege of Leningrad.

== Selected works ==
- 1935: two-part novel "Ahnitsejad" ('The Greedy')
- 1939: novel "Kuldvasikas" ('Golden Calf')
- 1941: novel "Meelis"
