= Hood unit =

Body style for diesel and electric locomotives

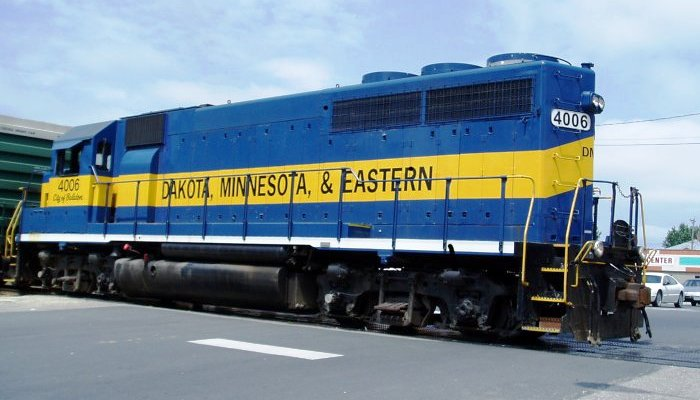
A Dakota, Minnesota & Eastern EMD GP40 running long hood forward

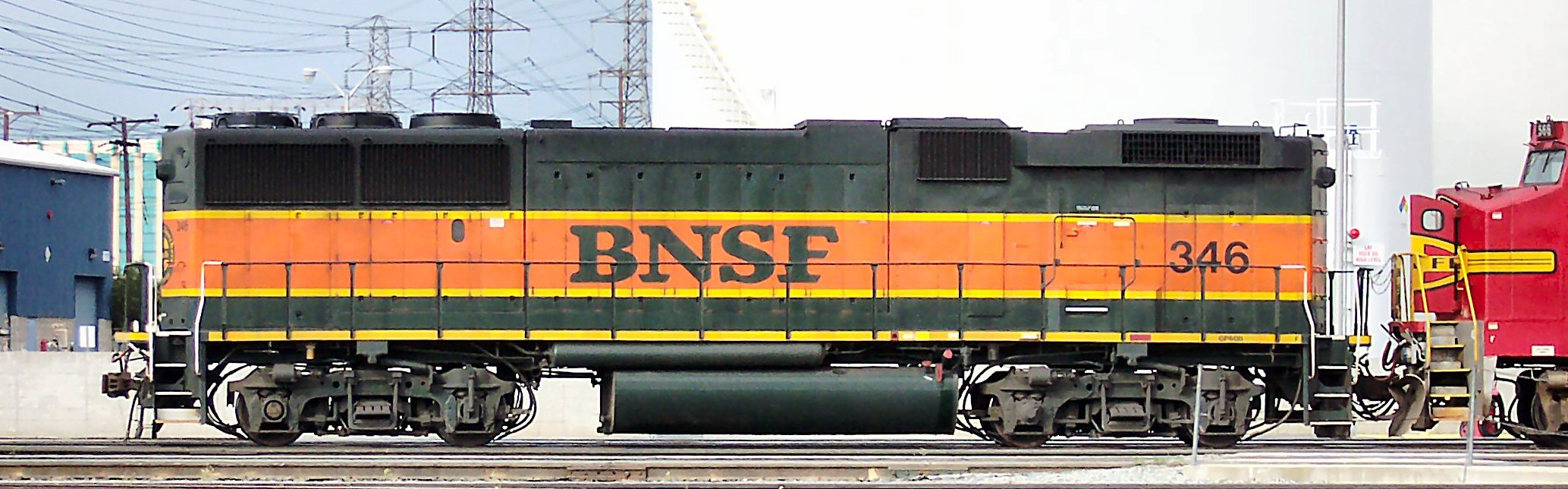
A BNSF EMD GP60B cabless hood unit

A hood unit, in North American railroad terminology, is a body style for diesel and electric locomotives where the body is less than full-width for most of its length and walkways are on the outside. In contrast, a cab unit has a full-width carbody for the length of the locomotive and walkways inside. A hood unit has sufficient visibility to be operated in both directions from a single cab. Also, the locomotive frame is the main load-bearing member, allowing the hood to be non-structural and easily opened or even removed for maintenance.

== History ==
The hood unit evolved from the switcher locomotive. A switcher's long hood is normally low enough that the crew can see over it, and there typically is no short hood. Alco introduced the road switcher concept with the RS-1, which was an enlarged switcher with a short hood ahead of the cab. This was added to provide protection for the crew in case of a collision. The low long hood was retained, though its increased length made visibility over it useless. Later, EMD introduced the GP7, which had a similar layout, though both hoods were as high as the cab roof. The high long hood became standard for virtually all hood unit locomotives thereafter.

The long hood of a locomotive is usually about as tall as the cab roof in order to fit the large prime mover and its related subsystems. Originally the short hood of the locomotive was the same height, which is referred to as a high-nose or high short hood. Starting in the mid to late 1950s, the height of the short hood was reduced to increase visibility, creating a low-nose or low short hood locomotive. Some locomotives that were originally built with a high nose were later modified to have a low nose. Lately it has become common to make the short hood not only lower but also full-width, creating a wider nose which is usually referred to as a North American Safety Cab or Canadian comfort cab.

The visibility and access advantages mean that the hood unit is overwhelmingly the most popular style of locomotive in North America, as well as many other regions.

== Operation ==
Although the crew cabin is centered on some hood units (particularly in the case of dual, relatively small prime movers), in most cases the cab is closer to one end of the locomotive than the other (in the case of a single, relatively large prime mover), breaking the locomotive up into long hood and short hood sections. It is generally preferred to run a hood unit short hood forward so that the cab is closer to the front, but there is enough visibility in the other direction that they can run long hood forward at regular speeds. Some railroad companies (notably, the Norfolk & Western and the Southern) ordered locomotives with cabs facing long hood forward so that the short hood is actually the rear of the locomotives, but that practice has become increasingly rare. This was usually done to offer greater protection to the crew in the event of a collision and to give better visibility of trackside signs and objects. Other locomotives were set up with dual control stands so that they could operate in both directions, making it unnecessary to turn the locomotive around at the end of a run. Some cabless hood units were also built. The long hood ran the whole length of those locomotives. In North America, all locomotives are required to have the letter F printed on the side sill at the end which is normally operated as its front.

== North America ==
=== Freight-oriented hood units ===
- EMD GP7
- EMD GP9
- EMD GP20
- EMD GP28
- EMD GP30
- EMD GP35
- EMD GP38-2
- EMD GP40-2
- EMD GP50
- EMD GP60
- EMD SD7
- EMD SD9
- EMD SD24
- EMD SD38-2
- EMD SD39
- EMD SD39-2
- EMD SD40
- EMD SD40-2
- EMD SD45
- EMD SD45-2
- EMD SD50
- EMD SD60
- EMD SD70 series
- EMD SD75I
- EMD SD75M
- EMD SD80MAC
- EMD SD90MAC
- EMD DD35
- EMD DD35A
- EMD DDA40X
- GE U23B
- GE U23C
- GE U25B
- GE U25C
- GE U28C
- GE U30B
- GE U30C
- GE U33B
- GE U33C
- GE U36B
- GE U36C
- GE U50
- GE U50C
- GE Dash 7 Series
- GE Dash 8 Series
- GE Dash 9 Series
- GE AC4400CW
- GE AC6000CW
- GE Evolution Series

=== Passenger-oriented hood units ===
- Brookville BL20GH
- GMD GP40TC
- EMD GP40P
- EMD GP40P-2
- EMD GP40PH-2 (rebuilt from EMD GP40Ps for NJ Transit)
- EMD GP39H-2 (rebuilt from EMD GP40s for MARC Train)
- EMD GP40WH-2 (rebuilt from EMD GP40s for MARC Train)
- EMD GP40-3H (rebuilt from EMD GP40s for CT Rail)
- EMD GP40MC (rebuilt from GMD GP40-2Ws for MBTA Commuter Rail)
- EMD SDP28 (built in the United States for Korean National Railways)
- EMD SDP35
- EMD SDP38 (built in the United States for Korean National Railways)
- EMD SDP40
- EMD SDP45
- EMD SD70MACH (rebuilt from EMD SD70MACs for Metra)
- GE U28CG
- GE U34CH
- GE Dash 8-32BWH
- MPI MP32PH-Q (rebuilt from ex-MARC EMD GP40WH-2s for SunRail)

== United Kingdom ==
The term "hood unit" is not used in the UK but a few locomotives of the hood unit type are in service. Some of these locomotives may also be classified as cab forwards when running in reverse.

- British Railways class 08 (introduced 1952)
- British Railways class 09 (introduced 1959)
- English Electric Type 1 (introduced 1957)
- British Rail class 70 (introduced 2009)

Withdrawn hood unit types include:

- British Railways 10800
- BTH Type 1
- NBL Type 1
- British Rail class 58

== France ==
The term "hood unit" is not used in France but a few locomotives of the hood unit type are or were in service:

- BB 63000
- BB 66000
- BB 66400
- Y 8000

== Germany ==
The term "hood unit" is not used in Germany but many switcher locomotives and a few freight locomotives of the hood unit type are in service:

- ADtranz DE-AC33C
- DB Class V 90
- DB Class V 100
- Vossloh G6
- Vossloh G1000 BB
- Vossloh G1206
- Vossloh G1700 BB
- Vossloh G2000 BB
- Vossloh DE18

== Turkey ==
Almost all Turkish locomotives have this design. Cab units recently imported and produced under licence.

== Czechoslovakia ==
Locomotives of the hood unit type in Czech are:

- ChME3

== China ==
Locomotives of the hood unit type in China are:

- China Railways DF2
- China Railways DF4DD
- China Railways DF5
- China Railways DF7
- China Railways DF7B
- China Railways DF7C
- China Railways DF7E
- China Railways DF7G
- China Railways DF10DD
- China Railways DF12
- China Railways HXN3B
- China Railways HXN5
- China Railways HXN5B

== South Korea ==
- Korail DEL2000 series (EMD SW8, EMD-GMC, USA, Introduced in 1951 by US army during Korea War and donated to Korea National Railroad, DEL2001, the first locomotive, is conserved as a cultural property)
- Korail DEL2100 series (EMD SW1000, EMD-GMC, USA, Introduced in 1969)
- Korail DEL3000 series (EMD G8, EMD-GMC, USA, Introduced in 1958)
- Korail DEL3100, 3200 series (DL532, ALCO, USA, Introduced in 1966, Configured by EMD-GMC components after defunct of ALCO)
- Korail DEL4000,4100,4300 series (EMD G12, EMD-GMC, USA, Introduced in 1963)
- Korail DEL4200 series (EMD G22, EMD-GMC, USA, Introduced in 1967)
- Korail DEL4400 series (GT18B-M, Hyundai Rotem, South Korea, Introduced in 2001)
- Korail DEL5000 series (EMD SD9, EMD-GMC, USA, Introduced in 1957)
- Korail DEL6000 series (EMD SD18, EMD-GMC, USA, Introduced in 1963)
- Korail DEL6100 series (EMD SDP28, EMD-GM, USA, Introduced in 1966)
- Korail DEL6200 series (EMD SDP38, EMD-GM, USA, Introduced in 1967)
- Korail DEL6300 series (G26CW, EMD-GM, USA, Introduced in 1969)
- Korail DEL7100, 7200, 7500 series (GT26CW, EMD-GM, USA, Introduced in 1975)
- Korail DEL7300, 7400 series (GT26CW-2, Hyundai Rotem, South Korea, Introduced in 1989, Licensed Production)

== Indonesia ==
=== Freight-oriented units ===
- BB202 (EMD G18)
- CC202 (EMD G26)
- CC205 (EMD GT38ACe)

=== Passenger-oriented units ===
- BB203 (GE U18A1A)
- CC203 (GE U20C)
- BB200 (EMD G8)
- BB201 (EMD G12)
- BB204

=== Mixed units ===
- BB302 (Indonesian Railways Class BB302)
- BB303 (Indonesian Railways Class BB302)
- BB305
- CC201 (GE U18C)
- CC206
- CC204

=== Shunter units ===
- BB300
- BB306
- D300
- D301
- C300
