= GE U50C =

Model of 40 American locomotives

- U50C #5005 running through Cajon Pass in January 1972
Type and origin
- Power type: Diesel-electric
- Builder: General Electric
- Model: U50C
- Build date: 1969 – 1971
- Total produced: 40
Specifications
- Configuration
  - AAR: C-C
  - UIC: Co'Co'
- Gauge: 4 ft 8 1/2 in (1,435 mm) standard gauge
- Trucks: 2
- Length: 79 ft (24.08 m)
- Fuel type: Diesel
- Prime mover: Dual GE FDL-12
- Engine type: Diesel engine
- Aspiration: Turbocharger
- Traction motors: 6x
- Cylinders: 24 (12 per engine)
- Transmission: Diesel-electric
- Loco brake: Westinghouse air brake, Dynamic
- Train brakes: Westinghouse air brake
- Safety systems: Leslie S-5T-RF air horn
Performance figures
- Power output: 5,000 hp (3,700 kW)
Career
- Operators: Union Pacific Railroad
- Nicknames: U-Boats
- Locale: North America
- Retired: 1977–1978
- Disposition: All scrapped

The GE U50C was a 5,000 hp (3,700 kW) diesel-electric locomotive built by GE Transportation Systems. Each was powered by two 2,500 hp (1,860 kW) diesel engines.

== History ==
Forty units were built between November 1969 and November 1971 solely for the Union Pacific, which numbered them 5000 to 5039. The U50C used a pair of three-axle trucks instead of the four two-axle trucks used on the earlier U50. Again, these were reused trucks, this time from the later, 8,500 hp (6,300 kW) GE turbine locomotives.

Development of the U50C was to the same UP specification that produced the EMD DDA40X "Centennial" units—a requirement for a high power locomotive for the railroad's high-speed freight trains. The span-bolster B+B-B+B design was not suited to this service, and the requirement for power at speed rather than low-speed hauling meant six powered axles would be sufficient.

The design incorporated extensive weight-saving features. GE replaced the 16-cylinder prime movers of the U50 with advanced 12-cylinder engines, lighter and shorter. The engines were reversed in orientation compared to the U50 so the radiator sections were at the middle of the locomotive instead of the ends of the carbody. The shorter length required a wider radiator section design, as on the U33B and U33C locomotives.

The U50C was not successful. The weight-saving measures taken to make the locomotive able to use six axles rather than eight caused problems, especially in the electrical wiring; Aluminum wires instead of the regular copper had been used, which proved prone to overheating. The U50Cs had many electrical fires as well as other failures; the UP rewired one unit with copper experimentally and considered having an outside contractor replace the wiring on all the units, but decided that the problems as a whole were too serious. The trucks suffered from stress cracks in the cast frames; the engines frequently developed low oil pressure; the cooling water leaked, and the dynamic brake grids were prone to melting down.

A business downturn in 1976 proved the end of the U50C in service; all were withdrawn, although many were stored in serviceable condition. No return to service occurred, though five were lent out as stationary power generators during a coal miners' strike in early 1978. All were sold for scrap during 1977–1978.

== See also ==
- Union Pacific GTELs
- EMD DD35A
- ALCO Century 855
- GE U50
