= U33 =

U33 may refer to:

- German submarine U-33
- HMS Opossum (U33), a sloop of the Royal Navy
- Small dodecicosidodecahedron
- Small nucleolar RNA Z195/SNORD33 family
- GE U33B, a diesel-electric locomotive
- GE U33C, a diesel-electric locomotive
