= Sandbox (locomotive) =

Container used in locomotives to drop sand on the rail to improve traction

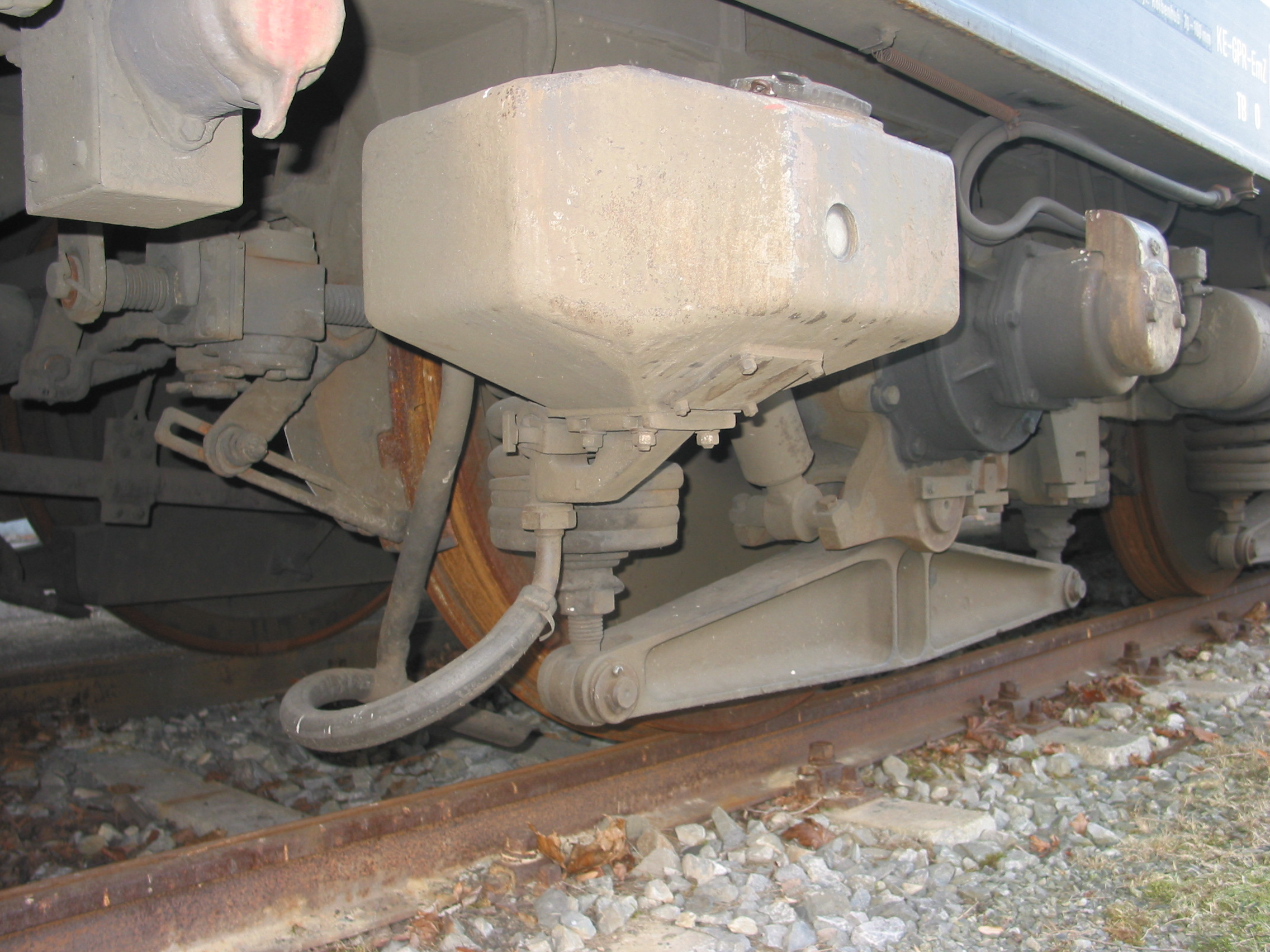
Sandbox and delivery pipe of a DB Class 103

A sandbox is a container on most locomotives, multiple units and trams that holds sand, which is dropped on the rail in front of the driving wheels in wet and slippery conditions and on steep grades to improve traction.

== Sand delivery ==
The sand may be delivered by gravity, by a steam-blast (steam locomotives) or by compressed air. Sanding requires that the sand be dry so that it runs freely. Locomotives use multiple sandboxes, so that their delivery pipes could be short and nearly vertical. Engine sheds in the UK were equipped with sand drying stoves, so that sandboxes could be refilled each morning with dry sand. Steam locomotives in the US had a single sandbox, called a sand dome, atop the boiler where the rising heat helped to dry the sand. Even with this arrangement, sand pipes tended to clog, and by the 1880s, pneumatic sanding systems were being proposed.

== Steam sanding ==
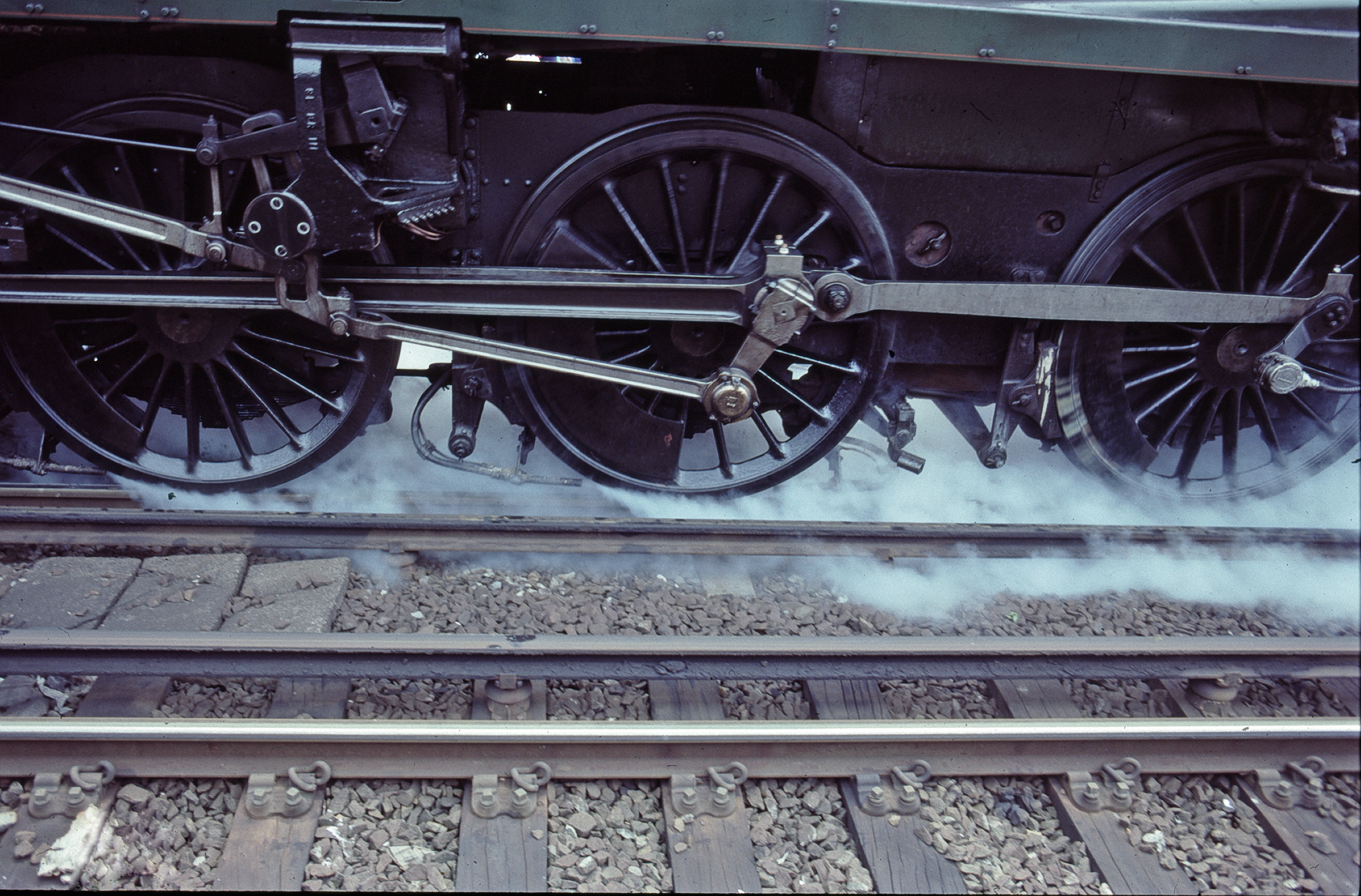
Steam sanders in use

The development of steam sanding was influential on locomotive design. As the sand could then be blown horizontally and directly under the wheels, it was no longer blown away by cross-winds before it could be effective. This prompted a resurgence of interest in some older single-driver locomotive designs, that had previously been limited by their adhesion performance. The development of Holt's steam sanding gear on the Midland Railway in 1886 prompted Johnson to design his successful 'Spinners' of 1887, twenty-one years after the previous Singles. These 'modern Singles' would continue in production for a further sixteen years on a number of British railways, including the Great Eastern, Great Western, Great Central and Great Northern, and a famous single example, number 123 on the Caledonian Railway, which remained in main-line service until 1935.

== Diesel and electric locomotives ==
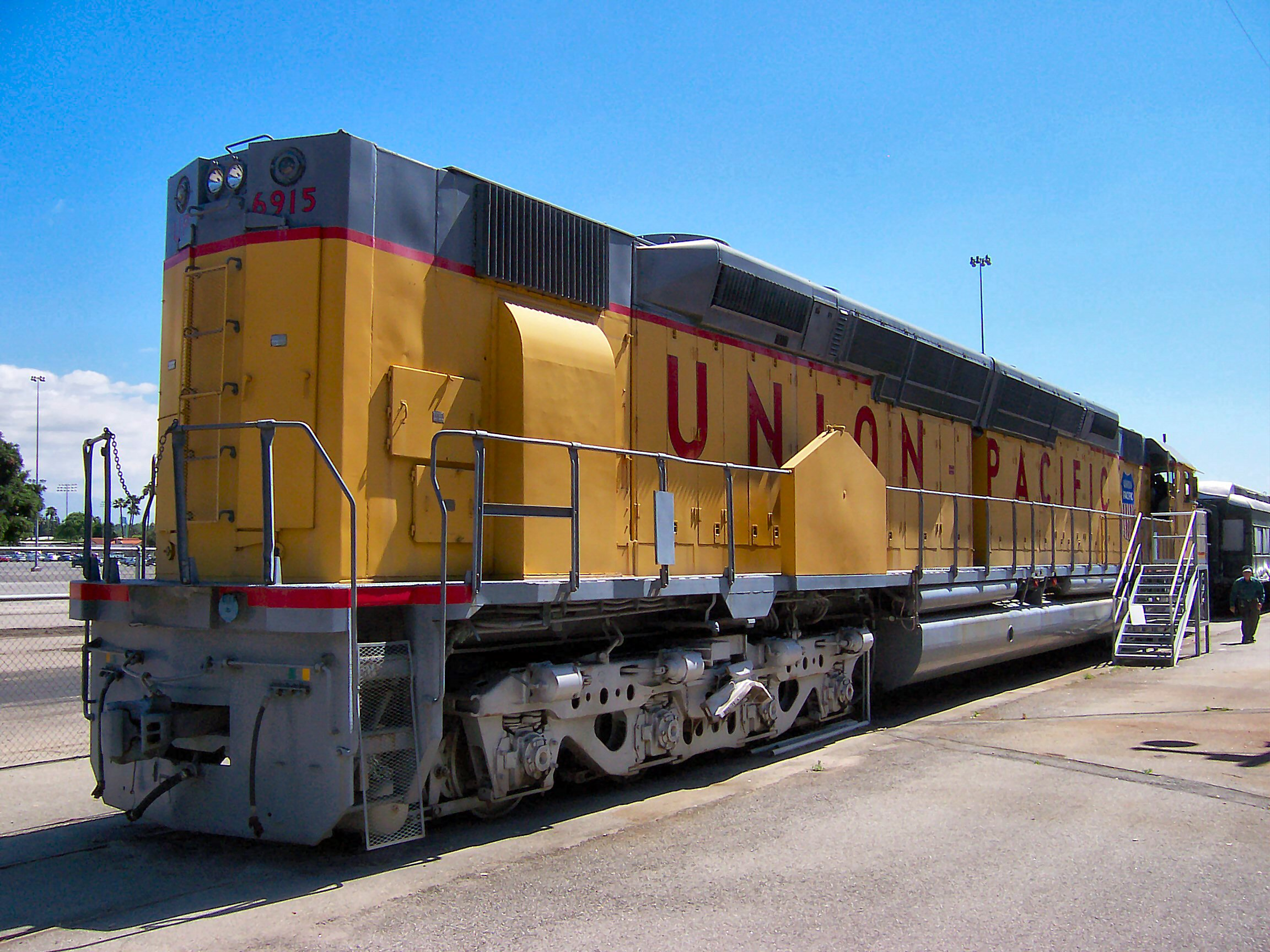
Like the EMD DD35 and DD35A, the DDA40X had large sandboxes incorporated into the side walkways.

On diesel and electric locomotives and railcars, sandboxes are fitted close to the wheels so as to achieve the shortest possible length of delivery pipe. Depots may have a sand drier installed to warm and to dry the sand before it is used.

== Dangers ==
Braking sand scattered at a low speed can cause an electrical isolating effect between the wheel and the rail, in the case of individually driven traction vehicles, this interferes with locomotive electrical signaling and braking operations. The Federal Railway Authority in Germany instructed the railway companies to avoid sanding at speeds of 25 km/h (16 mph) (or less) on disc-braked locomotives.

In its report of 20 August 2013, the ARD magazine report mentions near misses when the use of brake sand interfered with the electrical contact between wheel and rail, thereby overriding train control systems. For this reason, the Swiss Federal Railways do not permit sanding for braking locomotives.

On 1 August 2013 there was a near-collision between two S-Bahn trains at Mainz Main Station. On 24 September 2013 the Federal Railway Authority announced that the cause was too much brake sand on the tracks.

If too much sand is applied, it can lead to problems, especially at the track points or level crossings, where the sand cannot slip sideways. Lastly, the sand increases the friction between rail and wheel flange, which counteracts the wheel flange lubrication; the reduced wheel flange lubrication increases the danger of the wheels climbing up the rail, and also increases wear of the wheels and rails.

== See also ==
- Friction
- Sandite
- Slippery rail
- Wheel slide protection
