= ALCO Century 855 =

Model of diesel-electric locomotive

- Union Pacific 61 Union Pacific 60B, the only Century 855B built
Type and origin
- Power type: Diesel-electric
- Builder: American Locomotive Company (ALCO)
- Serial number: 84730–84731 (A units), 84732 (B unit)
- Model: DL855, DL856
- Total produced: 3 (two A units, one B unit)
Specifications
- Configuration
  - AAR: B+B-B+B
- Gauge: 4 ft 8 1/2 in (1,435 mm)
- Length: 86 ft (26.21 m)
- Loco weight: 551,400 pounds (250,111 kg)
- Fuel capacity: 6,000 US gal (5,000 imp gal; 23,000 L)
- Prime mover: Dual ALCO 251
- Engine type: Dual V16 diesel
- Generator: Direct Current GT598 generator
- Traction motors: DC traction motors
- Cylinders: 32 (2 x 16)
- Transmission: Electric
Performance figures
- Power output: 5,500 hp (4,101 kW)
Career
- Operators: Union Pacific
- Numbers: 60–61, 60B
- Locale: North America
- Delivered: July 1964
- Disposition: All 3 scrapped by 1972
- Stats given in this table pertain to cab unit

The ALCO Century 855 was a model of 5,500 hp (4,101 kW) diesel-electric locomotive built in 1964 by the American Locomotive Company for the Union Pacific. The locomotive was notable for being ALCO's most powerful diesel-electric locomotive and, at the time, the most powerful diesel locomotive ever built, being surpassed by the 6,600-horsepower (4,922-kilowatt) EMD DDA40X in April 1969.

The Century 855 was designed and built specifically for Union Pacific, which was in need of very high horsepower locomotives for its Overland Route through the Rocky Mountains. Despite its impressive power output, all three examples of the class were scrapped by early 1972 due to mechanical unreliability.

== History ==
Powered by a pair of 16 cylinder ALCO 251C diesel engines, and rated at 5,500 hp (4,101 kW), it was ALCO's answer to the EMD DD35A and the GE U50. The C855 rode on four two-axle trucks, grouped in pairs linked by span bolsters, giving a wheel arrangement of B+B-B+B. The trucks and bolsters were similar to those under UP's earlier turbine locomotives. Only two A units and one B unit were built, all for the Union Pacific, which had also requested double-engined locomotives from EMD and GE in order to replace the turbines, which had become uneconomical to operate.

Union Pacific also wished to reduce the number of locomotives needed on a consist, to keep in line with their allowable gross weight limit. By consolidating several locomotives into one or two, this allowed them to lower the axle load on the rails, but to stay within the limits placed by the company. They spent their lives in the general freight pool at North Platte; ALCO fitted these units with aluminium wires instead of regular copper (to reduce construction costs), but overheating, electrical fires, and constant shutting down by its twin prime movers led to their early retirement and eventual scrapping by February 1972, after only being in service for less than eight years.

== See also ==
- List of ALCO diesel locomotives
- ALCO DH643
