= Union Pacific GTELs =

Fleet of gas-turbine–electric locomotives

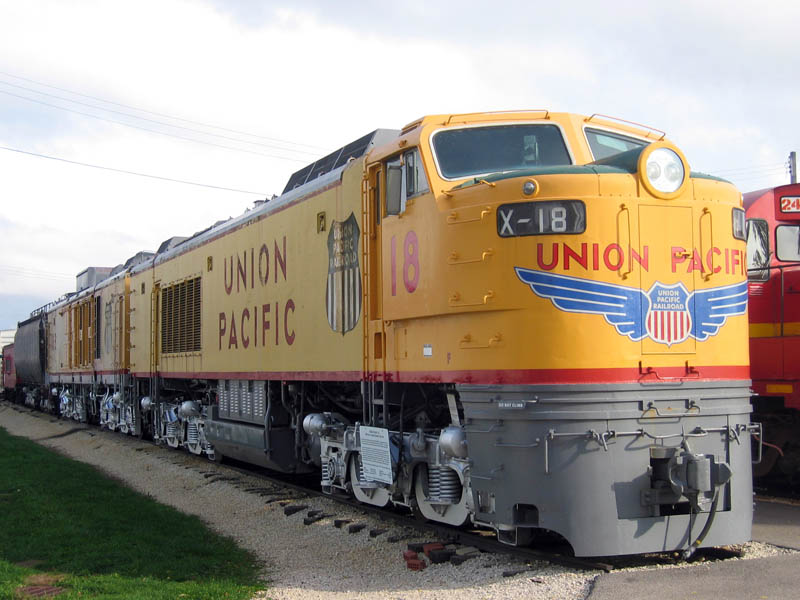
- Union Pacific 18, a third-generation GTEL with four three-axle "C" trucks, preserved at the Illinois Railway Museum
Type and origin
- Power type: Gas-turbine–electric
- Builder: Alco-General Electric (1948–53); General Electric
- Model: GE 101 1948 Demonstrator Prototype
- Build date: January 1952 – June 1961 (production)
- Total produced: 55
Specifications
- Configuration
  - AAR: B+B-B+B 1st & 2nd Generation (C-C)+(C-C) 3rd Generation
- Gauge: 4 ft 8 1/2 in (1,435 mm)
- Trucks: 4
- Length: 83 ft 6.5 in (25.464 m) (Prototype)
- Loco weight: 500,000 lb (230,000 kg) Prototype; 552,000 lb (250,000 kg) 1st Generation; 849,212 lb (385,196 kg) for 3rd Generation
- Fuel type: Bunker C heavy fuel oil (UP 57 used compressed propane fuel from May 1953 to January 1954)
- Prime mover: GE 5-Frame Gas Turbine 3rd Generation
- Engine type: Cummins 250 hp (190 kW) "donkey engine" 1st and 2nd generation. Cooper Bessemer 850 hp (630 kW) 3rd Generation.
- Traction motors: GE 752E1 1st and 2nd Generation, GE 752E3 3rd Generation.
- Safety systems: Twin Leslie Tyfon A-200 air horns 1st & 2nd generation. Leslie S-5T-RF air horn 3rd generation.
Performance figures
- Maximum speed: 65 mph (105 km/h) (according to GE tests).
- Power output: 4,500 hp (3,400 kW) 1st & 2nd Generation; 8,500 hp (6,300 kW) 3rd Generation
- Tractive effort: 138,000 lbf (610,000 N) 1st Generation; 212,312 lbf (944,410 N) 3rd Generation
Career
- Operators: Union Pacific
- Class: 1
- Number in class: 55
- Numbers: UP50 Demonstrator Prototype; 51–60 1st Generation; 61–75 2nd Generation; 1–30 3rd Generation
- Official name: GTEL, Gas Turbine Electric Locomotive
- Nicknames: "Verandas" 2nd Generation "Big Blows" "Bird Burners" 3rd Generation
- Locale: North America
- Delivered: January 1952
- First run: January 1952
- Last run: December 1969
- Retired: August 1963 – February 1970
- Disposition: 53 scrapped (running gear including trucks recycled for GE U50 and U50C), 2 preserved (non-operational)

The Union Pacific GTELs were a series of gas-turbine–electric locomotives built by Alco-GE and General Electric from 1952 to 1961 and operated by Union Pacific from 1952 to 1970.

== Background ==
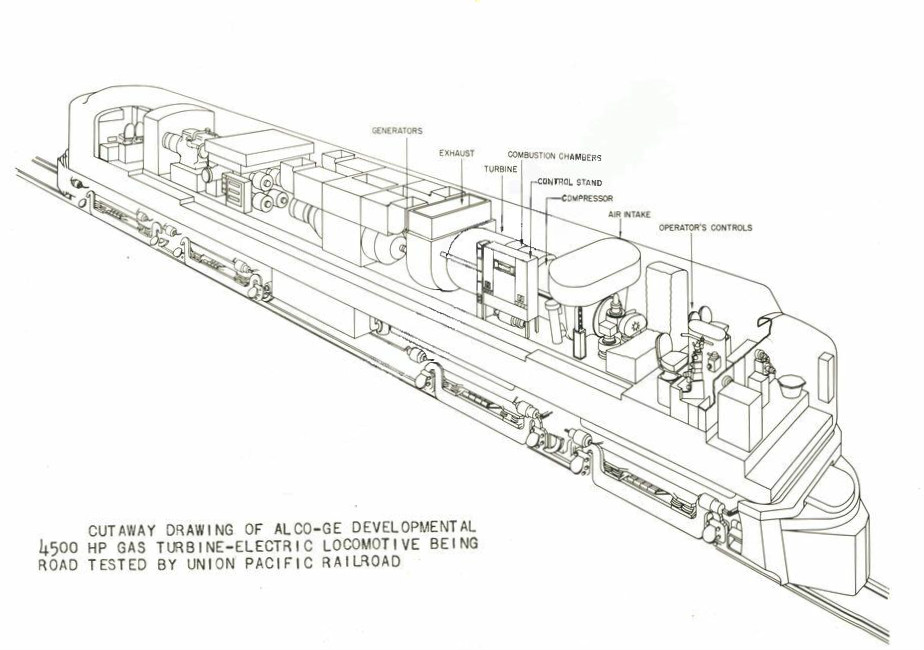
GE diagram of demonstrator locomotive UP 50

Union Pacific operated the largest fleet of gas-turbine–electric locomotives (GTELs) of any railroad in the world. The prototype, UP 50, was the first in a series built by General Electric for Union Pacific's long-haul cargo services and marketed by the Alco-GE partnership until 1953. The prototype was introduced in 1948 and was followed by three series of production locomotives. At one point, Union Pacific said the GTELs hauled more than 10% of the railroad's freight.

Fuel economy was poor, for the turbine consumed roughly twice as much fuel as an equally powerful diesel engine. This was initially not a problem, because Union Pacific's turbines burned Bunker C heavy fuel oil that was less expensive than diesel. But this highly viscous fuel is difficult to handle, with a room-temperature consistency similar to tar or molasses. To solve this problem, a heater was built into the fuel tanks (and later into fuel tenders) to heat the fuel to 200 °F (93 °C) before feeding it into the turbine. Eventually UP switched from Bunker C to modified No. 6 heavy fuel oil, which contained less pollutants and solvents. Soot buildup and blade erosion caused by corrosive ash plagued all of the turbines. Changes to the air intake systems on the production turbine locomotives improved the quality of the air that reached the turbines, which in turn reduced the wear to the turbine blades and increased the turbine's running life. The GTELs were operated into late 1969 and the final two (numbers 18 and 26) were stored at the Cheyenne roundhouse in operating condition until being retired in February 1970. Both were later sent to museums.

== Prototype ==
Union Pacific had long sought the biggest and most powerful locomotives. In the 1930s, a pair of steam-turbine locomotives were tried but rejected. Before World War II, Union Pacific had been adding diesels to its roster, but none pulled road freight trains. The idea of using four diesels to equal the power of a steam locomotive was unappealing, so the search began for something bigger. General Electric had been building gas turbines for aircraft and proposed using something similar on a locomotive. Union Pacific thought maintenance costs for a locomotive were largely independent of its power, so a smaller number of more powerful locomotives would save money.

Union Pacific decided the best way for the turbine locomotives to realize their potential would be to put them on mainline freight trains. The long runs and relatively high speeds would maximize the turbines' efficiency.

After Union Pacific expressed interest, GE built a prototype, GE 101, completed in November 1948. After tests in the Northeast during June 1949, it was renumbered UP 50. Painted in Union Pacific Armour Yellow, UP 50 began a round of tests. Union Pacific never took ownership of this locomotive. This was one of the few internal combustion locomotives in North America that had a cab at each end. The cabs themselves resembled the FA units being built by Alco-GE at that time. The sides of the locomotive had numerous air intake louvers that could be opened and closed in varying patterns.

UP 50 was a cab unit with a B+B-B+B wheel arrangement – four two-axle trucks, with pairs connected by span bolsters. The turbine produced 4,800 hp (3.6 MW), of which 4,500 hp (3.4 MW) was available for traction. This power output was more than double that of diesel–electric units of that era.

For starting, the unit's auxiliary diesel generator would power a set of windings in the gas turbine's main generator, causing the generator to rotate. The generator's rotation would begin to spin up the turbine, at which point diesel fuel would be used to start combustion. A steam generator would heat and liquefy the turbine's primary fuel supply (heavy Bunker C oil). When the turbine and fuel oil reached their minimum operating temperatures, the fuel to the turbine would be switched from diesel to the primary fuel.

This machine weighed 500,000 lb (230,000 kg) and was over 80 ft (24 m) long.

The turbines were delivered in three main groups after extensive testing of the prototype. Union Pacific intended to use the turbines to replace its Big Boy steam locomotives, which were scheduled for retirement.

== First generation ==
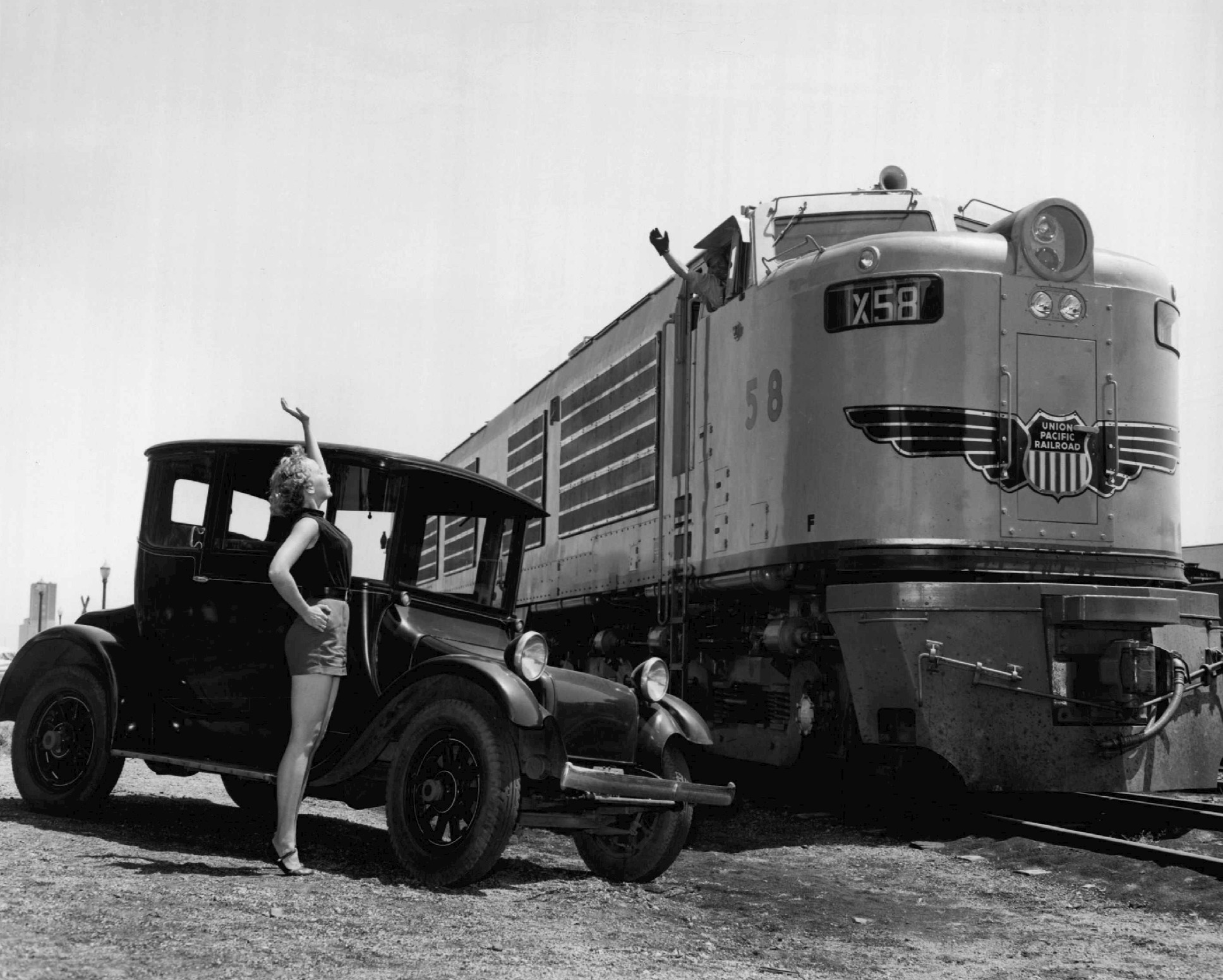
First-generation GTEL No. 58 in 1953

From January 1952 to August 1953, UP received units 51–60, like the prototype but with a cab at only one end to increase fuel capacity. Each cost US$540,000, equal to $6,546,992 today. The locomotive frame carried 7,200 US gallons (27,000 L) of fuel.

The GTELs initially pulled freights between Ogden, Utah and Green River, Wyoming, passing through Weber Canyon and Echo Canyon, Utah. In 1954, they began running Ogden–Laramie and, soon after, Ogden–Cheyenne. In 1955 and 1956, 24,000-US-gallon (91,000 L) fuel tenders were added behind the turbines, allowing them to run to Council Bluffs, Iowa.

UP 53 was used to test an improved roof-mounted air intake, which proved successful, and locomotives 57–60 were built with this intake.

In May 1953, UP 57 was converted to operate on propane using a pressurized tank car as a tender. This fuel burned cleanly and didn't foul the turbine blades as Bunker C oil did but was more difficult to transport and there were safety concerns. The project ended in January 1954 and UP 57 was converted back to Bunker C. No other conversions were done.

UP 59 and 60 were used in an experimental 9,000 hp (6,700 kW) double-turbine pair, sharing a fuel tender between them. The trailing turbine sometimes flamed out in tunnels. Despite modifications to minimize these difficulties, the experiment was discontinued, in favor of running additional diesel locomotives with the turbines.

The first-generation turbines were retired by June 1964.

== Second generation ==
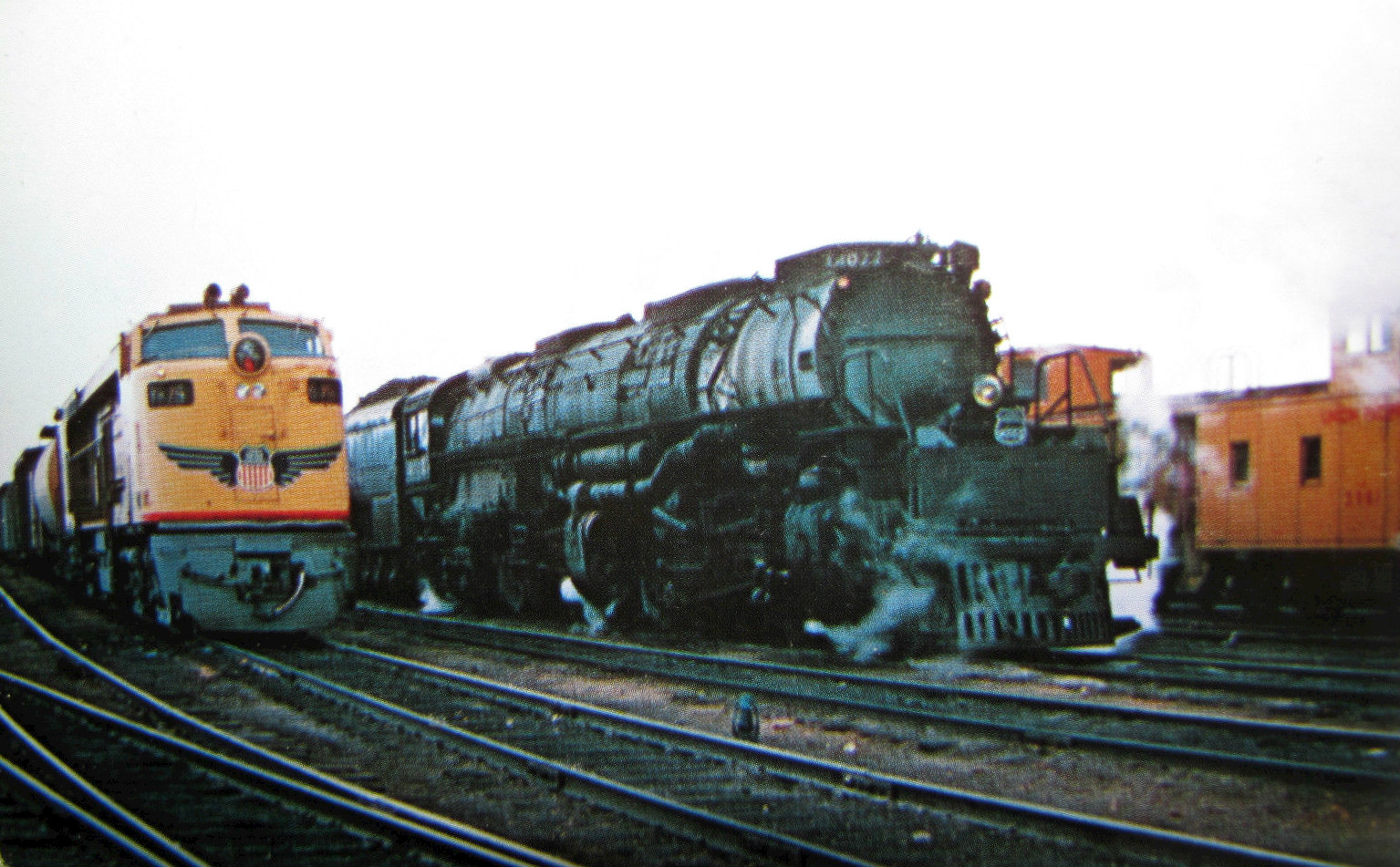
Second-generation GTEL No. 75 and Union Pacific Big Boy 4022 at Cheyenne, Wyoming in 1956

Units 61 to 75 were delivered beginning in 1954. The outside walkways along the flanks earned them the nickname "Veranda" and made them hybrids of carbody and hood locomotives. The turbine and electrical equipment were about the same, though the side louver air intakes were replaced by the large roof-mounted intake first tested on UP 53.

UP 61 was used in multiple-unit control tests with diesels starting in 1958. These tests were successful and eventually all but six of the 4,500 hp (3,400 kW) GTELs were equipped to run with diesels. As tonnage requirements increased, trailing diesel locomotives in multiple unit operation became more commonplace.

The Verandas were retired between August 1963 and June 1964.

== Third generation ==
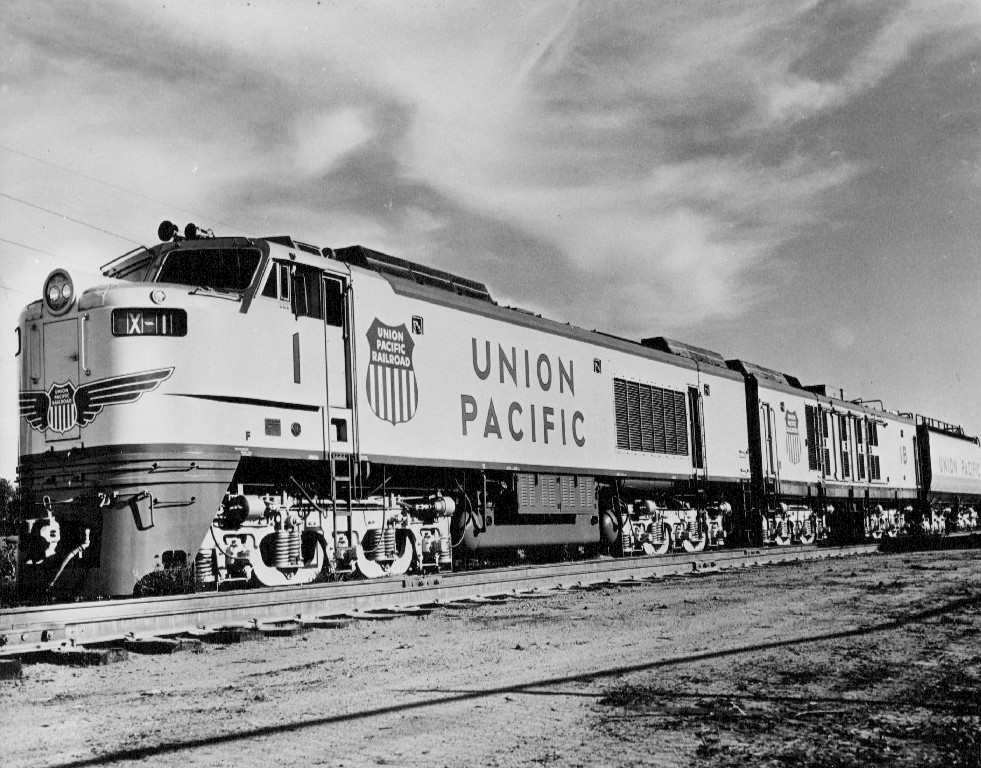
Third-generation GTEL No. 1 in 1965

In 1955, Union Pacific ordered a new turbine–electric, the world's most powerful locomotive. Each would be two units plus a fuel tender, rated at 8,500 horsepower (6,300 kW).

The A unit contained the control cab and an auxiliary diesel engine generator. The B unit carried the turbine and main generators to provide electricity to the traction motors on both the A and B units. The turbine was a new design, a GE Frame 5 simple-cycle gas turbine with a sixteen-stage compressor, ten combustion chambers and a two-stage turbine. No steam generator was needed to heat and liquify the heavy Bunker C fuel because the tenders were insulated. The original plan was to number these units in the 7000 series but they were numbered 1 to 30.

They were delivered to Union Pacific between August 1958 and June 1961. These units were very different from the previous generations, having a wheel arrangement of C-C on each of their units (not including their tenders). The locomotive weighed about 610 tons with a full tender. Continuous tractive effort was 146,000 lb (66,000 kg) with the 65-mile-per-hour (105 km/h) 74:18 gearing; in 1961 tonnage ratings were 6,740 on the 0.82% climb west from Cheyenne and 5,180 on the 1.14% east from Ogden.

The turbines in these units are the most powerful prime movers ever installed in any North American locomotive. With 8,500 hp (6,300 kW) from a single prime mover, these engines set a record that still stands. That rating was claimed to be at 6,000-foot (1,800 m) altitude and 90 °F (32 °C), and in cooler, denser air the turbine itself could exceed 10,000 hp (7,500 kW) if the electrical system could handle it. In 1963, Trains wrote, "The big 8500 h.p. jobs remain under constant scrutiny as UP: (1) jacks some of them up to 10,000 h.p. ratings; (2) considers motorizing their fuel tenders with traction motors....". Lee's book explains that UP tried resetting generator excitation to absorb the higher rating but only on test. Trains magazine mentions that the turbines' four-month trial to Los Angeles in 1962 ended when "tender wheels were motorized, imposing speed restriction". (The 1961 and 1963 timetables show a 65 mph (105 km/h) limit for all the turbines).

These turbines eventually displaced units 51 to 75. There had been problems with fuel filters clogging on the earlier turbines, so it was decided to filter the fuel before filling the locomotive fuel tanks and the tender.

Unlike the earlier turbines, the 8,500 hp (6,300 kW) turbines came with 24,000 US gal (91,000 L) fuel tenders, in addition to the 2,500 US gal (9,500 L) of diesel fuel in the locomotive tank. They had Leslie S-5T-RF air horns on the cab roof (later moved to the mid radiator section of the A unit, in response to ice build-up in the bells).

The third-generation turbines were all retired by 1970.

== Retirement ==
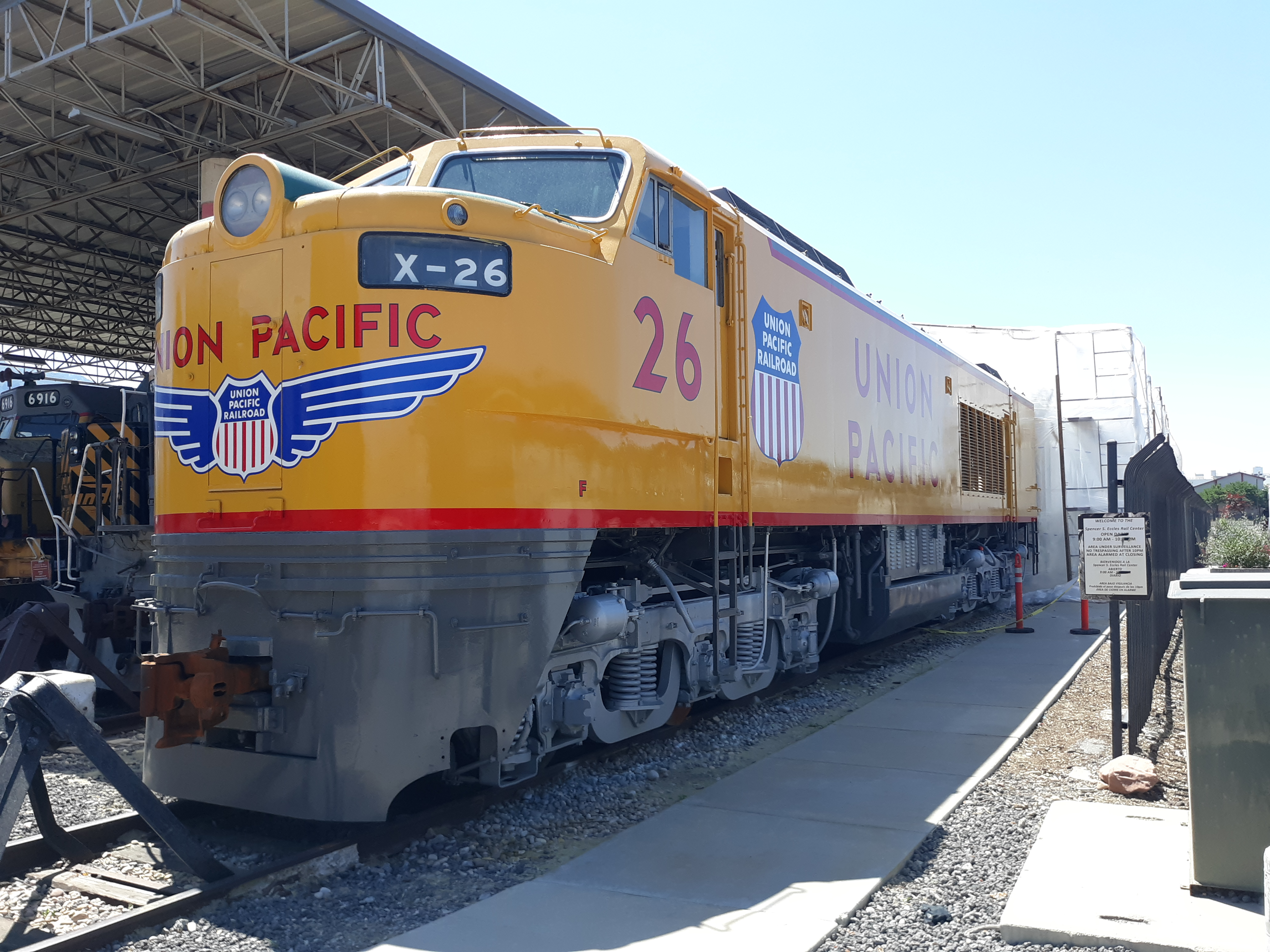
UP GTEL #26 on display at the Utah State Railroad Museum in Ogden, Utah

Bunker C's cost advantage waned as the plastics industry began to find uses for it and improved cracking techniques allowed the oil, previously considered waste, to be converted to lighter fuel grades.

The last run of a gas-turbine locomotive took place on December 26, 1969. Their running gear was recycled into the GE U50 series of locomotives. Trucks, traction motors and span bolsters from locomotives 51 to 75 were used in the construction of the U50, and trucks and traction motors from locomotives in the 1 to 30 series were used in the construction of the U50C. Several of the tenders were retained and converted to hold water for maintenance of way purposes and later to be used for Union Pacific's operating steam locomotives: 844, 3985 (until 3985's retirement) and 4014.

The prototype, first-generation and second-generation turbines were all scrapped by 1964 with none left for preservation. Two third-generation turbines were preserved: UP 18 at the Illinois Railway Museum and UP 26 at the Utah State Railroad Museum in Ogden, Utah. Both are static displays, with neither of the turbines reported to be in operable condition, nor planned to be restored.

UP 18's tender UP 907853, built in 1937, had a long history; first built for use with UP's FEF series steam locomotives before conversion to turbine use, it served as a water tender from the 1970s to 1984 for trains such as the Expo '74 and the American Freedom Train before being donated to the Kansas Railroad Museum, and then acquired by the IRM.

== Experimental coal-burning turbine ==
In October 1962, Union Pacific constructed an experimental GTEL of its own, using a modified ALCO PA-1 as a cab, the chassis of a GN W-1-class electric locomotive (bought for scrap from the Great Northern Railway) as the second unit, a modified turbine prime mover removed from one of the 50 to 75 series locomotives, and a tender salvaged from one of its own “Challengers”.

The consist had an A1A-A1A+2-D+D-2, wheel arrangement, 18 axles of which 12 were powered. The PA-1's 2,000 hp (1.5 MW) diesel engine was retained and the B unit carried the main power plant for the main generators, which contributed 5,000 hp (3.7 MW) for a total power output of 7,000 hp (5.2 MW). The coal tender was rebuilt from that of Challenger steam locomotive number 3990. The setup was numbered 80, but changed to 8080 in 1965 to avoid conflict with the new EMD DD35s then being introduced.

The blade erosion and soot build-up problems encountered in the earlier locomotives were magnified with the coal turbine. Grinding coal into fine particles was also troublesome but necessary because any oversized coal particles could damage the turbine blades. Ultimately, the experiment was declared a failure and was scrapped after spending only 20 months in service.

The conventional gas turbines each racked up well over 1,000,000 miles (1,600,000 km) in revenue service but the coal turbine prototype ran less than 10,000 miles (16,000 km) before being struck from the UP roster on March 15, 1968. The PA-1 control unit was traded to EMD, while the turbine unit and tender were scrapped at the Omaha shops.

== See also ==
- Turbine–electric powertrain
- Combined cycle powered railway locomotive
- GT1 locomotive – the most powerful gas-turbine locomotive in the world
