= GE U50 =

American diesel-electric locomotive class (1963–1977)

- U50 #50 on an eastbound freight at Laramie, Wyoming.
Type and origin
- Power type: Diesel-electric
- Builder: General Electric
- Model: U50
- Build date: 1963 - 1965
- Total produced: 26
Specifications
- Configuration
  - AAR: B+B-B+B
- Gauge: 4 ft 8 1/2 in (1,435 mm)
- Trucks: 4
- Length: 83 ft 6.5 in (25.46 m)
- Fuel type: Diesel
- Prime mover: Dual GE FDL-16
- Engine type: Diesel
- Aspiration: Turbocharger
- Traction motors: 8
- Cylinders: 2x V16 Engine
- Transmission: Diesel electric
- Loco brake: Air Independent Brake, Dynamic brakes
- Train brakes: Westinghouse air brake
Performance figures
- Maximum speed: 70 mph (110 km/h)
- Power output: 5,000 hp (3,700 kW)
- Tractive effort: Starting: 160,000 lbf (710 kN); Continuous: 139,500 lbf (621 kN)
Career
- Operators: Union Pacific Railroad; Southern Pacific Railroad
- Nicknames: U-Boats (UP); Baby Hueys (SP)
- Locale: North America
- Delivered: 1963 - 1965
- Retired: 1973 - 1977
- Disposition: All scrapped

The GE U50 was an eight-axle, 5,000 hp (3,700 kW) diesel-electric locomotive built by GE Transportation. They were twin-engined locomotives, combining two 2,500 hp (1,900 kW) diesel engines on one frame.

== Configuration and history ==
The U50 rode on four two-axle trucks, grouped in pairs linked by span bolsters, giving a wheel arrangement of B+B-B+B. The trucks and bolsters were re-used from scrapped UP turbine locomotives built by GE during the 1950s. Owing to the wheel arrangement, the U50 was sometimes inaccurately referred to as the U50D, a back-formation from the U50C name given to the six-axle units. The name is incorrect and was never used by the manufacturer or the railroad. None of the U50s rode on D trucks in any case. It is also sometimes referred to as the U50B, but this is incorrect as well.

The U50 was built in response to the Union Pacific Railroad's requirement, issued in the early 1960s, for a 15,000 hp (11,200 kW) 3-unit locomotive intended to replace the turbines. The design was effectively two U25B locomotives on a single frame; each diesel engine and generator powered only the two trucks at the same end. Three were delivered to the UP in October 1963, and three to the Southern Pacific Railroad in May and June 1964. Other locomotives built to this requirement were the EMD DD35A and the ALCO Century 855.

The Southern Pacific kept their three but did not order any more. They were kept on the roster until the late 1970s but were often sidelined. While the UP's units were nicknamed "U-Boats", the SP's units gained the nickname "Baby Hueys" from the cartoon character of the same name. Original numbers were #8500 - #8502; they were later renumbered #9550 - #9552 and renumbered again to #9950 - #9952. Southern Pacific's three units differed from the Union Pacific U50s by having a front cab door and headlights in the hood beneath the front windows.

The Union Pacific was more satisfied with their three and ordered 20 more. A batch of 12 were delivered between July and September 1964, while a final eight were built May through August 1965. They were numbered #31 - #53. UP #52 was delivered with a Cummins PT fuel system and rated at 5,600 horsepower. The #52 had a standard fuel system installed in October 1966 and was rerated to 5,000 horsepower.

Twenty of the Union Pacific U50s were withdrawn from service in 1973 and 1974 and traded in to GE for U30Cs. The last three Union Pacific units remained on the roster until April 1977. The Southern Pacific's three survived in service until 1977; all were sold for scrap by 1979. No examples of the U50 type were preserved, however the door off the nose of SP #9950 survives at the Southern California Railway Museum.

== See also ==
- GE U50C
- Union Pacific GTELs
- EMD DD35A
- ALCO Century 855
