= Alco-GE =

Defunct locomotive company

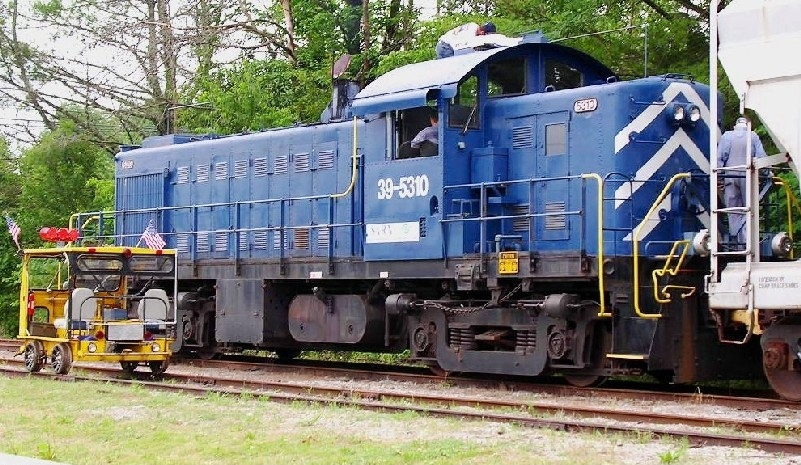
- The RS-1 was a highly successful Alco-GE model.
- Company type: Partnership
- Industry: Locomotive
- Founded: 1940
- Defunct: 1953
- Members: American Locomotive Company and General Electric

Alco-GE was a partnership between the American Locomotive Company and General Electric that lasted from 1940 to 1953. Their main competitor was EMD.

== Arrangement ==
Alco produced locomotive bodies and prime movers while GE supplied the electrical gear. Alco had previously partnered with GE and Ingersoll-Rand to produce the first successful line of diesel-electric switch engines from 1924 to 1928. In forming the Alco-GE partnership, GE sought to expand the market for their electrical equipment after EMD started producing their own while Alco gained GE's support in terms of marketing and service infrastructure, areas in which EMD had a formidable advantage.

== Achievements ==
Notable locomotives produced by Alco-GE were the RS-1, the first road switcher locomotive, and UP 50, a prototype gas turbine-electric locomotive.

Alco-GE attained a 26% share of the market for diesel locomotives as of 1946, mainly for switching and short-haul applications, but they could not crack EMD's dominant position in mainline locomotives. Alco's development of higher powered engines for such locomotives had not been satisfactory and EMD's introduction of the GP7 road-switcher in 1949 threatened Alco-GE's position in their most advantageous market.

== Dissolution ==
GE dissolved the partnership in 1953 to develop and build their own locomotives. Alco still received electrical gear from GE, but only as a customer and not a corporate partner. GE took over the gas turbine-electric venture in 1953 and during the early 1960s would replace Alco as EMD's strongest competitor in the North American market. Alco left the locomotive market in the United States in 1969.
