= EMD DD35 =

American diesel-electric locomotives (1963–1981)

EMD DD35 & DD35A
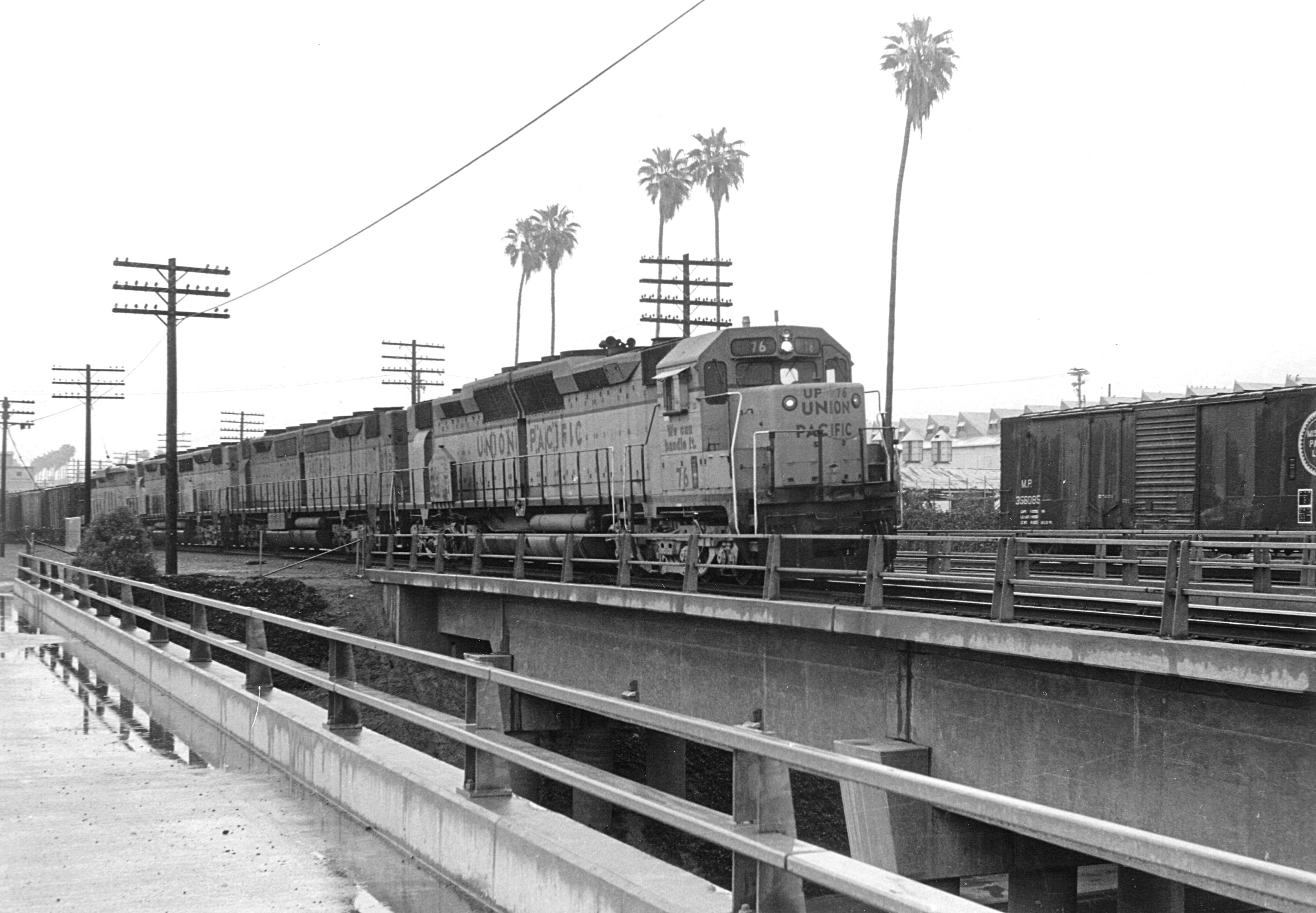
- A Union Pacific Railroad DD35A leads two DD35s and a GP30B in March 1979.
Type and origin
- Power type: Diesel-electric
- Builder: General Motors Electro-Motive Division (EMD)
- Model: DD35
- Build date: 1963–1964 (DD35); 1965 (DD35A)
- Total produced: 30 (DD35); 15 (DD35A)
Specifications
- Configuration
  - AAR: D-D
  - UIC: Do’Do’
- Gauge: 4 ft 8 1/2 in (1,435 mm)
- Wheelbase: Between truck centers: 65 ft 0 in (19.81 m); Truck wheelbase: 17 ft 1 1/2 in (5.22 m)
- Width: 10 ft 4 in (3.15 m)
- Height: cab roof: 14 ft 11 3/8 in (4.56 m) overall: 16 ft 4 in (4.98 m)
- Loco weight: 519,353 lb (235,575 kg)
- Fuel capacity: 8,230 US gal (31,200 L; 6,850 imp gal)
- Prime mover: Dual EMD 16-567D3A
- Engine type: V16 diesel
- Aspiration: Turbocharged
- Generator: DC generator
- Traction motors: DC traction motors
- Cylinders: 16
- Cylinder size: 8 1/2 in × 10 in (216 mm × 254 mm)
- Transmission: diesel electric
- Loco brake: Straight air, Dynamic
- Train brakes: Air
- Safety systems: Leslie Supertyfon model S5TRRO or S3LR horns
Performance figures
- Power output: 5,000 horsepower (3,730 kW)
Career
- Operators: Union Pacific; Southern Pacific
- Numbers: See § Original buyers
- Locale: North America
- Retired: 1981
- Disposition: All scrapped

The EMD DD35 was a 5,000 horsepower (3,700 kW) diesel-electric locomotive of D-D wheel arrangement built by General Motors Electro-Motive Division for the Union Pacific Railroad and Southern Pacific Railroad. A total of thirty DD35 locomotives were built from 1963 to 1964, with three going to the Southern Pacific, and the remaining twenty-seven to the Union Pacific. A cab-equipped variant, the DD35A (also called the DDA35), was built in 1965, exclusively for the Union Pacific.

== History ==
In the early 1960s, Union Pacific started asking for a 15,000 hp (11,200 kW) 3-unit locomotive set to not only replace their turbine locomotives, but to bring a new generation of diesel locomotives to their rails, and then put them into use. The EMD (Electro Motive Division of General Motors) DD35 was a cabless booster (B unit) locomotive that consisted of two GP35 locomotives prime movers (engines) and electrical systems, mounted on a common frame back-to-back, riding on a pair of 4-axle Flexicoil trucks, so each prime mover was powering a single set of 4 axles instead of two sets of 2 axles, as in the GP35. Being a "B-unit", the DD35 lacked any sort of cab, and could only be run on the main line when connected with another "A-unit" to control it. The 4-axle truck was considered too harsh on the trackwork to be in the lead, and thus EMD's response to UP's request was a 4-unit (instead of the requested 3-unit set) locomotive set, consisting of a pair of 2,500 hp GP35s sandwiching a pair of DD35s, to make one 15,000 hp locomotive set (basically six GP35s in four units).

EMD produced a demonstrator set like this in September 1963, painted in red and white (similar to the Frisco's livery). It was demonstrated on several railroads, but the only interest came from Union Pacific and Southern Pacific. UP bought the entire 4-unit demonstrator set, and followed with an order for 25 more, which were delivered from May through September 1964. The two demonstrator locomotives were numbered 72B and 73B; the 25 production locomotives were assigned 74B through 98B.

Southern Pacific ordered a small, three-unit sample, which were shipped with old-style bearings from six F3B trade-in units, but ordered no more. They were numbered 8400–8402, later 9500–9502, and still later 9900–9902. They were used on the SP's Sunset Route early in their lives, but were among the first locomotives sidelined whenever there was a downturn in traffic. Later, they were relegated to transfer service between West Colton and yards closer to Los Angeles, mainly Taylor Yard north of downtown.

EMD also produced an "A-unit" version, the DD35A, all for the Union Pacific Railroad. This led to the original DD35s being sometimes erroneously called the 'DD35B'. Fifteen DD35A locomotives, numbered 70 to 84, were built between May and July 1965. Here, the cab of a GP35 was fitted to the front end, requiring a longer frame than the DD35; the fuel tank beneath was lengthened, and the center pass-through walkway was offset a little to the rear because of the single cab. Another difference was that the DD35A was fitted with the new flared radiator section EMD was testing on its EMD 645-engined demonstrators (the prototype SD40 demonstrators).

The DD35 and DD35A orders also led to the introduction of the ALCO Century 855 and GE U50. A further development of the 8 axle, twin-engined locomotive produced the final, best-known type, the DDA40X "Centennial".

The DD35s were initially quite unreliable; some of this was blamed on sand from the internal sandboxes getting in electrical gear, so new sandboxes were fitted on the walkways in 1969. They were among the last EMD road units to be built with DC generators and old-fashioned switchgear, which were more maintenance-intensive than the later AC/DC equipment. Once teething troubles had been surmounted, the DD35s were reasonably successful, but they were less flexible than smaller units.

UP withdrew all of their original B units by 1977 as the railroad fell on harder times. SP retired all three of their units in 1978 after their leases ran out. The DD35As survived longer, spending their final months of service operating around Salt Lake City, Utah before their retirement by 1981, caused by the economic downturn of the early 1980s they were withdrawn from service. Neither the DD35 nor the DD35A survived into preservation.

== Original buyers ==
Owner	Quantity	Numbers	Notes
DD35
Southern Pacific Railroad	3	8400-8402	
Union Pacific Railroad	27	72B-98B	72B and 73B ex EMD (demonstrators) 5653 and 5655
DD35A
Union Pacific Railroad	15	70-84	

== See also ==
- EMD DDA40X
- EMD DDM45
- ALCO Century 855
- GE U50C
