= EMD DDM45 =

Meter-gauge diesel–electric locomotive

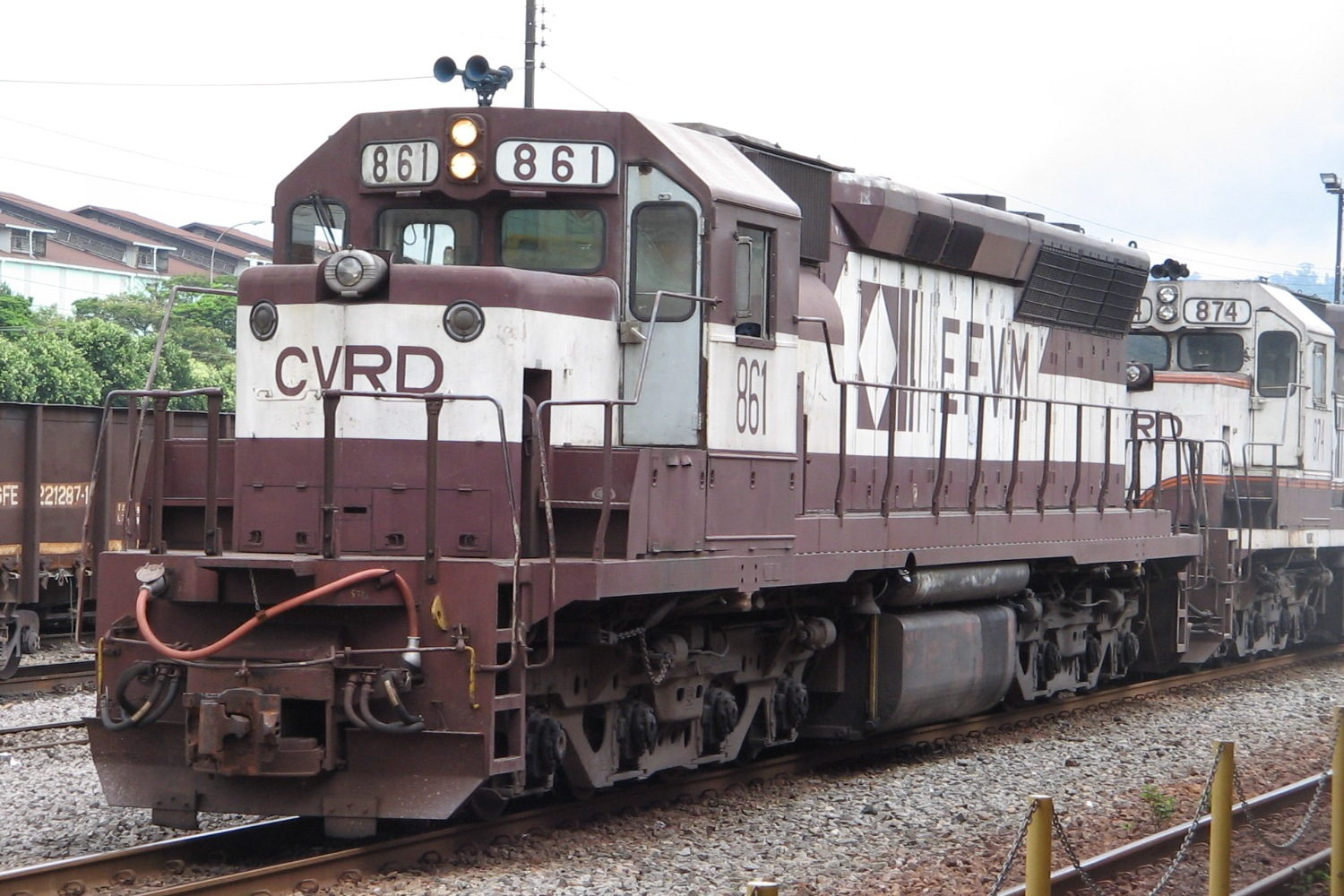
- EFVM 861, an EMD DDM45
Type and origin
- Power type: Diesel
- Builder: General Motors Electro-Motive Division
- Model: DDM45
- Build date: 1970–1976
- Total produced: 83
Specifications
- Configuration
  - AAR: D-D
  - UIC: Do′Do′
- Gauge: 1,000 mm (3 ft 3 3/8 in) metre gauge
- Wheel diameter: 1,016 mm (40.0 in)
- Minimum curve: 83 m (272 ft 4 in)
- Length: 22.352 m (73 ft 4 in)
- Width: 3.127 m (10 ft 3 in)
- Height: 4.754 m (15 ft 7 in)
- Axle load: 20.25 t (19.93 long tons; 22.32 short tons)
- Loco weight: 162 t (159 long tons; 179 short tons)
- Fuel capacity: 10,333 L (2,730 US gal; 2,273 imp gal)
- Prime mover: EMD 20-645E3
- Engine type: V20 Two-stroke diesel
- Alternator: EMD AR-10B3
- Traction motors: 8 × EMD D29
- Cylinders: 20
- Transmission: diesel–electric
Performance figures
- Maximum speed: 84.9 km/h (52.8 mph)
- Power output: 3,600 hp (2,700 kW)
- Tractive effort: 39,657 kgf (388.90 kN); 39,657 kgf (87,430 lbf)
- Factor of adh.: 25%
Career
- Operators: E. F. Vitória a Minas
- Locale: Brazil

The EMD DDM45 is a meter-gauge diesel–electric locomotive built by EMD. The DD in the name means that it has eight axles in two trucks, giving it a D-D wheel arrangement, while the M stands for the meter-gauge track it was to operate on, and the 45 represents the EMD SD45 that the engine was derived from. They were built for service on the Estrada de Ferro Vitória a Minas (EFVM) in Brazil. In the early 1970s, the EFVM needed not only to expand its locomotive roster, but to use the most powerful single-engined locomotives available, and the SD45 represented the highest-rated model that EMD had to offer at the time.

However, a large locomotive like an SD45 with its three-axle trucks was not readily adaptable to the EFVM's meter-gauge trackage. The smaller traction motors of the meter-gauge locomotive were unable to handle the full current capacity from the 3,600 hp (2,700 kW) prime mover. EMD proposed using a meter-gauge version of the Flexicoil-D four-axle bogies, similar to those found under the domestic DD35, DD35A and DDA40X locomotive models. The two additional traction motors of this design allowed full power to be used.

Roster of DDM45s:

Order number	Build date	Serial numbers	Country	Railroad	Numbers	Quantity
711197–711208	February 1970 – March 1970	34671–34682	Brazil	E. F. Vitória a Minas	801–812	12
711441–711448	March 1970 – April 1970	36303–36310	Brazil	E. F. Vitória a Minas	813–820	8
711871–711880	March 1971	37278–37287	Brazil	E. F. Vitória a Minas	821–830	10
712613–712621	March 1973 – April 1973	712613–712621	Brazil	E. F. Vitória a Minas	831–839	9
713096–713119	January 1974 – April 1974	713096–713119	Brazil	E. F. Vitória a Minas	840–863	24
713726–713735	October 1975 – December 1975	713726–713735	Brazil	E. F. Vitória a Minas	864–873	10
748027-1 to -10	January 1976 – March 1976	748027-1 to 748027-10	Brazil	E. F. Vitória a Minas	874–883	10

== See also ==
- EMD DD35
- EMD DD35A
- EMD DDA40X
