= Cab (locomotive) =

Compartment for the driver of a locomotive

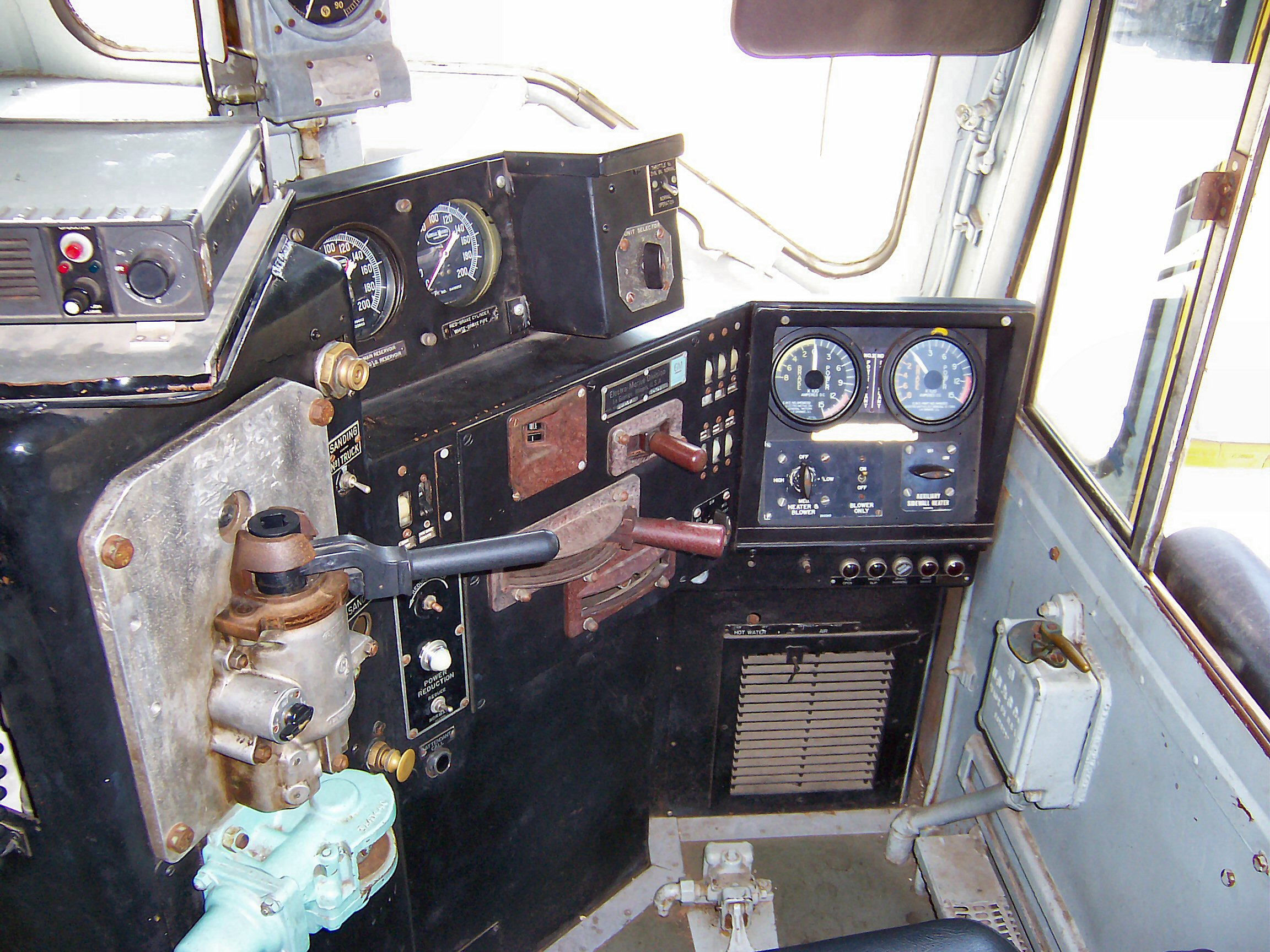
Control stand (driver's control console) of a Union Pacific Railroad "Centennial" class diesel locomotive

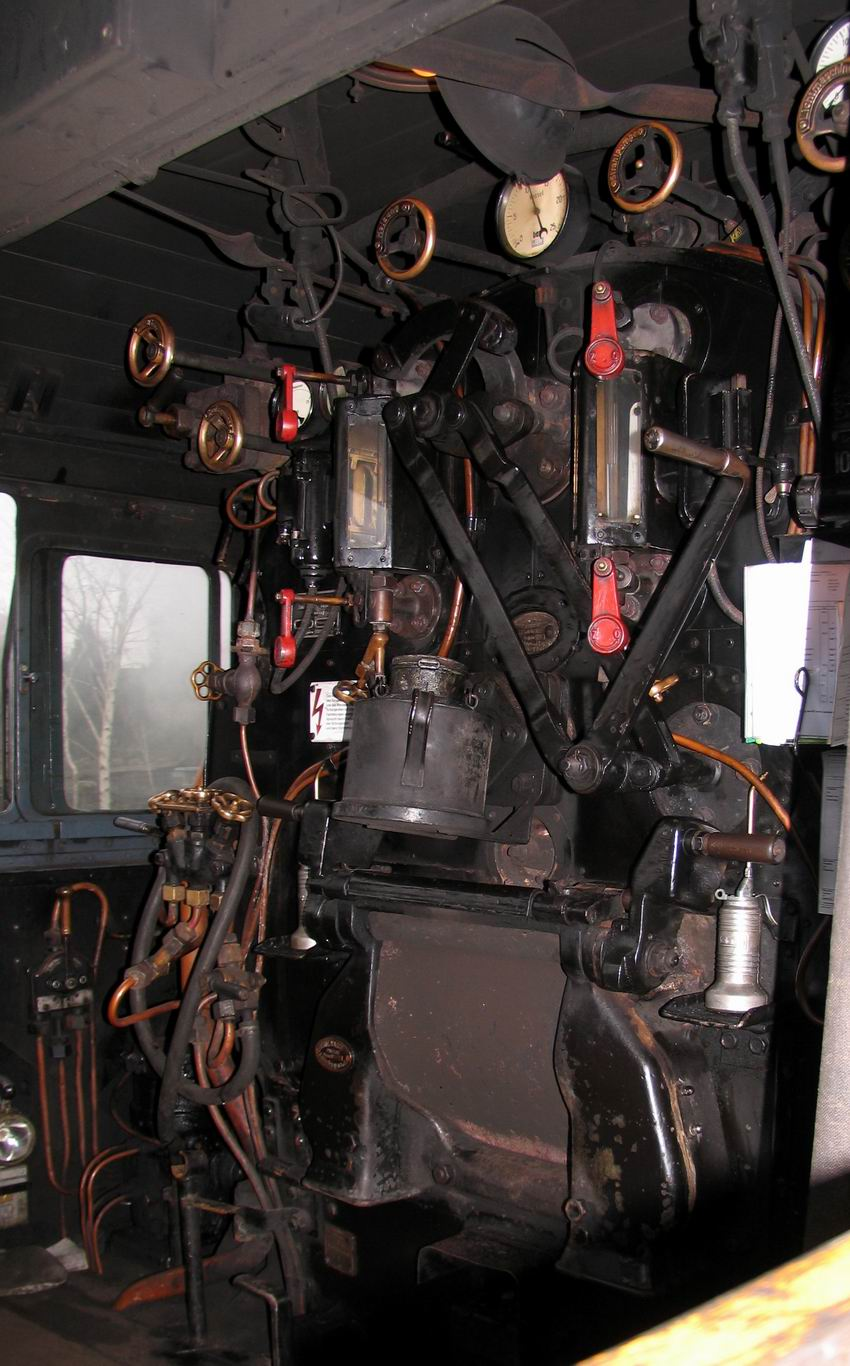
Cab of a German steam locomotive, view of the fireman's side. In the right middle of the image is clamped a driver's timetable, below which the firebox door can be seen.

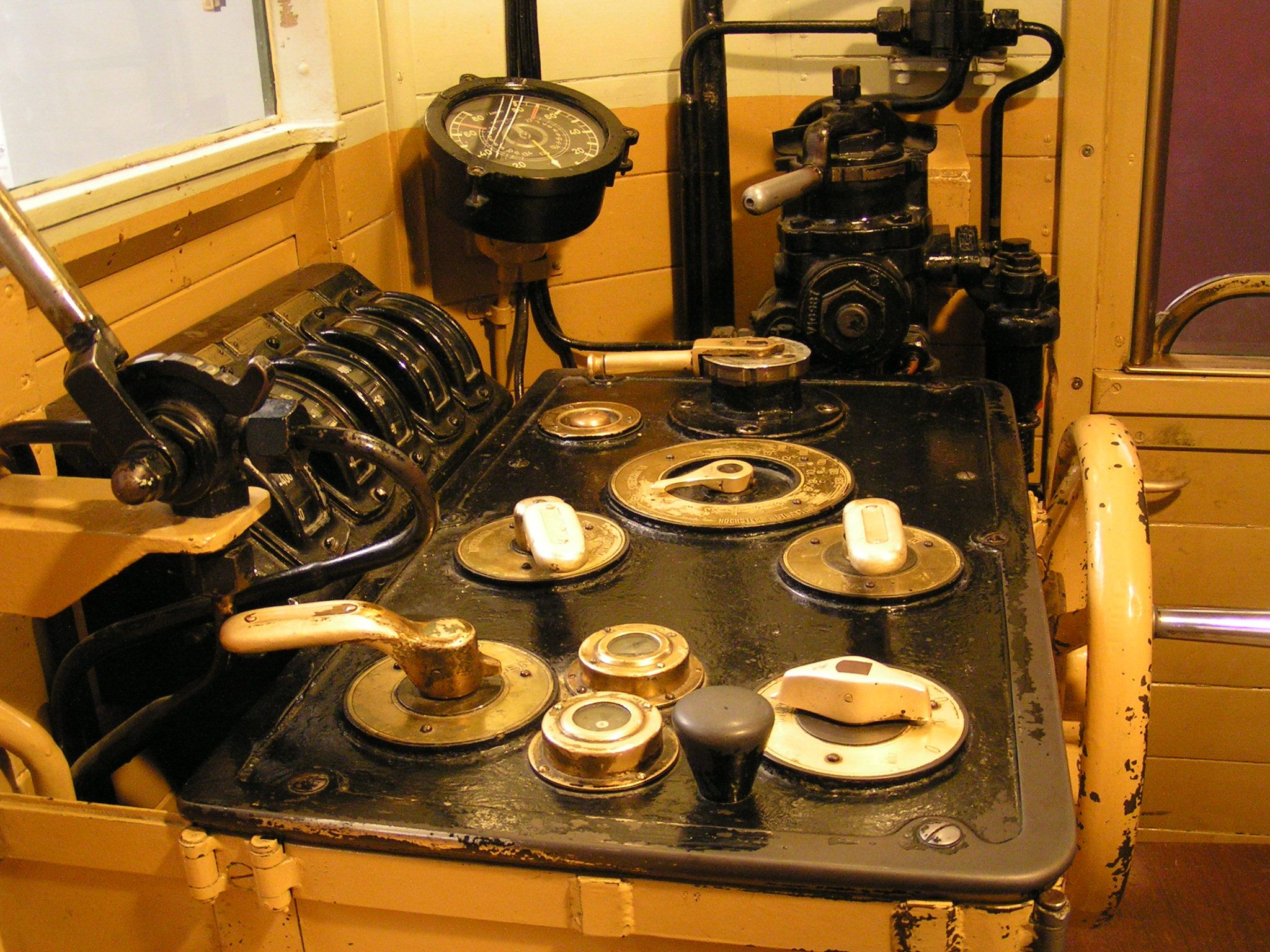
Cab of a Bavarian EP 2 electric locomotive in the Nuremberg Transport Museum, Nuremberg

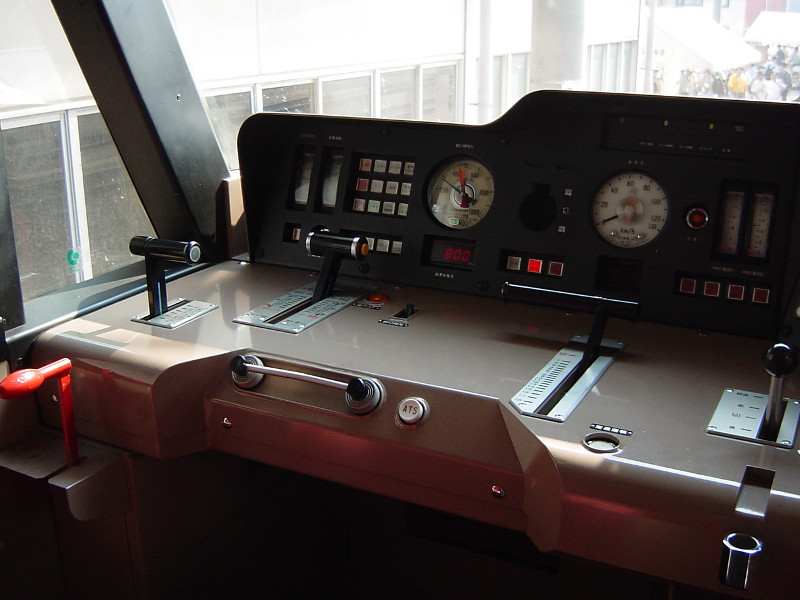
Driver's cab of a Japanese JR Freight Class EF210 electric locomotive

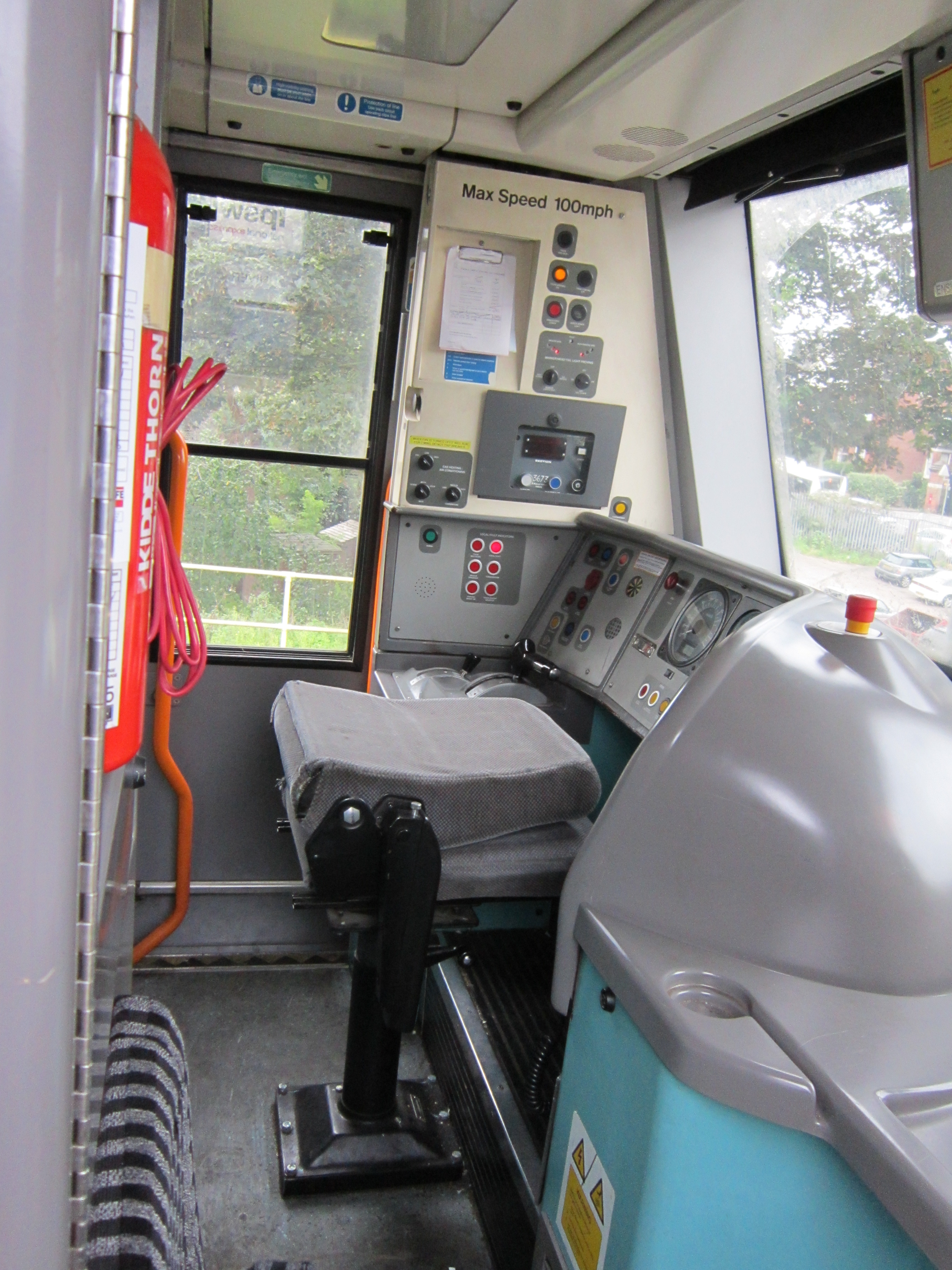
Cab of a British Rail Class 170 diesel multiple unit train

The cab, crew compartment or driver's compartment of a locomotive, control car, or a self-propelled rail vehicle, is the part housing the train driver, fireman or secondman (if any), and the controls necessary for the locomotive or self-propelled rail vehicle's operation.

== Cab locations ==
On steam locomotives, the cab is normally located to the rear of the firebox, although steam locomotives have sometimes been constructed in a cab forward configuration. Camelback locomotives often had two cabs; one for the fireman at the rear of the boiler, and one for the engineer on the side of the boiler. Camelback locomotives were built with this configuration to accommodate wider fireboxes.

The cab, or crew or driver's compartment of a diesel or electric locomotive will usually be found either inside a cabin attached to a hood unit or cowl unit locomotive, or forming one of the structural elements of a cab unit locomotive.

On self-propelled rail vehicles, the cab may be at one or both ends.

== Historical development ==
The earliest locomotives, such as Stephenson's Rocket, had no cab; the locomotive controls and a footplate for the crew were simply left open to the elements. However, to protect locomotive crews against adverse weather conditions, locomotives gradually came to be equipped with a roof and protective walls, and the expression "cab" refers to the cabin created by such an arrangement.

By about 1850, high speed Crampton locomotives operating in Europe already had a much needed windshield giving some protection to the footplate area. Some other early locomotives were even fitted with a cab as part of a rebuilding program, an example being the locomotive John Bull.

In Germany, the locomotive cab was introduced by the Saxon railway director and writer Max Maria von Weber. However, until 1950 the railway directorates of the German-speaking countries continued to believe that a standing posture was essential to maximise crew vigilance. Steam locomotive drivers, who had to lean out of their cabs for better visibility, therefore frequently developed occupational diseases, along with rheumatism, and electric locomotive drivers suffered from wear to the knees.

This unsatisfactory situation changed—with few exceptions—only with the construction of the German standard electric locomotives, which for the first time were equipped with crew seats. Meanwhile, the maintenance of crew vigilance became possible by technical means through the use of Sifa devices.

== See also ==
- Boxcab – Type of locomotive
- Cab unit
- Cockpit – Room from which a pilot controls an aircraft or spacecraft
- Control car – Unpowered railway or tramway car with a driver's cab
- Control stand – Diesel-electric locomotive subsystem which integrates engine functional controls
- Driving Van Trailer – British control car
- Footplate
- Push–pull train
- Short hood – Shorter of the two hoods on a locomotive
- Steeplecab
