= German submarine U-33 =

U-33 may refer to one of the following German submarines:

- SM U-33 (Germany), was a Type U 31 submarine launched in 1914 and that served in the First World War until surrendered on 16 January 1919
  - During the First World War, Germany also had these submarines with similar names:
    - SM UB-33, a Type UB II submarine launched in 1915 and sunk on 11 April 1918
    - SM UC-33, a Type UC II submarine launched in 1916 and sunk on 26 September 1917
- German submarine U-33 (1936), a Type VIIA submarine that served in the Second World War until sunk on 12 February 1940
- German submarine U-33 (S183), a Type 212 submarine of the Bundesmarine that was launched in 2004 and in active service
