= EMD DDA40X =

Model of diesel–electric locomotive

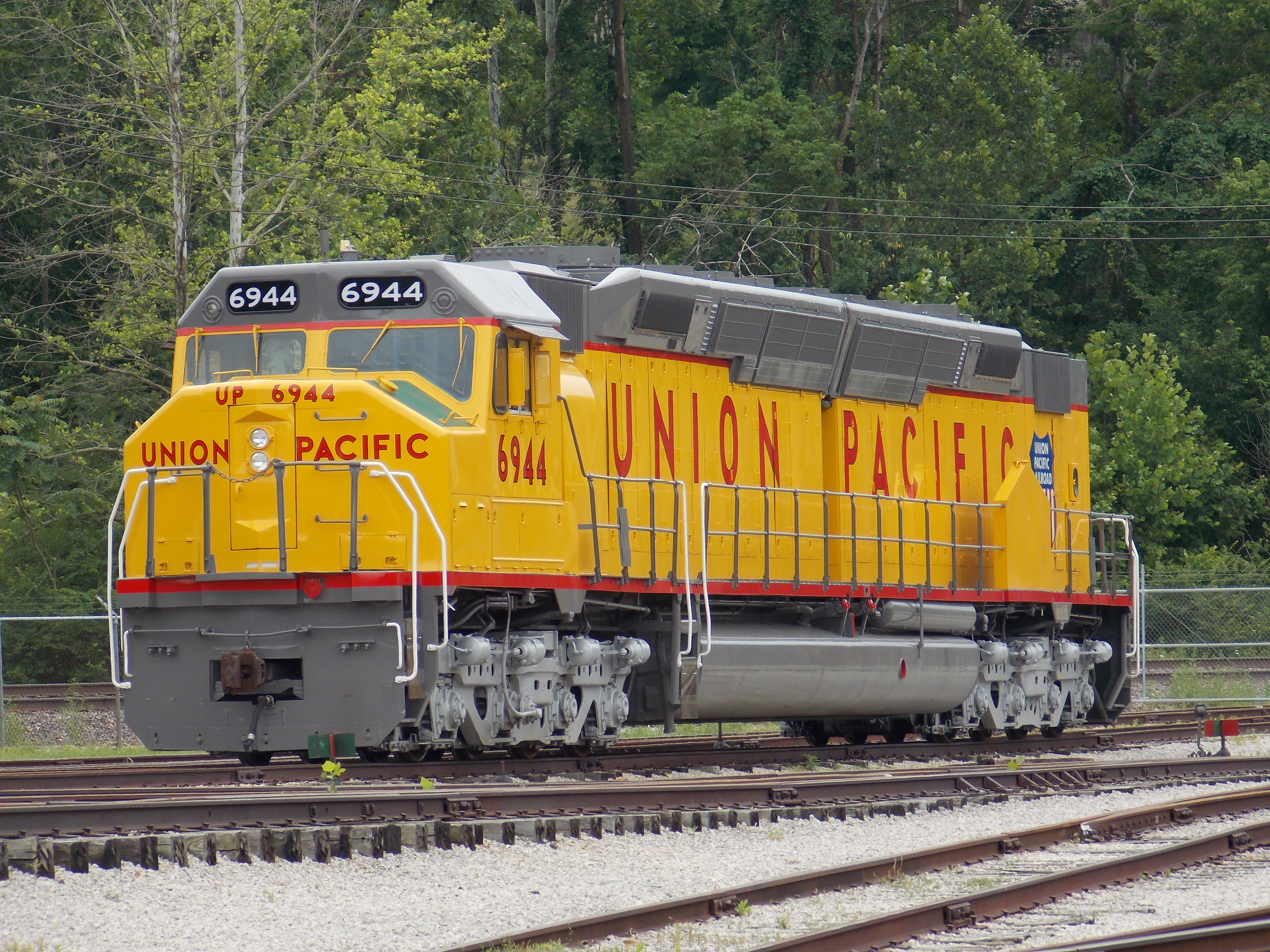
- Union Pacific DDA40X 6944 at the National Museum of Transportation in Kirkwood, Missouri.
Type and origin
- Power type: Diesel–electric
- Builder: General Motors Electro-Motive Division (EMD)
- Order number: 7134-1 – 7134-25; 7198-1 – 7198-22
- Serial number: 34526–34550; 35499–35520
- Build date: January 1969 – September 1971
- Total produced: 47
Specifications
- Configuration
  - AAR: D-D
  - UIC: Do'Do'
- Gauge: 4 ft 8 1/2 in (1,435 mm)
- Trucks: 2 × 8 wheel Flexcoil
- Wheel diameter: 40 in (1,016 mm)
- Minimum curve: 57°
- Wheelbase
  - Engine: 82 ft 1 1/2 in (25.03 m)
  - Truck: 17 ft 1 in (5.21 m)
- Length
  - Over couplers: 98 ft 5 in (30.00 m)
- Width: 10 ft 3 in (3.12 m)
- Height: 16 ft 4 in (4.98 m)
- Empty weight: 521,980 lb (236,766 kg; 261 short tons; 237 t)
- Service weight: 545,453 lb (247,413 kg; 273 short tons; 247 t)
- Fuel type: Diesel fuel
- Fuel capacity: 8,200 US gal (31,000 L; 6,800 imp gal)
- Lubricant cap.: 610 US gal (2,300 L; 510 imp gal)
- Coolant cap.: 600 US gal (2,300 L; 500 imp gal)
- Sandbox cap.: 53 cu ft (1.5 m^{3})
- Prime mover: 2 × 16-645 E3A
- Engine type: 2-stroke diesel
- Aspiration: Turbocharged
- Displacement: 10,320 cu in (169,100 cm^{3})
- Alternator: 2 × Delco A8102
- Generator: 2 × GM - AR12
- Traction motors: 8 × GM - D77
- Gear ratio: 59:18
- Train brakes: Westinghouse 26L air brakes and extended range dynamic braking
- Safety systems: Leslie Supertyfon model S-5T-RF or S3LR horns, US&S Type 'EL' Cab Signals (6936 equipped with US&S MicroCab ATC & CCS)
- Couplers: Type 'E'
Performance figures
- Maximum speed: 80–90 mph (129–145 km/h)
- Power output: 6,600 hp (4,922 kW)
- Tractive effort
  - Starting: 113,940 lbf (506,830 N) at 25%
  - Continuous: 103,000 lbf (458,167 N) at 12 mph (19 km/h)
Career
- Operators: Union Pacific
- Number in class: 47
- Numbers: 6900 – 6946
- Nicknames: "Centennial"
- Delivered: 6900-6924 April – December 1969; 6925-6946 June 1970 – September 1971
- Preserved: 12 in museums (1 operational), 1 pending disposition
- Disposition: 34 scrapped

The EMD DDA40X is a 6,600 hp (4,922 kW) D-D locomotive, built by EMD from 1969 to 1971, exclusively for the Union Pacific Railroad. It is the most powerful diesel–electric locomotive model ever built on a single frame, having two 16-645E3A diesel prime movers. Union Pacific has marked DD40X on the cab exteriors, while EMD literature inconsistently refers to this model as either DD-40X or DDA40X.

UP's DDA40X locomotives were the culmination of the company's experiments with extremely powerful locomotives that began with its gas turbine–electric locomotives and DD35s. For manufacturer EMD, the construction of the world's most powerful single frame locomotive was a sign of the company's dominance of the North American diesel locomotive market, with only GE Transportation an equal competitor. The DDA40X also pioneered a number of new technologies that would go on to be incorporated in future EMD designs.

UP did not continue with exceptionally powerful locomotives like the DDA40X built on single frames, instead moving toward distributed power using smaller locomotives closer to 4,000 hp (3,000 kW). All DDA40X locomotives were retired between 1984 and 1986; several of them survive. Union Pacific 6936 operated as a member of the Union Pacific Heritage Fleet until 2022, when it was announced it would be donated to the Railroading Heritage of Midwest America.

== History ==
In 1969, Union Pacific was retiring the last of their gas turbine–electric locomotives. Beginning in 1963, Union Pacific had ordered DD35s and DD35As to replace the turbines, and the DDA40X was a further development from this design.

The first DDA40X, UP 6900, was delivered in April 1969, in time for the centenary celebration of the first transcontinental railroad's completion, driving the "Gold Spike Limited"; it arrived in Salt Lake City, Utah, on the morning of May 10. In honor of this, the class was nicknamed Centennials and the choice of locomotive numbers in the 6900s was made for the same reason. Forty-six more were built between June 1969 and September 1971, numbered from 6901 to 6946.

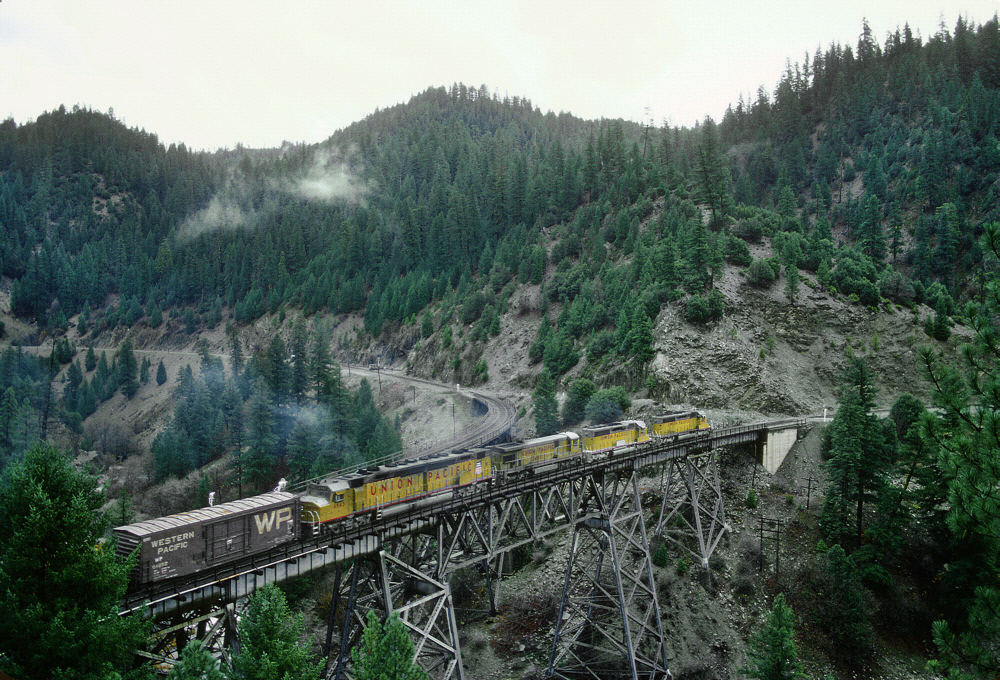
DDA40X 6943, behind GE C30-7 2400, demonstrating its comparative length on the Keddie Wye of the Feather River Route in 1984.

The DDA40X is 98 ft 5 in (30.00 m) long. The frames were fabricated by the John Mohr Company of Chicago, because they were too large for EMD's factory. The use of more than one prime mover in a single locomotive was not new; the E-series were popular dual-engine locomotives, and Baldwin had produced, but not sold, a locomotive with four diesel engines.

The X in the model number stood for experimental, as DDA40X Centennials were testbeds for technology that would go into future EMD products. The modular electronic control systems later used in EMD Dash-2 models were first used on the DDA40X and the 4,200 hp (3,132 kW) SD45X. All DDA40X units included a new load test circuit, whose dynamic braking resistors allowed units to load test without a track-side load test box. Gearing was 59:18, allowing 90 mph (145 km/h) on freight trains.

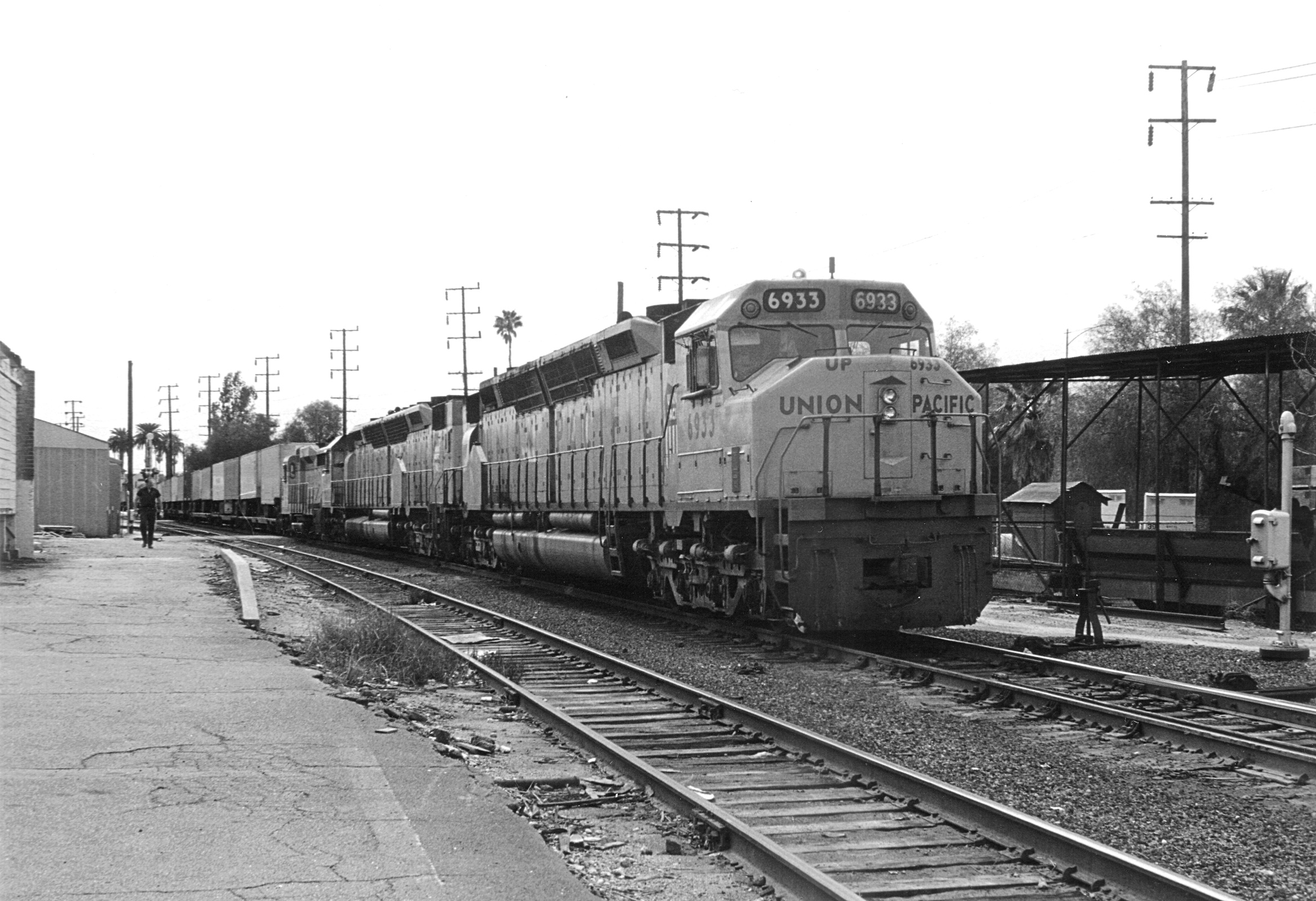
Union Pacific 6933, with another DDA40X and a GP30, hauls a TOFC train through Riverside, California in March 1979.

The DDA40X has a wide nose akin to those on the F45 and FP45 cowl units. These cabs were superficially similar to the Canadian comfort cab introduced by Canadian National in 1973, though without the structural reinforcements of the Canadian design.

Other experiments were conducted during the service life of these locomotives. A few of the units were fitted with Federal Signal Thunderbolt air raid sirens to warn track-side personnel when away from grade crossings, but the results were inconclusive. Another test included the modular electrical components, which was successful. This made for easier diagnosis of electrical problems. These modifications were used in all future locomotives built by EMD.

Union Pacific frequently used these locomotives to haul heavy freights, and each unit ran about two million miles (3,200,000 km) over its service life. Despite their excellent performance and relatively good efficiency, the units were increasingly costly to maintain, which ultimately prompted Union Pacific to begin placing them into storage in the early 1980s. In February 1984, as rail traffic rebounded, Union Pacific brought 25 units out of storage and rebuilt them to return to service. All locomotives were finally retired by 1986.

Twelve DDA40X units are preserved by various museums, while another unit survives as a source of spare parts for other locomotives. UP 6936, the sole operating unit, was owned by Union Pacific and was used in excursion service until 2016. In 2022, this locomotive was donated by Union Pacific to the Railroading Heritage of Midwest America, which returned the locomotive to operation. 6936 was operated by the museum for the first time in August 2023.

== Accidents and incidents ==
Two DDA40X units were retired during regular service due to wreck damage.

- On April 6, 1974, 6903 and 6924 were heading downhill on Cajon Pass with a freight train when the train rear ended an ATSF freight train on Sullivan's Curve. The UP brakeman was killed while the UP engineer and conductor as well as the rear ATSF crew were injured. 6903 was written off from the roster and scrapped in Lake Point, Utah due to heavy damage, while 6924 was repaired and returned to service.
- In June 1978, 6940 was wrecked in Peru, Wyoming. The unit was later repaired and put back into service.
- On August 28, 1978, 6921 and 6937 were wrecked at Point of Rocks, Wyoming, and severely damaged. The remains of 6921 were moved to Salt Lake City, Utah, for parts and later scrapped in Ogden in 1979, while 6937 was repaired and returned to service that same year.
- On the evening of November 28, 1980, 6909 derailed in a yard at Commerce, California, while it was being switched with other locomotives. The locomotive's weight turned over the rail in a curve, causing the whole unit to derail on both ends. The unit was rerailed the next morning and repaired, but was later put into storage.
- On November 30, 2000, 6936 collided with a dump truck at a railroad crossing in Livonia, Louisiana, killing the dump truck driver and a railroad employee riding in the nose section. The unit was later repaired at North Little Rock, Arkansas with a reinforced nose.

== Surviving examples ==
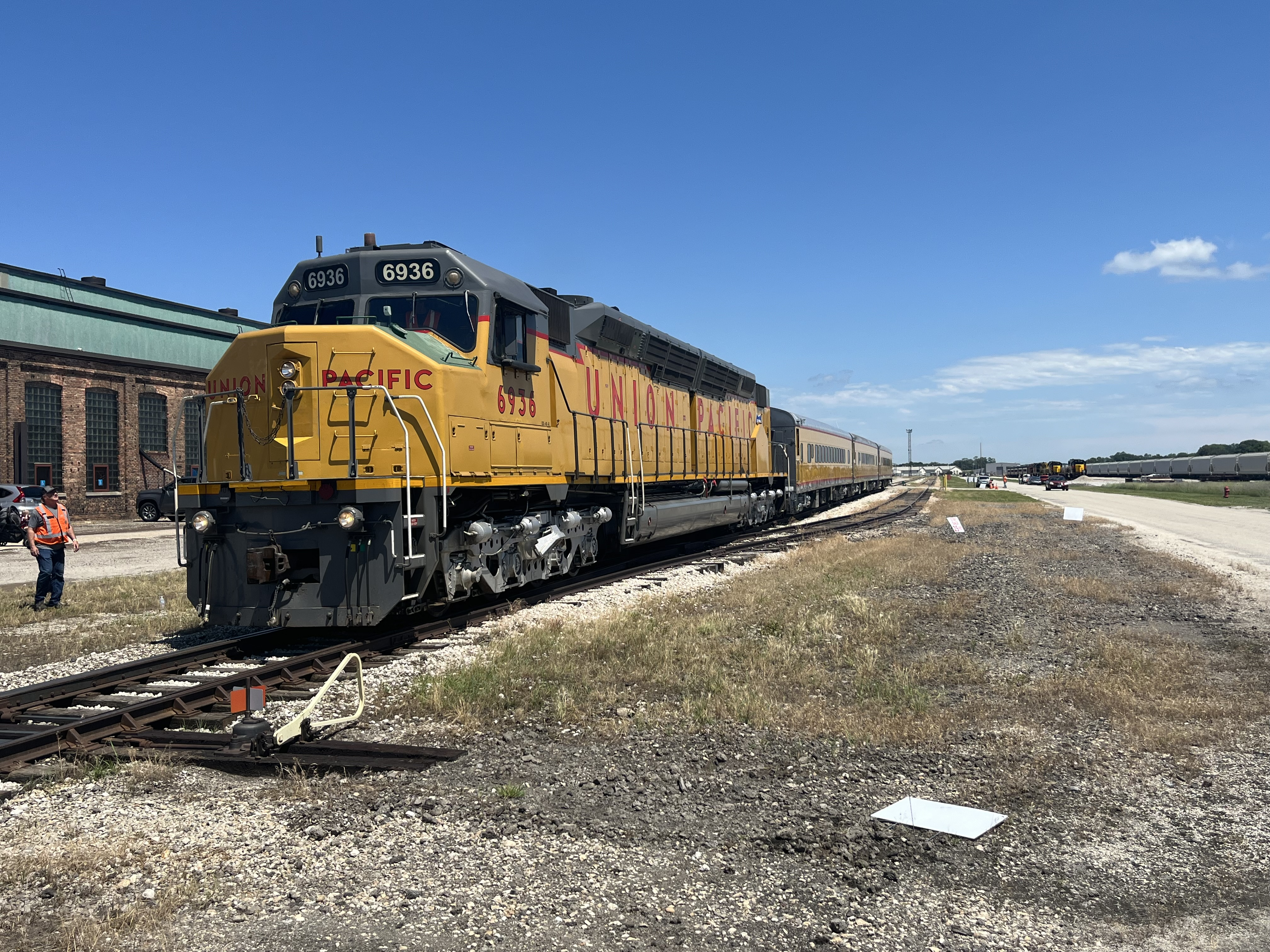
Union Pacific 6936 at the Railroading Heritage of Midwest America in Silvis, Illinois.

Thirteen DDA40Xs survive today. The following list details the surviving locomotives and their current owners.

- 6900 – Kenefick Park, Omaha, Nebraska. The first DDA40X built, it was moved to its current location on April 15, 2005.
- 6901 – Ross Park, Pocatello, Idaho.
- 6911 – Mexico Museum of Technology, Mexico City.
- 6913 – Museum of the American Railroad, Frisco, Texas.
- 6915 – RailGiants Train Museum, Fairplex, Pomona, California.
- 6916 – Utah State Railroad Museum, Ogden, Utah.
- 6922 – Cody Park, North Platte, Nebraska.
- 6925 – Stored at Ringneck and Western Railroad, LLC's rail yard located in Kimball, South Dakota, having been used as a parts source. Previously owned by the Nebraska Railroad Museum until October 2022, now owned by the Midwest Overland Rail Preservation Society.
- 6930 – Illinois Railway Museum, Union, Illinois. Originally donated to Smoky Hill Railway & Historical Society (Kansas City area); traded and moved to the IRM in 1991. Currently under restoration to operating condition.
- 6936 – Railroading Heritage of Midwest America, Silvis, Illinois. Previously operated as part of the UP Heritage Fleet until 2016. Operational.
- 6938 – North Little Rock, Arkansas. Sits in front of Jenks Locomotive Facility.
- 6944 – National Museum of Transportation, St. Louis, Missouri. No. 6944 was sent to Altoona, Pennsylvania in July 2014 for cosmetic restoration, which was completed in May 2015. The locomotive returned to St. Louis in June 2015.
- 6946 – Western Pacific Railroad Museum, Portola, California. The last DDA40X built, it is fairly complete and on static display.

== In popular culture ==
A scale model of DDA40X No. 6915 was featured in the 1995 music video for the song "Big Train" by Mike Watt, directed by Spike Jonze, and it was part of Watt's 1995 studio album Ball-Hog or Tugboat?. In the video, No. 6915 was driven by Mike Watt as a drunk engineer, who threw bombs off of the locomotive and used it to run over pedestrians. Union Pacific was agitated by the use of No. 6915 in the video, since an estimated 529 trespassers had been run over and killed by American trains throughout the previous year. In April 1995, the railroad successfully sued the video's producers, MTV, Sony Music, and Satellite Films, for copyright infringement.

== See also ==
- EMD DD35
- EMD DD35A
- EMD DDM45
- EMD SD90MAC
- ALCO Century 855
