= GE U33B =

Diesel-electric locomotive

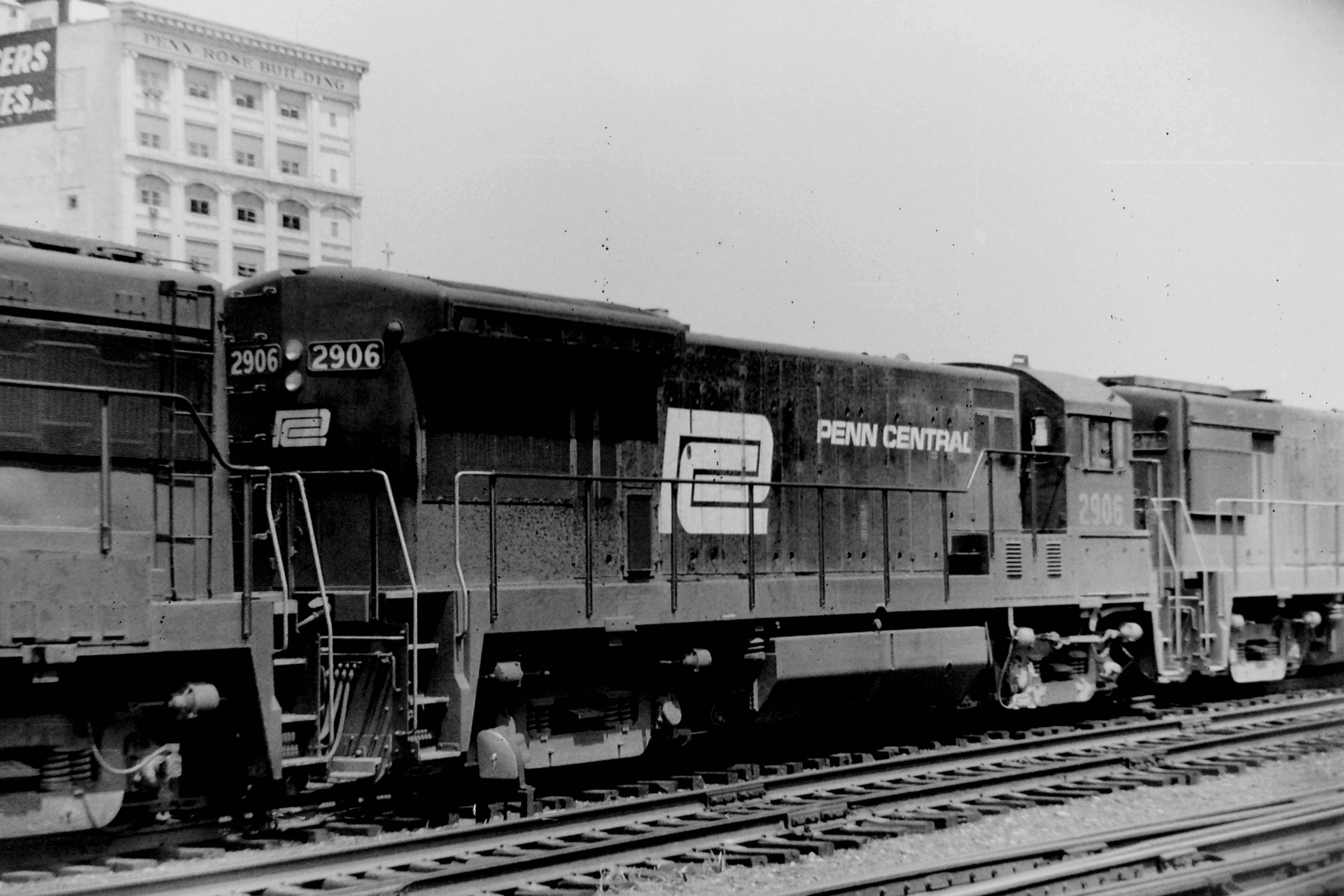
- Penn Central #2906 with a freight train in Pittsburgh, Pennsylvania in 1970.
Type and origin
- Power type: Diesel-electric
- Builder: GE Transportation Systems
- Model: U33B
- Build date: December 1966 – June 1970
- Total produced: 137
Specifications
- Configuration
  - AAR: B-B
- Gauge: 4 ft 8 1/2 in (1,435 mm) standard gauge
- Length: 60 ft 2 in (18.34 m)
- Prime mover: GE FDL-16
- Engine type: V16 diesel
- Cylinders: 16
Performance figures
- Maximum speed: 70 mph
- Power output: 3,300 hp (2,500 kW)
Career
- Disposition: All scrapped

The GE U33B was a diesel-electric locomotive that was offered by GE between 1966 and 1970, featuring a 16-cylinder motor. It is part of the GE Universal Series It is 60 ft 2 in (18.34 m) long. From the U30B, the U33B gave an additional 300 horsepower to the traction motors. In doing so, a larger rear radiator assembly was required. This "winged" look became a trademark of GE locomotives, and continues today under successor Wabtec Freight. The units were distinguished by their wider rear radiators, needed to support the higher horsepower output. It was dubbed the "U-Boat" at the time it was released.

== Original owners ==
Image	Railroad	Quantity	Numbers	Notes
	Chicago, Rock Island and Pacific Railroad (Rock Island)	25	190-199, 285-299	
	New York Central Railroad	2	2858–2859	downrated to 3000 hp, to Penn Central, Conrail 2858-2859
	Penn Central	81	2890–2970	to Conrail 2890-2970
	Seaboard Coast Line Railroad	29	1719–1747	Blomberg trucks

== Bibliography ==
- Trzoniec, Stanley W. (2015). Vintage & Modern Diesel Locomotives: Prime Movers of America. Voyageur Press. ISBN 9780760348406 – via Google Books.
