= GE U33C =

6-axle diesel-electric locomotive

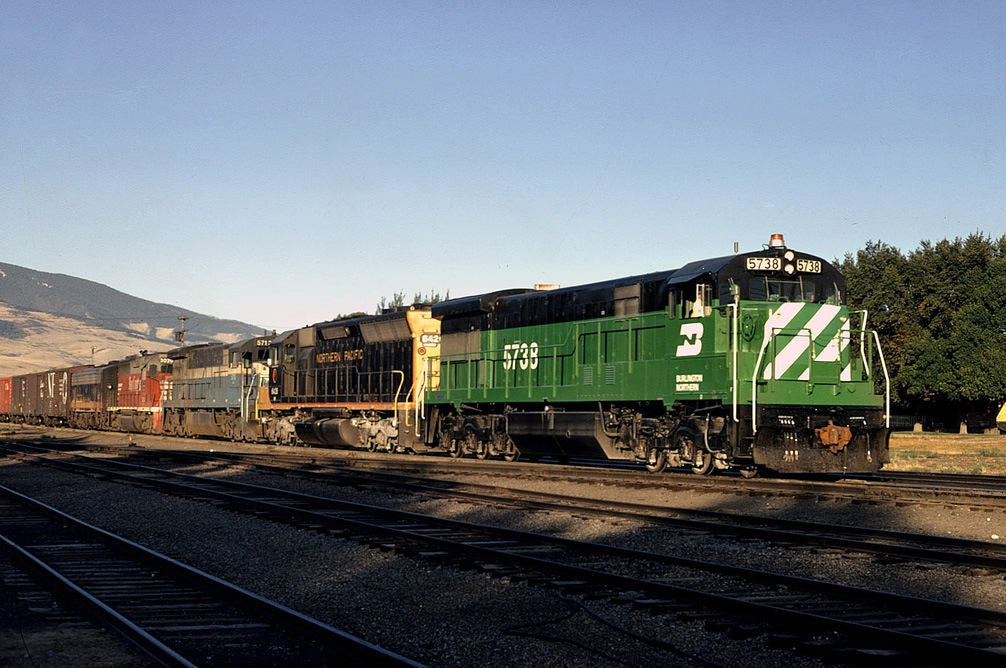
- BN #5738 leads a freight train through Livingston, Montana.
Type and origin
- Power type: Diesel-electric
- Builder: GE Transportation Systems
- Model: U33C
- Build date: January 1968 – January 1975
- Total produced: 375
Specifications
- Configuration
  - AAR: C-C
- Gauge: 4 ft 8 1/2 in (1,435 mm) standard gauge
- Prime mover: GE FDL-16
- Cylinders: 16
Performance figures
- Power output: 3,300 hp (2.5 MW)
Career
- Locale: North America
- Disposition: Most scrapped, three units heavily rebuilt and exported to China.

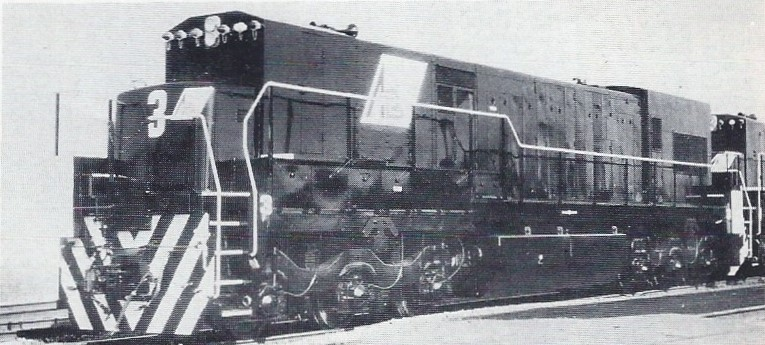
One of the units rebuilt for use in China.

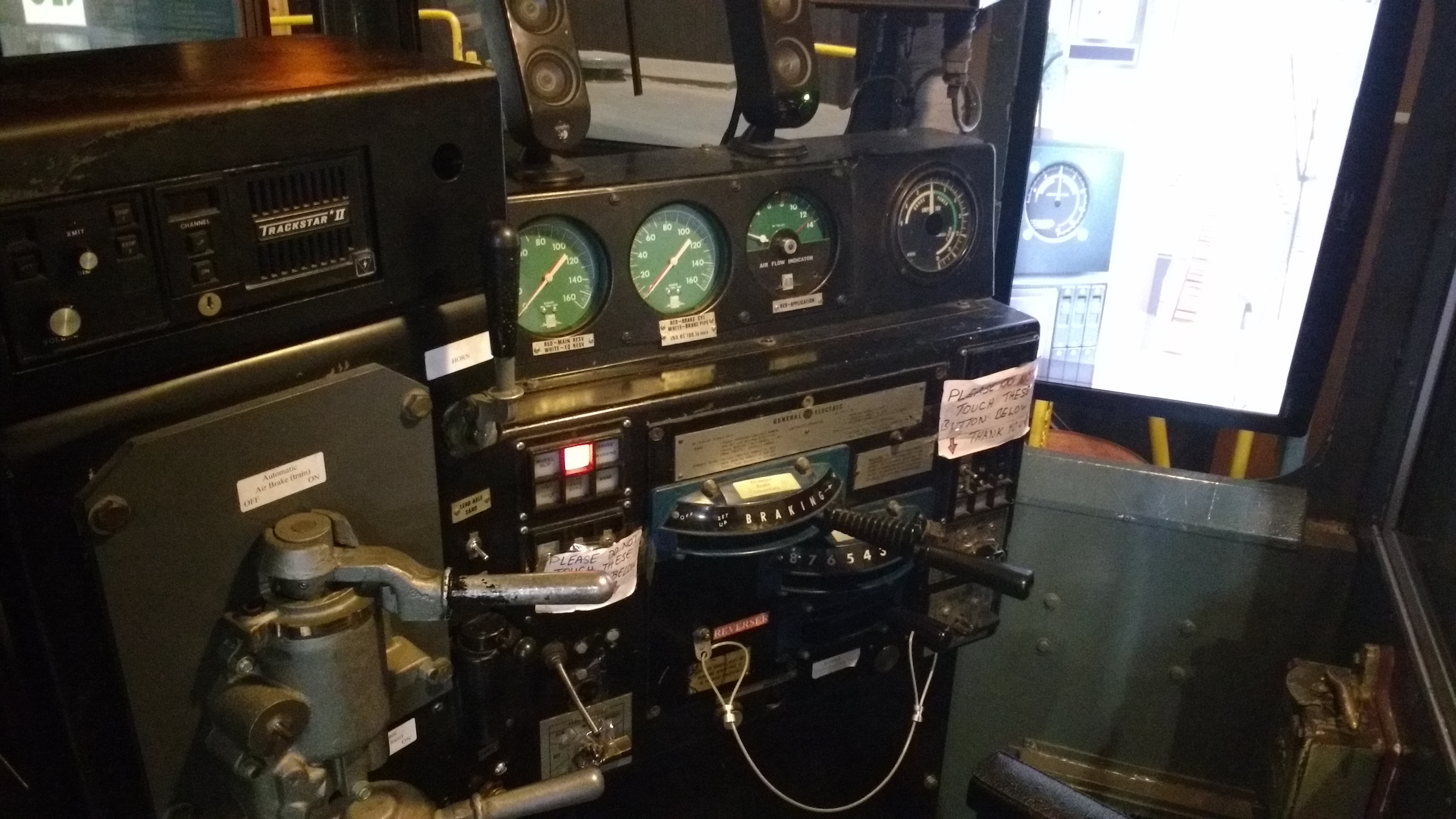
U33C control cab on display at the Toronto Railway Museum.

The GE U33C is a 6-axle diesel-electric locomotive built by GE Transportation Systems between January 1968 and January 1975. 375 examples of this locomotive were built for 11 North American railroads and one construction contractor.

== Original owners ==
A cab built from numerous GE locomotive parts representing D&H #757 is preserved at the Toronto Railway Museum and is currently in use as a locomotive simulator.
