= Span bolster =

Tool used in railway engineering

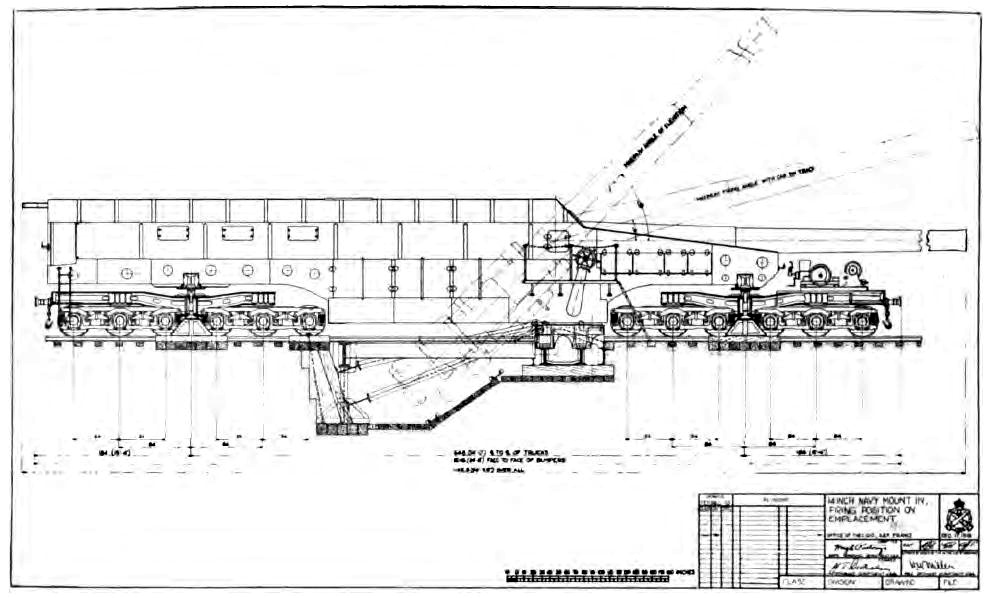
Span bolsters can be seen at both ends of this diagram of the 14"/50 caliber railway gun.

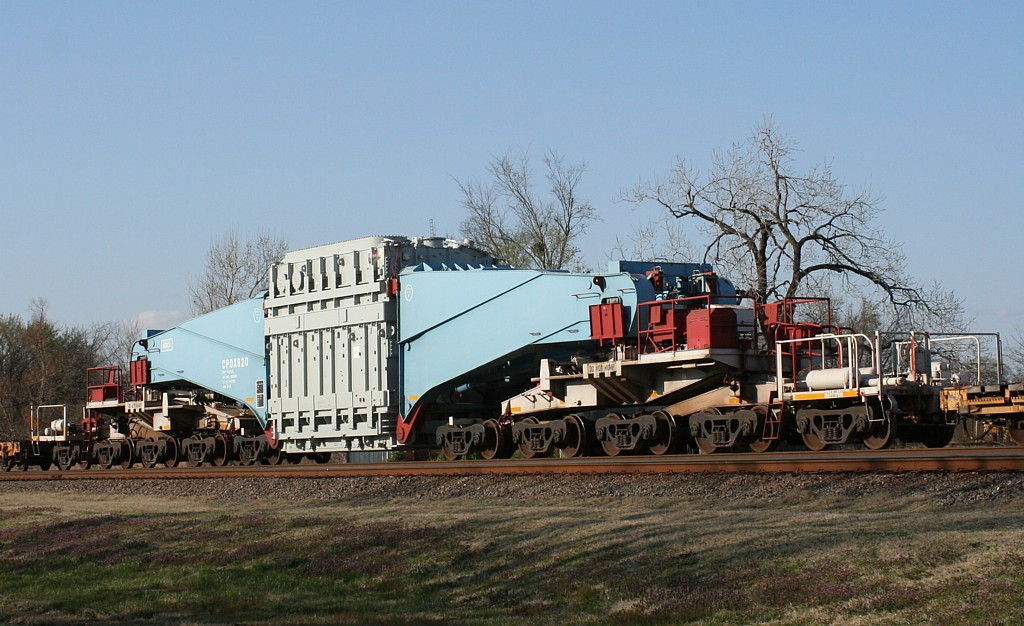
Span bolsters (white/orange) in a Schnabel car

A span bolster, in rail terminology, is a beam or frame used to link two trucks (US), or bogies (UK), so that they can be articulated together and be joined to the locomotive or railroad car at one rotating mounting point. In effect, they make one "super-truck" out of the two, while permitting each truck to move relative to the other.

== Use ==
=== Locomotives ===
The most common use on locomotives is to give a more flexible alternative to a four-axle truck; two two-axle trucks linked by a span bolster allows the wheels to follow a curve better, without excessive side forces or the need for lateral motion of the axles in the truck. The use of a span bolster is normally signified in the AAR wheel arrangement notation by a + sign; thus a locomotive with two span bolsters, each with two two-axle trucks (the most common arrangement) is a B+B-B+B.

=== Freight cars ===
Span bolsters have been used for some high-capacity freight cars. The most common use is for large flatcars to haul very heavy loads. These cars need many axles to distribute the weight. Specialized Schnabel cars with up to 72 wheels have been built for carrying heavy items. Often the span bolsters connecting the trucks are connected by additional span bolsters to the car. The use of span-bolster-connected trucks is essential to allow the load to be transported through curves.

== See also ==
- Whippletree (mechanism)
