= GE Dash 9-40CW =

Norfolk Southern

GE C40-9W
- A trio of Norfolk Southern Dash 9-40CWs with no. 9301 leading. All 3 rebuilt as AC44C6Ms.
Type and origin
- Power type: Diesel–electric
- Builder: GE Transportation
- Model: GE Dash 9-40CW
- Build date: January 1996 – December 2004
- Total produced: 1,090
- Rebuilder: GE Transportation
- Number rebuilt: est. over 800
Specifications
- Configuration
  - AAR: C-C
  - UIC: Co'Co'
- Gauge: 4 ft 8 1/2 in (1,435 mm) standard gauge
- Trucks: Hi-Adhesion C-C 6-Wheel
- Wheel diameter: 40 in (1,000 mm)
- Minimum curve: 23°
- Wheelbase: 13 ft 7 in (4.14 m)
- Pivot centres: 57 ft 3 in (17.45 m)
- Length: 73 ft 2 in (22.30 m)
- Width: 10 ft 3.5 in (3.137 m)
- Height: 15 ft 4.5 in (4.686 m)
- Loco weight: 340,000 lb (150,000 kg) or 170 short tons (150 long tons; 150 t)
- Fuel capacity: 4,600 US gal (17,000 L; 3,800 imp gal)
- Lubricant cap.: 410 US gal (1,600 L; 340 imp gal)
- Coolant cap.: 400 US gal (1,500 L; 330 imp gal)
- Sandbox cap.: 40 ft^{3} (1,100 L)
- Prime mover: GE 7FDL-16
- RPM
  - RPM idle: 450
  - Maximum RPM: 1050
- Alternator: GY27
- Generator: Main: GE - GMG186; Auxiliary: GY27
- Traction motors: GE B13B (6)
- Cylinder size: 9 in (230 mm) x 10.5 in (270 mm)
- Gear ratio: 83:20
- MU working: Yes
- Train brakes: Westinghouse 26L (Air Brake)
Performance figures
- Maximum speed: 70 mph (110 km/h)
- Power output: 4,000 hp (3,000 kW) (Original) 4,400 hp (3,300 kW) (Uprated)
- Tractive effort
  - Starting: 140,000 lbf (64,000 kgf) @25%
  - Continuous: 109,000 lbf (49,000 kgf) @18.3 mph (29.5 km/h)
Career
- Locale: Norfolk Southern (Dash 9-40CW) CSX Transportation (Dash 8-44CW)
- Disposition: NS units upgraded to and reclassified as Dash 9-44CW. All will be rebuilt as AC44C6M.

The GE Dash 9-40CW is a 4,000-horsepower (3,000 kW) diesel-electric locomotive built by GE Transportation Systems of Erie, Pennsylvania, between January 1996 and December 2004. 1,090 were built for Norfolk Southern Railway, as road numbers 8889 to 9978. 53 GE Dash 8-44CWs built to Dash 9 specifications were also built for CSX Transportation, carrying road numbers 9000 to 9052.

Part of GE's "Dash 9" series of locomotives, the Dash 9-40CW shares its frame, HiAd trucks, 16-cylinder 7FDL engine, and 752AH-31 traction motors with the GE Dash 9-44CW. But while the more common 9-44CW offers 4,400 horsepower (3,300 kW), software in the 9-40CW's engine-governing unit restricts its power output to 4,000 horsepower (3,000 kW), although the engineer can override this restriction when desired. The Dash 9-40CW was basically an extension of the previous order for the standard cab GE Dash 9-40C, built under the same premise that a lower power rating would prolong the life of the engine and use less fuel.

Early production units built for CSX were designed with carbodies externally identical to the predecessor Dash 8-40CW with the first three units of the series also being built on Dash 8-40CW frames, and were designated C44-8W originally, as they were built as 4400 horsepower units before being downrated to 4000 horsepower. The CSX units were equipped with GSC ''Floating Bolster'' 3 Trucks instead of the standard Hi-ad trucks commonly found on later models.

In 2005, GE replaced the C40-9W in its locomotive catalog with the Evolution Series model, the ES40DC. Like the Dash 9-40CWs, Norfolk Southern's ES40DC locomotives are rated at 4,000 hp (3,000 kW) to conserve fuel. The change in output is accomplished electronically; mechanically, the two models are essentially the same. In 2015, Norfolk Southern begun a rebuilding program to rebuild its C40-9Ws as AC44C6Ms, that is still ongoing as of October 2026.

== BB40-9W ==
GE also produced a narrow-gauge version of the Dash 9-40CW, known as the BB40-9W. They are equipped with four type B trucks, two at each end replacing the conventional type C trucks. This is necessary because EFVM tracks are 1,000 mm (3 ft 3 3/8 in) narrow gauge. Unlike the North American axle load limit of 71,500 lb (32.4 tonnes) on standard gauge railways, the narrow gauge railway over which the units operate allows only 51190 lb (25 tonnes). The units are numbered 8300-8315 in ALL (América Latina Logística); 6020-6050, 6095-6099, 6175-6191, 8667-8688, and 8789-8794 in VL! Logística; 9577-9579 in Brado Logística; 1113-1311 in EFVM.
