= GE Dash 9-40C =

Diesel locomotive

- Norfolk Southern C40-9 no. 8803, which has since been rebuilt as an AC44C6M no. 4088
Type and origin
- Power type: Diesel-electric
- Builder: GE Transportation Systems
- Model: GE Dash 9-40C
- Build date: January–April 1995
- Total produced: 125
Specifications
- Configuration
  - AAR: C-C
  - UIC: Co'Co'
- Gauge: 4 ft 8 1/2 in (1,435 mm) standard gauge
- Trucks: GE HiAd
- Wheel diameter: 40 in (1,000 mm)
- Wheelbase: 13 ft 7 in (4.14 m)
- Length: 73 ft 2 in (22.30 m)
- Loco weight: 410,000 lb (190 t), full supplies - (fuel oil, lube oil, sand).
- Fuel capacity: 4,600 US gal (17 kL)
- Lubricant cap.: 410 US gal (1.6 kL)
- Sandbox cap.: 40 cu ft (1.1 m^{3})
- Prime mover: GE 7FDL-16
- Traction motors: direct-current GE B13B
Performance figures
- Maximum speed: 70 mph (110 km/h)
- Power output: 4,000 hp (3,000 kW)
- Tractive effort: 109,000 lbf (480 kN) (continuous); 140,000 lbf (620 kN) (starting)
Career
- Operators: Norfolk Southern Railway
- Nicknames: Top Hats
- Locale: United States
- Retired: 2015 - 2018
- Disposition: All rebuilt as AC44C6M, one scrapped, one cab reused for a switcher at GE's Erie Plant

The GE Dash 9-40C, also called a C40-9, was a 4,000-horsepower (3,000 kW) diesel locomotive that was built by GE Transportation Systems of Erie, Pennsylvania, between January 1995 and March 1995. The C40-9 was equipped with the 16-cylinder 7FDL-16 prime mover which is rated at a lower power than the 4,400 hp (3,300 kW) GE Dash 9-44CW that debuted a year earlier in 1994. It featured GE's direct current B13B traction motors.

The C40-9 featured the standard cab design and was the only model in the Dash-9 series to do so. It was essentially identical to the wide-cab C40-9W model otherwise. All units had rooftop-mounted air conditioner units which gave them their distinct "top hat" look.

Norfolk Southern Railway (NS) was the sole operator of this model. The company owned 125 units, numbered 8764–8888. NS specifically requested the standard cab and would have purchased more units had GE Transportation not standardized its production lines on the North American safety cab, thus NS had to purchase the wide-cab C40-9W version instead.

== Upgrade ==
In mid 2015, NS upgraded the C40-9s into 4400 hp C44-9s. The wattage was increased to 3,281 kW, up from the as-delivered 3,000 kW. The units were upgraded as they went through their 184-day maintenance cycle.

Also in 2015, NS 8799 became the first NS GE Dash 9-40C to be rebuilt as an AC44C6M. The locomotive was rebuilt with a new GE wide nose and cab and had locomotive speed limiter (LSL) and cab signals installed. These traction motor replacements are part of a Norfolk Southern / General Electric project to test the economic feasibility of converting Norfolk Southern's large (125 units), but relatively old Dash 9 fleet to AC traction. (BNSF Railway is also considering a similar upgrade program for its even bigger - originally 1797 units - C44-9W fleet). Work on the 8879 was sub-contracted out to and completed by American Motive Power, Inc. (AMP) in Dansville, NY. Two more units were soon added to the conversion program, NS C40-9 8799 and NS C40-9W 8900.

The final active C40-9 unit, 8806, was retired in October of 2018. By the end of 2018, all C40-9 units have been rebuilt as AC44C6Ms. With the exception of NS 8798, which was scrapped in 2018 following a head on collision.

== Surviving Remnant ==
The cab of Norfolk Southern #8808 would later be reused for a custom-built switcher at GE's Erie plant in Erie, Pennsylvania. It's still in service today, as the sole remaining piece of the Dash 9-40C.

== See also ==
- National Rail NR class (model Cv40-9i)
