= GE AC44C6M =

Diesel-electric locomotive

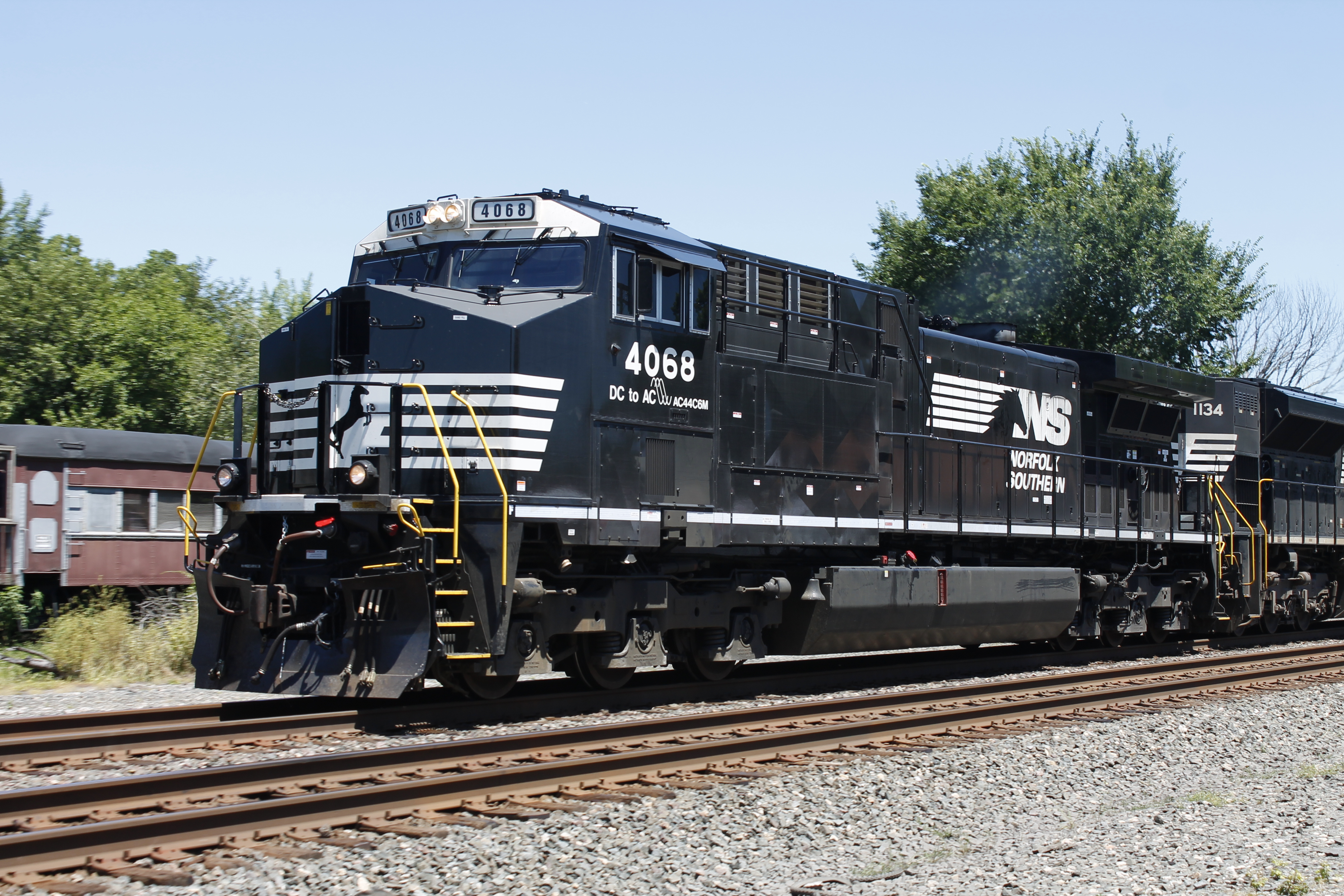
- Norfolk Southern GE AC44C6M no. 4068 in Chesterton, Indiana
Type and origin
- Power type: Diesel-electric
- Builder: GE Transportation Systems; American Motive Power; Norfolk Southern
- Model: AC44C6M, AC44C4M, C44ACM, CM44AC, CM44AH, AC4400CWM, AC44C6CF
- Build date: August 2015-present
- Total produced: Over 1000 (October 2025)
Specifications
- Configuration
  - AAR: C-C; A1A-A1A (AC44C4M only)
  - UIC: Co'Co' (A1A)(A1A) (AC44C4M only)
  - Commonwealth: Co-Co; A1A-A1A (AC44C4M only)
- Gauge: 4 ft 8 1/2 in (1,435 mm)
- Trucks: GE Hi-Ad
- Wheel diameter: 40 in (1,000 mm)
- Wheelbase: 13 ft 7 in (4.14 m)
- Length: 73 ft 2 in (22.30 m)
- Loco weight: 432,000 lb (196 t), full supplies - (fuel oil, lube oil, sand).
- Fuel capacity: 4,600 US gal (17 kL)
- Lubricant cap.: 410 US gal (1.6 kL)
- Sandbox cap.: 40 cu ft (1.1 m^{3})
- Prime mover: GE 7FDL-16
- Engine type: V16 diesel engine
- Traction motors: GE 5GEB13B7 AC
- Transmission: Diesel-electric
Performance figures
- Maximum speed: 75 mph (121 km/h)
- Power output: 4,400 hp (3,300 kW)
- Tractive effort: 180,000 lbf (800 kN) (continuous); 200,000 lbf (890 kN) (starting)
Career
- Class: AC44C6M (NS, CN, Ferromex, QNS&L, Fortescue); AC44C4M (BNSF); C44ACM (UP); CM44AC, CM44AH (CSX); AC4400CWM (CPKC—formerly CP); AC44C6CF (NS)
- Locale: North America
- Current owner: Norfolk Southern, QNS&L, Fortescue, Canadian National, Ferromex, Union Pacific, CPKC, BNSF, CSX, Wabtec

The GE AC44C6M is an AC-traction 4,400-horsepower (3,300 kW) diesel locomotive rebuilt from Dash 9 (and sometimes AC4400CW) locomotives. AC44C6M rebuilds have been done by GE (now Wabtec), American Motive Power, and Norfolk Southern's Juniata and Roanoke Shops, starting in September 2015. The AC44C6M retains the 16-cylinder 7FDL-16 prime mover used in the core locomotive prior to rebuilding, but replaces the Dash 9's DC traction motors with alternating current GE 5GEB13B7 traction motors. Externally, Norfolk Southern's Dash 9-40Cs received new wide-nosed cabs, and all rebuilt locomotives have a new hood front section with a new inverter cabinet behind the cab, while retaining the underframe and engine and radiator compartments of the original Dash 9 units.

Rebuilding an old Dash 9 locomotive into an AC44C6M costs only 50-60% that of purchasing a brand new AC locomotive. Wabtec claims a 17% improvement in fuel efficiency, 30% improvement in reliability, and a 55% improvement in haulage capability.

== History ==
BNSF was the first railroad to order locomotive rebuilds with an order for 21 AC44C4Ms that were delivered in September 2015.

These were followed shortly by Norfolk Southern's AC44C6M's, which were first delivered at the end of 2015, and rebuilt from their Dash 9-40C locomotives. Norfolk Southern is the largest operator of the AC44C6M, with over 600 locomotives rebuilt as of 2022, and a further 330 by 2025. All of their Dash 9-40C units, and significant numbers of their Dash 9-40CW units have been rebuilt into AC44C6Ms. The railway plans to rebuild all of its remaining Dash 9–40CW units into AC44C6Ms. Norfolk Southern's AC44C6M locomotive features a new under-floor air conditioner, cab signals, LSL (Locomotive Speed Limiter), DPU systems, PTC, and ECP braking ability (on some units).

Quebec North Shore and Labrador Railway has 19 AC44C6M locomotives. These were rebuilt from former BNSF Dash 9 locomotives.

As at October 2024, Fortescue has 28 AC44C6Ms. These feature a larger radiator than other AC44C6M rebuilds.

Union Pacific also announced plans to rebuild 75 of its Dash 9 locomotives into AC locomotives, presumably AC44C6Ms, as part of a large order to rebuild much of their GE locomotive fleet. Union Pacific is a major customer of the similar AC4400CWM rebuild program. All of these locomotives are classified as C44ACM, which is similar to the C60AC (including convertibles) and C44AC rebuilds. All of the rebuilds use UP's new paint scheme that was introduced in late 2022.

Canadian National ordered 50 AC44C6Ms, and received the first one in October 2022. 60 more units were ordered in 2023 for a total of 110. In 2025, 11 more units were ordered, raising the total to 121.

In August 2023, Norfolk Southern acquired 36 AC4400CW locomotives from CEFX and were renumbered into 3964-3999 series. However, only 11 were rebuilt into AC44C6Ms, while 25 other units were sold to Wabtec and subsequently Ferromex.

CSX announced in February 2026 that Wabtec would rebuild 50 Dash 9 locomotives and convert them from DC to AC traction.

== Similar rebuilds ==
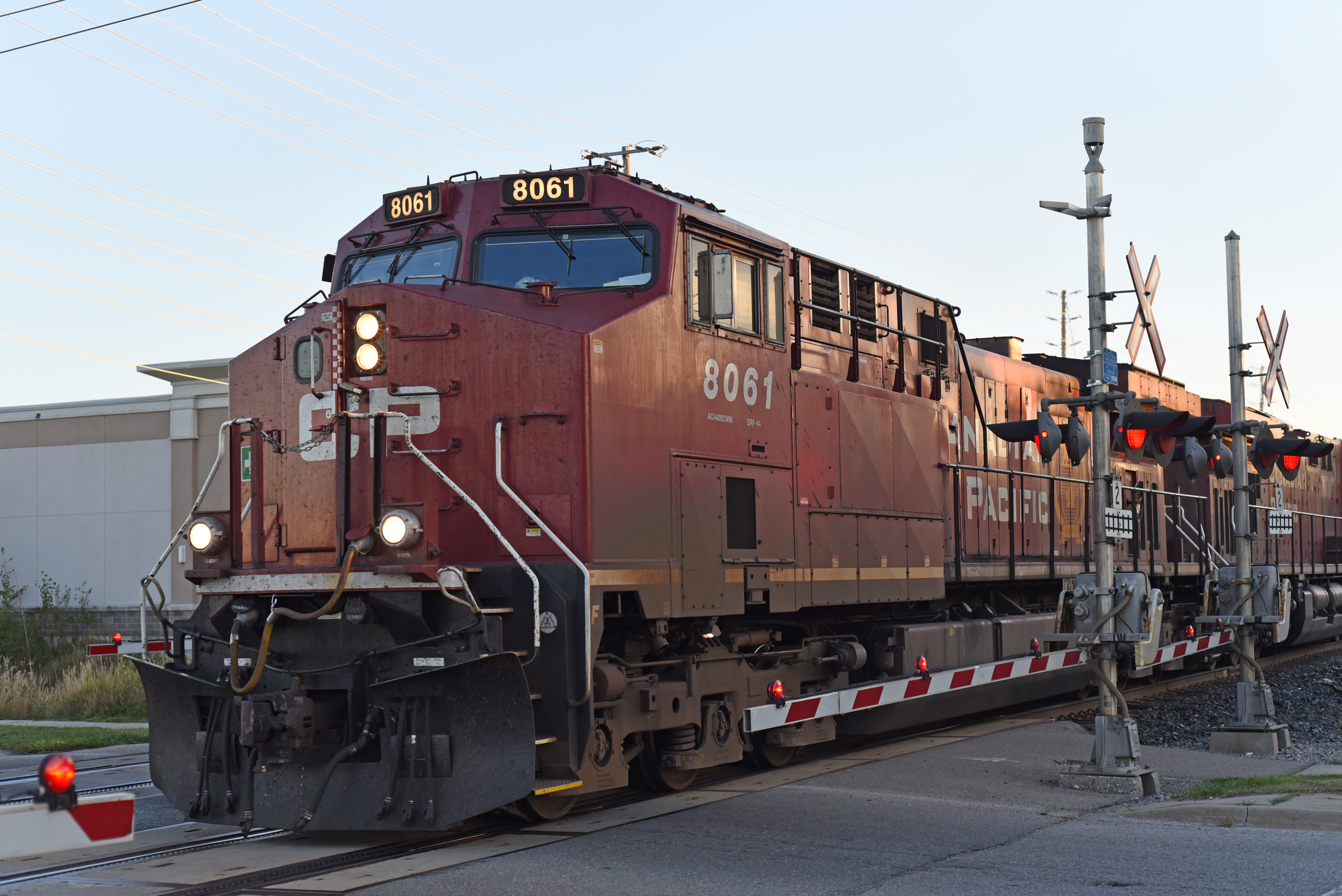
Canadian Pacific AC4400CWM no. 8061

=== AC4400CWM ===
The AC4400CWM is a similar rebuild program undertaken by GE/Wabtec, but starts with an AC4400CW or AC6000CW (UP only) instead of a Dash 9. Ferromex, Union Pacific, CSX, and CPKC have rebuilt several hundred AC4400CW into AC4400CWM models. Only CPKC classifies them as AC4400CWM, while CSX classifies as CM44AC/CM44AH and UP classifies as C44ACM.

=== AC44C4M ===
The AC44C4M is a rebuild similar to the AC44C6M, but AC44C4M locomotives feature 4 traction motors and an A1A-A1A configuration rather than the AC44C6M's 6-traction motors in a C-C configuration. This is similar to the ES44C4 and ET44C4 that BNSF also operates. These locomotives also retain their original cabs, with the exception of unit 616 as of 2025. BNSF has so far been the only customer of the AC44C4M, with 21 locomotives. They are numbered 599-615 and 617-619 and were formerly ATSF C44-9W units.

=== AC44C6CF ===
The AC44C6CF is a cheaper, experimental rebuild version of the AC44C6M. Norfolk Southern partnered with the Spanish company CAF to rebuild NS Dash 9 no. 8946 with CAF electricals, including AC traction motors, but still keeps its original cab. It was renumbered to no. 8520 and was sent for test on the Western New York and Pennsylvania Railroad. However, the locomotive frequently suffered from electrical and computer system problems and faulty control systems, forcing the unit to be stored for one month in Driftwood, Pennsylvania in August 2019, and then sent back to Altoona, Pennsylvania the next month. NS officially retired and sold the unit to Knoxville Locomotive Works (KLWX) in August 2020. Plans for the second unit (no. 8521) were abandoned and instead converted into an AC44C6M.

== Operators ==
Image	Railroad	Quantity	Road numbers	Notes
	CSX	50	7930-7979	These are former Union Pacific and Chicago & North Western C44-9W's that Union Pacific had retired in 2025 and sold to Wabtec. These were purchased as Rebuild cores by CSX and will be designated as CM44AH.
	Norfolk Southern	1016	3964–4366, 4368-4980 8520	Originally built as C40-9s, C40-9Ws, and AC4400CWs. All C40-9's and C40-9W's were uprated from 4,000 to 4,400 horsepower between 2013-2014. 4001 wrecked and subsequently repaired. 4063 wrecked in 2018 and retired. 4000–4005 & 8520 were painted into special paint liveries, 8520 classed as AC44C6CF and retains original cab; later retired and sold. 4822 was rebuilt in May 2024 and was repainted into the Honoring Railroaders paint scheme. 4856-4880 were rebuilt from former GECX/BNSF Dash 9s in 2024. 3964-3999 were rebuilt from ex-CEFX AC4400CWs and were planned to deliver in 2025, but were never delivered to NS with 25 out of 36 units being sold to FXE. 4367 was renumbered to 4400 in 2020. 4851 was rebuilt in November 2024 and painted into the TAG heritage scheme. 3968–3993 and 4960–4979 have been ordered in 2026. Units 3968, 3969, 3971, 3972, 3974, and 3979 were renumbered to 3994 (2nd)–3999 (2nd) respectively. 4980-4982 will be painted in a scheme to honor 200 years of Norfolk Southern history, with 4980 already being completed as of November 2026.
	QNS&L	26	430-455	Originally built as BNSF/GECX C44-9Ws.
	Fortescue	28	101-128	Originally built as BNSF/GECX C44-9Ws. Feature larger radiators for expanded cooling capacity, similar to ES44ACi and ES44DCi.
	Union Pacific	75	9500, 9600, 9700, 9800 series	Planned rebuilding of UP's C44-9W's. These are all classified as C44ACM.
	Canadian National	160	3300-3459	Rebuilding of CN/BNSF C44-9W. 3410-3459 were ordered in 2025.
	Knoxville Locomotive Works (KLWX)	1	8520	Ex-NS AC44C6CF.
	Ferromex (FXE)	60	4880-4939	Former NS. 25 units rebuilt from ex-CEFX AC4400CWs and 35 from D9-44CWs. These were rebuilt to NS specs but were never delivered to NS in 2025.
	Wabtec	1	616	Rebuilt from a former BNSF AC44C4M in 2025; acquired 2018. Former ATSF.
