= GE AC4400CW =

Diesel-electric locomotive

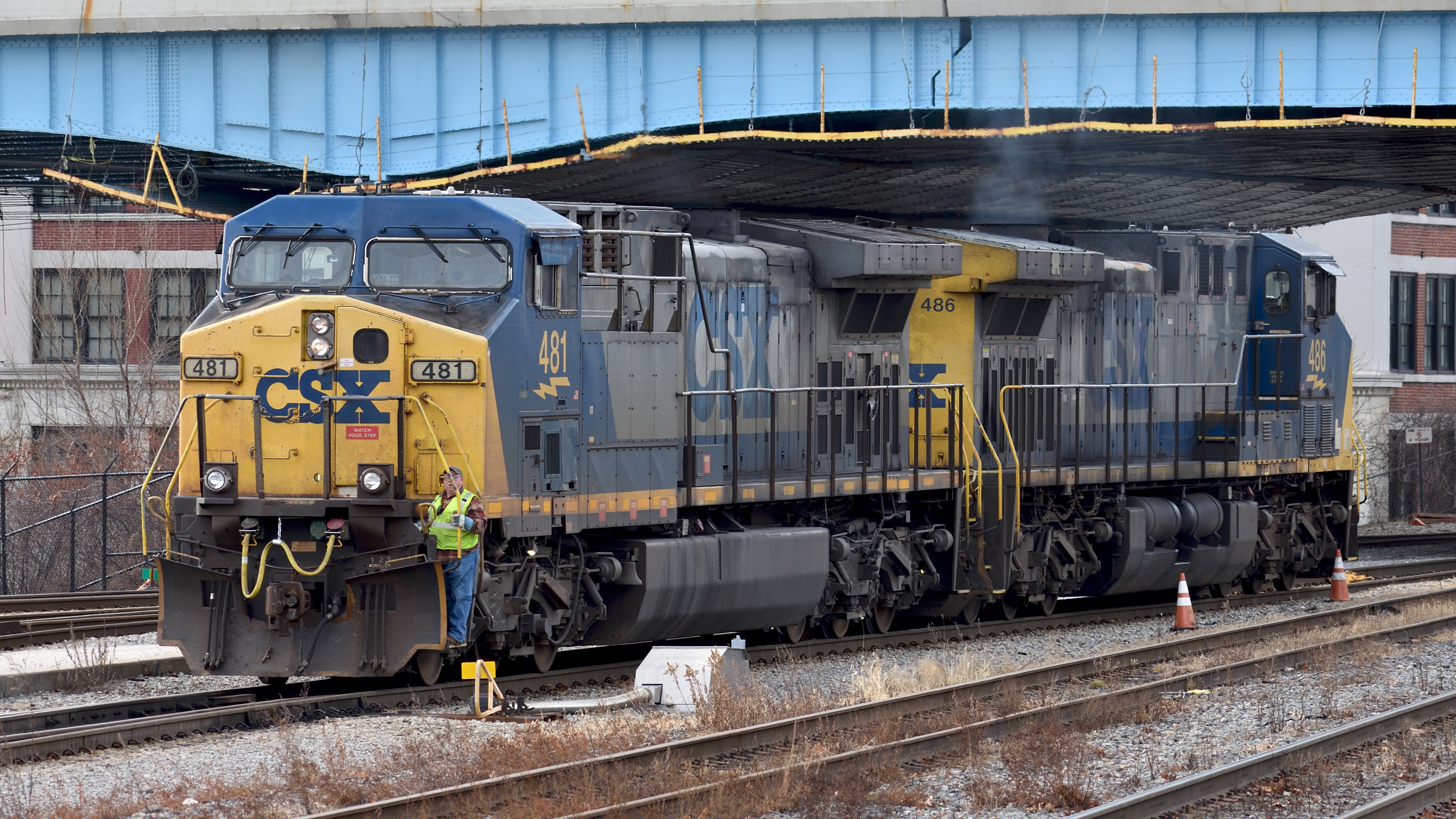
- A conductor rides on a pair of CSX AC4400CW locomotives in Worcester, Massachusetts.
Type and origin
- Power type: Diesel-electric
- Builder: GE Transportation Systems
- Model: AC4400CW; AC44i
- Build date: 1993–2004 (AC4400CW), 2008–2022 (AC44i)
- Total produced: 3,558
Specifications
- Configuration
  - AAR: C-C
  - UIC: Co'Co'
- Gauge: 4 ft 8 1/2 in (1,435 mm) standard gauge 5 ft 3 in (1,600 mm) (Brazil)
- Wheel diameter: 42 in (1,067 mm)
- Wheelbase: 13 ft 2 in (4.01 m)
- Length: 73 ft 2 in (22.30 m)
- Height: 15 ft 6 in (4.72 m)
- Loco weight: 426,000 lb (193,000 kg)
- Fuel capacity: 5,000 US gal (19,000 L; 4,200 imp gal)
- Prime mover: GE 7FDL-16
- Traction motors: 6
Performance figures
- Power output: 4,400 hp (3,300 kW)
- Tractive effort: 180,000 lbf (800 kN) Starting; 145,000 lbf (640 kN) at 13.7 mph (22.0 km/h)
Career
- Operators: Various, see table
- Locale: North America; Brazil; Nigeria

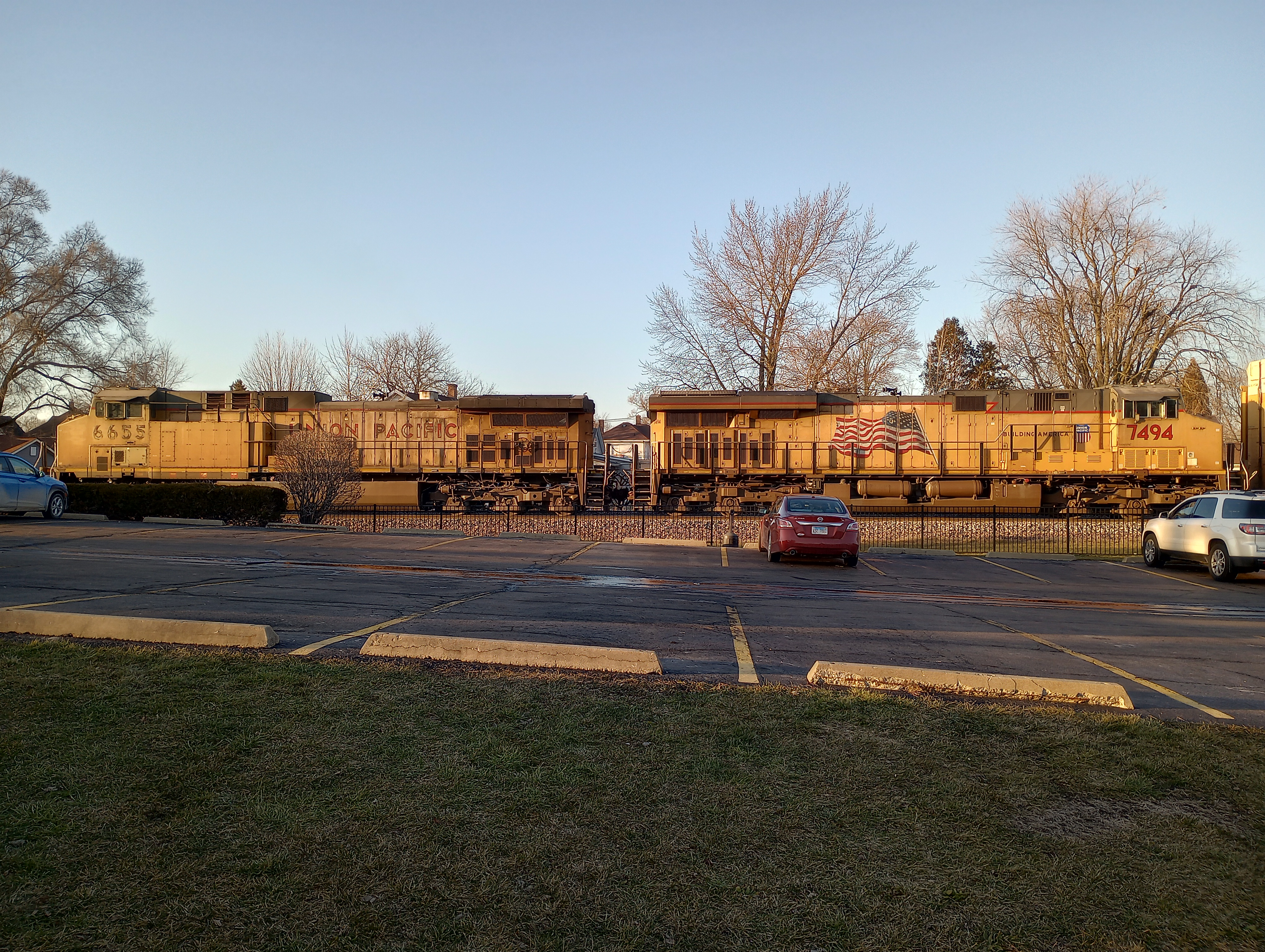
UP AC44CW #6655 sits with a Union Pacific Railroad GE Evolution Series ES44AC #7494.

The GE AC4400CW, sometimes referred to as "AC44CW", is a 4,400 horsepower (3,300 kW) diesel-electric locomotive that was built by GE Transportation Systems between 1993 and 2004. It is similar to the Dash 9-44CW, but uses AC traction motors instead of DC, with a separate inverter per motor.

3,018 units were built for North American railroads over an 11-year production and 577 AC44i units for the Brazilian railroads. In 2005, all Class I freight railroads except Norfolk Southern and Canadian National owned at least one AC4400CW. Both Norfolk Southern and Canadian National ordered the very similar Dash 9s, although NS would later acquire 36 former CEFX AC4400CWs in August 2023, with 11 being rebuilt into AC44C6Ms and 25 being sold to Wabtec and subsequently Ferromex. As a result of more stringent emissions requirements that came into effect in January 2005, GE no longer offers the AC4400CW, replacing it with the ES44AC. A 6,000 Horsepower (4,500kW) version was offered, known as the AC6000CW.

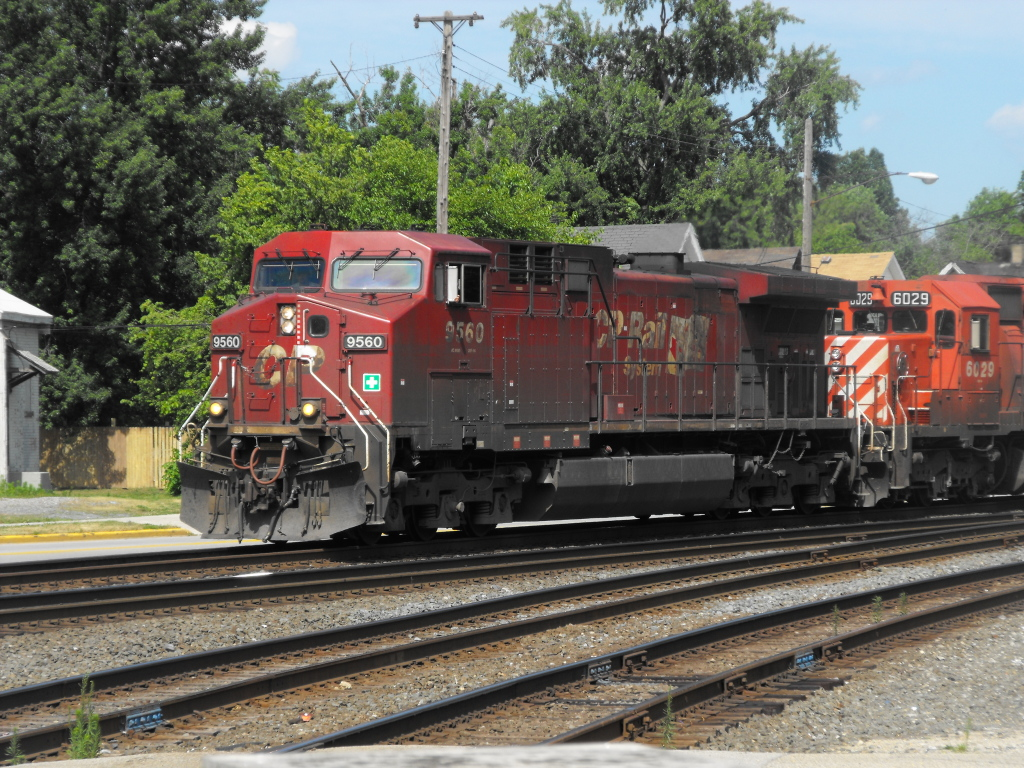
CP AC4400CW #9560 and CP SD40-2 #6029 head west towards the NS Elkhart Yard, 2009

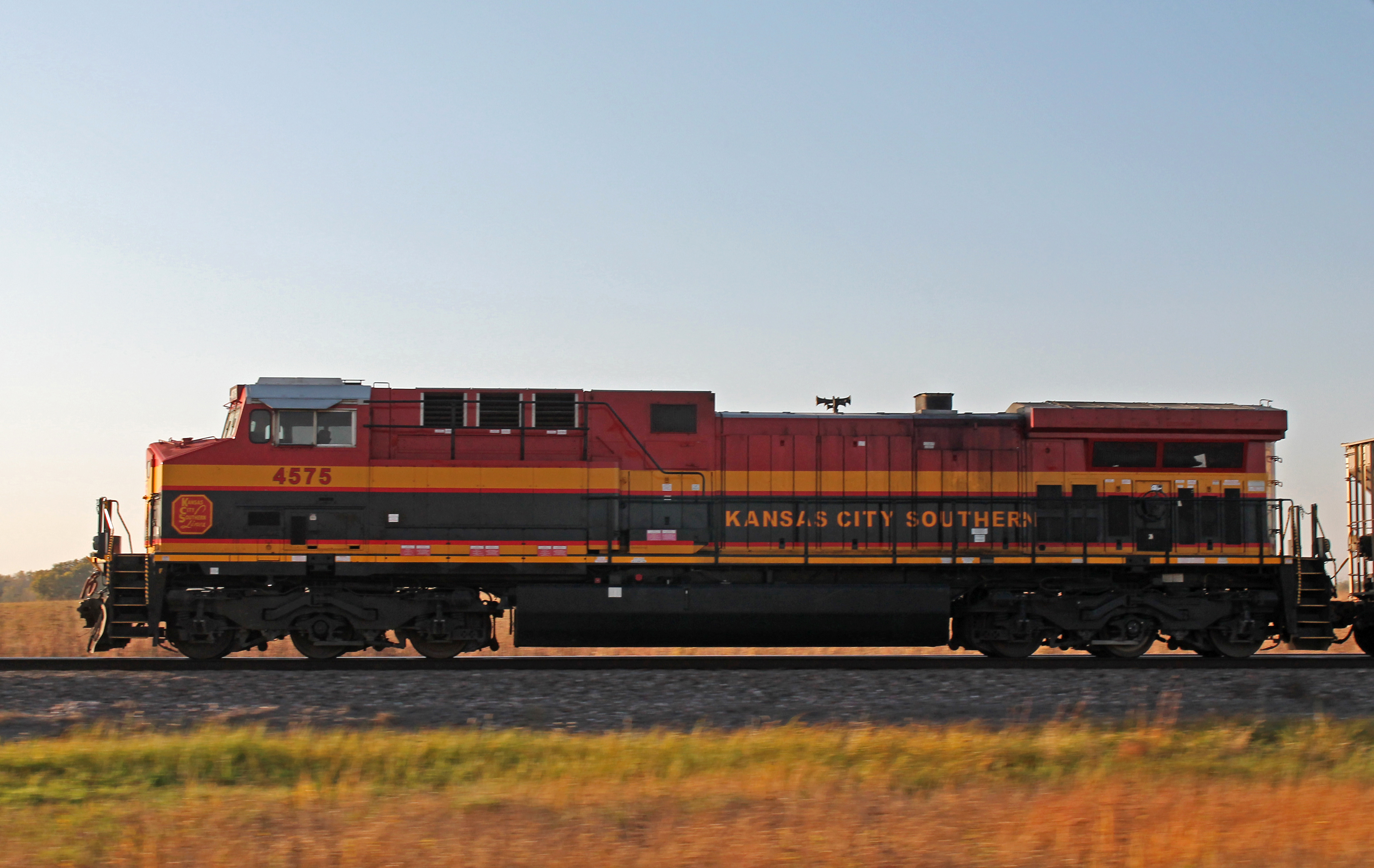
Kansas City Southern AC4400CW no. 4575 with self-steering trucks in October 2014

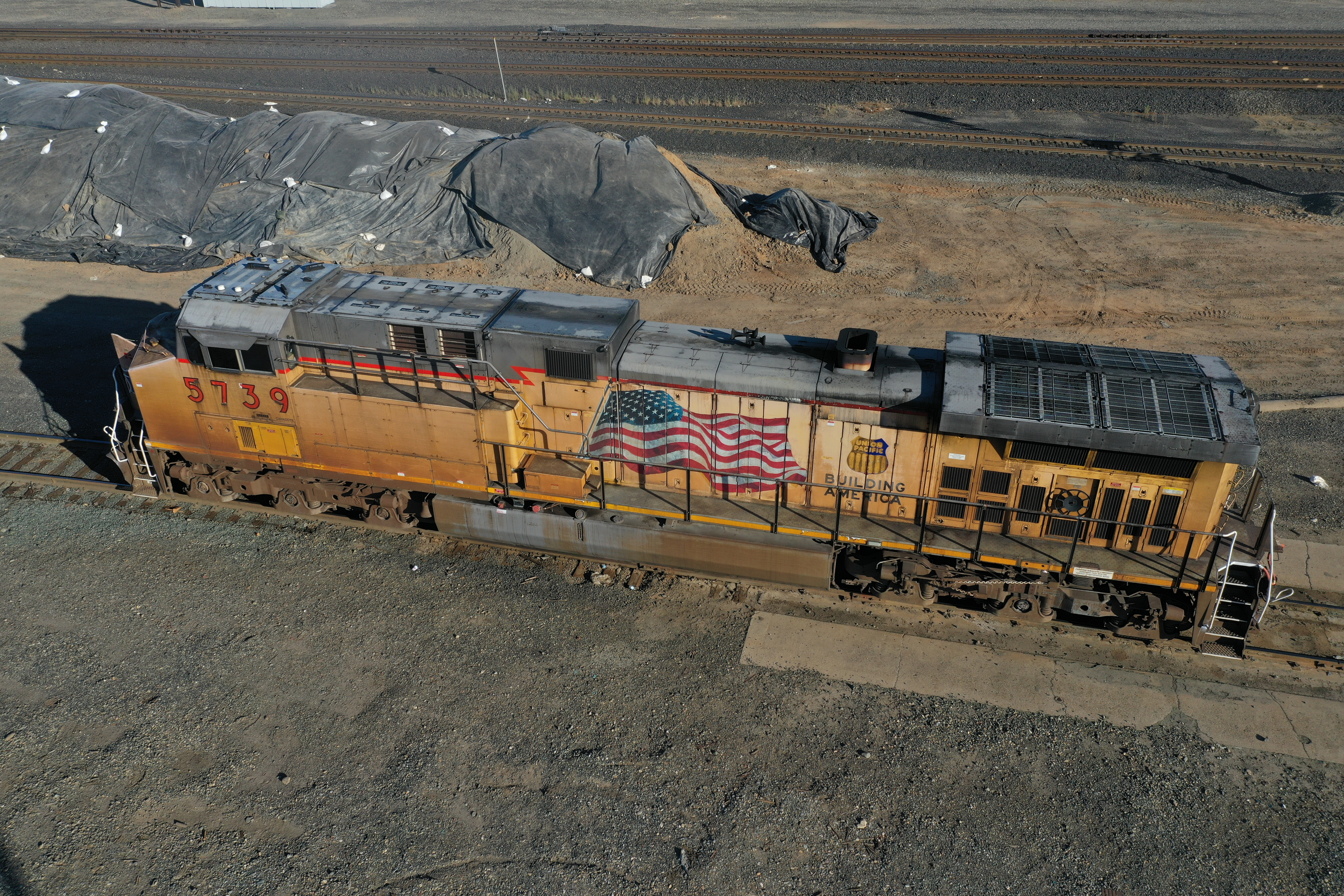
UP 5739 (AC4400CW), in Roseville, CA

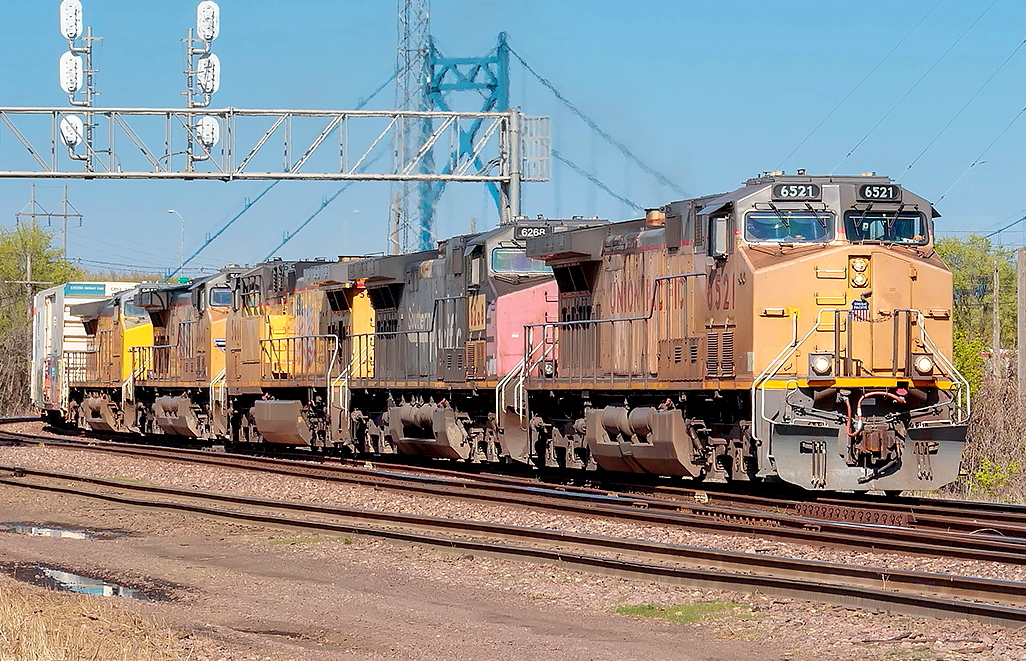
UP no. #6521 with a trailing ex-Southern Pacific AC4400CW

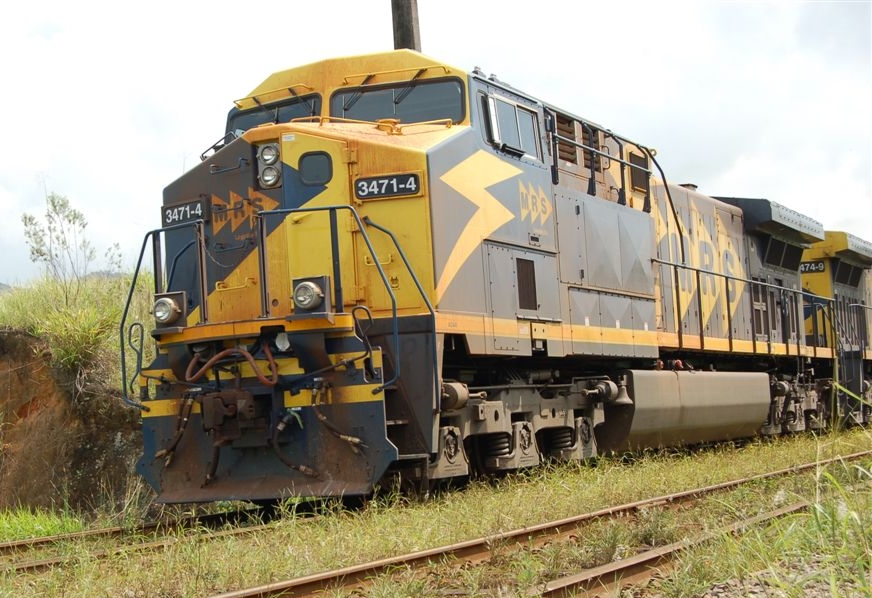
MRS GE AC44i MRS 347 Barreiro - Belo Horizonte

== Design variations ==
The AC4400CW was the first GE locomotive to offer an optional self-steering truck design, intended to increase adhesion and reduce wear on the railhead. This option was specified by Canadian Pacific Railway, Cartier Railway, CSX for their units 201-599, Ferromex, Ferrosur, and Kansas City Southern Railway. The other railroads still used the hi-ad truck design

CSX ordered many of its AC4400CW locomotives with 20,000 lb (9,100 kg) extra weight to increase tractive effort. These same units were also modified in 2006-2007 with a "high tractive effort" software upgrade and redesignated CW44AH.

== Rebuilds ==
In 2017, Canadian Pacific (now Canadian Pacific Kansas City) requested that General Electric modernize 30 of its 9500 and 9600-series AC4400CW units. The original units had the original front cab completely removed and upgraded to current GE standards with upgraded electrical systems including PTC and FTO systems. Other improvements GE has made include up to 10 percent fuel efficiency gains, 40 percent increase in reliability and 50 percent increase in haulage ability. The units were subsequently placed into service with the designation AC4400CWM (for Modernized). The first batch of rebuilds (8100–8129) also had their original Steerable trucks replaced with GEs High Adhesion trucks, where later batches each individual engine kept the trucks they already had.

The following year Canadian Pacific asked GE to similarly rebuild several more batches for a total of 110 locomotives. The second order (8130–8144) retains their steerable trucks. The third batch (8000–8064) will feature an Evolution Series sized fuel tank and radial trucks. In 2019 a fourth batch of rebuilds happened, 8145–8160 and 8064–8080 from the 95/9600-series. In 2021 the 8500 series is slated to be rebuilt as 8201–8280 and the 8100-series be completed.

The Union Pacific Railroad (UP) ordered many of their AC4400CWs with Controlled Tractive Effort software, giving them the designation of C44ACCTE. This software package is now standard on a portion of their ES44ACs as well. CTE limits tractive effort to mimic TE level of Dash series locomotives. In late 2023, they were all be rebuilt into C44ACMs.

In 2018, UP placed a small order for 20 rebuilds from GE of their AC4460CW fleet and later announced that they would be upgrading 1,000 of their AC4460CWs and AC44s into the new C44ACM class over the next 15 years. Unlike CP, the original 20 rebuilds did not receive a new crew cab.

CSX also placed orders to rebuild their large AC4400CW fleet. An initial batch of 10 AC4400CWs were rebuilt at Wabtec's Erie, Pennsylvania facility, with 40 more to follow. CSX continued the program and had received a total of 260 rebuilt locomotives by 2024. A final order has been placed to rebuild the remaining 200 plus locomotives and will be completed from 2024-2028. The rebuilds are numbered in the 7000-7600 series and CSX is referring to them as CM44ACs and CM44AHs.

NS recently acquired 36 of these locomotives from CEFX in June 2023. They are currently being patched for starting service on the roster. These units will be rebuilt to AC44C6M locomotives (similar to the ones from the Dash 9 locomotives) at the Wabtec locomotive plant in Fort Worth, TX. The first unit, NS 3980, was the first unit to be rebuilt into an AC44C6M and was undergoing testing at the Wabtec facility. 25 of the 36 units that were rebuilt were never delivered to NS, and were later sold to Wabtec, then to FXE.

== Operators ==
AC4400CW owners and operators past and present include:

| Owners | Qty | Numbers | Year delivered | Notes |
AC4400CW
| Union Pacific | 1,483 | 5554-5694, 5700-6081, 6145-6425, 6430-6702, 6703-6887, 6995-6999, 7000-7009 and 7080-7297 | 1994–2004 | 6145-6425 are Ex Southern Pacific Units 100-378, 6703-6737 are Ex Chicago and Northwestern Units 8801-8835 and 7000-7009 are Ex GECX Units 4000-4009, 6706 still wears Chicago and Northwestern paint, 6310, 6318, 6367, 6378 and 6379 still wear Southern Pacific colors. Most units rebuilt into C44ACMs. Units 6700-6702 were renumbered from 9997-9999. Minimal units were wrecked and retired. 5554-5694 and 5700-6081 are classified as C44ACCTE by UP. Unit 6759 rebuilt with the cab from a wrecked CN C44-9W. |
| CSX Transportation | 594 | 3-174, 201-599, 5101-5122 | 1994–2002 | Units to be rebuilt to CM44AC/CM44AHs and renumbered to 7000-7600 series. Some units were wrecked and retired before the rebuild. 365 was sold to Larry’s Truck and Electric in 2020 and scrapped. 1-14 were former 9100-9113. Unit 7005 (formerly 14) was wrecked in March 2023 and retired. 1 and 2 were renumbered to 173 (2nd) and 174 (2nd) respectively. |
| Canadian Pacific Kansas City | 563 | KCS 4500-4624; CP 8500-8580, 8600-8655, 9500-9683, 9700-9740, 9750-9784 and 9800-9840. | 1995–2004 | 9777, 9782, 9758, and 9751 used during filming of Unstoppable. Most units rebuilt to AC4400CWMs. Renumbered to the 8000-8080, 8100-8178, and 8200-8210 series, and CPKC 4500-4574 are ex-TFM/KCSM 2600-2674. 4575-4624 were renumbered from 2000-2049. 9813 was wrecked and retired. |
| Southern Pacific | 279 | 100-378 | 1995 | All to Union Pacific 6145-6425. Units 145 and 224 destroyed in wreck in 1996, with 145's cab being reused on UP 9775, a C44-9W. |
| BNSF | 121 | 5600-5717, 5838-5840 | 1999–2004 | 40 units leased to Metrolink from 2015 to 2016. 5701 was wrecked and scrapped. 5838-5840 are warranty protection units. |
| Ferromex | 75 | 4500-4574 | 1998–2000 | 4508 was wrecked and retired. |
| CIT Group | 59 | 1001-1059 | 2001–2004 | 1002 and 1006 sold to CMQ in 2017, and later returned in 2020s. 36 units sold to NS in 2023 and rebuilt to AC44C6Ms, but 25 of them were never delivered & later resold to FXE. 7 units were exported to Nigeria in 2025, 7 to AMMC, and 8 to LSI. |
| Ferrosur | 38 | 4400-4437 | 2000-2004 | |
| Chicago and North Western Transportation Company | 35 | 8801-8835 | 1994 | All to Union Pacific which became #6703 - #6737 by UP. 6707 was wrecked and retired. UP 6706 now the last CNW Locomotive left. |
| Cartier Railway | 19 | 11-29 | 2001–2007 | |
| Quebec, North Shore and Labrador | 12 | 415-426 | 2005–2006 | |
| Cerrejón | 5 | 10010-10014 | unknown | |
| General Electric Corporation Leasing | 11 | 2000, later renumbered 4400, 4000-4009 | 1993–1997 | 4000-4009 have been sold to UP as 7000-7009. 7007 has been rebuilt to C44ACM. |
| Ferrominera del Orinoco | 2 | 1058-1059 | 2004 | |
| Norfolk Southern | 36 | 3964-3999 | 2001–2004 (acquired 2023) | Ex-CEFX. The units will be rebuilt into AC44C6M. The units were rebuilt but never delivered, and 25 were later sold to Wabtec, which resold them to FXE. |
AC44i
| MRS Logística | 287 | 3401-3495, 7210-7352 | 2008–2017 | |
| ALL | 46 | 603-617, 633-639, 8273-8286, 9051-9060 | 2015–2017 | All to Rumo Logística after merger. |
| Rumo Logística | 178 | 680-698, 754-787, 8287-8299, 8316-8324, 9810-9859, 9865-9917 | 2010–2015 | |
| Brado Logistics | 13 | 9061, 9062, 9580, 9860-9864, 9918-9922 | 2012–2018 | All to Rumo Logística after merger. |
| VLI Multimodal | 32 | 8563-8594 | 2012–2016 | |
| Fibria | 21 | 8394-8399, 8414-8428 | unknown | |
| Totals | 3,558 | | | |

== AC4400CWM's ==
AC4400CW owners and operators include:

| Owners | Qty | Numbers | Years Rebuilt | Notes |
AC4400CWM
| Canadian Pacific Kansas City | 171 | CP 8000-8080, 8100-8178, 8200-8210 | 2017-2021 | former 8500, 9500 and 9600 series AC4400CW's from Canadian Pacific. Units 8101, 8116, 8119, 8128 are in CPKC Paint. |
| CSX Transportation | 413 | 250, 2026, 7000-7045, 7081-7141, 7200-7293, 7300-7326, 7380-7391, 7409-7458, 7460-7483, 7500-7510, 7560-7594, 7600, 7930-7979 | 2020-Present | Units are designated as CM44AC and CM44AH. Rebuilt from CW44AC's and CW44AH's previously numbered from 1-594, 5101-5122. Units 250 and 2026 are CSX's American 250 or Semiquincentennial special interest units. Units 7500, 7502, 7509 and 7510 are the Biodiesel CM44AH's. Numbers 7930-7979 will be rebuilt from Former Union Pacific and Chicago & North Western C44-9W's that Union Pacific retired in 2025 and sold to Wabtec, Although these are DC to AC Conversion rebuilds they will be rebuilt to CM44AH specifications. |
| Ferromex | 25 | 4880-4904 | 2024-2025 | These were from a canceled AC44C6M order from Norfolk Southern that were from the 3900 series. All were former NS AC4400CW's that were also numbered in the 3900 series before being rebuilt and were purchased in 2023. All were apart of the CEFX AC4400CW fleet originally. These are Designated as AC44C6M But, are Modernized AC Unit's. |
| Norfolk Southern | 11 | 3989-3999 | 2025 | Former CEFX AC4400CW's purchased in 2023. Units 3994-3999 were former NS Units 3968, 3969, 3971, 3972, 3974 and 3979. These are Designated as AC44C6M But, are Modernized AC Unit's. |
| Union Pacific | 980 | 5554-5596, 5604-5688, 5700-5799, 5800-5899, 5901-5999, 6000-6080, 6146-6194, 6200-6298, 6307-6399, 6402-6498, 6500-6595, 6600-6699, 7007, 7010-7066 2nd, 7069-7097, 7101-7199, 7200-7295, 7300-7344 | 2017-Present | All are former Union Pacific, Southern Pacific, Chicago & North Western and GECX AC4400CW's, AC4460CW's and AC6000CW's some are former C44ACCTE's that had the Control Tractive Effort Software. Units 6146-6425 are Former Southern Pacific Units. Units 6712-6734 are former Chicago & North Western Units. Unit 7007 is former GECX No. 4007 and Units 6888-6968, 7010-7079 and 7300-7335 are former AC4460CW's and AC6000CW's. (Note many of these blocks have vacant road numbers because not all units have been rebuilt.) |

== In popular culture ==
The plot of the movie Unstoppable required Denzel Washington and Chris Pine to climb aboard the lead locomotive of a runaway freight train. To film the movie, four Canadian Pacific AC4400CW locomotives (Nos. 9777, 9758, 9782, and 9751), were repainted as two fictional "Allegheny and West Virginia Railroad" locomotives (Nos. 777 (nicknamed "Triple 7") and 767). 9777 and 9782 were painted as 777, while 9758 and 9751 were painted as 767.
