= GE Dash 9-44CW =

Locomotive class

GE C44-9W
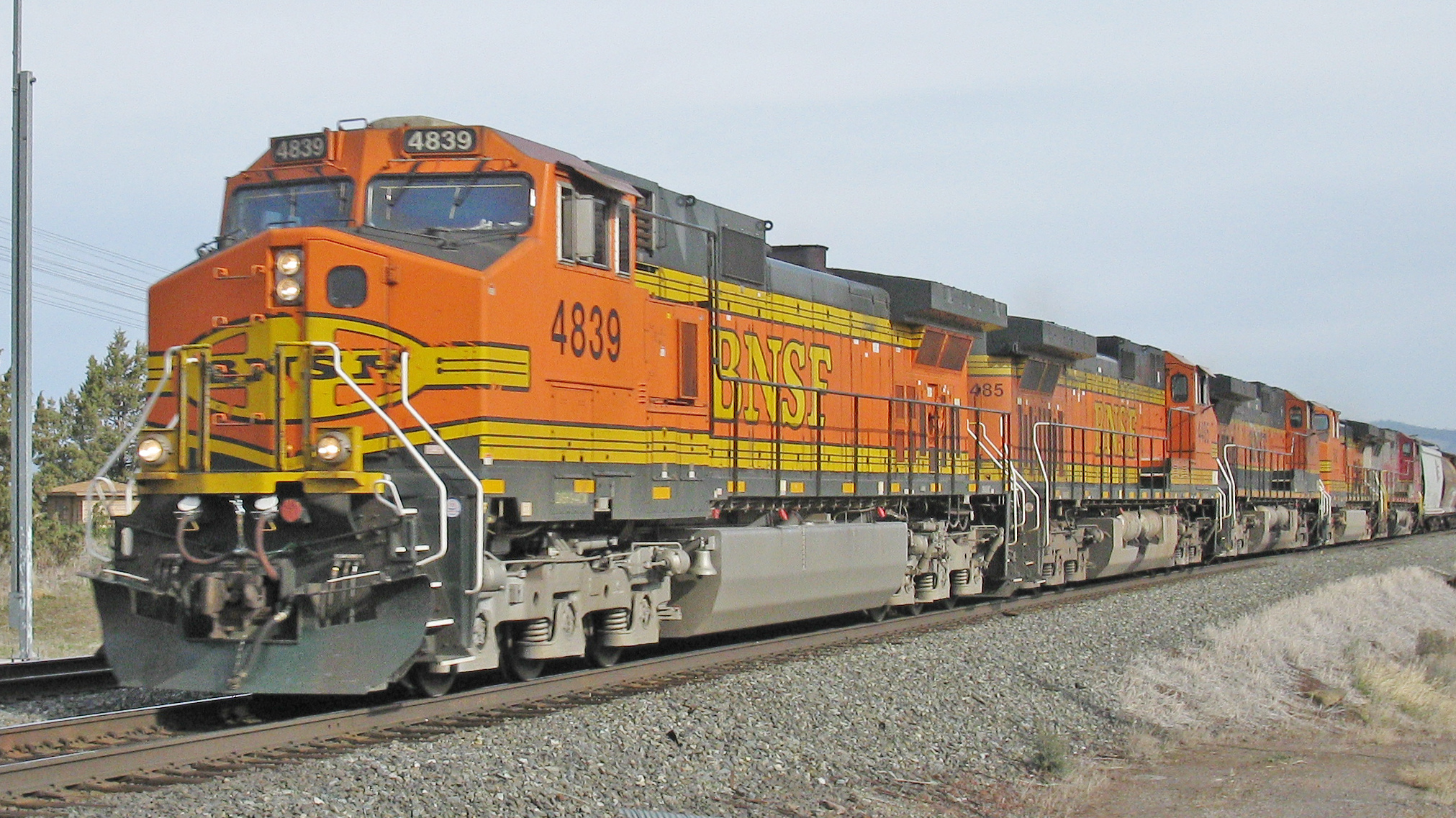
- A BNSF train consisting of multiple C44-9W locomotives.
Type and origin
- Power type: Diesel-electric
- Builder: GE Transportation Systems
- Model: C44-9W
- Build date: 1993–2004
- Total produced: 3,682
Specifications
- Configuration
  - AAR: C-C
  - UIC: Co′Co′
- Gauge: 4 ft 8 1/2 in (1,435 mm); 5 ft 3 in (1,600 mm), Brazil
- Trucks: Hi-Adhesion C-C 6-Wheel
- Wheel diameter: 42 in (1,100 mm)
- Minimum curve: 23°
- Wheelbase: 13 ft 4 in (4.06 m)
- Pivot centres: 66 ft 2 in (20.17 m)
- Length: 73 ft 8 in (22.45 m)
- Width: 10 ft 3 in (3.12 m)
- Height: 16 ft 0 in (4.88 m)
- Loco weight: 425,000 lb (193,000 kilograms) or 212.5 short tons (189.7 long tons; 192.8 t)
- Fuel capacity: 5,300 US gal (20,000 L; 4,400 imp gal)
- Lubricant cap.: 410 US gal (1,600 L; 340 imp gal)
- Coolant cap.: 380 US gal (1,400 L; 320 imp gal)
- Sandbox cap.: 55 ft^{3} (1,600 L)
- Prime mover: GE 7FDL16
- RPM
  - RPM idle: 450
  - Maximum RPM: 1050
- Engine type: four stroke cycle V16 diesel engine
- Aspiration: Turbocharged
- Alternator: GE GMG197
- Generator: Main: GE - GMG197; Auxiliary: GYA30A
- Traction motors: GE 5GE752AH DC
- Cylinders: 16
- Cylinder size: 9 in (230 mm) x 10.5 in (270 mm)
- Transmission: diesel electric with silicon diode rectifiers
- Gear ratio: 74:18
- MU working: Yes
- Train brakes: Westinghouse 26L (Air Brake)
Performance figures
- Maximum speed: 74 mph (119 km/h)
- Power output: 4,400 hp (3,300 kW)
- Tractive effort
  - Starting: 142,000 lbf (64,000 kgf) @25%
  - Continuous: 105,640 lbf (47,920 kgf) @13 mph (21 km/h)
Career
- Operators: Various, see table
- Locale: North America, Brazil, Australia

The GE C44-9W is a 4,400 hp (3,281 kW) diesel-electric locomotive built by GE Transportation Systems of Erie, Pennsylvania. Keeping in tradition with GE's locomotive series nicknames beginning with the "Dash 7" of the 1970s, the C44-9W was dubbed the Dash 9 upon its debut in 1993.

Part of GE's "Dash 9" series of locomotives, the Dash 9-44CW shares its frame, HiAd trucks, 16-cylinder 7FDL engine, and 752AH-31 traction motors with the GE Dash 9-40CW. But while the more common 9-44CW offers 4,400 horsepower (3,300 kW), software in the 9-40CW's engine-governing unit restricts its power output to 4,000 horsepower (3,000 kW).

The design has since proven popular with North American railroads, although some railroads, such as CSX and Canadian Pacific, preferred its AC equivalent, the AC4400CW. Because of more stringent emissions requirements that came into effect in the United States on January 1, 2005, the Dash 9-44CW has been replaced in production by the GE ES44DC.

Many North American railroads have ordered the C44-9W. They were originally ordered by Chicago & North Western Railway, Santa Fe, BNSF, CSX, Southern Pacific, Canadian National Railway, BC Rail, and Union Pacific Railroad. Norfolk Southern purchased the very similar Dash 9-40CWs. In 2013 - 2014, Norfolk Southern uprated their Dash 9-40CWs fleet to 4,400 horsepower, making them Dash 9-44CWs.

== Rebuilds ==
The BNSF AC44C4M is an Ex-ATSF GE C44-9W rebuilt with AC traction motors and an A1A-A1A wheel arrangement. The internal controls are similar to those of the newer GE ES44C4.

== Original owners ==
Image	Railroad	Quantity	Road numbers	Notes
	Atchison, Topeka and Santa Fe Railway	100	600–699	To BNSF 600-699; ATSF 666 renumbered to BNSF 599 in the early 2000s; 21 units rebuilt as AC44C4M. 616 was sold to Wabtec.
	BC Rail	14	4641-4644; 4645–4654	4641-4644 equipped with 'Canadian style' four-window cab, classified as Dash 9-44CWL. 4643 was burned from an engine fire and scrapped.
	BNSF Railway	1697	700–799, 960–1123, 4000–4199, 4300–5532	4470-4537, 4556-4587, 4591, 4592, 4772-4978, and 5370 sold to GECX following lease expiration with some being resold to G&W. 4385 and 4934 were wrecked and retired in 2002 and 2013 respectively while 5162, 5212, and 5416 were all wrecked and retired in 2016. Some units sold to Fortescue Metals Group, Quebec, North Shore & Labrador, Canadian National, and Norfolk Southern and rebuilt into AC44C6M models. 100 units sold to KCS; 45 of them were later sold to NS and returned to GECX by 2025. 5530-5532 are warranty protection units, which were renumbered from 5841-5843. 25 of the GECX units were rebuilt to NS AC44C6Ms.
	Canadian National Railway	233	2200-2205; 2500–2522; 2523-2726; 2727	2500-2522 equipped with 'Canadian style' four-window cab, classified as Dash 9-44CWL; 50 units rebuilt into AC44C6M models. 2727 rebuilt from 2667. Units 2697-2726 sub-lettered for Illinois Central. Non four-window cab variants came equipped with a different style cab where the nose slants down on both sides, allowing the windows to be notched at the bottom outer corners, known as "teardrop" windows. 2584 was wrecked and retired, Its cab was later reused on UP 6759, a GE AC4400CW.
	Chicago and North Western Transportation Company	130	8601–8730	To UP 9665-9699, UP 9740-9834. UP 9775 rebuilt with cab salvaged from SP AC4400CW #145. 26 units returned to Wabtec in 2025, with some sold to CSX for CM44AH cores. 9760 was sold to LTEX in 2025.
	CSX	53	9000–9052	Dash 8-40CW carbody with Dash 9 software. Many units sold off. Unit 9011 was wrecked and scrapped in 2005.
	Estrada de Ferro Carajás (Brazil)	67	801–867	
	Ferrovia Norte do Brasil (Brazil)	50	9001–9050	
	Fortescue Metals Group, Western Australia	23	001–015 (new) 016-023 (RTO)	016-023 are ex-GECX/BNSF. 003 and 006 were scrapped in April 2025.
	General Electric (testbed)	1	905	
	Pilbara Rail, Western Australia	72	7043–7050, 7053–7098, 9404–9409, 9428–9436, 9470–9472 (re-numbered to 9401–9403)	
	Norfolk Southern	1090	8889–9978	Dash 9-40CW: 4,000 horsepower (3,000 kW), although the engineer could override this restriction to obtain 4,400 horsepower (3,300 kW). Norfolk Southern uprated the units to 4,400 horsepower between October 2013 and September 2014, changing the model designation to Dash 9-44CW. All to be rebuilt as AC44C6Ms. 8917, 9100,9274, 9368, 9522, 9632, 9692, 9796, 9847, 9874, and 9939 were wrecked and retired. 35 units sold as AC44C6M rebuild cores to FXE.
	Quebec North Shore and Labrador Railway	11	404–414	Retired.
	Southern Pacific Railroad	101	8100–8200	To UP 9564-9664. 9593 was wrecked and retired.
	Union Pacific Railroad	40	9700–9739	To be rebuilt into AC44C6Ms. Classified C44ACM. 9707, 9716, and 9731 were wrecked and retired. 25 units returned to Wabtec in 2025, with some sold to CSX for CM44AH cores.
	Totals	3,682	—N/a	—N/a

== See also ==
- GE C38AChe, based on the GE Dash 9-44CW design and operating on the Qinghai-Tibet route in China
