= GE 7FDM =

The GE 7FDM, also known as the GE V228, is a series of marine engines from GE Transportation Systems for propulsion and electric generator usage. Engine model numbers for the 7FDM series of engines take the form of 7FDMXXZYY, where XX is the number of cylinders, Z is the engine series, and YY is an additional differentiator between engines. GE Transportation is now producing 7FDM engines in the "D" and "E" series, which both feature very low NOx emissions, electronic timing, and other state-of-the-art features. The additional YY designation refers to the direction of engine rotation (clockwise or anticlockwise), or other physical attributes of the engine.

GE 7FDM engines are available in models from 8-cylinder to 16-cylinder, 900 rpm to 1,050 rpm, and 1,308 to 3,052 kW (1,754 to 4,093 hp) (continuous). These engines comply with MARPOL Annex VI regulations for NOx emissions on board ships for E2, E3, D2, and C1 cycles. These engines are being installed in tugboats, fishing vessels, and other small, high-powered vessels.

== See also ==
- List of GE reciprocating engines
