= GE AC6000CW =

American Diesel-electric locomotive (1995–2001)

- CSX GE CW60AC no. 5015 in 2015
Type and origin
- Power type: Diesel-electric
- Builder: GE Transportation
- Model: AC6000CW
- Build date: 1995–2001
- Total produced: 317
Specifications
- Configuration
  - AAR: C-C
  - UIC: Co′Co′
  - Commonwealth: Co-Co
- Gauge: 4 ft 8 1/2 in (1,435 mm) standard gauge
- Wheel diameter: 42 in (1,067 mm)
- Length: 76 ft 0 in (23.16 m)
- Width: 10 ft 3 in (3.12 m)
- Height: 16 ft 0 in (4.88 m)
- Axle load: 72,000 lb (32,658.7 kilograms; 32.7 tonnes) max
- Loco weight: 423,000–432,000 lb (192,000–196,000 kilograms); 212–216 short tons (189–193 long tons; 192–196 t)
- Fuel type: diesel fuel
- Fuel capacity: 5,500 US gal (21,000 L; 4,600 imp gal) or 6,200 US gal (23,000 L; 5,200 imp gal)
- Prime mover: GE 7FDL-16, 7HDL-16, GEVO-16 (rebuilds)
- RPM range: 200–1,050
- Engine type: 45° V16, four-stroke cycle
- Aspiration: Twin turbocharger, model 7S1408D
- Displacement: 251.2 liters (15,330 cu in) (7HDL-16, GEVO-16); 175.2 liters (10,690 cu in) (7FDL16)
- Alternator: GE GMG201
- Traction motors: GE GEB13 AC
- Cylinders: 16
- Transmission: diesel electric AC Alternator to DC link to AC Traction inverters and Motors
- MU working: Yes
- Loco brake: Dynamic and electropneumatic brake
- Train brakes: WABCO EPIC 3102 Electropneumatic, others with WABCO 26L pneumatic
Performance figures
- Maximum speed: 75 mph (121 km/h) (worn wheels)
- Power output: 6,000 hp (4,500 kW) on 7HDL-16A/GEVO-16, 4,500 hp (3,400 kW) 7FDL-16
- Tractive effort: Starting: 188,000 lbf (840 kN); Continuous: 166,000 lbf (740 kN) @ 11.6 mph (18.7 km/h)
- Factor of adh.: 2.16 to 2.35
Career
- Operators: CSX Transportation; Union Pacific Railroad; BHP Billiton
- Locale: North America, Australia
- Preserved: 1 (GECX 6002, formerly Union Pacific 7511)
- Disposition: Nearly all units built have been retired, scrapped (All BHP units scrapped), or rebuilt as C44ACM, GECX 6002 (formerly Union Pacific 7511) preserved at the Lake Shore Railway Museum in North East, Pennsylvania, one converted to a bar by Aberdeen, Carolina and Western Railway, some still in service.

The GE AC6000CW (also known as C60AC, CW60AC and CW60AH) is an AC-traction, 6,000-horsepower (4,500 kW), six-axle diesel electric locomotive built between 1995 and 2001 by GE Transportation. It is among the world's most powerful single-engined diesel locomotives. The locomotive was designed for extremely high horsepower needs, such as pulling heavy coal and ore trains. Most examples were purchased by two railroads: Union Pacific and CSX. The only other operator of this locomotive was BHP Billiton Iron Ore.

== Design and production ==
The AC6000CW was designed at the height of a horsepower race between the two major locomotive manufacturers, Electro-Motive Diesel of La Grange, Illinois with the SD90MAC, and GE Transportation of Erie, Pennsylvania with the AC6000CW, in the early to mid 1990s. The goal was to reach 6,250 horsepower (4,660 kW).

General Electric worked with Deutz-MWM of Germany in 1994 to design and construct a new 6,250-horsepower (4,660-kilowatt) engine named the "7HDL-16" for the locomotives. The first locomotive with this new engine was the "Green Machine" GECX No. 6000, nicknamed for its green demonstrator paint scheme. The first production models were also built in 1995: CSX Transportation 600-602, and Union Pacific Railroad 7000-7009. All these locomotives were released to their respective owners in late 1996, once GE's testing was complete. Union Pacific opted for the Hi-Ad trucks for all of their units, while CSX opted for the self-steering trucks to reduce track wear.

=== Production ===
GE Transportation built 106 AC6000CWs for Union Pacific, but with the older, proven 7FDL-16 engine installed, rated for 4,400 hp (3,300 kW). These units were originally intended to be converted to the 6,250 hp (4,660 kW) 7HDL engine after some problems with the 7HDL were solved, but the conversion never occurred. GE calls these units AC6000CW "Convertibles", while UP classifies them as C6044ACs or AC4460CWs.

The AC6000CW ended production in 2001. Union Pacific designates their units as C60AC, CSX as CW60AC and CW60AH.

== Service history ==
Union Pacific Railroad 7391, an example of the 106 "Convertibles" built for Union Pacific Railroad with the 7FDL engine. This was renumbered to 7065 then to 7052.

The initial locomotives suffered from various mechanical problems with the most severe being the engine itself. There were major vibration problems which were addressed by increasing the engine mass to lower the resonant frequency. This in turn, caused problems with the twin turbochargers. These problems caused GE to push back full production of the new model until 1998. Changes such as stiffer materials and increased engine wall thickness (to increase mass) were in place at full production.

CSX Transportation had re-powered many of their AC6000CW units from 16-7HDL engines to new GEVO-16 engines to make them more reliable and environmentally friendly. These units were capable of 5,800 hp (4,300 kW), but had been rated at 4,600 hp (3,400 kW) and classified as CW46AHs. Union Pacific also had their 16-7HDL AC6000's repowered with FDL-16's, creating an entire fleet of 4,400-hp AC6000CWs.

Beginning in 2018, Union Pacific had begun sending its AC6000CWs to GE for rebuilding. The rebuilt units are classified as C44ACMs. By 2023, all of the units have been rebuilt.

By 2024, CSX had scrapped or sold off all of their AC6000 units except for three of their pre-production AC6000CWs that were repowered with FDL16 engines. The rest were either sold off to leasing company Progress Rail Services (PRLX), the Western New York and Pennsylvania Railroad (WNYP), Wabtec, or scrapped.

=== World record ===
On June 21, 2001, all eight of the Australian mining company BHP Billiton's Mount Newman railway AC6000s worked together to set the world record for the heaviest and longest train. They hauled 99,734 tonnes (98,159 long tons; 109,938 short tons) and 682 wagons for 275 kilometres (171 miles) between Yandi mine and Port Hedland. The train was 7.3 km (4.5 mi) long and carried 82,000 tonnes (81,000 long tons; 90,000 short tons) of iron ore. The record still stands as of 2026. These were the only AC6000CWs that were exported outside of the United States and the most powerful locomotives to have operated in Australia.

== Operators ==
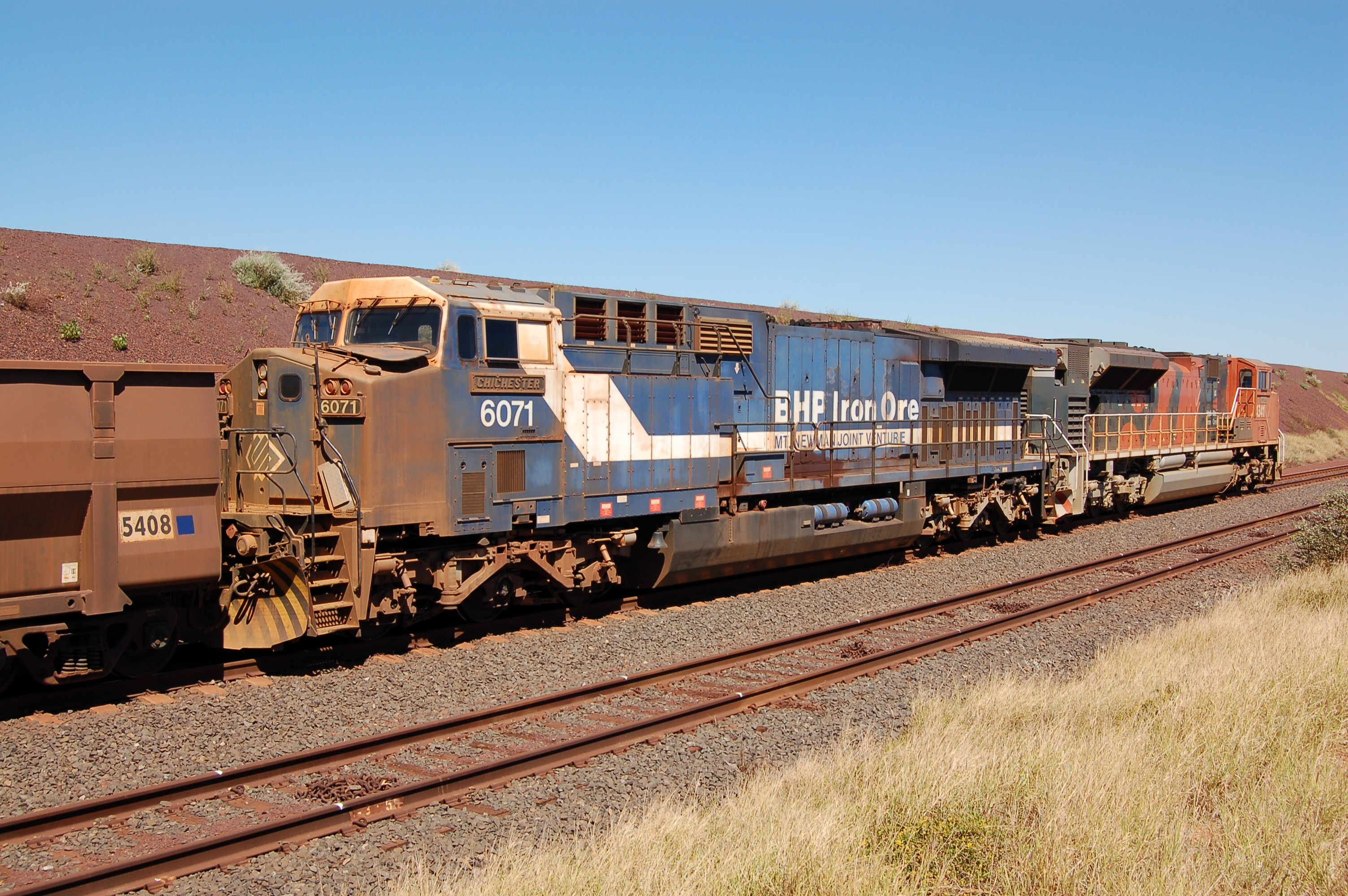
BHP Billiton's AC6000CW 6071 at Finucane Island on the Goldsworthy railway, Western Australia in April 2012, an EMD SD70ACe can be seen at right

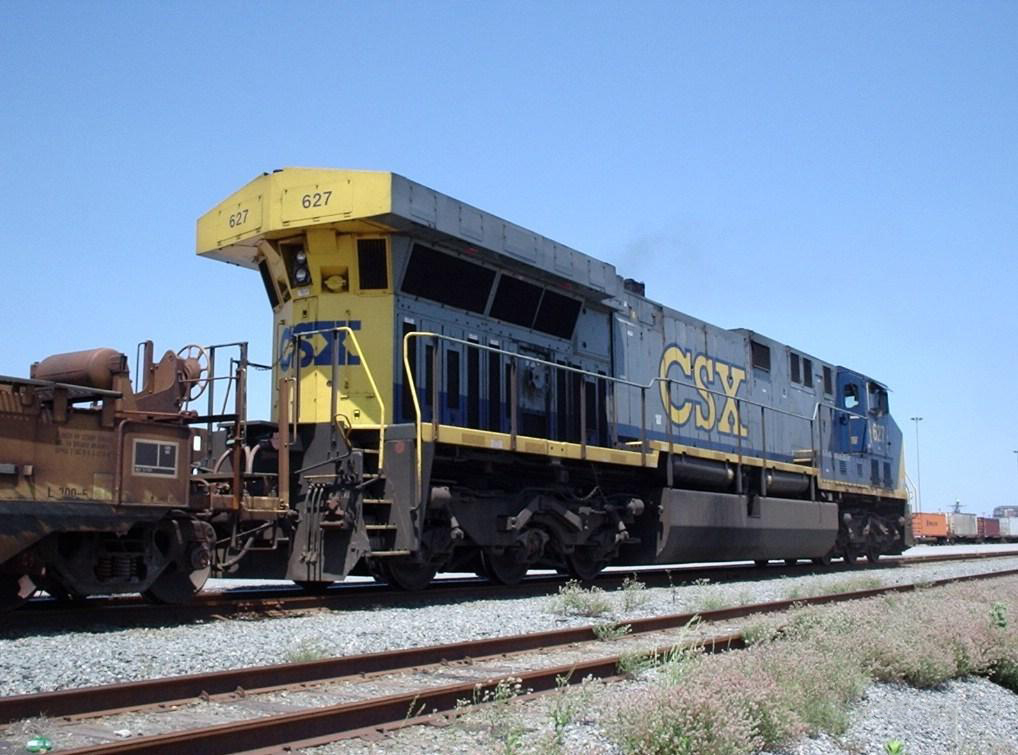
Hood end view of CSX Transportation's 627 at Pinner's Point in Portsmouth, Virginia, note the enlarged radiator section overhanging the rear of the unit

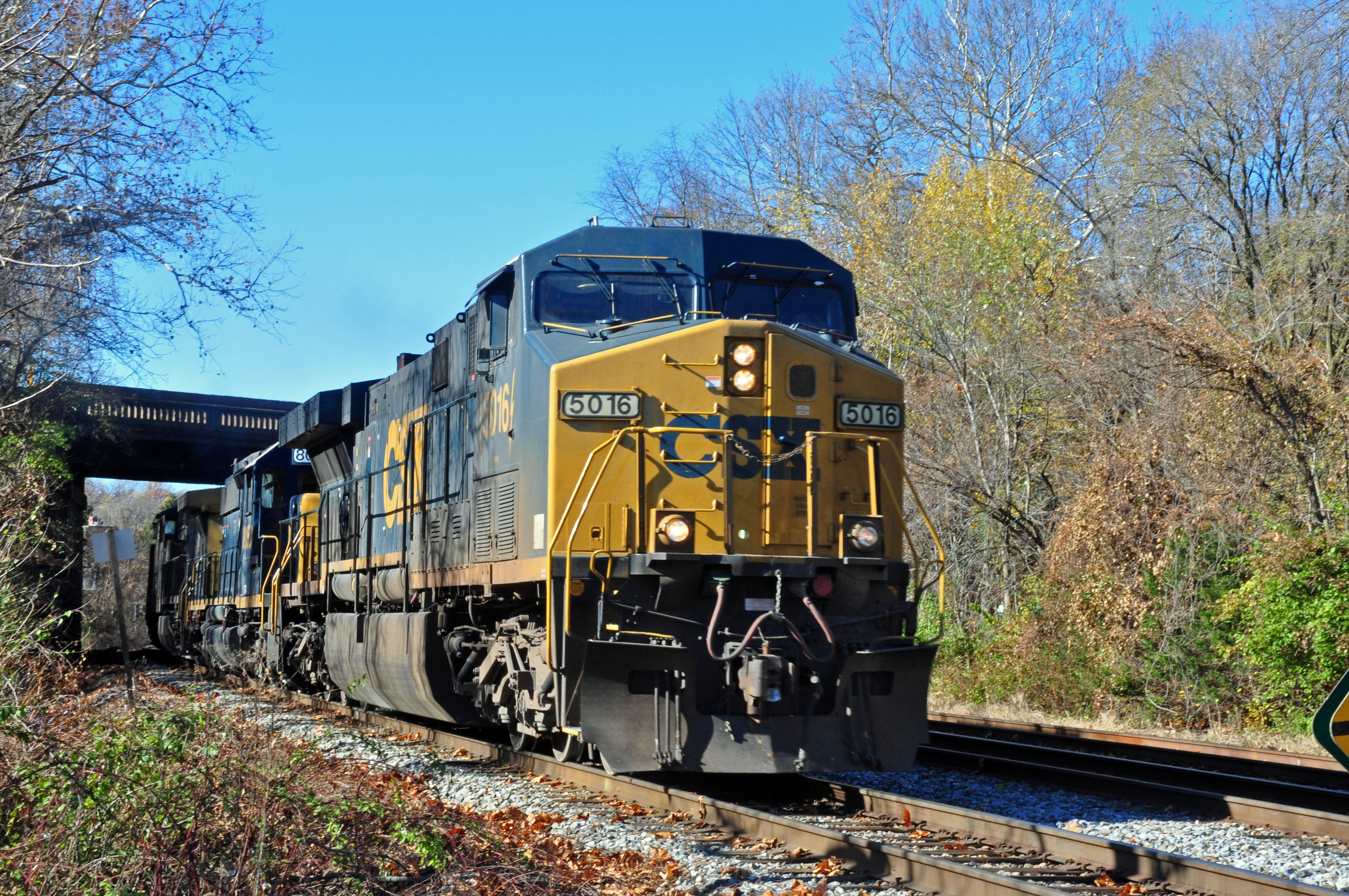
CSX 5016 (AC60CW), an example of a CW60AH

Operator	Type	Roadnumber	Num Built	Build Date	Notes
BHP Billiton (Note: The 8 units were named after towns and locations in the Pilbara region of Western Australia, where they operated.)	Standard	6070 (Port Hedland)	8	June -July 1999	Wrecked and retired in 2011.
BHP Billiton	Standard	6071 (Chichester)	8	June -July 1999	In 2013 - 2014, these were replaced by EMD SD70ACes. Despite their historical significance, all of these were eventually scrapped in late 2014 after BHP couldn't find any buyers who were interested in acquiring the locomotives.
BHP Billiton	Standard	6072 (Hesta)	8	June -July 1999	In 2013 - 2014, these were replaced by EMD SD70ACes. Despite their historical significance, all of these were eventually scrapped in late 2014 after BHP couldn't find any buyers who were interested in acquiring the locomotives.
BHP Billiton	Standard	6073 (Fortescue)	8	June -July 1999	In 2013 - 2014, these were replaced by EMD SD70ACes. Despite their historical significance, all of these were eventually scrapped in late 2014 after BHP couldn't find any buyers who were interested in acquiring the locomotives.
BHP Billiton	Standard	6074 (Kalgan)	8	June -July 1999	In 2013 - 2014, these were replaced by EMD SD70ACes. Despite their historical significance, all of these were eventually scrapped in late 2014 after BHP couldn't find any buyers who were interested in acquiring the locomotives.
BHP Billiton	Standard	6075 (Newman)	8	June -July 1999	In 2013 - 2014, these were replaced by EMD SD70ACes. Despite their historical significance, all of these were eventually scrapped in late 2014 after BHP couldn't find any buyers who were interested in acquiring the locomotives.
BHP Billiton	Standard	6076 (Mount Goldsworthy)	8	June -July 1999	In 2013 - 2014, these were replaced by EMD SD70ACes. Despite their historical significance, all of these were eventually scrapped in late 2014 after BHP couldn't find any buyers who were interested in acquiring the locomotives.
BHP Billiton	Standard	6077 (Nimingarra)	8	June -July 1999	In 2013 - 2014, these were replaced by EMD SD70ACes. Despite their historical significance, all of these were eventually scrapped in late 2014 after BHP couldn't find any buyers who were interested in acquiring the locomotives.
CSX Transportation	Standard	600-602	3	December 1995	600 - 602's original prime movers were replaced with 4,400 hp (3,300 kW) 7FDL-16 engines. This is due to these units being pre-production models and mechanical differences between them and the production model. Only 602 kept their hi-ad trucks, while 600 - 601 had self-steering trucks. CSX #600 originally had hi-ad trucks, but had later changed to self-steering trucks.
CSX Transportation	Standard	603-699, 5000-5016	114	October 1998-April 2000	CSX #603-699, and #5000-5016's original prime movers were replaced with 4,600 hp (3,400 kW) 16 cyl. GEVO prime movers and new computer equipment, essentially making them ES46ACs. CSX classifies these units as CW46AHs. Both 5015 and 5016 were both classified as a CW60AH, while 603 - 699 and 5000 - 5014 were classified as CW60AC. CSX #699, #5000, and #5001 had a diversity scheme, where the "CSX" logo was originally at. No. 601 is "Spirit of Waycross", while No. #602 is "Spirit of Maryland". #600 was CSX's first CW60AC. In October 2016, CSX #5000 collided with a CSX GP40-2, No. 4402 in Chester Township, Pennsylvania. The accident damaged its nose section, as well as 4402 receiving damage too. All sold to Progress Rail. 8 units were resold to Western New York & Pennsylvania Railroad; units 6000, 6003, and 6006-6007 later returned to GECX by 2024.
Union Pacific	Standard	7500-7509	10	November 1995-December 1996	The first ten units were originally numbered 7000-7009. UP 7000 was the first AC6000CW to be ever built. All units were converted to AC4460CW units and renumbered to 6888-6968. All units were classified as C44ACCCA. By 2023, all of these units were rebuilt to C44ACM. They are the only locomotives to ever have numberboards above the cab windows, although some may even have numberboards above cab windows before being rebuilt. Union Pacific #7511 was destroyed, but rebuilt as GECX #6002, and eventually was donated to the Lake shore Railway Museum.
Union Pacific	Standard	7510-7554	45	July-December 1998	
Union Pacific	Standard	7555-7579	25	January 2001	
Union Pacific	Convertible	7336-7405	70	November 1995-September 1996	These units were renumbered to 7010-7079 to make room for ES44ACs, but are not in the same order. They were classified as C4460AC and were all rebuilt to C44ACMs later on in 2018.
Union Pacific	Convertible	7300-7335	36	March-May 1998	Classified as C4460AC, all were rebuilt to C44ACM in 2017-2018. 7312 repaired by Norfolk Southern after a wreck in 2004, receiving a NS style cab.

== Preservation ==
- GECX #6002 (ex-Union Pacific #7511) is preserved at the Lake Shore Railway Museum in North East, Pennsylvania. It was donated by GE in 2022. It is the first modern AC traction locomotive to enter preservation. A replacement #7511 (ES44AC) was fulfilled soon.

== Post Retirement ==
- The Aberdeen Carolina and Western Railway has created their "Engine Room 87" out of the scrapped husk of former PRLX 656/CSX 666 for the US Open special train.

== See also ==
- GE Evolution Series § ES44DCi/ES44ACi
- GE AC4400CW
