= GE Dash 9 Series =

Series of American diesel-electric locomotive models

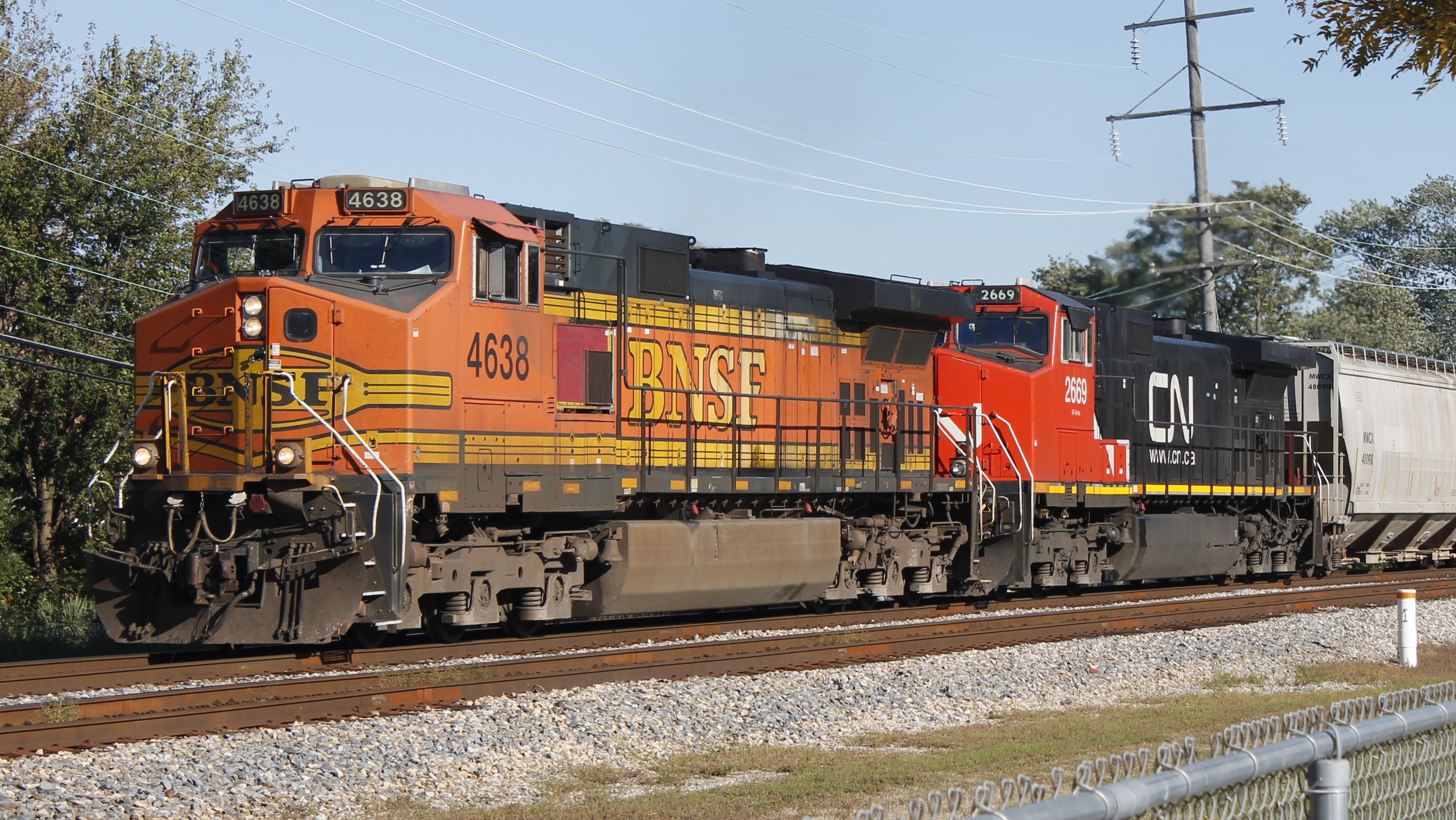
- A pair of GE C44-9W locomotives with BNSF Railway No. 4638 leading, and Canadian National No. 2669 trailing.
Type and origin
- Power type: Diesel-electric
- Builder: GE Transportation, UGL Rail
Specifications
- Configuration
  - AAR: C-C (C40-9, C40-9W, C44-9W, C-38AChe); B+B-B+B (Dash 9-40BBW)
- Gauge: 4 ft 8 1/2 in (1,435 mm)
- Trucks: GE HiAd
- Length: 73 ft 2 in (22.30 m)
- Fuel capacity: 4,600 US gal (17,400 L) (C40-9, C40-9W); 5,300 US gal (20,100 L) (C44-9W)
- Prime mover: GE 7FDL16
- Engine type: 45° V16, four stroke cycle
- Aspiration: Turbocharged
- Alternator: GE
- Traction motors: GE
- Cylinders: 16 (C40-9, C40-9W, C44-9W)
- Transmission: Alternator, silicon diode rectifiers, DC traction motors
- Gear ratio: 6.984:1
Performance figures
- Power output: 4,000 hp (2,980 kW) (C40-9, C40-9W, Cv40-9i, Dash 9-BBW); 4,400 hp (3,280 kW) (C44-9W); 5,100 hp (3,800 kW) (C-38AChe)
Career
- Operators: See text
- Locale: North America, Australia, Brazil, China
- Disposition: Most still in service, many being rebuilt to AC44C6M

The Dash 9 Series is a line of diesel locomotives built by GE Transportation. It replaced the Dash 8 Series in the mid-1990s, and was superseded by the Evolution Series in the mid-2000s. Dash 9 series locomotives are some of the most common in the United States.

== Specifications ==
The Dash 9 Series is an improved version of the Dash 8 Series. Like that earlier Series, it has a microprocessor-equipped engine control unit, and a modular system of construction of the vehicle body.

All models of the Dash 9 Series are powered by a 16-cylinder, turbocharged, GE 7FDL 4-stroke diesel engine, with electronic fuel injection and split cooling.

Dash 9 Series locomotives also ride on HiAd (high adhesion) trucks, with low weight transfer characteristics and microprocessor controlled wheelslip.

== Six axle models ==
=== Common feature ===
A specification common to all Dash 9 Series six axle models is the AAR wheel arrangement known as C-C.

=== C40-9 ===
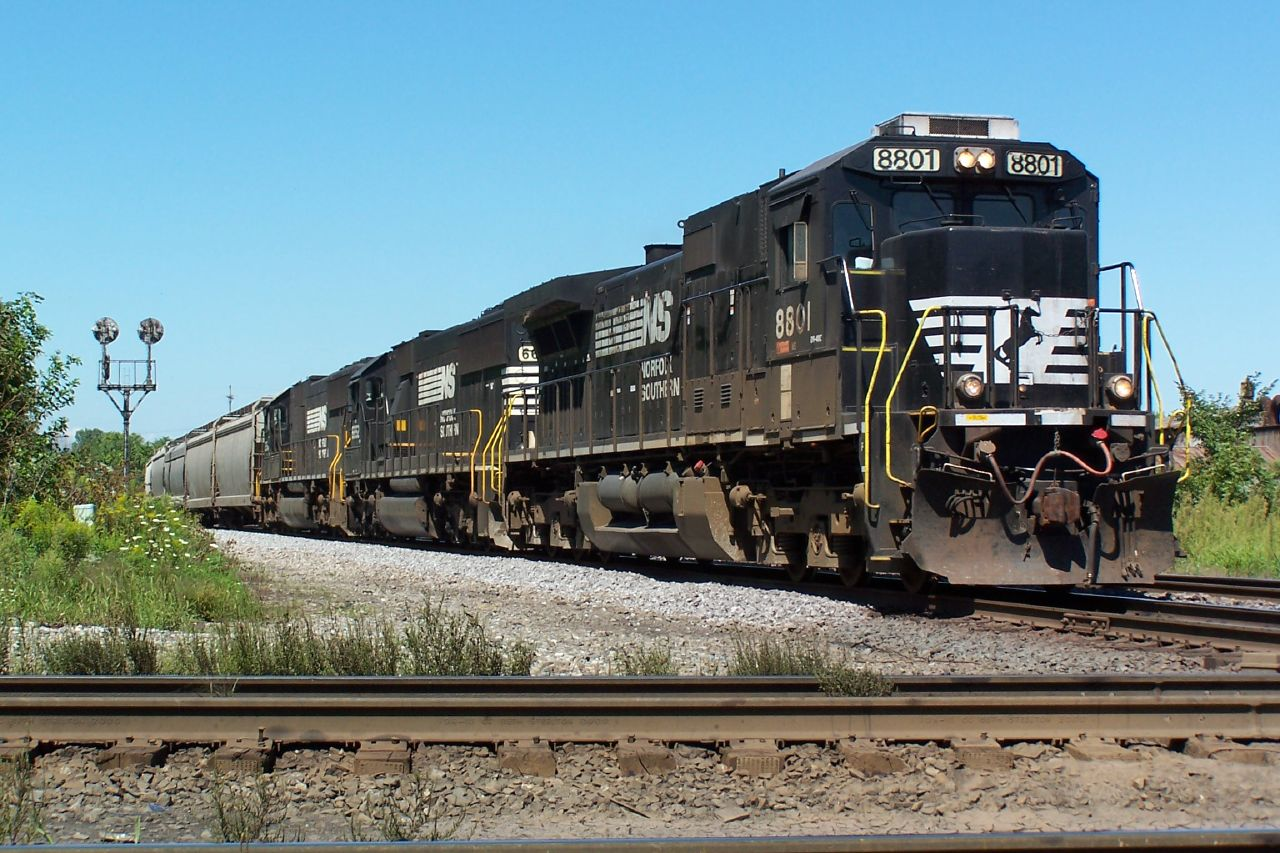
NS C40-9 # 8801

This version of the Dash 9 was manufactured between January and March 1995. All 125 examples of this model are owned by the Norfolk Southern Railway.

The C40-9 is the only model in the Dash 9 Series to feature the standard cab design. All were built with rooftop-mounted air conditioners which gives them a rather unusual and distinctive look - and were quickly coined "top hats" by the railfan community. Other than the standard cab, the model is identical in all specifications to the wide-nose "North American" safety cab Dash 9-40CW (or C40-9W) model (see below).

NS specifically requested the standard cab, and may have purchased more units had the Federal Railroad Administration not required it to purchase the wide-nose C40-9W version instead. Besides, standard cab GE's had become more expensive by the mid-1990s, since they were now considered optional equipment by the builder, and thus priced as such, and when a carrier is purchasing one or two hundred units of a particular model at a time, even a slight extra price for a customized cab can add hundreds of thousands of dollars to the cost of a locomotive order.

In 2015, the railroad announced the locomotives would be given a new wide cab, A.C. traction motors, cab signals, LSL and uprated to 4400 HP. The new locomotives will be designated as AC44C6M. The last of the "top hats" were rebuilt to AC44C6M's in November 2018.

- Power output: 4,000 hp (2,980 kW)

=== C40-9W ===
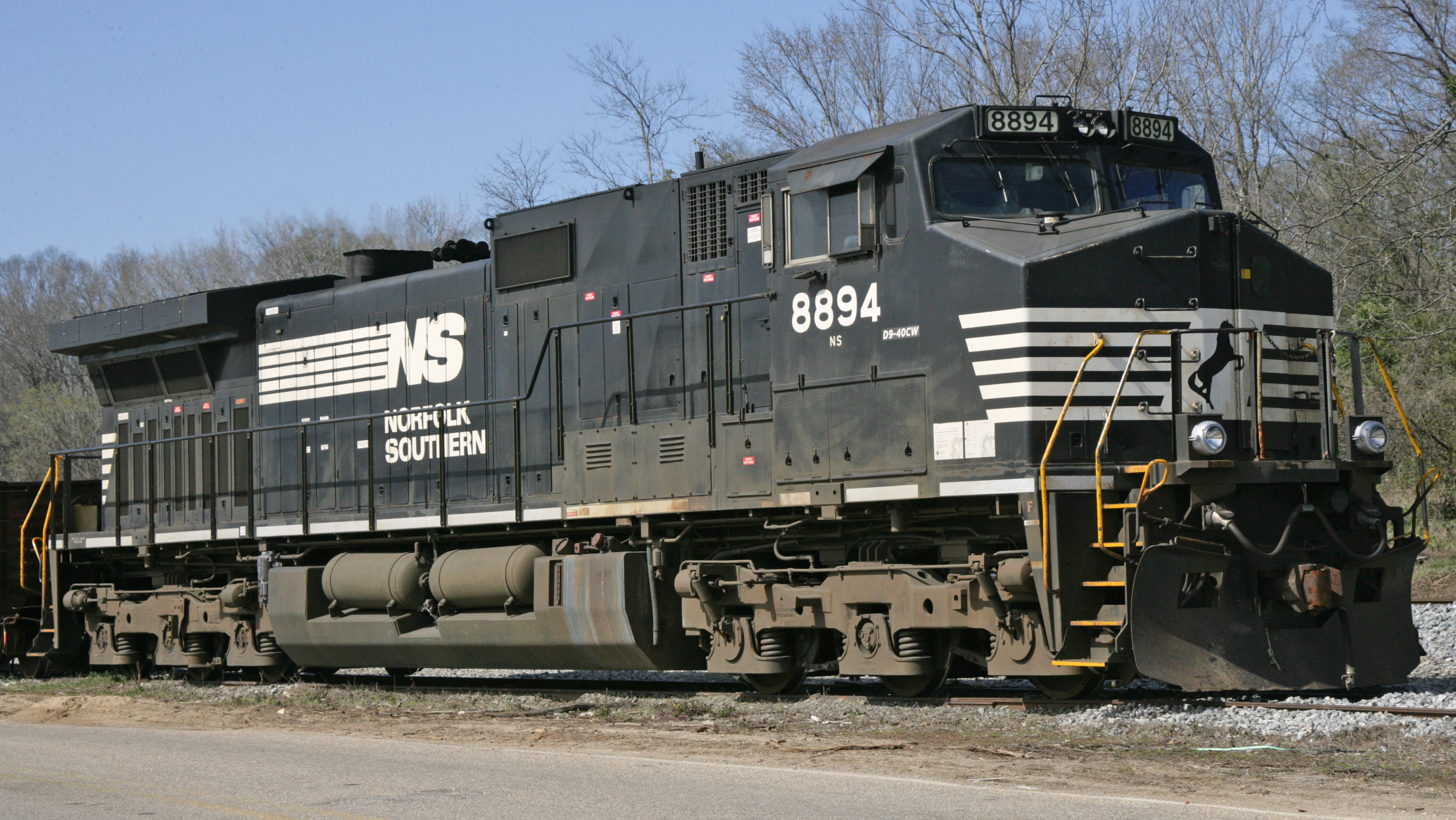
NS C40-9W no. #8894

All 1,090 units of this model were built for the Norfolk Southern Railway, as road numbers 8889 to 9978. The orders for these units were basically an extension of NS's previous order for the standard cab Dash 9-40C (or C40-9) (see above). They were built under the same premise that a lower power rating than the 4,400 hp (3,300 kW) rating of the Dash 9-44CW (or C44-9W) (see below) would prolong the life of the engine, and use less fuel. However, there is a manual override switch that allows the engineer to run the engine with all 4,400 hp (3,300 kW) if necessary.

As with the C40-9, Norfolk Southern began to upgrade their C40-9W's from 4,000 to 4,400 hp and AC traction in mid-2015, making them AC44C6M's as well.

- Power output: 4,000 hp (2,980 kW)

=== C44-9W ===
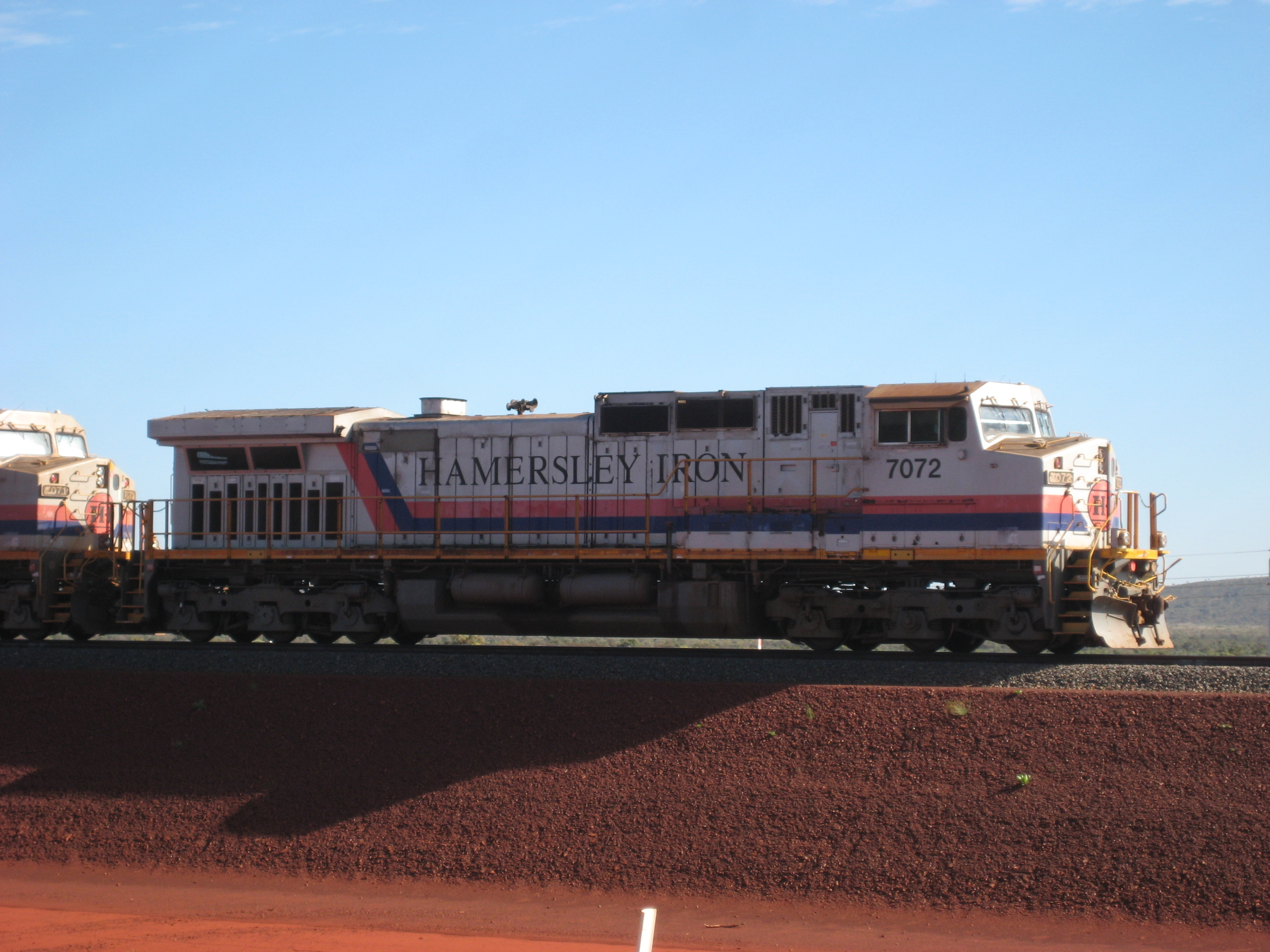
Hamersley Iron C44-9W # 7072 at the Brockman 4 mine

The C44-9W model was in production between 1993 and 2004 with 53 pre-production units being built for CSX with an extended Dash 8 carbody and trucks a couple years earlier.

Of all the Dash 9 Series models, this one received by far the greatest number of orders.

A total of 1,697 orders for C44-9W's were received from Atchison, Topeka and Santa Fe Railway and successor BNSF Railway (known at the time as the Burlington Northern Santa Fe Railway).

Other large orders from North American operators were placed by Canadian National Railway and a number of operators that have since been absorbed by the present day Union Pacific Railroad, including Chicago and Northwestern and Southern Pacific.

Substantial orders for this model were also received from operators in Australia and Brazil, in the latter case for 1,600 mm (5 ft 3 in) broad gauge versions.

General Electric and Norfolk Southern agreed to rebuild 450 of these C44-9W's, making them AC44C6M's along with their C40-9's and C40-9W's. Norfolk Southern is essentially converting all of their Dash 9 units into AC44C6M's.

- Power output: 4,400 hp (3,280 kW)

=== Cv40-9i ===
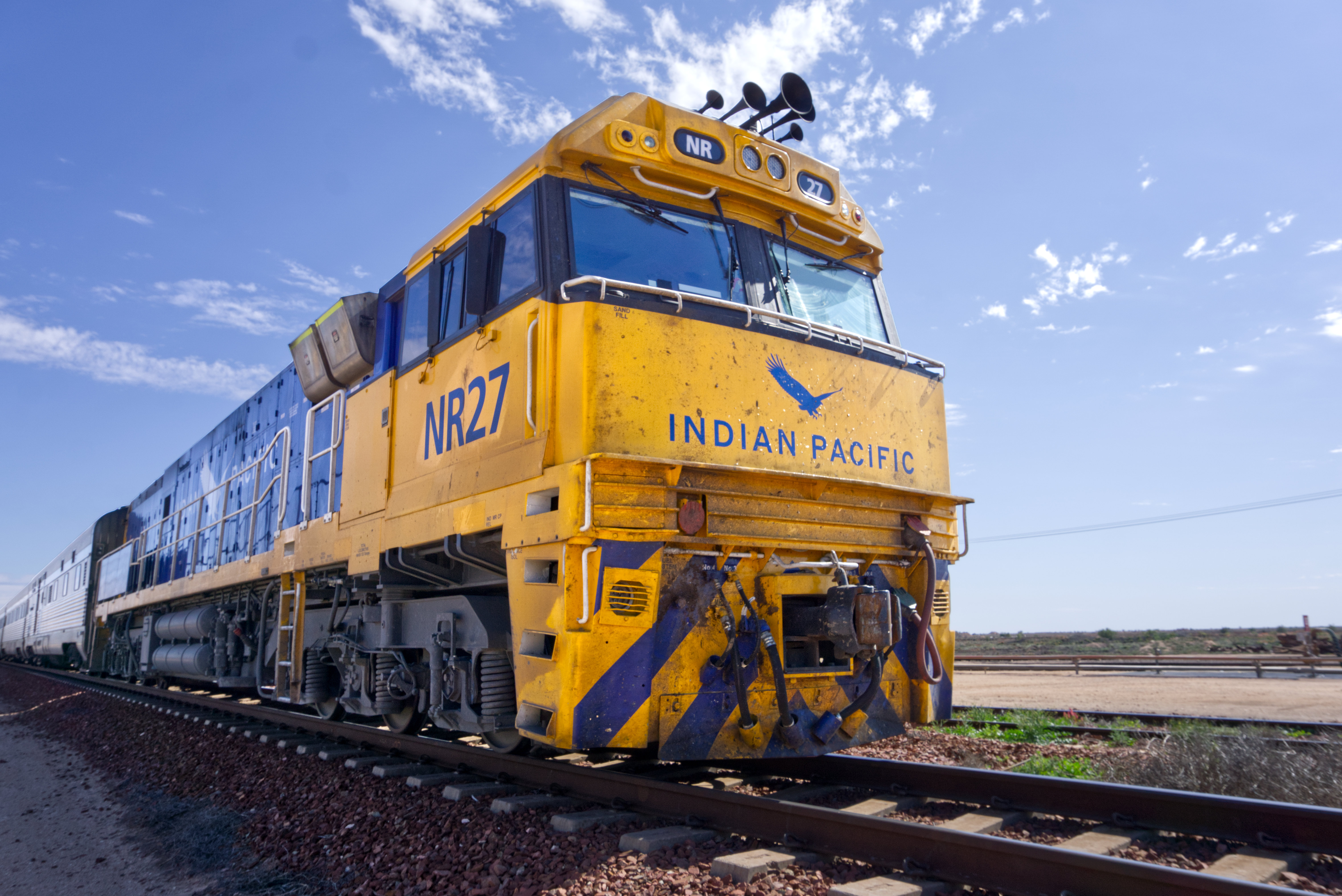
Pacific National NR27

The GE Cv40-9i model is derivative type of the Dash 9 series adapted for use in Australia. 120 units were built by UGL Rail between 1996 and 1998. This locomotive is equipped with GE 7FDL-12 and a power rating of 4000 horsepower. The maximum speed is 115 km/h.

=== C-38AChe ===
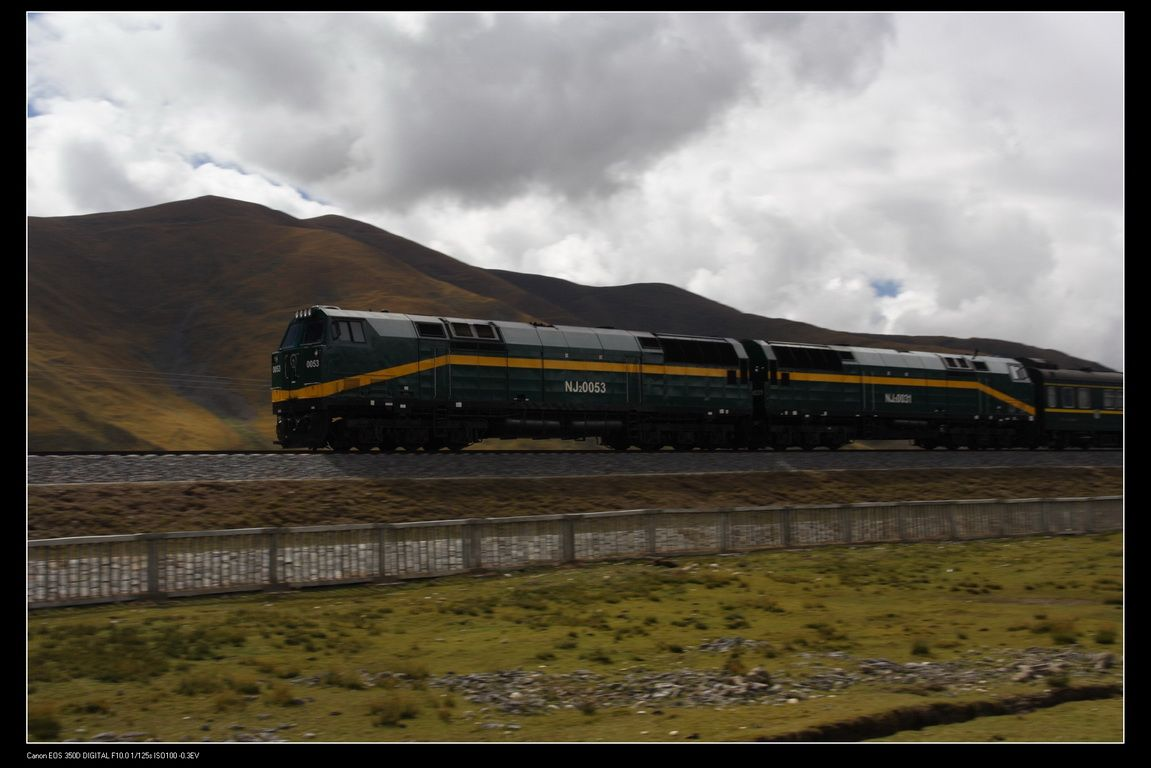
China Railway NJ2 0053

The C-38AChe, also known as the NJ2, is operated by China Railway.

Built in Erie, Pennsylvania, it is based on a standard Dash 9-44CW (or C44-9W) (see above) and marketed as the GE C38AChe.

The model was specially customised for high altitude operation on the Qinghai-Tibet Railway route.

It is used on the Qingzang Railway, which connects Xining, Qinghai Province, to Lhasa, Tibet Autonomous Region, in the People's Republic of China.

- Power output: 5,100 hp (3,800 kW)

== Eight axle model ==
=== BB40-9W ===
This is a 1,000 mm (3 ft 3 3/8 in) (meter gauge) version of the C40-9W. It was manufactured between 1997 and 2006.

298 examples of the model were built for Brazilian operators EFVM, ALL (América Latina Logística), Brado Logística and Vl! Logística.

The model is equipped with four B-style trucks, two at each end, replacing the conventional C-style trucks. The different trucks are necessary due to the railroad load limit per axle, which is 25 metric tons (55,000 lb).

The standard C40-9W traction motors cannot fit in the narrower trucks. To achieve the same total power, more of the smaller traction motors are needed.

- Power output: 4,000 hp (3,000 kW)

== See also ==
- GE AC4400CW
- List of GE locomotives
- NR class locomotives
