= List of GE reciprocating engines =

Engines that were made by GE

List of engines produced by GE Transportation Systems and GE Jenbacher (GE Energy). Where possible, recent examples of usage are shown.

== Diesel engines ==
FDL series

- GE 7FDL-8, 8-cylinder engine used in locomotives, such as the GE CM20EMP
- GE 7FDL-12, 12-cylinder engine used in locomotives, such as the GE P32AC-DM, TE8
- GE 7FDL-16, 16-cylinder engine used in locomotives, such as the GE AC4400CW, GE C44ACi

GEVO series (bore 250mm, stroke 320mm)

- GE GEVO-6, 6-cylinder engine used in locomotive repower/modernization applications
- GE GEVO-12, 12-cylinder engine used in locomotives, such as the GE ES30ACi, GE ES44AC, GE ES43ACi, GE ES43ACmi, GE C44 ESACi, 3TE25K2M and MPI HSP46 Diesel Locomotives
- GE GEVO-16, 16-cylinder engine used in locomotives, such as the GE ES59ACi, GE ES58ACi, GE ES57ACi and GE AC6000CW Diesel Locomotives.

HDL series

- GE 7HDL-16, 16-cylinder engine used in only the GE AC6000CW

L250

- GE L250 Series, 6- and 8-cylinder marine engines for propulsion and electric generator usage

PowerHaul series

- GE PowerHaul P616, 16-cylinder engine used in GE PowerHaul series locomotives.

V228 (formerly 7FDM) (Bore 9"/228.6mm, stroke 10.5"/266.7)

- GE V228 Series, 8-, 12-, and 16-cylinder marine engines for propulsion and electric generator usage

V250 (formerly 7HDM)

- GE V250 Series, 12- and 16-cylinder marine engines for propulsion and electric generator usage

== Natural gas engines ==
Jenbacher series

- INNIO Jenbacher Type 2, 8-cylinder engine for stationary power generation
- INNIO Jenbacher Type 3, 12-, 16-, and 20-cylinder engines for stationary power generation
- INNIO Jenbacher Type 4, 12-, 16-, and 20-cylinder engines for stationary power generation
- INNIO Jenbacher Type 6, 12-, 16-, and 20-cylinder engines for stationary power generation
- INNIO Jenbacher J624 GS, 24-cylinder engine for stationary power generation
- INNIO Jenbacher J920 FleXtra, 20-cylinder engine for stationary power generation

== See also ==
- List of GE gas turbine engines
