= GE Transportation =

American railroad rolling stock manufacturer

- Type: Subsidiary
- Industry: Transportation; Energy; Mining
- Founded: 1907; 119 years ago
- Headquarters: Pittsburgh, Pennsylvania, United States
- Area served: Worldwide
- Key people: Rafael Santana (President and CEO)
- Products: Evolution Series Locomotive; Dash Series Locomotive; L250 Marine Engine; 360 AC Drive Systems; 752 DC Drilling Motor; Wind Turbine Drive Systems; V228 Series engine Durathon UPS
- Revenue: US $8.2 Billion (2019)
- Number of employees: 27,000+
- Parent: Wabtec
- Divisions: Rail; Marine; Mining; Drilling; Wind; Stationary Power; Energy Storage
- Website: www.wabteccorp.com

GE Transportation is a division of Wabtec. It was known as GE Rail and owned by General Electric until it merged into Wabtec on February 25, 2019. The organization manufactures equipment for the railroad, marine, mining, drilling and energy generation industries. The company was founded in 1907. It is headquartered in Pittsburgh, Pennsylvania, while its main manufacturing facility is located in Erie, Pennsylvania. Locomotives are assembled at the Erie plant, while engine manufacturing takes place in Grove City, Pennsylvania. In May 2011, the company announced plans to build a second locomotive factory in Fort Worth, Texas, which opened in January 2013.

== Rail products ==
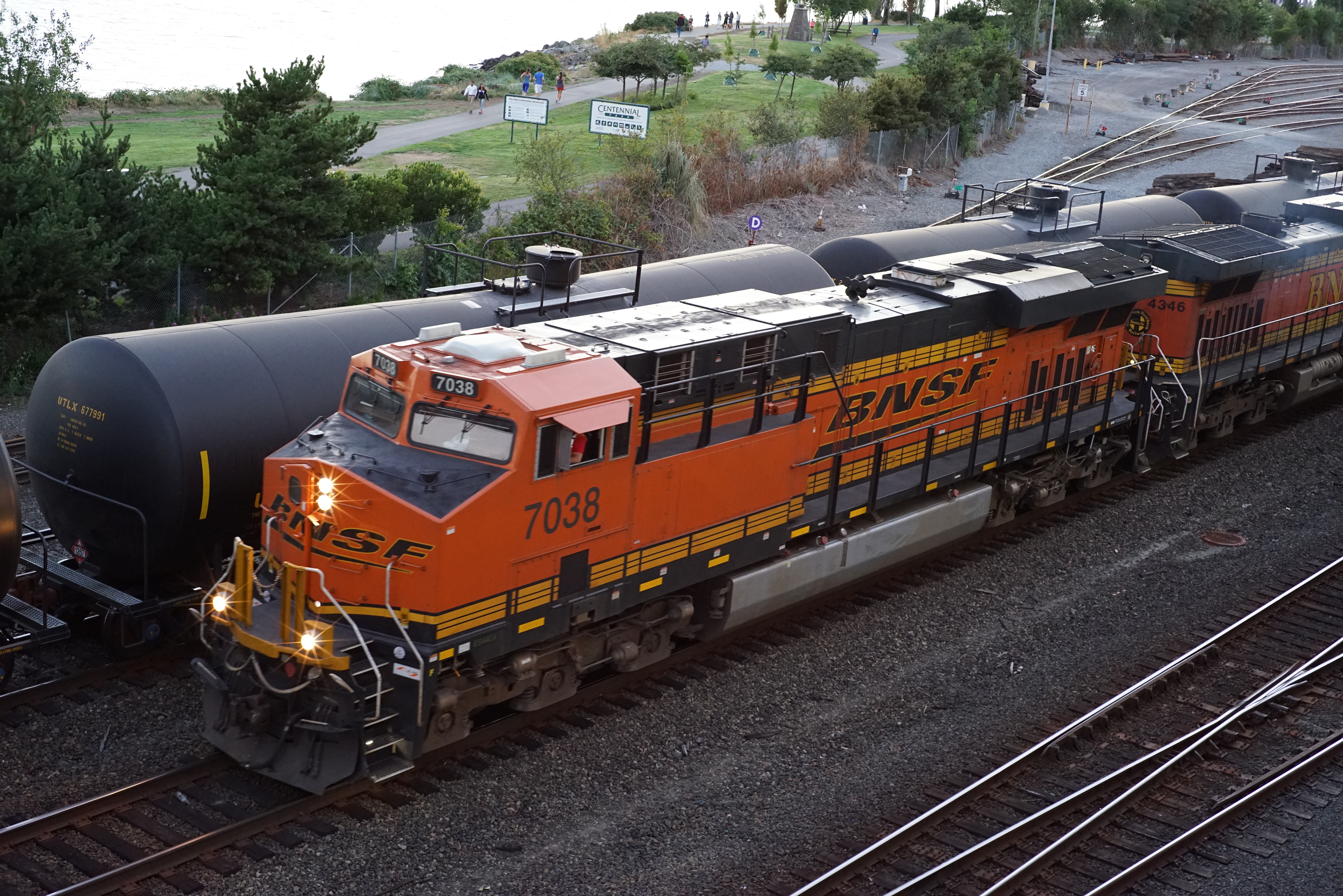
The GE ES44C4, a diesel–electric freight locomotive of the GE Evolution Series

GE Transportation is the largest producer of diesel–electric locomotives for both freight and passenger applications in North America, believed to hold up to a 70% market share of that market. The only other significant competitor is Caterpillar-owned Electro-Motive Diesel, holding an approximate 30% market share.

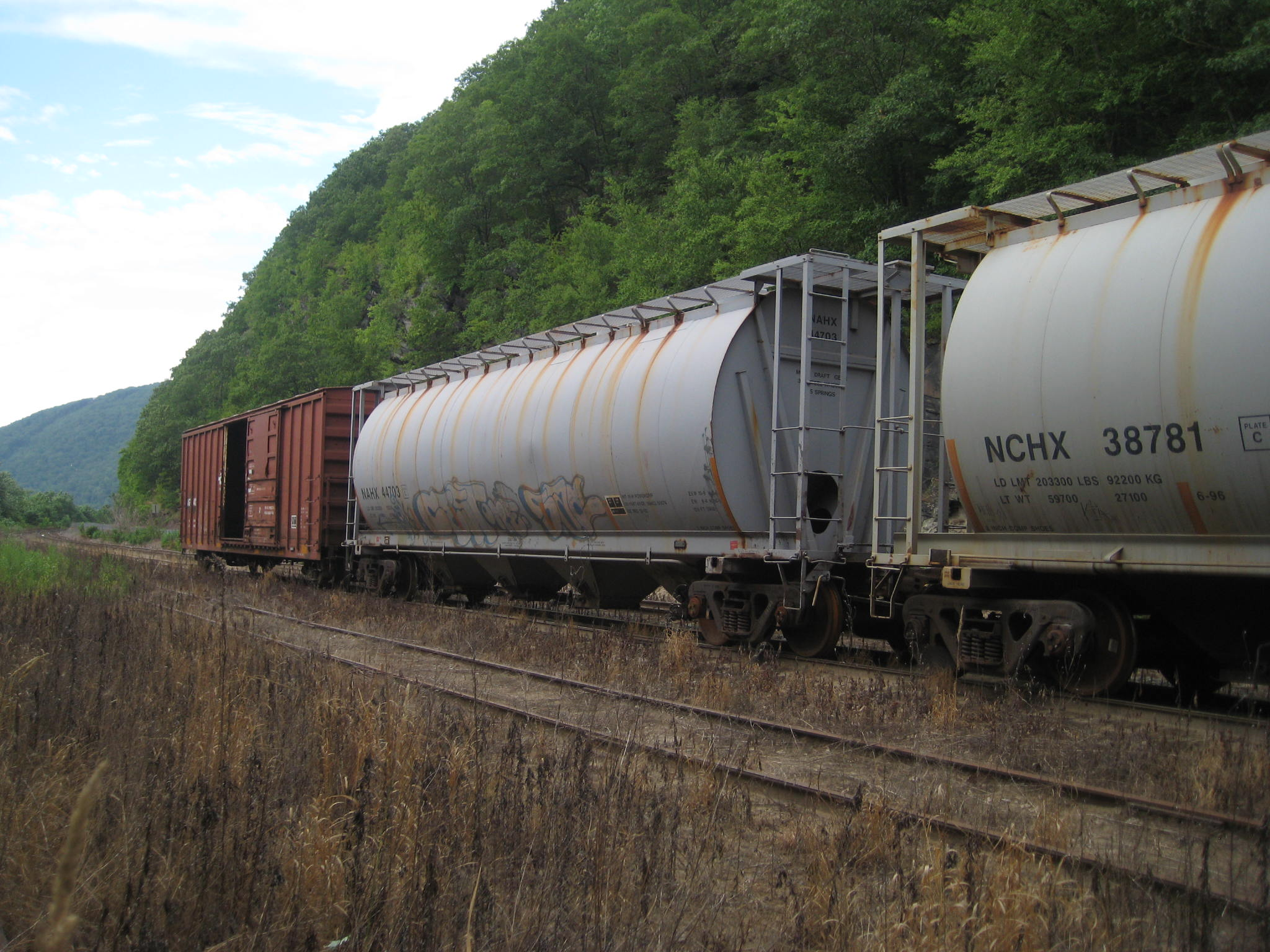
Two cylindrical hoppers built by GE Transportation

GE Transportation also produces related products, such as railroad signaling equipment, and parts for locomotives and railroad cars, as well as providing repair services for GE and other locomotives. Current locomotives in major production include the GE Evolution Series; for a complete listing, see the list of GE locomotives.

=== History ===
GE produced its first locomotive in 1912, and continued to produce switcher locomotives through the 1920s and 30s, while also producing electrical equipment for diesel engines from other manufacturers. Heavy involvement in main-line rail transportation began with a partnership with ALCo in 1940. ALCo had been the second-largest producer of steam locomotives, and was moving into diesel traction, but needed help to compete with the newly-emergent GM Electro-Motive Division. In the partnership, ALCo built the locomotive bodies and prime movers, while GE supplied the electrical gear as well as marketing and servicing infrastructure.

At first, the partnership was reasonably successful, producing the popular RS-1 road switcher, but by 1950 Alco-GE was struggling to keep up with EMD. In 1953, GE dissolved their partnership with ALCo and took over the gas turbine–electric venture that had started series production the previous year. In 1956 GE launched the Universal Series, which succeeded in establishing them as the main competitor to EMD. The subsequent Dash 7 Series failed to build market share, however the Dash 8 Series did better and by the end of the 1990s the Dash 9 Series established a market lead which the Evolution Series extended.

In the spring of 2007, GE Transportation Systems rolled out a prototype hybrid diesel–electric locomotive to increase fuel efficiency and reduce emissions. In September 2010, GE Transportation announced plans to commercialise a hybrid design by 2014–15.

On July 27, 2017, GE Transportation announced that all production of locomotives would move from Erie, Pennsylvania, to Fort Worth, Texas, by the end of 2018. However, following the merger with Wabtec, the Erie plant remained open as operations from the former MotivePower plant in Boise, Idaho, were consolidated at Erie.

== Mergers and acquisitions ==
In November 2015, French multinational Alstom, which now specialises in rail, acquired GE Transportation's Signaling & Train Control division.

On November 12, 2017, GE announced they would sell or spinoff the Transportation Division.

In addition to the railroad industry, GE Transportation, also serves the following industries: Marine, Mining, Stationary Power, Drilling, and Drivetrain Technologies (wind gear boxes).

On May 21, 2018, GE and Wabtec announced that GE Transportation, valued at $11.1 billion, would be divested from GE and subsequently merged with Wabtec in a Reverse Morris Trust transaction by early 2019. Upon completion on February 25, 2019, the merged company was 50.8% owned by Wabtec shareholders, with GE shareholders owning 24.3% and GE itself owning 24.9%; GE also received $2.9 billion in cash.

== Propulsion products ==
In addition to railroad locomotives and equipment, GE Transportation Systems also produces large electric motors and propulsion systems for the mining, oil drilling, and wind turbine industries. GE also provides medium-sized, medium-speed diesel engines for several smaller vessels, mostly tugboats and other similarly sized vessels. These marine engines are marinized versions of their locomotive engines.

== Battery products ==
GE's battery business serves the rail, marine, telecommunications and energy sectors, including new smart grid technology.
GE's Durathon battery production takes place at their facility in Schenectady, New York.

A battery locomotive is in development as of 2020.

On November 13, 2020, GE sent out its first battery electric locomotive numbered 3000 to the BNSF Railway for testing on its mainline in California between Stockton and Barstow, California. It underwent various tests throughout 2021 to see the feasibility of a fully battery powered locomotive on the California main lines

== See also ==
- List of GE reciprocating engines
- List of GE locomotives
- GE Infrastructure
