= History of rail transport in Indonesia =

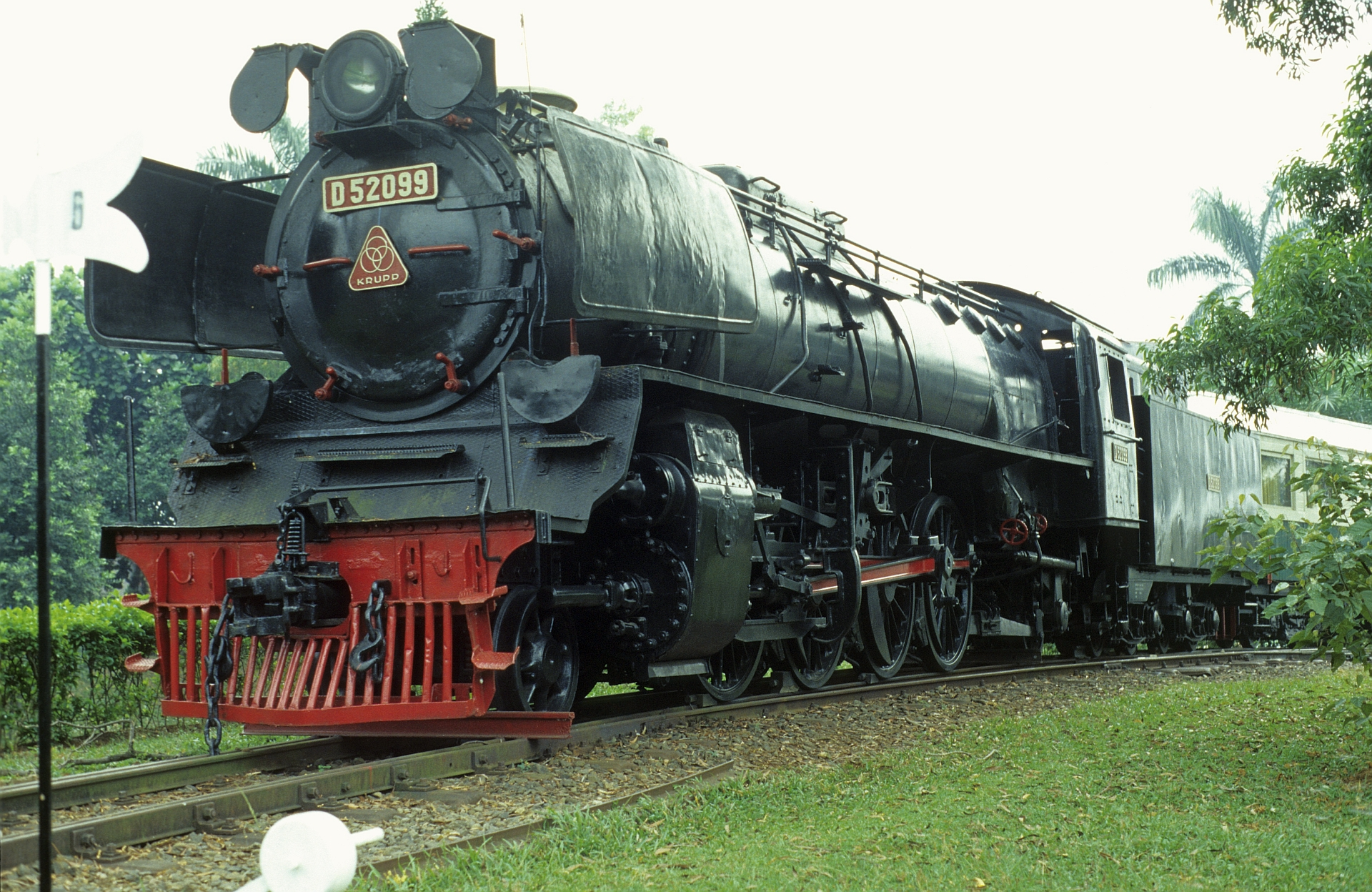
D52 Class, the only class of main-line steam locomotives bought after Indonesia's Independence on a static display at the Transport museum at Taman Mini Indonesia Indah

Indonesia's railway history began in the 19th century, when the first railway line on the city of Semarang was built. The construction of the railway line in Semarang was a personal request from King William I. It was intended for military usage, as well for the transportation of agricultural products within the region into warehouses in Semarang.

Currently, the majority of railway lines in Indonesia were constructed and inherited from the Dutch colonial rule. Following Indonesia's Independence in 1945, many lines fell into disuse or abandoned, although some were reactivated in the following decades with more being planned to be reactivated in the foreseeable future.

The current national rail operator, PT Kereta Api Indonesia (Persero), was founded on 28 September 1945, absorbing all of the previously established companies from the colonial era.

== Pre-independence era ==
=== First railway line ===
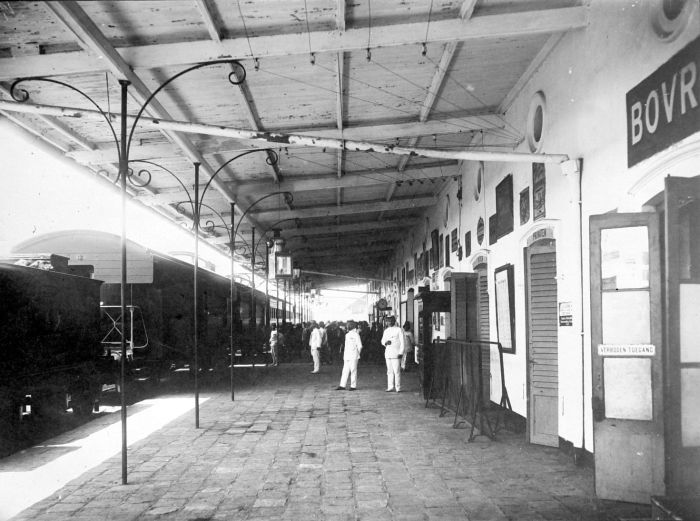
The platform of the first station of Nederlands-Indische Spoorweg Maatschappij (Dutch-Indies Railway Company) in Semarang

The idea of building a railway in modern day Indonesia has emerged since the 1840s. Indonesia (then known as the Dutch East Indies) was the second country in Asia to establish a rail transport, after India. On 7 June 1864, Governor General Baron Sloet van den Beele initiated the first railway line in Java on Kemijen village, Semarang, Central Java. It began operations on 10 August 1867 in Central Java and connected the first built Semarang station to Tanggung for 25 kilometers. By 21 May 1873, the line had connected to Solo, both in Central Java and was later extended to Yogyakarta. This line was operated by a private company, Nederlandsch-Indische Spoorweg Maatschappij (NIS or NISM) and used the 1,435 mm (4 ft 8 1/2 in) standard gauge gauge. Later construction by both private and state railway companies used the 1,067 mm (3 ft 6 in) gauge.

The liberal Dutch government of the era was then reluctant to build its own railway, preferring to give a free rein to private enterprise. But private railways could not provide the expected return of investment (even NIS required some financial assistance from the government), and the Dutch Ministry of Colonies finally approved a state railway system, the Staatsspoorwegen (SS), extending from Buitenzorg (now Bogor) in the west, to Surabaya in the east. Construction began from both ends, the first line (from Surabaya) being opened on 16 May 1878, and both cities were connected by 1894.

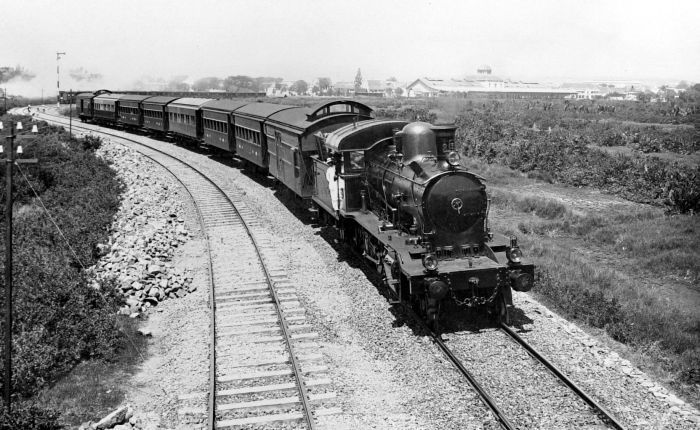
NIS standard gauge train in Java, c. 1900s

By the 1920s the system in Java had reached its greatest extent, with most towns and cities connected by rail, with branches and tramways connecting sugar plantations to factories.

The Great Depression of the 1930s put laid to plans of constructing railway lines in Borneo, Celebes, connecting the lines in Sumatra and electrification of the lines in Java.

After the Dutch state started railway construction, private enterprises did not completely get out of the picture, and at least 15 light railway companies operated in Java. These companies operated as "steam tram companies", but despite the name, were better described as regional secondary lines.

=== Java ===
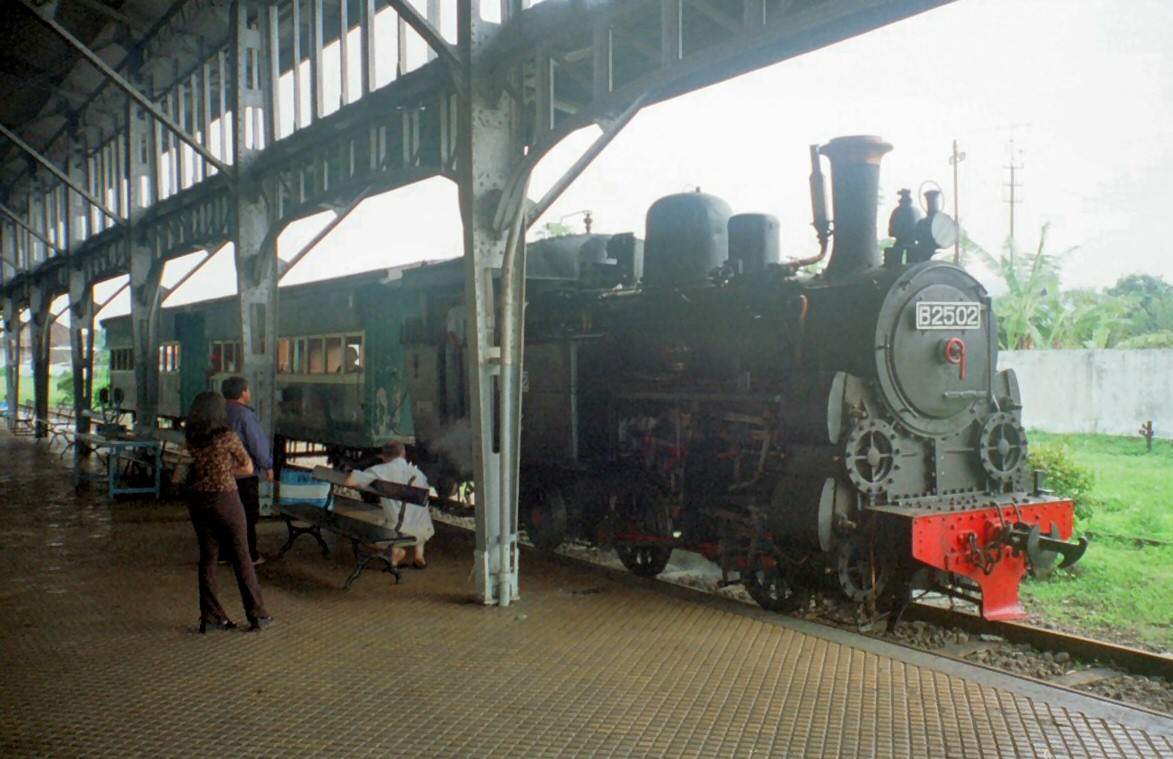
B25 02 at the Ambarawa Railway Museum

As befits a colonial enterprise, most railway lines in Indonesia had a dual purpose: economic and strategic. In fact, a condition for the financial assistance for the NIS was that the company build a railway line to Ambarawa, which connected to the one of an important military base named Fort Willem I for the Dutch king. The first state railway line was built through the mountains on the southern part of Java, instead of the flat regions on the north, for a similar strategic reason. The state railway in Java connected Anyer on the western coast of the island, to Banyuwangi on the eastern coast.

Only in the 1920s did one section, the Jakarta-Bogor line, be electrified with Dutch assistance, it would be the first ever electric rail system in Southeast Asia and the first electric commuter train service there as well. It was also the first in Southeast Asia to be operated by electric multiple units that would run for 4 straight decades, which would be defined with their European manufacture and their latter green-white livery schemes across these sets that would be adopted by the latter diesel locomotive fleet of its successors.

=== Sumatra ===
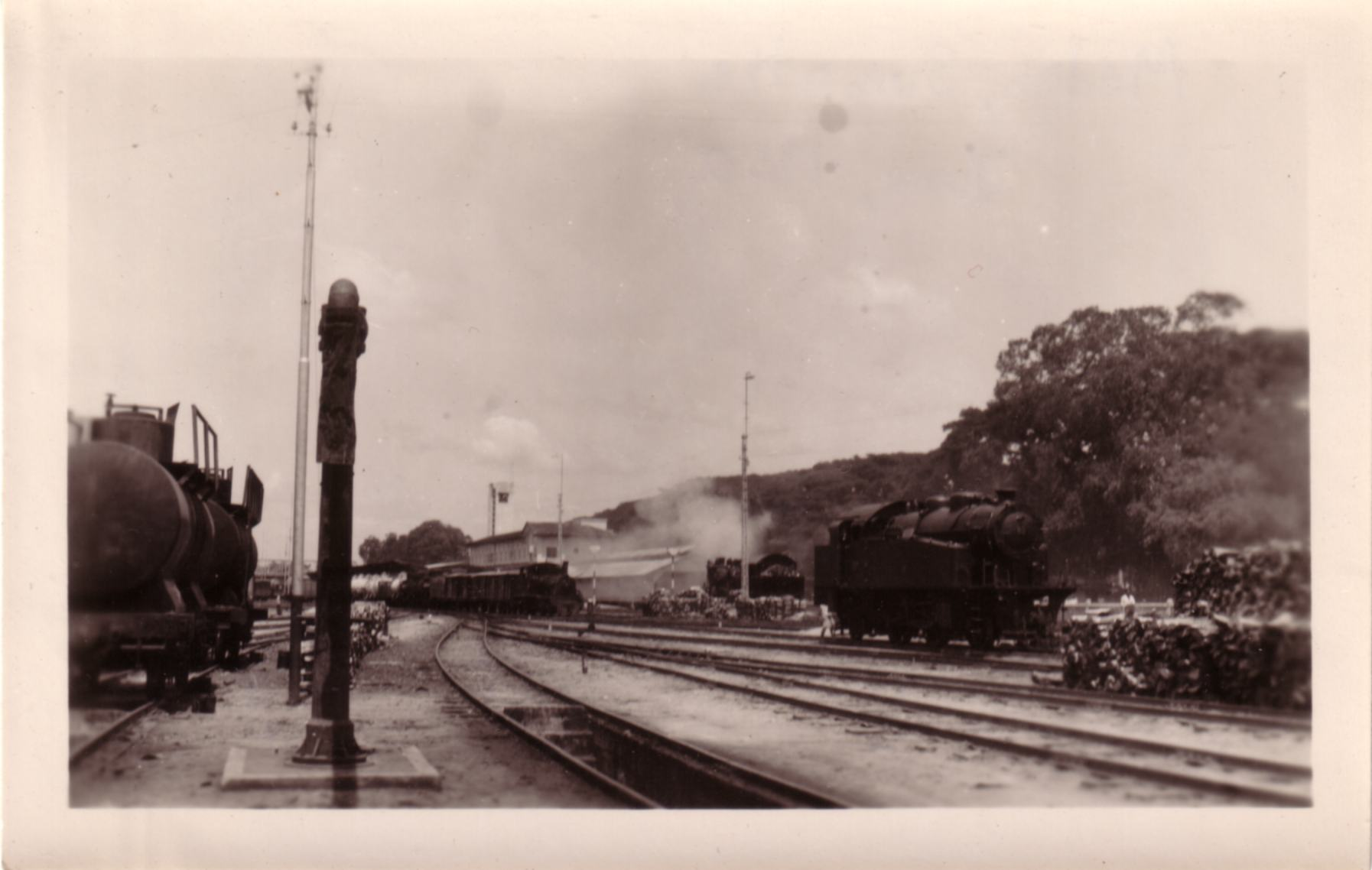
Rail yard in Medan, June 1950

In Sumatra, railways were first used for military purposes, with a railway line connecting Banda Aceh and its port of Uleelhee in 1876. This railway, the Atjeh Staats Spoorwegen (ASS), first built to a 1,067 mm (3 ft 6 in) gauge which was later regauged to 750 mm (2 ft 5 1/2 in) and extended south. This line was only transferred to the Ministry of Colonies from the Ministry of War on 1 January 1916, following the relative pacification of Aceh.

The Western Sumatra's state railway in the Minangkabau area, the Staatsspoorwegen ter Sumatra's Westkust (SSS) transported coal from inland mines to the port at Padang and was built between 1891 and 1894.

The Southern Sumatra's state railway, the Staatsspoorwegen op Zuid-Sumatra (ZSS), was completed in the 1930s. It served a fertile plantation area and an important coal mine.

Another important private railway line was the Deli Spoorweg Maatschappij (DSM). This line served regions producing rubber and tobacco in Deli.

=== Sulawesi ===
Between July 1922 and 1930, a 47 kilometres (29 mi)-long railway line operated in South Sulawesi. This line was to be extended to North Sulawesi, as part of a massive project of railway construction in Borneo and Sulawesi, connection of separate railway systems in Sumatra and electrification of the main lines in Java. The Great Depression of 1929 put paid to these plans.

=== Japanese occupation ===
During the Japanese occupation between 1942 and 1945, the different railway lines in Java were managed as one entity. The Sumatra systems, being under the administration of a different branch of the Japanese armed forces, remained separate.

The occupiers also converted the 1,435 mm (4 ft 8 1/2 in) standard gauge lines in Java into 1,067 mm (3 ft 6 in), thereby resolving the dual gauge issue. This was not an actual "problem" as there was not much transfer of materials between the systems, and much of the 1,435 mm system had been fitted with a third rail by 1940, creating a mixed-gauge railway. Many locomotives were seized and transported to Malaya, Burma and elsewhere. The railway network was reduced from 6,811 km (4,232 mi) in 1939 to 5,910 km (3,670 mi) in 1950 to provide material for railway construction in Burma.

== Independence era ==
During the war for independence between 1945 and 1949, freedom fighters took over the railways, creating the first direct predecessor to today's PT Kereta Api, the Djawatan Kereta Api Repoeblik Indonesia (Railways Service of the Republic of Indonesia), which was officially created on 28 September 1945. This date, not the 1867 one, is regarded as the birth date of Indonesian railways and commemorated as Railway Day every year, on political grounds.

On the other hand, the Dutch by Netherlands Indies Civil Administration (NICA) formed their own combined railway system to manage the railway lines located on their occupied territory, the Staatsspoorwegen/Verenigd Spoorwegbedrijf (SS/VS or Combined Railways). This company consisted of a combined state-owned and many private-owned railway companies, except Deli Spoorweg Maatschappij (Deli Railway). By the time of Dutch recognition of Indonesian independence, the SS/VS had most railway lines under their management, though not all were in operation.

With Indonesia's full independence in 1949, the separate rail systems were fused to become part of DKARI's rail network (excepting the Deli Railway), which welcomed its first diesel locomotives in 1952, which slowly displaced the steam locomotives leading to their final removal from the network in the early 80s. Non-state railway systems in Java retained their paper existence until 1958, when all railway lines in Indonesia were nationalized, including the Deli Railway, under the brand Djawatan Kereta Api (DKA) adopted early in the decade. This resulted in the formation of the Perusahaan Negara Kereta Api (PNKA: National Railway Corporation) in September 1963 on the basis of DKARI, becoming thus a state-owned enterprise with a corporate structure similar to British Rail and its neighbour's KTMB. On 15 September 1971 the name of PNKA was changed to Perusahaan Jawatan Kereta Api (PJKA, the Indonesian Railway Service Corporation).

The brief transition era from PNKA to PJKA was the time when the Greater Jakarta rail network, on orders by President Sukarno, had its electrical lines in Central Jakarta converted to steam and diesel which led to the electric trackage to be split, only for these lines be reinstated in the 1970s with the original electric locomotives remaining, which, together with their hauled stock, were replaced by a new generation of electric multiple units imported from Japan, themselves the replacements of the originals which were converted to DMUs or passenger cars on loco-hauled services in the 60s. In addition, the PNKA gained the first ever passenger overnight trains in independent Indonesia - the Bintang Fadjar, launched in 1961-62 and was replaced by the long running Bima in 1967, running the Jakarta-Surabaya route via Yogyakarta (not covered by the former, which stopped at Semarang Tawang station instead) and Surakarta, and the first true diesel multiple units, the Kuda Putih imported from East Germany, which until the early 1980s became the primary lifeline of the southern main line between Yogyakarta and Surakarta, evolving into today's two KAI Commuter lines, the diesel Prambanan Express Commuter Line and the electric KAI Commuter Yogyakarta Line, which opened in 2022. The Bima, with its East German made passenger coach and dining cars and sleeper cars, also made history as one of the first to adopt air conditioning. PNKA, however, converted two Jakarta EMU motor passenger-cab combine cars into a diesel railbus called the Railcar Perintis (one each in Jakarta and Yogyakarta) during the 1960s, one of many attempts to develop a national rail production industry.

1982 would see Industri Kereta Api - founded the year before - finally present its completed first passenger and freight car orders to the PJKA system, which began an era of Indonesian-made passenger and freight cars dominating the railway network, which continues to this day.

Later then, on 2 January 1991, PJKA was changed its name and status becoming the Perusahaan Umum Kereta Api (Perumka, the Indonesian Railways Public Corporation LLC), and since 1 June 1999, this company was changed to a joint-stock company, named PT Kereta Api (Persero) (PT KA). The Greater Jakarta commuter network was operationally separated from PT KA in 2008 by the formation of a dedicated subsidiary under the company to ensure its continued revenue operations, with PT KA itself limiting its Jakarta passenger operations to long distance and express train services. In May 2010, the company was rebranded again into PT Kereta Api Indonesia (Persero) (PT KAI, Indonesian Railways Company Ltd JSC), the name used till the present.

The headquarters of the state railway system, since Dutch colonial days, had been located in Bandung, West Java. Before the nationalization of the private railway networks in 1958, these private sector railway companies were headquartered elsewhere in the country, in Semarang, Tegal, Surabaya and Medan.

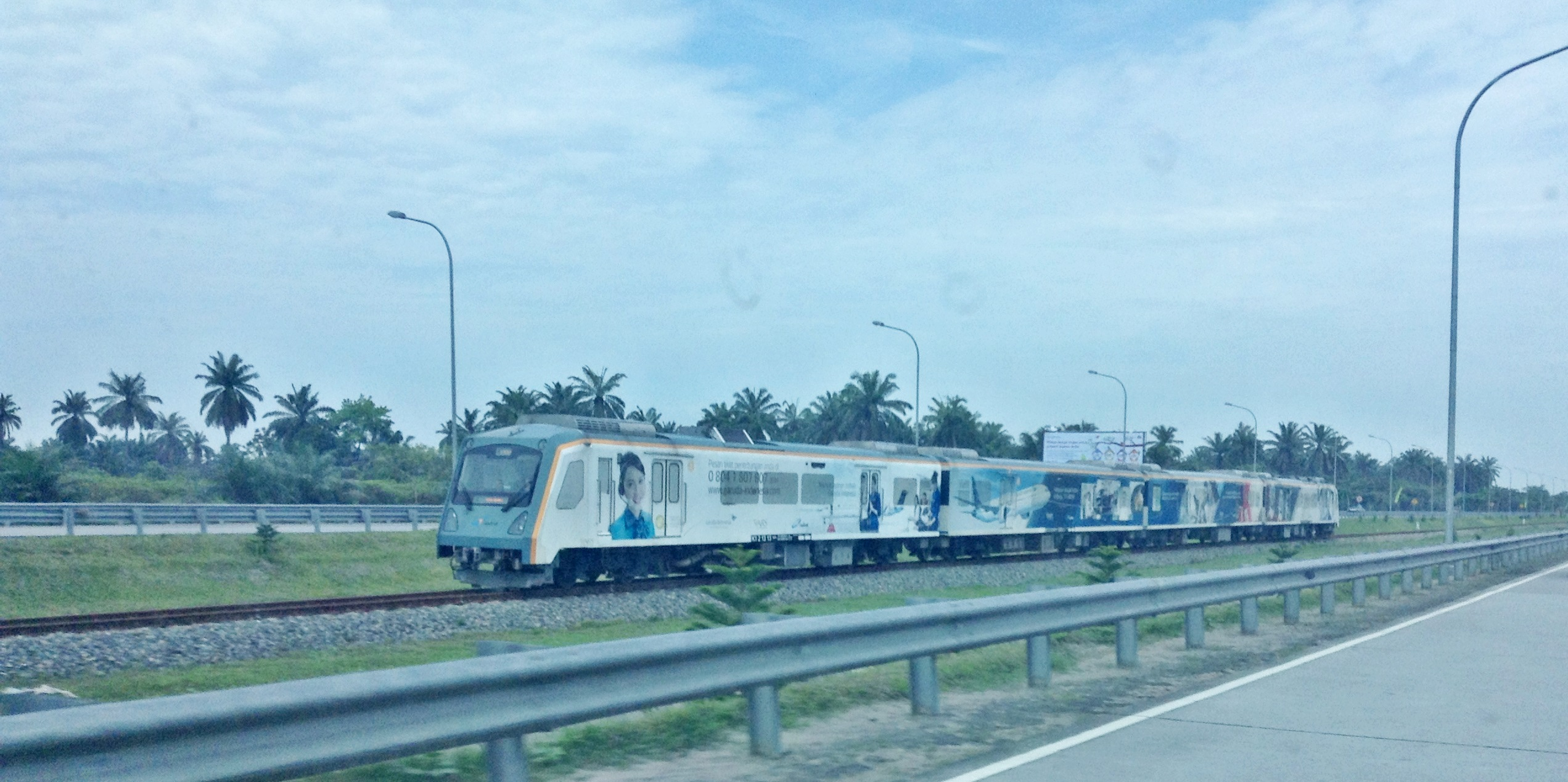
Kualanamu Airport Rail Link, the first airport rail link in Indonesia

Construction of new railway lines has been scarce. In 1997, a line was inaugurated from Citayam to Nambo in West Java. At the beginning, this line was planned to be incorporated into a larger circular line network, ranging from Cikarang to Parung Panjang. This plan had to be postponed due to the 1997 economic crisis. The first airport rail link in Indonesia, the Kualanamu Airport Rail Link, connects Medan with Kualanamu International Airport, which was inaugurated on 4 September 2013. The Soekarno–Hatta Airport Rail Link was opened between Soekarno–Hatta International Airport and BNI City on 26 December 2017. Minangkabau Ekspres, connecting Minangkabau International Airport and Padang, was inaugurated on 21 May 2018. The Adisumarmo Airport Rail Link, connecting Adisoemarmo International Airport station and Solo Balapan, opened on 29 December 2019. Yogyakarta International Airport Rail Link, connecting Yogyakarta International Airport with Yogyakarta was completed in September 2021. The Trans-Sulawesi Railway are built with 1,435 mm (4 ft 8 1/2 in) standard gauge which is wider than the 1,067 mm (3 ft 6 in) cape gauge used in Java and Sumatra to accommodate more weight and speed, the first phase includes 146 kilometers route from Makassar to Parepare, which was completed in November 2022 and has been operating ever since, the total plan for the railway would be around 2,000 kilometres spanning from Makassar to Manado, most of other sections are still under construction.

Most new construction is concentrated on double- and quad-tracking of existing railway lines. In 2011, double-tracking of the line from Semarang to Surabaya Pasar Turi was begun. The project was finished with the double-tracking of the final segment between Bojonegoro and Surabaya Pasar Turi on 8 May 2014. The line between Manggarai and Cikarang on Rajawali-Cikampek line is being quadrupled, with the first section between Jatinegara and Cakung opened on 14 April 2019.

Trams formerly existed in Jakarta, Surabaya, Malang, and Semarang before their service was closed after independence. In Jakarta the tram lines use track gauge 1,188 mm (3 ft 10 25/32 in) operated by Bataviasche Verkeers Maatschappij and Pengangkutan Penumpang Djakarta, while in other areas track gauge 1,067 mm (3 ft 6 in) were used. In Greater Jakarta, KRL Commuterline and Jabodebek LRT is operational urban rail network, serving commuter routes which comprises cities of DKI Jakarta, Depok, Bogor, Bekasi, Tangerang, and South Tangerang as well as regencies of Bogor, Bekasi, and Lebak. The other operational urban rail networks are Jakarta provincially-owned Jakarta MRT, Jakarta LRT, and Soekarno-Hatta Airport Rail Link to support the public transport network in the area.

Indonesia today also operates a high-speed rail line connecting its two largest cities, the Jakarta–Bandung high-speed rail line, which will allow trains to reach up to 420 km/h, with operational speed of 350 km/h. Commenced operations on 2 October 2023, this High Speed Rail line is the first in Southeast Asia and is operated by a KAI subsidiary firm.

== Rail network ==
The development of the railway network from 1875 to 1925 in 4 stages:

- 1875–1888,
- 1889–1899,
- 1900–1913
- 1914–1925.

=== Network after 1875–1888 ===
Phase I development took place in 1876–1888. The beginning of the construction of the railway was in 1876, in the form of the first network in the Dutch East Indies, between Tanggung and Gudang in Semarang in 1876, along 26 km. After that, the Semarang – Gudang line began to be built. In 1880, the Batavia (Jakarta) – Buitenzorg (Bogor) line was built along 59 km, then continued to Cicalengka via Cicurug – Sukabumi – Cibeber – Cianjur – Bandung. In 1877 the Kediri - Blitar line was built, and combined with the Surabaya - Cilacap line via Kertosono – Madiun – Solo, and also the Jogya – Magelang line.

Until 1888 the railway network built was:

- Batavia – Buittenzorg – Sukabumi – Bandung – Cicalengka
- Batavia – Tanjung Priok and Batavia – Bekasi
- Cilacap – Kutoarjo – Yogya – Solo – Madiun – Sidoarjo – Surabaya
- Kertosono – Kediri – Blitar
- Sidoarjo – Malang and Bangil – Pasuruan – Probolinggo
- Solo – Purwodadi – Semarang and Semarang – Rembang
- Tegal – Balapulang

=== Network after 1889–1899 ===
Until 1899, the railway network built was:

- Djogdja – Tjilatjap
- Soerabaja – Pasoeroean – Malang
- Madioen – Solo
- Sidoardjo – Modjokerto
- Modjokerto – Kertosono
- Kertosono – Blitar
- Kertosono – Madioen – Solo
- Buitenzorg (Bogor) – Tjitjalengka
- Batavia – Rangkasbitung
- Bekasi – Krawang
- Cicalengka – Cibatu (Garut) – Tasikmalaya – Maos – Banjarnegara
- Cirebon – Semarang and Semarang – Blora
- Yogya – Magelang
- Blitar – Malang and Krian – Surabaya
- Part of the Madura line

=== Network after 1899–1913 ===
Until 1913 the rail network built was:

- Rangkasbitung–Labuan and Rangkasbitung–Anyer
- Krawang–Cirebon and Cikampek–Bandung
- Pasuruan–Banyuwangi
- The entire Madura network
- Blora–Bojonegoro–Surabaya

=== Network after 1913–1925 ===
Until 1925 the rail network built was:

- Remaining Java Island line
- Jatinegara–Tanjung Priok electrification
- Batavia–Bogor electrification:
- South Sumatra: Panjang–Palembang and
- West Sumatra: around Sawahlunto and Padang
- North Sumatra: Tanjung Balai–Medan–Pematangsiantar; and Medan–Belawan–Pangkalansusu.
- Sulawesi: Makasar–Takalar and Makasar–Maros–Sinkang plan
- North Sulawesi: Manado–Amurang plan
- Kalimantan: Banjarmasin–Amuntai plan; and Pontianak–Sambas plan.

For Kalimantan and Sulawesi, it was not implemented because construction was only going to start in 1941 and World War II broke out.

=== Station Construction Period ===
Here is a list of major stations:

1. Karanganyar Station – inaugurated 1887
2. Jakarta Kota Station – inaugurated 1929
3. Tanjung Priok Station – 1914
4. Gambir Station (formerly Weltevreden) – 1914
5. Jatinegara Station (formerly Meester Cornelis)
6. Manggarai Station – 1969
7. Pasar Senen Station – 1916
8. Cikampek Station – 1894
9. Bogor Station – 1881
10. Depok Station – 1881
11. Bandung Station – 1887
12. Yogyakarta Station – 1887
13. Solo Balapan Station – 1876
14. Semarang Tawang Station – 1873
15. Cirebon Station – 1920
16. Madiun Station – 1897
17. Purwokerto Station – 1922
18. Malang Station – 1941
19. Surabaya Kota Station – 1878 and renovation 1911
20. Surabaya Gubeng Station – 1913
21. Pasar Turi Station – 1938
22. Kertosono Station

=== Batavia – Buitenzorg electric train network 1918 ===
Bogor Station (Buitenzorg) was built in 1880 as part of the construction of the Buitenzorg - Soekaboemi - Tjiandjoer - Tjitjalengka line. However, the electric train network only existed in Batavia (Jakarta) to Buitenzorg (Bogor) which was opened in 1925, which began with the Meester Cornelis (Jatinegara) to Tandjoeng Priok segment, followed by the rest of the network which would be only electrified in 1930.

== Setback era ==
In this era, PJKA continues to experience decline due to the increasing number of private car users, public transportation and the emergence of Ojek. Therefore, the government issued an annual subsidy. This subsidy is formatted for employee expenses and reducing PJKA's loss burden. and the gradual closure of all of the total branch lines at that time.

The Bintaro Tragedy on 19 October 1987 was a tragic event that worsened the bad image of PJKA as the only railway operator in Indonesia. In this tragedy, hundreds of people died while the rest were injured. Since that tragedy, the safety and comfort of its trains have been questioned. And since it occurred right smack in Greater Jakarta - in particular in the PJKA's commuter network, it was also a trigger towards more ground breaking efforts at railway reform. At the time of the incident a feasibility study was underway that would lead to the conversion of some of its electric tracks from ground level to elevated, in an effort to avoid the massive flooding that has been characteristic of the capital during the monsoon season. That elevated section, from Gambir to just south of Jakarta Kota, was opened in 1992.

=== 90s era until now ===
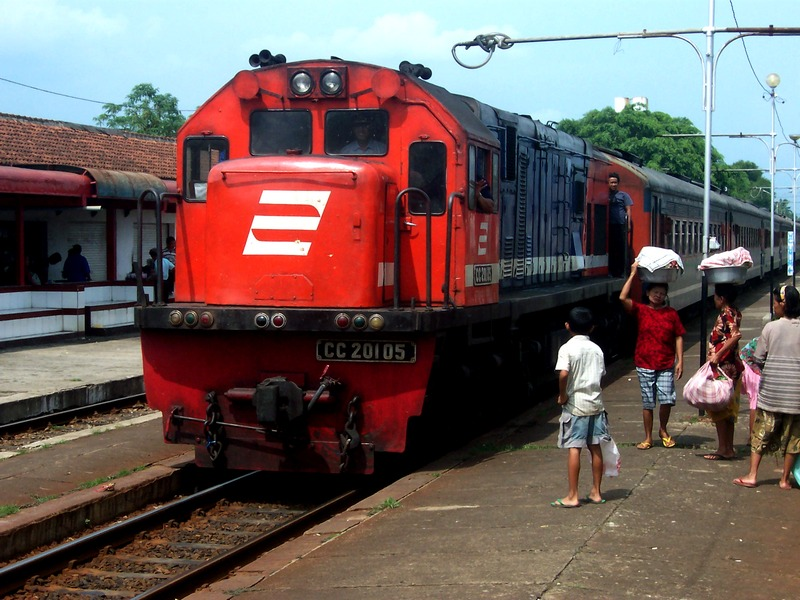
CC201 05 (CC201 77 04) when it had the Perumka logo and before being transferred

On 1 August 1990, PJKA was rebranded again to Perusahaan Umum Kereta Api (Perumka, Indonesian Railways Public Corporation LLC). During this period, with Permuka now a Public Corporation, losses such as those experienced by PJKA several years ago, especially during the dieselization of the remaining steam powered lines, could be reduced. All employees still have the status of civil servants who are regulated separately and are allowed to seek profit.

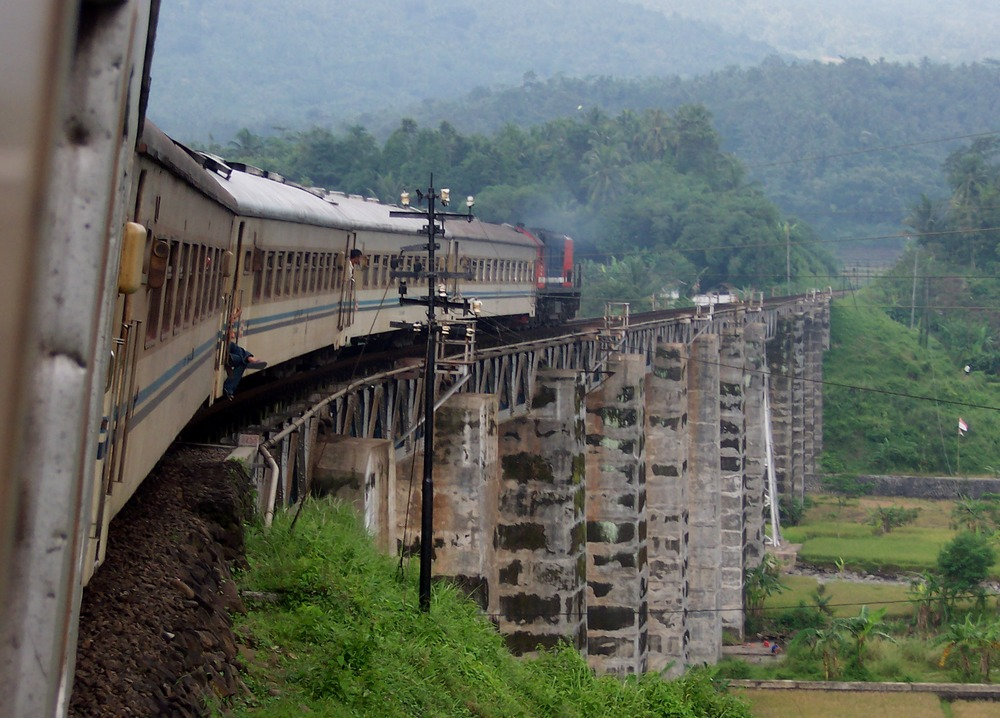
KA Bisnis Sawunggalih crosses the Sakalibel Bridge with white-yellow paint.

The Perumka era is often called the "red and blue era" because all the paint on commercially operated locomotives was changed to red and blue with a white Perumka logo on the front and back, and under the driver's cabin glass right above the license plate. In addition, the livery paint of all passenger train carriages was also changed, namely for executives it was painted light blue-dark blue, business cars dark green-dark blue, economy cars dark red-dark blue, and the generator and baggage cars plain dark blue. All the passenger train cars of the period including those Indonesian made, regardless of liveries, had white lines with a red Perumka logo on them. It was also the beginning of an era of Perumka operated commuter expresses in Jakarta across both the electric-powered and diesel powered network alike, ensuring fast services for its clientelle of passengers, only to end in 2011.

In 1995, the Argo series executive express train was born with two charter trains named Argo Bromo and Argo Gede, debuting on July 31 as part of the festivities for the 50th Golden Jubilee Year of Indonesian Independence and the Golden Jubilee of Permuka, with its consist made of an all-Indonesian made executive car design, inclusive of a dining car, manufactured for both trains by INKA in its Madiun factory. All of the first generation Argo executive trains were painted white-gray with dark blue stripes with the PT KAI logo on the left and the Ministry of Transportation insignia on the right. In addition, the CC 203 locomotive was also imported directly from the USA's GE Transportation facilities. This locomotive has an aerodynamic design.

As a result of the presence of these two Argo trains, there was a change in the color scheme, with the executive and business class cars on other trains painted with the same livery pattern as the Argo class but with a cream-white color. In 1996, a 3rd Argo express train, the Argo Lawu, debuted serving the Jakarta-Surakarta route. In 1997, as part of the 130th birthday of the Perumka network, the Argo Bromo Anggrek debuted on the same route as the Argo Bromo but sporting a pink-white livery on its consist instead of the white-gray of the original Argo Bromo that it now replaced. Meanwhile, the economy cars were actually painted white-turquoise green, but in the end only the Rheostatic EMUs operating economy class trips and some Jakarta Commuter DMUs were painted with this color scheme, while other economy cars especially on express and semi-express services outside of the Argo series were still comfortable with the red-blue livery from before 1995. The previously mentioned livery was also added with two stripes, one of which was light blue and the other dark blue.

=== Limited company era ===
In 1998, Perumka officially changed to PT Kereta Api (Persero (PT KA, Indonesian Railway Corporation JSC), although the notaryation of its establishment was carried out the following year. In the early 1990s and 2000s, PT KA maintained the red-blue paint livery on its locomotives, except for the CC 203s. At the time, PT KAI was reeling from the effects of the 1997 Asian financial crisis that led to a political crisis in Indonesia itself, with Suharto replaced by his vice president, B.J. Habbie, who had previously worked with INKA's aerospace counterpart Indonesian Aerospace and was one of those responsible for the manufacture and successful runs of the 1995 Argo series trainsets. The newly rebranded railway had debuted two new Argo class executive long-distance trains that year to show its resiliency and resistance to the effects of the crisis - the Argo Dwipangga (then the Dwipangga), which debuted a modern long-distance service on the Jakarta to Yogyakarta run, and the Argo Wilis on the Bandung-Surabaya Gubeng route, with both trains using an improved trainset manufactured by INKA applying lessons learned on the first three modern express trains. Some of the cars through on both sets were modernized sets from the past years also with INKA assistance, ensuring that a mix of past and present would inspire railway passengers on the history of the passenger trains and of the whole PT KA network in particular. During the onset of the crisis, the Argo Mulia plying the Jakarta-Semarang route serving Central Java, also with a mix of the consists as those that came later, had its first trips in Christmas 1997.

Beginning 2006, CC 201 and most other locomotives then changed their paint schemes to be like the CC 203, namely white with light blue-dark blue stripes. Meanwhile, there were changes to the entire series of passenger cars ranging from executive, business, and economy, to what can be seen today. PJKA's historic livery began to be used again for certain diesel locomotives designated heritage, which later expanded to even more locomotives, given that this livery began during the DKARI/PNKA eras of Indonesian railways and even before that with the Greater Jakarta commuter network.

During this period, PT KA introduced the PSO (public service obligation) system, especially for its economy class trainsets. This PSO replaced the previously implemented subsidy system and it worked together with the provincial governments to achieve the results of the PSO program for both KAI's local and semi-express services. In 2007, Law No. 23 of 2007 was passed, which eliminated the monopoly carried out by PT KA dejure, while for one more year PT KA maintained it de facto until the creation of what is now KAI Commuter in 2008 to serve as the operating arm for the Greater Jakarta commuter runs. This, combined with the 2005 creation of the Directorate General of Railways under the Ministry of Transportation, rended KAI to be finally separate from government administrative countrol, while being funded as a GOCC by the government, KAI Limited also runs on revenue from advertisements and the fares from paying passengers of its routes in addition to the revenue from other facilities on the railway stations, which it shares with MinTrans, which operates the railways and all rail maintenance and construction activities conducted therein.

In this era, the number of diesel hydraulic locomotives began to decrease along with PT KA's policy at that time to better maintain existing diesel electric locomotives and importing more, develop a number of new generation diesel electric and hydraulic locomotives that already use sophisticated technology in their maintenance with the help of INKA Limited. In Jakarta, PT KA was also doing its part to electrify most of its remaining non-electric network replacing diesel locomotive hauled stock and DMUs with the same EMUs on their main electric lines, while airconditioning was fully phrased in by the 2010s.

==== Transformation and digitalization ====
The era of digitalization of Indonesian railways has emerged since the 1980s. Digitalization began when the BB204 locomotive was launched in the 1980s in West Sumatra. Furthermore, CC 204 was modified from CC201 by adding a BrightStar Sirius computer so that it could mitigate damage 45 minutes before the damage occurred. In addition, in 2006 to 2011, a locomotive was made based on the CC203 design by adding a BrightStar Sirius computer at PT Inka so that the CC204 batch II was created.

In the 2010s decade, there have been many transformations at PT KA, especially when led by Ignasius Jonan. In 2010 the name of PT KA was amended becoming the present PT Kereta Api Indonesia (Persero) (PT KAI). Complaints from the public about the lack of AC in economy class trains came during the period, so in 2010 non-PSO AC economy class trains appeared with the presence of Bogowonto train as the first train of its kind in the nation, which led to a boom in AC equipped economy trains and the phrasing out of the non-AC trainsets.

On 28 September 2011, the PT KAI logo changed. Another transformation lies in the ticketing system. Tickets that were originally only available at the departure station, can now be ordered at minimarkets and ticket agents. Even more amazingly, a boarding pass system has emerged that requires passengers to bring proof of identity. In addition, station management is now very good. All medium and long-distance trains have been equipped with AC. Locomotive digitalization in Indonesia has continued to advance since CC205 and CC206 were imported to strengthen PT KAI's current fleet and also the development of the CC300 locomotive as part of this transformation and digitalization

==== Commemorating the 75th anniversary of the company's formation ====
In commemorating its 75th anniversary on 28 September 2020, PT KAI inaugurated a new logo in the form of three letters "K", "A", and "I" made in italics (depicting the company's progressive, open, and trusted character). The accent of the train track shape on the letter "A" symbolizes "hope to advance the company as the best and synergistic transportation ecosystem" and the use of two colors that have different meanings from the previous logo, namely the combination of these two colors reflects "a harmonious relationship between KAI and all stakeholders in the railway sector", with the blue color (on the letters "K" and "I") symbolizing "stability, professionalism, trustworthiness, and confidence of the company", and the orange color (on the letter "A") symbolizing "enthusiasm, creativity, and determination of the company".

As one of the mass transportation models used by millions of people, the development of railways in Indonesia is inseparable from the spotlight and weaknesses. Factors that are often of concern today are the accident rate is still relatively high both derailed carriages, collisions between trains, collisions between trains and other vehicles, floods/landslides and other problems often faced by train users. The main cause of this problem can be seen in the uneven rail facilities and maintenance, resulting in various problems. In 2009, it was recorded that 255 people were victims of train accidents, either injured or killed. Around 60% of train accidents occur at railroad crossings, which generally do not have gates or even guarded. Of the 2,923 railway crossing gates spread across the island of Java, it was recorded that around 1,192 were not guarded by officers. This means that 40% of crossings escape the supervision of PT KAI which is fully responsible for ensuring traffic safety and security as stated in Law Number 23 of 2007, articles 31, 32, 33, 34 and 124 which have been ratified by the legislature.

=== Addition of new lines ===
Since 2015, the government has planned to improve railway infrastructure in Indonesia by adding new lines, reactivating inactive lines and also making double tracks, not only in the Java corridor, but also in other corridors such as Sumatra, Kalimantan, Sulawesi and Papua.

The following is the development of railway networks outside Java from the 2015–2019 Railway Strategic Program:

==== Sumatra Island Corridor ====
Construction of Inter-City Railways/Trans Sumatra:

- New Bireun-Lhokseumawe-Langsa-Besitang railway line
- New Rantauprapat-Duri-Dumai railway line
- New Duri-Pekanbaru railway line
- New Pekanbaru-Muaro railway line
- New Pekabaru-Jambi-Palembang railway line
- New Simpang-Tanjung Api-Api railway line
- Double track Prabumulih-Kertapati railway
- Double track Baturaja-Martapura
- Muara Enim-Lahat double track railway
- Cempaka-Tanjung Karang double track railway
- Sukamenanti-Tarahan double track railway
- Rejosari/KM3-Bakauheni new railway line

Reactivation of Railway Lines:

- Binjai-Besitang
- Padang Panjang-Bukit Tinggi-Payakumbuh
- Pariaman-Naras-Sungai Limau
- Muaro Kalaban-Muaro

Upgrading of Urban Railway Lines/Double Track/Electrification:

- Medan Urban (Medan-Araskabu-Kualanamu Double Track Railway)
- Padang Urban (Padang-BIM and Padang-Pariaman)
- Batam Urban (Batam Center-Hang Nadim Airport)
- Palembang Urban (Monorail)

Airport Access Railway Construction:

- Kualanamu Airport, Medan (capacity increase)
- Minangkabau International Airport, Padang
- Hang Nadim Airport, Batam
- Sultan Mahmud Badaruddin II Airport

Construction of Port Access Railway:

- Lhokseumawe Port
- Belawan Port
- Kualatanjung Port
- Dumai Port
- Tanjung Api-Api Port
- Panjang Port
- Bakauheni Port

==== Kalimantan Island Corridor ====
Construction of Special/Coal/Port Access Railway (PPP Scheme):

- Muara Wahau-Muara Bengalon
- Murung Raya-West Kutai-Paser-Panajam Paser Utara-Balikpapan
- Puruk Cahu-Mangkatib

Construction of Intercity/Trans Kalimantan Railway:

- New railway line Tanjung-Paringin-Barabai-Rantau-Martapura-Banjarmasin
- New railway line Balikpapan-Samarinda
- New railway line Tanjung-Balikpapan
- New railway line Banjarmasin-Palangkaraya
- New railway line Palangkaraya – Sangau-Pontianak-State Border
- New railway line Samarinda-Sangata-Tanjung Redep-State Border

Construction of Airport Access Railway:

- Syamsuddin Noor Airport

==== Sulawesi Island Corridor ====
Construction of Inter-City Railway/Trans Sulawesi:

- New railway line Manado-Bitung
- New railway line Bitung-Gorontalo-Isimu
- New railway line Pare Pare-Mamuju
- New railway line Makassar-Pare Pare (Currently Segment: Mandai – Barru which will operate on 28 December 2023 including the Garongkong branch)
- New railway line Makassar-Sangatminasa-Takalar-Bulukumba-Watampone
- New railway line Mamuju-Palu-Isimu

Urban Railway Development:

- Makassar City and Surrounding Areas
- Manado City

Airport/Port Access Railway Development:

- Sultan Hasanuddin Airport
- Garonggong Port, New Makassar Port
- Bitung Port

==== Papua Island Corridor ====
- The development of a new railway line in Papua is only planned for one, namely for the Sorong-Manokwari line.

== Active railways ==
=== List of active railway in Indonesia ===
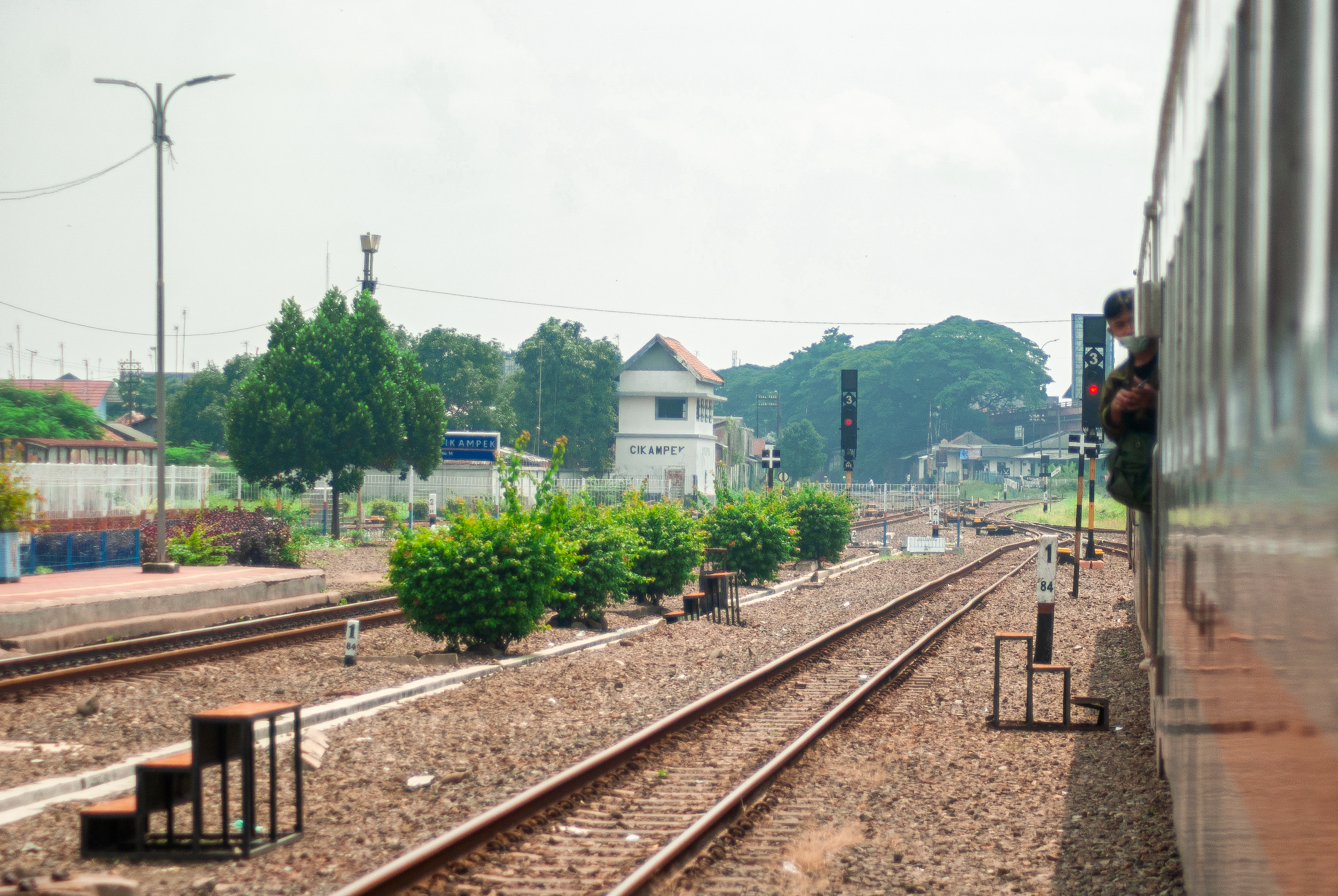
Train lines at Cikampek Station.

The following is a list of railway lines that are still active in Indonesia. This line does not include all railway lines in Indonesia; for inactive railway lines in Indonesia please see inactive railway lines in Indonesia. The list of active railway lines below is arranged according to the railway line number.

==== Java ====
Active railway lines in Java
Line number	Railway line	Segment	Date of inauguration	Company that inaugurated	Operator	Type
1	Anyer Kidul–Kampung Bandan	Tanah Abang–Rangkasbitung	1 October 1899	Staatsspoorwegen Western lines	KAI Commuter	Double
1	Anyer Kidul–Kampung Bandan	Rangkasbitung–Serang	1 July 1900	Staatsspoorwegen Western lines	KAI Commuter	Single
1	Anyer Kidul–Kampung Bandan	Serang–Krenceng with a branch towards Anyer Kidul	20 December 1900	Staatsspoorwegen Western lines	KAI Logistics	Single
1	Anyer Kidul–Kampung Bandan	Cilegon–Merak	1 December 1914	Staatsspoorwegen Western lines	KAI Commuter	Single
1	Anyer Kidul–Kampung Bandan	Jakarta–Kota Inten–Angke–Duri	2 January 1899	Staatsspoorwegen Western lines	KAI Commuter	Double
2	Tangerang–Duri	Tangerang–Duri	2 January 1899	Staatsspoorwegen Western lines	KAI Commuter	Double
2	Tangerang–Duri	Segment Batu Ceper–Soekarno-Hatta Airport	26 December 2017	KAI Commuter	KAI Commuter	Double
2	Jakarta-Cross	Tanjung Priuk–Ancol–Jakarta	2 November 1885	Western State Lines	KAI Commuter	Double
2	Jakarta-Cross	Tanah Abang–Manggarai	1 August 1922	Western State Lines	KAI Commuter	Double
3	Jakarta Kota–Cikampek	Jakarta–Pasar Senen–Jatinegara–Bekasi– Karawang	1887	Bataviasche Oosterspoorweg Maatschappij	Jakarta Operational Area I	Double (Jakarta Kota–Jatinegara)
3	Jakarta Kota–Cikampek	Jakarta–Pasar Senen–Jatinegara–Bekasi– Karawang	1887	Bataviasche Oosterspoorweg Maatschappij	Jakarta Operational Area I	Double (Jatinegara–Bekasi)
3	Jakarta Kota–Cikampek	Jakarta–Pasar Senen–Jatinegara–Bekasi– Karawang	1887	Bataviasche Oosterspoorweg Maatschappij	Jakarta Operational Area I	Double (Bekasi–Karawang)
3	Jakarta Kota–Cikampek	Karawang–Cikampek	27 December 1902	Western Railway Lines	Jakarta Operational Area I	Double
3	Cikampek–Padalarang	Cikampek–Purwakarta–Padalarang	27 December 1902	Western Railway Lines	Bandung Operational Area II	Partial double
3	Padalarang–Kasugihan	Padalarang–Bandung (with line 4)	17 May 1884	Western Railway Lines	Bandung Operational Area II	Double
4	Jakarta Kota–Bogor–Padalarang	Jakarta–Bogor	31 January 1873	Netherlands-Indies Railway	Operation Area I Jakarta (Jakarta Kota–Manggarai)	Double
4	Jakarta Kota–Bogor–Padalarang	Jakarta–Bogor	31 January 1873	Netherlands-Indies Railway	KAI Commuter (Manggarai–Bogor)	Double
4	Jakarta Kota–Bogor–Padalarang	Bogor–Cicurug	5 October 1881	Western Railways	Operation Area I Jakarta	Double
4	Jakarta Kota–Bogor–Padalarang	Cicurug–Sukabumi	21 March 1882	Western Railways	Operation Area I Jakarta	Single
4	Jakarta Kota–Bogor–Padalarang	Sukabumi–Cianjur	20 May 1883	Western Railways	Operational Area II Bandung	Single
4	Jakarta Kota–Bogor–Padalarang	Cianjur–Padalarang	17 May 1884	Western Railways	Operational Area II Bandung	Single
5	Cikampek–Cirebon Prujakan	Cikampek–Cirebon Prujakan	3 June 1912	Western Railways	Operational Area III Cirebon	Double
6, 12	Cirebon Prujakan–Prupuk–Tegal triangle	Cirebon Prujakan–Tegal	1897	Semarang-Cheribon Stoomtram Maatschappij	Operation Area III Cirebon (Cirebon–Brebes)	Double
6, 12	Cirebon Prujakan–Prupuk–Tegal triangle	Cirebon Prujakan–Tegal	1897	Semarang-Cheribon Stoomtram Maatschappij	Operation Area IV Semarang (Brebes–Tegal)	Double
6, 12	Cirebon Prujakan–Prupuk–Tegal triangle	Tegal–Prupuk (together with line 7)	1885, extended 1 July 1916	Javasche Spoorweg Maatschappij, taken over by SCS	Operation Area V Purwokerto	Single
6, 12	Tegal–Brumbung	Tegal–Semarang Tawang	1897	Semarang-Cheribon Stoomtram Maatschappij	Operation Area IV Semarang	Double
7	Cirebon Prujakan–Prupuk–Tegal triangle	Cirebon Prujakan–Prupuk	1 July 1916	Western State Railways	Cirebon Operations Area III (Cirebon–Ketanggungan)	Double
7	Cirebon Prujakan–Prupuk–Tegal triangle	Cirebon Prujakan–Prupuk	1 July 1916	Western State Railways	Purwokerto Operations Area V (Ketanggungan–Prupuk	Double
7	Prupuk–Kroya	Prupuk–Patuguran	1 January 1917	Western State Railways	Purwokerto Operations Area V	Double
7	Prupuk–Kroya	Patuguran–Kroya	1 July 1916	Western State Railways	Purwokerto Operations Area V	Double
7	Kroya–Cilacap	Kroya–Maos–Cilacap (together with lines 8 and 9)	20 July 1887	Western State Railways	Purwokerto Operations Area V	Single
8	Kroya–Kutoarjo	Kroya–Kutoarjo	20 July 1887	Western State Railways	Purwokerto Operations Area V	Double
8	Kutoarjo–Solo Balapan	Kutoarjo–Yogyakarta	20 July 1887	Western State Railways	Operational Area V Purwokerto (Kutoarjo–Jenar)	Double
8	Kutoarjo–Solo Balapan	Kutoarjo–Yogyakarta	20 July 1887	Western State Railways	Operational Area VI Yogyakarta (Jenar–Yogyakarta)	Double
8	Branch to Yogyakarta International Airport	Kedundang-Yogyakarta International Airport	27 August 2021	Directorate General of Railways	KAI Airport	Double
8	Branching to Karangtalun	Gumilir–Karangtalun	20 July 1887	Western Railway Stations	KAI Logistics	Single
9	Padalarang–Kasugihan	Bandung–Cicalengka	10 September 1884	Western Railway Stations	Operation Area II Bandung	Double (Bandung–Haurpugur)
9	Padalarang–Kasugihan	Bandung–Cicalengka	10 September 1884	Western Railway Stations	Operation Area II Bandung	Single (Haurpugur–Cicalengka)
9	Padalarang–Kasugihan	Cicalengka–Cibatu	14 August 1889	Western Railway Stations	Operation Area II Bandung	Single
9	Padalarang–Kasugihan	Cibatu–Tasikmalaya	16 September 1893	Western Railway Stations	Operation Area II Bandung	Single
9	Padalarang–Kasugihan	Tasikmalaya–Banjar	1 November 1894	Western Railway Stations	Operation Area II Bandung	Single
9	Padalarang–Kasugihan	Banjar–Kasugihan	1 November 1894	Western Railway Stations	Operational Area V Purwokerto	Single
11	Cibatu-Cikajang	Cibatu-Garut	14 August 1889	Western Railway Stations	Operational Area II Bandung	Single
13	Tegal–Brumbung	Semarang–Brumbung	1867–1873	Nederlandsch-Indische Spoorweg Maatschappij	Operational Area IV Semarang	Double
13	Brumbung–Gundih–Gambringan triangle	Brumbung–Gambringan	1912	Nederlandsch-Indische Spoorweg Maatschappij	Operational Area IV Semarang	Double
13	Gambringan–Surabaya Pasarturi	Gambringan–Surabaya Pasarturi	1912	Nederlandsch-Indische Spoorweg Maatschappij	Operation Area IV Semarang (Gambringan–Cepu)	Double
	Gambringan–Surabaya Pasarturi	Gambringan–Surabaya Pasarturi	1912	Nederlandsch-Indische Spoorweg Maatschappij	Operation Area VIII Surabaya (Cepu–Surabaya Pasarturi)	Double
14	Brumbung–Gundih–Gambringan triangle	Brumbung–Gundih	1867–1870	Nederlandsch-Indische Spoorweg Maatschappij	Operating Area IV Semarang	Single
14	Gundih–Solo Balapan	Gundih–Solo Balapan	10 February 1870	Nederlandsch-Indische Spoorweg Maatschappij	Yogyakarta Operations Area VI	Single
14	Branching to Adi Soemarmo International Airport	Kadipiro-Adi Soemarmo	29 December 2019	Directorate General of Railways, Ministry of Transportation of the Republic of Indonesia	Yogyakarta Operations Area VI	Single
14	Kutoarjo–Solo Balapan	Yogyakarta–Solo Balapan	1871–1872	Nederlandsch-Indische Spoorweg Maatschappij	Yogyakarta Operations Area VI	Double
16	Solo Balapan–Kertosono (together with line 21)	Solo Jebres–Sragen	24 May 1884	Staatsspoorwegen Oosterlijnen	Yogyakarta Operations Area VI	Double
16	Solo Balapan–Kertosono (together with line 21)	Sragen–Ngawi	1 March 1884	Staatsspoorwegen Oosterlijnen	Yogyakarta Operations Area VI (Sragen–Kedungbanteng)	Double
16	Solo Balapan–Kertosono (together with line 21)	Sragen–Ngawi	1 March 1884	Staatsspoorwegen Oosterlijnen	Operation Area VII Madiun (Ngawi–Jombang)	Double
16	Solo Balapan–Kertosono (together with line 21)	Ngawi–Madiun	2 July 1883	Staatsspoorwegen Oosterlijnen	Operation Area VII Madiun (Ngawi–Jombang)	Double
16	Solo Balapan–Kertosono (together with line 21)	Madiun–Nganjuk	1 July 1882	Staatsspoorwegen Oosterlijnen	Operation Area VII Madiun (Ngawi–Jombang)	Double
16	Solo Balapan–Kertosono (together with line 21)	Nganjuk–Kertosono	1 October 1881	Staatsspoorwegen Oosterlijnen	Operation Area VII Madiun (Ngawi–Jombang)	Double
16	Kertosono–Wonokromo (together with lines 21 and 22)	Kertosono–Sembung	25 June 1881	Staatsspoorwegen Oosterlijnen	Operation Area VII Madiun (Ngawi–Jombang)	Double
16	Kertosono–Wonokromo (together with lines 21 and 22)	Sembung–Mojokerto	27 February 1881	Staatsspoorwegen Oosterlijnen	Operation Area VIII Surabaya	Double
16	Kertosono–Wonokromo (together with lines 21 and 22)	Mojokerto–Pull	16 October 1880	Staatsspoorwegen Oosterlijnen	Operation Area VIII Surabaya	Double
16	Kertosono–Wonokromo (together with lines 21 and 22)	Pull–Along	1 July 1897	Staatsspoorwegen Oosterlijnen	Operation Area VIII Surabaya	Double
16	Kertosono–Wonokromo (together with lines 21 and 22)	Along–Wonokromo	1 July 1897	Staatsspoorwegen Oosterlijnen	Operation Area VIII Surabaya	Single
16	Kertosono–Wonokromo (together with lines 21 and 22)	Branch to Sidoarjo	16 October 1880	Staatsspoorwegen Oosterlijnen	Operation Area VIII Surabaya	Single
16	Purwosari–Wonogiri	Segment to Solo City	1892–1899	Solosche Tramweg Maatschappij	Yogyakarta Operations Area VI	Single
16	Purwosari–Wonogiri	Continuation towards Wonogiri	1 April 1922	Nederlandsch-Indische Spoorweg Maatschappij	Yogyakarta Operations Area VI	Single
20	Kandangan–Sumari	Kandangan– Indro	1914–1916	Nederlandsch-Indische Spoorweg Maatschappij	KAI Commuter	Single
21	Surabaya Line	Wonokromo–Surabaya City (together with lines 22, 23, 24)	16 May 1878	Staatsspoorwegen Oosterlijnen	Operations Area VIII Surabaya	Double
21	Surabaya Line	Branch line to Benteng (Prins Hendrik) via Sidotopo	1905	Staatsspoorwegen Oosterlijnen	KAI Logistik	Single
21	Surabaya Line	Surabaya City–Kalimas	1 January 1886	Staatsspoorwegen Oosterlijnen	KAI Logistik	Single
21	Surabaya Line	Surabaya Pasarturi–Kalimas	1912	Nederlandsch-Indische Spoorweg Maatschappij	KAI Logistik	Single
21	Surabaya Line	Surabaya Pasarturi–Gubeng shortcut	19 May 2011	Directorate General of Railways	Operations Region VIII Surabaya	Single
22	Kertosono–Bangil	Kertosono–Kediri	13 August 1882	Staatsspoorwegen Ooterlijnen	Operation Area VII Madiun	Single
22	Kertosono–Bangil	Kediri–Tulungagung	2 June 1883	Staatsspoorwegen Ooterlijnen	Operation Area VII Madiun	Single
23	Kertosono–Bangil	Tulungagung–Blitar (with line 22)	10 June 1884	Staatsspoorwegen Ooterlijnen	Operation Area VII Madiun	Single
23	Kertosono–Bangil	Blitar–Wlingi (with line 22)	10 January 1896	Staatsspoorwegen Ooterlijnen	Operation Area VII Madiun (Blitar–Kesamben)	Single
23	Kertosono–Bangil	Blitar–Wlingi (with line 22)	10 January 1896	Staatsspoorwegen Ooterlijnen	Operation Area VIII Surabaya (Kesamben–Wlingi)	Single
23	Kertosono–Bangil	Wlingi–Kepanjen SS	30 January 1897	Staatsspoorwegen Ooterlijnen	Operation Area VIII Surabaya	Single
23	Kertosono–Bangil	Kepanjen–Malang	5 January 1896	Staatsspoorwegen Ooterlijnen	Operation Area VIII Surabaya	Single
23	Kertosono–Bangil	Malang–Lawang	20 July 1879	Staatsspoorwegen Ooterlijnen	Operation Area VIII Surabaya	Single
23	Kertosono–Bangil	Lawang–Sengon	1 May 1879	Staatsspoorwegen Ooterlijnen	Operation Area VIII Surabaya	Single
23	Kertosono–Bangil	Sengon–Bangil	1 November 1879	Staatsspoorwegen Ooterlijnen	Operation Area VIII Surabaya	Single
24	Wonokromo–Bangil	Wonokromo–Bangil (with line 23)	16 May 1878	Staatsspoorwegen Ooterlijnen	Operation Area VIII Surabaya	Single
24	Bangil–Kalisat	Bangil–Pasuruan	16 May 1878	Staatsspoorwegen Ooterlijnen	Jember IX Operational Area	Single
24	Bangil–Kalisat	Pasuruan–Probolinggo	3 May 1884	Staatsspoorwegen Ooterlijnen	Jember IX Operational Area	Single
24	Bangil–Kalisat	Probolinggo–Klakah	1 July 1895	Staatsspoorwegen Ooterlijnen	Jember IX Operational Area	Single
24	Bangil–Kalisat	Klakah–Jember	1 June 1897	Staatsspoorwegen Ooterlijnen	Jember IX Operational Area	Single
25	Bangil–Kalisat	Jember–Kalisat	1 October 1897	Staatsspoorwegen Ooterlijnen	Jember IX Operational Area	Single
25	Kalisat–Banyuwangi	Kalisat–Mrawan	10 September 1902	Staatsspoorwegen Ooterlijnen	Jember IX Operational Area	Single
25	Kalisat–Banyuwangi	Mrawan–Kabat	2 February 1903	Staatsspoorwegen Ooterlijnen	Jember IX Operational Area	Single
25	Kalisat–Banyuwangi	Kabat–Ketapang	1985	State Railway Company	Jember IX Operational Area	Single

==== Terminus ====
Name	Termination station and main stops	Provinces served	Type
Whoosh	Halim, Padalarang, Tegalluar	DKI Jakarta, West Java	Main line (350 km/h)
Northern Java line	Jakarta, Cirebon, Semarang, and Surabaya	DKI Jakarta, West Java, Central Java, and East Java	Main line (120 km/h); Jakarta–Surabaya; Branch line; Semarang–Surakarta; Surabaya–Banyuwangi
Southern Java line	Bandung, Yogyakarta, Madiun, and Surabaya with branches to Cirebon and Malang	West Java, Central Java, DI Yogyakarta, and East Java	Main line (120 km/h); Bandung–Surabaya; Branch line; Cibatu–Garut; Maos–Cilacap; Cirebon–Purwokerto–Kroya; Kertosono–Blitar; Cikampek–Bandung

==== Sumatra ====
Line number	Railway line	Segment	Date of inauguration	Inaugurating company	Area of operation	Single/double?
–	Krueng Mane–Krueng Geukueh	Kr. Mane– Kr. Geukueh 1,435 mm with new station	1 December 2013	Directorate General of Railways, Ministry of Transportation of the Republic of Indonesia PT Kereta Api Indonesia (the line uses the results of joint research by the Directorate General of Railways and SNCF, France)	Divre I of North Sumatra and Aceh	Single
DSM	Belawan–Medan	Belawan–Labuan	16 February 1888	Deli Spoorweg Maatschappij	Divre I of North Sumatra and Aceh	Single
DSM	Belawan–Medan	Labuan–Medan	25 July 1886	Deli Spoorweg Maatschappij	Divre I of North Sumatra and Aceh	Single
DSM	Besitang–Medan	Kuala Bingei-Binjai–Medan	1 May 1887	Deli Spoorweg Maatschappij	Divre I of North Sumatra and Aceh	Single
DSM	Medan–Tebing Tinggi	Medan–Serdang	1 July 1889	Deli Spoorweg Maatschappij	Divre I of North Sumatra and Aceh	Single (double only Bandar Khalipah–Araskabu segment)
DSM	Medan–Tebing Tinggi	Serdang–Perbaungan	7 February 1890	Deli Spoorweg Maatschappij	Divre I of North Sumatra and Aceh	Single
DSM	Medan–Tebing Tinggi	Perbaungan–Bamban	1902	Deli Spoorweg Maatschappij	Divre I of North Sumatra and Aceh	Single
DSM	Medan–Tebing Tinggi	Bamban–Tebing Tinggi	3 March 1903	Deli Spoorweg Maatschappij	Divre I of North Sumatra and Aceh	Single
	Medan–Tebing Tinggi	Branch to Kualanamu International Airport	25 July 2013	Directorate General of Railways, Ministry of Transportation of the Republic of Indonesia	Divre I of North Sumatra and Aceh	Double
DSM	Tebing Tinggi–Kisaran	Tebing Tinggi–Kisaran	1915	Deli Spoorweg Maatschappij	Divre I of North Sumatra and Aceh	Single
	Tebing Tinggi–Kisaran	Bandar Tinggi–Kuala Tanjung branch		Directorate General of Railways, Ministry of Transportation of the Republic of Indonesia	Divre I of North Sumatra and Aceh	Single
DSM	Tebing Tinggi–Siantar		5 May 1916		Divre I of North Sumatra and Aceh	Single
DSM	Kisaran–Tanjungbalai		1915		Divre I of North Sumatra and Aceh	Single
DSM	Kisaran–Rantau Prapat–Kotapinang	Kisaran–Rantau Prapat	1937		Divre I of North Sumatra and Aceh	Single
SSS 1	Bukit Putus–Lubuk Alung	Teluk Bayur–Padang (hanya langsir)	1 Oktober 1892	Staatsspoorwegen ter Sumatra's Westkust	Divre II Sumatera Barat	Single
SSS 1	Bukit Putus–Lubuk Alung	Padang–Lubuk Alung	1 Juli 1891	Staatsspoorwegen ter Sumatra's Westkust	Divre II Sumatera Barat	Single
SSS 1	Lubuk Alung–Sawahlunto	Lubuk Alung–Kayu Tanam	1 Juli 1891	Staatsspoorwegen ter Sumatra's Westkust	Divre II Sumatera Barat	Single
SSS 2	Lubuk Alung–Naras	Lubuk Alung–Pariaman	9 December 1908	Staatsspoorwegen ter Sumatra's Westkust	Divre II Sumatera Barat	Single
SSS 2	Lubuk Alung–Naras	Pariaman–Naras	1 Januari 1911	Staatsspoorwegen ter Sumatra's Westkust	Divre II Sumatera Barat	Single
	Bukit Putus–Indarung		16 November 1979	PJKA	Divre II Sumatera Barat	Single
	Percabangan menuju Bandara Minangkabau		21 Mei 2018	Ditjen KA, Kemenhub RI	Divre II Sumatera Barat	Single
ZSS 2	Lubuklinggau–Prabumulih	Lubuklinggau–Muara Enim	1920–1933	Zuid-Sumatra Staatsspoorwegen	Divre III Palembang	Tunggal (Ganda mulai dari Muara Enim)
ZSS 2	Lubuklinggau–Prabumulih	Muara Enim–Gunung Megang	2 April 1917	Zuid-Sumatra Staatsspoorwegen	Divre III Palembang	Ganda
ZSS 2	Lubuklinggau–Prabumulih	Gunung Megang–Prabumulih	1 December 1916	Zuid-Sumatra Staatsspoorwegen	Divre III Palembang	Ganda
ZSS 1	Prabumulih–Kertapati		1 November 1915	Zuid-Sumatra Staatsspoorwegen	Divre III Palembang	Ganda
LRT	Lintas Rel Terpadu Palembang		1 Agustus 2018	Ditjen KA, Kemenhub RI	Divre III Palembang	Ganda
ZSS 1	Prabumulih–Panjang	Prabumulih–Peninjawan	15 September 1922	Zuid-Sumatra Staatsspoorwegen	Divre IV Tanjungkarang	Tunggal
ZSS 1	Prabumulih–Panjang	Peninjawan–Baturaja	1 Juli 1923	Zuid-Sumatra Staatsspoorwegen	Divre IV Tanjungkarang	Tunggal
ZSS 1	Prabumulih–Panjang	Baturaja–Martapura	16 November 1925	Zuid-Sumatra Staatsspoorwegen	Divre IV Tanjungkarang	Ganda
ZSS 1	Prabumulih–Panjang	Martapura–Negararatu	21 Maret 1927	Zuid-Sumatra Staatsspoorwegen	Divre IV Tanjungkarang	Tunggal (ganda pada segmen Cempaka–Giham)
ZSS 1	Prabumulih–Panjang	Negararatu–Cempaka	1 Mei 1926	Zuid-Sumatra Staatsspoorwegen	Divre IV Tanjungkarang	Tunggal (ganda pada segmen Cempaka–Giham)
ZSS 1	Prabumulih–Panjang	Cempaka–Kotabumi	1 Juni 1923	Zuid-Sumatra Staatsspoorwegen	Divre IV Tanjungkarang	Tunggal
ZSS 1	Prabumulih–Panjang	Kotabumi–Blambangan Pagar	2 Januari 1921	Zuid-Sumatra Staatsspoorwegen	Divre IV Tanjungkarang	Tunggal
ZSS 1	Prabumulih–Panjang	Blambangan Pagar–Haji Pemanggilan	1 Februari 1918	Zuid-Sumatra Staatsspoorwegen	Divre IV Tanjungkarang	Tunggal
ZSS 1	Prabumulih–Panjang	Haji Pemanggilan–Tegineneng	1 Februari 1917	Zuid-Sumatra Staatsspoorwegen	Divre IV Tanjungkarang	Tunggal
ZSS 1	Prabumulih–Panjang	Tegineneng–Labuanratu	1 November 1915	Zuid-Sumatra Staatsspoorwegen	Divre IV Tanjungkarang	Tunggal
ZSS 1	Prabumulih–Panjang	Labuanratu–Tanjungkarang	1 Maret 1915	Zuid-Sumatra Staatsspoorwegen	Divre IV Tanjungkarang	Tunggal
ZSS 1	Prabumulih–Panjang	Tanjungkarang–Pidada	3 Agustus 1914	Zuid-Sumatra Staatsspoorwegen	Divre IV Tanjungkarang	Tunggal
ZSS 1	Prabumulih–Panjang	Jalur menuju Tarahan		Zuid-Sumatra Staatsspoorwegen	Divre IV Tanjungkarang	Tunggal

==== Sulawesi ====
===== Makassar–Parepare =====
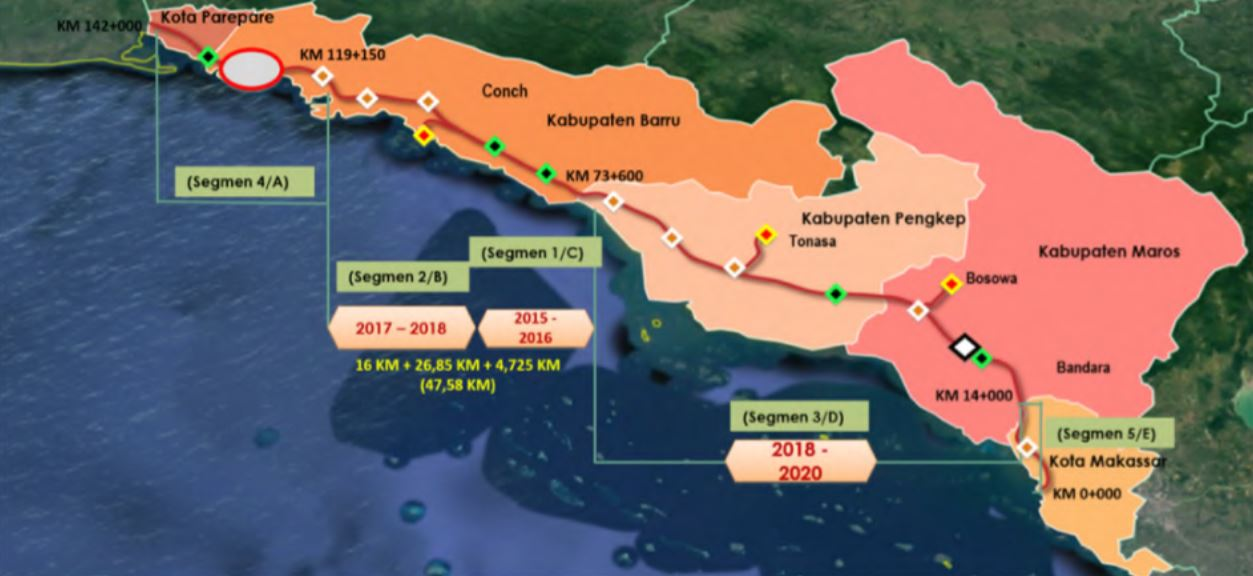
Makassar-Parepare railway map (in Indonesian)

The Makassar–Parepare railway line is a railway line approximately 145 kilometers long that connects Makassar City and Parepare City in South Sulawesi. This line is the first stage of the construction of the Trans-Sulawesi railway line. The line from Mandai Station to Garongkong Station, as well as the branch from Labakkang Station to Mangilu Station are lines that have been built and are already in operation. The ground breaking of Makassar–Parepare route was conducted on 18 August 2014 in, Siawung Village, Barru District, Barru Regency. On early November 2022, 66 kilometres (41 mi) of railway from Barru to Pangkep was inaugurated and operational. As of 2022, it is the only operational part of the railway. The provision of railway infrastructure and facilities for the Makassar-Parepare line is carried out by different operators. The provision of railway infrastructure, which includes the construction, operation, and maintenance of the railway line, is carried out by PT Celebes Railway Indonesia. Meanwhile, the provision of railway facilities is carried out by the South Sulawesi Railway Consortium, which is a joint venture between PT Kereta Api Indonesia (Persero) and PT Sulsel Citra Indonesia (Perseroda).

== Defunct ==
=== List of defunct railways in Indonesia ===
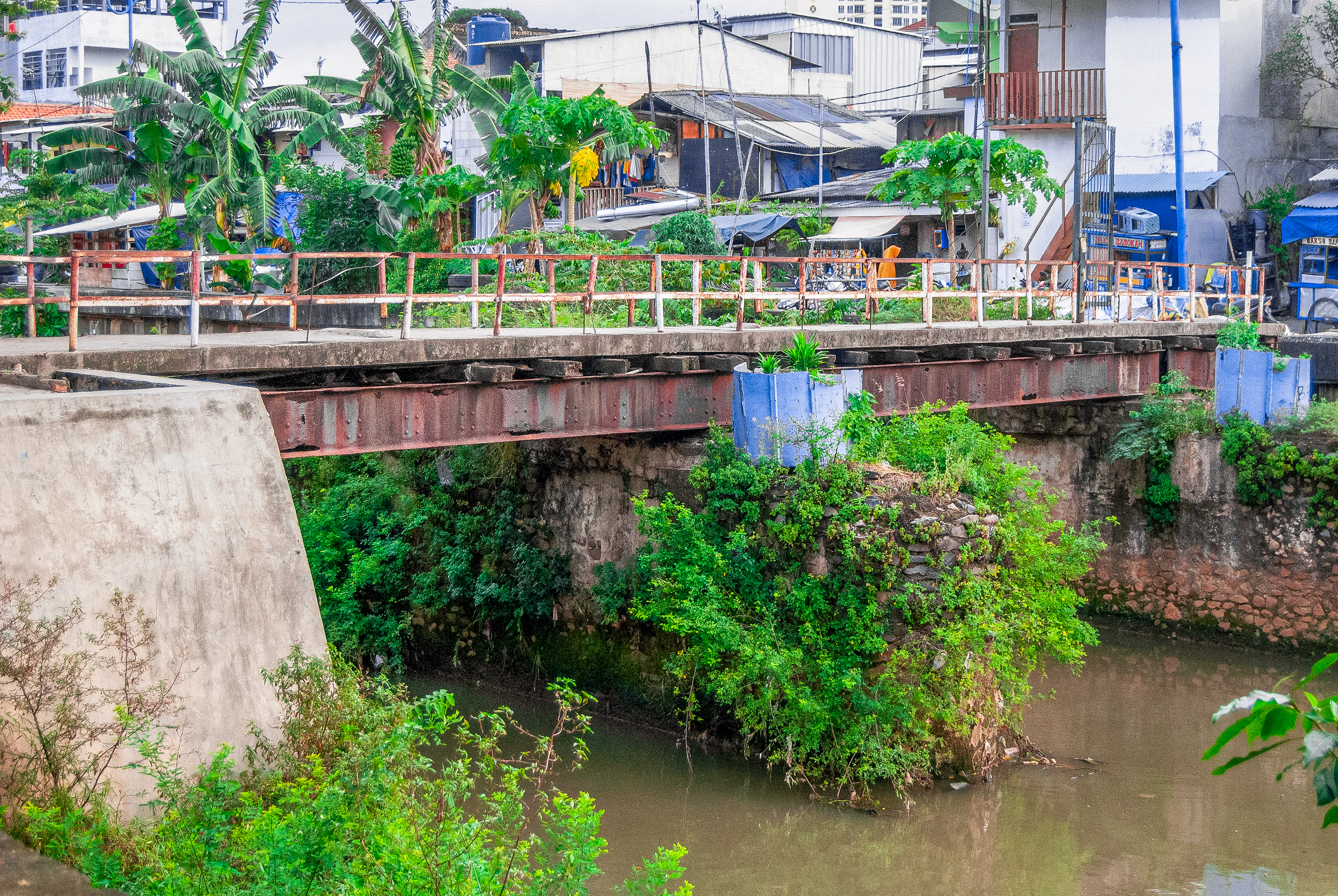
Span of the former Batavia Noord railroad bridge on the line leading to Batavia NIS Station.

Defunct railway in Indonesia are railway lines that once existed and were used as passenger transportation and/or freight transportation in Indonesia, but are now no longer functioning, and in some places, there are even no traces of them anymore.

According to data from the Ministry of Transportation of the Republic of Indonesia as of 2017, there are 2,723 kilometers of inactive railway lines in Indonesia out of a total of 8,157 kilometers that were in operation as of 1939. So that within a period of 78 years (1939–2017), there is a tendency for a decrease in the infrastructure of the operated railway lines.

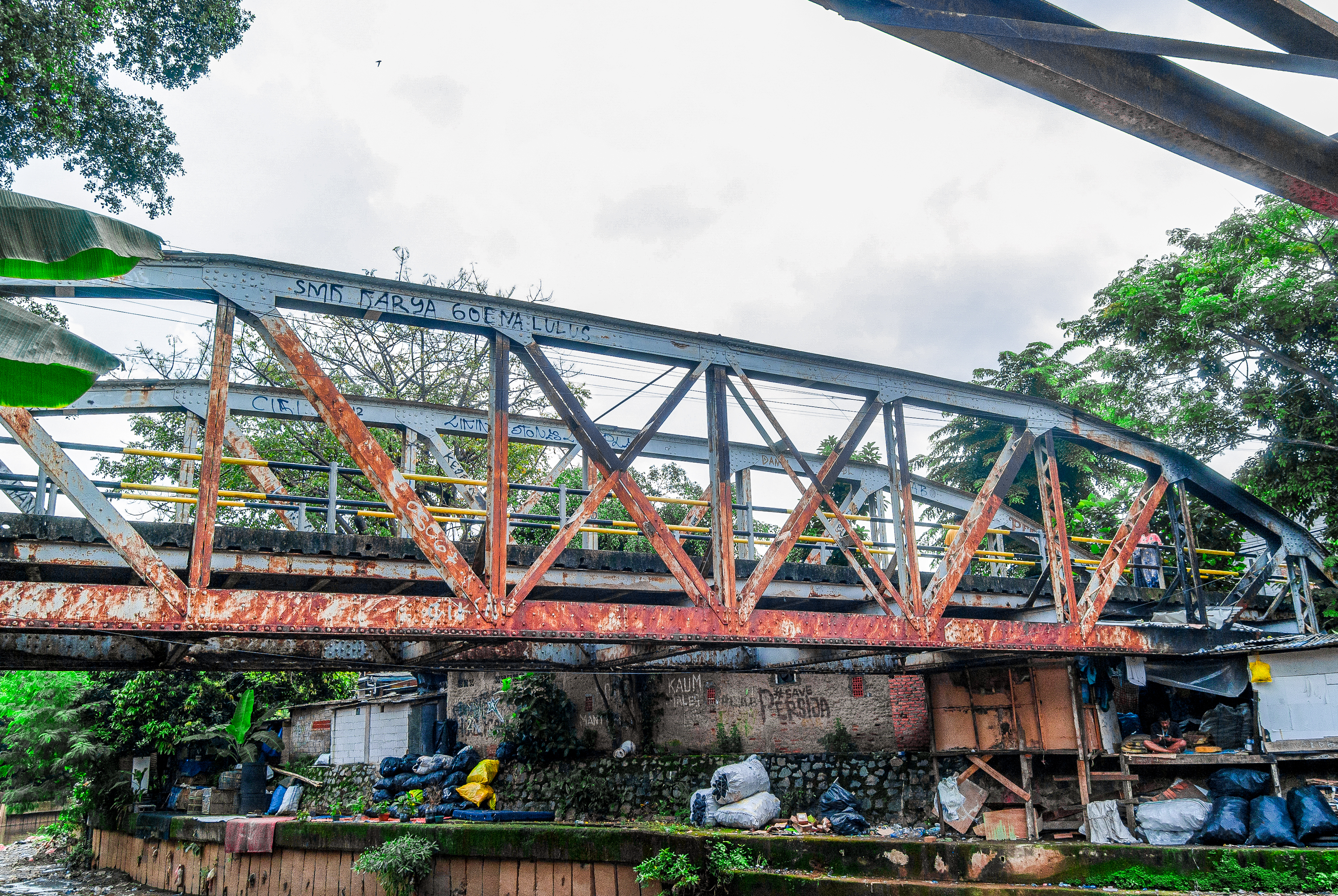
A view of the span of the Salemba line railway bridge on the Cikini-Salemba line.

The tabulation of railroad lines is based on their crossing numbers in the Buku Jarak untuk Angkutan Barang Jawa dan Madura (Distance Book for Goods Transportation in Java and Madura) published by PJKA in 1982, unless otherwise stated.

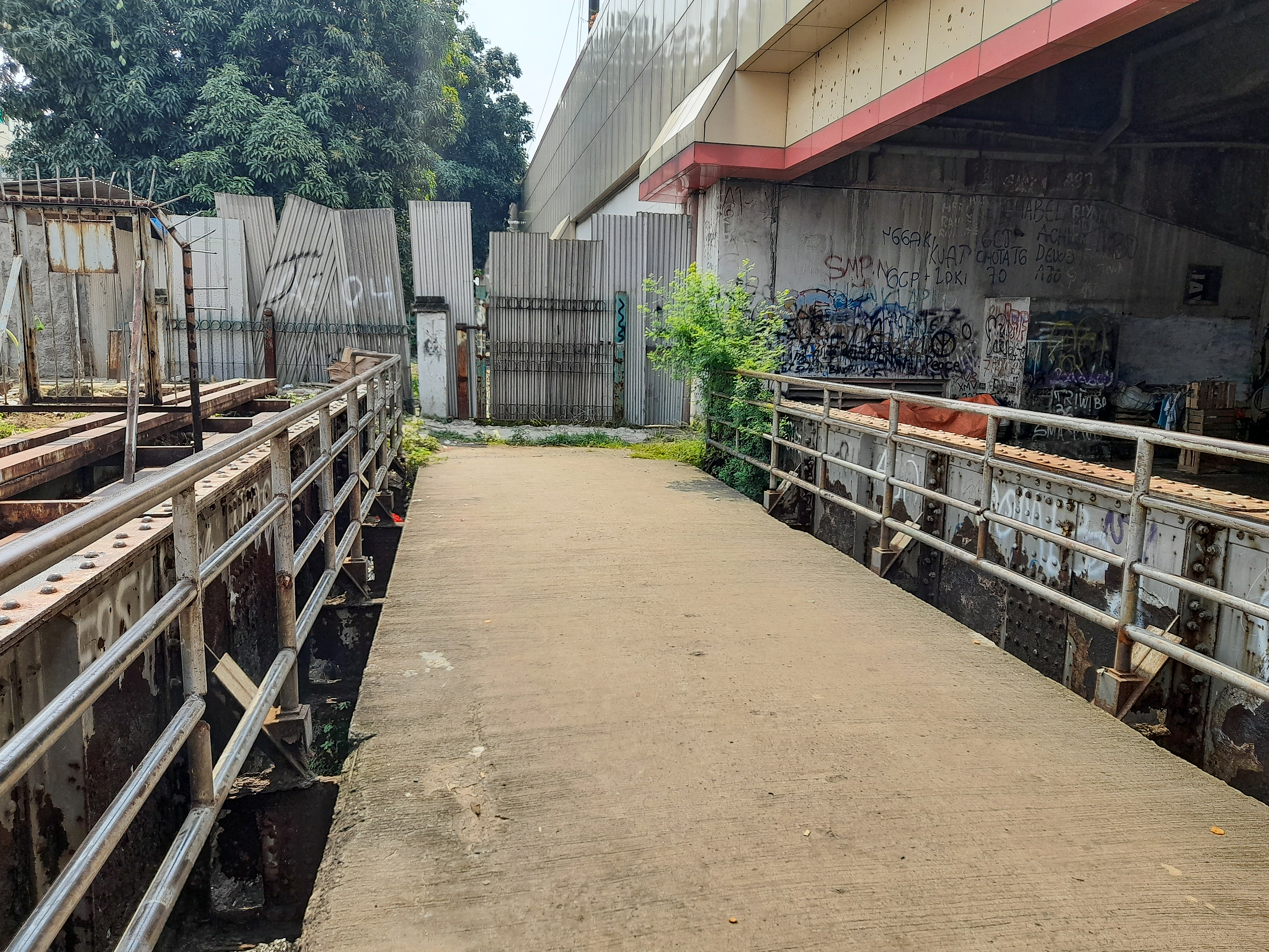
Remains of the bridge under Jayakarta Station (JAKK direction) from the Manggarai-Jakarta Kota lines while still on the ground.

==== Java ====
===== Pre-independence inactivity =====
There are railroad lines that were successfully reactivated by Djawatan Kereta Api Republik Indonesia (DKARI) in the early days of independence. This reactivated line is considered important and has high economic potential so it needs to be reactivated. In addition, there are railroad lines that are considered important for military movements. However, among the lines that DKARI successfully reactivated, many of them were deactivated for the second time in the 1970s to 1990s in the PJKA era.

Railroad line	Date inaugurated	Date closed	Inaugurating company
Tasikmalaya-Singaparna	1 June 1911	1943	Staatsspoorwegen
Rancaekek-Tanjungsari	13 February 1921	1942	Staatsspoorwegen
Dayeuhkolot-Majalaya	3 March 1922	1942	Staatsspoorwegen
Jatibarang–Karangampel	1 May 1926	1 November 1932	Staatsspoorwegen
Tulungagung–Tugu	15 July 1921 (segment Tulungagung–Campurdarat); 1 Juli 1922 (segment Campurdarat–Tugu)	1 November 1932	Staatsspoorwegen
Ponorogo–Badegan	1907–1922	1943	Staatsspoorwegen
Bedilan–Waruduwur	1897	1943	Semarang–Cheribon Stoomtram Maatschappij
Weleri-Besokor	1 April 1901		Semarang–Cheribon Stoomtram Maatschappij
Pekalongan–Wonopringgo	7 February 1916 (segment Pekalongan–Kedungwuni); 1 December 1916 (segment Kedungwuni–Wonopringgo)	1943	Semarang–Cheribon Stoomtram Maatschappij
Klangenan-Gunung Giwur	1 July 1922	1933	Semarang–Cheribon Stoomtram Maatschappij
Maos-Purwokerto Timur	16 July 1896	1943	Serajoedal Stoomtram Maatschappij
Spiritus Factory Wates-Mojokerto Kota-Gemekan- Ngoro/Dinoyo	1889–1909	1943	Oost-Java Stoomtram Maatschappij
Warungdowo-Ngempit railroad	1 December 1912	1932	Pasoeroean Stoomtram Maatschappij
Mayong-Welahan	10 November 1900	1942	Samarang–Joana Stoomtram Maatschappij
Semarang tram lines	1882–1899	1940	Samarang–Joana Stoomtram Maatschappij
Kudus–Mayong–Pecangaan (segment Bakalan–Pecangaan)	6 September 1887 (segment Kudus–Mayong); 5 May 1895 (segment Mayong–Pecangaan)	1942	Samarang–Joana Stoomtram Maatschappij
Jalur-jalur cabang KSM (except Pare–Pelem–Papar, dismantled during the Dutch Military Aggression II)	1897–1900	1943	Kediri Stoomtram Maatschappij
Kepanjen–Gondanglegi	10 Juni 1900	1943	Malang Stoomtram Maatschappij
Ngabean–Pundong	1917–1919	1943	Nederlandsch-Indische Spoorweg Maatschappij
Kelanjutan jalur kereta api Yogyakarta–Palbapang, menuju Sewugalur	21 May 1895	1943	Nederlandsch-Indische Spoorweg Maatschappij
Segmen Sumari–Gresik	1 Juni 1902	1943	Nederlandsch-Indische Spoorweg Maatschappij
Cabang-cabang Stasiun Samarang	1868–1924	1924-1942/1943	Nederlandsch-Indische Spoorweg Maatschappij

===== Post-independence inactivity =====
Lines numbers in the 1982 distance table	Railroad line	Date inaugurated	Company that inaugurated	Asset territory	Reactivation status
1 (Banten)	Labuan-Pandeglang	18 June 1906	Staatsspoorwegen	I Jakarta	No
1 (Banten)	Rangkasbitung-Pandeglang	18 June 1906	Staatsspoorwegen	I Jakarta	Yes
1 (Banten)	Cigading–Anyer Kidul	20 December 1900	Staatsspoorwegen	I Jakarta	No
2 (Lintas Jakarta)	Pegangsaan–Salemba	1904	Staatsspoorwegen	I Jakarta	No
5 (Jakarta–Cirebon)	Jatibarang–Indramayu	8 June 1912	Staatsspoorwegen	III Cirebon	No
6/12 (Semarang–Cirebon)	Kalibodri–Kendal–Kaliwungu	2 May–1 November 1897	Semarang–Cheribon Stoomtram Maatschappij	IV Semarang	No
8 (Cilacap–Yogyakarta)	Kutoarjo–Purworejo	20 July 1887	Staatsspoorwegen	V Purwokerto	Yes (Activated by the end of 2023)
SS Tram Cikampek	Cikampek–Cilamaya	1 July 1909	Staatsspoorwegen	I Jakarta	No
SS Tram Cikampek	Cikampek–Wadas	15 July 1912	Staatsspoorwegen	I Jakarta	No
SS Tram Cikampek	Karawang–Rengasdengklok	15 June 1919	Staatsspoorwegen	I Jakarta	No
SS Tram Cikampek	Lamaran–Wadas	9 February 1920	Staatsspoorwegen	I Jakarta	No
10 (SCS dan SDS)	Purwokerto–Wonosobo	1896–1917	Serajoedal Stoomtram Maatschappij	V Purwokerto	Yes
10 (SCS dan SDS)	Banjarsari-Purbalingga	1896–1917	Serajoedal Stoomtram Maatschappij	V Purwokerto	—N/a
10 (SCS dan SDS)	Cirebon–Kadipaten	29 December 1901	Semarang–Cheribon Stoomtram Maatschappij	III Cirebon	Yes
11 (Bandung Inspection cross-branch)	Cikudapateuh–Ciwidey	13 February 1921 – 17 June 1924	Staatsspoorwegen	II Bandung	Yes
11 (Bandung Inspection cross-branch)	Banjar–Cijulang	15 December 1916 – 1 June 1921	Staatsspoorwegen	II Bandung	Yes
11 (Bandung Inspection cross-branch)	Cikajang-Garut	1 August 1930	Staatsspoorwegen	II Bandung	Yes
13 (Pantura Jawa Timur)	Wirosari–Kradenan (bersama lintas 18)	1 November 1898	Samarang–Joana Stoomtram Maatschappij	IV Semarang	No
14 (Vorstenlanden)	Yogyakarta–Palbapang	21 May 1895	Nederlandsch-Indische Spoorweg Maatschappij	VI Yogyakarta	No
15 (Magelang)	Kedungjati–Secang	21 May 1873 and 1 February 1905	Nederlandsch-Indische Spoorweg Maatschappij	IV Semarang (only to Gemawang) VI Yogyakarta (Gemawang dst.)	Yes
15 (Magelang)	Parakan–Secang	1 July 1907	Nederlandsch-Indische Spoorweg Maatschappij	IV Semarang (only to Gemawang) VI Yogyakarta (Gemawang dst.)	No
15 (Magelang)	Yogyakarta–Secang	1 July 1898 and 15 May 1903	Nederlandsch-Indische Spoorweg Maatschappij	IV Semarang (only to Gemawang) VI Yogyakarta (Gemawang dst.)	Replaced with a new trajectory from DJKA
16 (Solo Raya)	Wonogiri–Baturetno	1 October 1923	Nederlandsch-Indische Spoorweg Maatschappij	VI Yogyakarta	No
16 (Solo Raya)	Purwosari–Boyolali	1892	Solosche Tramweg Maatschappij	VI Yogyakarta	No
17 (SJS Kudus)	Kudus–Mayong–Bakalan	1887-1895	Samarang–Joana Stoomtram Maatschappij	IV Semarang	No
17 (SJS Kudus)	Jurnatan–Demak– Kudus– Juwana– Rembang– Rembang–Lasem	1883–1900	Samarang–Joana Stoomtram Maatschappij	IV Semarang	Yes (Demak-Rembang)
17 (SJS Kudus)	Juwana–Tayu	1899–1900	Samarang–Joana Stoomtram Maatschappij	IV Semarang	No
18 (SJS Blora)	Demak–Purwodadi– Wirosari–Blora	1888–1894	Samarang–Joana Stoomtram Maatschappij	IV Semarang	No
18 (SJS Blora)	Rembang–Blora –Cepu	1901–1903	Samarang–Joana Stoomtram Maatschappij	IV Semarang	No
18 (SJS Blora)	Purwodadi–Gundih	28 November 1884	Poerwodadie–Goendih Stoomtram Maatschappij	IV Semarang	No
19 (around Bojonegoro)	Lasem–Bojonegoro	1914–1919	Samarang–Joana Stoomtram Maatschappij dan Nederlandsch-Indische Spoorweg Maatschappij	IV Semarang dan VIII Surabaya	Yes (Contained in the contents of the Annex to Presidential Regulation No. 80/2019)
19 (around Bojonegoro)	Merakurak–Babat	1 August 1920	Nederlandsch-Indische Spoorweg Maatschappij	VIII Surabaya	Yes (Contained in the contents of the Annex to Presidential Regulation No. 80/2019)
19 (around Bojonegoro)	Babat–Jombang	1899–1902	Babat–Djombang Stoomtram Maatschappij	VII Madiun	Yes
20 (Gresik)	Gresik–Indro		Nederlandsch-Indische Spoorweg Maatschappij	VIII Surabaya	Yes
21 (Tram OJS Surabaya)	Surabaya tram lines	1898 1923 (electric tram)	Oost-Java Stoomtram Maatschappij	VIII Surabaya	No
23 (Greater Malang)	Malang Kotalama–Gondanglegi– Dampit	1897–1899	Malang Stoomtram Maatschappij	VIII Surabaya	No
23 (Greater Malang)	Blimbing–Tumpang	1901–1903	Malang Stoomtram Maatschappij	VIII Surabaya	No
23 (Greater Malang)	Malang Kotalama–Blimbing–Singosari	1901–1903	Malang Stoomtram Maatschappij	VIII Surabaya	No
25 (Banyuwangi)	Rogojampi–Benculuk	1921–1922	Staatsspoorwegen	IX Jember	No
25 (Banyuwangi)	Kabat-Banyuwangi	2 February 1903	Staatsspoorwegen	IX Jember	No
26 (Jember Inspection cross-line)	Klakah–Lumajang–Pasirian	16 May 1896	Staatsspoorwegen	IX Jember	No
26 (Jember Inspection cross-line)	Lumajang–Balung	1927–1928	Staatsspoorwegen	IX Jember	No
26 (Jember Inspection cross-line)	Rambipuji–Balung–Puger	3 May 1913	Staatsspoorwegen	IX Jember	No
26 (Jember Inspection cross-line)	Balung–Ambulu	3 May 1913	Staatsspoorwegen	IX Jember	No
26 (Jember Inspection cross-line)	Kalisat–Panarukan	1 October 1897	Staatsspoorwegen	IX Jember	Yes (Contained in the contents of the Annex to Presidential Regulation No. 80/2019)
26 (Jember Inspection cross-line)	Situbondo-Panji	1 May 1912	Staatsspoorwegen	IX Jember	No
26 (Jember Inspection cross-line)	Probolinggo–Paiton	1897–1898	Probolinggo Stoomtram Maatschappij	IX Jember	No
26 (Jember Inspection cross-line)	Pasuruan–Warung Dowo –Winongan	1896–1898	Pasoeroean Stoomtram Maatschappij	IX Jember	No
26 (Jember Inspection cross-line)	Warung Dowo–Wonorejo	1901	Pasoeroean Stoomtram Maatschappij	IX Jember	No
27 (Mojokerto)	Mojokerto–Japanan–Porong/Bangil	1898–1899	Modjokerto Stoomtram Maatschappij	VIII Surabaya	No
27 (Mojokerto)	Bangsal–Pugeran	18 September 1899	Modjokerto Stoomtram Maatschappij	VIII Surabaya	No
28	Jombang–Kediri	7 January 1897	Kediri Stoomtram Maatschappij	VII Madiun	No
28	Pelem–Papar	8 May 1897	Kediri Stoomtram Maatschappij	VII Madiun	No
28	Madiun–Ponorogo– Slahung	1907–1922	Staatsspoorwegen	VII Madiun	Yes
33	Krian–Ploso	1912–1921	Staatsspoorwegen	VIII Surabaya	No
Rikuyu Sokyuku 1	Saketi–Bayah	1942–1944	Rikuyu Sokyoku	I Jakarta	—N/a
–	Rajapolah-Pirusa	1 December 1983	Perusahaan Jawatan Kereta Api	II Bandung	No

=== Madura ===
Lines numbers in the 1982 distance table	Railroad line	Date inaugurated	Company that inaugurated	Asset territory	Reactivation status
29	Madurese lines	1899–1913	Madoera Stoomtram Maatschappij	VIII Surabaya	Yes Contained in the contents of the Perpres Appendix No. 80 of 2019 (specifically the Kamal-Sumenep segment)

== Sumatra ==
Lines number	Railroad line	Date inaugurated	Company that inaugurated	Asset territory	Reactivation status
AT/ASS	Aceh Lines	1886–1917	Atjeh Tram/Atjeh Staatsspoorwegen	Divre I Medan	Replaced with a new trase from DJKA
DSM	Besitang–Medan (segmen Besitang-Kuala Bingai)	1887–1919	Deli Spoorweg Maatschappij	Divre I Medan	Yes
DSM	Medan–Batu/Pancur Batu dan Delitua	4 September 1887, October 1907, dan 1916	Deli Spoorweg Maatschappij	Divre I Medan	No
DSM	Lubuk Pakam–Bangun Purba	10 April 1904	Deli Spoorweg Maatschappij	Divre I Medan	No
DSM	Binjai–Kuala	1890–1902	Deli Spoorweg Maatschappij	Divre I Medan	No
DSM	Tanjungbalai-Teluk Nibung	1915	Deli Spoorweg Maatschappij	Divre I Medan	No
SSS	Padangpanjang–Payakumbuh–Limbanang	1891–1896	Staatsspoorwegen ter Sumatra's Westkust	Divre II Padang	Yes
SSS	Lubuk Alung–Sawahlunto (segmen Kayutanam–Muarakalaban)	1891–1894	Staatsspoorwegen ter Sumatra's Westkust	Divre II Padang	Yes
SSS	Muarakalaban–Muaro	1 March 1924	Staatsspoorwegen ter Sumatra's Westkust	Divre II Padang	Yes
SSS	Naras–Sungai Limau	1 January 1911	Staatsspoorwegen ter Sumatra's Westkust	Divre II Padang	Yes
SSS	Percabangan menuju Pelabuhan Teluk Bayur	1 October 1892	Staatsspoorwegen ter Sumatra's Westkust	Divre II Padang	No
ZSS	Garuntang-Telukbetung	27 May 1921	Zuid-Sumatra Staatsspoorwegen	Divre IV Tanjungkarang	No
ZSS	Tanjung Enim Baru-Tanjung Enim	1 September 1910	Zuid-Sumatra Staatsspoorwegen	Divre IV Tanjungkarang	No
	Pekanbaru–Muaro	15 August 1945	Rikuyu Sokyoku	Divre II Padang	Replaced with a new trase from DJKA

== Sulawesi ==
Lines number	Railroad line	Date inaugurated	Company that inaugurated	Asset territory	Reactivation status
STC 1	Pasarbutung–Takalar (lintas STC)	1 July 1923	Staatstramwegen op Celebes (Grup Staatsspoorwegen)	-	Replaced with a new trase from DJKA

== See also ==
- List of railway companies in the Dutch East Indies
- Jakarta Monorail
- Monorails in Central Java
- Transport in Indonesia
- List of named passenger trains of Indonesia
- List of railway stations in Indonesia
- List of railway companies in the Dutch East Indies
- Rail transport in Indonesia
- Indonesian railway signaling and sign (semboyan)
- List of railway accidents and incidents in Indonesia
- List of defunct railway in Indonesia
- List of Kereta Api Indonesia rolling stock classes
- List of locomotives in Indonesia
- Trams in Surabaya
- Trams in Jakarta
- Indonesian railway rolling stock numbering system and classification
