= List of railway companies in the Dutch East Indies =

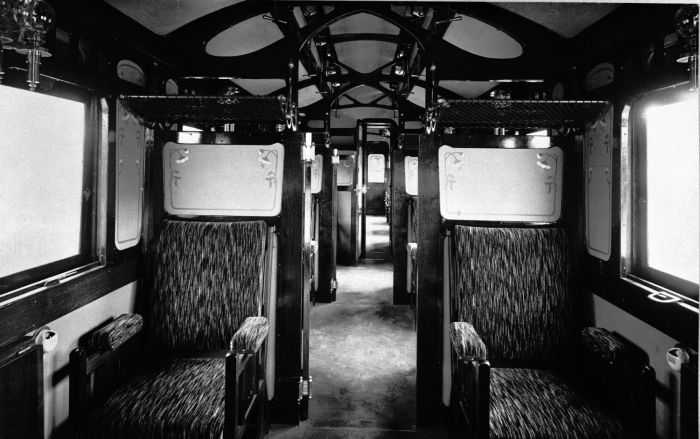
In the train class Spoorweg Deli Maatschappij (around 1920)

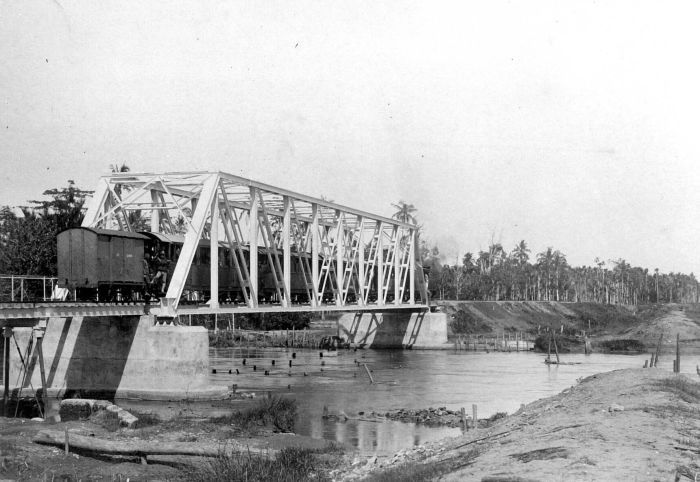
Train crosses the bridge over the river Blang Meh in Lhokseumawe during the Dutch East Indies

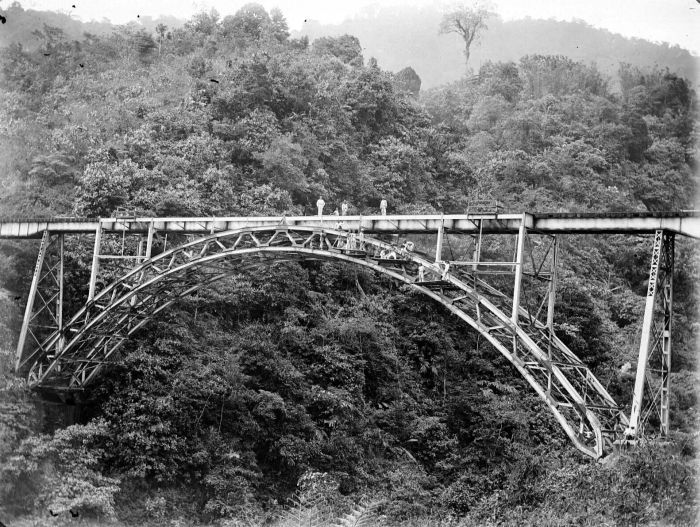
Duivelsbrug Bridge or the "Devil Bridge" over the Batang Anai near Fountain, West Sumatra (around 1915)

This is a list of railway companies in the Dutch East Indies. Some companies initially operated with a model called the narrow gauge railway and tram company.

In 1945, after the Proclamation of Independence, the Department of Railways of the Republic of Indonesia (DKA) was founded, resulting in the transfer of ownership of the railway lines. After recognition of the independence of Indonesia by the Dutch in December 1949, the company became a national company with headquarters in Bandung, which then evolved into today's Kereta Api Indonesia.

Lines were constructed only on the islands of Sumatra, Java, Madura and Sulawesi. Many of these lines are now no longer used; only the main lines are still in use.

== Sumatra ==
Public

- Atjeh Tram (AT) or Atjeh Staatsspoorwegen (ASS)
- Staatsspoorwegen ter Sumatra's Westkust (SSS)
- Staatsspoorwegen op Zuid-Sumatra (ZSS)

Private

- Deli Spoorweg Maatschappij (DSM)
- Sumatra Railway

== Java ==
Public

- Staatsspoorwegen (SS)

Private

- Babat-Djombang Stoomtram Maatschappij (BDSM)
- Bataviasche Oosterspoorweg Maatschappij (BOS)
- Java Spoorweg Maatschappij (JSM)
- Kediri Stoomtram Maatschappij (KSM)
- Madoera Stoomtram Maatschappij (MT)
- Malang Stoomtram Maatschappij (MSM)
- Modjokerto Stoomtram Maatschappij (MdjSM)
- Nederlands-Indische Spoorweg Maatschappij (NISM)
- Oost-Java Stoomtram Maatschappij (OJS)
- Pasoeroean Stoomtram Maatschappij (PsSM)
- Probolinggo Stoomtram Maatschappij (PbSM)
- Serajoedal Stoomtram Maatschappij (SDS)
- Semarang-Cheribon Stoomtram Maatschappij (SCS)
- Samarang-Joana Stoomtram Maatschappij (SJS)
- Solosche Tramweg Maatschappij (SoTM)

Private (Urban)

- Batavia Elektrische Tram Maatschappij (BET)
- Bataviasche Verkeers Maatschappij (BVM)
- Nederlands-Indische Tramweg Maatschappij (NITM)

== Sulawesi ==
- Staatstramwegen op Celebes (STC)

== See also ==
- History of rail transport in Indonesia
