= Monorails in Central Java =

Timber transport devices

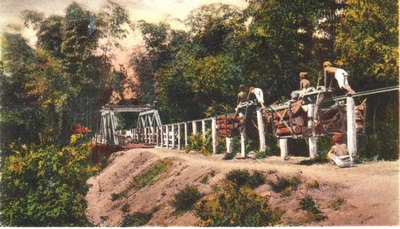
Monorail in the Grobogan area (north of Purwodadi)

Monorails were used to transport timber from the forests of Central Java, Dutch East Indies (now Indonesia) located in the mountains to the rivers.

== History ==
In 1908 and 1909, the forester H. J. L. Beck built a manually operated monorail of limited but sufficient capacity for the transport of small timber and firewood in the northern Surabaya forest district. In later years, this idea was further developed by L. A. van de Ven, who was a forester in the Grobogan forest district (north of Poerwodadi 7.03089°S 110.92061°E) around 1908–1910. He devoted himself to the planning, construction and operation of monorails, especially monorails with larger capacity for heavier transport. His consideration was that the construction and maintenance of monorails in hilly terrain, apart from saving one rail, would be considerably cheaper than the usual two-rail tracks, such as those of the Cepu Forest Railway. As a result, monorails were built by plantation operators and wood processing companies throughout the mountains of Central Java. There were monorail lines in Grobogan, Undakan (in Kudus Regency), Monggot (in Grobogan Regency), and Cepu (in Blora Regency) forest administrations, as well as in Djombang-Babat forest administrations in East Java. In 1919/1920, however, the hand-operated monorails gradually disappeared and were replaced by narrow-gauge railways with steam locomotives as forest utilization changed.

== Operation ==
The metal rail of the monorail at Babat (Lage) was laid at a height of about 3 metres on sawn-off tree stumps or on buried posts. On the rail, W-shaped carriages with an extremely low centre of gravity were moved by gravity or by hand. Even in the sharpest curves the swinging carriages could not get out of balance. Even in the rainy season, when the forest roads turned into swamps, the timber transport went undisturbed at lofty heights on the sawn-off trees.

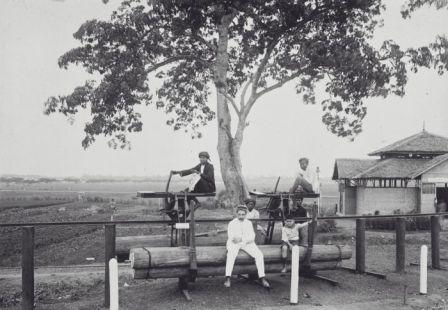
Typical monorail rolling stock

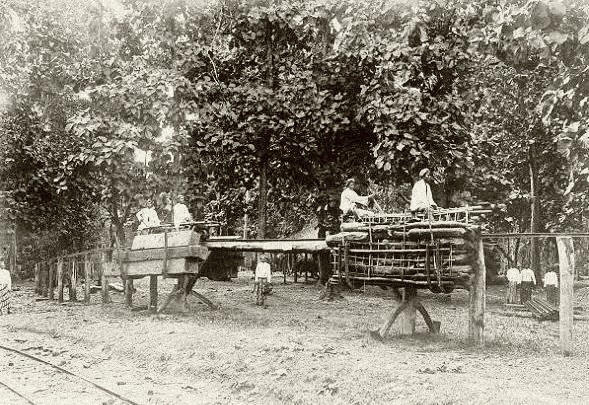
Monorail at Grobogan

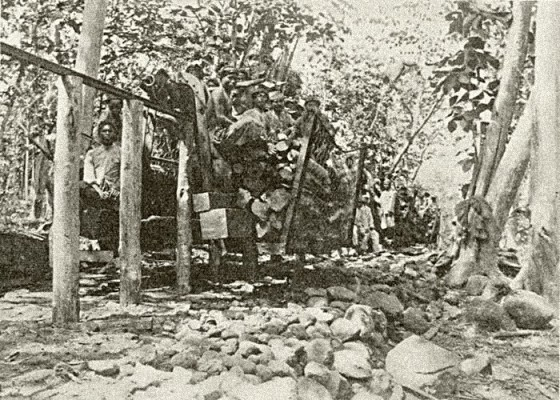
Monorail for 6 cubic metres (210 cu ft) or approx 5 tonnes timber

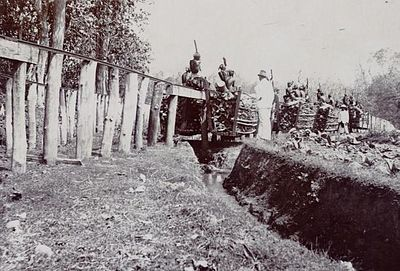
Monorail near Tjepoe (Cepu)
