= Serajoedal Stoomtram Maatschappij =

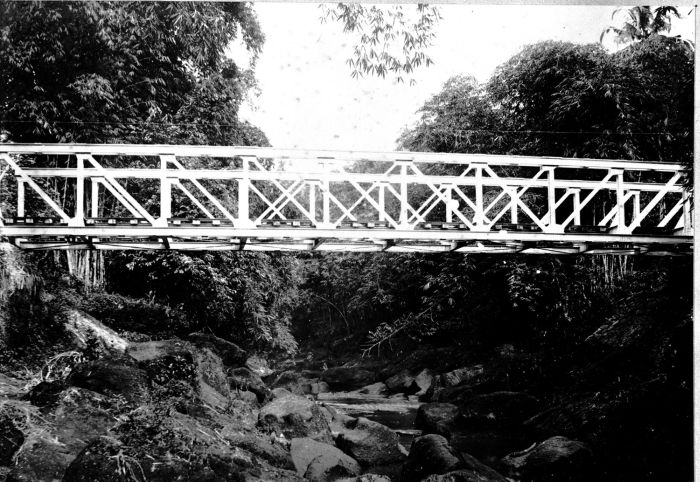
- Bridge over Peloes River near Soekaradja Station Map of track, July 1918

Technical
- Line length: 142 kilometres (88 mi)
- Track gauge: 1,067 mm (3 ft 6 in)
- Map of stations

The Serajoedal Stoomtram Maatschappij (SDS or SDSM, Dutch for Serayu Valley Steam Tram Company, Indonesian also Perusahaan Trem Uap Lembah Serayu) was a railway company, whose route followed the Serayu Valley and connected Maos via Patikraja, Purwokerto, Sokaraja, Purbalingga, Klampok, Mandiraja and Banjarnegara with Wonosobo on 142 kilometers of rail network. This company are the pioneer of railway development in Banyumas Regent, even before Staatsspoorwegen exist in earlier 1900's.

== History ==
The company was founded in 1894 after R.H. Eysonius de Waal and O.J.A. Repelaer van Driel had received concessions for the construction and operation of a steam railway in 1893 and 1894.

The construction of the route was carried out sequentially in three phases. The construction of the track cost 1,500,000 guilders, financed by the Financiele Maaatscappij van Nijverheidsondernemingen in Ned. Indies. The project was led by the engineer C. Groll. The railway line was built on the basis of Dutch economic interests by providing fast and cheap means of transport to Dutch government companies, especially sugar factories.

The route was shut down from 1978 to 1980 section by section. The assets, which had been formerly owned by the SDS and later the PT Kereta Api Indonesia belonged to the Department of Transportation of the Republic of Indonesia from the 1980s to regional autonomy in 2001 and to the Transportation Department of the province of Central Java from 2001 to 2006 .

== Locomotives ==
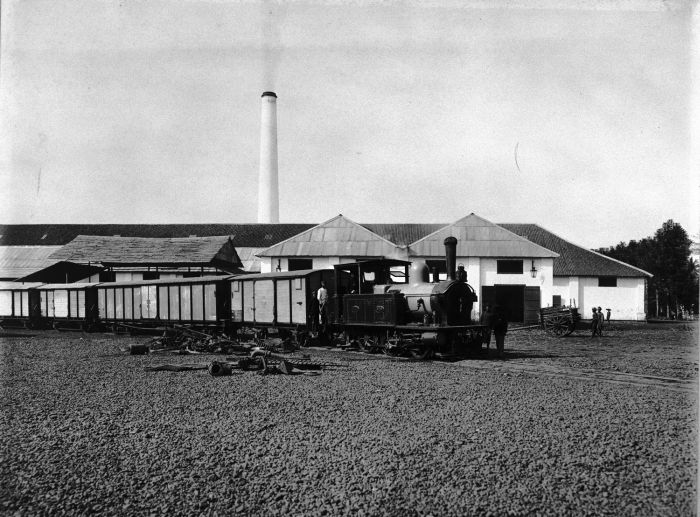
Steam train in front of the Kalibagor sugar refinery

- Beyer, Peacock & Company: 14 steam locomotives, C1401-C1414
- Hartmann: 5 Locomotives, D1007-D1011
- Hohenzollern Locomotive Works: 3 locomotives, D1301-D1303

== Usage ==
The following companies used the railway :

- Tobacco plantations in Patikraja, Purbalingga, Banjarnegara and Wonosobo.
- Sugar factory in Purwokerto, Kalibagor, Kalimanah, Bojong, and Klampok.
- Cinnamon plantations in Wonosobo and Banjarnegara.
- Tea plantations in Wonosobo and Banjarnegara.

== Phases of track construction ==
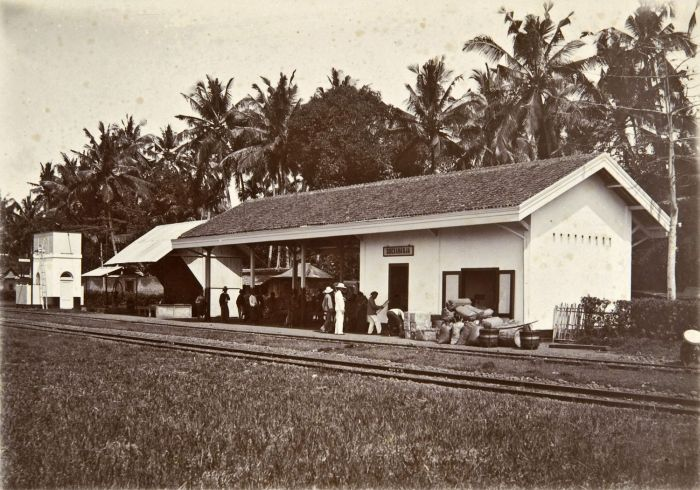
Station Soekaradja

=== First Phase ===
- Maos – Purwokerto Timur, 29 km (18 miles), inaugurated on 16 July 1896 (Maos – Rawalo – Panisinan – Tinggartugu – Glempong – Tinggarjengkol – Gringging – Sampang – Kebasen – Patikraja – Sidabowa – Tanjung – Purwokerto Timur)
- Purwokerto Timur – Sokaraja, 9 km (5.6 miles), inaugurated on 5 December 1896 (Purwokerto Timur – Pasar Wage – Sangkalputung – Sokaraja – Zuckerfabrik Kalibagor)
- Sokaraja – Purworeja Klampok, 16 km (9.9 miles), inaugurated on 2 July 1897 eingeweiht (Sokaraja – Banjarsari – Muntang – Karangkemiri – Kemangkon – Purworeja Klampok)
- Purworeja Klampok – Banjarnegara, 30 km (19 miles), inaugurated on 18 May 1898 eingeweiht (Purworeja Klampok – Gandulekor – Mandiraja – Purwonegoro – Gumiwang – Binorong – Mantrianom – Pucang – Wangon – Banjarnegara)
- Purworeja Klampok – Kandis, 7 km (4.3 miles), inaugurated on 16 July 1898 eingeweiht (Purworeja Klampok – Tangan Kidul – Tangan Lor – Kayutanam – Bronggong – Kandis)

=== Second Phase ===
- Banjarsari – Purbalingga, 7 km (4.3 miles), inaugurated on 1 July 1900 (Banjarsari – Jompo – Kalimanah – Purbalingga)

=== Third Phase ===
- Banjarnegara – Selokromo, 29 km (18 miles), inaugurated on 1 May 1916 (Banjarnegara – Soalanandi – Singomerto – Sigalu – Prigi – Bandingan – Bojonegoro – Tunggoro – Selokromo)
- Selokromo – Wonosobo, 14 km (8.7 miles), inaugurated on 7 June 1917 eingeweiht (Selokromo – Krasak – Selomerto – Penawangan – Wonosobo)
