= Madoera Stoomtram Maatschappij =

Railway company in the Dutch East Indies

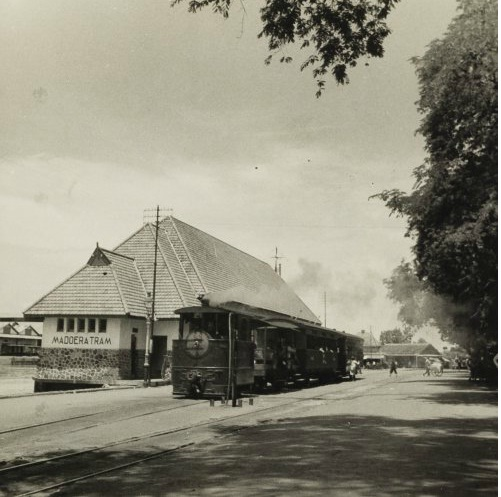
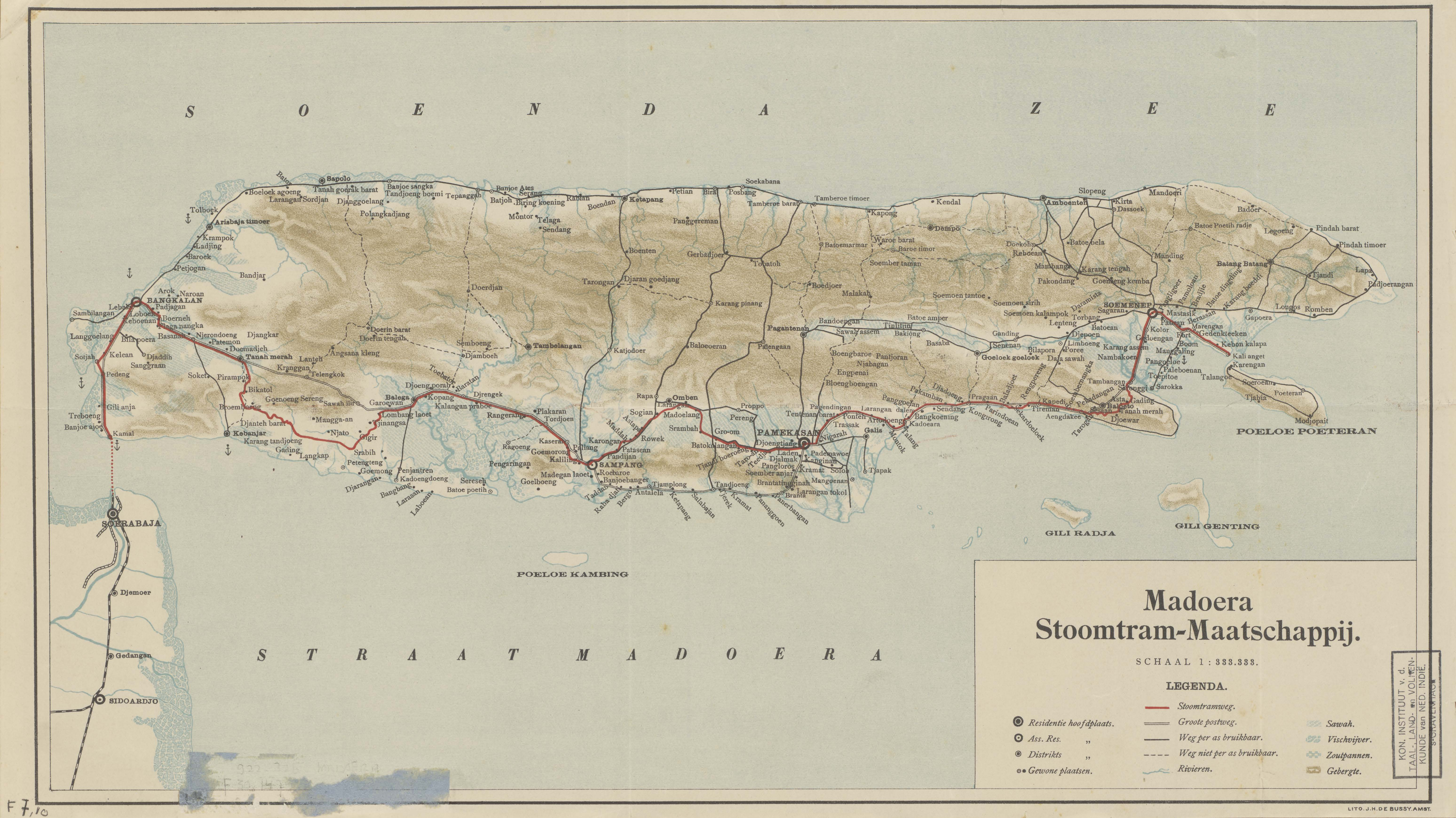
- Madoera Tram, 1930. Map around 1915

Overview
- Main region: Madura
- Dates of operation: 1901–1950
- Successor: Kereta Api Indonesia

Technical
- Track gauge: 1,067 mm (3 ft 6 in)
- Length: 142 kilometres (88 mi)

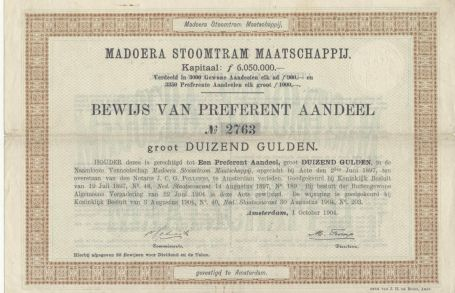
Stock certificate, 1. October 1904

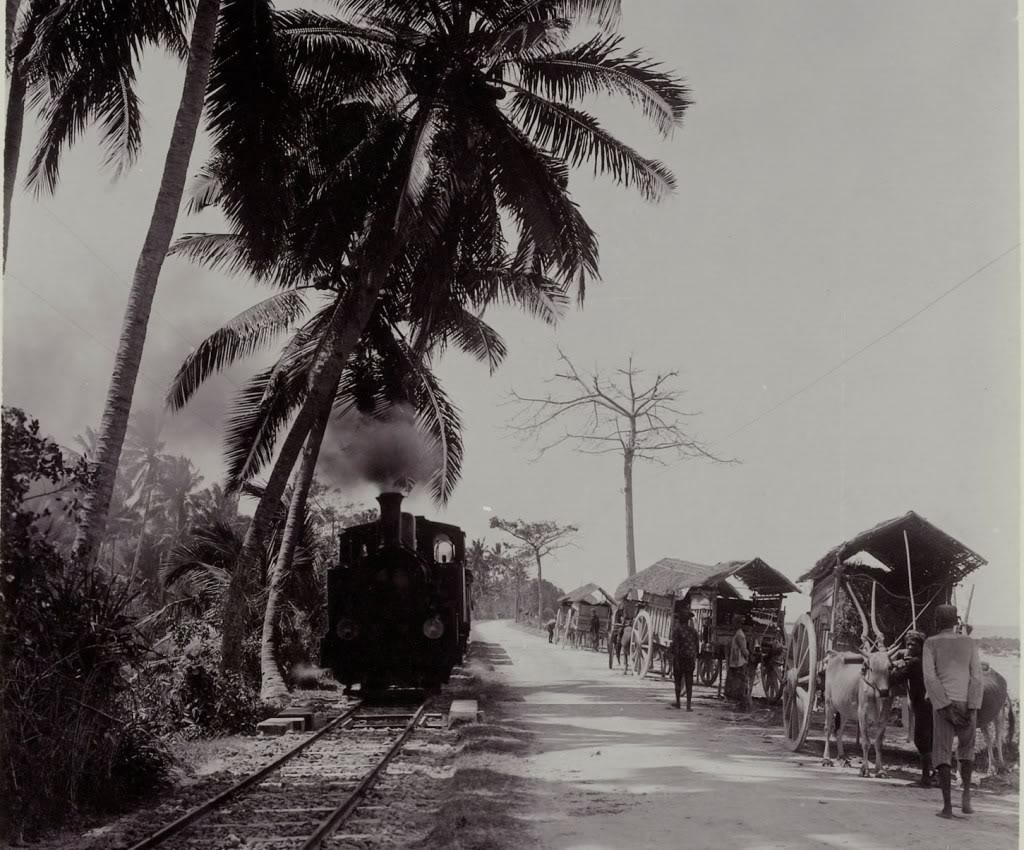
The tram ran mostly alongside existing road

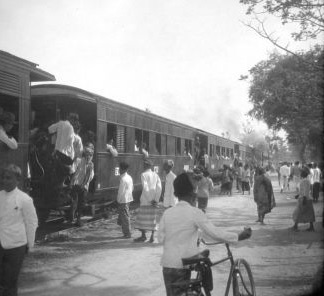
Train at a station

The Madoera Stoomtram Maatschappij (MdrSM, Dutch for Madurian Steam Tram Company) on Madura Island today's Indonesian province of Jawa Timur (East Java) was one of the railway companies in the Dutch East Indies. The company had its headquarters in The Hague and was licensed in 1896. In 1901 it put the first steam trams in operation to connect the western with the eastern end of the island.

The tramway is now defunct. All of MdrSM assets are currently owned by Madurian Asset Management of the Indonesian Railways Co. (Kereta Api Indonesia), 8th Operational Region of Surabaya.

== History ==
=== Founding and start-up ===
From 1884, while the Dutch were establishing direct control over Madura (Madoera Residency), serious plans were made for the construction of trams. A number of concession applications for a tram were not granted by the government, because the applicants could not meet the concession conditions. On 26 September 1896, the former administrator of the Netherlands-Indian Spoorweg Maatschappij, EM Collard, published a petition in which he requested a concession for the construction and operation of a steam tram on Madura, from Kamal via Bangkalan, Sampang, Pamekasan and Soemenep to the port of Kalianget. The concession was granted by Government Resolution No. 10 of 18 November 1896. Permission for the establishment of the Madoera Stoomtram Maatschappij was then given by Royal Decree No. 48.1 of 19 July 1897.

The deposit of the guarantee capital in the Netherlands secured the construction of the route. In 1897 Madoera Stoomtram Maatschappij was founded to carry out the construction and operation of a steam train at the Madoera Residence from Kamal via Bangkalan, Sampang, Pamekasan and Soemenep to Kaliang and to construct other trams on Madura or elsewhere in the Dutch East Indies, or to operate, to exploit, to establish, to take over and to operate ships and other means of transport and equipment, or to participate in companies for that purpose."

The line was built and put into operation from 1898 to 1901 as follows: Kamal-Bangkalan (1898), Bangkalan-Tunjung (1899), Tunjung-Kwanyar (1900), Tanjung-Kapedi (1900), Kapedi-Tambangan (1900), Tambangan-Kalianget (1899), Kwanyar-Blega (1901), Tanjung-Sampang (1901) and Sampang-Blega (1901).

The company received a director from Amsterdam who was responsible for day-to-day management. He was appointed by the Annual General Meeting and supervised by members of the Board of Directors. On Madura, a steward who was responsible for the management and actual use of the railway was used. He officially had the title of Main Representative (Dutch: Hoofdvertegenwoordiger) but was called in practice for a long time Administrator. He maintained regular correspondence with the director and was also supervised by the Local Committee, which had a seat in Surabaya.

=== Freight transport ===
The transport of goods has always played an important role: when the tram company was founded, salt transport was considered to play an important role as a source of income. The production and sale of salt was a monopoly of the government in Indonesia. In the first annual report of Madoera Stoomtram Maatschappij, its director, M. Tromp, mentioned that salt transport could be expected to take place on this route, as the government had just begun pressing the salt into briquettes at the time of foundation. Therefore, it was expected that the entire supply of raw salt, briquettes and fuels could be handled by rail. The Governor-General was asked to set up the salt stores as close as possible to the steam tram stops. Upon completion of the route, the company hoped to take over the transport of salt supplies, which were transported from Sampang and Soemenep to the eastern residences of Java. However, the first public tender for salt transport showed that the tram could not compete with land transport. Although the tram later transported some salt, passenger, livestock and freight continued to be the main income of the company.

=== Integration into the VNISTM ===
The efficiency of the trams, which were relatively expensive in construction, fell short of expectations, which led to various financial restructuring. In order to get the local traffic better under control, smaller ship connections to the mainland of Java were operated and on the island itself were maintained from 1928 extensive bus connections.

In 1911, the support fund for the employees of the NV Madoero Stoomtram Maatschappij was set up to regulate the social provisions for European and Indian personnel in the Dutch East Indies. In 1914, as part of a foundation, a savings and insurance fund for European and equivalent employees of NV Madoera Stoomtram Maatschappij was set up. It was intended to regulate pension provisions for European staff in the form of a capital or a pension.

J. Th. Gerlings, the director of the Java-based "Vier Zuster-Maatschappijen", sent a letter to the directors of the other tram companies in 1917 proposing to set up a joint interest group. This initiative led to the founding of the Vereeniging van Nederlandsch-Indian Spoorentramwegmaatschappijen (VNISTM) on 16 June 1917.

=== World War II ===
As of 10 May 1940, the management and supervisory board of Madoera Stoomtram Maatschappij, based in the Netherlands, was no longer entitled to function outside the jurisdiction of occupied territory according to the London-based Law Enforcement Committee in Wartime (Commissie voor Rechtsverkeer in Oorlogstijd, CORVO).

During the Japanese occupation and the subsequent Indonesian independence struggle, the tram suffered considerable damage. Most of the staff was interned by the Japanese during 1942, so by the end of 1942 nearly all European employees and their families were held in Japanese prisons or detention camps. The so-called Madoera Affair was the arrest in August 1942 and the execution in February 1944 of 62 executives of the Madurese salt extraction plants and the Madoera Stoomtram Maatschappij by the Japanese during the Japanese occupation of the Dutch East Indies. In August 1942, a reported as "lost" freight car Madoera Stoomtram Maatschappij, which was loaded with ammunition intended for the Royal Dutch Indian Army, was found by a Japanese patrol. This car was found in the yard of Ngawi, Ngawi. Due to a leak, the Japanese military police Kempeitai obtained a list of names of the demolition command, which had seriously damaged important facilities on the island shortly before the occupation of the island. The Kempeitai also learned of a plan of the chemists from the salt extraction plants to make explosives by chemically processing salt. Therefore, the Japanese suspected that there were radio links with allies. Under suspicion of illegal anti-Japanese activities, the entire management of these companies was arrested and later executed. The arrested administrative staff remained interned.

The board was subordinated to the main representative in Dutch India. After the capitulation in 1942, the trams was immediately taken over by the Japanese army leadership. Soon after, the management also taken over by the Japanese, who brought the state railways, the private railways and trams and the road traffic under a central Japanese management in Bandoeng.

=== Post-war period ===
Following the return of the Dutch-Indonesian Government under Lieutenant-General Van Mook, the then Director of Transport, Public Works and Water Management informed the company representatives that the repair and reuse of the railway system should be centrally located and regulated. The private railway and tram companies would therefore be temporarily taken over by the government. To this end, the Co-operative Enterprise Regulation ("Verordening Medewerking Bedrijven") was adopted by Van Mook.

The intention was that private companies join forces with the state railways to form a United Railway Company. This would be managed and managed by a government-designated agency for this purpose. The private companies would receive annual compensation for the use of their businesses by the state.

These issues, which were so important to all companies, were discussed in the VNISTM. They were aware that the railway network had been operated as a unit under Japanese occupation, and it would therefore be difficult to divide it up again. It would have been unlikely that companies could have regained their former capacity to act. After lengthy negotiations with the government, the relationship between the state and the societies was provisionally regulated by the decree of the Governor-General of 14 February 1948, No. 12, which also set the charges for their use. It was confirmed, among other things, that the contract became retroactively valid with effect from 1 January 1946.

=== Nationalisation ===
Due to the transfer of sovereignty in December 1949, all rights and obligations were transferred to the Republic of Indonesia. The annual charges to private rail and tram companies were continued by Djawatan Kereta Api, the Indonesian State Railways. Soon after, the Indonesian Minister of Communications of the VNISTM indicated that the railways would remain state-owned, with the intention of taking them over. However, the financial situation of the state was an obstacle to the early implementation of this intention, so that the previous situation was maintained. As a result, the joint departments in February 1950 informed the Minister that they were ready to cooperate in a takeover by accepting a payment agreement. They pointed out, however, that the annual compensation had been agreed only until 1949 and that it had to be fixed for the coming years.

On 23 June 1950, the VNISTM appointed a committee to report to the Minister, in close cooperation with the companies, on the costs of repurchase and payment. After the Directors had agreed to cooperate, this committee was established under the chairmanship of the Railway Service with Ministerial Decree of 19 August 1950. This committee advised the minister in mid-1952. This opinion was discussed in the Financial and Financial Council in March 1953, which agreed with the opinion, and authorized the Minister for Communications to negotiate with VNISTM.

In March 1953, the Minister set up a new committee to conduct the negotiations. For this purpose, the company authorized the engineers AS Carpentier Alting and BW Colenbrander. However, attempts to reach a fruitful consultation failed, largely due to the many Indonesian changes of cabinet that led to them having to deal with a new Secretary of Communications on a regular basis.

The New Guinea issue and the anti-Dutch measures taken by Sukarno, including the nationalization of Dutch companies, have finally put an end to the negotiations. This ended the representation of Dutch companies in Indonesia. When diplomatic relations between the Netherlands and Indonesia returned to normal in 1966, negotiations for compensation continued. The Netherlands then examined the applications, made the allocations and regulated the distribution of the installments. When it finally became known in 1970 which amount had to be paid, it was decided to liquidate the companies united in the VNISTM. The last railway line on Madura was officially shut down in 1987.

== Vehicles ==
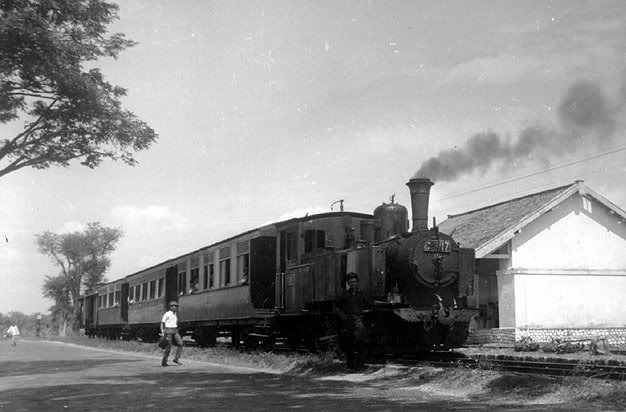
Steam locomotive C3117 in the 1960s

In 1930, the rail vehicles consisted of 33 locomotives, 367 cars and freight cars and 23 buses.

From Hartmann there were 20 three-axle 0-6-0 steam locomotives with the serial numbers 2435–2446 from the year of construction 1898 and with the serial numbers 2476–2483 from the year of construction 1899, in the Madoera Stoomtram Maatschappij the numbers C3101-C3120 carried. Two biaxial 0-4-0 Hohenzollern steam locomotives with the serial numbers 1056 and 1057 from the year 1897 ran under the numbers 26 and 27.

There were also four steamships, six motor ships, 17 barges and an excavator. The ships were Caroline (I., 1901), Caroline (II., 1902), Resident Bodemeijer (1902), and Elisabeth Caroline (1936).

== Infrastructure ==
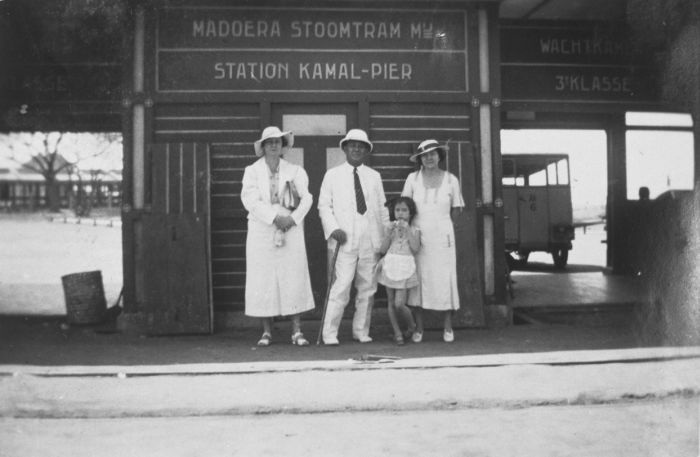
Kamal station Pier

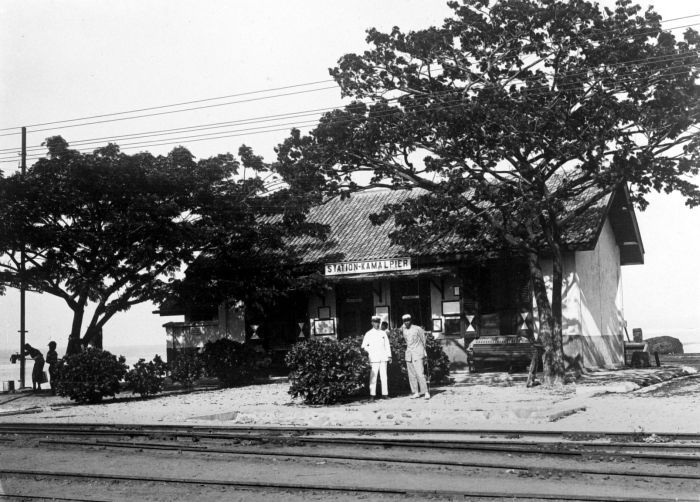
Station Kamal Pier

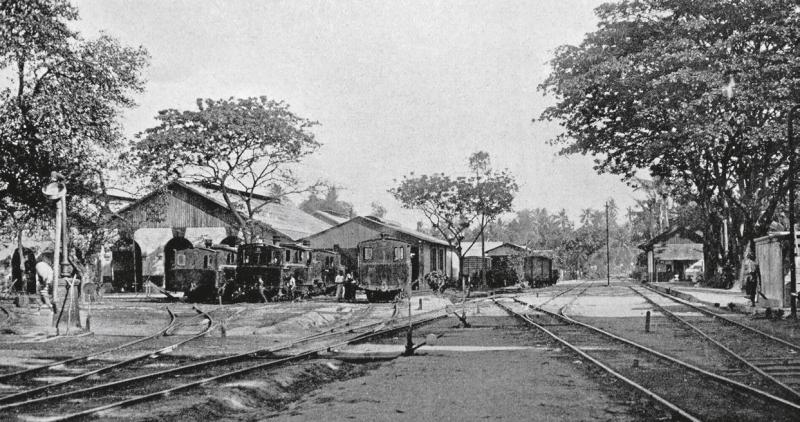
Tram depot in Kamal around 1929

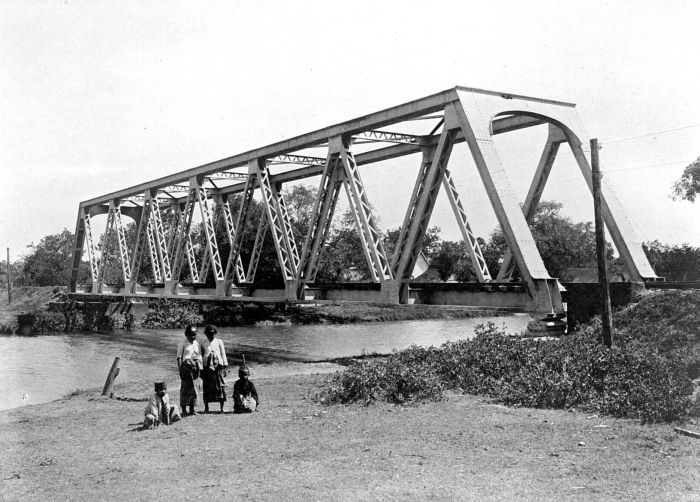
Bridge in Sungai Sampang

== Rail network ==
Overall, the length of the tram network on Madura was initially 142 kilometres (88 mi) and in 1939 even 213 kilometres (132 mi). The following tram lines were built and operated by the Madoera Stoomtram Maatschappij:

| No. | First station | Terminus | Line | Remarks |
|---|---|---|---|---|
| 1. | Kwanyar | Kalianget | Linie Kwanyar-Kalianget | The section Pamekasan-Kalianget was destroyed during World War II by the Japanese, the section Kwanyar-Pamekasan should be put back into operation |
| 2. | Kamal-Pier-Pier | Kwanyar | Linie Kamal-Kwanyar | via Bangkalan, the section Kamal-Bangkalan should be put back into operation |
| 3. | Kamal-Pier | Kwanyar | Linie Kamal-Kwanyar | via Sukolilo, should be put back into operation |
