= List of locomotives in Indonesia =

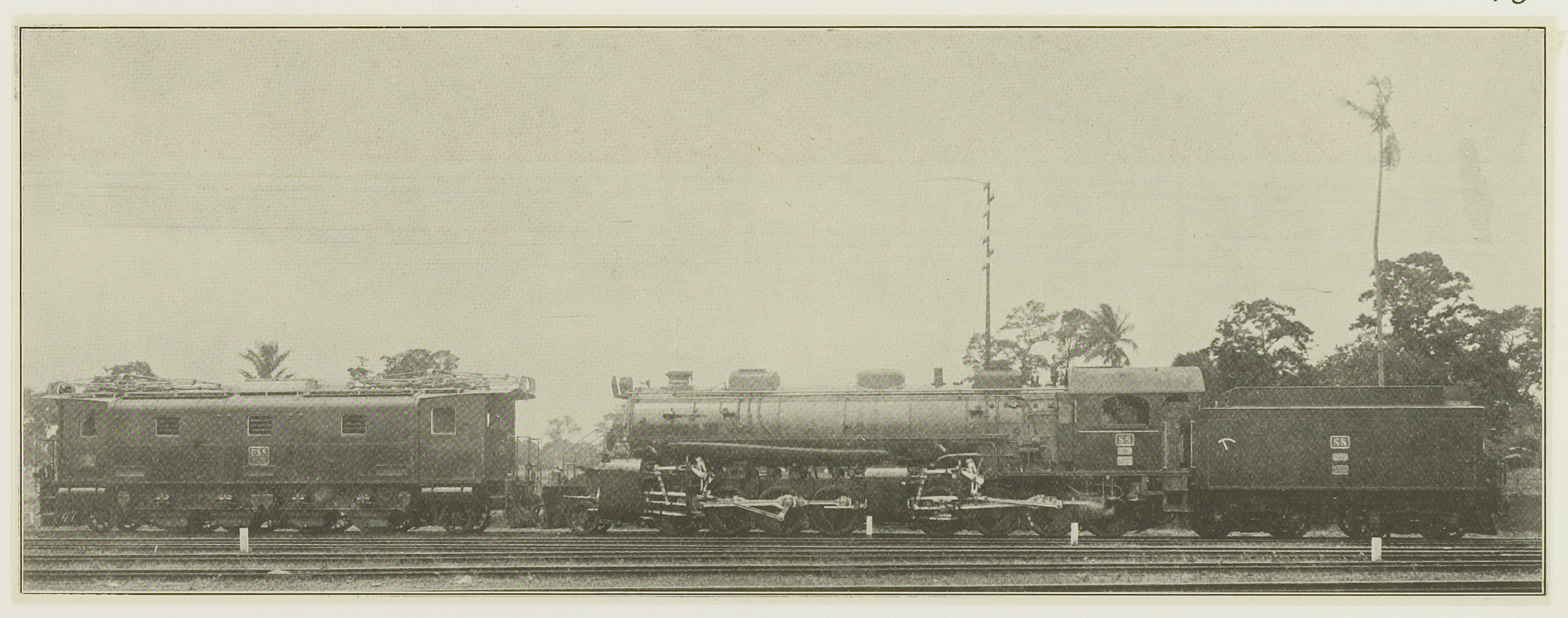
Steam locomotive (Series No. 1250) and an electric locomotive (Series No. 3002) on the Staatsspoorwegen

This is a list of locomotives in Indonesia and the former Netherlands East Indies.

== Steam locomotives ==
All steam locomotives in Indonesia were operated during the Dutch colonial era to the PJKA era, during the 1980s era. In Greater Jakarta, steam locomotives were operated between the 1930s and 1980-1990s (e.g.: steam trams were actually closed in the early 1980s electricity was actually closed at the end of the decade 1990s due to being displaced by electric locomotives, diesel locomotives, city transportation and the emergence of ojek motorcycle ). The first locomotives in Indonesia were NIS 1 and 2 belonging to Nederlandsch-Indische Spoorweg Maatschappij, to serve the Samarang NIS-Tanggung railway line. The following list of steam locomotives in Indonesia does not include all steam locomotives operated by all train operators in the Dutch East Indies. The following is a list of steam locomotives in Indonesia.

=== Railway companies ===
==== Track gauge 1,435 mm (4 ft 8 1/2 in) ====
- Locomotive NIS 107, was built by Hanomag (1907)

==== Track gauge 1,067 mm (3 ft 6 in) ====
Sourced from, except where noted

===== B series (Two Coupled) =====
Class	Unit number	Original number	Image	Axles (Whyte)	Builder(s)	Year built	Initial use	Surviving unit(s)
B10	01-02	NIS 1 & 3, later 331-332		2-4-0T	(United Kingdom) Beyer, Peacock & Company	1871	mainline	none
B11	01	NIS 12, later 336		2-4-0T	(United Kingdom) Beyer, Peacock & Company	1884	mainline	none
B11	02-04	NIS 15-17, later 337-339		2-4-0T	(United Kingdom) Beyer, Peacock & Company	1898-1899	mainline	none
B12	01-04	OJS 13-16		0-4-0Tr	(United Kingdom) Beyer, Peacock & Company	1891	tram line	B12 39
B12	05-06	OJS 17-18		0-4-0Tr	(United Kingdom) Beyer, Peacock & Company	1899 & 1895	tram line	B12 39
B12	07-11	OJS 19-23		0-4-0Tr	(United Kingdom) Beyer, Peacock & Company	1898	tram line	B12 39
B12	12-13	OJS 24-25		0-4-0Tr	(United Kingdom) Beyer, Peacock & Company	1900 & 1899	tram line	B12 39
B12	14-15	OJS 26-27		0-4-0Tr	(United Kingdom) Beyer, Peacock & Company	1910	tram line	B12 39
B12	16-17	OJS 29-30		0-4-0Tr	(United Kingdom) Beyer, Peacock & Company	1885 & 1901	tram line	B12 39
B12	18-19	OJS 31-32		0-4-0Tr	(United Kingdom) Beyer, Peacock & Company	1888	tram line	B12 39
B12	20-21	OJS 33-34		0-4-0Tr	(United Kingdom) Beyer, Peacock & Company	1884	tram line	B12 39
B12	22-23	OJS 36-37		0-4-0Tr	(United Kingdom) Beyer, Peacock & Company	1888-1889	tram line	B12 39
B12	24	OJS 39		0-4-0Tr	(United Kingdom) Beyer, Peacock & Company	1898	tram line	B12 39
B12	25-27	SJS 40-42		0-4-0Tr	(United Kingdom) Beyer, Peacock & Company	1901	tram line	B12 39
B12	28-37	SJS 43-52		0-4-0Tr	(Netherlands) Werkspoor	1902	tram line	B12 39
B12	38-40	SJS 53-55		0-4-0Tr	(Netherlands) Werkspoor	1903	tram line	B12 39
B12	41-42	SJS 56-57		0-4-0Tr	(United Kingdom) Beyer, Peacock and Company	1905	tram line	B12 39
B12	43	SJS 58		0-4-0Tr	(United Kingdom) Beyer, Peacock and Company	1900	tram line	B12 39
B12	44-46	OJS 38-40, later SJS 59-61		0-4-0Tr	(Dutch East Indies) OJS Groedo Workshop	1922-1923	tram line	B12 39
B13	01-11	SS 74-84		2-4-0T	(German Empire) Hanomag	1886	mainline	B13 04
B14	01-02	NIS 13-14, later 340-341		2-4-2T	(United Kingdom) Beyer, Peacock & Company	1893-1894	mainline	none
B15	01-08	KSM 1-8		0-4-0Tr	(German Empire) Hohenzollern Locomotive Works	1896	tram line	none
B15	09-10	KSM 9-10		0-4-0Tr	(German Empire) Hohenzollern Locomotive Works	1897	tram line	none
B15	11	KSM 11		0-4-0Tr	(German Empire) Hohenzollern Locomotive Works	1898	tram line	none
B16	01-02	PbSM 1-2		0-4-0Tr	(German Empire) Hohenzollern Locomotive Works	1897	tram line	B16 02
B16	03-05	PbSM 4-6		0-4-0Tr	(German Empire) Hohenzollern Locomotive Works	1896-1897	tram line	B16 02
B16	06	PsSM 7, later PbSM 7		0-4-0Tr	(German Empire) Hohenzollern Locomotive Works	1897	tram line	B16 02
B16	07	PsSM 10		0-4-0Tr	(German Empire) Hohenzollern Locomotive Works	1897	tram line	B16 02
B16	08-12	PsSM 14-18		0-4-0Tr	(German Empire) Hohenzollern Locomotive Works	1900	tram line	B16 02
B16	24	PsSM 12		0-4-0Tr	(German Empire) Hohenzollern Locomotive Works	1899	tram line	B16 02
B17	01-05	MS 1-5		0-4-0Tr	(German Empire) Hohenzollern Locomotive Works	1897-1898	tram line	B17 06
B17	06-07	MS 6-7		0-4-0Tr	(German Empire) Hohenzollern Locomotive Works	1899	tram line	B17 06
B17	08-09	MS 8-9		0-4-0Tr	(German Empire) Hohenzollern Locomotive Works	1900	tram line	B17 06
B17	10	MS 13		0-4-0Tr	(German Empire) Hohenzollern Locomotive Works	1900	tram line	B17 06
B17	11	KSM 17		0-4-0Tr	(German Empire) Hohenzollern Locomotive Works	1905	tram line	B17 06
B18	01-04	MSM 2-4, 6		0-4-0Tr	(Netherlands) Backer & Rueb	1898	tram line	none
B19	01-04	KSM 12-15		0-4-0Tr	(German Empire) Hohenzollern Locomotive Works	1898	tram line	none
B20	01-02	SCS 29-30		0-4-0Tr	(United Kingdom) Beyer, Peacock & Company	1900	tram line	B20 14
B20	03-08	SCS 31-36		0-4-0Tr	(United Kingdom) Beyer, Peacock & Company	1901	tram line	B20 14
B20	09-12	SCS 37-40		0-4-0Tr	(Netherlands) Werkspoor	1902	tram line	B20 14
B20	13	SCS 41		0-4-0Tr	(Netherlands) Werkspoor	1903	tram line	B20 14
B20	14-16	SCS 42-44		0-4-0Tr	(United Kingdom) Beyer, Peacock and Company	1905	tram line	B20 14
B20	17-19	SCS 45-47		0-4-0Tr	(United Kingdom) Beyer, Peacock and Company	1907	tram line	B20 14
B21	01-06	MSM 1 & 5, 7-10		0-4-0T	(German Empire) Krauss Locomotive Works	1899	tram line, branch line	none
B21	07-08	BDSM 6 & 8, later SS 110 & 112		0-4-0T	(German Empire) Krauss Locomotive Works	1899-1901	tram line, branch line	none
B22	01-09	NIS 306-314		0-4-2T	(German Empire) Sächsische Maschinenfabrik	1898	mainline, branch line	B22 07, B22 09, B22 20
B22	10-20	NIS 315-325		0-4-2T	(German Empire) Sächsische Maschinenfabrik	1900-1901	mainline, branch line	B22 07, B22 09, B22 20
B23	01	KSM 16		0-4-0T	(German Empire) Henschel & Son	1900	tram line	B23 01
B24	01-02	MS 10 & 12		0-4-0Tr	(German Empire) Hohenzollern Locomotive Works	1902	tram line	none
B25	01-03	NIS 231-233		0-4-2RT	(German Empire) Maschinenfabrik Esslingen	1902	rack railway, branchline	B25 01, B25 02, B25 03
B25	04-05	NIS 234-235		0-4-2RT	(German Empire) Maschinenfabrik Esslingen	1906	rack railway, branchline	B25 01, B25 02, B25 03
B26	01	KSM 18		0-4-0Tr	(German Empire) Henschel & Son	1908	tram line	none
B27	01-06	SJS 201-206		0-4-2T	(German Empire) Sächsische Maschinenfabrik	1912	mainline	B27 05, B27 11
B27	07-12	SJS 207-212		0-4-2T	(German Empire) Sächsische Maschinenfabrik	1914	mainline	B27 05, B27 11
B27	13-16	SJS 213-216		0-4-2T	(Weimar Republic) Sächsische Maschinenfabrik	1921	mainline	B27 05, B27 11
B50	01-02	SS 214 & 218		2-4-0	(United Kingdom) Sharp, Stewart and Company	1880	mainline	B50 04
B50	03-04	SS 220-221		2-4-0	(United Kingdom) Sharp, Stewart and Company	1881	mainline	B50 04
B50	05-06	SS 224 & 227		2-4-0	(United Kingdom) Sharp, Stewart and Company	1881	mainline	B50 04
B50	07-08	SS 229 & 231		2-4-0	(United Kingdom) Sharp, Stewart and Company	1882	mainline	B50 04
B50	09-11	SS 237 & 239-240		2-4-0	(United Kingdom) Sharp, Stewart and Company	1884	mainline	B50 04
B50	12-13	SS 243 & 245		2-4-0	(United Kingdom) Sharp, Stewart and Company	1884	mainline	B50 04
B50	14	SS 249		2-4-0	(United Kingdom) Sharp, Stewart and Company	1886	mainline	B50 04
B51	01-08	SS 601-608		4-4-0	(German Empire) Hanomag	1900	mainline	B51 12
B51	09-16	SS 609-616		4-4-0	(German Empire) Hanomag	1902-1903	mainline	B51 12
B51	17-20	SS 617-620		4-4-0	(German Empire) Hanomag	1903	mainline	B51 12
B51	21-26	SS 621-626		4-4-0	(German Empire) Sächsische Maschinenfabrik	1905	mainline	B51 12
B51	27-32	SS 627-632		4-4-0	(German Empire) Hanomag	1905	mainline	B51 12
B51	33-35	SS 634-636		4-4-0	(Netherlands) Werkspoor	1907	mainline	B51 12
B51	36-37	SS 637-638		4-4-0	(German Empire) Sächsische Maschinenfabrik	1908	mainline	B51 12
B51	38-39	SS 643-644		4-4-0	(Netherlands) Werkspoor	1910	mainline	B51 12
B51	51	SS 633		4-4-0	(Netherlands) Werkspoor	1907	mainline	B51 12
B51	52-55	SS 639-642		4-4-0	(Netherlands) Werkspoor	1908	mainline	B51 12
B52	01-05	SCS 101-105		0-4-0	(German Empire) Sächsische Maschinenfabrik	1908	mainline	B52 10, B52 12
B52	06-11	SCS 106-111		0-4-0	(German Empire) Sächsische Maschinenfabrik	1911	mainline	B52 10, B52 12
B52	12-21	SCS 612-621		0-4-0	(German Empire) Sächsische Maschinenfabrik	1912	mainline	B52 10, B52 12
B52	22-27	SCS 622-627		0-4-0	(German Empire) Sächsische Maschinenfabrik	1913	mainline	B52 10, B52 12
B53	01-07	SS 651-657		4-4-0	(German Empire) Sächsische Maschinenfabrik	1912	mainline	none
B53	08-11	SS 658-661		4-4-0	(Netherlands) Werkspoor	1914	mainline	none

===== C series (Three Coupled) =====
Class	Unit number	Original number	Image	Axles (Whyte)	Builder(s)	Year built	Initial use	Surviving unit(s)
C10	01-03	SS 16-18, later 21-23		0-6-0T	(United Kingdom) Sharp, Stewart and Company	1880	mainline	none
C11	01-06	SS 303, 305-306, 308-310		2-6-0T	(German Empire) Sächsische Maschinenfabrik	1879	mainline	C11 40, C11 27
C11	07-08	SS 311-312		2-6-0T	(German Empire) Sächsische Maschinenfabrik	1881	mainline	C11 40, C11 27
C11	09	SS 313		2-6-0T	(German Empire) Sächsische Maschinenfabrik	1882	mainline	C11 40, C11 27
C11	10-17	SS 314-321		2-6-0T	(German Empire) Sächsische Maschinenfabrik	1883	mainline	C11 40, C11 27
C11	18-20	SS 322, 324-325		2-6-0T	(German Empire) Sächsische Maschinenfabrik	1886	mainline	C11 40, C11 27
C11	21-25	SS 326-330		2-6-0T	(German Empire) Sächsische Maschinenfabrik	1887	mainline	C11 40, C11 27
C11	26-29	SS 331-334		2-6-0T	(German Empire) Sächsische Maschinenfabrik	1890	mainline	C11 40, C11 27
C11	30	SS 335		2-6-0T	(German Empire) Sächsische Maschinenfabrik	1891	mainline	C11 40, C11 27
C11	31-39	SS 336-345		2-6-0T	(German Empire) Sächsische Maschinenfabrik	1891	mainline	C11 40, C11 27
C11	40-41	SS 346 & 348		2-6-0T	(German Empire) Sächsische Maschinenfabrik	1891	mainline	C11 40, C11 27
C12	01	SS 411		2-6-0T	(German Empire) Sächsische Maschinenfabrik	1893	mainline	C12 06, C12 18, C12 40
C12	02	SS 440		2-6-0T	(German Empire) Sächsische Maschinenfabrik	1895	mainline	C12 06, C12 18, C12 40
C12	03-08	SS 441-445, 447		2-6-0T	(German Empire) Sächsische Maschinenfabrik	1896	mainline	C12 06, C12 18, C12 40
C12	09-16	SS 448-455		2-6-0T	(German Empire) Sächsische Maschinenfabrik	1897	mainline	C12 06, C12 18, C12 40
C12	17-27	SS 456-465, 467		2-6-0T	(German Empire) Sächsische Maschinenfabrik	1896	mainline	C12 06, C12 18, C12 40
C12	28-31	SS 468-471		2-6-0T	(German Empire) Sächsische Maschinenfabrik	1898	mainline	C12 06, C12 18, C12 40
C12	32-36	SS 472-475		2-6-0T	(German Empire) Sächsische Maschinenfabrik	1899	mainline	C12 06, C12 18, C12 40
C12	37-43	SS 476-483		2-6-0T	(German Empire) Sächsische Maschinenfabrik	1902	mainline	C12 06, C12 18, C12 40
C13	01-02	SV 2-3, later SS 502-503		0-6-0T	(Belgium) John Cockerill Company	1894	branch line, construction	none
C13	03-04	SV 5 & 7, later SS 505 & 507		0-6-0T	(Belgium) John Cockerill Company	1894	branch line, construction	none
C13	05-06	SV 12 & 21, later SS 512 & 521		0-6-0T	(Belgium) John Cockerill Company	1894	branch line, construction	none
C14	01-08	SDS 1-8		0-6-0T	(United Kingdom) Beyer, Peacock & Company	1895-1895	mainline, tram line	C14 11, C14 12, C14 14
C14	09-10	SDS 9-10		0-6-0T	(United Kingdom) Beyer, Peacock & Company	1899	mainline, tram line	C14 11, C14 12, C14 14
C14	11-12	SDS 11-12		0-6-0T	(United Kingdom) Beyer, Peacock & Company	1909	mainline, tram line	C14 11, C14 12, C14 14
C14	13-14	SDS 13-14		0-6-0T	(United Kingdom) Beyer, Peacock & Company	1910	mainline, tram line	C14 11, C14 12, C14 14
C15	01-10	SS 85-94		0-6-0T	(Netherlands) Werkspoor	1899-1900	mainline	C15 07
C15	11-20	SS 95-104		0-6-0T	(German Empire) Sächsische Maschinenfabrik	1897-1898	mainline	C15 07
C16	01	NIS 250		0-6-0T	(German Empire) Sächsische Maschinenfabrik	1899	branch line	C16 03
C16	02-03	NIS 252 & 254		0-6-0T	(German Empire) Sächsische Maschinenfabrik	1901	branch line	C16 03
C16	04-07	NIS 258, 260-262		0-6-0T	(German Empire) Sächsische Maschinenfabrik	1908	branch line	C16 03
C17	01	NIS 251		0-6-0T	(German Empire) Sächsische Maschinenfabrik	1899	branch line	C17 04
C17	02-03	NIS 253 & 255		0-6-0T	(German Empire) Sächsische Maschinenfabrik	1901	branch line	C17 04
C17	04-05	NIS 256-257		0-6-0T	(German Empire) Sächsische Maschinenfabrik	1902	branch line	C17 04
C18	01	NIS 259		0-6-0T	(German Empire) Sächsische Maschinenfabrik	1908	branch line	C18 01
C19	01-08	SJS 101-108		0-6-0T	(German Empire) Sächsische Maschinenfabrik	1898-1899	mainline, branch line	C19 12
C19	09-12	SJS 109-112		0-6-0T	(German Empire) Sächsische Maschinenfabrik	1902	mainline, branch line	C19 12
C20	01-06	NIS 351-356		0-6-2T	(German Empire) Sächsische Maschinenfabrik	1903	mainline, branch line	C20 01
C20	07-10	NIS 357-360		0-6-2T	(German Empire) Sächsische Maschinenfabrik	1912	mainline, branch line	C20 01
C21	01	BDSM 9, later SS 113		0-6-0T	(German Empire) Krauss Locomotive Works	1903	branch line, tram line	C21 02, C21 03
C21	02	BDSM 10, later SS 114		0-6-0T	(German Empire) Krauss Locomotive Works	1913	branch line, tram line	C21 02, C21 03
C21	03	MSM 11		0-6-0T	(German Empire) Krauss Locomotive Works	1907	branch line, tram line	C21 02, C21 03
C21	04	MSM 12		0-6-0T	(German Empire) Krauss Locomotive Works	1912	branch line, tram line	C21 02, C21 03
C21	05-06	MSM 15-16		0-6-0T	(Weimar Republic) Krauss Locomotive Works	1926	branch line, tram line	C21 02, C21 03
C22	01	SV 6, later PsSM 6		0-6-0T	(Belgium) John Cockerill Company	1894	branch line, construction	none
C22	02	SV 16, later PsSM 7		0-6-0T	(Belgium) John Cockerill Company	1894	branch line, construction	none
C22	03	PsSM 8		0-6-0T	(Belgium) John Cockerill Company	1910	tram line	none
C23	01	NIS 263		0-6-0T	(German Empire) Sächsische Maschinenfabrik	1908	branch line	C23 01
C24	01-10	NIS 271-280		2-6-2T	(Netherlands) Werkspoor	1909	branch line	C24 07
C24	11-15	NIS 281-285		2-6-2T	(Netherlands) Werkspoor	1911-1912	branch line	C24 07
C25	01-03	PbSM 11-13		0-6-0Tr	(German Empire) Hanomag	1913	tram line	C25 01
C25	04-05	PbSM 14-15		0-6-0Tr	(Weimar Republic) Hanomag	1921	tram line	C25 01
C25	06	PsSM 9		0-6-0Tr	(Weimar Republic) Hanomag	1921	tram line	C25 01
C26	01	KSM 19		0-6-0T	(German Empire) Henschel & Son	1914	branch line, tram line	C26 06
C26	02	KSM 20		0-6-0T	(German Empire) Henschel & Son	1915	branch line, tram line	C26 06
C26	03-05	KSM 21-23		0-6-0T	(Weimar Republic) Henschel & Son	1920	branch line, tram line	C26 06
C26	06-08	KSM 24-26		0-6-0T	(Weimar Republic) Henschel & Son	1921	branch line, tram line	C26 06
C26	09-10	KSM 27-28		0-6-0T	(Weimar Republic) Henschel & Son	1926	branch line, tram line	C26 06
C27	01-14	SS 1101-1114		4-6-4T	(Switzerland) Swiss Locomotive and Machine Works	1916	mainline	C27 10, C27 28
C27	15-24	SS 1115-1124		4-6-4T	(Netherlands) Werkspoor	1919	mainline	C27 10, C27 28
C27	25-34	SS 1125-1134		4-6-4T	(Netherlands) Werkspoor	1920	mainline	C27 10, C27 28
C27	35-39	SS 1135-1139		4-6-4T	(United Kingdom) Armstrong Whitworth	1922	mainline	C27 10, C27 28
C28	01-30	SS 1301-1330		4-6-4T	(Weimar Republic) Henschel & Son	1921	mainline	C28 21
C28	31-45	SS 1331-1345		4-6-4T	(Weimar Republic) Sächsische Maschinenfabrik	1921	mainline	C28 21
C28	46-58	SS 1346-1358		4-6-4T	(Weimar Republic) Maschinenfabrik Esslingen	1922	mainline	C28 21
C29	01-02	MSM 13-14		0-6-0T	(Weimar Republic) Hanomag	1922	tram line	C29 02
C30	01-12	SS 1701-1712		2-6-2T	(Weimar Republic) Hohenzollern Locomotive Works	1929	mainline, branch line	C30 65, C30 82, and an unidentified C30 in Cambodia
C30	13-21	SS 1713-1721		2-6-2T	(Weimar Republic) August Borsig Lokomotiv-Werke	1930	mainline, branch line	C30 65, C30 82, and an unidentified C30 in Cambodia
C30	61-71	SS 1761-1771		2-6-2T	(Netherlands) Werkspoor	1929	mainline, branch line	C30 65, C30 82, and an unidentified C30 in Cambodia
C30	72-83	SS 1772-1783		2-6-2T	(Weimar Republic) Hanomag	1930	mainline, branch line	C30 65, C30 82, and an unidentified C30 in Cambodia
C30	91-93	SS 1791-1793		2-6-2T	(Weimar Republic) August Borsig Lokomotiv-Werke	1930	mainline, branch line	C30 65, C30 82, and an unidentified C30 in Cambodia
C31	01-12	MT 1-12		0-6-0T	(German Empire) Sächsische Maschinenfabrik	1898	mainline (Madura)	none
C31	13-20	MT 13-20		0-6-0T	(German Empire) Sächsische Maschinenfabrik	1900	mainline (Madura)	none
C32	01	JNR C12 94		2-6-2T	(Empire of Japan) Hitachi	1934	shunter, military	none
C32	02	JNR C12 168		2-6-2T	(Empire of Japan) Nippon Sharyo	1938	shunter, military	none
C33	17-20	SSS 17-20		2-6-0T	(German Empire) Maschinenfabrik Esslingen	1891	mainline	C33 18, C33 22, C33 25, and an unidentified C33 in Sijunjung Regency
C33	21-30	SSS 46-55		2-6-0T	(German Empire) Maschinenfabrik Esslingen	1892	mainline	C33 18, C33 22, C33 25, and an unidentified C33 in Sijunjung Regency
C33	31-36	SSS 31-36		2-6-0T	(German Empire) Maschinenfabrik Esslingen	1894	mainline	C33 18, C33 22, C33 25, and an unidentified C33 in Sijunjung Regency
C33	37	SSS 37		2-6-0T	(German Empire) Maschinenfabrik Esslingen	1891	mainline	C33 18, C33 22, C33 25, and an unidentified C33 in Sijunjung Regency
C33	38-39	SSS 59 & 69		2-6-0T	(German Empire) Maschinenfabrik Esslingen	1903-1904	mainline	C33 18, C33 22, C33 25, and an unidentified C33 in Sijunjung Regency
C50	01-05	SS 706-710		4-6-2	(German Empire) Sächsische Maschinenfabrik	1911	mainline	none
C50	06-08	SS 711-712		4-6-2	(Switzerland) Swiss Locomotive and Machine Works	1912	mainline	none
C50	08-11	SS 713-716		4-6-2	(German Empire) Sächsische Maschinenfabrik	1914	mainline	none
C50	51-55	SS 701-705		4-6-2	(Switzerland) Swiss Locomotive and Machine Works	1911	mainline	none
C51	01-10	NIS 371-380		4-6-0	(United Kingdom) Beyer, Peacock & Company	1913	mainline	C51 01
C52	1-5	NIS 381-385		4-6-0	(Netherlands) Werkspoor	1919	mainline	C52 17 (preserved as SRT 756 in Thailand)
C52	6-10	NIS 386-390		4-6-0	(Weimar Republic) Henschel & Son	1921	mainline	C52 17 (preserved as SRT 756 in Thailand)
C52	11-15	NIS 391-395		4-6-0	(Netherlands) Werkspoor	1923	mainline	C52 17 (preserved as SRT 756 in Thailand)
C52	16-20	NIS 396-400		4-6-0	(United Kingdom) Beyer, Peacock & Company	1922	mainline	C52 17 (preserved as SRT 756 in Thailand)
C53	01-12	SS 1001-1012		4-6-2	(Netherlands) Werkspoor	1920	mainline	C53 17
C53	13-20	SS 1013-1020		4-6-2	(Netherlands) Werkspoor	1921-1922	mainline	C53 17
C54	01-13	SCS 201-213		4-6-0	(Weimar Republic) Sächsische Maschinenfabrik	1922	mainline	C54 17 and an unidentified C54 in Kampar Regency
C54	14-19	SCS 214-219		4-6-0	(United Kingdom) Beyer, Peacock & Company	1922	mainline	C54 17 and an unidentified C54 in Kampar Regency

===== D series (Four Coupled) =====
Class	Unit number	Original number	Image	Axles (Whyte)	Builder(s)	Year built	Initial use	Surviving unit(s)
D10	01-06	SJS 301-306		0-8-0T	(German Empire) Sächsische Maschinenfabrik	1913	branch line, tram line	D10 07
D10	07-10	SDS 201-204		0-8-0T	(German Empire) Sächsische Maschinenfabrik	1914	branch line, tram line	D10 07
D10	11	SDS 205		0-8-0T	(German Empire) Sächsische Maschinenfabrik	1915	branch line, tram line	D10 07
D11	01-02	MS 14-15		0-8-0T	(German Empire) Hohenzollern Locomotive Works	1913-1914	branch line, tram line	D11 07
D11	03-05	MS 16-18		0-8-0T	(Weimar Republic) Hohenzollern Locomotive Works	1920	branch line, tram line	D11 07
D11	06-08	MS 19-21		0-8-0T	(Weimar Republic) Hohenzollern Locomotive Works	1921	branch line, tram line	D11 07
D11	09-11	MS 22-24		0-8-0T	(Weimar Republic) Hohenzollern Locomotive Works	1924	branch line, tram line	D11 07
D13	01-03	SDS 51-53		0-8-0T	(Weimar Republic) Hohenzollern Locomotive Works	1922	branch line	none
D14	01-12	SS 1401-1412		2-8-2T	(Weimar Republic) Hanomag	1921	mainline, shunter	D14 10
D14	13-24	SS 1413-1424		2-8-2T	(Netherlands) Werkspoor	1922	mainline, shunter	D14 10
D15	01-05	SJS 307-311		0-8-0T	(Weimar Republic) Hanomag	1931	branch line, tram line	D15 05
D16	01-04	MT 21-24		0-8-0T	(German Empire) August Borsig Lokomotiv-Werke	1912	mainline (Madura)	none
D16	05-06	MT 25 & 28		0-8-0T	(German Empire) August Borsig Lokomotiv-Werke	1913	mainline (Madura)	none
D16	07-11	MT 29-33		0-8-0T	(German Empire) August Borsig Lokomotiv-Werke	1914	mainline (Madura)	none
D17	01-02	MT 26-27		0-8-0T	(Weimar Republic) Sächsische Maschinenfabrik	1922	mainline (Madura)	none
D18	01-02	SSS 101-102		0-8-2RT	(German Empire) Maschinenfabrik Esslingen	1913	rack railway, mainline	none
D18	03	SSS 103		0-8-2RT	(Switzerland) Swiss Locomotive and Machine Works	1913	rack railway, mainline	none
D50	01-06	SS 901-906		2-8-0	(German Empire) Hanomag	1914	mainline	D50 11
D50	07-12	SS 907-912		2-8-0	(German Empire) Sächsische Maschinenfabrik	1914	mainline	D50 11
D50	13-14	SS 914-915		2-8-0	(Switzerland) Swiss Locomotive and Machine Works	1914	mainline	D50 11
D50	15-20	SS 919-924		2-8-0	(Switzerland) Swiss Locomotive and Machine Works	1914	mainline	D50 11
D50	21-25	SS 925-929		2-8-0	(Netherlands) Werkspoor	1914	mainline	D50 11
D50	26-28	SS 930-932		2-8-0	(Netherlands) Werkspoor	1921	mainline	D50 11
D50	29-38	SS 933-942		2-8-0	(Weimar Republic) Hanomag	1921	mainline	D50 11
D50	51-55	ZSS 951-955		2-8-0	(Weimar Republic) Sächsische Maschinenfabrik	1925	mainline	D50 11
D50	56-61	ZSS 956-961		2-8-0	(Weimar Republic) Hanomag	1926	mainline	D50 11
D50	62-65	SS 913, 916-918		2-8-0	(Switzerland) Swiss Locomotive and Machine Works	1914	mainline	D50 11
D51	01-10	SS 1501-1510		2-8-2	(Weimar Republic) Sächsische Maschinenfabrik	1920	mainline	D51 06
D52	001-100			2-8-2	(West Germany) Krupp	1951-1952	mainline	D52 099

===== E series =====
Class	Unit number	Original number	Image	Axles (Whyte)	Builder(s)	Year built	Initial use	Surviving unit(s)
E10	04-12	SSS 104-112		0-10-0RT	(Switzerland) Swiss Locomotive and Machine Works	1921	rack railway, mainline	E10 16
E10	13-18	SSS 113-118		0-10-0RT	(Weimar Republic) Maschinenfabrik Esslingen	1921	rack railway, mainline	E10 16
E10	19-21	SSS 119-121		0-10-0RT	(Switzerland) Swiss Locomotive and Machine Works	1926	rack railway, mainline	E10 16
E10	22-25	SSS 122-125		0-10-0RT	(Weimar Republic) Maschinenfabrik Esslingen	1928	rack railway, mainline	E10 16
E10	51-54			0-10-0RT	(West Germany) Maschinenfabrik Esslingen	1964	rack railway, mainline	E10 60
E10	55-60			0-10-0RT	(West Germany) Maschinenfabrik Esslingen	1966	rack railway, mainline	E10 60
E10	61-67			0-10-0RT	(Japan) Nippon Sharyo	1967	rack railway, mainline	E10 60

===== F series =====
Class	Unit number	Original number	Image	Axles (Whyte)	Builder(s)	Year built	Initial use	Surviving unit(s)
F10	01	SS 801		2-12-2T	(German Empire) Hanomag	1912	mainline	F10 02, F10 15
F10	02-10	SS 802-810		2-12-2T	(German Empire) Hanomag	1913	mainline	F10 02, F10 15
F10	11-16	SS 811-816		2-12-2T	(German Empire) Hanomag	1914-1915	mainline	F10 02, F10 15
F10	17-19	SS 817-819		2-12-2T	(Netherlands) Werkspoor	1915	mainline	F10 02, F10 15
F10	20-23	SS 820-823		2-12-2T	(Netherlands) Werkspoor	1917	mainline	F10 02, F10 15
F10	24-26	SSS 130-132		2-12-2T	(Netherlands) Werkspoor	1915	mainline	F10 02, F10 15
F10	27-28	SSS 133-134		2-12-2T	(Weimar Republic) Hanomag	1920	mainline	F10 02, F10 15

===== Mallets =====
Class	Unit number	Original number	Image	Axles (Whyte)	Builder(s)	Year built	Initial use	Surviving unit(s)
BB10	01-08	SS 501-508		0-4-4-2T	(German Empire) Sächsische Maschinenfabrik	1899	mainline	BB10 12
BB10	09-12	SS 509-512		0-4-4-2T	(German Empire) Sächsische Maschinenfabrik	1907	mainline	BB10 12
BB10	13-16	SS 513-516		0-4-4-2T	(German Empire) Maschinenfabrik L. Schwarzkopff	1908	mainline	BB10 12
CC10	01-05	SS 521-525		2-6-6-0T	(German Empire) Sächsische Maschinenfabrik	1904	mainline	none
CC10	06-13	SS 526-533		2-6-6-0T	(German Empire) Sächsische Maschinenfabrik	1905	mainline	none
CC10	13-19	SS 534-539		2-6-6-0T	(German Empire) Maschinenfabrik L. Schwarzkopff	1909	mainline	none
CC10	20-23	SS 540-543		2-6-6-0T	(German Empire) Sächsische Maschinenfabrik	1909	mainline	none
CC10	24-33	SS 551-560		2-6-6-0T	(Netherlands) Werkspoor	1910	mainline	none
CC10	34	SS 561		2-6-6-0T	(Netherlands) Werkspoor	1911	mainline	none
CC50	01-08	SS 1601-1608		2-6-6-0	(Netherlands) Werkspoor	1928	mainline	CC50 01, CC50 22, CC50 29
CC50	09-18	SS 1609-1618		2-6-6-0	(Switzerland) Swiss Locomotive and Machine Works	1927	mainline	CC50 01, CC50 22, CC50 29
CC50	19-24	SS 1619-1624		2-6-6-0	(Netherlands) Werkspoor	1928	mainline	CC50 01, CC50 22, CC50 29
CC50	25-30	SS 1625-1630		2-6-6-0	(Switzerland) Swiss Locomotive and Machine Works	1928	mainline	CC50 01, CC50 22, CC50 29
DD50	01-08	SS 1201-1208		2-8-8-0	(United States) American Locomotive Company	1916	mainline	none
DD51	01-12	SS 1209-1220		2-8-8-0	(United States) American Locomotive Company	1919	mainline	none
DD52	01-03	SS 1251-1253		2-8-8-0	(Weimar Republic) Hanomag	1923	mainline	none
DD52	04-06	SS 1254-1256		2-8-8-0	(Weimar Republic) Sächsische Maschinenfabrik	1924	mainline	none
DD52	07-10	SS 1257-1260		2-8-8-0	(Netherlands) Werkspoor	1923	mainline	none

===== DSM series =====
Steam locomotives operated by the Deli Railway Company (DSM) in North Sumatra. Unlike steam locomotives operated by other railway operators in the former Dutch East Indies, DSM locomotives never received renumbering by the Japanese occupation authority, and thus retained their original number.

Unit number	Image	Axles (Whyte)	Builder(s)	Year built	Surviving unit(s)
1-2		0-4-0T	(German Empire) Maschinenfabrik Christian Hagans	1883	none
3-7		0-6-0T/ 0-4-2T (Note: DSM 3, 6-9, 13-14, 16 were converted to 0-4-2T in 1930s)	(German Empire) Hohenzollern Locomotive Works	1884	DSM 14 (preserved as DSM 22 at Pulu Brayan workshop)
8-9		0-6-0T/ 0-4-2T	(German Empire) Hohenzollern Locomotive Works	1886	DSM 14 (preserved as DSM 22 at Pulu Brayan workshop)
10-13		0-6-0T/ 0-4-2T	(German Empire) Hohenzollern Locomotive Works	1888	DSM 14 (preserved as DSM 22 at Pulu Brayan workshop)
14-15		0-6-0T/ 0-4-2T	(German Empire) Hohenzollern Locomotive Works	1890	DSM 14 (preserved as DSM 22 at Pulu Brayan workshop)
16		0-6-0T/ 0-4-2T	(German Empire) Hohenzollern Locomotive Works	1891	DSM 14 (preserved as DSM 22 at Pulu Brayan workshop)
17-20		0-6-4T/ 2-4-4T (Note: All units were rebuilt to 2-4-4T)	(German Empire) Sächsische Maschinenfabrik	1900	none
21-22		0-6-4T/ 2-4-4T	(German Empire) Sächsische Maschinenfabrik	1901	none
23-25		0-6-4T/ 2-4-4T	(German Empire) Sächsische Maschinenfabrik	1902	none
26-29		0-4-4T	(German Empire) Hohenzollern Locomotive Works	1903	DSM 28
1-2 (2nd)		0-4-4T	(German Empire) Hohenzollern Locomotive Works	1904	DSM 28
30		0-4-0T	(German Empire) Krauss Locomotive Works	1897	none
31-33		2-6-4T	(German Empire) Sächsische Maschinenfabrik	1913	DSM 38, DSM 55
34-38		2-6-4T	(German Empire) Sächsische Maschinenfabrik	1914	DSM 38, DSM 55
39-44		2-6-4T	(Netherlands) Werkspoor	1915	DSM 38, DSM 55
50-55		2-6-4T	(Netherlands) Werkspoor	1920	DSM 38, DSM 55
57-59		2-6-4T	(Netherlands) Werkspoor	1921	DSM 38, DSM 55
45-48		2-8-4T	(Netherlands) Werkspoor	1916	DSM 48
49		0-4-0T	(German Empire) Maschinenfabrik Christian Hagans	1915	none
56		0-6-0T/ 0-4-2T (Note: Converted to 0-4-2T in 1930s)	(Dutch East Indies) DSM Pulu Brayan Workshop	1920	none
60-62		2-4-2T	(Weimar Republic) Hanomag	1928	none
63-69		2-4-2T	(Weimar Republic) Hanomag	1929	none

==== Track gauge 750 mm (2 ft 5 1/2 in) ====
- Locomotive BB84, was built by Nippon Sharyo (1962)

==== Track gauge 600 mm (1 ft 11 5/8 in) ====
- See also - 2 ft and 600 mm gauge railways

Class	Unit number	Original number	Image	Axles (Whyte)	Builder(s)	Year built	Surviving unit(s)
TC10	01-06	SS 501T-506T		0-6-0T	(German Empire) Sächsische Maschinenfabrik	1915	TC10 08, TC10 11, TC10 15
TC10	07-10	SS 507T-510T		0-6-0T	(Weimar Republic) Sächsische Maschinenfabrik	1920	TC10 08, TC10 11, TC10 15
TC10	11-15	SS 511T-515T		0-6-0T	(Weimar Republic) Sächsische Maschinenfabrik	1922	TC10 08, TC10 11, TC10 15
TD10	01-03	SS 401T-403T		0-8-0T	(Netherlands) Werkspoor	1926	TD10 02
		DSM 103		0-4-0T	(United States) Baldwin Locomotive Works	1917	none
		DSM 104		0-4-0T	(Weimar Republic) Orenstein & Koppel	1920	none
		DSM 105		0-6-0T	(Weimar Republic) Orenstein & Koppel	1920	none
		DSM 106-107		0-6-0T	(Netherlands) Du Croo & Brauns	1926	none
		DSM 108		0-4-0T	(Netherlands) Du Croo & Brauns	1920	none
		DSM 109		0-6-0T	(Netherlands) Du Croo & Brauns	1929	none

=== Industrial operator ===
==== Sugar Cane Railway ====
===== West Java =====
Cirebon Sugar Mill

Kadhipaten
Unit Number	Nameplate	Axles(Whyte)	Image	Builder(s)	Year built	Note	status
1		0-8-0		(Netherlands) Du Croo & Brauns	194/1929(p)		Scrapped
2		0-8-0T		(Netherlands) Du Croo & Brauns	154/1928(p)		Scrapped
3		0-8-0T		(Netherlands) Du Croo & Brauns	39/1924(p)		Scrapped
4		0-8-0T		(Weimar Republic) J.A Maffei	4252/1921(b)		Scrapped
5		0-8-0T		(Weimar Republic) J.A Maffei	3972/1920(m)		Scrapped
6		0-8-0T		(German Empire) Orenstein & Koppel	5357/1912	ex-Tersana Baru	Scrapped

Gempol
Unit Number	Nameplate	Axles(Whyte)	Image	Builder(s)	Year built	Note	status
D4-1		0-8-0T		(Netherlands) Du Croo & Brauns	80/1926(b), 84/1926(p)		Scrapped
D4-2		0-8-0T		(Netherlands) Du Croo & Brauns	140/1928		Scrapped
D4-3		0-8-0T		(Netherlands) Du Croo & Brauns	141/1928		Scrapped
D4-4		0-8-0T		(Weimar Republic) Orenstein & Koppel	10449/1923		Scrapped
D4-5		0-8-0T		(Netherlands) Du Croo & Brauns	27/1924(b)		Scrapped
D4-6		0-8-0T		(Weimar Republic) Orenstein & Koppel	10459/1923(m), boiler:DB 84/1926(b)		Scrapped
D4-7		0-8-0T		(Weimar Republic) Orenstein & Koppel	12057/1929(m), 12058/1929(b,m)		Scrapped
D4-8		0-8-0T		(Weimar Republic) Orenstein & Koppel	12058/1929(m), 12056/1929(m)		Scrapped
D4-9		0-8-0T		(Netherlands) Du Croo & Brauns	10/1923		Scrapped
C3-10		0-8-0T		(Weimar Republic) Henschel & Sohn	18994/1921		Unknown
D4-11		0-6-0T		(Weimar Republic) Orenstein & Koppel	12056/1929(m), 12057/1929(b)		Scrapped
D4-12		0-8-0T		(German Empire) Henschel & Sohn	10437/1911		Preserved at Taman Mini

Jatiwangi
Unit Number	Nameplate	Axles(Whyte)	Image	Builder(s)	Year built	Note	status
1	KANCIL MANIS	0-6-0T		(United States) Vulcan Iron Works (Wilkes-Barre)	2602/1917		Scrapped
2	BERUANG	0-6-0T		(United States) Vulcan Iron Works (Wilkes-Barre)	3479/1920(b)		Scrapped
3	BADAK	0-6-0T		(United States) Vulcan Iron Works (Wilkes-Barre)	3042/1920(p)		Scrapped
4	GAJAH	0-8-0T		(Weimar Republic) Orenstein & Koppel	11580/1928(m)		Scrapped
5	BANTENG	0-8-0T		(German Empire) Orenstein & Koppel	5242/1912(m)		Scrapped
6	BISON	0-8-0T		(German Empire) Orenstein & Koppel	4444/1910(m)		Scrapped

Tersana Baru
Unit Number	Nameplate	Axles(Whyte)	Image	Builder(s)	Year built	Note	status
3	NT-3	0-8-0T	Tersana Baru 3	(Weimar Republic) Arnold Jung	3724/1925		Scrapped
4	NT-4	0-8-0T		(Weimar Republic) Arnold Jung	3725/1925		Scrapped
7	NT-7	0-8-0T		(Netherlands) Du Croo & Brauns	24/1924		Scrapped
8		0-6-0T		(German Empire) Arnold Jung	543/1901		Scrapped
9	NT-9	0-4-4-0T		(German Empire) Arnold Jung	1717/1911		Scrapped
10	NT-10	0-4-4-0T		(German Empire) Arnold Jung	2190/1914		Scrapped
11	NT-11	0-8-0T		(Netherlands) Du Croo & Brauns	23/1924		Scrapped
12	NT-12	0-4-2T		(German Empire) Borsig	5171/1903	sold to Madukismo for tourist operation	Stored
12A	NT-13	0-4-4-0T		(German Empire) Orenstein & Koppel	1082/1903	Boiler to Tersana Baru 12, and previously used by Tersana Baru no.14	Scrapped
14	NT-14	0-8-0T		(German Empire) Orenstein & Koppel	6040/1912		Scrapped
16	NT-16	0-8-0T		(Netherlands) Du Croo & Brauns	64/1925		Scrapped
18	NT-2	0-8-0T	Tersana Baru 18 (in front)	(Weimar Republic) Arnold Jung	3433/1923		Scrapped
19	NT-1	0-8-0T		(Weimar Republic) Arnold Jung	3434/1923		Scrapped
20		0-8-0T	Tersana Baru 20	(German Empire) J.A Maffei	3649/1911		Scrapped
(1)	GEMPOL 1	0-8-0T	Tersana Baru 01 II	(Netherlands) Du Croo & Brauns	80/1926(b), 84/1926(p)	ex-Gempol	Stored
(2)	GEMPOL 3	0-8-0T	Tersana Baru 02 II, ex PG Gempol	(Netherlands) Du Croo & Brauns	141/1928	ex-Gempol	Scrapped
(6)		0-8-0T	Tersana Baru 06	(Weimar Republic) Orenstein & Koppel	10459/1923(m), boiler:DB 84/1926(b)	ex-Gempol	Stored
(8)		0-8-0T		(Weimar Republic) J.A Maffei	4249/1921	ex-Ketanggungan Barat	Scrapped
(9)		0-8-0T		(German Empire) Orenstein & Koppel	3779/1909	ex-Ketanggungan Barat	Scrapped
(11)		0-8-0T		(Netherlands) Du Croo & Brauns	24/1924(p), 172/1929(m)	ex-Ketanggungan Barat	Scrapped

Sindangloet
Unit Number	Nameplate	Axles(Whyte)	Image	Builder(s)	Year built	Note	status
1		0-6-0T	Sindanglaut 1	(German Empire) Arnold Jung	477/1901		Scrapped
2		0-6-0T		(German Empire) Arnold Jung	478/1901		Scrapped
3		0-6-0T		(German Empire) Arnold Jung	479/1901		Scrapped
4		0-6-0T	Sindanglaut 4	(German Empire) Arnold Jung	480/1901		Scrapped
5		0-6-0T		(German Empire) Arnold Jung	481/1901		Scrapped
6		0-6-0T	Sindanglaut 6	(German Empire) Orenstein & Koppel	6959/1913		Scrapped
7		0-8-0T	Sindanglaut 7	(Weimar Republic) Borsig	11018/1921		Scrapped
8		0-8-0T	Sindanglaut 8	(Netherlands) Du Croo & Brauns	25/1924		Stored
9		0-6-0T		(Weimar Republic) Maschinenfabrik L. Schwarzkopff	9407/1928		Scrapped
10		0-8-0T	Sindanglaut 10	(Weimar Republic) Arnold Jung	3432/1923		Scrapped
11		0-8-0T	Sindanglaut 11	(German Empire) Arnold Jung	2125/1913		Scrapped
12		0-8-0T	Sindanglaut 12	(Weimar Republic) Orenstein & Koppel	11603/1928		Scrapped
13		0-8-0T	Sindanglaut 13	(Weimar Republic) Orenstein & Koppel	10591/1923		Scrapped
(4)	GEMPOL 2	0-8-0T	Sindanglaut 4 II	(Netherlands) Du Croo & Brauns	140/1928	ex-Gempol	Scrapped

===== Central Java =====
Ketanggungan Barat
Unit Number	Nameplate	Axles(Whyte)	Image	Builder(s)	Year built	Note	status
1		0-8-0T		(German Empire) Orenstein & Koppel	4358/1910		Scrapped
2		0-8-0T		(German Empire) Orenstein & Koppel	4144/1910		Scrapped
3		0-8-0T		(German Empire) Orenstein & Koppel	5858/1912		Scrapped
4		0-8-0T		(Weimar Republic) Orenstein & Koppel	11805/1929		Stored
5		0-4-4-0T		(Netherlands) Du Croo & Brauns	191/1929	Only known DB Mallet in Cirebon, and has a superheater	Scrapped
6		0-8-0T		(German Empire) J.A Maffei	3654/1911		Stored
7		0-8-0T		(German Empire) J.A Maffei	3655/1911		Stored
8		0-8-0T		(Weimar Republic) J.A Maffei	4249/1921		Move to Tersana
9		0-8-0T		(German Empire) Orenstein & Koppel	3779/1909		Move to Tersana
10		0-8-0T		(Weimar Republic) Hanomag	10407/1925		Stored
11		0-8-0T		(Netherlands) Du Croo & Brauns	24/1924(p), 172/1929(m)		Move to Tersana

Banjaratma
Unit Number	Nameplate	Axles(Whyte)	Image	Builder(s)	Year built	Note	status
1		0-8-0T	Bandjaratma 1	(German Empire) Orenstein & Koppel	4341/1910		Scrapped
2		0-8-0T		(German Empire) Orenstein & Koppel	9428/1921(b), 4710/1911(m)		Scrapped
3		0-8-0T		(German Empire) Orenstein & Koppel	5396/1912		Scrapped
4		0-8-0T	Bandjaratma 4	(Weimar Republic) Orenstein & Koppel	9508/1921(b), 9505/1921(m)		Scrapped
5		0-8-0T		(Weimar Republic) Orenstein & Koppel	9504/1921(b), 5398/1912(m)		Scrapped
6		0-6-0T		(United States) Vulcan Iron Works (Wilkes-Barre)	3032/1917		Scrapped
7		0-6-0T	Bandjaratma 7	(United States) Vulcan Iron Works (Wilkes-Barre)	????/1917		Scrapped
(4)		0-8-0T		(Nazi Germany) Orenstein & Koppel	13180/1938	ex-Colomadu-4, Only Known O&K with inside frame that using Klien-Lindner	Scrapped
(8)	TJEPPER 4	0-6-0T		(German Empire) Arnold Jung	818/1905	ex-Ceper, renamed as 8	Scrapped

Jatibarang
Unit Number	Nameplate	Axles(Whyte)	Image	Builder(s)	Year built	Note	status
1A		0-6-0T	Djatibarang 1	(Belgium) Couillet	1572/1910	older sister of Pangka no.7, both of them came from Adiwerna along with 3A	Sold to Tasikmadu as tourist train
2		0-6-0	Djatibarang 2	(Belgium) Couillet	1574/1910	this locomotive uses a boiler from an unknown Henschel	Preserved
3A		0-8-0T		(German Empire) Orenstein & Koppel	4491/1910	ex-Adiwerna 3A, this tiny O&K are using a rare Allen-Valve gear	move to Pangka
4		0-8-0T		(German Empire) Arnold Jung	2079/1913		Preserved
5		0-8-0T		(German Empire) Arnold Jung	2387/1916	last known steam locomotive that still operated in Jatibarang.	Preserved
6		0-8-0T		(Weimar Republic) Arnold Jung	3091/1920	only known Jatibarang Locomotive to have been Scrapped	Scrapped
7		0-8-0T		(Weimar Republic) Arnold Jung	3616/1924	unlike 3,4,5,6, and 11, this one is bigger	Preserved
8		0-6-0T	Djatibarang 8	(German Empire) Arnold Jung	2299/1915		Preserved
9	JATIBARANG 9	0-4-4-0T	Djatibarang 9	(Weimar Republic) Arnold Jung	4878/1930	last Mallet type Locomotive built by Arnold Jung	Sold to Statfold Barn Railway
10		0-8-0	Djatibarang 10	(German Empire) Arnold Jung	1698/1911		Plinthed in Banjaratma
11		0-8-0T	Djatibarang 11	(German Empire) Arnold Jung	2078/1913	actually no.3	Preserved
12		0-8-0T	Djatibarang 12	(Weimar Republic) Orenstein & Koppel	12375/1931	twin of Pangka 10 & Cepiring 9, both of them also came from Pamanukan	Preserved

Pangkah
Unit Number	Nameplate	Axles(Whyte)	Image	Builder(s)	Year built	Note	status
1		0-6-2T		(German Empire) Arnold Jung	2294/1915		Stored
2		0-6-2T	Pangka 2	(German Empire) Arnold Jung	2388/1915		Stored
3		0-6-2T	Pangka 3	(Weimar Republic) Arnold Jung	3090/1920		Stored
4	PANGKA-4K	0-6-2T		(Weimar Republic) Arnold Jung	3182/1920		Move to Sragi as PANGKA-4K
5		0-6-2T	Pangka 5	(Weimar Republic) Arnold Jung	3181/1920		Stored
6	PANGKA-6K	0-6-2T		(Weimar Republic) Arnold Jung	4281/1921		Move to Sragi as PANGKA-6K
7		0-6-0T	Pangka 7	(Belgium) Couillet	1573/1910		Stored
8		0-8-0T		(German Empire) Arnold Jung	1874/1912	similar to 0-8-0T at Jatibarang	Stored
9		0-8-0T	Pangka 9	(German Empire) Orenstein & Koppel	7875/1914		Preserved
10		0-8-0T	Pangka 10	(Weimar Republic) Orenstein & Koppel	12457/1931	twin of Jatibarang 12 & Cepiring 9, both of them also came from Pamanukan	Stored
(4)		0-8-0T		(German Empire) Orenstein & Koppel	4491/1910	ex-Jatibarang 3A, renamed as 4	Unknown, Believed Scrapped

Sragi/Comal Baru
Unit Number	Nameplate	Axles(Whyte)	Image	Builder(s)	Year built	Note	status
1 (15)	S.S TRAM BIMA	0-4-2T		(German Empire) Krauss	4045/1899	Actually 15, Swapped identity with 1	Sold to Statfold barn Railway
2	SRAGI II	0-4-2T		(German Empire) Orenstein & Koppel	722/1902		last known stored in Comal shed, Unknown
3	SRAGI III	0-4-2T		(German Empire) Orenstein & Koppel	2648/1907		last known stored in Comal shed, Unknown
4	SRAGI IV	0-8-0T		(Netherlands) Du Croo & Brauns	40/1925		last known stored in Comal shed, Unknown
5	SRAGI V	0-10-0T	Sragie 05	(Weimar Republic) Maschinenfabrik L. Schwarzkopff	9316/1928		Stored
6	SRAGI VI	0-10-0T		(Weimar Republic) Maschinenfabrik L. Schwarzkopff	9317/1928		Stored
7	SRAGI VII	0-10-0T		(Weimar Republic) Maschinenfabrik L. Schwarzkopff	9318/1928		Stored
8		0-8-0T	Sragie 08	(Weimar Republic) Orenstein & Koppel	10918/1925	Originally came from Comal	Stored
9		0-8-0T	Sragie 09	(Weimar Republic) Hanomag	10411/1925		Dumped
10		0-4-0T		(Weimar Republic) Henschel & Sohn	20538/1926	swapped identity with 11	Stored
11		0-4-0T		(Weimar Republic) Henschel & Sohn	20537/1926	swapped identity with 10	Stored
12		0-8-0T		(German Empire) Sächsische Maschinenfabrik	3548/1912	ex SS-202T	Stored
13		0-8-0T		(German Empire) Sächsische Maschinenfabrik	3547/1912	ex SS-201T, Unlike other, this one had Klien Lindner Axle	last known stored in Comal shed, Unknown
14	MAX	0-6-0T	Sragie 14	(Weimar Republic) Orenstein & Koppel	10750/1923		Sold to Statfold barn Railway
15 (1)		0-4-2T	Sragie 15	(France) Decauville	301/1901	Actually 1, Swapped identity with 15, The sole surviving Decauville in Indonesia	Dumped
16		0-8-0T		(German Empire) Sächsische Maschinenfabrik	3549/1912	ex SS-203T	Stored
17		0-8-0T		(German Empire) Arnold Jung	1699/1911	Younger sister of Jatibarang 10	Stored
18		0-8-0T		(German Empire) Sächsische Maschinenfabrik	3550/1912	ex SS-301T. This one has a smaller tank, similar to TD10	last known stored in Comal shed, Unknown
19		0-8-0T		(Weimar Republic) Orenstein & Koppel	9297/1921	Originally came from Comal	Stored
20		0-8-0T		(Weimar Republic) Orenstein & Koppel	9298/1921	Originally came from Comal	Stored
4K	PANGKA-4K	0-6-2T		(Weimar Republic) Arnold Jung	3182/1920	Formerly Pangka 4	last known stored in Comal shed, Unknown
6K	PANGKA-6K	0-6-2T		(Weimar Republic) Arnold Jung	4289/1929	Formerly Pangka 6	last known stored in Comal shed, Unknown
(1)		0-6-0T		(Weimar Republic) Arnold Jung	????/????		Preserved
?		0-6-0T		(Weimar Republic) Arnold Jung	????/????		Dumped
21		0-4-0T		(Weimar Republic) Henschel & Sohn	20577/1926		Scrapped
(3)		0-8-0T		(German Empire) Orenstein & Koppel	6998/1913		Dumped
?		0-8-0T		(Weimar Republic) Orenstein & Koppel	????/????	Chassis remains	Dumped

Sumberharjo
Unit Number	Nameplate	Axles(Whyte)	Image	Builder(s)	Year built	Note	status
1	S1	0-4-2T		(German Empire) Borsig	7084/1909		Stored
2	S2	0-8-0T		(German Empire) Orenstein & Koppel	5439/1912		Scrapped
3	S3	0-8-0T	Sumberhardjo 03	(German Empire) Orenstein & Koppel	5857/1912		Stored
4		0-8-0T		(German Empire) Orenstein & Koppel	4143/1910	Originally from Paiton	Stored
5	S5	0-8-0T		(United States) American Locomotive Company	58504/1918	Sole Surviving Locomotive made by ALCO in Indonesia	Preserved
6		0-8-0T	Sumberhardjo 06	(Netherlands) Du Croo & Brauns	12/1923		Stored
7	S7	0-8-0T		(Weimar Republic) Orenstein & Koppel	11804/1929	Largest Known Modern O&K in Central Java	Stored
8	S8	0-4-4-0T	Sumberhardjo 08	(German Empire) Arnold Jung	1441/1909		Scrapped
9	S9	0-8-0T		(Netherlands) Du Croo & Brauns	81/1925		Preserved in Stoomtrein Museum Katwijk, restored to working order
10		0-8-0T	Sumberhardjo 10	(Netherlands) Du Croo & Brauns	29/1924		Stored
11		0-8-0T	Sumberhardjo 11	(Netherlands) Du Croo & Brauns	21/1924		Stored
12		0-4-4-0T		(German Empire) Arnold Jung	1438/1909	Dumped alongside ex Kalibagor Fleet	Dumped
(4)	NDRIYA	0-4-4-0T		(German Empire) Borsig	7083/1908	Ex-Kalibagor, Never used	Dumped
(5)	BRAWIJAYA	0-8-0T		(Weimar Republic) J.A Maffei	3967/1920	Ex-Kalibagor, Never used	Dumped, Gone in 2023

Cepiring
Unit Number	Nameplate	Axles(Whyte)	Image	Builder(s)	Year built	Note	status
1		0-8-0T		(Weimar Republic) Orenstein & Koppel	9299/1921	Originally came from Comal	Preserved
2	TJEPIRING 2	0-8-0T		(Netherlands) Du Croo & Brauns	7/1922	Lowest numbered locomotive from Ducroo and Brauns recorded in Java	Preserved
3		0-8-0T		(German Empire) Orenstein & Koppel	5241/1912		Preserved
4	TJEPIRING 4	0-8-0T		(Netherlands) Du Croo & Brauns	62/1925		Preserved
5	TJEPIRING 5	0-8-0T		(Netherlands) Du Croo & Brauns	11/1923		Preserved
6		0-4-0T		(Weimar Republic) Henschel & Sohn	17516/1925		Preserved
7		0-8-0T		(German Empire) Orenstein & Koppel	4471/1911		Preserved
8		0-8-0T		(Weimar Republic) Orenstein & Koppel	6656/1913		Preserved
9		0-8-0T		(Weimar Republic) Orenstein & Koppel	11895/1929	twin of Jatibarang 12 & Pangka 10, both of them also came from Pamanukan	Preserved

Rendeng
Unit Number	Nameplate	Axles(Whyte)	Image	Builder(s)	Year built	Note	status
2	TANDJONGMODJO V	0-8-0T	Rendeng 02	(German Empire) Orenstein & Koppel	5199/1911	originally came from Tanjungmojo	Stored
3	believed to be TANDJONGMODJO VI	0-8-0T		(German Empire) Orenstein & Koppel	5200/1911	Came from same mill as Rendeng 2	Stored
4		0-8-0T		(German Empire) Orenstein & Koppel	5266/1911		Stored
5		0-8-0T		(Weimar Republic) Orenstein & Koppel	9422/1921		Stored
6	RENDENG 6	0-8-0T		(German Empire) Orenstein & Koppel	7891/1914		Stored
7	RENDENG 7	0-8-0T		(Weimar Republic) J.A Maffei	3968/1920		Stored
8	RENDENG 8	0-8-0T	Rendeng 08	(Weimar Republic) Orenstein & Koppel	12262/1932		Sold to Gondang Baru

Gondang Baru
Unit Number	Nameplate	Axles(Whyte)	Images	Builder(s)	Year built	Note	status
1	MERAPI	0-8-0T	Gondang Baru 01	(Weimar Republic) Linke-Hofmann	2465/1922		Unknown, Believed scrapped
2	MERBABU	0-8-0T		(Weimar Republic) Linke-Hofmann	2466/1922	Sole surviving Linke-Hofmann Locomotive in Indonesia	Dumped
3	SLAMET	0-8-0T		(Weimar Republic) Orenstein & Koppel	11298/1927		Dumped
4	BRAMA	0-8-0T		(Weimar Republic) Orenstein & Koppel	11288/1927	Jacked Up	Dumped
5	SEMERU	0-8-0T	Gondang Baroe 05	(Weimar Republic) Orenstein & Koppel	11806/1929	Preserved	
6	BALETOERI	0-8-0T	Gondang Baru 06	(Weimar Republic) Orenstein & Koppel	9359/1920	Previously work on Kalibagor	Preserved
7	JAYALATU	0-8-0T		(German Empire) J.A Maffei	3784/1913	Came from Kalibagor with Baletoeri, Never used	Dumped
8	RENDENG 8	0-8-0T		(Weimar Republic) Orenstein & Koppel	12262/1932	Came from Rendeng for tourist train	Dumped
??	SIMBAH	0-4-0Tr		(Netherlands) Backer & Rueb	65/1890	Came from Tasikmadu, previously named TM VIII. and using O&K Boiler (11531/1927)	Preserved
(2)	TJEPPER 2	0-4-0T		(German Empire) Orenstein & Koppel	687/1901	Ex-Ceper, Came in 2005, Never used	Preserved
(5)	TJEPPER 5	0-4-4-0T		(German Empire) Arnold Jung	2279/1914	Ex-Ceper, Came in 2005, Never used	Sold to Statfold Barn Railway
(7)	TJEPPER 7	0-6-0T		(Weimar Republic) Arnold Jung	3095/1920	Ex-Ceper, Came in 2005, Never used	Dumped

Ceper Baru
Unit Number	Nameplate	Axles(Whyte)	Image	Builder(s)	Year built	Note	status
2	TJEPPER 2	0-4-0T	Ceper 02	(German Empire) Orenstein & Koppel	687/1901		Move to Gondang Baru
4	TJEPPER 4	0-6-0T		(German Empire) Arnold Jung	818/1905		Move to Banjaratma
5	TJEPPER 5	0-4-4-0T	Ceper Baru 05	(German Empire) Arnold Jung	2279/1914		Move to Gondang Baru
6	TJEPPER 6	0-4-0T		(German Empire) J.A Maffei	3916/1914		Scrapped
7	TJEPPER 7	0-6-0T	Ceper Baru 07	(German Empire) Arnold Jung	3916/1914		Move to Gondang Baru
8	TJEPPER 8	0-4-4-0T		(Weimar Republic) Arnold Jung	3077/1919		Stored in Ceper Shed
9	TJEPPER 9	0-10-0T	Ceper Baru 09	(Weimar Republic) Maschinenfabrik L. Schwarzkopff	8842/1926		Stored in Ceper Shed
10	TJEPPER 10	0-10-0T	Ceper Baru 10	(Weimar Republic) Maschinenfabrik L. Schwarzkopff	9446/1929		Stored in Ceper Shed

Tasikmadu
Unit Number	Nameplate	Axles(Whyte)	Images	Builder(s)	Year built	Note	status
1	TM I	0-6-0T	Tasikmadu 01	(Weimar Republic) Orenstein & Koppel	9881/1921	Using Colomadu-7 Boiler	Still Active as Tourist train
2	TM II	0-8-0T		(German Empire) Henschel & Sohn	11127/1912	Wrecked in 1990s	Boiler Preserved
3	TM III	0-8-0T	Tasikmadu 03	(German Empire) Orenstein & Koppel	6389/1913		Stored
4	TM IV	0-8-0T	Tasikmadu 04	(Weimar Republic) Orenstein & Koppel	10739/1924		Preserved, minus sidetank
5	TM V	0-8-0T		(Weimar Republic) Orenstein & Koppel	9513/1921	2nd Largest in the Fleet	Stored
6	TM VI	0-10-0	Tasikmadu 06	(Weimar Republic) Orenstein & Koppel	11790/1929	Largest engine in the fleet, Nicknamed Bigboy from Java	Stored
7	TM VII	0-8-0T	Tasikmadu 07	(German Empire) Henschel & Sohn	9868/1910	This one is unique, because it have Inside frame type	Preserved
8	TM VIII	0-4-0Tr		(Netherlands) Backer & Rueb	65/1890	ex OJS-11, Sold to Tasikmadu	Sold to Gondang Baru and renamed as SIMBAH
9	TM XI	0-4-0Tr		(Netherlands) Backer & Rueb	56/1889	ex OJS-2, Sold to Tasikmadu.Nicknamed DOON	Preserved as DOON
10	TM X	0-6-0T		(Weimar Republic) Henschel & Sohn	20776/1927	Highest number Henschel in Java	Preserved
12	TM XII	0-4-2T		(German Empire) Orenstein & Koppel	4207/1910	Smallest loco in the fleet	Scrapped
13	TM XIII	0-4-0T		(Weimar Republic) Maschinenfabrik L. Schwarzkopff	8330/1931		Dumped, believed Scrapped
14	TM XIV	0-8-0T	Tasikmadu 14	(Netherlands) Du Croo & Brauns	22/1923		Stored
15	TM XV	0-4-2T	Tasikmadu 15	(German Empire) Orenstein & Koppel	6976/1913	Originally from Banjaratma	Preserved
(1)	R.M ACHMAD PARTOMO	0-8-0T		(Weimar Republic) Henschel & Sohn	19127/1925	Ex-Colomadu, Used as Pool Heater	Preserved
(3)	1908/TM 3B	0-4-2T		(German Empire) Borsig	6868/1908	Ex-Colomadu	Still Active as Tourist train
(5)	TM 5B	0-8-0T		(Weimar Republic) Orenstein & Koppel	10462/1923	Ex-Colomadu	Stored
(7)	TM 7B	0-8-0T	Tasikmadu VII B	(German Empire) Henschel & Sohn	11917/1913	Ex-Colomadu, Boiler on TM I	Stored
(1)		0-6-0T		(Belgium) Couillet	1572/1910	Ex-Jatibarang, Planned as Tourist train	Regauge failed, Scrapped Boiler still exist
??		0-6-0		(German Empire) Henschel & Sohn	5994/1901	Ex-Colomdu, Unknown identity	Preserved

Colomadu
Unit Number	Nameplate	Axles(Whyte)	Images	Builder(s)	Year built	Note	status
1	R.M. ACHMAD PARTOMO	0-8-0T	Colomadu 1	(Weimar Republic) Henschel & Sohn	19127/1925		Move to Tasikmadu
2	KS-2	0-8-0T		(Weimar Republic) Orenstein & Koppel	9274/1921	Run in 700mm, Ex-Kartasura	Boiler to Tasikmadu, chassis unknown
3		0-4-2T		(German Empire) Borsig	6868/1908		Move to Tasikmadu, currently active as tourist train.Renamed 1908/3B
4		0-8-0T		(Nazi Germany) Orenstein & Koppel	13180/1938		Move to Banjaratma
5		0-8-0T		(Weimar Republic) Orenstein & Koppel	10462/1923		Move to Tasikmadu, Renamed 5B
6	KS-6	0-8-0T		(Weimar Republic) Orenstein & Koppel	9273/1921	Run in 700mm, Ex-Kartasura	Stored in 700mm Shed
7		0-8-0T		(German Empire) Henschel & Sohn	11917/1913		Move to Tasikmadu, Renamed 7B
8		0-8-0T	Colo Madu 8	(Weimar Republic) Henschel & Sohn			Preserved
??		0-6-0		(German Empire) Henschel & Sohn	5994/1901		Move to Tasikmadu
??		0-8-0T		(Weimar Republic) Orenstein & Koppel	????/????	Run in 700mm, Ex-Kartasura	Udentified Chassis, Stored in 700mm Shed
??		0-8-0T		(Weimar Republic) Orenstein & Koppel	????/????	Run in 700mm, Ex-Kartasura	Udentified Chassis, Stored in 700mm Shed

Kalibagor
Unit Number	Nameplate	Axles(Whyte)	Images	Builder(s)	Year built	Note	status
4	NDRIYA	0-4-4-0T		(German Empire) Borsig	7083/1908		Move to Sumberharjo
5	BRAWIJAYA	0-8-0T		(Weimar Republic) J.A Maffei	3967/1920		Move to Sumberharjo
6	BALETOERI	0-8-0T		(Weimar Republic) Orenstein & Koppel	9359/1920		Move to Gondang Baru
7	JAYALATU	0-8-0T		(German Empire) J.A Maffei	3784/1913		Move to Gondang Baru

===== East Java (Ex-residentie Madiun area) =====
Purwodadi/Gorang Gareng
Unit Number	Nameplate	Axles(Whyte)	Images	Builder(s)	Year built	Note	status
1	PANDAN/ANASTASIA	0-8-0T	Purwodadi 1	(Weimar Republic) Orenstein & Koppel	9429/1930	Plinthed outside factory	Preserved
2	HARDJUNO	0-4-2T		(German Empire) Orenstein & Koppel	6936/1913		Scrapped
3	ANJASMORO/CAMELIA	0-4-2T	Purwodadi 3	(German Empire) Orenstein & Koppel	6937/1913		Scrapped
4	DIENG	0-8-0T		(German Empire) Orenstein & Koppel	6943/1913	older twin of 5	Scrapped
5 (!5)	MERAPI	0-8-0T	Purwodadi 5	(German Empire) Orenstein & Koppel	6944/1914	Renumbered as 15, currently using boiler of Rejosari 9 Last operated in 2022	Stored
6	MERBABU	0-8-0T		(German Empire) Orenstein & Koppel	6945/1914	Came here together with 4 and 5	Scrapped
7	SEMERU	0-8-0T		(German Empire) J.A Maffei	3819/1913		Scrapped
8	SLAMET/SAKERAH	0-8-0T	Purwodadi 8	(German Empire) Orenstein & Koppel	3952/1910		Scrapped
9	??	0-10-0T		(German Empire) Orenstein & Koppel	????/????	Believed to be Pagotan 8 twins	Scrapped
10	SINDHORO	0-8-0T	Purwodadi 10	(German Empire) Orenstein & Koppel	4445/1910	Last operated in 2022	Stored
11	GUNTHUR	0-8-0T	Purwodadi 11	(German Empire) Orenstein & Koppel	6039/1912	Stored without boiler	Stored
12		0-8-0T		(Weimar Republic) Orenstein & Koppel	10618/1923		Scrapped
13	TJERMEI/ALIBABA	0-8-0T		(Netherlands) Du Croo & Brauns	131/1927	Only Dutch made locomotive in the Fleet	Scrapped
14	LAWU	0-8-0T		(German Empire) Orenstein & Koppel	6897/1914		Scrapped
15	WILIS	0-8-0T	Purwodadi 15	(Weimar Republic) Orenstein & Koppel	9309/1920	Swapped identity with original 5	Stored
16	KAWI	0-8-0T	Purwodadi 16	(German Empire) Orenstein & Koppel	4359/1910	Last operated in 2022, actually doesn't have tender	Stored
17	KELUT	0-8-0T		(Weimar Republic) Orenstein & Koppel	4143/1919		Scrapped
18	BROMO	0-8-0T		(German Empire) Orenstein & Koppel	5356/1912		Scrapped

Kanigoro
Unit Number	Nameplate	Axles(Whyte)	images	Builder(s)	Year built	Note	status
1	PERGIWATI	0-6-0T	Kanigoro 1	(German Empire) Borsig	6795/1907	older sister of Kanigoro 3	Dumped
2	MUSTOKOWENI	0-8-0T	Kanigoro 2	(German Empire) Orenstein & Koppel	4264/1910		Dumped
3	PERGIWO	0-6-0T		(German Empire) Borsig	6796/1907	Only known Kanigoro locomotive to get Scrapped	Scrapped
4	DEWISINTO	0-8-0T	Kanigoro 4	(German Empire) Orenstein & Koppel	5152/1911		Dumped
5	BANOWATI	0-6-0T	Kanigoro 5	(United States) Vulcan Iron Works (Wilkes-Barre)	2926/1916	Last known unmodified/original Vulcan Locomotive still exist in Indonesia	Dumped
6	SRIKANDI/TOMAS	0-8-0T	Kanigoro 6	(Weimar Republic) Orenstein & Koppel	9447/1921	2nd Largest in the fleet, Renamed TOMAS	Dumped
7	TRIDJOTO	0-8-0T		(Weimar Republic) Orenstein & Koppel	4377/1921		Dumped
8	SUMBODRO	0-8-0T	Kanigoro 8	(German Empire) Orenstein & Koppel	3789/1910	Ex-Medarrie, largest in the fleet	Dumped
9	LARASATI	0-8-0T		(German Empire) Henschel & Sohn	11096/1912		Dumped
11	MERBABU	0-8-0T		(Weimar Republic) Orenstein & Koppel	10373/1922	Ex-Rejosari No.8 "MERBABU"	Dumped
26		0-4-4-0T	Kanigoro 26	(Netherlands) Du Croo & Brauns	77/1926	Ex-Semboro, Never used	Dumped
27		0-4-4-0T		(Netherlands) Du Croo & Brauns	82/1926	Ex-Semboro, Never used	Dumped

Rejosari
Unit Number	Nameplate	Axles(Whyte)	Images	Builder(s)	Year built	Note	status
1	CERME	0-4-2T	Rejosari 1	(German Empire) Orenstein & Koppel	898/1901	Ex-Goedo, Plinthed as No.2 "DIENG"	Preserved
2	DIENG	0-4-2T		(German Empire) Orenstein & Koppel	897/1901	Ex-Goedo	Scrapped
3	SINDORO	0-4-2T		(German Empire) Orenstein & Koppel	896/1901	Ex-Goedo	Move to Soedhono
4	LAWU	0-4-2T		(German Empire) Orenstein & Koppel	5970/1912	Swapped identity as 1, while original 1 is plinthed as 2!!	Stored
5	KELUT	0-4-2T		(German Empire) Orenstein & Koppel	895/1901	Ex-Goedo	Scrapped
6	ARJUNA	0-8-0T	Rejosarie 06	(Weimar Republic) Orenstein & Koppel	9103/1920		Still Active as 2024
7	MERAPI	0-8-0T		(Weimar Republic) Orenstein & Koppel	9275/1922		Stored, Beyond restored to working order
8	MERBABU	0-8-0T		(Weimar Republic) Orenstein & Koppel	10373/1922		Move to Kanigoro as 11
9	SEMERU	0-8-0T		(Weimar Republic) Orenstein & Koppel	10243/1923	Boiler to Purwodadi	Scrapped
10	SALAK	0-8-0T	Redjosarie 10	(German Empire) Orenstein & Koppel	8090/1916	Unique Jackshaft Locomotive	Still Active as 2024
11	GEDEH	0-10-0	Rejosari 11	(Weimar Republic) Orenstein & Koppel	11563/1928	This one had inside frame variant	Stored
12	SLAMET	0-10-0	Rejosari 12	(Weimar Republic) Henschel & Sohn	20276/1924	Only Luttermoller made by Henschel in Java	Buried behind shed, however some of her wheels still existed

Pagottan
Unit Number	Nameplate	Axles(Whyte)	Images	Builder(s)	Year built	Note	status
1		0-8-0T	Pagottan 1	(German Empire) Orenstein & Koppel	3753/1909		Dumped
2		0-8-0T	Pagottan 2	(German Empire) Orenstein & Koppel	4244/1910		Scrapped
3		0-8-0T	Pagottan 3	(Weimar Republic) Orenstein & Koppel	9430/1920		Dumped
4		0-8-0T	Pagottan 4	(Weimar Republic) Borsig	9430/1920	Twin of Merican 2	Preserved
5		0-8-0T	Pagottan 5	(Weimar Republic) Henschel & Sohn	18043/1920		Scrapped
6		0-10-0T	Pagotan 06	(Weimar Republic) Orenstein & Koppel	10606/1923	Converted to Fireless	Still Active as 2024
7		0-10-0T	Pagottan 7	(Weimar Republic) Orenstein & Koppel	11139/1925	Converted to Fireless	Still Active as 2024
8		0-10-0T	Pagotan 08	(Weimar Republic) Orenstein & Koppel	10442/1923	Converted to Fireless	Still Active as 2024

Soedhono
Unit Number	Nameplate	Axles(Whyte)	Images	Builder(s)	Year built	Note	status
1		0-8-0T		(German Empire) J.A Maffei	3645/1910	Boiler to	Scrapped
2		0-8-0T	Sudhono 2	(German Empire) J.A Maffei	3646/1910	Using one of Jung Boiler!! believed to be 8	Preserved
3		0-6-0T	Sudhono 3	(German Empire) Orenstein & Koppel	6692/1913		Preserved
4		0-8-0T		(German Empire) J.A Maffei	3647/1910		Dumped
5		0-4-0T		(German Empire) Orenstein & Koppel	514/1899	Oldest O&K in Java	Scrapped
6	SOEDHONO 6	0-8-0T		(Weimar Republic) Orenstein & Koppel	9939/1922	Boiler swapped to 7	Dumped
7		0-6-4T		(Weimar Republic) Arnold Jung	3625/1924	Using boiler of 6, Renumbered as 6	Stored
8		0-6-4T		(Weimar Republic) Arnold Jung	3626/1924	Using boiler of 2, Renumbered as 2	Stored
9		0-4-0T	Sudhono 9	(Weimar Republic) Henschel & Sohn	20047/1926		Stored
(9)		0-6-4T		(Weimar Republic) Arnold Jung	3627/1924		Scrapped
10	SINDHORO	0-4-2T		(German Empire) Orenstein & Koppel	896/1901	Cab using for ticket booth, Chassis Dumped	Preserved

Lestari
Unit Number	Nameplate	Axles(Whyte)	Images	Builder(s)	Year built	Note	status
1		0-6-0T		(United States) Vulcan Iron Works (Wilkes-Barre)	3042/1917		Move to Gempolkrep
2		0-8-0T		(German Empire) Orenstein & Koppel	6873/1913		Scrapped
3		0-8-0T		(Weimar Republic) Orenstein & Koppel	10443/1923		Move to Gempolkrep as-3L
4		0-10-0		(Weimar Republic) Orenstein & Koppel	11638/1928	Ex-Sukowidi	Move to Gempolkrep
5		0-8-0T		(Weimar Republic) Orenstein & Koppel	9360/1920		Scrapped
6		0-4-4-0T		(Weimar Republic) Borsig	10936/1921		Scrapped
7		0-4-4-0T		(Weimar Republic) Orenstein & Koppel	11542/1920		Scrapped
8		0-6-0T		(Weimar Republic) Orenstein & Koppel	9221/1920	Ex-Mojopanggung	Scrapped

===== East Java (ex-Residentie Kediri area) =====
Mojopanggong
Unit Number	Nameplate	Axles(Whyte)	Images	Builder(s)	Year built	Note	status
1	BIMASAKTI	0-8-0T	Mojopanggung 1	(German Empire) Orenstein & Koppel	2762/1907	Smallest O&K 0-8-0T to be Preserved	Preserved
2		0-8-0T	Mojopanggung 2	(Weimar Republic) Orenstein & Koppel	9349/1920	Ex-Sumobito 2	Stored
3		0-8-0T	Mojopanggung 3	(Weimar Republic) Orenstein & Koppel	10891/1924	Ex-Sumobito 3	Stored
4		0-8-0T		(German Empire) Orenstein & Koppel	5154/1911		Scrapped
5		0-8-0T		(Netherlands) Du Croo & Brauns	135/1927	Ex-Sumobito 5	Scrapped
6		0-8-0T		(Netherlands) Du Croo & Brauns	136/1927	Ex-Sumobito 6	Stored
7		0-8-0T	Mojopanggung 7	(German Empire) J.A Maffei	3783/1912		stored
8		0-8-0T	Mojopanggung 8	(United States) Baldwin Locomotive Works	44692/1916	Sole Surviving Baldwin in Indonesia	Stored
9		0-8-0T		(United States) Baldwin Locomotive Works	44822/1917	Boiler sold to Private owner	Scrapped
10		0-4-4-0T		(Weimar Republic) Orenstein & Koppel	11541/1927		Move to Gempolkrep as 10

Mrican
Unit Number	Nameplate	Axles(Whyte)	Images	Builder(s)	Year built	Note	status
1	JAWA	0-8-0T		(German Empire) Orenstein & Koppel	3349/1909	using rare Allen-Valve gear	Scrapped
2	SUMATRA	0-8-0T	Merican 2	(German Empire) Borsig	8272/1912		Preserved
3	MADURA	0-4-2T		(German Empire) Orenstein & Koppel	887/1901		Scrapped
4	SULAWESI	0-4-2T	Merican 4	(German Empire) Orenstein & Koppel	893/1901	Ex-Goedo	Scrapped
5	MALUKU	0-4-2T	Merican 5	(Weimar Republic) Orenstein & Koppel	10740/1924	Ex-Goedo	Scrapped
6	SUMBAWA	0-4-2T	Merican 6	(German Empire) Orenstein & Koppel	894/1901	Ex-Goedo	Scrapped
7	IRIAN JAYA	0-8-0T	Merican 7	(Weimar Republic) Orenstein & Koppel	11286/1926		Scrapped
8	KALIMANTAN	0-8-0T		(Weimar Republic) Orenstein & Koppel	11348/1927		Scrapped
9	HALMAHERA	0-8-0T		(Weimar Republic) Orenstein & Koppel	10433/1923		Move to Gempolkrep
10	TERNATE	0-4-4-0T		(Weimar Republic) Orenstein & Koppel	11274/1927		Move to Gempolkrep
(205)		0-4-4-0T		(Netherlands) Du Croo & Brauns	115/1927	Ex-Ngadirejo	Preserved

Pesantren
Unit Number	Nameplate	Axles(Whyte)	Images	Builder(s)	Year built	Note	status
1	WILIS	0-4-2T		(German Empire) Arnold Jung	532/1901		Preserved
2	ARDJOENO	0-6-0T		(Weimar Republic) Orenstein & Koppel	9266/1920		Scrapped
3	WELIRANG	0-6-0T		(Weimar Republic) Orenstein & Koppel	9268/1920		Scrapped
4	KLOET	0-6-0T		(Weimar Republic) Orenstein & Koppel	9267/1920		Scrapped
5	SMEROE	0-6-0T	Pesantren 5	(Weimar Republic) Orenstein & Koppel	9438/1920		Preserved
6	DOROWATIE	0-8-0T		(Weimar Republic) Orenstein & Koppel	9970/1922		Scrapped
7	PNANGGUNGAN	0-8-0T		(German Empire) Orenstein & Koppel	4492/1911		Scrapped
8	DIENG	0-8-0T	Pesantren 8	(Weimar Republic) Orenstein & Koppel	10372/1922		Preserved
9	LAWOE	0-8-0T	Pesantren 9	(German Empire) Orenstein & Koppel	5859/1912		Dumped
71		0-4-2T		(German Empire) Orenstein & Koppel	773/1901	Ex-Ngadirejo, Never used	Returned to Ngadirejo
150		0-4-4-0T	Pesantren 150	(German Empire) Orenstein & Koppel	1786/1905	Ex-Ngadirejo	Dumped
151		0-4-4-0T	Pesantren 151	(German Empire) Orenstein & Koppel	1787/1905	Ex-Ngadirejo	Dumped
182		0-4-4-0T		(German Empire) Orenstein & Koppel	6932/1913	Ex-Ngadirejo	Dumped
189		0-4-4-0T		(Weimar Republic) Orenstein & Koppel	9045/1919	Ex-Ngadirejo	Dumped
193		0-4-4-0T		(Weimar Republic) Orenstein & Koppel	9156/1920	Ex-Ngadirejo	Dumped
194		0-4-4-0T		(Weimar Republic) Orenstein & Koppel	9157/1920	Ex-Ngadirejo	Dumped
198		0-4-4-0T		(Weimar Republic) Orenstein & Koppel	11809/1928	Ex-Ngadirejo	Dumped
201		0-4-4-0T		(German Empire) Orenstein & Koppel	2339/1907	Ex-Ngadirejo	Scrapped
212		0-4-4-0T		(Netherlands) Du Croo & Brauns	152/1928	Ex-Ngadirejo	Preserved
214		0-4-4-0T	Pesantren 214	(Netherlands) Du Croo & Brauns	159/1928	Ex-Ngadirejo	Preserved in Stoomtrein Museum Katwijk, restored to working order
216	GATOTKACA	0-4-4-0T	Pesantren 216	(Netherlands) Du Croo & Brauns	161/1928	Ex-Ngadirejo	Preserved
217		0-4-4-0T	Pesantren 217	(Netherlands) Du Croo & Brauns	162/1928	Ex-Ngadirejo	Dumped
226		0-4-4-0T	Pesantren 226	(Netherlands) Du Croo & Brauns	189/1929	Ex-Ngadirejo	Dumped
228		0-4-4-0T	Pesantren 228	(Netherlands) Du Croo & Brauns	192/1929	Ex-Ngadirejo	Dumped

Ngadirejo
Unit Number	Nameplate	Axles(Whyte)	Images	Builder(s)	Year built	Note	status
57		0-8-0T		(German Empire) Orenstein & Koppel	4032/1910		Scrapped
71		0-4-2T	Ngadirejo 71	(German Empire) Orenstein & Koppel	773/1901	Send to Pesantren Baru, but they returned it	Dumped
150		0-4-4-0T		(German Empire) Orenstein & Koppel	1786/1905		Move to Pesantren Baru
151		0-4-4-0T		(German Empire) Orenstein & Koppel	1787/1905		Move to Pesantren Baru
175		0-4-4-0T		(German Empire) Orenstein & Koppel	5112/1911		Scrapped
177		0-4-4-0T		(German Empire) Orenstein & Koppel	5114/1911		Move to Pesantren Baru
182		0-4-4-0T		(German Empire) Orenstein & Koppel	6932/1913		Move to Pesantren Baru
189		0-4-4-0T		(Weimar Republic) Orenstein & Koppel	9045/1919		Move to Pesantren Baru
193		0-4-4-0T		(Weimar Republic) Orenstein & Koppel	9156/1920		Move to Pesantren Baru
194		0-4-4-0T		(Weimar Republic) Orenstein & Koppel	9157/1920		Move to Pesantren Baru
198		0-4-4-0T		(Weimar Republic) Orenstein & Koppel	11809/1928		Move to Pesantren Baru
200		0-4-4-0T		(German Empire) Orenstein & Koppel	2338/1907		Move to Gempolkrep
201		0-4-4-0T		(German Empire) Orenstein & Koppel	2339/1907		Move to Pesantren Baru
205		0-4-4-0T	Ngadirejo 205	(Netherlands) Du Croo & Brauns	152/1928		Move to Mrican
207		0-4-4-0T		(Netherlands) Du Croo & Brauns	118/1927		Scrapped
209		0-4-4-0T		(Netherlands) Du Croo & Brauns	124/1927		Move to Jombang Baru
210		0-4-4-0T	Ngadirejo 210	(Netherlands) Du Croo & Brauns	125/1927		Preserved
212		0-4-4-0T		(Netherlands) Du Croo & Brauns	159/1928		Move to Pesantren Baru
214		0-4-4-0T		(Netherlands) Du Croo & Brauns	159/1928		Move to Pesantren Baru
216		0-4-4-0T		(Netherlands) Du Croo & Brauns	161/1928		Move to Pesantren Baru
217		0-4-4-0T		(Netherlands) Du Croo & Brauns	162/1928		Moved to Pesantren Baru
224		0-4-4-0T	Ngadirejo 224	(Netherlands) Du Croo & Brauns	187/1928		Preserved
225		0-4-4-0T		(Netherlands) Du Croo & Brauns	188/1929		Move to Cukir
226		0-4-4-0T		(Netherlands) Du Croo & Brauns	189/1929		Move to Pesantren Baru
228		0-4-4-0T		(Netherlands) Du Croo & Brauns	192/1929		Move to Pesantren Baru
261		0-10-0T		(Weimar Republic) Orenstein & Koppel	9187/1920		Scrapped
263		0-10-0T		(Weimar Republic) Orenstein & Koppel	11618/1928		Scrapped

===== East Java (ex-Residentie Besuki area) =====
Semboro
Unit Number	Nameplate	Axles(Whyte)	Images	Builder(s)	Year built	Note	status
1		0-6-0T	Semboro 1	(Weimar Republic) Orenstein & Koppel	11293/1926		Preserved
2		0-6-0T		(Weimar Republic) Orenstein & Koppel	11739/1928		Stored
3		0-6-0T	Semboro 3	(Weimar Republic) Orenstein & Koppel	11927/1929		Stored
4		0-4-2T		(Weimar Republic) Orenstein & Koppel	9706/1921		Scrapped
5		0-4-2T		(Weimar Republic) Orenstein & Koppel	9705/1921		Scrapped
6		0-4-2T	Semboro 6	(Weimar Republic) Orenstein & Koppel	9704/1921		Preserved
7		0-4-2T		(Weimar Republic) Orenstein & Koppel	9703/1921		Scrapped
8		0-4-2T		(Weimar Republic) Orenstein & Koppel	9702/1921		Scrapped
9		0-4-2T		(Weimar Republic) Orenstein & Koppel	9701/1921		Scrapped
10		0-4-2T		(German Empire) Orenstein & Koppel	3319/1909		Scrapped
11		0-4-2T		(German Empire) Orenstein & Koppel	2974/1908		Preserved
12		0-4-2T		(German Empire) Orenstein & Koppel	2972/1908		Scrapped
14		0-4-2T		(German Empire) Orenstein & Koppel	2969/1908		Scrapped
15		0-4-4-0T	Semboro 15	(Weimar Republic) Orenstein & Koppel	11262/1926		Scrapped
16		0-4-4-0T		(Weimar Republic) Orenstein & Koppel	11264/1926		Scrapped
17		0-4-4-0T		(Weimar Republic) Orenstein & Koppel	11264/1926		Stored
18		0-4-4-0T		(Weimar Republic) Orenstein & Koppel	11265/1926		Stored
19		0-4-4-0T		(Weimar Republic) Orenstein & Koppel	11267/1926		Stored
20		0-4-4-0T		(Weimar Republic) Orenstein & Koppel	11268/1926		Scrapped
21		0-4-4-0T		(Weimar Republic) Orenstein & Koppel	11488/1927		Scrapped
22		0-4-4-0T		(Weimar Republic) Orenstein & Koppel	11555/1927		Stored
23		0-4-4-0T		(Netherlands) Du Croo & Brauns	73/1926		Stored
24		0-4-4-0T		(Netherlands) Du Croo & Brauns	74/1926		Stored
25		0-4-4-0T		(Netherlands) Du Croo & Brauns	75/1926		Scrapped
26		0-4-4-0T		(Netherlands) Du Croo & Brauns	77/1926		Move to Kanigoro
27		0-4-4-0T		(Netherlands) Du Croo & Brauns	82/1926		Move to Kanigoro
28		0-4-4-0T		(Netherlands) Du Croo & Brauns	101/1926		Scrapped
29		0-6-0T	Semboro 29	(West Germany) Arnold Jung	13490/1961		Stored
30		0-4-4-0T		(German Empire) Borsig	6867/1908		Scrapped
31		0-4-4-0T		(German Empire) Borsig	6993/1908		Scrapped

Jatiroto
Unit Number	Nameplate	Axles(Whyte)	Images	Builder(s)	Year built	Note	status
5J		0-4-2T		(German Empire) Orenstein & Koppel	2666/1907		Scrapped
10J		0-4-2T	Jatiroto 10J	(German Empire) Orenstein & Koppel	2967/1908		Preserved
23J		0-4-2T	Jatiroto 23J	(German Empire) Orenstein & Koppel	3317/1909		Scrapped
35J		0-4-2T		(German Empire) J.A Maffei	3542/1909		Scrapped
36J		0-4-2T		(German Empire) J.A Maffei	3543/1909		Scrapped
38J		0-4-2T		(German Empire) J.A Maffei	3545/1909		Scrapped
40J		0-4-2T		(German Empire) J.A Maffei	3547/1909		Move to Kedawung as-17
41J		0-4-2T		(German Empire) J.A Maffei	3548/1909		Scrapped
42J		0-4-2T		(German Empire) J.A Maffei	3549/1909		Scrapped
43J		0-4-2T		(German Empire) J.A Maffei	3550/1909		Scrapped
44J		0-4-2T		(German Empire) J.A Maffei	3551/1909		Scrapped
46J		0-4-2T	Jatiroto 46J	(German Empire) J.A Maffei	3660/1910		Scrapped
47J		0-4-2T	Jatiroto 47J	(German Empire) J.A Maffei	3661/1910		Preserved
48J		0-4-2T		(German Empire) J.A Maffei	3662/1910		Dumped
50J		0-4-2T		(German Empire) J.A Maffei	3668/1910		Scrapped
51J		0-4-2T		(German Empire) J.A Maffei	3669/1910		Preserved
70J		0-4-2T	Jatiroto 70J Djatiroto 70J	(German Empire) Orenstein & Koppel	772/1901	Largest 0-4-2T in the fleet	Scrapped
75J		0-4-4-0T		(Weimar Republic) Orenstein & Koppel	10486/1923		Move to Asembagus
76J		0-4-4-0T		(Weimar Republic) Orenstein & Koppel	10487/1923		Move to Asembagus
77J		0-4-4-0T		(Weimar Republic) Orenstein & Koppel	10488/1923		Scrapped
78J		0-4-4-0T		(Weimar Republic) Orenstein & Koppel	10489/1923		Scrapped
80J		0-4-4-0T		(Weimar Republic) Orenstein & Koppel	10911/1925		Move to Olean as-8
91J		0-4-4-0T		(Weimar Republic) Orenstein & Koppel	11269/1926		Move to Asembagus
92J		0-4-4-0T		(Weimar Republic) Orenstein & Koppel	11270/1927		Scrapped
97J		0-4-4-0T		(Weimar Republic) Orenstein & Koppel	11275/1927		Move to Olean as-9
98J		0-4-4-0T		(Weimar Republic) Orenstein & Koppel	11276/1927		Scrapped
99J		0-4-4-0T		(Weimar Republic) Orenstein & Koppel	11277/1926		Move to Asembagus
100J		0-6-0T	Jatiroto 100J	(West Germany) Arnold Jung	13489/1961	older sister of Semboro 29	Preserved
143J		0-4-0T		(Weimar Republic) Orenstein & Koppel	9286/1921		Dumped
230J		0-4-0T		(Weimar Republic) Orenstein & Koppel	11812/1929		Dumped

Kedawung
Unit Number	Nameplate	Axles(Whyte)	Images	Builder(s)	Year built	Note	status
11		0-6-0T		(Weimar Republic) Orenstein & Koppel	11574/1928	Stored in Warehouse	Stored
12		0-6-0T		(Weimar Republic) Orenstein & Koppel	11738/1928		Stored
13		0-8-0T		(Weimar Republic) Orenstein & Koppel	9357/1920		Stored
14		0-8-0T	Kedawung 14	(German Empire) Orenstein & Koppel	6946/1913	Restored to working order, can be chartered	Stored
15		0-8-0T		(German Empire) Orenstein & Koppel	6947/1913		Preserved/unrestored
16		0-8-0T	Kedawung 16	(German Empire) Orenstein & Koppel	293/1912	Ex Bangka Belinju Tin mines, Sole survivor	Preserved/unrestored
17		0-4-2T	Kedawung 17	(German Empire) J.A Maffei	3547/1909	Ex Kedawung 40J	Preserved/unrestored

Pajarakan
Unit Number	Nameplate	Axles(Whyte)	Images	Builder(s)	Year built	Note	status
1	ARJUNO	0-8-0T		(German Empire) Orenstein & Koppel	5856/1912		Move to Olean
2	KELUT	0-4-2T	Pajarakan 2	(German Empire) Orenstein & Koppel	777/1901		Dumped
3	MERAPI	0-8-0T		(German Empire) Orenstein & Koppel	5438/1912		Move to Asembagus
4	SEMERU	0-8-0T		(German Empire) Orenstein & Koppel	5440/1912		Move to Olean
5	BROMO	0-8-0T		(Weimar Republic) Orenstein & Koppel	9358/1920		Move to Olean
6	KAWI	0-4-2T		(German Empire) Orenstein & Koppel	888/1901		Dumped
7	HIYANG	0-8-0T		(German Empire) Orenstein & Koppel	4300/1910		Move to Olean
8	SLAMET	0-8-0T		(German Empire) Orenstein & Koppel	4868/1911		Move to Asembagus

Wonolangan
Unit Number	Nameplate	Axles(Whyte)	Images	Builder(s)	Year built	Note	status
1		0-8-0T		(German Empire) Orenstein & Koppel	4989/1911		Unknown
2		0-8-0T	Wonolangan 2	(German Empire) Orenstein & Koppel	4990/1911		Stored
3		0-8-0T	Wonolangan 3	(Weimar Republic) Orenstein & Koppel	9310/1920		Stored
4		0-8-0T		(Weimar Republic) Orenstein & Koppel	9305/1920	Ex-De Maas-8	Stored
5 (2)		0-8-0T		(German Empire) Orenstein & Koppel	7965/1915	Renumbered as 2	Stored
6		0-6-0T	Wonolangan 6	(Netherlands) Backer & Rueb	10458/1923		Dumped
7		0-4-4-0T	Wonolangan 7	(German Empire) Orenstein & Koppel	2098/1906	One of only two inside frame mallet in Indonesia	Preserved

Gending
Unit Number	Nameplate	Axles(Whyte)	Images	Builder(s)	Year built	Note	status
1		0-8-0T		(German Empire) Arnold Jung	1756/1912		Scrapped
2		0-8-0T		(German Empire) Orenstein & Koppel	4493/1911		Scrapped
3		0-6-0T	Wonolangan 3	(Weimar Republic) Orenstein & Koppel	9391/1920		Scrapped
4		0-4-4-0T		(German Empire) Orenstein & Koppel	3902/1910	One of only two inside frame mallet in Indonesia	Preserved in Germany

Olean
Unit Number	Nameplate	Axles(Whyte)	Images	Builder(s)	Year built	Note	status
1	DODO	0-4-2T	Olean 1	(German Empire) Orenstein & Koppel			Moved to De Maas
2		0-8-0T	Olean 2	(German Empire) Orenstein & Koppel	4869/1911		Stored
3 (2)		0-8-0T		(German Empire) Orenstein & Koppel	4360/1910		Scrapped
5		0-10-0T		(Weimar Republic) Maschinenfabrik L. Schwarzkopff	9596/1929	Ex Paiton, Largest Locomotive in the fleet	Scrapped
6		0-8-0T		(Weimar Republic) J.A Maffei	4246/1921		Scrapped
7		0-8-0T	Olean 7	(Weimar Republic) J.A Maffei	4247/1921		Scrapped
8		0-4-4-0T		(Weimar Republic) Orenstein & Koppel	10911/1925		Scrapped
9		0-4-4-0T		(Weimar Republic) Orenstein & Koppel	11275/1927		Scrapped
10		0-8-0T		(German Empire) Orenstein & Koppel	4361/1910		Move to Prajekan
(1)	ARJUNO	0-8-0T		(German Empire) Orenstein & Koppel	5856/1912		Preserved/Dumped
(4)	SEMERU	0-8-0T	Olean 04	(German Empire) Orenstein & Koppel	5440/1912	Restored to working order, can be chartered	Stored
(5)	BROMO	0-8-0T	Olean 05	(Weimar Republic) Orenstein & Koppel	9358/1920		Stored
(7)	HIYANG	0-8-0T		(German Empire) Orenstein & Koppel	4300/1910		Stored

Wringinanom
Unit Number	Nameplate	Axles(Whyte)	Images	Builder(s)	Year built	Note	status
2	WARINGIN ANOM II	0-8-0T	Wringinanom 02	(Weimar Republic) Orenstein & Koppel	10738/1924		Preserved
3	WARINGIN ANOM III	0-8-0T		(German Empire) Orenstein & Koppel	6568/1913	Chassis converted to bench	Scrapped
4	WARINGIN ANOM IV	0-8-0T		(German Empire) Orenstein & Koppel	6569/1913		Scrapped
5	WARINGIN ANOM V	0-8-0T		(German Empire) Orenstein & Koppel	6706/1913		Scrapped
6	WARINGIN ANOM VI	0-8-0T	Wringinanom 06	(German Empire) Orenstein & Koppel	4870/1911	Repainted to Mickey Mouse in 1990s, Using DuCroo & Brauns Boiler	Stored
7		0-8-0T	Wringinanom 07	(Netherlands) Du Croo & Brauns	129/27		Stored
8		0-8-0T		(Netherlands) Du Croo & Brauns	28/1924		Scrapped
9		0-6-0T		(German Empire) Arnold Jung	542/1902		Scrapped

Prajekan
Unit Number	Nameplate	Axles(Whyte)	Images	Builder(s)	Year built	Note	status
1	HANS/KATJUNG	0-8-0		(German Empire) Orenstein & Koppel	7374/1916		Move to De Maas
2	TJORNEK/VAARTWELT	0-8-0T		(German Empire) Orenstein & Koppel	5245/1912		Stored
3	BUTTONG	0-8-0T	Pradjekan 03	(Weimar Republic) Orenstein & Koppel	9382/1920		Move to Asembagus as-10
4	UITKOMST/SABBAR	0-8-0T		(Weimar Republic) Orenstein & Koppel	11287/1926		Move to Asembagus
5	NONNI	0-8-0T		(Weimar Republic) Orenstein & Koppel	9412/1920		Move to Asembagus as-5
6	P.SAKERA/BERAT			(Weimar Republic) Orenstein & Koppel	10434/1923	Largest O&K Luttermoller in Java	Stored
7	HERCULES		Prajekan 07	(Weimar Republic) Orenstein & Koppel	11395/1927	Largest O&K Luttermoller in Java	Stored
8	GOLIATH			(Weimar Republic) Orenstein & Koppel	10807/1923	Largest O&K Luttermoller in Java	Stored
9	GANDRUNG	0-8-0T		(Weimar Republic) Orenstein & Koppel	10477/1923		Stored
10		0-8-0T	Prajekan 10	(German Empire) Orenstein & Koppel	4361/1910	Ex-Olean	Unknown

Asembagus
Unit Number	Nameplate	Axles(Whyte)	Images	Builder(s)	Year built	Note	status
1	SRITI	0-4-2T		(German Empire) Arnold Jung	529/1907		Scrapped
3		0-8-0T		(German Empire) J.A Maffei	3663/1910		Scrapped
4(9)	ELANG	0-8-0T		(German Empire) J.A Maffei	3664/1910		Scrapped
4	MERPATI	0-4-4-0T		(German Empire) Orenstein & Koppel	4991/1911		Scrapped
5		0-8-0T	Asembagus 5	(Weimar Republic) Orenstein & Koppel	10476/1923		Scrapped
7		0-8-0T		(German Empire) Orenstein & Koppel	4370/1910		Scrapped
8		0-4-4-0T	Asembagus 8	(German Empire) Orenstein & Koppel	5153/1911		Scrapped
(3/10)	BUTTONG	0-8-0T		(Weimar Republic) Orenstein & Koppel	9382/1920	Ex-Prajekan, renumbered as 10	Boiler to No.5 Prajekan/chassis Scrapped
(4)	UITKOMST/SABBAR	0-8-0T		(Weimar Republic) Orenstein & Koppel	11287/1926	Ex-Prajekan, Never used	Scrapped
(5/10)	NONNI	0-8-0T		(Weimar Republic) Orenstein & Koppel	9412/1920	Ex-Prajekan, renumbered as 10, using Prajekan 3 boiler	Stored
(3/11)		0-6-0T	Asembagus 11	(Weimar Republic) Orenstein & Koppel	9459/1920	Ex-De Maas, renumbered as 11	Stored
(3)	MERAPI	0-8-0T	Asembagus 15 III	(German Empire) Orenstein & Koppel	5438/1912	Ex-Pajarakan, Never used	Scrapped
(8)	SLAMET	0-8-0T		(Weimar Republic) Orenstein & Koppel	9358/1920	Ex-Pajarakan, Never used	Scrapped
99J (17)		0-4-4-0T	Asembagus 17	(Weimar Republic) Orenstein & Koppel	11277/1926	Ex-Jatiroto, renumbered as 17	Scrapped
75J		0-4-4-0T		(Weimar Republic) Orenstein & Koppel	10486/1923	Ex-Jatiroto, Never used	Scrapped
76J		0-4-4-0T		(Weimar Republic) Orenstein & Koppel	10487/1923	Ex-Jatiroto, Never used	Scrapped
91J		0-4-4-0T		(Weimar Republic) Orenstein & Koppel	11269/1926	Ex-Jatiroto, Never used	Scrapped

De Maas
Unit Number	Nameplate	Axles(Whyte)	Images	Builder(s)	Year built	Note	status
1	DODO	0-4-2T	De Maas 1	(German Empire) Orenstein & Koppel	3467/1909	Ex-Olean 1	Preserved
2		0-8-0T		(Weimar Republic) J.A Maffei	4249/1921		Scrapped
3(2)		0-6-0T	De Maas 3	(Weimar Republic) Orenstein & Koppel	9459/1920	Renumbered as 2	Move to Asembagus as 11
4		0-4-2T	De Maas 4	(German Empire) Orenstein & Koppel	2966/1908		Stored
5		0-4-0		(Weimar Republic) J.A Maffei	4007/1920		Stored
8		0-4-2T		(German Empire) Orenstein & Koppel	2970/1908		Scrapped
(1)	HANS/KATJUNG	0-8-0		(German Empire) Orenstein & Koppel	7374/1916	Ex-Prajekan	Scrapped

Panji
Unit Number	Nameplate	Axles(Whyte)	Images	Builder(s)	Year built	Note	status
1	ARTJA	0-6-0T		(Weimar Republic) Orenstein & Koppel	11156/1925		Scrapped
2	BANON	0-6-0T	Panji 2	(Weimar Republic) Orenstein & Koppel	11155/1925		Scrapped
3	LANDANGAN	0-6-0T	Panji 3	(Weimar Republic) Orenstein & Koppel	11157/1925		Scrapped
4	TENGGIR	0-6-0T		(Weimar Republic) Orenstein & Koppel	11158/1925		Scrapped
5	KAMAL	0-4-0T		(Weimar Republic) Arnold Jung	3631/1924		Scrapped
6	NGELOM	0-6-0T		(German Empire) Orenstein & Koppel	4909/1911		Scrapped
7	BRANTAS	0-6-0T	Pandji 7	(Weimar Republic) Orenstein & Koppel	10928/1925		Scrapped
10		0-6-0T		(German Empire) Orenstein & Koppel	697/1903		Preserved
18			Panji 18	(Weimar Republic) Arnold Jung			Preserved

===== East Java (ex-Residentie Surabaya area) =====
Cukir
Unit Number	Nameplate	Axles(Whyte)	Images	Builder(s)	Year built	Note	status
1		4w+4wT		(Weimar Republic) Maschinenfabrik L. Schwarzkopff	8458/1925		Scrapped
2	EPPO	4w+4wT		(Weimar Republic) Maschinenfabrik L. Schwarzkopff	8782/1926		Scrapped
3	ATLAS	0-8-0		(German Empire) Orenstein & Koppel	6023/1912	Twin of Prajekan-1 & Jombang-4	Scrapped
4	LOES	0-8-0		(Weimar Republic) Orenstein & Koppel	11770/1928		Scrapped
5		0-8-0T		(Weimar Republic) Orenstein & Koppel	9306/1920		Scrapped
6	NAKULO	0-4-4-0T		(German Empire) Orenstein & Koppel	2134/1906	Ex-Ketanen	Scrapped
7	SADEWO	0-4-4-0T		(German Empire) Orenstein & Koppel	3324/1909	Ex-Ketanen	Scrapped
177		0-4-4-0T		(German Empire) Orenstein & Koppel	5114/1911	Ex-Ngadirejo	Scrapped
225		0-4-4-0T		(Netherlands) Du Croo & Brauns	188/1929	Ex-Ngadirejo	Scrapped
?	THEO	0-8-0		(German Empire) Orenstein & Koppel	????/????	Scrapped long time ago, believed to be original 5	Scrapped

Jombang Baru
Unit Number	Nameplate	Axles(Whyte)	Images	Builder(s)	Year built	Note	status
2	NO-2	0-4-2T		(German Empire) Orenstein & Koppel	706/1900		Scrapped
3	NO-3	0-8-0		(German Empire) Orenstein & Koppel	2729/1908		Scrapped
4	NO-4	0-8-0		(German Empire) Orenstein & Koppel	5138/1911		Scrapped
5	NO-5	0-8-0T		(German Empire) Orenstein & Koppel	4800/1911		Scrapped
209		0-4-4-0T		(Netherlands) Du Croo & Brauns	124/1927	Ex-Ngadirejo	Scrapped
219		0-4-4-0T		(Netherlands) Du Croo & Brauns	166/1928	Ex-Ngadirejo	Scrapped

Gempolkrep
Unit Number	Nameplate	Axles(Whyte)	Images	Builder(s)	Year built	Note	status
2		0-8-0T	Gempolkrep 02	(Weimar Republic) Orenstein & Koppel	9308/1920		Stored
3		0-6-0T		(United States) Vulcan Iron Works (Wilkes-Barre)	2696/1917	This one using Cab from O&K	Stored
4		0-8-0T	Gempolkrep 04	(Netherlands) Du Croo & Brauns	53/1925	Ex-Sentanen Lor, The sole survivor	Stored
5		0-8-0T		(Weimar Republic) Orenstein & Koppel	9452/1921	Gone by 1978, however her frame could still be seen in 1984	Scrapped
6		0-8-0T		(Weimar Republic) Orenstein & Koppel	???/????	Gone by 1978, however her frame could still be seen in 1984	Scrapped
10		0-8-0T		(German Empire) Orenstein & Koppel	4863/1911		
11		0-8-0T	Gempolkrep 11	(German Empire) Orenstein & Koppel	7878/1914		Stored
12		0-10-0	Gempolkrep 12	(Weimar Republic) Orenstein & Koppel	10607/1923	Ex-Ketanen, Pistons valve are damaged making a whistling sound	Stored
14		0-8-0T	Gempolkrep 14	(German Empire) Orenstein & Koppel	5217/1912	Ex-Brangkal	Preserved
15		0-8-0T	Gempolkrep 015	(German Empire) Orenstein & Koppel	4863/1911		Stored
18		0-8-0T	Gempolkrep 18	(Weimar Republic) Orenstein & Koppel	9346/1920	Using motion from many different engine	Stored
19		0-8-0T	Gempolkrep 19	(Weimar Republic) Orenstein & Koppel	9458/1920		Stored
(1)		0-6-0T	Gempolkrep 01	(United States) Vulcan Iron Works (Wilkes-Barre)	3042/1917	Ex-Lestari, Never used	Stored
3L		0-8-0T	Gempolkrep 03L	(Weimar Republic) Orenstein & Koppel	10443/1923	Ex-Lestari	Stored
(4)		0-10-0	Gempolkrep IV	(Weimar Republic) Orenstein & Koppel	11638/1928	Ex-Lestari	Stored
(5)		0-4-4-0T		(Weimar Republic) Orenstein & Koppel	11541/1927	Ex-Mojopanggung 5, Renumbered as-10	Stored
(9)	HALMAHERA	0-8-0T		(Weimar Republic) Orenstein & Koppel	10433/1923	Ex-Mrican	Scrapped
(10)	TERNATE	0-4-4-0T		(Weimar Republic) Orenstein & Koppel	11274/1927	Ex-Mrican	Scrapped
198		0-4-4-0T		(Weimar Republic) Orenstein & Koppel	11809/1928	Ex-Pesantren baru, Previously from Ngadirejo, Never used	Scrapped
200		0-4-4-0T		(German Empire) Orenstein & Koppel	2338/1907	Ex-Ngadirejo	Scrapped

Tulangan
Unit Number	Nameplate	Axles(Whyte)	Images	Builder(s)	Year built	Note	status
1	TUMAPEL	0-4-0T		(Weimar Republic) J.A Maffei	4093/1920		Scrapped
2	MOJOPAHIT	0-4-0T		(Weimar Republic) Orenstein & Koppel	12246/1933		Scrapped
5	SRIWIJAYA	0-4-0T		(Weimar Republic) Orenstein & Koppel	12203/1930		Scrapped
6	NGNEMPLAK	0-4-2T		(German Empire) Arnold Jung	2399/1916	Seen out of use in 1979	Scrapped

Krian
Unit Number	Nameplate	Axles(Whyte)	Images	Builder(s)	Year built	Note	status
1		0-4-0T		(Weimar Republic) Henschel & Sohn	17514/1920		Scrapped
2		0-4-0T		(Weimar Republic) Henschel & Sohn	20041/1923		Scrapped

Rejoagung
Unit Number	Nameplate	Axles(Whyte)	Images	Builder(s)	Year built	Note	status
5		0-4-4-0T		(German Empire) Orenstein & Koppel	3768/1910	Ex-Ponen	Scrapped
6		0-4-4-0T	Rejoagung 6	(German Empire) Orenstein & Koppel	6008/1912		Move to Candi
7		0-4-4-0T		(German Empire) Orenstein & Koppel	6994/1913		Scrapped
8		0-6-0T	Rejoagung 8	(United States) Vulcan Iron Works (Wilkes-Barre)	3092/1917	Tender still can be seen at Rejoagung roundhouse	Move to Candi
9		0-8-0T		(Weimar Republic) Orenstein & Koppel	9885/1921		Scrapped
10	MERAPI	0-8-0T		(Weimar Republic) Hanomag	10353/1924		Scrapped
11		0-8-0T		(Weimar Republic) Henschel & Sohn	18456/1921	Twin of Krebet-1	Scrapped
12	WILIS	0-8-0T		(Weimar Republic) Hanomag	10408/1925		Scrapped
13	LAWOE	0-8-0T		(Weimar Republic) Hanomag	10409/1925	Sold to Germany using MERAPI nameplate	Preserved in Germany
14	PANDAN	0-8-0T		(Weimar Republic) Orenstein & Koppel	11306/1927		Scrapped
15	SARANGAN	0-8-0T		(Weimar Republic) Orenstein & Koppel	11307/1927		Scrapped
17	PLAOSAN	0-8-0T		(Weimar Republic) Orenstein & Koppel	11540/1927		Scrapped
18		0-8-0T		(Weimar Republic) Orenstein & Koppel	11775/1928		Scrapped
19		0-8-0T		(Weimar Republic) Orenstein & Koppel	11776/1928		Scrapped
20	LINA	0-4-4-0T		(German Empire) Orenstein & Koppel	3769/1910		Scrapped
21	FRANCOISE	0-8-0T		(Weimar Republic) Orenstein & Koppel	9272/1921		Scrapped
22		0-4-2T		(German Empire) Orenstein & Koppel	825/1902		Scrapped
23	PONEN II	0-4-4-0T		(German Empire) Orenstein & Koppel	4494/1910		Preserved
24	FRANKY	0-4-4-0T		(German Empire) Orenstein & Koppel	3291/1908		Scrapped
25	ALLEN	0-4-4-0T		(German Empire) Orenstein & Koppel	3335/1910		Scrapped
?				(United States) Dickson	???/???		Scrapped
?				(United States) Dickson	???/???		Scrapped
?				(United States) Dickson	???/???		Scrapped

Track gauge 762 mm (2 ft 6 in)

- Pakis Baru No. 1, build by Orenstein & Koppel
- Pakis Baru No. 5, build by Orenstein & Koppel

Track gauge 750 mm (2 ft 5 1/2 in)

- Banjaratma No. 10
- Ceper Baru No. 5
- Colomadu No. 1
- Pakis Baru No. 2
- Pakis Baru No. 3, build by Orenstein & Koppel
- Pakis Baru No. 4, build by Orenstein & Koppel
- Pakis Baru No. 6, build by Hanomag
- Pakis Baru No. 7, build by Hanomag
- Tasikmadu No. 3 1908, build by Borsig
- Tasikmadu No. 5
- Tasikmadu TM I, build by Orenstein & Koppel
- Tasikmadu TM V
- Tasikmadu TM IV
- Tasikmadu TM VI, build by Orenstein & Koppel
- Tasikmadu TM IX (Lokomotiv Doon)
- Tasikmadu TM X
- Tasikmadu TM XIV
- Trangkil No. 1, build by Du Croo & Brauns
- Trangkil No. 3, build by Berliner Maschinenbau
- Trangkil No. 4, build by Hunslet Engine Company

Track gauge 720 mm

- Sindanglaut No. 4
- Sindanglaut No. 7
- Sindanglaut No. 8
- Sindanglaut No. 10
- Sindanglaut No. 11
- Sindanglaut No. 13

Track gauge 700 mm (2 ft 3 9/16 in)

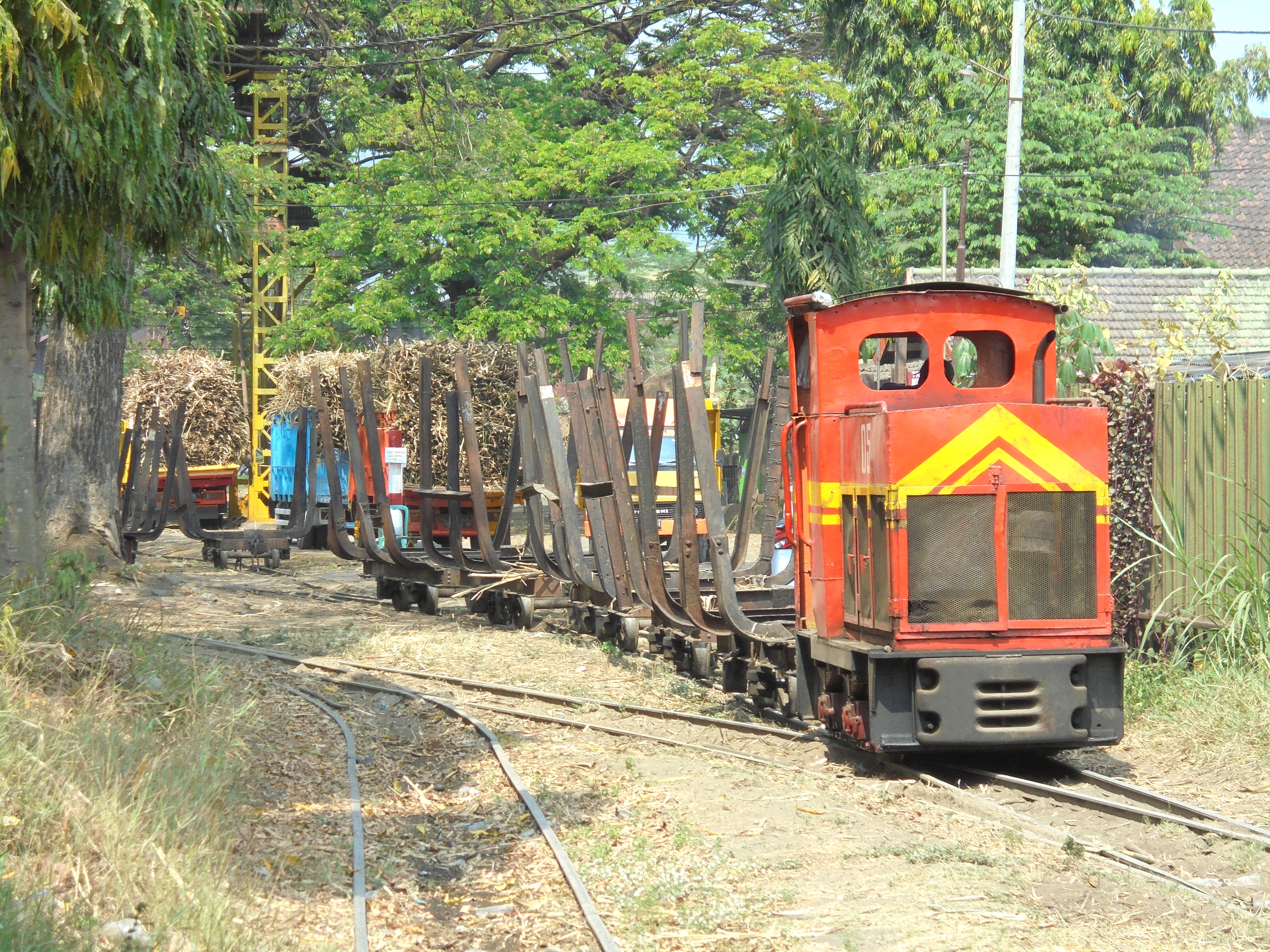
Sugar cane railway at Rejosari Sugar Mill

- Bromo No. 5 (owned by PG Olean)
- Gempol No. 2
- Gempol No. 12, build by Henschel & Son
- Gempolkrep No. 4, build by Orenstein & Koppel
- Gempolkrep No. 12, build by Orenstein & Koppel
- Gondang Winangun No. 14
- Jatiroto No. 100, build by Arnold Jung Lokomotivfabrik
- Kalibagor No. 20
- Kartasura No. 5
- Kebonagung No. 2, build by Orenstein & Koppel
- Kebonagung No. 4, build by Henschel & Son
- Kebonagung No. 7, build by Orenstein & Koppel
- Kebonagung No. 8, build by Hanomag
- Kebonagung No. 9, build by Orenstein & Koppel
- Kebonagung No. 10, build by Orenstein & Koppel
- Kedawung No. 14
- Kedawung No. 16, build by Machinefabriek Breda
- Ketanggungan No. 11
- Krebet No. 3, build by Orenstein & Koppel
- Krebet No. 10, build by Hanomag
- Krebet No. 11, build by Hanomag
- Meritjan No. 205, build by Du Croo & Brauns
- Ngadirejo No. 224, build by Du Croo & Brauns
- Olean No. 1
- Olean No. 7
- Pagottan No. 7
- Pesantren Baru No. 214, build by Du Croo & Brauns
- Pesantren Baru No. 216, build by Du Croo & Brauns
- Pesantren Baru No. 228, build by Du Croo & Brauns
- Purwodadi No. 1
- Purwodadi No. 10
- Rejosari No. 2, build by Orenstein & Koppel
- Rejosari No. 6 build by Orenstein & Koppel
- Rejosari No. 10
- Rendeng No. 6
- Semboro No. 14
- Semboro No. 15
- Semboro No. 29, build by Arnold Jung Lokomotivfabrik
- Semeru No. 4 (owned by PG Olean)
- Sragi No. 16
- Sumberharjo No. 3, build by Orenstein & Koppel
- Sumberharjo No. 4, build by Orenstein & Koppel
- Sumberharjo No. 5, build by American Locomotive Company
- Sumberharjo No. 9, build by Du Croo & Brauns
- Sumberharjo No. 10, build by Du Croo & Brauns
- Sumberharjo No. 15
- Tersana Baru No. 2
- Tersana Baru No. 6
- Wonolangan No. 7, build by Orenstein & Koppel
- Wringinanom No. 06

Track gauge 660 mm (2 ft 2 in)

- Kadhipaten No. 2

Track gauge 610 mm (2 ft)

- Jatibarang 9, build by Arnold Jung Lokomotivfabrik
- Sragi No.1, build by Krauss
- Sragi No. 14 Max, build by Orenstein & Koppel

Track gauge 600 mm (1 ft 11 5/8 in)

- Cepiring No. 6
- Gending No. 4 build by Orenstein & Koppel
- Gending No. 8
- Jatibarang No. 9
- Jatibarang No 10
- Jatiwangi No. 5
- Pangka No. 1, build by Arnold Jung Lokomotivfabrik
- Pangka No. 3, build by Arnold Jung Lokomotivfabrik
- Pangka No. 10, build by Orenstein & Koppel
- Panji No. 15
- Rejoagung No. 13
- Soedhono No. 10
- Tulangan No. 5

=== Fireless steam locomotive ===
Track gauge 700 mm (2 ft 3 9/16 in)

- Pagottan No. 7, build by Orenstein & Koppel
- Pagottan No. 8, build by Orenstein & Koppel
- Semboro No. 2
- Semboro No. 3

== Diesel locomotives ==
A diesel locomotive is a rail vehicle that uses the power of diesel to propel a whole series of trains.

=== Railway Company ===
Standard Gauge

Diesel–electric
Class	Road no.	Image	Axles	Builder	Power (hp)	Engine	Entered service	Initial use
CC207 (DF4D)	23 01		Co-Co	(China) CRRC Dalian	3940	16V240ZJ*	2023	mainline, backup (KCIC)

=== Industrial diesel locomotives ===
Track gauge 1,435 mm (4 ft 8 1/2 in)

- GK0C, build by CRRC Yangtze (owned by Krakatau Steel)

=== Plantations diesel locomotives ===
Track gauge 750 mm (2 ft 5 1/2 in)

- Tasikmadu No. 21
- Tasikmadu No. 25

Track gauge 720 mm

- Sindanglaut No. 19

Track gauge 700 mm (2 ft 3 9/16 in)

- Kedawung No. 9, build by Schöma
- Madu Kismo No. 10
- PT. Antam Cikotok, build by Deutz-Fahr
- PT. Bakrie Sumatra Plantations (unknown fleet number), build by Hokuriku & Schöma
- PT. BSP (unknown number fleet), build by Hokuriku & Schöma
- PT. Socfindo (unknown number fleet), build by Hokuriku & Schöma
- PTPN II (unknown fleet number), build by Hokuriku & Schöma
- PTPN IV (unknown fleet number), build by Hokuriku & Schöma

Track gauge 670 mm

- Kadipaten No. 19

Track gauge 600 mm (1 ft 11 5/8 in)

- Pangkah No. 13
- Pangkah No. 15

== Electric locomotives ==
=== Railway Company ===
Standard Gauge

System: 25 kV AC overhead

Class	Internal name	Image	Sets built	In service	Cars per Set	Manufacturer	Power (kW)	Traction system	Remarks
CR400AF	KCIC 400AF		11	88	8	(China) CRRC Qingdao Sifang (2022)	9600(4M4T)	VVVF-IGBT	Operated by KCIC (2nd tier subsidiary of KAI) for Whoosh, 25 kV AC overhead, 2023–present. Also derived as inspection train (1 trainset).

=== Hybrid locomotive ===
Track gauge 1,435 mm (4 ft 8 1/2 in)

- MMT-M-270-BDE, build by Schalker Eisenhutte Maschinenfabrik (owned by Freeport Indonesia for underground mining operations)

== See also ==
- Jakarta Monorail
- Transport in Indonesia
- List of named passenger trains of Indonesia
- List of railway stations in Indonesia
- List of railway companies in the Dutch East Indies
- Rail transport in Indonesia
- List of railway accidents and incidents in Indonesia
- List of defunct railway in Indonesia
- List of Kereta Api Indonesia rolling stock classes
- Trams in Surabaya
- Indonesian railway rolling stock numbering system and classification
