= Schöma =

German locomotive manufacturer

SCHÖMA Christoph Schöttler Maschinenfabrik GmbH

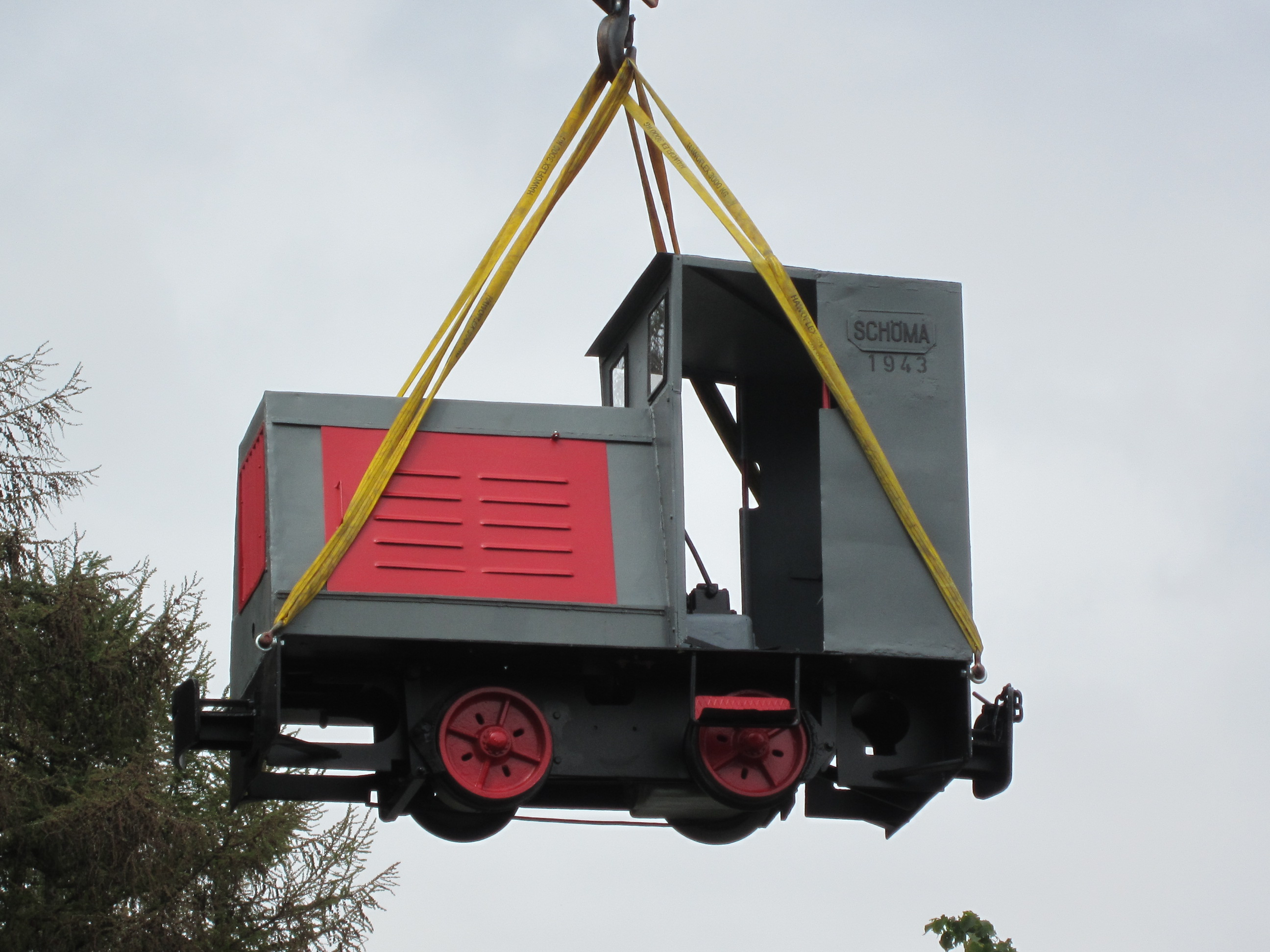
- SCHÖMA field railway locomotive on the way to its museum stand in Lohne (Oldenburg)
- Trade name: Schöma
- Founder: Christoph Schöttler

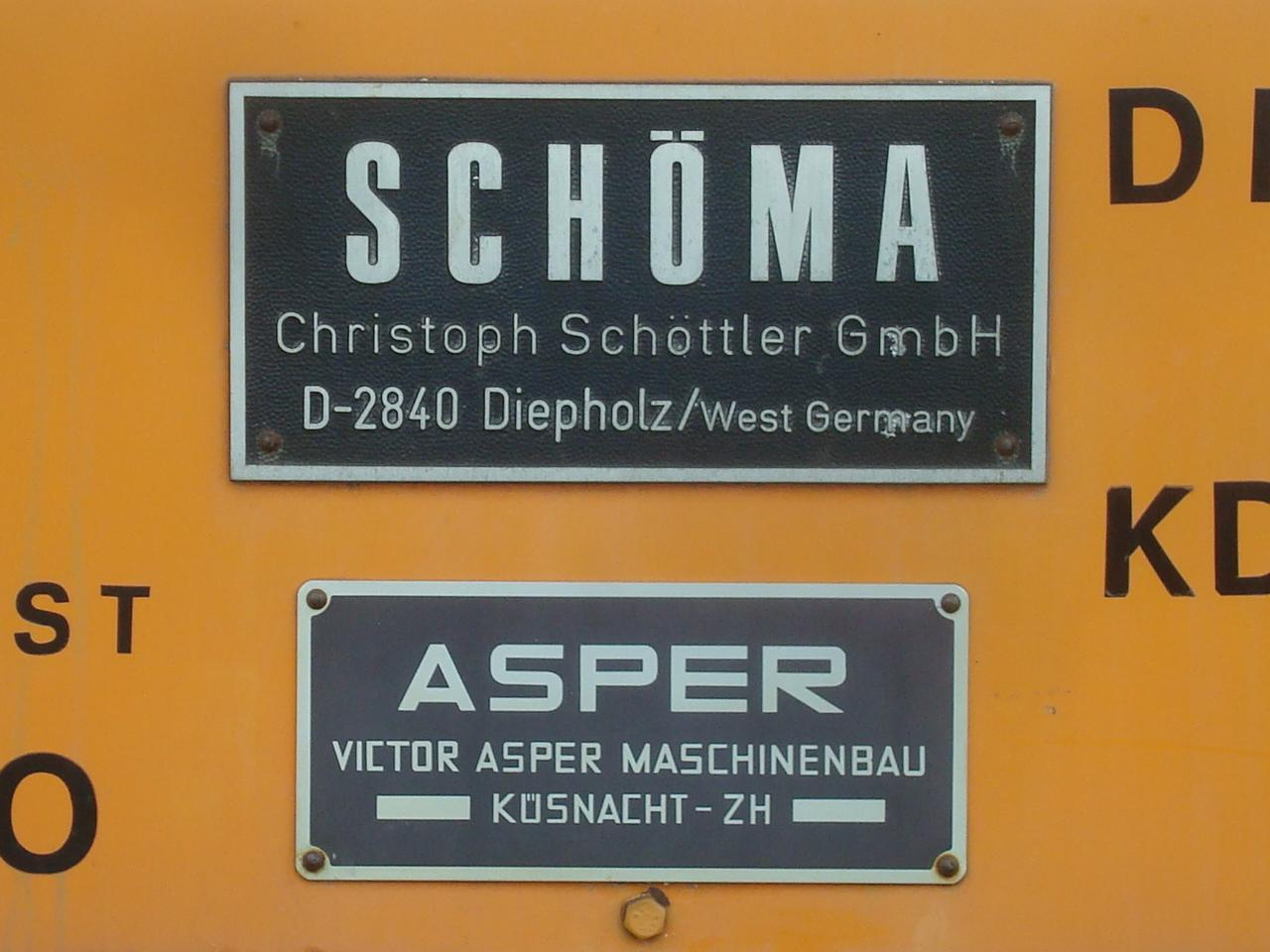
Schöma and Asper builders plates on the switcher Tm 237 906-3 of the Pesa Company (2010)

Schöma is a company based in Diepholz, Germany, specialising in the construction of small diesel locomotives.

After Christoph Schöttler left his father's business, the Diepholzer Maschinenfabrik Fritz Schöttler (DIEMA), because of disagreements about the product range, in 1930 he founded his own machine factory, the Christoph Schöttler Maschinenfabrik GmbH, on the former premises of DIEMA. The company was first called SCHÖMAG for short, which was changed a few years later to Schöma. In the early years, Schöttler continued the production of mill machines and tractors, but soon started building rail vehicles.

Schöma soon became one of the most important manufacturers of field railways, mine railways, narrow-gauge diesel locomotives, and railway service vehicles. They also developed their own engines and transmissions, as well as a drive shaft for diesel locomotives. At the beginning of the 1960s, Schöma developed, in cooperation with the German Federal Railways, the heavy-duty Klv 53, and in the 1970s manufactured the Klv 54 vehicles.

In 1970, the construction of tunnel locomotives began; today they make up the majority of the locomotives produced by the company. They are used for the construction of subways, traffic tunnels, or supply tunnels. In addition to the tunnel locomotives, Schöma also manufactures shunting locomotives and locomotives for island railways in normal and narrow gauge. On the day of the 75th anniversary of the company, the 6000th locomotive was delivered. Many locomotives are one-offs. The company also handles the conversion of used locomotives.

Since May 19, 2011 a Schöma-Feldbahn locomotive, built in 1943 with an attached peat car, has sat in the middle of a roundabout on the highway between Vechta and Damme in Lohne (Oldenburg) - about seven kilometers away from Diepholz - where for decades peat was transported from the Südlohner Moor on the foothills of the Dammer mountains.

As of 2012, the fourth generation of the Schöttler family took over control of the company.

== Examples ==
Tunnels where Schöma locomotives have been used:
- Gotthard Base Tunnel
- Eurotunnel
- Tunneling in Shanghai
- London Underground
- Tunneling in Madrid
Places where Schöma shunting locomotives are used:
- Sungshin Cement Plant, South Korea
- Weiacher Gravel Pit
- Matterhorn Gotthard Bahn
- Rhaetian Railway
- Regionalverkehr Bern-Solothurn
- Freiburger Verkehrs AG
- Delmenhorst-Harpstedter Eisenbahn
Museum and island railways with Schöma locomotives:
- Langeoog
- Borkum
- Spiekeroog
- Wangerooge
- Baltrum
- Berlin Park railway
- Chemnitz Park railway
- Bad Schwalbacher Kurbahn
- Pelion railway

== Sources ==
- Andreas Christopher, Ulrich Völz: Die Feldbahn, Band 7: 75 Jahre SCHÖMA, Ingrid Zeunert, Gifhorn 2005, ISBN 3-924335-42-7 (Christoph Schöttler Maschinenfabrik 1930–2005)
- Dieter Holtbrügger:" Qualität made in Diepholz." In: eisenbahn-magazin 12/2012, S. 38f.
- Georg Thomas: "Gefragte Loks". In: Niedersächsische Wirtschaft 02/2014 S. 28
