= Maschinenfabrik Christian Hagans =

Coordinates: 51.008°N 11.0206°E

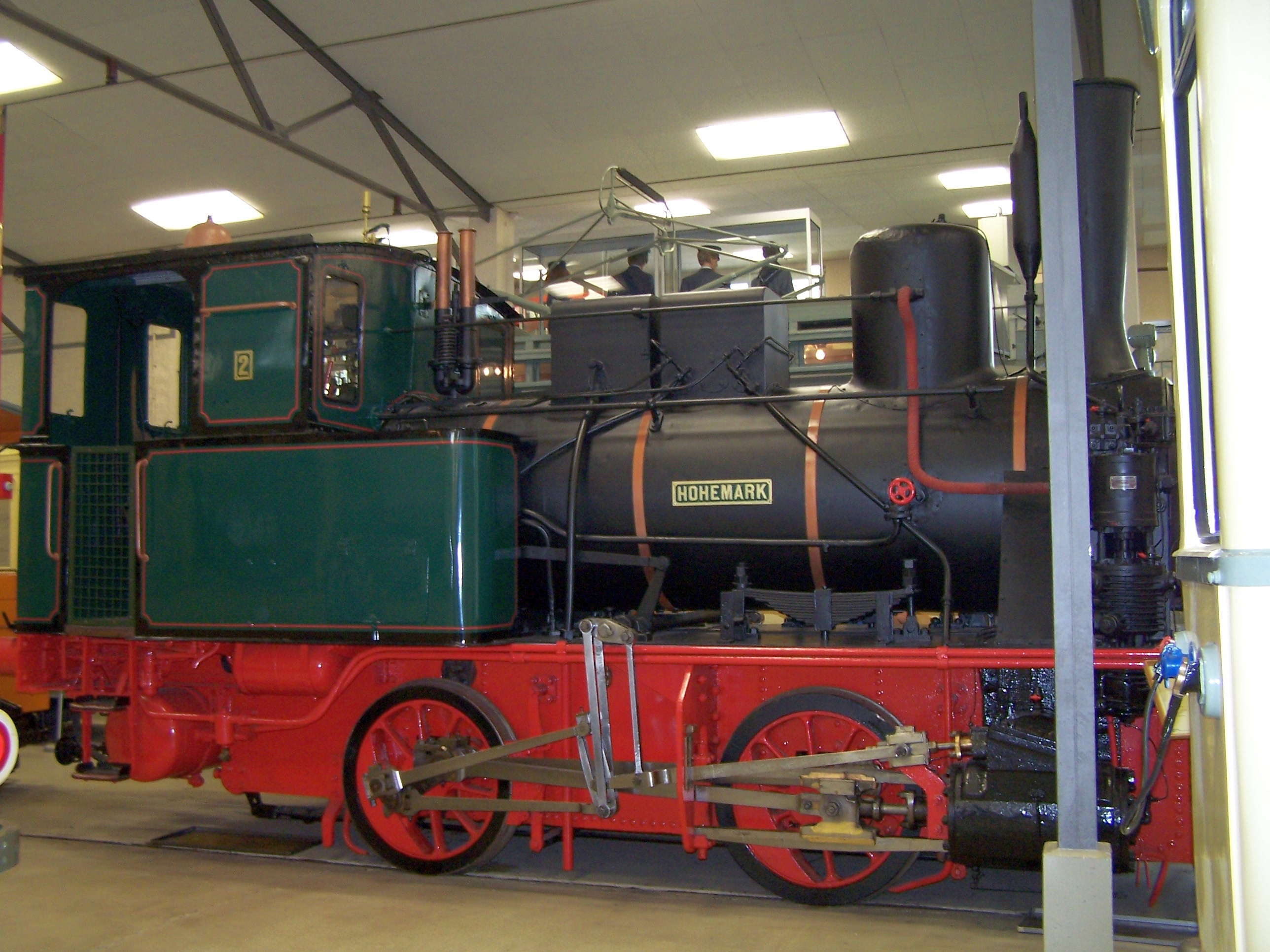
Hagans Bn2t steam locomotive HOHEMARK from 1900 in the Frankfurt am Main Transport Museum

Maschinenfabrik Christian Hagans (Christian Hagans Engineering Works) was a German locomotive manufacturer founded on 1 July 1857 in Erfurt, Germany, by Christian Hagans.

By the mid-1860s, the company had started building locomotive boilers and other components; in 1872 the first locomotive followed, a narrow gauge engine for a rail gauge of 750 mm. As a result of shortages of space, Hagans often had to limit its operations. For example, the T 15 was built by Henschel because Hagans did not have the necessary capacity. In 1903 the factory site was moved to Ilversgehofen north of the city; only then was large-scale production possible.

On 30 June 1915 the locomotive factory was sold, with effect from 1 April 1916, to the Maschinenbau R. Wolf Magdeburg-Buckau. In 1928, steam locomotive manufacture finally came to an end in Erfurt. By then Hagans had built 1,251 locomotives. The last Hagans engine was a DRG Class 64.

== Hagans locomotive ==
A type of articulated steam locomotive is named after Hagans. It had two groups of coupled wheels that moved together and which were connected via swinging lever system (Schwinghebelsystem), so that the locomotive managed with one pair of cylinders.

Examples are the Baden VIII d, the Prussian T 13 and the Prussian T 15.

== Preserved locomotives ==
- ČSD U 36.003 (ex Göllnitztalbahn No. 3) with the Košice Children's Heritage Railway (in regular operation)
- HOHEMARK No.2 in the Frankfurt am Main Transport Museum

89 7462 DB museum Koblenz

== Literature ==
- Geoff Murdoch. Tasmania's Hagans: the North East Dundas Tramway articulated J class. The author, 1998. ISBN 0-646-33442-5
- Hagans, Friedrich; Lohr, Hermann; Thielmann, Dr. Georg: Lokomotiven von Hagans, Transpress, Berlin 1991, ISBN 978-3-344-00473-6
- Karl-Ernst Maedel: Aus der Dampfzeit: Erinnerungen und Erzählungen aus einer vergangenen Epoche, München 1999, Geramond, ISBN 3-932785-98-3
