= Du Croo & Brauns =

Dutch machine factory

Du Croo & Brauns was a Dutch machine factory which produced railway equipment and later locomotives. Many of them were built for customers in Indonesia.

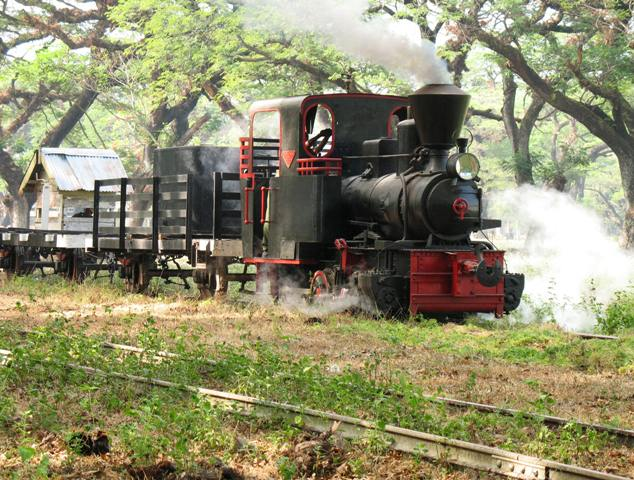
A Du Croo & Brauns 0-6-0T locomotive working on the Cepu Forest Railway in 2010

== History ==
Engelbert Adolf Du Croo, who had been born in Surabaya, Indonesia, worked for a foreign company manufacturing rolling stock for narrow gauge railways. In 1906, having gained experience in that field, he set up his own business in Amsterdam, with his first catalogue proclaiming: "Why not protect Dutch industry and make it possible to get Dutch-made rolling stock that is more solid and better finished at the same price as abroad?" Two years later, he entered into a partnership with Pieter Johan Christiaan Brauns, and the company became N.V. Du Croo & Brauns. Subsequently, the name changed again, to Constructiewerkplaatsen, v/h Du Croo & Brauns.

In 1917, they set up a subsidiary company called N.V. Machinefabriek Du Croo & Brauns, which was based in Weesp, in the north of Holland. The subsidiary's main emphasis was on the production of narrow gauge locomotives. A large proportion of the products were exported to the Dutch East Indies, now Indonesia. The first locomotive was supplied in 1922, and the company built 276 steam locomotives, 117 diesel locomotives, 11 traction engines and five boilers. Most of these were produced prior to 1952, after which very few were built. Of the steam locomotives, around 75 per cent were exported to Indonesia. In addition to conventional locomotives, the company also built 61 articulated Mallet locomotives. They produced 12 in 1926, which were rated at 60hp, and 48 between 1927 and 1940, which were rated at 80hp. A single machine rated at 100hp was produced in 1930. All were built for 700 mm (2 ft 3 9/16 in) gauge railways in Indonesia.

In 1947, Du Croo & Brauns set up a joint venture with Linde-Teves & Stokvis, which was officially known as NV Smalspoorwerkplaatsen Ducrobrauns-Lindeteves, but was normally abbreviated to Ducrolinde. Linde-Teves had wide experience of supplying narrow gauge rolling stock to the Dutch East Indies, Malaysia and Thailand, prior to the Secord World War. The equipment was mainly of Genman origin, with locomotives from Henschel and wagons and trackwork from Dolberg. Ducrolinde was managed from Amsterdam by Linde-Teves, who worked entirely on commission. They promoted the sale of Du Croo & Brauns products, and where drawing or project work was required by their customers, this was passed to Du Croo & Brauns. The commission they earned varied from three percent on rails and four percent on locomotives, up to ten percent on items such as fasteners and axle boxes. After 1952, the company concentrated on other products besides railway equipment, and was wound up in 1983. Most of its records were destroyed when the company ceased trading, and so details of its activities are sparse.

== Preservation ==
There are still a number of Du Croo & Brauns locomotives working in Indonesia. In 2023, the Stoomtrein Katwijk Museum at Leiden obtained two and moved them to the museum. Negotiations had started 21 years previously, when the locomotives were still operational. With help from the Indonesian Embassy in The Hague, the museum finally obtained them. One condition of the transfer is that they will offer their expertise at restoration to the Indonesians for future projects in that country.

Locomotive 81 was built in 1925 for a sugar factory in Jakarta, and was later sold to the Sumberhadjo sugar factory. It continued to work there until 2017, when it was replaced by a diesel locomotive. It was relatively complete at the time of transfer, and was not expected to need much work to restore it to running order. Locomotive 159 of 1928 worked at the Klampok sugar factory in East Java, and moved to another sugar factory when the Klampok became bankrupt in the 1930s. It ceased to be used in 2005, and a number of its components had been removed by the time it was sold to the museum. Consequently, restoration will be more difficult.
