= Trams in Surabaya =

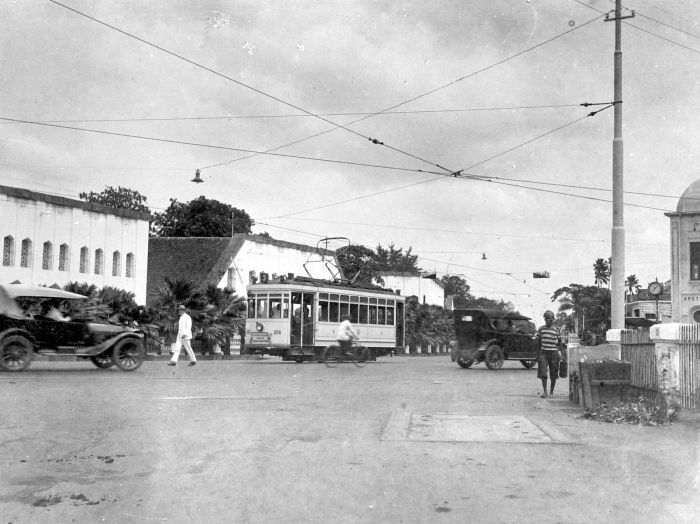
- An electric tram passed through a street in Surabaya

Operation
- Locale: Surabaya
- Open: 1889
- Close: 1978
- Status: Closed
- Owner: Kereta Api Indonesia (assets)
- Operator(s): Oost-Java Stoomtram Maatschappij (1889–1949); Kereta Api Indonesia (1949–1978)

Infrastructure
- Track gauge: 1,067 mm (3 ft 6 in)
Overview
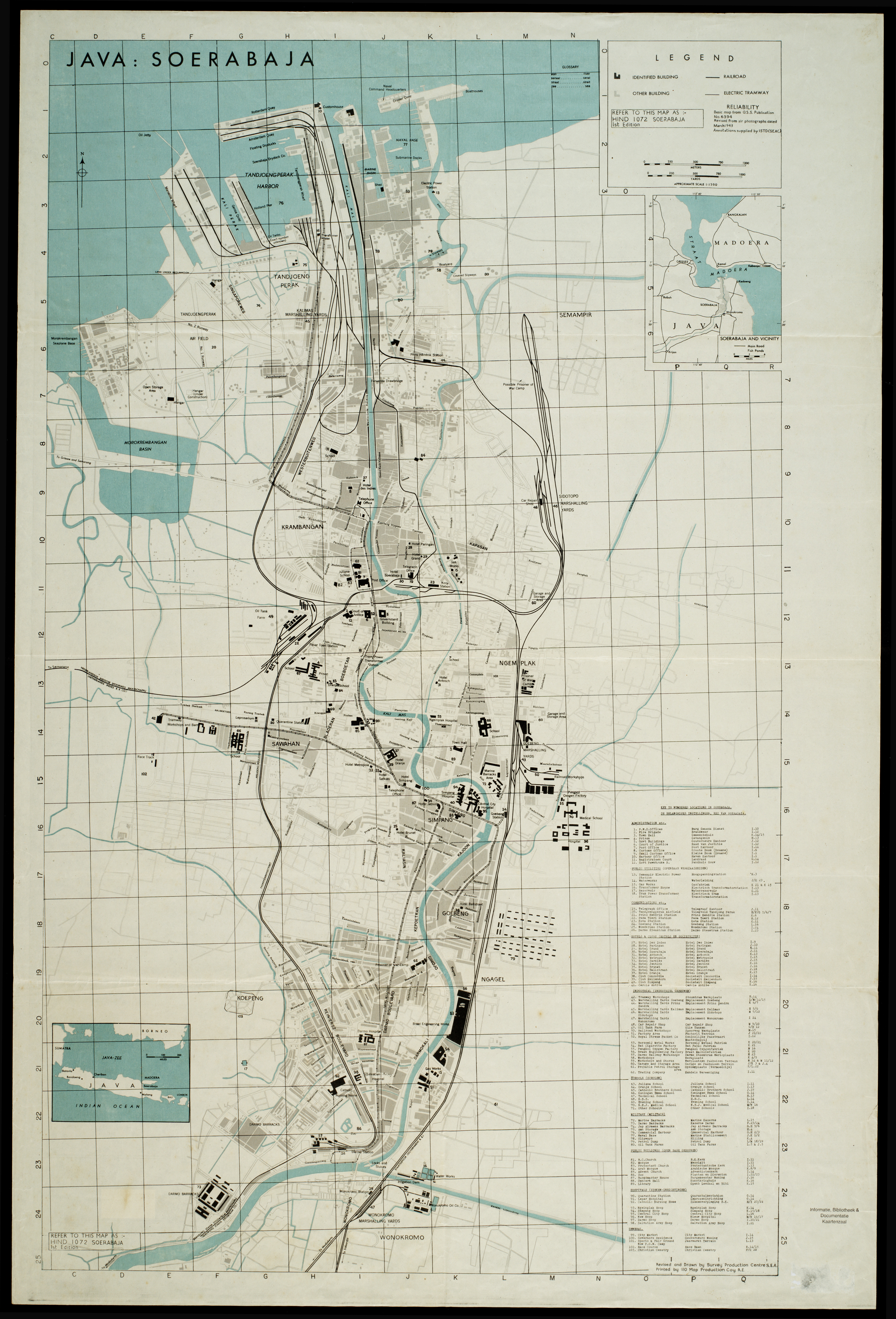
Website

There was a tram system in Surabaya, East Java, Indonesia from 1889 to 1978. The tramway was operated by a private company Oost-Java Stoomtram Maatschappij (OJS, "East Java Steam Tram Company"), and later by Kereta Api Indonesia (KAI), and was the only OJS-owned rail system survived in post-independence Indonesia. The tramway linked Ujung (Port of Tanjung Perak) with Wonokromo and continued towards Krian in Sidoarjo. All land assets of the tramway is currently owned by Operational Area VII Surabaya of the KAI.

== History ==
As the initial capital of the company, the OJS started to build a steam-powered tram line in Surabaya in 1889. The first section, Ujung–Fort Prins Hendrik, was inaugurated on 10 December 1889. The line mostly runs along the banks of Mas River.

In early 20th century, the OJS was interested in the Bataviasche Elektrische Tram Maatschappij (BETM) success in developing electric trams in Batavia. To prepare for electric tram installation, in 1911 the OJS expanded its network so that almost the entire city of Surabaya was connected by tram lines. It reached 36 kilometers of length as of 1924. The electric tram system was officially opened on 15 May 1923.

During expansion, the main line was completely overhauled; the route that previously passed through the banks of Mas River was diverted through the city center, running past Pasar Turi and Sawahan and followed Darmo Street in the city center. Other lines built are the Simpang–Wonokromo Kota, Simpang–Gubeng, Tunjungan–Sawahan, and Simpang–Kalimas. To support tram maintenance, a tram depot and a power plant were also built in Sawahan. However, during the Japanese occupation the Karangpilang–Krian OJS section was finally scrapped by Japanese rōmusha workers along with all OJS lines outside Surabaya. Although the tram stop names were recorded in the data, they were unable to save the tracks and stops from their dismantling.

The tram network was nationalized and operated by DKARI (currently KAI) in 1949. The electric tramway was dismantled in late 1960s, and the remaining steam tramway was finally closed in 1978.

== Line sections ==
Initially, all OJS tram lines were steam trams. In 1911, to prepare for electric trams, OJS expanded its network until almost the entire city of Surabaya was connected to the railway so that in 1924 all Surabaya tram lines were electric trams. These are the tramway sections in Surabaya according to the book Buku Jarak Antarstasiun dan Perhentian by the KAI.

Line	Length
Ujung–Wonokromo Kota–Krian OJS	13.2 km
Wonokromo Kota–Willemplein (Jembatan Merah)	8.4 km
Willemplein–Tanjung Perak	4,9 km
Simpang branch for Surabaya Gubeng Station	0.2 km
Boulevard–Palmerah branch	2 km
Tunjungan–Sawahan	2.6 km

== Connected lines ==
The regular service of this line is not directly connected to any other line. To change modes, users must get off the train and walk to the nearest SS/NIS station. Some of the stops are located right in front of major train stations, such as in front of Pasar Turi Station and Gubeng Station.

=== Active lines ===
There used to be a connecting line that connected the steam tram network with the active line north of Surabaya Kota Station. However, this line was only for transferring steam tram vehicles to be sent to the SS Balai Yasa. This line was never used for regular passenger services.

=== Inactive line ===
- Wonokromo City–Krian

== Gallery ==
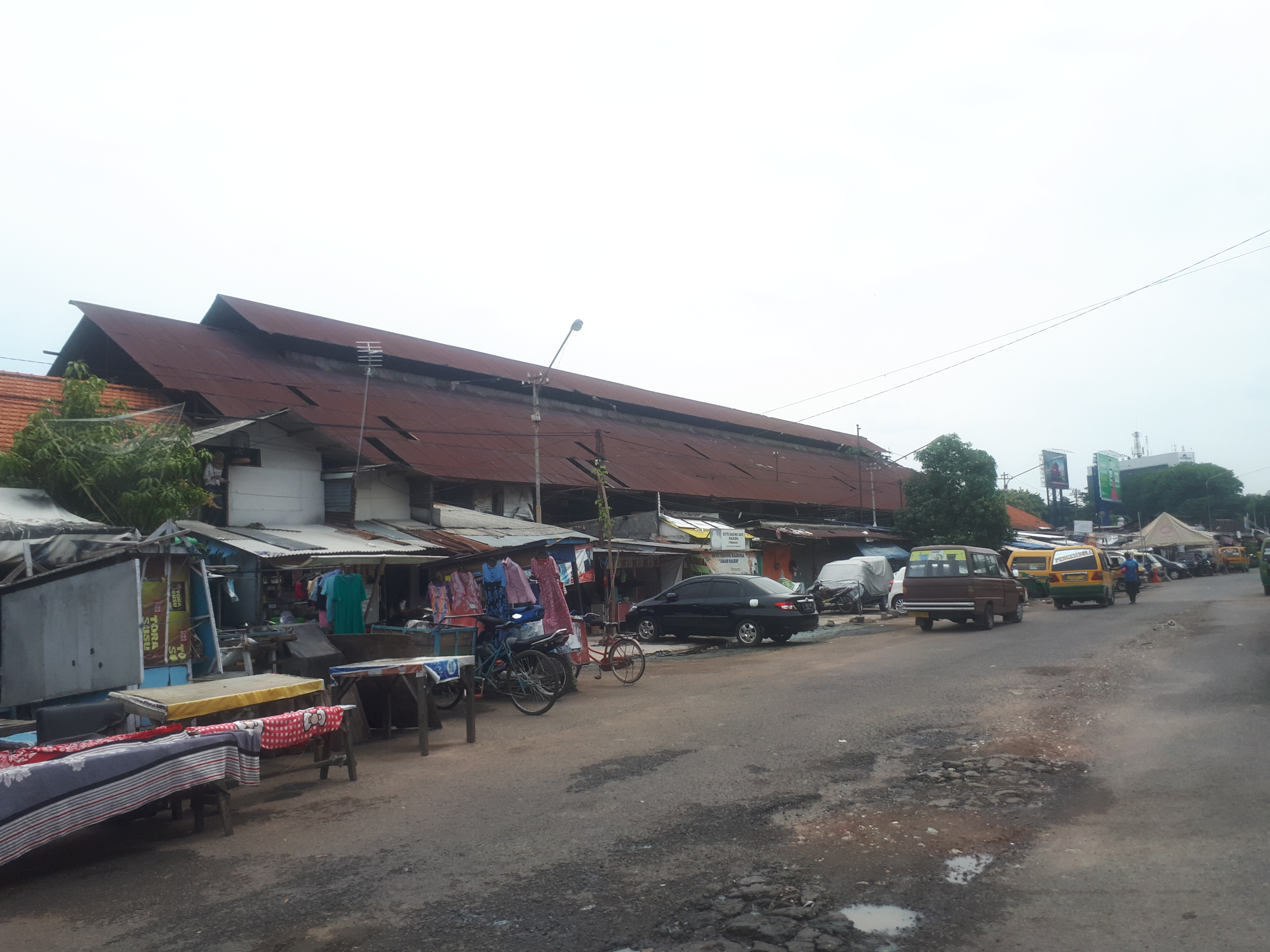
Wonokromo Kota tram station in 2020, located not too far from the counterpart train station

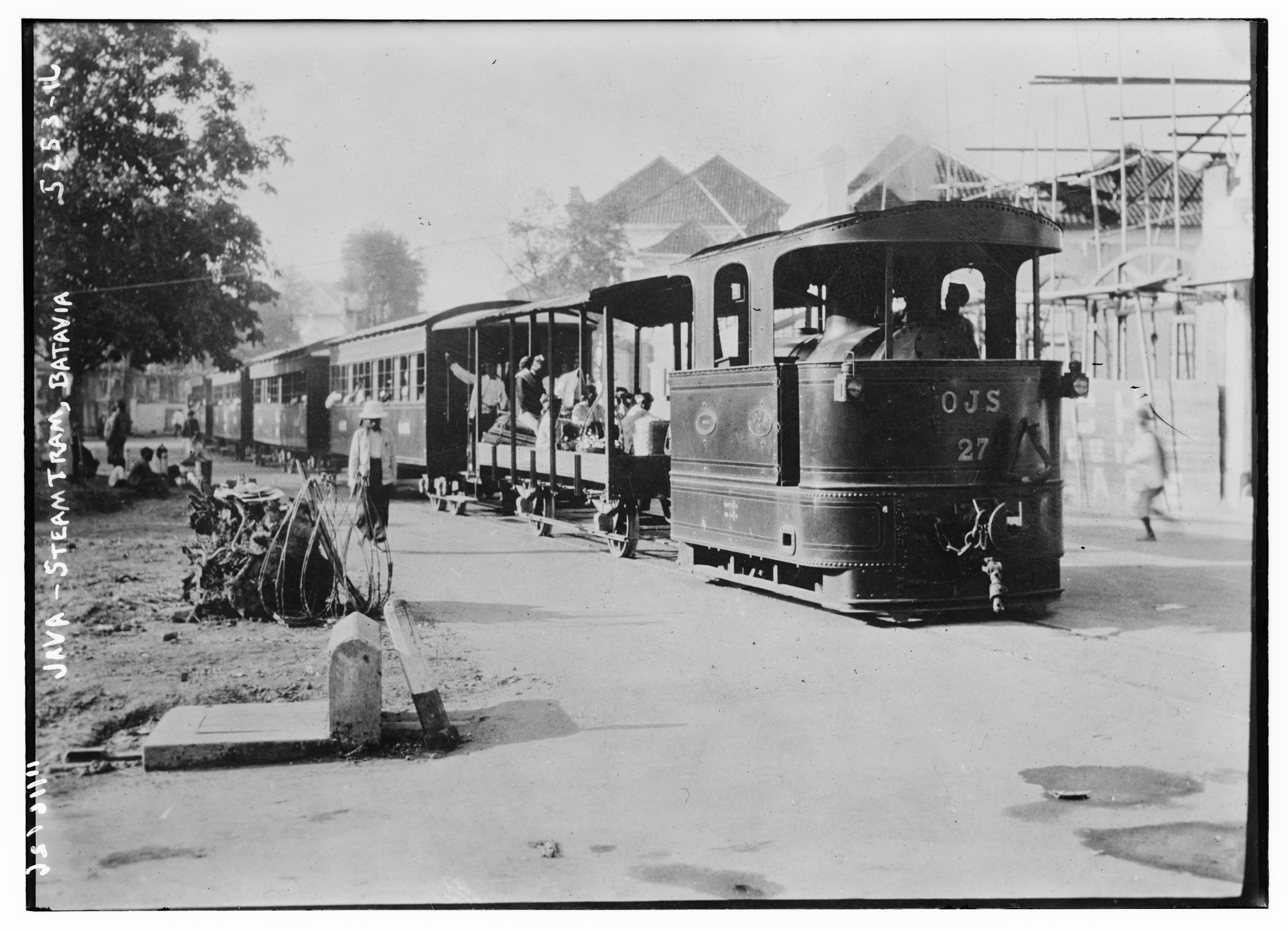
A steam tram pulled by OJS No. 27 locomotive

== See also ==
- Trams in Jakarta
