= Samarang–Joana Stoomtram Maatschappij =

Samarang–Joana Stoomtram Maatschappij, N.V.
Overview
- Headquarters: Semarang, Central Java, Dutch East Indies
- Dates of operation: 1879–1959
- Successor: Kereta Api Indonesia

Technical
- Track gauge: 1,067 mm (3 ft 6 in)
- Length: 417 kilometres (259 mi)

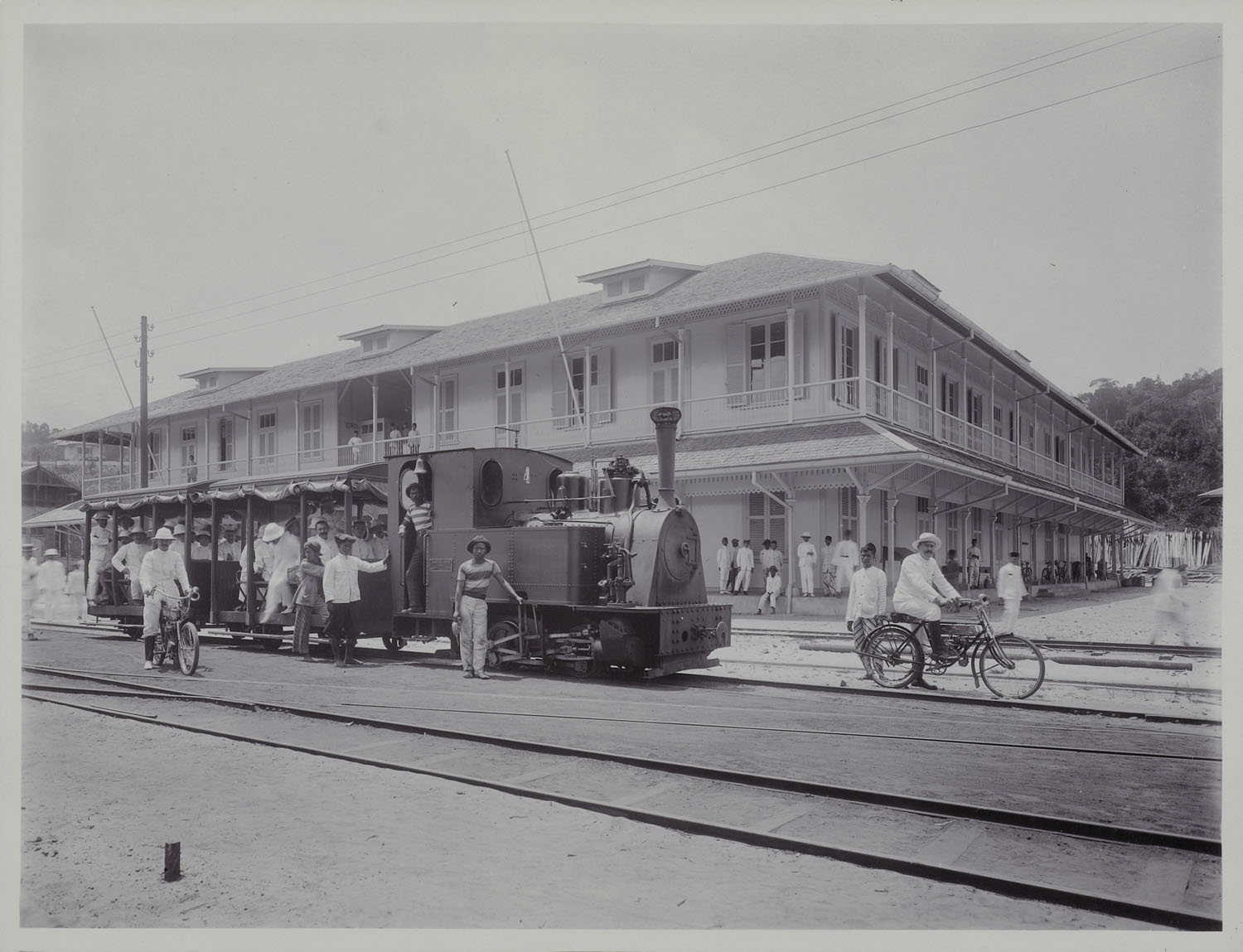
Samarang–Joana Stoomtram Maatschappij

The Samarang–Joana Stoomtram Maatschappij, N.V. (SJS, Dutch for Steam Tram Company Samarang–Joana) was from 1879 to 1959 a private tram company on the Dutch East Indies (now Central Java), providing passenger and freight trains on a 417 kilometres (259 mi) long network with a gauge of 1,067 mm (3 ft 6 in).

== History ==
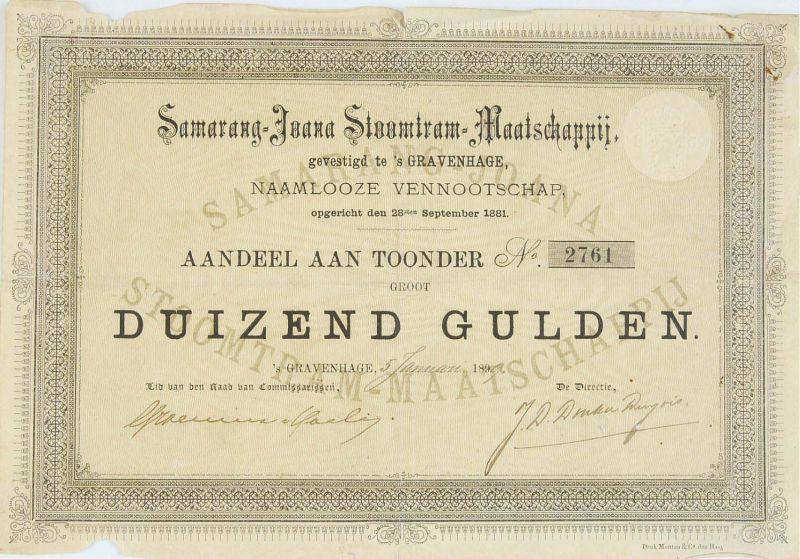
SJS stock exchange certificate, 1899

The steam tram company was founded on 18 March 1881 by JF Dijkman, W Walker and GH Clifford and put into operation on 28 September 1881. It aimed to connect Semarang with Kudus and Pati via a railway line, as defined in the permit concessions of the Colonial Government of the Dutch East Indies of 1 December 1879.

The first director of the company was Baron Henri Maarten Anton van der Goes van Dirxland (born 30 November 1841 in The Hague; died 29 January 1890), who has also been Director of the Oost-Java Stoomtram Maatschappij since 7 June 1888. He was assisted by a Council Secretary named CLJ Martens.

The most important station was the Jurnatan Station, which was also called Semarang-Centraal or Djoernatan. It was expanded in 1913 from a small tram stop to a large train station. It was not included in the list of listed railway stations in Indonesia in 1950 and taken out of service in 1974.

=== Lines ===
The lines and its sections including their inauguration dates are listed in following table:

| Line | Section | Inauguration | (km) |
|---|---|---|---|
| Jurnatan–Jomblang on-street running | Jurnatan–Jomblang | 1 December 1882 | 4.4 |
| Jurnatan–Bulu–Banjir Kanal on-street running | Jurnatan–Bulu | 12 March 1883 | 3 |
| Jurnatan–Bulu–Banjir Kanal on-street running | Bulu–Banjir Kanal | 4 November 1899 | 0,8 |
| Cabang Jurnatan–Samarang NIS | Jurnatan–Samarang | 12 March 1883 | 1 |
| Jurnatan–Demak | Jurnatan–Genuk | 2 July 1883 | 6.1 |
| Jurnatan–Demak | Genuk–Demak | 27 September 1883 | 19.7 |
| Demak–Kudus | Demak–Kudus | 15 March 1884 | 26.4 |
| Demak–Kudus | Demak-Kudus | 1919 | 26 |
| Kudus–Juwana | Kudus–Pati | 19 April 1884 | 21.2 |
| Kudus–Juwana | Kudus–Pati | 1919 | 23.2 |
| Kudus–Juwana | Pati–Juwana | 19 April 1884 | 13.8 |
| Juwana–Rembang | Juwana–Rembang | 1 May 1900 | 23 |
| Juwana–Tayu | Juwana–Trangkil | 20 May 1899 | 8.2 |
| Juwana–Tayu | Trangkil–Bulumanis | 15 August 1899 | 7.5 |
| Juwana–Tayu | Bulumanis–Tayu | 1 May 1900 | 8.8 |
| Kudus–Mayong–Pecangaan | Kudus-Mayong | 6 September 1887 | 11.5 |
| Kudus–Mayong–Pecangaan | Kudus-Mayong | 1919 | 14 |
| Kudus–Mayong–Pecangaan | Mayong–Pecangaan | 5 May 1895 | 10.3 |
| Mayong–Welahan | Mayong–Welahan | 10 November 1900 | 5.5 |
| Demak–Purwodadi | Demak–Godong | 15 November 1888 | 20.8 |
| Demak–Purwodadi | Godong–Purwodadi | 1 April 1889 | 18 |
| Purwodadi–Wirosari–Blora | Purwodadi–Wirosari | 1 October 1889 | 21.4 |
| Purwodadi–Wirosari–Blora | Wirosari-Kunduran | 16 September 1893 | 18.3 |
| Purwodadi–Wirosari–Blora | Kunduran–Ngawen | 22 March 1894 | 10.3 |
| Purwodadi–Wirosari–Blora | Ngawen–Blora | 13 September 1894 | 15.3 |
| Purwodadi–Gundih | Purwodadi–Gundih | 1884 | 17.3 |
| Purwodadi–Gundih | Purwodadi–Ngrombo | 1 January 1892 | 9 |
| Wirosari–Kradenan | Wirosari–Kradenan | 1 November 1898 | 8.2 |
| Rembang–Blora | Rembang–Blora | 15 June 1902 | 36.8 |
| Blora–Cepu | Rembang-Cepu | 1 November 1901 | 33.4 |
| Blora–Cepu | Cepu Kota (SJS)–Cepu (NIS): | 1 February 1903 | 1.8 |
| Rembang–Bojonegoro | Rembang-Lasem | 1 May 1900 | 14 |
| Rembang–Bojonegoro | Lasem-Pamotan | 1 June 1914 | 10 |
| Rembang–Bojonegoro | Pamotan-Jatirogo | 20 February 1919 | 24 |

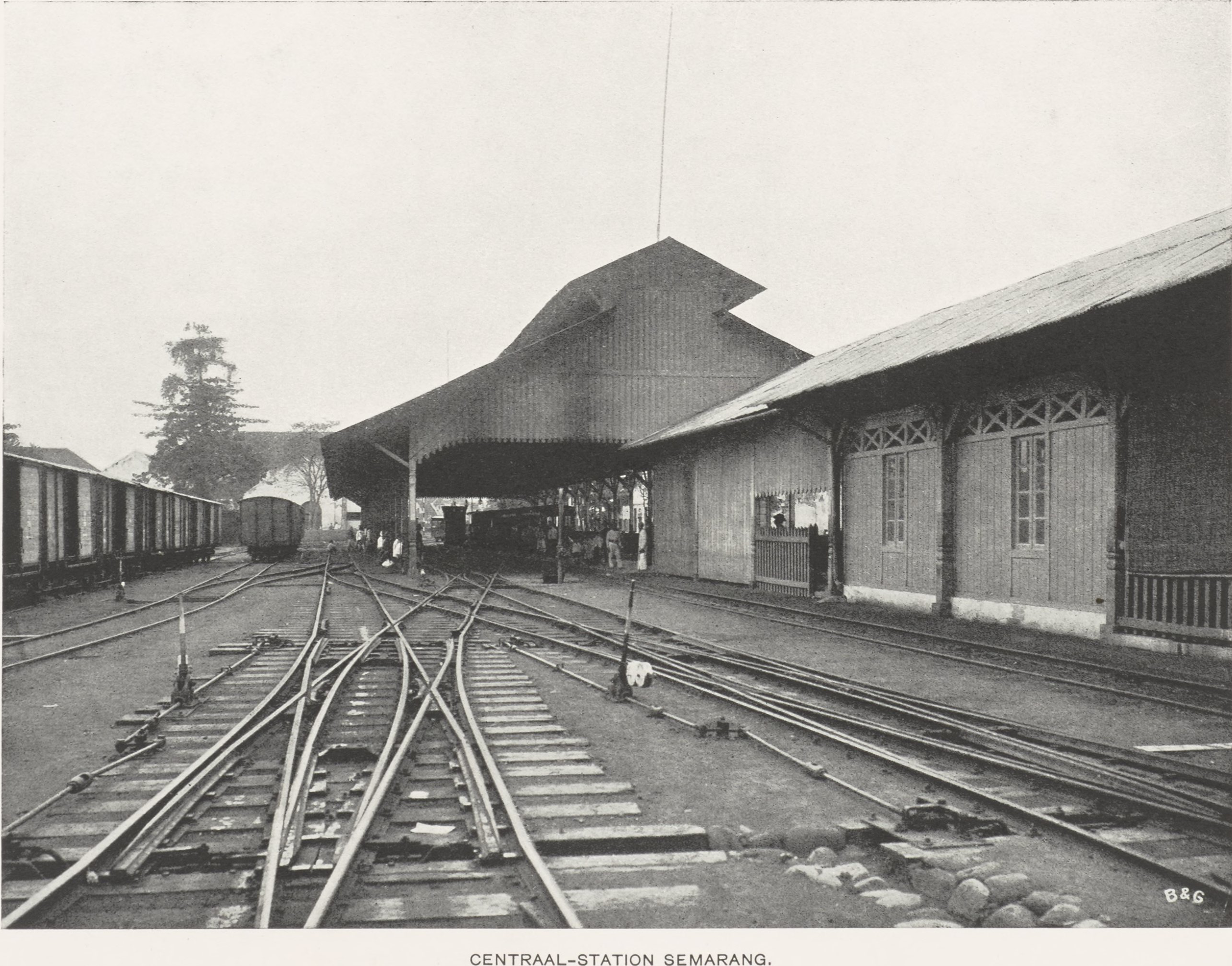
Central Station Semarang

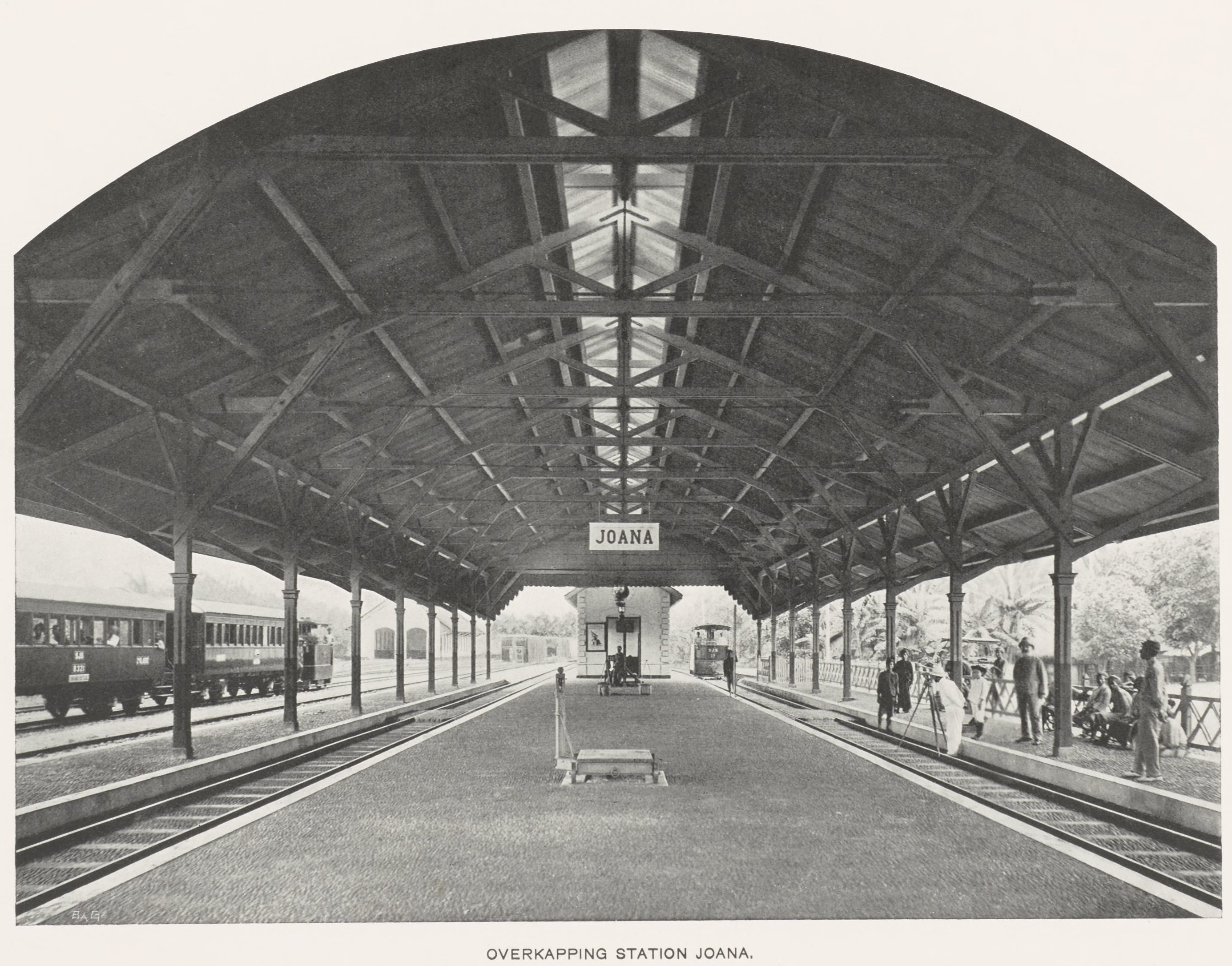
Roof of Station Joana

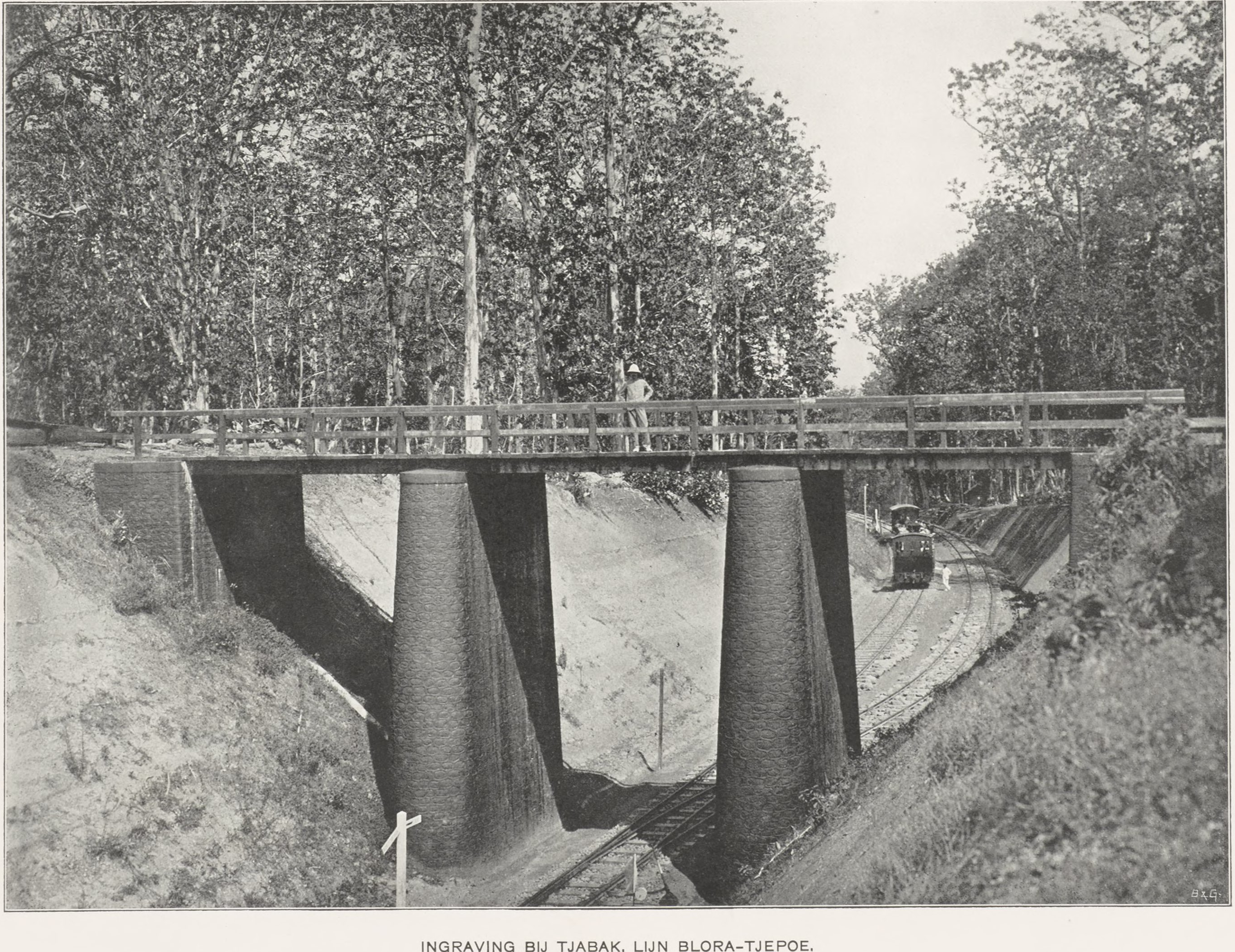
Cutting at Tjabak, Lij Blora–Cepu

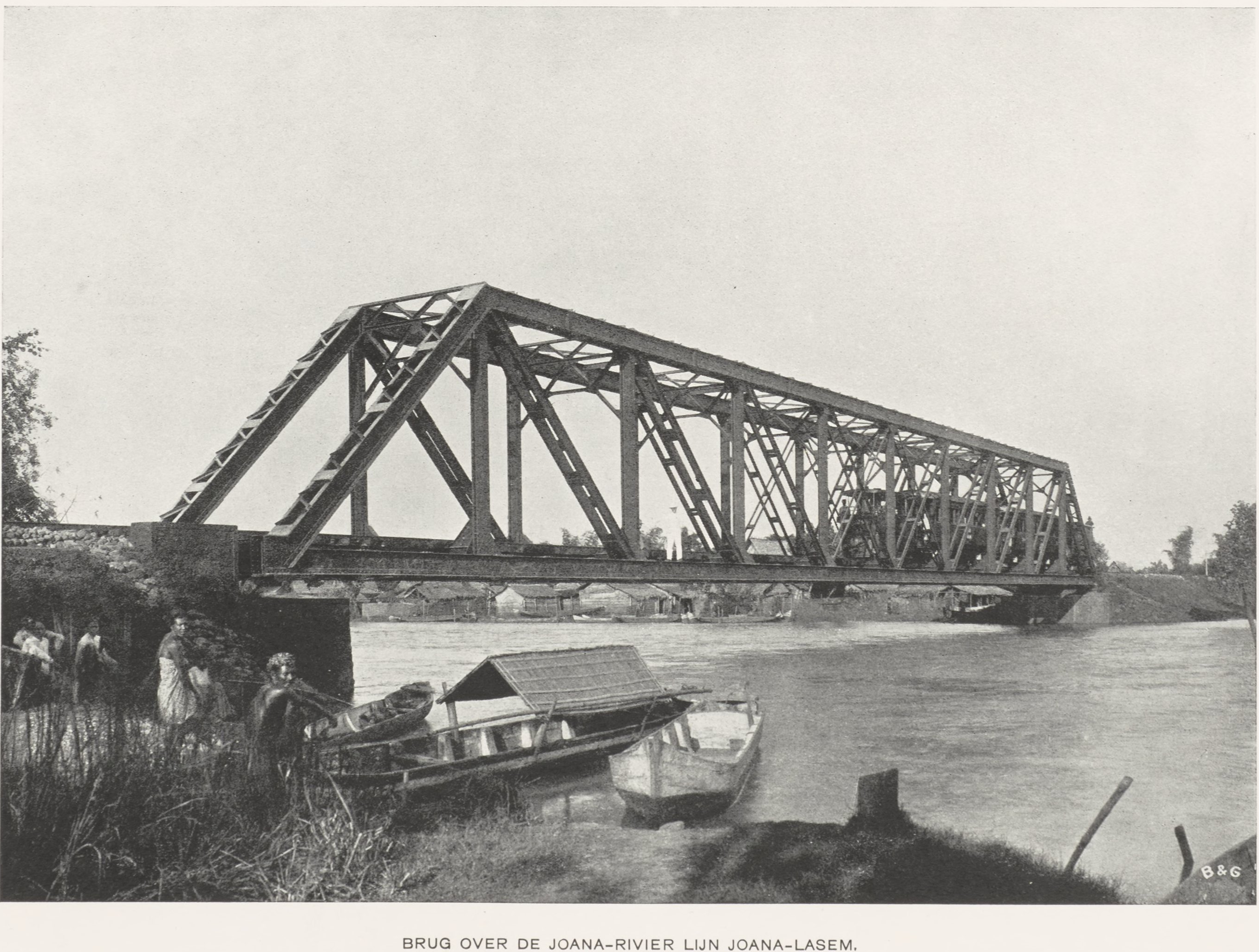

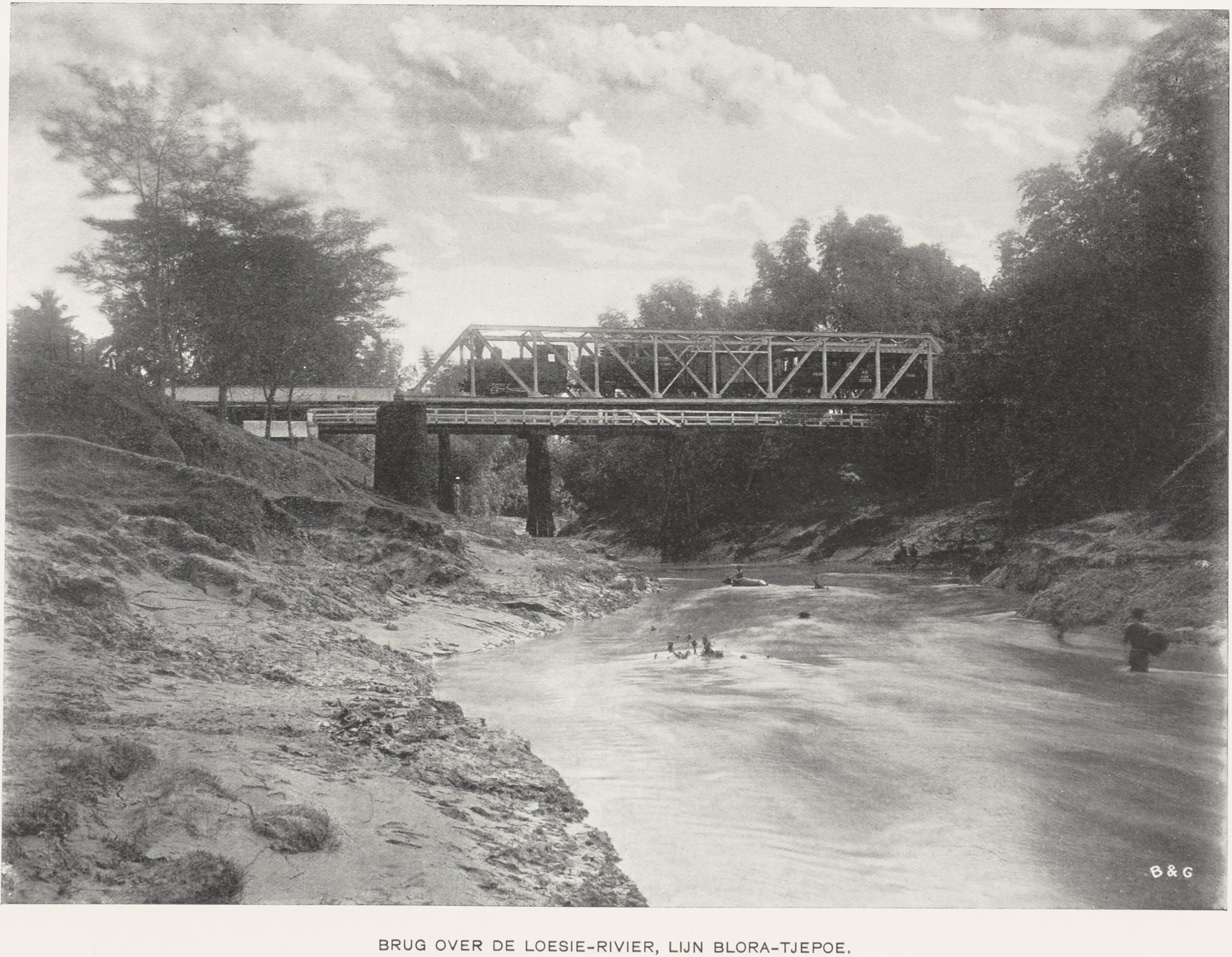
Bridge over the Loesie River, Blora–Tjepoe

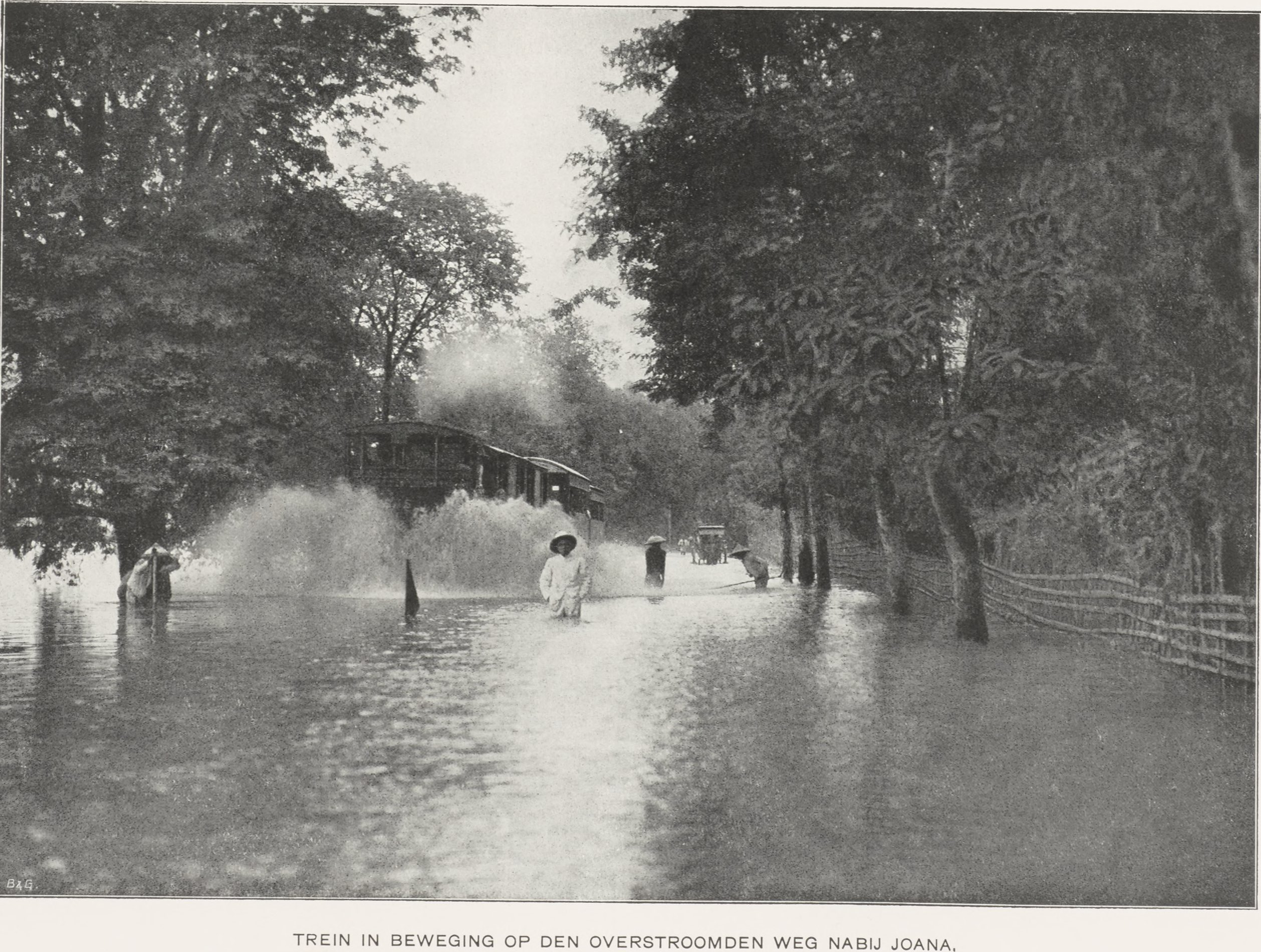
Operation during a flood

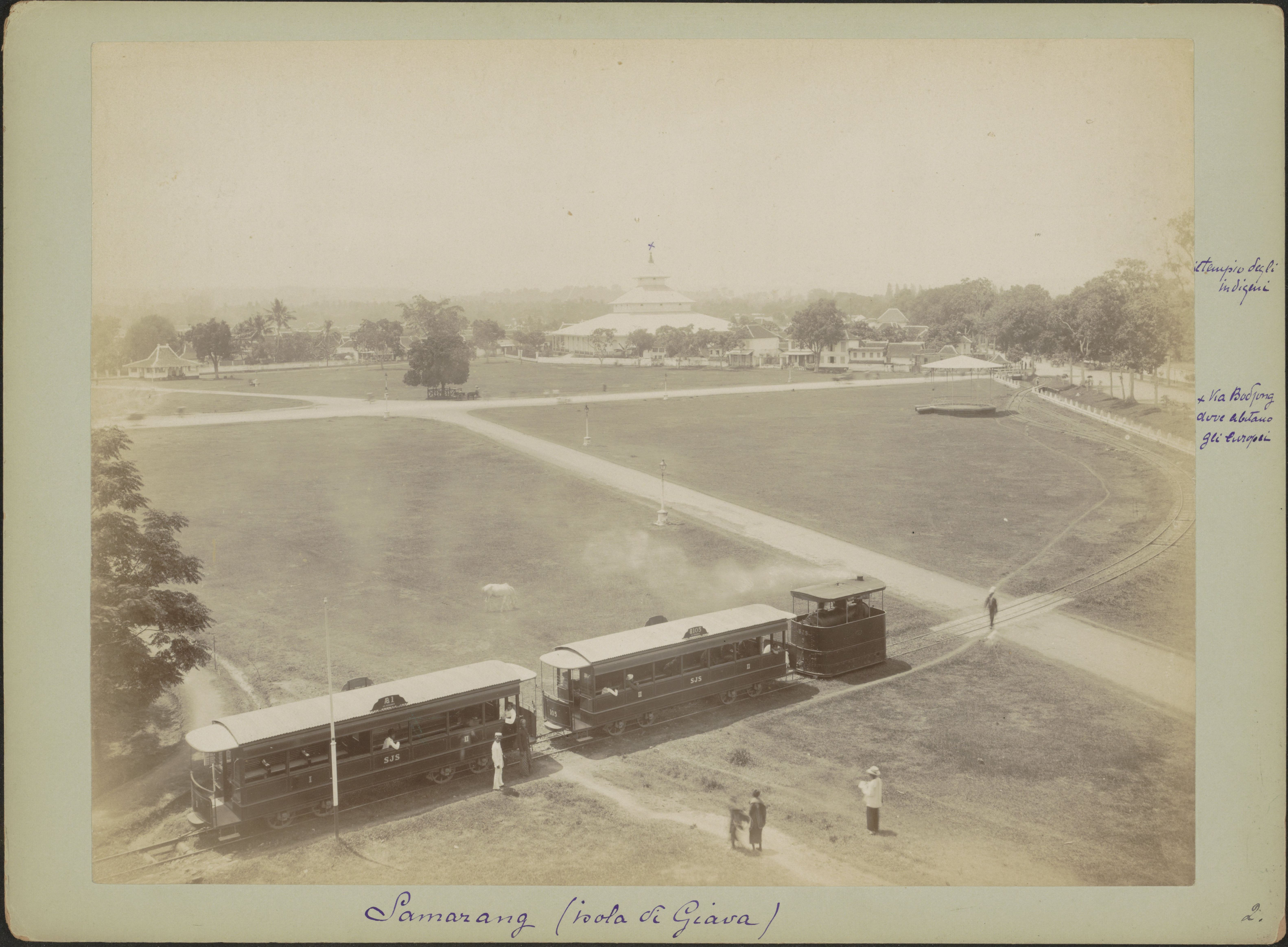
SJS steam tram, in Semarang

=== Harbour spurs ===
Following spurs were built to improve the access to the harbours for import and export of goods and natural produce

| Pelabuhan | Panjang |
|---|---|
| Tanjung Emas | 1.5 km (0.93 miles) |
| Juwana | 1.9 km (1.2 miles) |
| Rembang | 0.5 km (0.31 miles) |

=== Nationalization and decommissioning ===
Due to the 1959 Government Decree No. 40 of the Republic of Indonesia issued under President Sukarno, all steam and tram lines operated by Dutch companies were nationalized and handed over to Djawatan Kereta Api (DKA).

The SJS railway continued to operate under the DKA and PNKA until the golden age of PJKA in the 1970s. In 1975, the lines Kudus–Bakalan and Juwana–Tayu were shut down. The decommissioning of the route Cepu Kota–Rembang took place in 1984. In 1986, the lines Kemijen–Rembang and Purwodadi–Ngemplak were shut down. The route Rembang–Jatirogo was decommissioned in 1992. The last SJS routes, Blora–Demak and Wirosari–Kradenan were decommissioned in 1996. Although most tracks have not yet been dismantled, there are no concrete plans for reactivation.

== Locomotives ==
All locomotive of the SJS were steam locomotives. Until the 1960s, no diesel locomotives were used on the SJS. For the maintenance of locomotives and trains southeast of the Semarang Tawang Station a central railway depot, whose building was demolished in the mid-1990s. The SJS steam locomotives are listed in the following table:

| Class | Inauguration | Manufacturer | Amount | Photo | Remarks |
|---|---|---|---|---|---|
| B11 | 1883 | Beyer, Peacock & Company | 4 locomotives, subsequently used by Nederlandsch-Indische Spoorweg Maatschappij | | |
| B12 | 1881 | Werkspoor | 46 locomotives, some of which were subsequently used by Oost-Java Stoomtram Maatschappij | | Plinthed in front of Stasiun Surabaya Pasarturi |
| B20 | 1882 | Beyer, Peacock & Company dan Werkspoor | 19 locomotives | | Exhibited at Museum KA Ambarawa |
| B27 | 1912 | Hartmann | 16 locomotives | | Exhibited at Museum KA Ambarawa |
| C19 | 1898 | Hartmann | 12 locomotives | | Exhibit at Museum Transportasi, Taman Mini Indonesia Indah (TMII), Jakarta |
| D10 | 1913 | Hartmann | 6 locomotives | | |
| D15 | 1931 | Hanomag | 5 locomotives | | |
