= Trams in Jakarta =

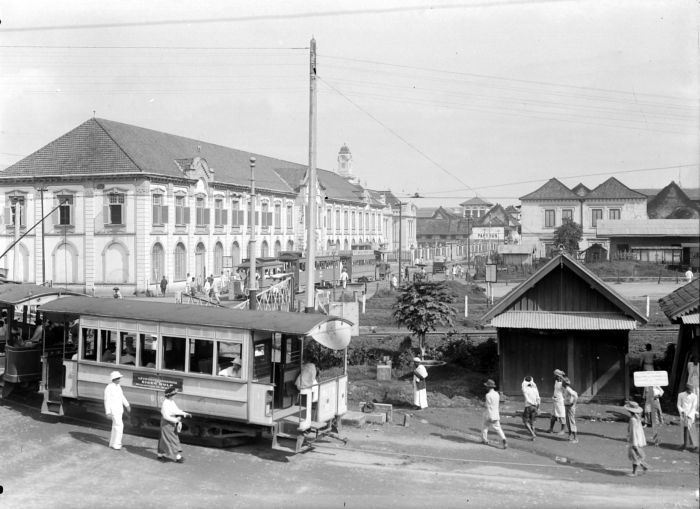

Operation
- Locale: Batavia, Dutch East Indies; Jakarta, Indonesia
- Status: Closed

Infrastructure
- Track gauge: 1,188 mm (3 ft 10 25/32 in)
- Minimum curve radius: ?

Statistics
Horsecar era: 1869–1883
- Status: Closed
- Operator: Bataviasche Tramweg-Maatschappij
- Track gauge: 1188 mm
- Propulsion system: Horses
Steam tram era: 1883–1933
- Status: Closed
- Operators: Dummler & Co.
- Track gauge: 1188 mm
- Propulsion system: Steam
Electric tram era: 1899–1962
- Status: Closed
- Lines: 6
- Owners: Bataviasche Verkeers Maatschappij, Indonesian government
- Operators: Bataviasche Verkeers Maatschappij, Pengangkutan Penumpang Djakarta
- Track gauge: 1188 mm
- Propulsion system: Electric
- Depot: Kramat
Overview
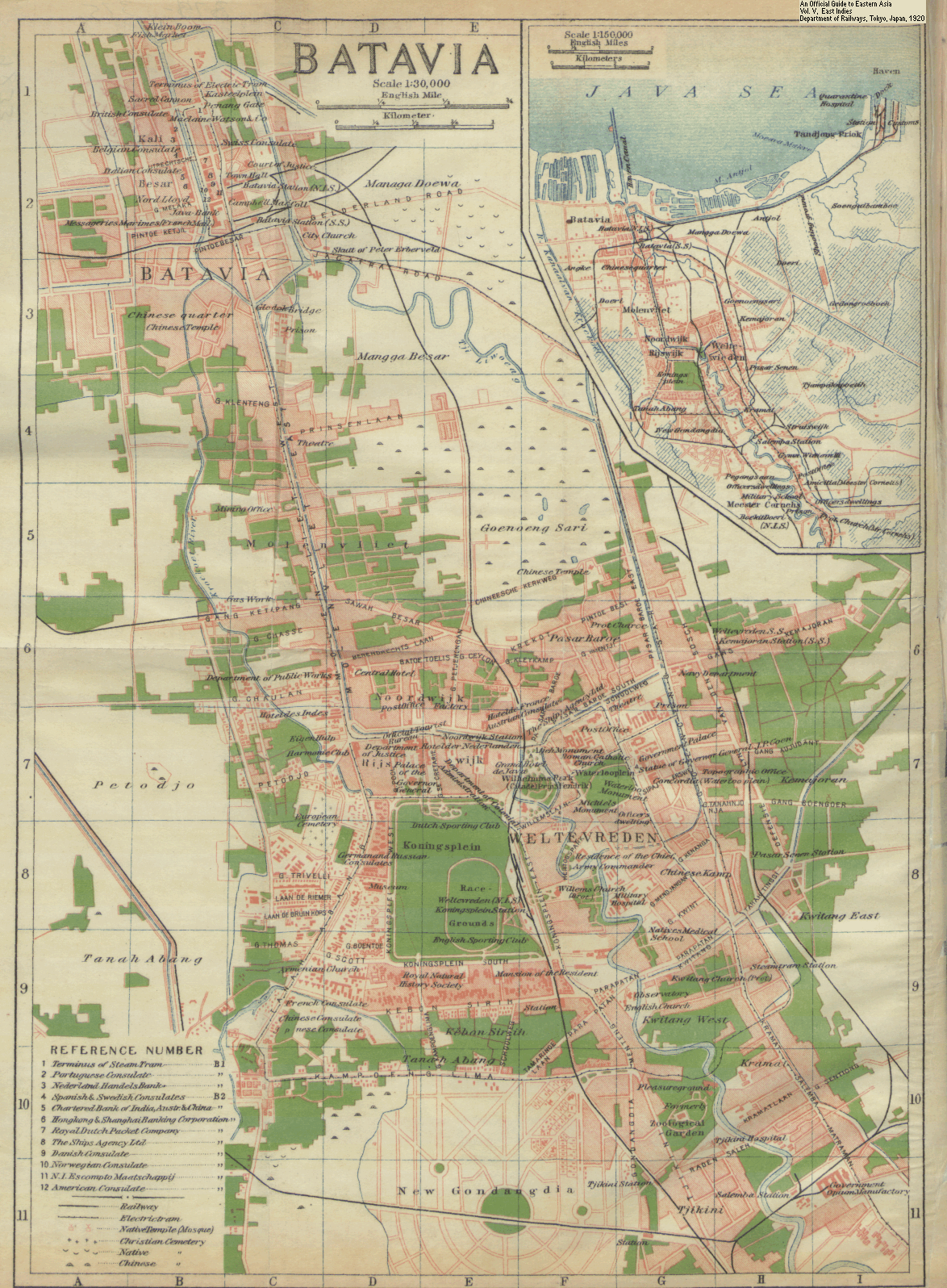

The Jakarta tram system was a transport system in Jakarta, Indonesia. Its first-generation tram network first operated as a horse tram system, and was eventually converted to electric trams in the early twentieth century.

== History ==
=== Dutch era ===
The first horse tram in Batavia was operated by Bataviasche Tramweg Maatschappij (BTM, Batavia Tramways Company). The horse tram line was inaugurated on 20 April 1869, long before trams existed in the Netherlands- using a gauge width of 1,188 mm (3 ft 10 25/32 in), connecting Batavia Old Town with Weltevreden. At the time the tram, pulled by 3-4 horses, could accommodate up to 40 passengers. In April 1869 an estimated 1,500 passengers had been served by the system and in September 1869 it was increased to 7,000 passengers.

As a result of horse trams operational problems experienced by the BTM, in 1880 the operation was handled temporarily by Firma Dummler & Co. Two years later, on 19 September 1881 Bataviasche Tramweg Maatschappij officially changed its name into Nederlands-Indische Tramweg Maatschappij (NITM, Netherlands Indies Tramways Company) and took over Batavia trams operation previously handled by Firma Dummler & Co. Under NITM, there was a gradual overhaul of its fleet and infrastructure, which the replacement of horse with steam locomotives produced by Hohenzollern Locomotive Works. The first locomotive was purchased for ƒ8,800 and the fleet replacement process was completed in 1884. The horse tram service was closed from 12 June 1882. NITM services reopened on 1 July 1883 with the inauguration of the steam tram service as well as the new Batavia Old Town–Harmonie line.

Four years after the operation of the Batavia Old Town–Harmoni steam tram line, electric trams was introduced under the operation of the Batavia Elektrische Tram Maatschappij (BETM, Batavia Electric Tram Company), making it a competitor to the NITM's steam tram. BETM began operation since the inauguration of Batavia Old Town–Ragunan Zoo line on 10 April 1899 which was extended to Tanah Abang Station in November 1899, but unfortunately the extension was closed in 1904. In 1900 BETM extended its tram network, reaching Jembatan Merah, Tanah Tinggi, and Gunung Sahari areas by crossing Ciliwung River. With the increasing number of years, BETM continued to expand its tram network until 1920, it marked with unhealthy competition between BETM and NITM. The competition caused ticket prices became too expensive that Batavia city government demanded NITM to upgrade its fleet to become electric-powered, but was refused by NITM itself.

As a result of the competition, the two began to impose transit tickets and special schedules during rush hour. On 31 July 1930 NITM and BTM were merged to form Bataviasche Verkeers Maatschappij (BVM, Batavia Transport Company). The merger combines 1 steam tram line, 2 trolleybus lines, and 7 bus routes operated by both NITM and BETM.

Under BVM, the tramways underwent significant changes. In former NITM routes, the electrification program was carried out from April 1933 to 1934. The electrification made the travel time from Batavia Old City to Jatinegara cut by 10 minutes. BVM experienced its peak in 1934, where it operating 5 electric tram lines with a total length of 41 kilometers.

The decline of the Batavia (Jakarta) tram began in 1935. As a result of Great Depression, BVM had financial problems, which its popularity was threatened by the emergence of other modes such as bemo and oplet. As a result of this financial constraint, the BVM bus service was closed and the company will only focus on the trolleybus service. The BVM bus service only reopened in 1941.

=== Post-Dutch era ===
In March 1942, the Dutch East Indies entered the Japanese occupation. The trams service managed by the BVM was taken over by the Japanese army and changed its name to the Nippon Batavia Tram Army. Then in June 1942 it was changed to Seibu Rikuyo Batavia Shiden, and then, Jakaruta Shiden (ジャカルタ市電, Jakarta Trams). Under the control of Jakaruta Shiden the Jakarta tram underwent overhaul, including abolishing the class system, dismissing BVM workers who were Dutch citizens, applying Japanese symbols on tram bodies, and doubling tracks on Gunung Sahari–Pal Putih line.

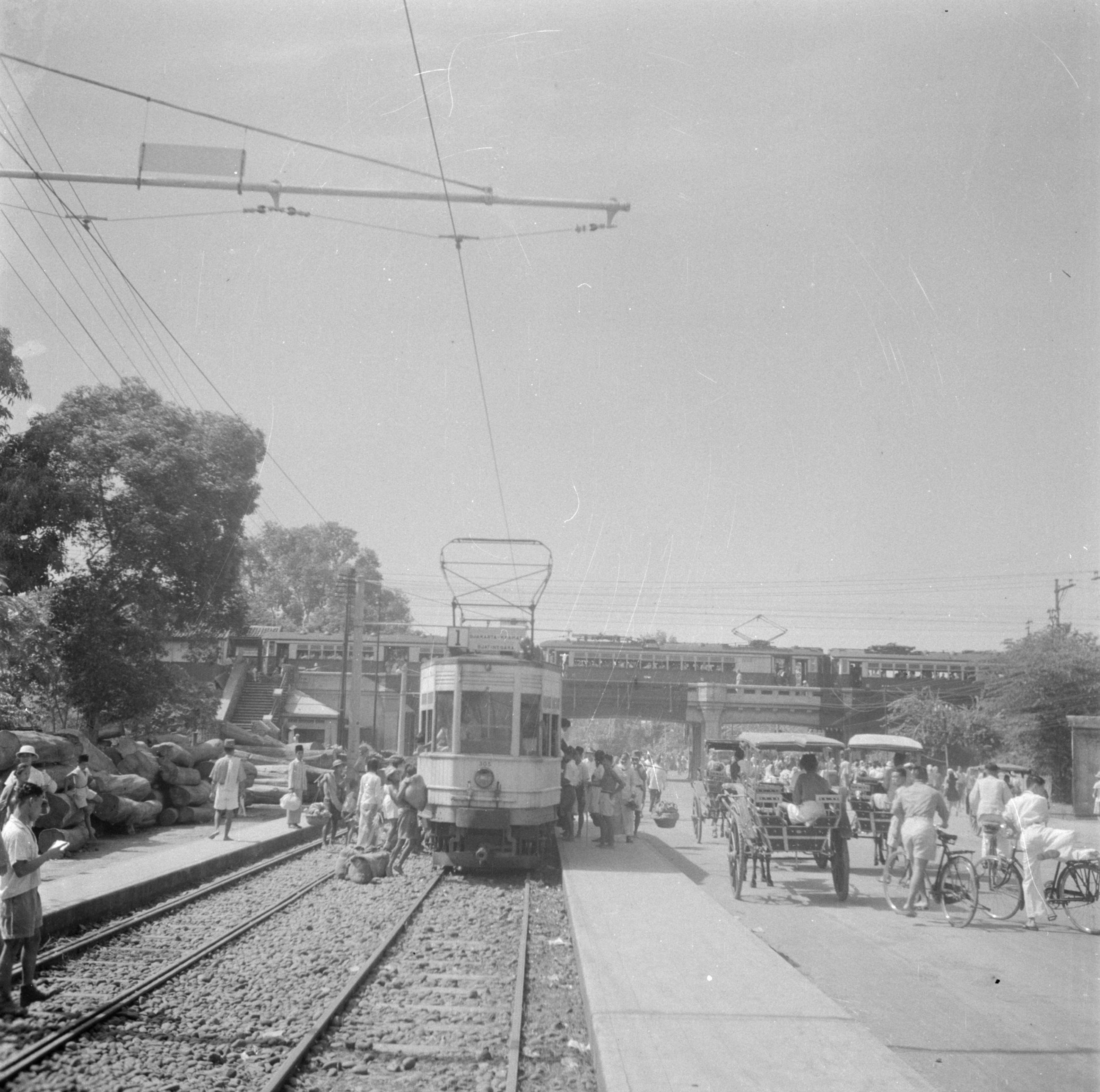
Tram in 1946

After Indonesian independence, Indonesians took over the Jakaruta Shiden system on 13 October 1945, and changed its name to the Djakarta-Kota Tram which in 1957 was nationalized as Pengangkutan Penumpang Djakarta (PPD, Djakarta Passenger Transport). Although it was taken over, PPD only operated the tram for some years and was abolished because it was deemed unsuitable for urban spatial planning.

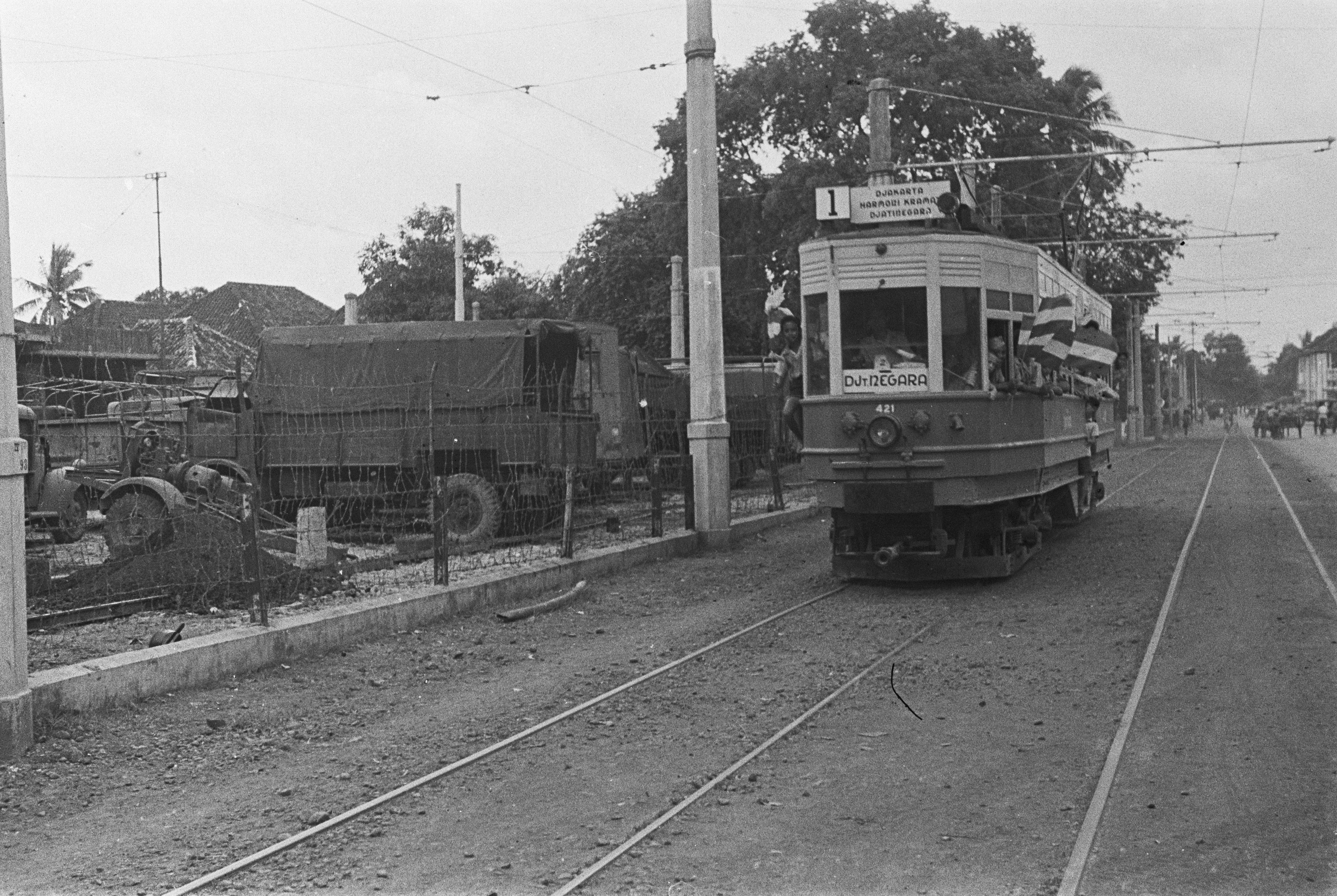
Tram in 1947

== Route ==
Here is the Jakarta tram service schedule as of June 1, 1948

Train No.	Destination	Train type	Time between	Last departure
1	Jakarta Kota–Jatinegara	2 trains and pikolanwagen	Every 9 minutes	00.09
2	Menteng–Pasar Ikan (Amsterdamschepoort)	1 train	Every 15 minutes	23.45
3	Kramat–Jakarta Kota	1 train	Every 15 minutes	23.55
4	Tanah Abang–Jakarta Kota	1 train and pikolanwagen	Every 10 minutes	23.58
5	Tanah Abang Market–Industrie	1 train	Every 12 minutes	23.13
6	Asemka–Jembatan Lima	1 train	?	

== Rolling stock ==
The list provides only steam-tram rolling stock of Batavia until the year 1924. The list is sorted by its year.

Type	Manufacturer	Year	Quantity	NITM number	Seats capacity	Standing capacity	Picture	Remarks
Trailer	Bonnefond	1869	unknown	unknown	40	unknown		Horse-drawn (3-4 horses), 1188mm gauge
Fireless locomotive	Hohenzollern	1882-1883	21	1-21	not applicable	not applicable		1188mm gauge
Fireless locomotive	Hohenzollern	1884-1907	13	22-34	not applicable	not applicable		1188mm gauge
Steam locomotive	Hohenzollern	1921	17	51-67	not applicable	not applicable		1067mm gauge
Trailer type A	Beynes	1882	14	1-14	16	16		Became BVM A1-A14
Trailer type B	Beynes	1882	14	51-64	26	16		52 & 55 became type A 80 & 81 in 1925. 23 survivors became BVM B101-B123
Trailer type A	Beynes	1882-1889	9	91-99	24	16		
Trailer type B	Beynes	1882-1889	7	101-107	34	16		Became BVM AB201-AB207
Trailer type B	Beynes	1883	2	151, 152	40	16		Became BVM AB208, AB209
Trailer type AB	Beynes	1884	2	202, 202	40	16		
Trailer type c\C	Beynes	1887-1897	14	251-264	40	28		Became BVM AB208, AB209
Trailer type AB	Beynes	1897	2	211, 212	40	16		
Trailer type AB	NITM	1904	6	221-226	40	20		Became BVM AB253, AB254, AB256, C505, C506, C508
Pikolanwagen	Werkspoor	1904-1924	28	1-28	not applicable	not applicable		23 survivors became P1-P23
Trailer type C	NITM	1908-1810	7	271-277	40	28		274, 275 & 277 became type AB 231–233 in 1928. Later became 501, 507 & 508.
Trailer type AB	Werkspoor	1922-1923	21	301-321	36	28		Became BVM AB301-AB318, C422-C424
Trailer type C	Werkspoor	1922-1923	21	401-421	42	53		Became BVM C401-C421

== Class ==
The tram line is divided into three classes, namely class 1, class 2 and class 3. This last class is intended for the native population which is generally only shaped like an open tub or called pikolanwagen, this facility is used to transport fish, vegetables, fruits and the like. The average passenger usually consists of class 1 as much as 15%, while the rest are for classes 2 and 3.

== In popular culture ==
In the film Asrama Dara (1958), the Jakarta tram is the background for the song "Trem and Bus Kota" sung by Aminah Tjendrakasih.

== Gallery ==
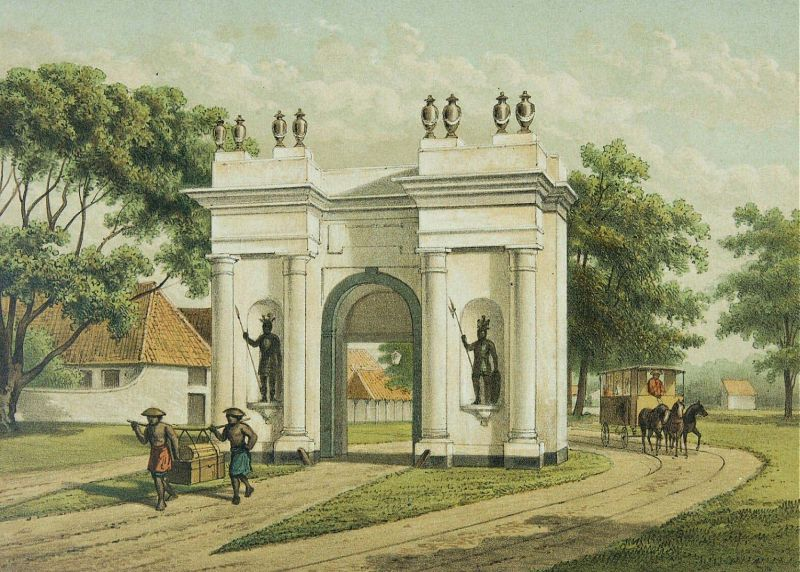
A horse tram passing Batavia's Amsterdam Gate in 1880.

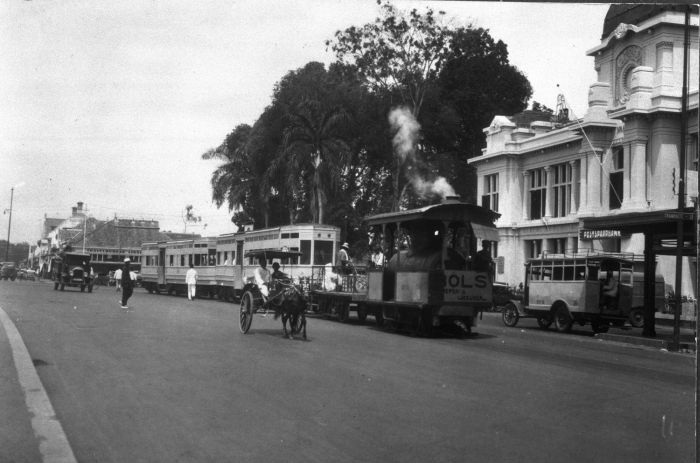
The steam tram in front of the Postspaarbank showing trams for three divided social classes.

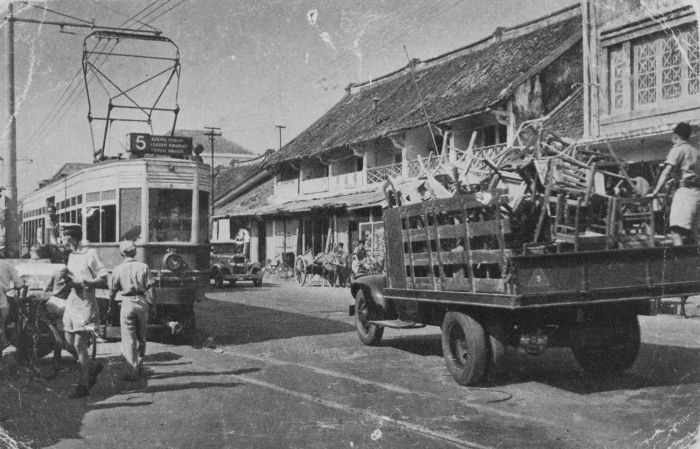
An electric tram in the Kramat – Tanah Abang tram route.

The overflowing tram in Jakarta year 1946.

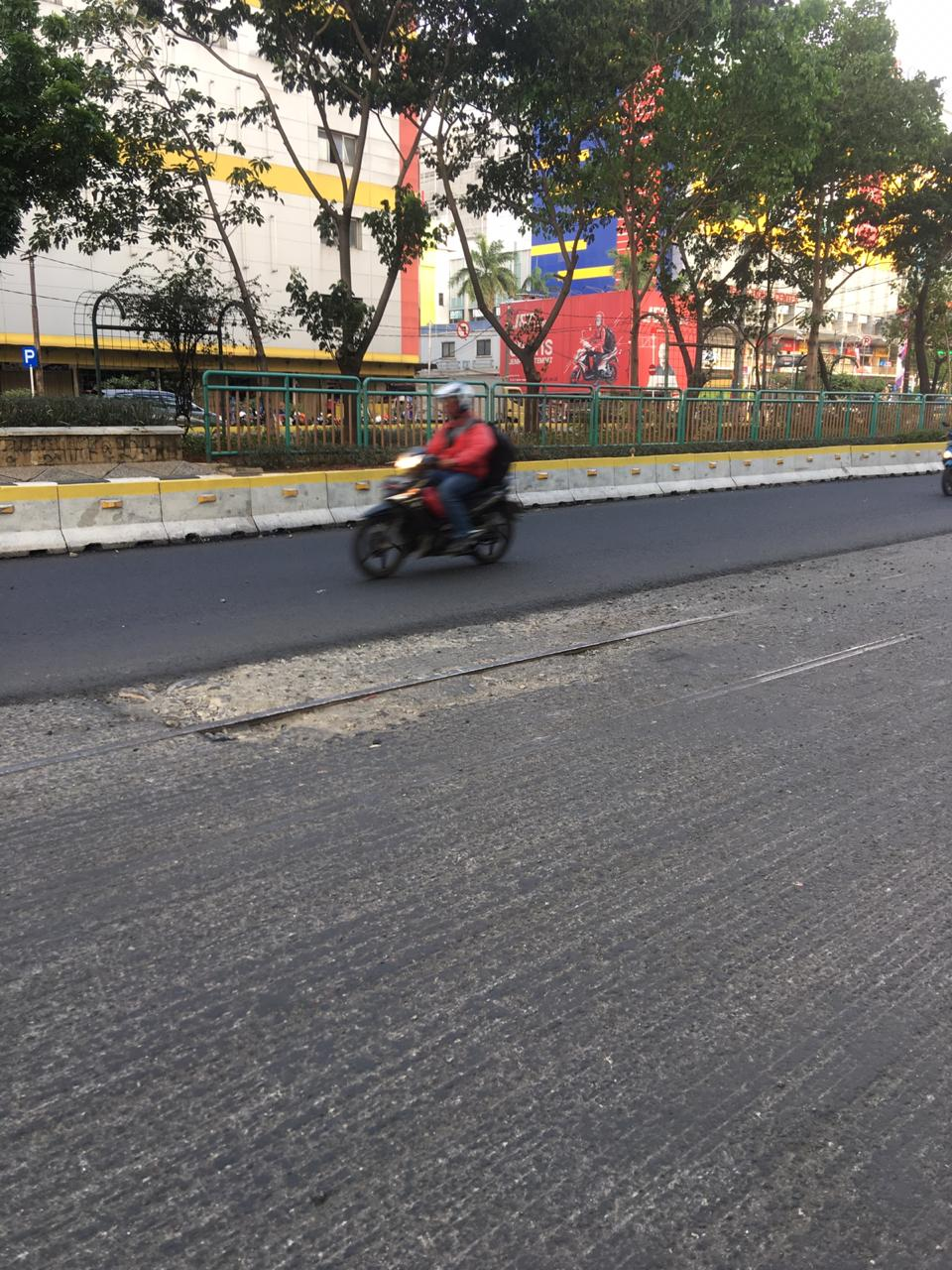
The remains of the former Jakarta tram tracks in Glodok.

== See also ==
- Transport in Jakarta
- Trams in Surabaya, another former tram system in Indonesia

== Cited works ==
- Dick, Howard; Rimmer, Peter J. (2003). Cities, Transport and Communications - The Integration of Southeast Asia since 1850. Palgrave Macmillan. ISBN 9781349390229.
- Duparc, H.J.A. (1972). Trams en Tramlijnen: De Elektrische Stadstrams op Java. Rotterdam: Wyt. ISBN 9789060075821.
- Merrillees, Scott (2015). Jakarta: Portraits of a Capital 1950-1980. Jakarta: Equinox Publishing. ISBN 9786028397308.
- Sulaeman, Adriansyah Yasin (2017). Trem Batavia, Mutiara Transportasi Jakarta Yang Terlupakan [Batavian Tram, The Forgotten Pearl of Jakarta's Transportation]. Breda: Issuu.
- Teeuwen, Dirk (2010). "From horsepower to electrification - Tramways in Batavia-Jakarta 1869-1962" (PDF). Rendez-vous Batavia. Indonesia-Dutch Colonial Heritage.
