= Oost-Java Stoomtram Maatschappij =

Former tram system in Surabaya, Indonesia

Oost-Java Stoomtram Maatschappij N.V.

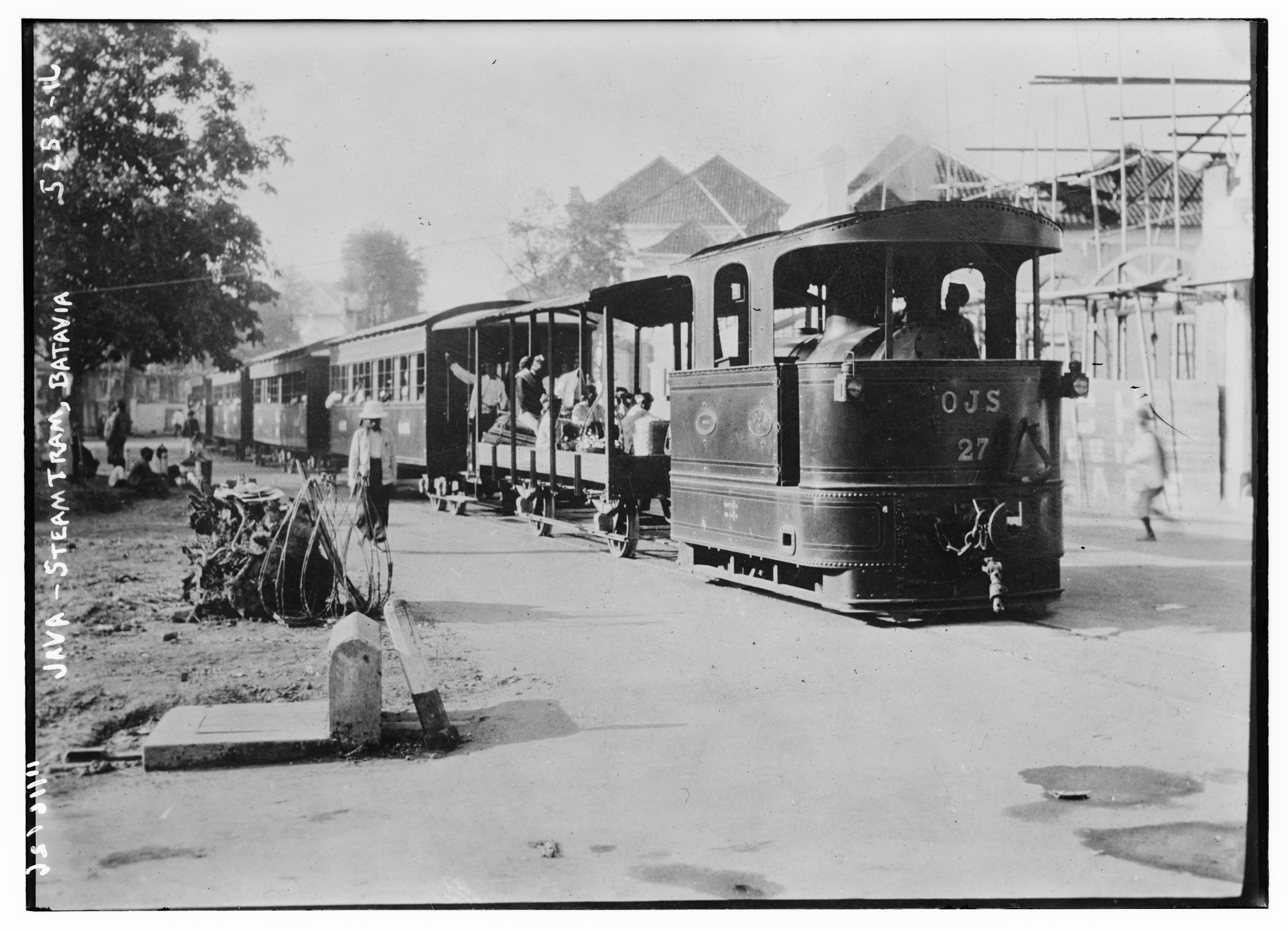
- OJS No. 27 Locomotive in Batavia

Overview
- Area served: Surabaya, Sidoarjo, Mojokerto, Jombang
- Locale: Surabaya
- Transit type: Tram
- Number of lines: 2 (1 defunct)
- Number of stations: 46
- Headquarters: (Netherlands) Wonokromo, Surabaya; Dutch East Indies

Operation
- Began operation: 1889
- Ended operation: 1959
- Operator: Kereta Api Indonesia (Successor)

Technical
- System length: 107 kilometres (66 mi)
- Track gauge: 1,067 mm (3 ft 6 in)
- Top speed: 20–40 km/h (12–25 mph)

Oost-Java Stoomtram Maatschappij (OJS), lit. 'East Java Steam Tram Company' is the name of a private railway company which once operated in Surabaya, Dutch East Indies. The network had 46 stops with a total of near 66 miles (107 km) track; prior to its demise, it operated between the cities of Surabaya and Sidoarjo, Mojokerto Regency and Jombang Regency, on a mixture of former railway lines and urban on-street running.

Currently all OJS railway lines are assets of Kereta Api Indonesia.

== History ==
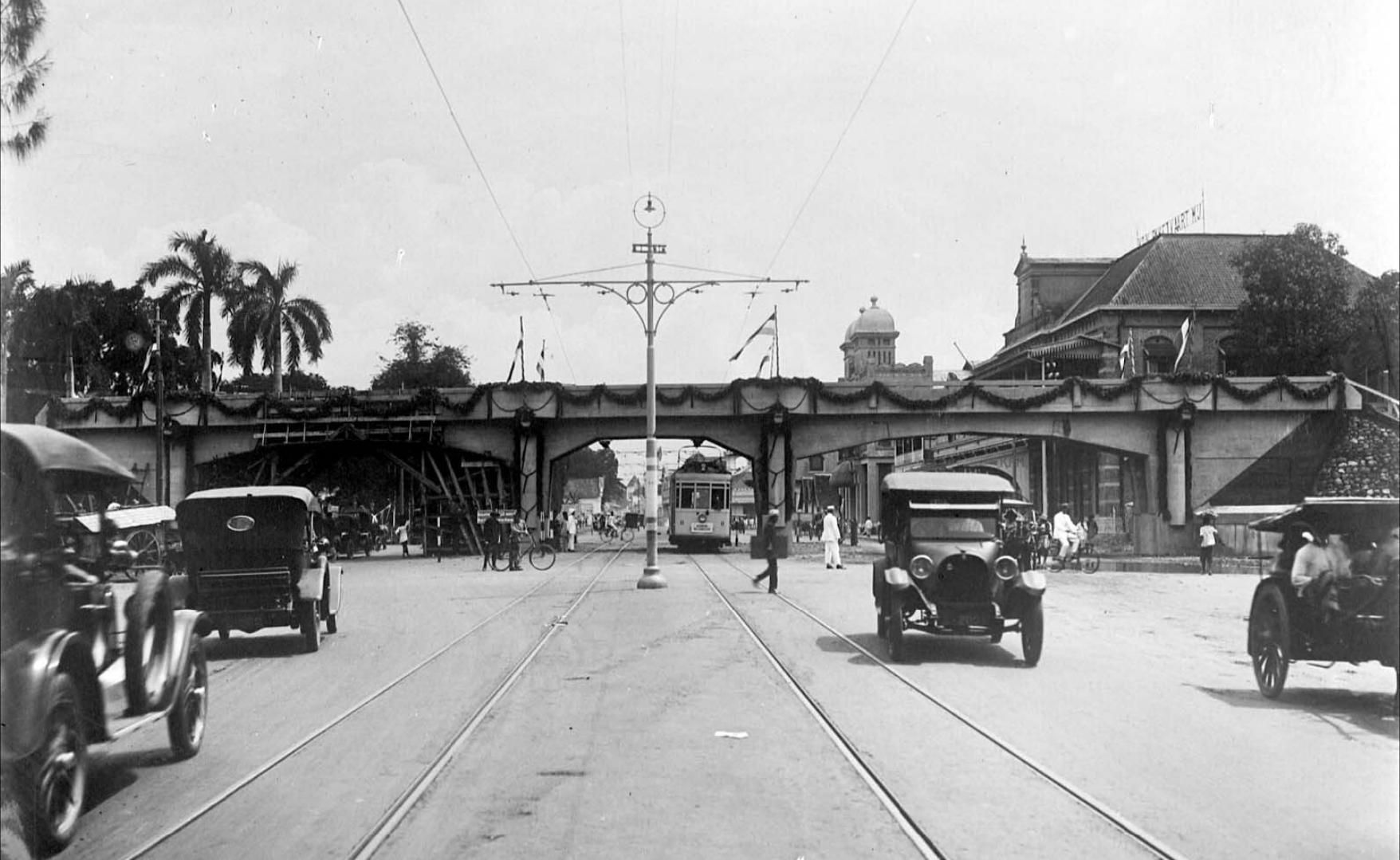
OJS Tram Track in Pasar Besar Weg

The history of the Oost-Java Stoomtram Maatschappij originated in 1886 when the OJS received a concession permit from the Dutch East Indies Colonial Government. OJS then builtsteam locomotive lines around the industrial areas of Surabaya and Sidoarjo. Initially the company had planned out 3 capital sectors, Ujung–Sepanjang–Krian, Mojokerto–Gemekan–Ngoro, and Gemekan–Dinoyo.

On 14 May 1890, OJS opened a new station in Wonokromo, Surabaya, called Wonokromo OJS Station or Wonokromo Kota (not to be confused with Staatsspoorwegen's Wonokromo Station). With intermodal interaction between Staatsspoorwegen and OJS becoming increasingly satisfactory, tram usage in Surabaya increased.

In 1911, OJS expanded its network to cover almost the entire city of Surabaya. OJS then introduced electric powered tram when its track length had just reached 36 km and began operation on 15 May 1923. With more and more people using the city's tramline, the main line was getting completely overhauled with route that previously passed along the banks of Mas River finally diverted through the city center, passing Pasar Turi and Sawahan, which follows the main road at the city center, Jalan Pangeran Diponegoro. The old route was removed only as far as Groedo Station.

To support operations, a tram depot and electric power station were built in Sawahan. The power station was used to provide currents to electric trams around Surabaya and was built in 1925 with 2 Siemens Suckert & Walschke motor generators, each of which had a power of 500 KW - 600 volts DC. This 600 volt DC overhead power network covered the Tanjung Perak–Jembatan Merah–Genteng Besar–Sawahan–Gubeng–Wonokromo Kota route.

As of 1927, it was recorded that 11.4 million passengers were transported by electric tram and 5.2 million people were transported by the OJS steam tram.

=== Construction History ===
In its history, OJS has been recorded to have operated its trams in Mojokerto and Surabaya.

==== Lines in Surabaya ====
First Period (Steam locomotive)

Lines	Segments	Legality	Inaugurated	Keterangan
Ujung-Krian	Ujung–Fort Prins Hendrik	Gouvernments Besluit van 24 October 1886 No. 2/c	10 December 1889	In the 1905 map, this route passes along the banks of Mas River at Surabaya. Parts of the track was dismantled simultaneously with the relocation of the track from the edge of Mas to the centre of the city and the inauguration of the electric tram, except in the direction of Groedo, survived until the Japanese occupation of the Dutch East Indies.
Ujung-Krian	Fort Prins Hendrik–Staatsspoorweg Station	Gouvernments Besluit van 24 October 1886 No. 2/c	17 December 1890	In the 1905 map, this route passes along the banks of Mas River at Surabaya. Parts of the track was dismantled simultaneously with the relocation of the track from the edge of Mas to the centre of the city and the inauguration of the electric tram, except in the direction of Groedo, survived until the Japanese occupation of the Dutch East Indies.
Ujung-Krian	Stadtstuin–Willemplein–Kalimas	Gouvernments Besluit van 24 October 1886 No. 2/c	1 Juni 1897	In the 1905 map, this route passes along the banks of Mas River at Surabaya. Parts of the track was dismantled simultaneously with the relocation of the track from the edge of Mas to the centre of the city and the inauguration of the electric tram, except in the direction of Groedo, survived until the Japanese occupation of the Dutch East Indies.
Ujung-Krian	Staatsspoorweg Station–Telefoonkantoor (with branches to Simpang)	Gouvernments Besluit van 24 October 1886 No. 2/c	15 April 1890	In the 1905 map, this route passes along the banks of Mas River at Surabaya. Parts of the track was dismantled simultaneously with the relocation of the track from the edge of Mas to the centre of the city and the inauguration of the electric tram, except in the direction of Groedo, survived until the Japanese occupation of the Dutch East Indies.
Ujung-Krian	Telefoonkantoor–Groedo Station	Gouvernments Besluit van 24 October 1886 No. 2/c	15 April 1890	In the 1905 map, this route passes along the banks of Mas River at Surabaya. Parts of the track was dismantled simultaneously with the relocation of the track from the edge of Mas to the centre of the city and the inauguration of the electric tram, except in the direction of Groedo, survived until the Japanese occupation of the Dutch East Indies.
Ujung-Krian	Groedo Station–Wonokromo Kota	Gouvernments Besluit van 24 October 1886 No. 2/c	14 Mei 1890	In the 1905 map, this route passes along the banks of Mas River at Surabaya. Parts of the track was dismantled simultaneously with the relocation of the track from the edge of Mas to the centre of the city and the inauguration of the electric tram, except in the direction of Groedo, survived until the Japanese occupation of the Dutch East Indies.
Ujung-Krian	Wonokromo Kota–Sepanjang OJS	Gouvernments Besluit van 24 October 1886 No. 2/c	27 September 1890	
Ujung-Krian	Sepanjang OJS–Krian	Gouvernments Besluit 19 October 1895 No. 6	14 Februari 1898	
Ujung-Krian	Regentstraat–Pasarturi–Wonokromo	Art. 2 Gouvernments Besluit 6 Januari 1913 No. 33	2 Maret 1916	This route was a relocation of the route which was originally located on the banks of Mas River

Second Period (Electric powered tram)

Segments	Legality	Inauguration	Length (km)	Annotation
Regentstraat–Tandjoeng Perak	Gouvernments Besluit 25 November 1915 No. 56	1 Agustus 1920	16	A number of tram lines were double track
Wonokromo–Willemsplein	Gouvernments Besluit 25 November 1915 No. 56	15 Mei 1923	8,4	A number of tram lines were double track
Kayoon–Hoek Palmenlaan	Gouvernments Besluit 25 November 1915 No. 56	16 Mei 1923	1	A number of tram lines were double track
Sawahan (tram depot)–Toenjoengan	Gouvernments Besluit 25 November 1915 No. 56	16 Mei 1923	3	A number of tram lines were double track
Willemsplein–Tandjoeng Perak	Gouvernments Besluit 25 November 1915 No. 56	12 Juli 1923	5	A number of tram lines were double track
Kayoon–Surabaya Goebeng–Kampung Goebeng	Gouvernments Besluit 25 November 1915 No. 56	11 Februari 1924	2	A number of tram lines were double track

==== Lines in Mojokerto ====
Lines	Segments	Legality	Inauguration	Length (km)	Annotation
Pabrik Spiritus Wates–Mojokerto Kota–Gemekan	SF Kapettengan (SF Sentanen Lor)/Mojokerto Kali–Mojoagung	Gouvernments Besluit 11 Mei 1887 No. 8/c	1 Oktober 1889	17	
Pabrik Spiritus Wates–Mojokerto Kota–Gemekan	Mojokerto Kali-Wates	Gouvernments Besluit 25 Mei 1909 No. 37	1 April 1909	3	
Gemekan-Ngoro	Mojoagung–Ngoro	Gouvernments Besluit 11 Mei 1887 No. 8/c	1 Januari 1890	17	
Gemekan-Dinoyo	Gemekan-Dinoyo	Gouvernments Besluit 31 Mei 1890 No. 7	5 Maret 1892	8	

=== Post-Independence ===
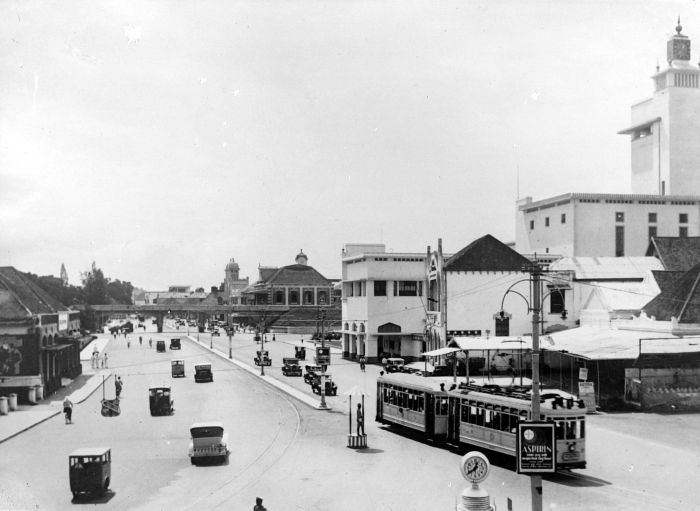
OJS Tram passing along Hogeweg, Soerabaja's colonial central business district

In 1959, President Sukarno issued a Government Regulation No. 40 of 1959, which included, the nationalisation of all railway lines and steam locomotives which were previously operated by Dutch-owned companies, whose operations were handed over to the Djawatan Kereta Api Republik Indonesia (DKA), which included the ex-OJS route.

In 1968–1969, electric trams were discontinued and overhead power cable covering the tram line were removed with some of its branch lines also ceasing to operate.

A Kereta Api Indonesia spokesperson said that with a fare of 15 cents for class I and 10 cents for class II, it would not be viable to save Surabaya's trams from extinction. Since the 1970s, Surabaya's trams were declared non-operating because they were unable to compete with private cars and public transportation as well as the large number of illegal passengers which caused PJKA revenue to plunge. With the closure of the Surabaya steam tram in 1978, the history of the Surabaya tram ended.

The reactivation of the Surabaya Tram is included in the priority list carried out by the Ministry of Transportation in collaboration with PT KAI and the Surabaya City Government. However, there are no signs that this route will be implemented soon.
