= Wonokromo =

Wonokromo Kecamatan Wonokromo
- District
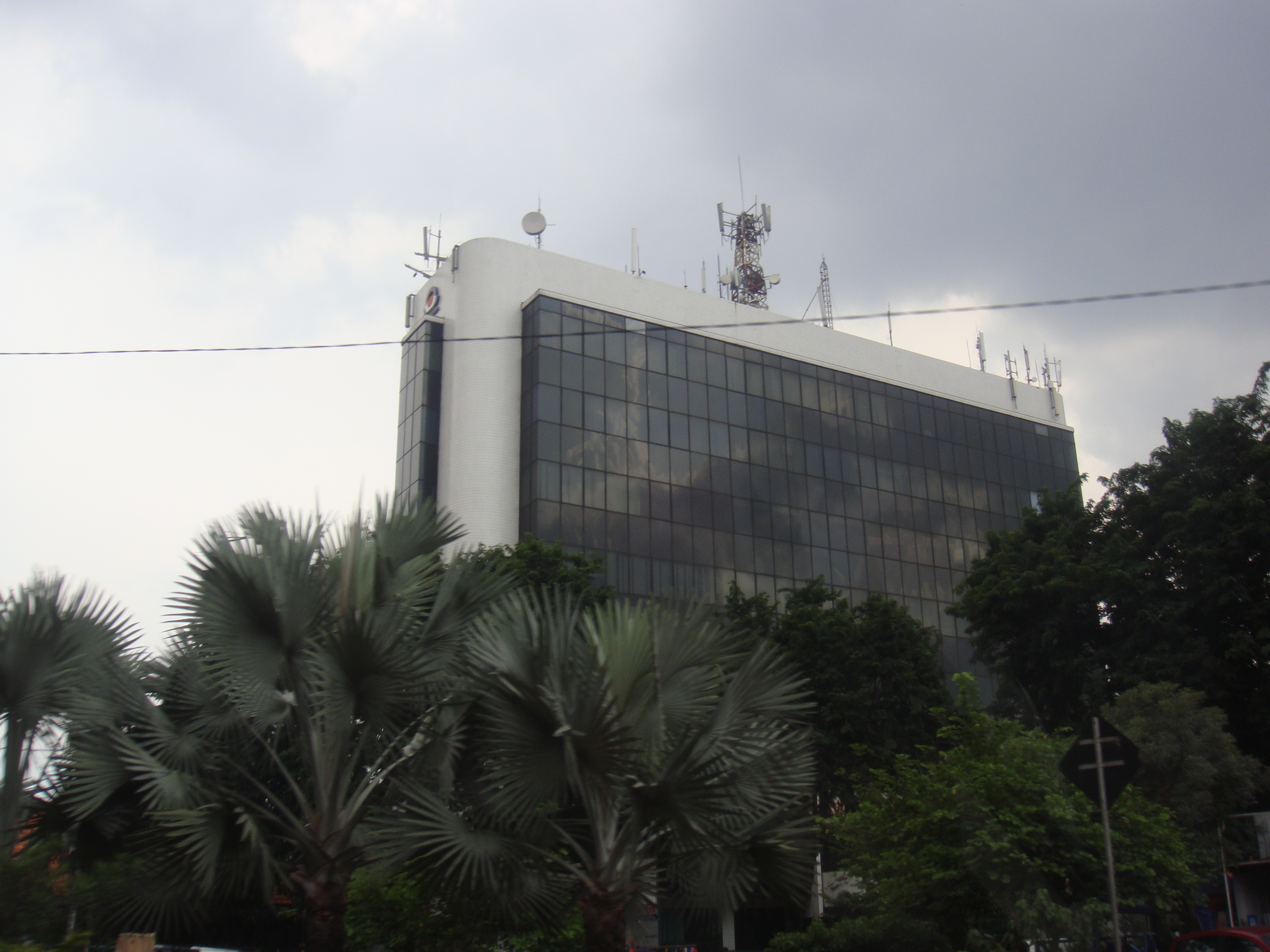
- Graha Bumiputera Wonokromo

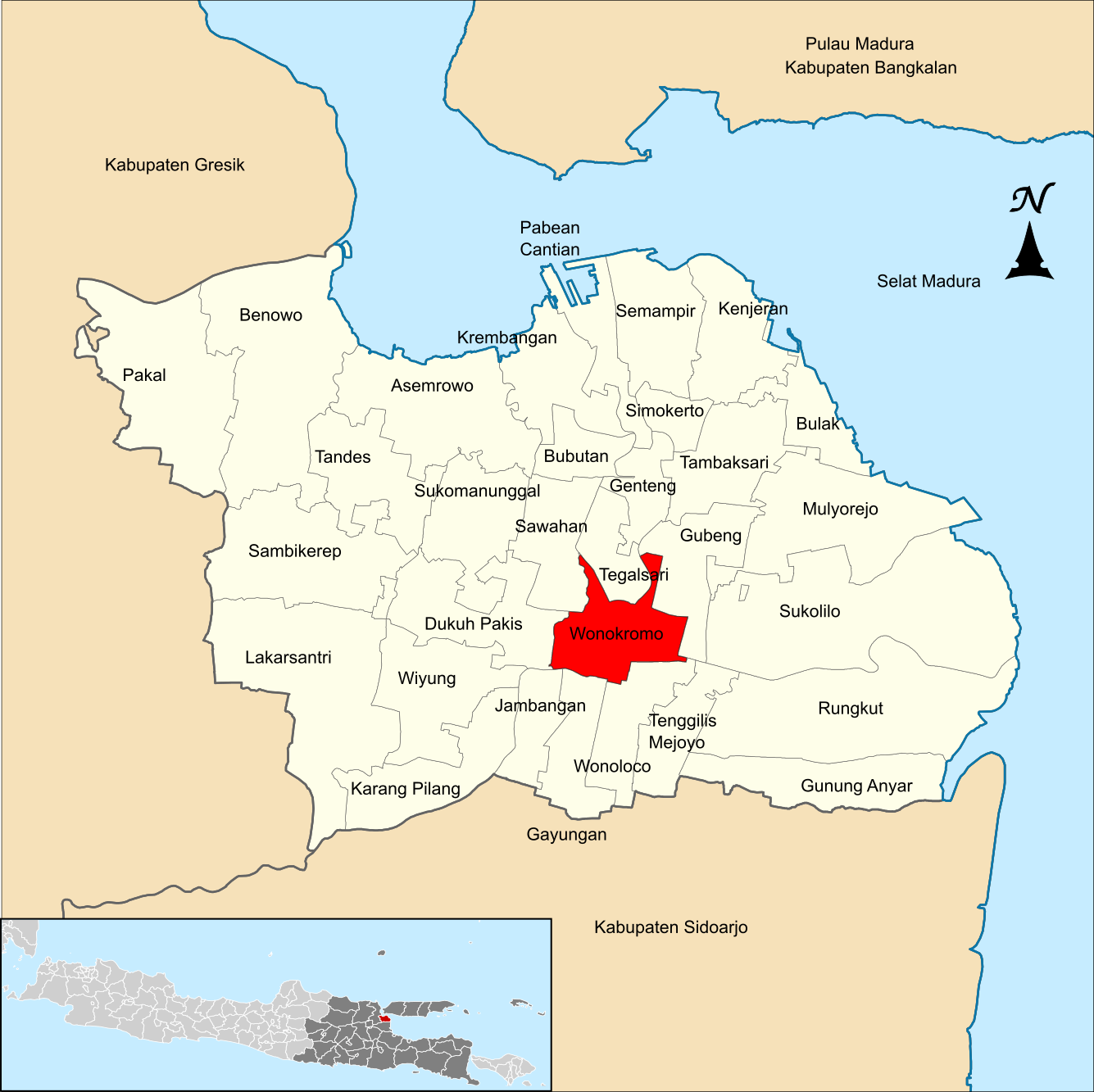
- Map of Wonokromo in Surabaya
- Interactive map outlining Wonokromo
- Coordinates: 7.30032°S 112.737509°E
- Country: Indonesia
- Province: East Java
- City: Surabaya

Area
  - Total: 8.26 km^{2} (3.19 sq mi)
- BPS

Population (mid 2024 estimate)
  - Total: 153,563
  - Density: 18,600/km^{2} (48,200/sq mi)
- Time zone: GMT +7

Wonokromo is an administrative district (kecamatan) in the city of Surabaya, Indonesia. The Wonokromo railway station serves the area. The Kalimas River originally turned north and empties into the Tanjung Perak and Kali Jagir, a manmade branch of the river that connects east to the sea and includes a dam built by the Dutch. The area is also home to DTC (Darmo Trade Center) formerly the Wonokromo Market.

== Administrative divisions ==
Wonokromo is divided into 6 administrative villages (kelurahan):

- Ngagel
- Ngagelrejo
- Darmo
- Sawunggaling
- Wonokromo
- Jagir

== Gallery ==
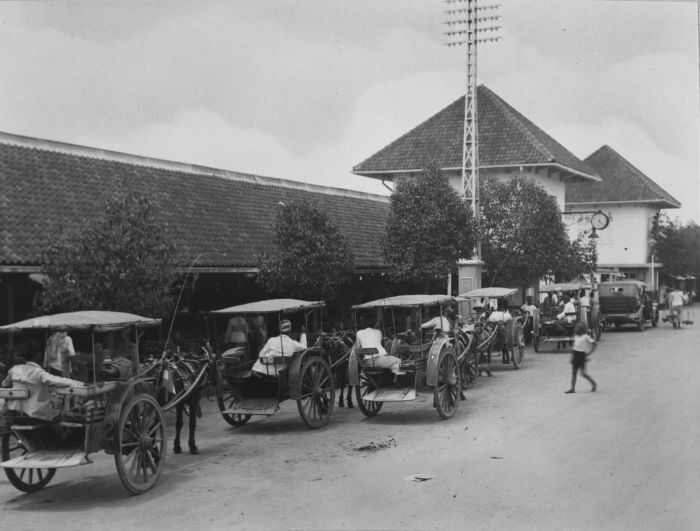
Wonokromo Market circa 1930s

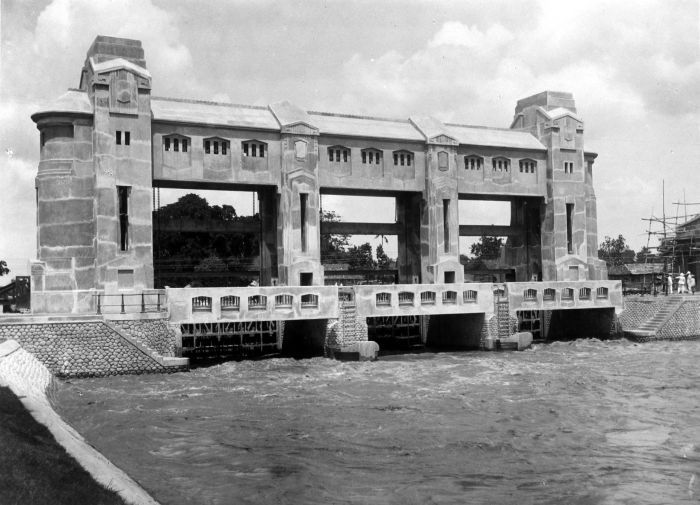
Wonokromo Lock circa 1930s

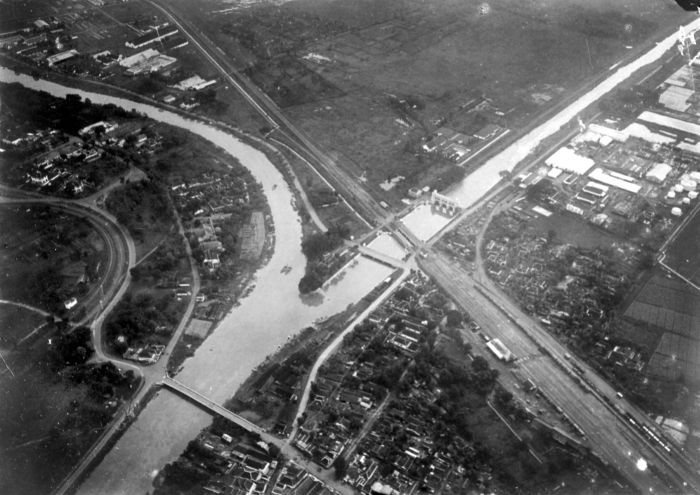
Kali Jagir, Wonokromo aerial circa 1920s

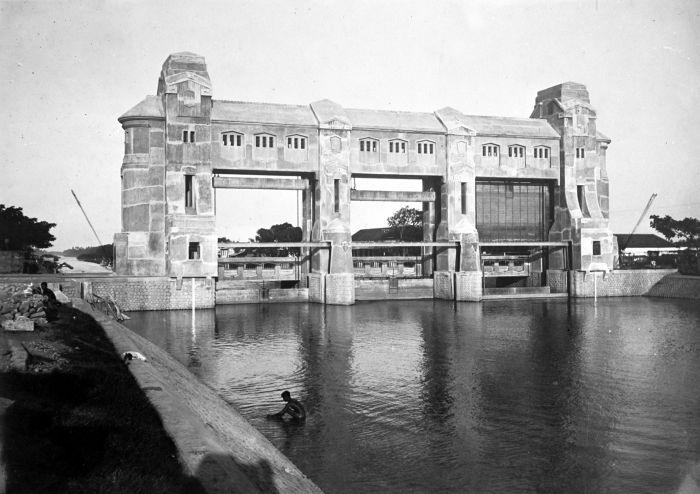
Wonokromo Lock

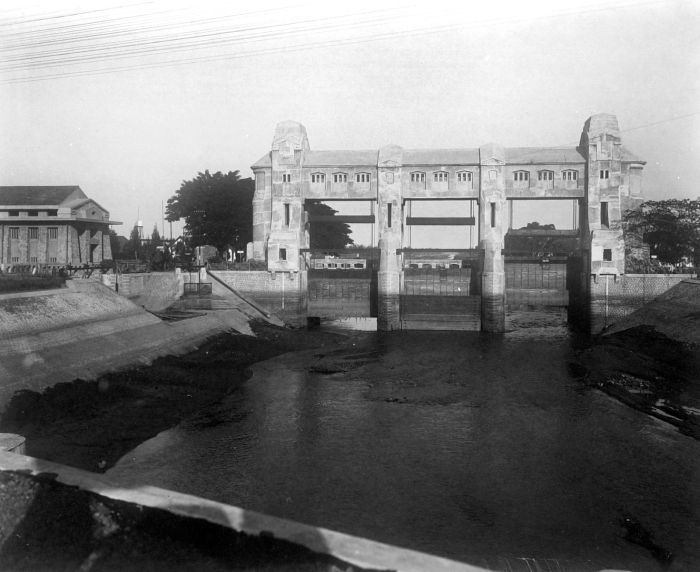
Bandjirsluis

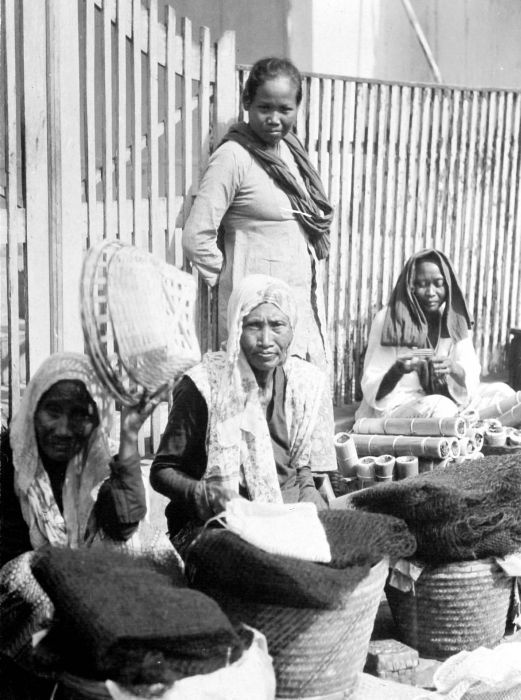
Women at the Wonokromo Market

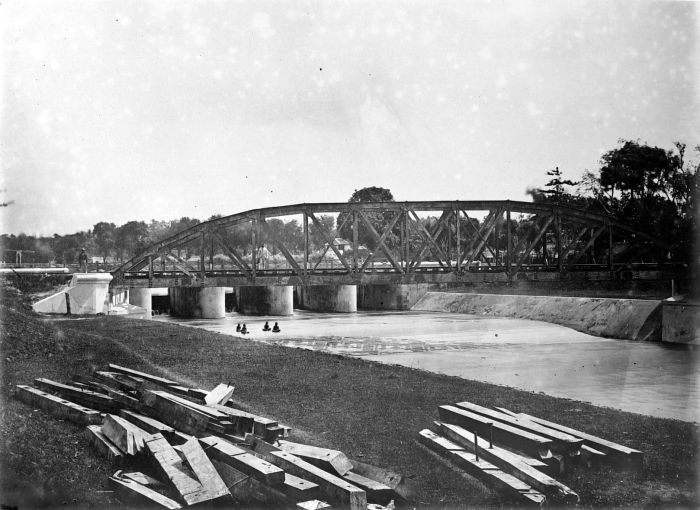
Wonokromo Bridge

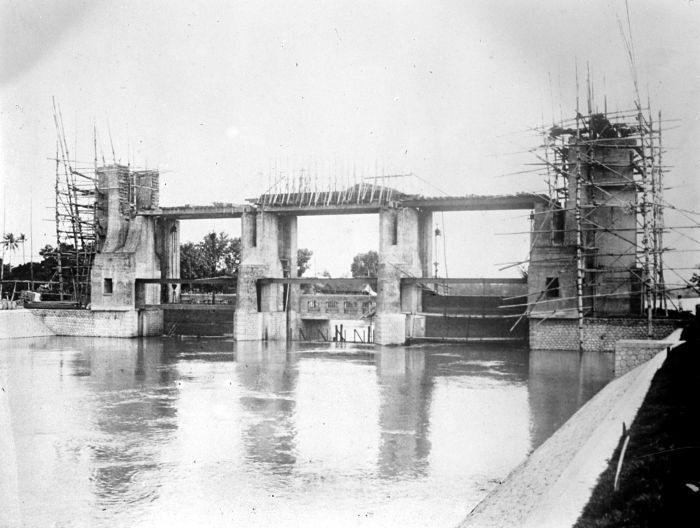
Wonokromo lock construction early 1920s

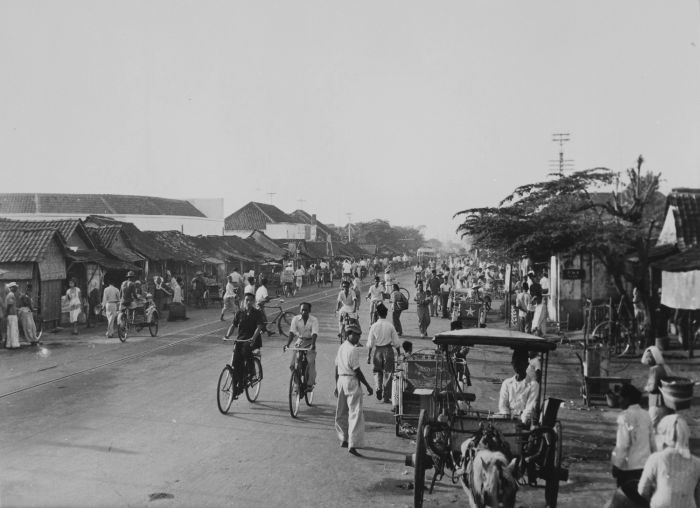
Wonokromo Market
