= Mas River =

River in East Java

Coordinates: 7°14′12.22″S 112°44′17.72″E

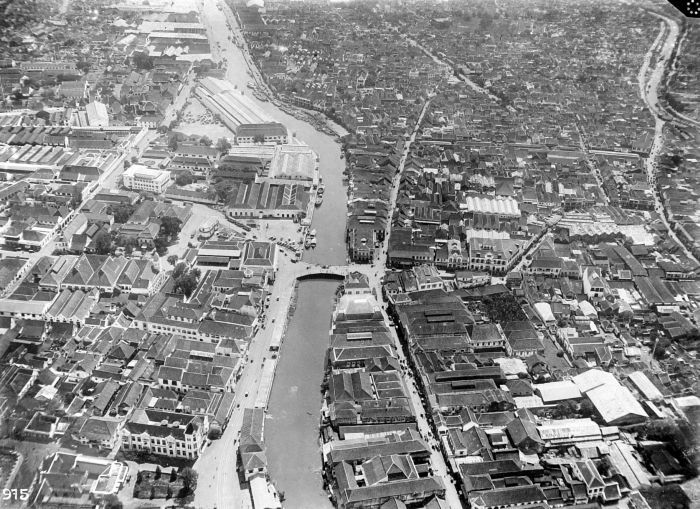
Aerial view of the Kali Mas running through Surabaya. The Red Bridge is in the middle.

The Kali Mas ("Golden River" in Javanese), also known as Kali Surabaya, is a distributary of the Brantas River in East Java, flowing north-easterly towards the Madura Strait. This river also forms part of the border between the Sidoarjo and Gresik regencies of East Java, Indonesia.

== History ==
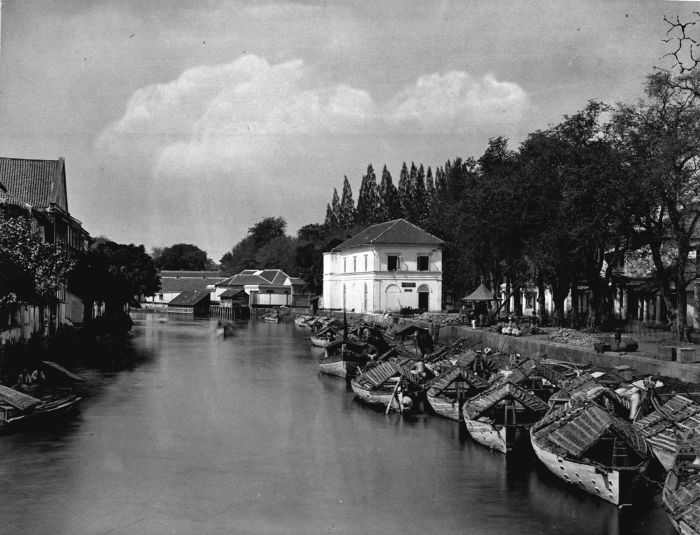
Boats on the Kali Mas at "Willemskade" in the late 19th century

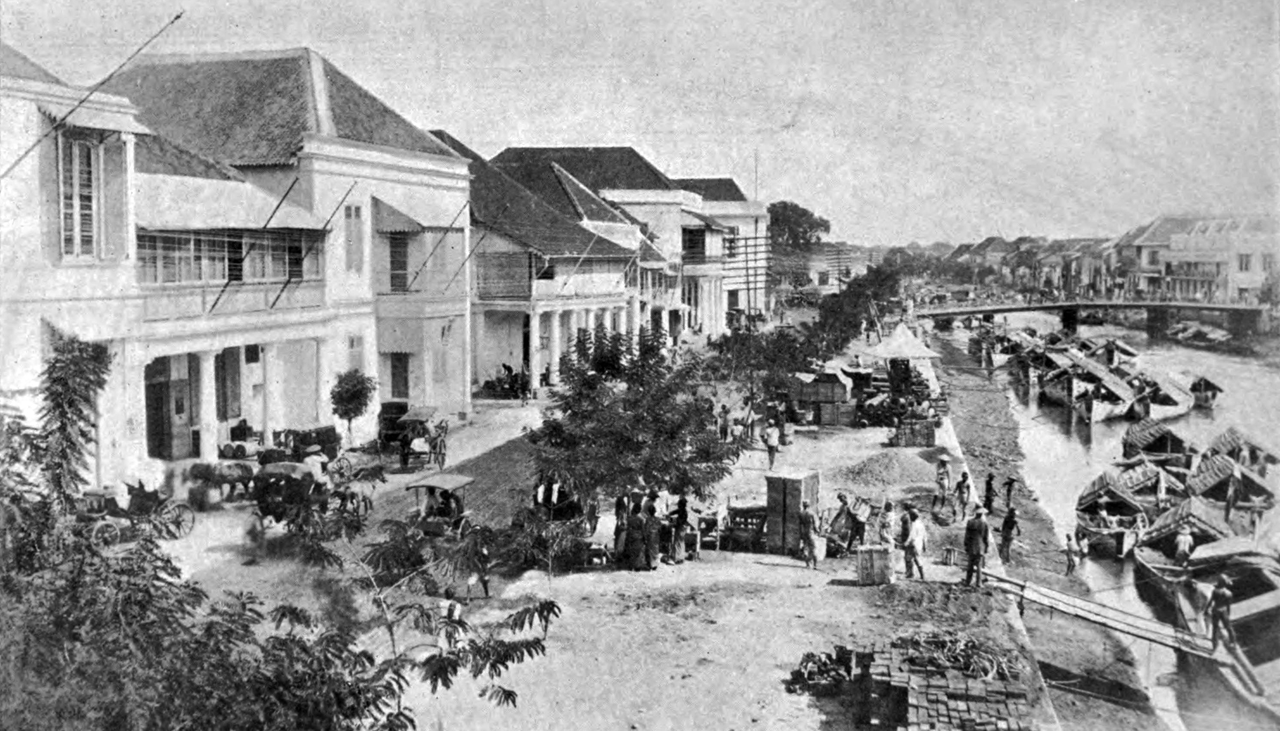
The Kali Mas in Surabaya circa 1900

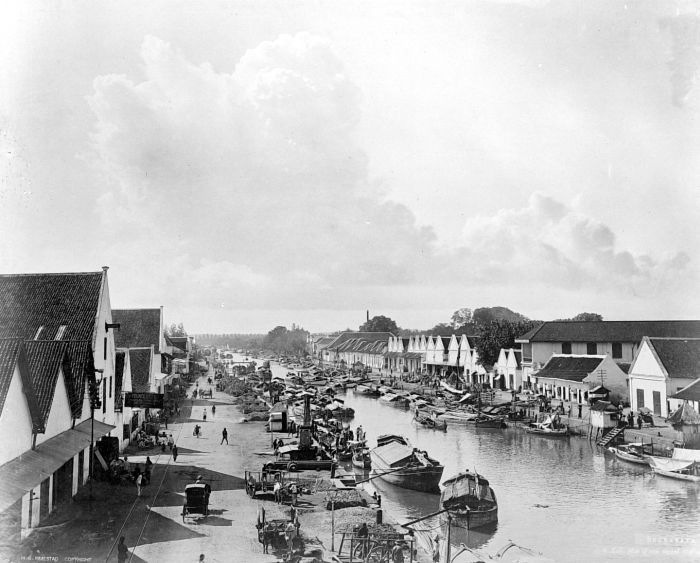
The Kali Mas in Surabaya, in the early 20th century.

The port city of Surabaya is built along the river. The old Surabaya harbour, built centuries ago, is located near the river mouth. At one point in time, this was an entry port to the Kingdom of Majapahit, and it is also here that the founder of the Majapahit empire (Raden Wijaya) fought off a Mongol invasion in 1293.

During the times of the Dutch East Indies, this river was heavily utilized as a goods transport route. Large trade ships unload commodity goods at the Strait of Madura, where smaller ships take over and distribute the trade goods inland. The Kali Mas harbour was built to facilitate such trade. The areas along Kali Mas were split into two, which are called Westerkade Kalimas (west of Kali Mas) dan Oosterkade Kalimas (east of Kali Mas), and in the local dialect are known as Kulon Kali and Wetan Kali respectively. The areas east of the river were developed for trade and commercial activities. These include Kembang Jepun, Cantikan, Kapasan. The west side includes Gresik Road, Kalisosok, and the area around west Tanjung Perak. With the development of land-based transport river transport along the Kali Mas has largely been diminished.

Due to its long history serving as a major transport route, many historical buildings can be found along the river bank. These include the Kali Mas harbour, old settlements and trading houses along the river banks, as well as the residence of the governor. There is also a collection of old bridges, including the famous historical landmark Jembatan Merah (Roode Brug), as well as a drawbridge (which is no longer operating).

== Current use ==
Following an extensive program to clean up the river and relocate squatters along parts of the river banks, the Surabaya city administration is planning to develop the area for recreation as well as cultural functions. With a budget of 9 Billion Rupiah (approximately US 1 million), 9 areas along the river banks are planned to be revitalized starting from 2008. Water quality improvement programs are also underway, with some assistance from the city of Kitakyushu, Japan. Periodically, live fish are released into the river to improve its ecosystem biodiversity.

Current uses of the river include river cruises, boat racing, and boat carnival. Some trade activity still exists at the Kalimas Harbour.

== Gallery ==
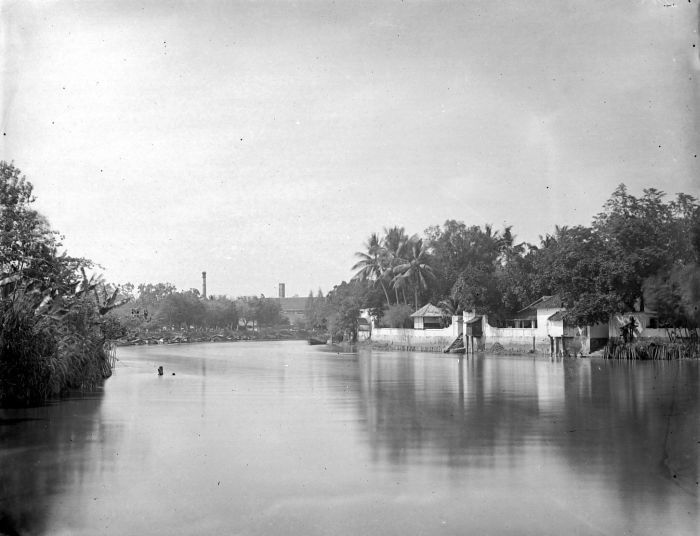

== See also ==
- List of drainage basins of Indonesia
