= List of Kereta Api Indonesia rolling stock classes =

List of rolling stock classes of the Kereta Api Indonesia, its predecessors (Perumka, PJKA, PNKA, DKA), and its subsidiaries (KAI Commuter, Kereta Cepat Indonesia China). All are for 3 ft 6 in gauge railways unless otherwise stated. This list includes both operational and withdrawn classes.

== Steam locomotives ==
=== Operable ===
All of the steam locomotives owned by Kereta Api Indonesia are exclusively used for excursion train services.

Class	Unit number	Image	Axles (AAR)	Axles (Whyte)	Builder	Power (hp)	Year built	Initial use	Status
B25	02 & 03		B-1	0-4-2RT	(German Empire) Maschinenfabrik Esslingen	450	1902	rack railway, branchline	B2502 retired from service in 2020, B2503 remains operable at Ambarawa.
B51	12		2-B	4-4-0	(German Empire) Hanomag	415	1902	mainline, regional	Operable at Ambarawa Railway Museum
C12	18		1-C	2-6-0T	(German Empire) Sächsische Maschinenfabrik	350	1896	shunter, branchline	Stored at Purwosari depot. Pulled out of service in 2020.
D14	10		1-D-1	2-8-2T	(Weimar Republic) Hanomag	1187	1921	mainline, freight	Used for Sepur Kluthuk Jaladara excursion train at Surakarta
D52	099		1-D-1	2-8-2	(West Germany) Krupp	1600	1952	mainline	Stored at Purwosari station awaiting restoration
E10	60		E	0-10-0RT	(West Germany) Maschinenfabrik Esslingen	750	1966	mainline, rack railway, freight	Operable at Sawahlunto station, used for Mak Itam excursion train.

== Diesel locomotives ==
In July 2010, the Ministry of Transportation issued Regulation No. KM45/2010, which among other things, renumbered the locomotive unit number. Under the new regulation, the unit number consisted of year of entered service and the unit number of that year (e.g. CC201 78 03 (former CC201 31) denotes that it is the third CC201 that entered service in 1978). Some locomotive classes were wholly retired before 2010 and thus would not receive the new unit number. Locomotives that were manufactured after 2010 exclusively used the new unit number, but for simplicity it would be given the old-style unit number. Certain locomotives has incorrect new unit numbers, mostly CC201s that were rebuilt from BB203s. Some of these numberings are skipped (e.g BB203 78 01 (former BB203 02) and BB203 78 02 (former BB203 05). These skipped numbers were caused by units that were retired or rebuilt before 2010.

=== 3 ft 6 in gauge ===
Diesel–mechanical
Class	Old unit number	2010 unit number	Image	Axles	Builder	Power (hp)	Engine	Entered service	Initial use
B101 (Pelita 1) (id)	01	n/a		1A	(Indonesia) PNKA Yogyakarta workshop	120	Mercedes-Benz OM 352	1969	shunter, experimental
Diesel–electric
Class	Old unit number	2010 unit number	Image	Axles	Builder	Power (hp)	Engine	Entered service	Initial use
A200 (Gajah Mada)	01	n/a		1A	(Indonesia) PNKA Surabaya Gubeng workshop	n/a	n/a	n/a	shunter, experimental
B200 (20TDE)	01-02	n/a		B	(France) Locotracteurs Gaston Moyse	80	n/a	1961	shunter
B200 (Bima Kunting 2)	01	n/a		B	(Indonesia) PNKA Yogyakarta workshop	120	Daimler-Benz M204 B	1965	shunter, experimental
B201 (Bima Kunting 3)	01	n/a		B	(Indonesia) PNKA Yogyakarta workshop	120	Daimler-Benz M204 B	1965	shunter, experimental
BB200 (EMD G8U6)	01-35	57 01- 57 35		A1A-A1A	(United States) EMD	875	EMD 8-567C	1957	mainline
BB201 (EMD G12U6)	01-02	63 01- 63 02		A1A-A1A	(United States) EMD	1310	EMD 12-567C	1963	mainline
BB201 (EMD G12U6)	03-11	64 01- 64 09		A1A-A1A	(United States) EMD	1310	EMD 12-567C	1964	mainline
BB202 (EMD G18U6)	01-03	67 01- 67 03		A1A-A1A	(United States) EMD	1100	EMD 8-645E	1967	mainline
BB202 (EMD G18U6)	04-08	71 01- 71 05		A1A-A1A	(United States) EMD	1100	EMD 8-645E	1971	mainline
BB203 (GE U18A1A)	01-11	78 01 - 78 05 (Note: BB203 no. 04, 07, 09, and 11 has converted to CC201 standard between 1999 and 2000, while BB203 no. 01 and 03 has been written-off because of accident)		A1A-A1A	(United States) GE	1500	GE 7FDL-8	1978	mainline
BB203 (GE U18A1A)	12-59	N/A (Note: Converted to CC201 standard between 1989 - 2004)		A1A-A1A	(United States) GE	1500	GE 7FDL-8	1983-1985	mainline
BB204 (SLM HGm4/6)	01-04	82 01- 82 04		B-2-B	(Switzerland) SLM	1230	MTU 12V 396 TC 12	1982	rack railway, freight, mainline
BB204 (SLM HGm4/6)	05-10	84 01- 84 06		B-2-B	(Switzerland) SLM	1230	MTU 12V 396 TC 12	1984	rack railway, freight, mainline
BB204 (SLM HGm4/6)	11-17	93 01- 93 07		B-2-B	(Switzerland) SLM	1230	MTU 12V 396 TC 12	1993	rack railway, freight, mainline
CC200 (GE-ALCO UM 106T)	01-27	n/a		C-2-C	(United States) GE, ALCO	1750	ALCO 244E	1953	mainline
CC201 (GE U18C)	01-28	77 01- 77 23 (Note: 5 CC201 class locomotives of 1977 batch (no. 03, 06, 11, 12, 16) were converted to CC204 class in 2003, thus the 2010 numbering skipped the converted locomotives. For more detailed list see it here)		C-C	(United States) GE	1950	GE 7FDL-8	1977	mainline
CC201 (GE U18C)	29-38	78 01- 78 06 (Note: 2 CC201 class locomotives of 1978 batch (no. 33 and 35) were written off after an accident in 1981, further two units (no. 32 and 37) were converted to CC204 class in 2003, and thus the 2010 numbering skipped the written off and converted locomotives. For more detailed list see it here)		C-C	(United States) GE	1950	GE 7FDL-8	1978	mainline
CC201 (GE U18C)	39-72	83 01- 83 34		C-C	(United States) GE	1950	GE 7FDL-8	1983	mainline
CC201 (GE U18C)	73R-90R	89 01- 89 17 (Note: CC201 85R were written off after an accident in 1998 and thus the 2010 numbering skipped it. For more detailed list see it here)		C-C	(United States) - (Indonesia) GE, Rebuilt from BB203 by KAI Lahat workshop	1950	GE 7FDL-8	1989	mainline
CC201 (GE U18C)	91-110	92 01- 92 20		C-C	(United States) GE	1950	GE 7FDL-8	1992	mainline
CC201 (GE U18C)	111R-120R	93 01- 93 02; 83 35- 83 42		C-C	(United States) - (Indonesia) GE, Rebuilt from BB203 by KAI Lahat workshop	1950	GE 7FDL-8	1993	mainline
CC201 (GE U18C)	121R-137R	83 43- 83 56 (Note: CC201 121R were written off after an accident in 2005 and thus the 2010 numbering skipped it. For more detailed list see it here); 99 01- 99 02 (Note: 99 01 (former 126R) and 99 02 (former 128R))		C-C	(United States) - (Indonesia) GE, Rebuilt from BB203 by KAI Lahat workshop	1950	GE 7FDL-8	1998	mainline
CC201 (GE U18C)	138R-144R	04 01- 04 07		C-C	(United States) - (Indonesia) GE, Rebuilt from BB203 by KAI Yogyakarta workshop	1950	GE 7FDL-8	2004	mainline
CC202 (EMD G26MC-2U)	01-15	86 01- 86 15		C-C	(Canada) EMD	2250	EMD 16-645E	1986	freight, mainline
CC202 (EMD G26MC-2U)	16-32	90 01- 90 17		C-C	(Canada) EMD	2250	EMD 16-645E	1990	freight, mainline
CC202 (EMD G26MC-2U)	33-34	93 01- 93 02		C-C	(Canada) EMD	2250	EMD 16-645E	1993	freight, mainline
CC202 (EMD G26MC-2U)	35-37	01 01- 01 03		C-C	(Canada) EMD	2250	EMD 16-645E	2001	freight, mainline
CC202 (EMD G26MC-2U)	38-39	02 01- 02 02		C-C	(Canada) EMD	2250	EMD 16-645E	2002	freight, mainline
CC202 (EMD G26MC-2U)	40-48	08 01- 08 09		C-C	(Canada) EMD	2250	EMD 16-645E	2008	freight, mainline
CC203 (GE U20C)	01-12	95 01- 95 12		C-C	(United States) GE	2150	GE 7FDL-8	1995	mainline
CC203 (GE U20C)	13-27	98 01- 98 15		C-C	(United States) - (Indonesia) GE, INKA, GE Lokindo	2150	GE 7FDL-8	1997	mainline
CC203 (GE U20C)	28-30	98 16- 98 18		C-C	(United States) - (Indonesia) GE, INKA, GE Lokindo	2150	GE 7FDL-8	1998	mainline
CC203 (GE U20C)	31-34	01 01- 01 04		C-C	(United States) - (Indonesia) GE, INKA, GE Lokindo	2150	GE 7FDL-8	1999	freight, mainline. Owned by paper pulp company PT Tanjungenim Lestari Pulp and Paper
CC203 (GE U20C)	35-37	01 05- 01 07		C-C	(United States) - (Indonesia) GE, INKA, GE Lokindo	2150	GE 7FDL-8	2000	mainline
CC203 (GE U20C)	38-41	02 01- 02 04		C-C	(United States) - (Indonesia) GE, INKA, GE Lokindo	2150	GE 7FDL-8	2002	mainline
CC204 (GE C18MMi)	01-04	03 01- 03 04		C-C	(United States) - (Indonesia) GE, Rebuilt from CC201 by KAI Yogyakarta workshop	1950	GE 7FDL-8	2003	mainline
CC204 (GE C18MMi)	05-07	03 05- 03 07		C-C	(United States) - (Indonesia) GE, Rebuilt from CC201 by KAI Yogyakarta workshop	1950	GE 7FDL-8	2005	mainline
CC204 (GE C20EMP)	08-09	06 01- 06 02		C-C	(United States) - (Indonesia) GETI	2150	GE 7FDL-8	2006	freight, mainline
CC204 (GE C20EMP)	10-11	07 01- 07 02		C-C	(United States) - (Indonesia) GETI	2150	GE 7FDL-8	2007	freight, mainline
CC204 (GE C20EMP)	12-13	08 01- 08 02		C-C	(United States) - (Indonesia) GETI	2150	GE 7FDL-8	2008	freight, mainline
CC204 (GE C20EMP)	14-17	09 01- 09 04		C-C	(United States) - (Indonesia) GETI	2150	GE 7FDL-8	2009	freight, mainline
CC204 (GE C20EMP)	18-20	10 01- 10 03		C-C	(United States) - (Indonesia) GETI	2150	GE 7FDL-8	2010	freight, mainline
CC204 (GE C20EMP)	21-37	11 01- 11 17		C-C	(United States) - (Indonesia) GETI	2150	GE 7FDL-8	2011	freight, mainline
CC205 (EMD GT38ACe)	01-06	11 01- 11 06		C-C	(Canada) EMD	2250	EMD 8-710G3A	2011	freight, mainline
CC205 (EMD GT38ACe)	07-50	13 01- 13 44		C-C	(United States) EMD	2250	EMD 8-710G3A	2013	freight, mainline
CC205 (EMD GT38ACe)	51-55	14 01- 14 05		C-C	(United States) EMD	2250	EMD 8-710G3A	2014	freight, mainline
CC205 (EMD GT38ACe)	56-79	21 01- 21 24		C-C	(United States) EMD	2250	EMD 8-710G3A	2021	freight, mainline
CC205 (EMD GT38ACe)	80-91	21 25- 21 36		C-C	(United States) EMD	2250	EMD 8-710G3A	2021	freight, mainline
CC206 (GE CM20EMP)	01-100	13 01- 13 100		C-C	(United States) GE	2250	GE 7FDL-8	2013	freight, mainline
CC206 (GE CM20EMP)	101-139	15 01- 15 39		C-C	(United States) GE	2250	GE 7FDL-8	2015	freight, mainline
CC206 (GE CM20EMP)	140-150	16 01- 16 11		C-C	(United States) GE	2250	GE 7FDL-8	2016	freight, mainline
Diesel–hydraulic
Class	Old unit number	2010 unit number	Image	Axles	Builder	Power (hp)	Engine	Entered service	Initial use
Kebo Kuning (Schöma 6WDM)	01-02	n/a		C	(West Germany) Schöma	100	Daimler-Benz M204 B	1963	shunter
B301	n/a	23 01- 23 02		B	(Indonesia) INKA	n/a	n/a	2023	shunter. Owned by KAI Commuter.
C300 (LKM V30C)	01-20	n/a		C	(East Germany) VEB Lokomotivbau Karl Marx	330	Maybach Mercedes-Benz 836 B	1967	shunter, branchline
D300 (Krupp M350D1)	01-30	58 01- 58 30		D	(West Germany) Krupp (Lokomotiv- und Waggonbaufabrik)	340	Maybach Mercedes-Benz 836 B	1958	shunter, branchline
D301 (Krupp M350D2)	01-80	62 01- 62 80		D	(West Germany) Krupp	340	Maybach Mercedes-Benz 836 B	1962	shunter, branchline, mainline (Madura)
BB300 (Krupp M700BB)	01-30	58 01- 58 30		B-B	(West Germany) Krupp	680	Maybach Mercedes Benz 820 B	1958	shunter, branchline, mainline (Sumatra)
BB301 (Krupp M1500BB)	01-30	64 01- 64 30		B-B	(West Germany) Krupp	1500	MTU MD 12V 538 TB10	1964	mainline
BB301 (Krupp M1500BB)	51-55	70 01- 70 05		B-B	(West Germany) Krauss-Maffei	1500	MTU MD 12V 538 TB10	1970	mainline
BB302 (Henschel DHG1000BB)	01-06	70 01- 70 06		B-B	(West Germany) Henschel	1200 (Note: 900 until 1998)	MTU 12V 493 TZ10 (Note: MTU 12V 393 TZ10 prior to 1998)	1970	mainline, regional
BB303 (Henschel DHG1000BB)	01-15	73 01- 73 15		B-B	(West Germany) Henschel	1200 (1010 until 1998)	MTU 12V 493 TW10	1973	mainline, regional
BB303 (Henschel DHG1000BB)	16-19	75 01- 75 04		B-B	(West Germany) Henschel	1200	MTU 12V 493 TW10	1975	mainline, regional
BB303 (Henschel DHG1000BB)	20-21	76 01- 76 02		B-B	(West Germany) Henschel	1200	MTU 12V 493 TW10	1976	mainline, regional
BB303 (Henschel DHG1000BB)	22-37	78 01- 78 16		B-B	(West Germany) Henschel	1300	MTU 12V 493 TW10	1978	mainline, regional
BB303 (Henschel DHG1000BB)	38-42	80 01- 80 05		B-B	(West Germany) Henschel	1300	MTU 12V 493 TW10	1980	mainline, regional
BB303 (Henschel DHG1000BB)	43-57	84 01- 84 15		B-B	(West Germany) Henschel	1300	MTU 12V 493 TW10	1984	mainline, regional
BB304 (Krupp M1500BB)	01-11	76 01- 76 11		B-B	(West Germany) Krupp	1550	MTU 12V 652 TB11	1976	mainline
BB304 (Krupp M1500BB)	12-25	84 01- 84 14		B-B	(West Germany) Krupp	1550 (Note: BB304 23R has 1850 hp after repowered in 2010)	MTU 12V 652 TB11 (Note: MTU 12V 4000 R41 (For BB304 23R after repowered))	1984	mainline
BB305 (NL-35A)	01	n/a		B-B	(Japan) Nippon Sharyo	335	Komatsu-Cummins NRTD-6-B1	1977	shunter. Owned by cement company Semen Nusantara (then Solusi Bangun Indonesia)
BB305 (Ldh1500BB)	01-03	n/a		B-B	(Austria) Jenbacher	1550	MTU 12V 65 TB11	1982	freight, mainline. Owned by paper company Kertas Leces
BB305 (BB1500HV)	04-06	n/a		B-B	(France) CFD	1550	MTU 12V 652 TB11	1984	freight, mainline. Owned by paper company Kertas Leces
BB306 (Henschel DHG800BB)	01-22	84 01- 84 22		B-B	(West Germany) Henschel	900	MTU 8V 396 TC12	1984	mainline, regional
CC300	01-03	12 01- 12 03		C-C	(Indonesia) INKA	2500	Caterpillar 3512B HD	2012	mainline. Owned by Directorate-General of Railways, Ministry of Transportation
CC300	04-05	14 01- 14 02		C-C	(Indonesia) INKA	2500	Caterpillar 3512B HD	2014	mainline. Owned by Directorate-General of Railways, Ministry of Transportation
DD55 (JNR DD13)	12	n/a		B-B	(Japan) Fuji Heavy Industries	1000	DMF31SB (2 units)	1974 (built), 2006 (import)	freight, mainline, construction. Owned by Directorate-General of Railways, Ministry of Transportation

=== 750 mm gauge ===
Diesel–hydraulic
Class	Unit number	Image	Axles	Builder	Power (hp)	Engine	Entered service	Initial use
C301	01-08		C	(Netherlands) NCM Holland	260	GM-8V 71 NGO	1972	mainline (Aceh)

=== 600 mm gauge ===
Diesel–mechanical
Class	Unit number	Image	Axles	Builder	Power (hp)	Engine	Entered service	Initial use
B100 (Bima Kunting 1)	01		1A	(Indonesia) PNKA Yogyakarta workshop	60	Willys L134	1963	branchline, experimental

=== Standard gauge ===
Diesel–electric
Class	Road no.	Image	Axles	Builder	Power (hp)	Engine	Entered service	Initial use
CC207 (DF4D)	23 01		Co-Co	(China) CRRC Dalian	3940	16V240ZJ*	2023	mainline, backup (KCIC)

== Internal combustion multiple units ==
=== Diesel multiple units ===
==== Hydraulic transmission ====
Class	Internal name	Image	Sets built	Cars per set	Builder	Power (hp)	Engine	Transmission	Year built	Remark
MADW300 (id)	N/A		3	1	(West Germany) Glossing und Schöler GmbH, Ferrostaal	215	GM 8V71	Voith hydraulic Diwabus	1962-63	Single railcars, 1st class with baggage room, later downgraded to 3rd class, all retired, one preserved in Lempuyangan railway station
MBW300 (id)	N/A		7	1	(West Germany) Glossing und Schöler GmbH, Ferrostaal	215	GM 8V71	Voith hydraulic Diwabus	1962-63	Single railcars, 2nd class, later downgraded to 3rd class, all retired
MCW301 (id)	N/A		12	2	(Japan) Nippon Sharyo	180	Shinko DMH17H	Shinko TC-2A	1976-1977	2-car set, one car with toilet and one without, but both are independent railcars that can run on its own, some converted into economy class cars and baggage cars. All retired
MCW302 Model 1978-1982 (id)	N/A		84	1	(Japan) Nippon Sharyo	1x290	Shinko DMH17HSA	Shinko TCR2.5	1978-1982	Single railcars, some were refurbished to Model 1987 spec in 1990s, some converted into economy class cars and baggage cars, most are retired
MCW302 Model 1987 (id)	MH101		28	1	(Japan) Nippon Sharyo	1x280	Cummins NT855 R5	Voith T211r re. 3	1987	Single railcars, most are retired
Kereta Inspeksi 4 (id)	MH201		1	5	(Japan) Nippon Sharyo (original) (Indonesia) KAI Yogyakarta workshop (refit)	4x280	Cummins NT855 R5	Voith T211r re. 3	2020	5-car set rebuilt from MCW302 series. Class change probably due to having one trailer car in the middle
KRDI (id)	MH201		12	4	(Indonesia) INKA	2x517	Cummins N14E-R3 JWAC	Voith T211r re. 4	2008-2013	4-car set. INKA inspection trains were based on this class
KRDI (id)	MH201		1	2	(Indonesia) INKA	1x375	Cummins N14E-R	Voith T211r	2008	2-car set built for standard gauge railway in Aceh (id)

==== Electric transmission ====
Class	Internal name	Image	Sets built	Cars per set	Builder	Power (hp)	Engine	Traction Equipment	Year built	Remark
MCW104 (Railcar Perintis)	N/A		1		(Netherlands) Beijnes (body) (Indonesia) PJKA Bukit Duri depot (conversion to DMU)	60	Detroit 8V-71	n/a	ca. 1970	Converted from former Jakarta EMU
MCW200	n/a		1		(Netherlands) Beijnes (body) (Indonesia) PJKA Yogyakarta workshop (conversion to DMU)	250	Kromhout (nl) 12TV120	n/a	ca. 1970	Converted from former Jakarta EMU
KRDE (id)	ME201		5	5	(Indonesia) INKA	1x1850	Cummins QSK45	Toshiba, Pindad	2006-2009	Rebuilt from BN-Holec EMU (id); 5-car sets
C-KRDE (id)	ME201		5	5	(Indonesia) INKA	1x1850	Cummins QSK45	Toshiba, Pindad	2012	Air conditioned, rebuilt from BN-Holec EMU (id); 5-car sets 2 sets was modified in 2021–2022 for planned use as Whoosh feeder train
KRDE Push Pull (id)	ME202		2	5	(Indonesia) INKA	1x1850	Cummins (unknown model)	Unknown	2009	Rebuilt from ABB-Hyundai EMU (id); 5-car sets
Railbus Kertalaya (id)	N/A		1	3	(Indonesia) INKA	1x400	Cummins QSM11	Unknown	2009-2011	Articulated 3-car set
Railbus	N/A		2	3	(Indonesia) INKA	1x750	Cummins QSK45	Siemens Mobility, Pindad	2009-2011	Articulated 3-car sets, one set for Batara Kresna (id), and another one set for Lembah Anai (id)
KRDE ARS Kualanamu	Woojin DEMU		4	4	(South Korea) Woojin Industrial	2x750	Cummins SK19-R	Woojin Industrial	2012	4-car sets, operated by KAI Bandara for Kualanamu International Airport railway link
KRDE ME204	ME204		7	4	(Indonesia) INKA	2x750	Cummins QSK19-R	Bombardier Transportation (batch 1, TS1-3), Medcom (Poland), Mitsubishi Electric (batch 2, TS 3-7)	2018-2023	4-car sets, used for Airport Train in Padang, Surakarta, and Yogyakarta
KRDE BPKASS	N/A		3	3	(Indonesia) INKA	N/A	N/A	N/A	2023	3-car sets built for standard gauge railway in South Sulawesi, operated under KAI-South Sulawesi Government JV

=== Gasoline multiple units ===
Classified as Motor Coaches (Dutch: Motorwagen}. Operated by Deli Railway Company (DSM) in North Sumatra and Probolinggo Steam Tram Company (PbSM) in East Java during the colonial period. Some were inherited by the Indonesian State Railways.

Class	Internal name	Image	Number built	Builder	Power (hp)	Engine	Transmission	Build date	Remark
MR	N/A		10	(French Third Republic) Renault (propulsion) (Netherlands) Beijnes (body)	n/a	Renault gasoline engine (Note: one unit was modified with Saurer 8.0.D diesel engine in 1933)	n/a	1925–1928	Operated by DSM. Retired as motor coaches by 1942
MrBCr	N/A		3	(French Third Republic) Renault-SCEMIA	n/a	Renault gasoline engine (Note: MrCBr 2 was re-engined with Kromhout diesel engine in 1938. It was re-engined again in 1947 with 6-cylinder International truck gasoline engine)	n/a	1927	Operated by PbSM. One unit survived World War II and retired as motor coach by 1952

=== Hybrid multiple units ===
Class	Internal name	Image	Number built	Builder	Power (hp)	Engine	Transmission	Build date	Remark
Sarana Khusus Kereta Hibrida PNM	N/A		1	(Indonesia) INKA	n/a	n/a	n/a	2023	Operated by Politeknik Negeri Madiun. Combination of overhead line, battery, diesel engine, and fuel cell

== Electric locomotives ==
All electric locomotives have been replaced by electric multiple units.
System: 1.5 kV DC overhead, unless stated.

Overhead line
Class	Unit number	Image	Axles	Builder/Manufacturer	Power (kW)	Year built	Remark
3000	3001-3002		1-D-1	(Switzerland) SLM, BBC	1000	1924	Also known as BBC 0 series after independence
3000	3003-3004		1-D-1	(Switzerland) SLM, BBC	1000	1927	Also known as BBC 0 series after independence
3100	3101		1-B+B-1	(Weimar Republic) AEG	1,100	1924	
3200	3201-3202		1-B+B-1	(Netherlands) Werkspoor, Heemaf	765	1925	Also known as WH 200 series after independence
3200	3203-3206		1-B+B-1	(Netherlands) Werkspoor, Heemaf	765	1928	Also known as WH 200 series after independence
3300	3301-3303		B+B	(Weimar Republic) Borsig, AEG	800	1930	
Battery
Class	Unit number	Image	Axles	Builder/Manufacturer	Power (kW)	Year built	Remark
4000	4001-4002		D	(Netherlands) Werkspoor	115	1924	360 V DC battery locomotives

== Electric multiple units ==
=== 3 ft 6 in gauge rollingstock ===
System: 1.5 kV DC overhead, 750 V third rail, and battery

Overhead line
Class	Internal name	Image	Units	In service	Cars per Set	Manufacturer	Power (kW)	Traction system	Remarks
ESS 100/200/300/400/700 series	N/A		50	0	1, 2	(Netherlands) - (United States) General Electric Transportation, Heemaf, Westinghouse (traction system), Werkspoor, Beijnes, Allan (body) (ca. 1925)	n/a	Resistor control	Delivered in 3 different configurations (trailer car, motor car, and motor car with baggage compartment). Trailer car classified as 700 series. Retired 1960s, converted to locomotive hauled coaches or DEMU
Rheostatik	ED101		120	0	3, 4, 6	(Japan) - (Indonesia) Nippon Sharyo, Kawasaki Heavy Industries, Hitachi Rail (1976-1987)	8x120 (4-car)	Resistor control	retired 2013, scrapped or stored
BN-Holec	EA101		128	0	4	(Germany) (Belgium) (Netherlands) - (Indonesia) BN (Bombardier), Holec, INKA (1994-2001)	n/a	VVVF-GTO	retired 2013, some modified to become diesel commuter trains or Holec AC
ABB Hyundai	N/A		8	0	4	(Germany) (South Korea) - (Indonesia) ABB, Hyundai Precision, INKA (1994)	n/a	VVVF-GTO	retired 2001, some modified to become diesel commuter trains in 2007-2009 as KRDE Arek Surokerto from 2009-2013, All units have been scrapped in July 2023
Inka-Hitachi	EA102		24	0	4	(Japan) - (Indonesia) Hitachi Rail, INKA (1997)	8x170 (4-car)	VVVF-GTO	retired 2013, scrapped or stored
Toei 6000 series	ED102		72	0	4, 6, 8	(Japan) Nippon Sharyo, Kawasaki Heavy Industries, Hitachi Rail, Alna Kohi (1968-1976)	2400 (6-car)	Resistor control	ex-Toei Mita Line rolling stock, operated by KAI Commuter 2000–2016, scrapped or stored. One head car preserved at Depok Depot
103 series	ED103		16	0	4, 8	(Japan) Nippon Sharyo, Kawasaki Heavy Industries, Kinki Sharyo, Hitachi Rail, Teikoku Sharyo, Tokyu Car Corporation, Kisha Seizo (1963-1984)	440 (per motor car)	Resistor control	ex-JNR/JR East Musashino Line rolling stock, operated by KAI Commuter 2004–2016, all scrapped
KRL-I	EA201		8	0	4	(Indonesia) INKA, LEN, Pindad (2001)	n/a	VVVF-IGBT	operated by KAI Commuter 2001–2015, retired
Tokyu 8000 series	ED201		24	0	12	(Japan) Tokyu Car Corporation (1969-1985)	520 (per motor car)	Chopper	ex-Tokyu Toyoko Line and Oimachi Line rolling stock, operated by KAI Commuter 2006–2024, retired
Tokyu 8500 series	ED202		64	0	8(formerly), 12(currently)	(Japan) Tokyu Car Corporation (1975-1991)	520 (per motor car)	Chopper	ex-Tokyu Den-en-toshi Line and Oimachi Line rolling stock, operated by KAI Commuter 2006–2025, retired
Tōyō Rapid 1000 series	ED104		30	0	8	(Japan) Nippon Sharyo, Kawasaki Heavy Industries, Kinki Sharyo, Tokyu Car Corporation, Hitachi Rail, Kisha Seizo, Teikoku Sharyo (1964-1967)	400 (per motor car)	Resistor control	ex-Tōyō Rapid Railway line rolling stock, operated by KAI Commuter 2007–2019, scrapped or stored
Tokyo Metro 5000 series	ED105		30	0	8	(Japan) Nippon Sharyo, Kawasaki Heavy Industries, Kinki Sharyo, Tokyu Car Corporation, Kisha Seizo, Teikoku Sharyo (1964-1967)	400 (per motor car)	Resistor control	ex-Tokyo Metro Tōzai Line rolling stock, operated by KAI Commuter 2007– January 2020, scrapped or stored
Tokyo Metro 7000 series	ED301		40	0	8	(Japan) Nippon Sharyo, Kawasaki Heavy Industries, Kinki Sharyo, Tokyu Car Corporation (1974-1989)	580 (per motor car)	Chopper	ex-Tokyo Metro Yūrakuchō Line rolling stock, operated by KAI Commuter 2011–2025, 2 units decommissioned and Retirement to 16 November 2025
Tokyo Metro 05 series	ED302		80	0	8	(Japan) Nippon Sharyo, Kawasaki Heavy Industries, Hitachi Rail, Kinki Sharyo, Tokyu Car Corporation (1988-1991)	640 (per motor car)	Chopper	ex-Tokyo Metro Tōzai Line rolling stock, operated by KAI Commuter 2010–2025 Some under review for refurbishment by INKA
Tokyo Metro 6000 series	ED303 EA204		270	0	8, 10	(Japan) Nippon Sharyo, Kawasaki Heavy Industries, Hitachi Rail, Kinki Sharyo, Kisha Seizo, Tokyu Car Corporation (1968-1990)	580 (per motor car)	Chopper; VVVF-IGBT	ex-Tokyo Metro Chiyoda Line rolling stock, operated by KAI Commuter 2011–2026 Some under review for refurbishment by INKA
203 series	ED304		50	0	10, 12	(Japan) Kawasaki Heavy Industries, Kinki Sharyo, Tokyu Car Corporation (1982-1986)	3,000 (6M4T) 2,400 (4M4T)	Chopper	ex-JNR/JR East Joban Line rolling stock, operated by KAI Commuter 2011–2025, retired
i9000	EA202		40	40	8	(Indonesia) - (Germany) INKA, Bombardier (2011)	n/a	VVVF-IGBT	Financed by KfW, operated by KAI Commuter 2011–2019 (Greater Jakarta) and 2021–present (Yogya-Solo)
Holec AC	EA101		24	0	8	(Indonesia) - (South Korea) INKA, Woojin Industrial (2013–14)	n/a	VVVF-IGBT	former 1994-2001 KRL Ekonomi Holec trains retrofitted with AC, operated by KAI Commuter 2014–2015, currently stored. 2 head cars preserved in Madiun
205-0 series 205-5000 series	ED106 EA205		812	782	8, 10, 12	(Japan) Nippon Sharyo, Kawasaki Heavy Industries, Hitachi Rail, Kinki Sharyo, Tokyu Car Corporation (1984-1994)	480 (per motor car)	Resistor control (205-0); VVVF-IGBT (205-5000)	205-0 ex-JR East Saikyo Line, Yokohama Line, Nambu Line, and Musashino Line rolling stock, operated by KAI Commuter 2013–present 205-5000 series ex-Musashino Line rolling stock, operated by KAI Commuter 2018–present
EA203	EA203		60	60	6	(Indonesia) - (Germany) INKA, Bombardier (2017)	3,200 (4M2T)	VVVF-IGBT	Operated by KAI Bandara for Soekarno-Hatta International Airport railway link, 2017–2022 Operated by KAI Commuter for Soekarno-Hatta International Airport railway link, 2023–present
SFC120-V CLI-125	EA206		132	132	12	(China) CRRC Qingdao Sifang (2025-TBD)	TBA (6M6T)	VVVF-IGBT	Operated by KAI Commuter, 2025–present
iE305 CLI-225	EA207		192 (ordered)	60	12	(Indonesia) - (Japan) INKA, J-TREC (2025-TBD)	TBA (6M6T)	VVVF-IGBT	Operated by KAI Commuter, 2025–present
Third rail
Class	Internal name	Image	Units	In service	Cars per Set	Manufacturer	Power (kW)	Traction system	Remarks
iLRT203NG	N/A		24	24	3	(Indonesia) - (China) INKA, CRRC Zhuzhou (2017)	1,040 (2M1T)	VVVF-IGBT	Operated by KAI for Palembang LRT, 750 V third rail, 2018–present
Battery
Class	Internal name	Image	Units	In service	Cars per Set	Manufacturer	Power (kW)	Traction system	Remarks
INKA Autonomous Battery Tram	N/A		1	(Indonesia) INKA	n/a	n/a	n/a	2023	Operated by PT. INKA

=== Standard gauge rollingstock ===
System: 25 kV AC overhead & 750 V third rail

Third rail
Class	Internal name	Image	Sets built	In service	Cars per Set	Manufacturer	Power (kW)	Traction system	Remarks
iLRT203SG	N/A		31	54	6	(Indonesia) - (Spain) INKA, CAF (2018)	1,600 (4M2T)	VVVF-IGBT	Operated by KAI for Greater Jakarta LRT, 750 V third rail, 2023–present
Overhead line
Class	Internal name	Image	Units	In service	Cars per Set	Manufacturer	Power (kW)	Traction system	Remarks
CR400AF	KCIC400AF		11	88	8	(China) CRRC Qingdao Sifang (2022)	9600(4M4T)	VVVF-IGBT	Operated by KCIC (2nd tier subsidiary of KAI) for Whoosh, 25 kV AC overhead, 2023–present. Also derived as inspection train (1 trainset).

== Coaches and wagons ==
=== Passenger coaches ===
Class	Image	Type	Number built		Manufacturer	Max speed	Year built	Remark
K1 New Generation Modification		K1	2	5	(Indonesia) INKA	100 km/h	2025–present	Modified "New Generation" Executive Trains retrofitting of various older coaches. Modified by the Balai Yasa Manggarai and Balai Yasa Tegal.
K1 New Generation Modification		M	3	5	(Indonesia) INKA	100 km/h	2025–present	Modified "New Generation" Executive Trains retrofitting of various older coaches. Modified by the Balai Yasa Manggarai and Balai Yasa Tegal.
K1 Luxury New Generation		K1 Luxury	11	11	(Indonesia) INKA	120 km/h	2023–2024	
K1/K3 Stainless Steel 2nd Generation		K1	118	273	(Indonesia) INKA CRRC	120 km/h	2023–2024	Improvement from the first generation stainless steel coaches made in 2018–2019. With redesigned interiors and seats and new features such as automatic doors and bellow gangway connection.
K1/K3 Stainless Steel 2nd Generation		K3	104	273	(Indonesia) INKA CRRC	120 km/h	2023–2024	Improvement from the first generation stainless steel coaches made in 2018–2019. With redesigned interiors and seats and new features such as automatic doors and bellow gangway connection.
K1/K3 Stainless Steel 2nd Generation		M	26	273	(Indonesia) INKA CRRC	120 km/h	2023–2024	Improvement from the first generation stainless steel coaches made in 2018–2019. With redesigned interiors and seats and new features such as automatic doors and bellow gangway connection.
K1/K3 Stainless Steel 2nd Generation		P	25	273	(Indonesia) INKA CRRC	120 km/h	2023–2024	Improvement from the first generation stainless steel coaches made in 2018–2019. With redesigned interiors and seats and new features such as automatic doors and bellow gangway connection.
T1 Compartment suite		T1	6	6	(Indonesia) INKA	120 km/h	2008–2009	Originally built as executive coaches between 2008 and 2009. Converted by Manggarai Railway Workshop in 2023. Ex : (K1 0 08 03, K1 0 08 04, K1 0 08 07)
K1 Panoramic		K1	11	11 (3 sets)	(Indonesia) INKA		2022 (first generation), 2023 (second generation), 2025 (third generation)	Converted from K1 1999, K1 2001 and K1 2002. Introduced in 25 September 2022.
K1 Sleeper Luxury		K1 Luxury 2	6	10	(Indonesia) INKA	120 km/h	2019	Similar to K1/K3 Stainless Steel coaches but with "Sleeper Luxury" seating and amenities.
K1 Sleeper Luxury		K1 Luxury 1	4	10	(Indonesia) INKA	120 km/h	2018	Similar to K1/K3 Stainless Steel coaches but with "Sleeper Luxury" seating and amenities.
K1/K3 2018 Stainless Steel 1st Generation		K1	210	438 (38 sets)	(Indonesia) INKA	120 km/h	2018–2019	The first passenger coaches made by INKA to feature stainless steel car body for the domestic market.
K1/K3 2018 Stainless Steel 1st Generation		K3	150	438 (38 sets)	(Indonesia) INKA	120 km/h	2018–2019	The first passenger coaches made by INKA to feature stainless steel car body for the domestic market.
K1/K3 2018 Stainless Steel 1st Generation		M	39	438 (38 sets)	(Indonesia) INKA	120 km/h	2018–2019	The first passenger coaches made by INKA to feature stainless steel car body for the domestic market.
K1/K3 2018 Stainless Steel 1st Generation		P	39	438 (38 sets)	(Indonesia) INKA	120 km/h	2018–2019	The first passenger coaches made by INKA to feature stainless steel car body for the domestic market.
K3 2017 Premium		K3	48	66 (6 sets)	(Indonesia) INKA	120 km/h	2017	Similar to K3 2016 New Image but with ample legrooms and reclining seats.
K3 2017 Premium		K3 (Accessible)	12	66 (6 sets)	(Indonesia) INKA	120 km/h	2017	Similar to K3 2016 New Image but with ample legrooms and reclining seats.
K3 2017 Premium		MP3	6	66 (6 sets)	(Indonesia) INKA	120 km/h	2017	Similar to K3 2016 New Image but with ample legrooms and reclining seats.
K3 2016 New Image		K3	63	70 (7 sets)	(Indonesia) INKA	120 km/h	2016	Similar to K1 2016 New Image with a new style of economy class seating, abandoning the bench-style seating from prior K3 coaches.
K3 2016 New Image		MP3	7	70 (7 sets)	(Indonesia) INKA	120 km/h	2016	Similar to K1 2016 New Image with a new style of economy class seating, abandoning the bench-style seating from prior K3 coaches.
K1 2016 New Image		K1	88	106 (9 sets)	(Indonesia) INKA	120 km/h	2016–2017	A redesign from the older K1 coaches featuring continuous-style window arrangement similar to which on K1 "Argo Anggrek" coaches though with a different construction for ease of maintenance.
K1 2016 New Image		M	9	106 (9 sets)	(Indonesia) INKA	120 km/h	2016–2017	A redesign from the older K1 coaches featuring continuous-style window arrangement similar to which on K1 "Argo Anggrek" coaches though with a different construction for ease of maintenance.
K1 2016 New Image		P	9	106 (9 sets)	(Indonesia) INKA	120 km/h	2016–2017	A redesign from the older K1 coaches featuring continuous-style window arrangement similar to which on K1 "Argo Anggrek" coaches though with a different construction for ease of maintenance.
K3 AC "Kemenhub"		K3	124	136	(Indonesia) INKA	100 km/h	2010–2014	The first economy class coaches to feature built-in air conditioning units. These coaches can accommodate 80 passengers with 2-2 seating arrangements compared to older K3 coaches which feature 3-2 seating arrangements. Some units were designed to accommodate handicapped passengers. In 2023, some coaches were refurbished with new interiors and seat. It also reduced its capacity from 80 to 72 in order to give more legroom. These refurbished coaches are allocated for KA Jayabaya and dubbed as "Ekonomi New Generation".
K3 AC "Kemenhub"		MP3	12	136	(Indonesia) INKA	100 km/h	2010–2014	
K1 2009/2010 "Airliner"		K1	22	26	(Indonesia) INKA	120 km/h	2009–2010	A redesign from the previous K1 coaches fitted out with airplane-style windows and interior design. Built for KA Gajayana (2009) and KA Argo Jati (2010)
K1 2009/2010 "Airliner"		M1	2	26	(Indonesia) INKA	120 km/h	2009–2010	A redesign from the previous K1 coaches fitted out with airplane-style windows and interior design. Built for KA Gajayana (2009) and KA Argo Jati (2010)
K1 2009/2010 "Airliner"		BP	2	26	(Indonesia) INKA	120 km/h	2009–2010	A redesign from the previous K1 coaches fitted out with airplane-style windows and interior design. Built for KA Gajayana (2009) and KA Argo Jati (2010)
K3 "Mini"		K3	4	5	(Indonesia) INKA		2009	Intended for rack rail system in West Sumatra. A scaled down version of the K3 "Nutrisari", with length of 15.5 meters and capacity of 68 passengers.
K3 "Mini"		KMP3	1	5	(Indonesia) INKA		2009	Intended for rack rail system in West Sumatra. A scaled down version of the K3 "Nutrisari", with length of 15.5 meters and capacity of 68 passengers.
K3 2008 "Divre 2"		K3	4	5	(Indonesia) INKA	100 km/h	2008	Intended for rail system in West Sumatra, similar to the K3 "Nutrisari".
K3 2008 "Divre 2"		KMP3	1	5	(Indonesia) INKA	100 km/h	2008	Intended for rail system in West Sumatra, similar to the K3 "Nutrisari".
K3 2008/2009 "Nutrisari"		K3	61	67	(Indonesia) INKA	100 km/h	2008–2009	Has standard economy class capacity of 106 seats. Dubbed "Nutrisari" by local railfans community due to its initial livery resembling the packaging of a certain powdered fruit drink brand.
K3 2008/2009 "Nutrisari"		KMP3	6	67	(Indonesia) INKA	100 km/h	2008–2009	Has standard economy class capacity of 106 seats. Dubbed "Nutrisari" by local railfans community due to its initial livery resembling the packaging of a certain powdered fruit drink brand.
K1 2008		K1	8	10	(Indonesia) INKA	100 km/h	2008	Built for KA Argo Lawu. 3 units were converted into Compartment Suites Train (K1 0 08 03, K1 0 08 04, K1 0 08 07)
K1 2008		M1	1	10	(Indonesia) INKA	100 km/h	2008	Built for KA Argo Lawu. 3 units were converted into Compartment Suites Train (K1 0 08 03, K1 0 08 04, K1 0 08 07)
K1 2008		BP	1	10	(Indonesia) INKA	100 km/h	2008	Built for KA Argo Lawu. 3 units were converted into Compartment Suites Train (K1 0 08 03, K1 0 08 04, K1 0 08 07)
K3 2006		K3	24	26	(Indonesia) INKA	90 km/h	2006	Has standard economy class capacity of 106 seats.
K3 2006		KMP3	2	26	(Indonesia) INKA	90 km/h	2006	Has standard economy class capacity of 106 seats.
K1 2002		K1	42	50	(Indonesia) INKA	100 km/h	2002	Some units were transferred to PT. KAI Divre 3 Palembang.
K1 2002		M1	4	50	(Indonesia) INKA	100 km/h	2002	Some units were transferred to PT. KAI Divre 3 Palembang.
K1 2002		BP	4	50	(Indonesia) INKA	100 km/h	2002	Some units were transferred to PT. KAI Divre 3 Palembang.
K1 2001		K1	12	14	(Indonesia) INKA	100 km/h	2001	Built for KA Gajayana. One unit (K1 0 01 08) designed to accommodate handicapped passengers. Some units were modified into Panoramic Leisure Train.
K1 2001		M1	1	14	(Indonesia) INKA	100 km/h	2001	Built for KA Gajayana. One unit (K1 0 01 08) designed to accommodate handicapped passengers. Some units were modified into Panoramic Leisure Train.
K1 2001		BP	1	14	(Indonesia) INKA	100 km/h	2001	Built for KA Gajayana. One unit (K1 0 01 08) designed to accommodate handicapped passengers. Some units were modified into Panoramic Leisure Train.
K1 1999		K1	17	19	(Indonesia) INKA	100 km/h	1999	These executive class coaches are not featured with emergency windows. Currently, some units were refurbished into airplane-style windows and interior design by Manggarai railway workshop. One unit (K1 0 99 16) modified into Panoramic Leisure Train.
K1 1999		MP1	2	19	(Indonesia) INKA	100 km/h	1999	These executive class coaches are not featured with emergency windows. Currently, some units were refurbished into airplane-style windows and interior design by Manggarai railway workshop. One unit (K1 0 99 16) modified into Panoramic Leisure Train.
K1 1998		K1	14	18	(Indonesia) INKA	100 km/h	1998	Built for KA Argo Wilis. Some units were transferred to PT. KAI Divre 1 Medan.
K1 1998		M1	2	18	(Indonesia) INKA	100 km/h	1998	Built for KA Argo Wilis. Some units were transferred to PT. KAI Divre 1 Medan.
K1 1998		BP	2	18	(Indonesia) INKA	100 km/h	1998	Built for KA Argo Wilis. Some units were transferred to PT. KAI Divre 1 Medan.
K1 JS-852		K1	41	55	(Indonesia) INKA Alsthom	120 km/h	1997 and 2001	A major improvement based on the JS-950/JB-250 featuring an all-new car body design with its wide body profile, continuous-style window arrangement, and a set of sliding plug doors. They are also equipped with CL243 (K9) bogies licensed from GEC Alstom, providing a smoother ride quality at higher speeds. Currently stored.
K1 JS-852		M1	7	55	(Indonesia) INKA Alsthom	120 km/h	1997 and 2001	A major improvement based on the JS-950/JB-250 featuring an all-new car body design with its wide body profile, continuous-style window arrangement, and a set of sliding plug doors. They are also equipped with CL243 (K9) bogies licensed from GEC Alstom, providing a smoother ride quality at higher speeds. Currently stored.
K1 JS-852		BP	7	55	(Indonesia) INKA Alsthom	120 km/h	1997 and 2001	A major improvement based on the JS-950/JB-250 featuring an all-new car body design with its wide body profile, continuous-style window arrangement, and a set of sliding plug doors. They are also equipped with CL243 (K9) bogies licensed from GEC Alstom, providing a smoother ride quality at higher speeds. Currently stored.
K2 1996		K2	3	3	(Indonesia) INKA		1996	Business class coaches with K8 NT-60 bogies made by INKA in 1996 (K2-96800 series).
K1 JSO-751		K1	10	12	(Indonesia) INKA	120 km/h	1996	The executive class coaches which built for KA Argo Lawu in 1996. The passenger coaches were the results from the modification and overhaul of 1955 ABL-9000 series economy class set by INKA in 1995–1996.
K1 JSO-751		M1	1	12	(Indonesia) INKA	120 km/h	1996	The executive class coaches which built for KA Argo Lawu in 1996. The passenger coaches were the results from the modification and overhaul of 1955 ABL-9000 series economy class set by INKA in 1995–1996.
K1 JSO-751		BP	1	12	(Indonesia) INKA	120 km/h	1996	The executive class coaches which built for KA Argo Lawu in 1996. The passenger coaches were the results from the modification and overhaul of 1955 ABL-9000 series economy class set by INKA in 1995–1996.
K1 JS-950 / JB-250		K1	25	31	(Indonesia) INKA	120 km/h	1995	INKA's first executive class coaches first launched for KA Argo Bromo and KA Argo Gede services in 1995. They feature a new bogie design, the NT-60 (K8) allowing them to run 120 km/h for the express services. One unit (K1 0 95 04) modified into Priority Leisure Train, One dining coach (M1 0 95 01) refurbished into airplane-style windows.
K1 JS-950 / JB-250		KM1	3	31	(Indonesia) INKA	120 km/h	1995	INKA's first executive class coaches first launched for KA Argo Bromo and KA Argo Gede services in 1995. They feature a new bogie design, the NT-60 (K8) allowing them to run 120 km/h for the express services. One unit (K1 0 95 04) modified into Priority Leisure Train, One dining coach (M1 0 95 01) refurbished into airplane-style windows.
K1 JS-950 / JB-250		BP	3	31	(Indonesia) INKA	120 km/h	1995	INKA's first executive class coaches first launched for KA Argo Bromo and KA Argo Gede services in 1995. They feature a new bogie design, the NT-60 (K8) allowing them to run 120 km/h for the express services. One unit (K1 0 95 04) modified into Priority Leisure Train, One dining coach (M1 0 95 01) refurbished into airplane-style windows.
K1 1964		K1	20	20	(Indonesia) INKA		1990–1991	Converted from Japanese-built K3 1964 (CW 9100 series) and refurbished by INKA in 1990–1991. These coaches retain their original windows size, with the modification to the interior included new panelling, seats, and central air conditioning units.
K2 1986		K2	36	36	(Indonesia) INKA		1986	Business class coaches made by Industri Kereta Api (INKA) in 1986 (K2-86500 series).
K3 1985/1986		CW	76	86	(Indonesia) INKA		1985–1986	Economy class coaches made by Industri Kereta Api (INKA) in 1985–1986 (CW-9885 / K3-85500 & K3-86500 series). The first production model of passenger coaches made by INKA.
K3 1985/1986		CFW	10	86	(Indonesia) INKA		1985–1986	Economy class coaches made by Industri Kereta Api (INKA) in 1985–1986 (CW-9885 / K3-85500 & K3-86500 series). The first production model of passenger coaches made by INKA.
K2 1985		BW	6	6	(Indonesia) INKA		1985	Business class coaches made by Industri Kereta Api (INKA) in 1985 (BW-9150 / K2-85500 series). The first production model of passenger coaches made by INKA.
K1 1984		AW	35	43	(Romania) Astra Arad		1984	The executive class coaches that PJKA bought from Astra Arad, Romania, to replace KA Bima Sleeper Class in 1984. Currently, some units were refurbished into airplane-style windows and interior design by Manggarai railway workshop.
K1 1984		FW	3	43	(Romania) Astra Arad		1984	The executive class coaches that PJKA bought from Astra Arad, Romania, to replace KA Bima Sleeper Class in 1984. Currently, some units were refurbished into airplane-style windows and interior design by Manggarai railway workshop.
K1 1984		DPW	5	43	(Romania) Astra Arad		1984	The executive class coaches that PJKA bought from Astra Arad, Romania, to replace KA Bima Sleeper Class in 1984. Currently, some units were refurbished into airplane-style windows and interior design by Manggarai railway workshop.
K2 1980/1982		BW	28	28	(Japan) Nippon Sharyo		1980 and 1982	Business class coaches that PJKA bought from Nippon Sharyo and other manufacturers in Japan in 1980 and 1982 (BW-9086 / K2-80500 and BW-9135 / K2-82500 series).
K2/K3 1978		BW	35	90	(Socialist Federal Republic of Yugoslavia) Goša FOM		1978	Business and economy class coaches that PJKA bought from Goša FOM in 1978 (K2 / K3-78700 series). Later some of the coaches were converted to executive class. The Yugoslav-built coaches has Görlitz (K7) bogie.
K2/K3 1978		CW	32	90	(Socialist Federal Republic of Yugoslavia) Goša FOM		1978	Business and economy class coaches that PJKA bought from Goša FOM in 1978 (K2 / K3-78700 series). Later some of the coaches were converted to executive class. The Yugoslav-built coaches has Görlitz (K7) bogie.
K2/K3 1978		CFW	8	90	(Socialist Federal Republic of Yugoslavia) Goša FOM		1978	Business and economy class coaches that PJKA bought from Goša FOM in 1978 (K2 / K3-78700 series). Later some of the coaches were converted to executive class. The Yugoslav-built coaches has Görlitz (K7) bogie.
K2/K3 1978		DPW	15	90	(Socialist Federal Republic of Yugoslavia) Goša FOM		1978	Business and economy class coaches that PJKA bought from Goša FOM in 1978 (K2 / K3-78700 series). Later some of the coaches were converted to executive class. The Yugoslav-built coaches has Görlitz (K7) bogie.
K2 1978		BW	34	34	(Japan) Nippon Sharyo		1978	Business class coaches that PJKA bought from Nippon Sharyo and other manufacturers in Japan in 1978 (BW-9100 / K2-78500 series). Later some of the coaches were converted to executive class. The Japanese-built business class coaches has NT-11 (K5) bogie.
K1 1967		SAGW	7	28	(East Germany) VEB Waggonbau Görlitz		1967	SAGW and SBGW were first and second class sleeper coaches built for KA Bima. The trainset also consisted of dining coaches (FW/AC) and baggage cars with generator (DPW). The sleeper coaches were refurbished and converted to regular executive class (K1 1967 & 1993 series) by INKA in 1990s.
K1 1967		SBGW	10	28	(East Germany) VEB Waggonbau Görlitz		1967	SAGW and SBGW were first and second class sleeper coaches built for KA Bima. The trainset also consisted of dining coaches (FW/AC) and baggage cars with generator (DPW). The sleeper coaches were refurbished and converted to regular executive class (K1 1967 & 1993 series) by INKA in 1990s.
K1 1967		FW/AC	4	28	(East Germany) VEB Waggonbau Görlitz		1967	SAGW and SBGW were first and second class sleeper coaches built for KA Bima. The trainset also consisted of dining coaches (FW/AC) and baggage cars with generator (DPW). The sleeper coaches were refurbished and converted to regular executive class (K1 1967 & 1993 series) by INKA in 1990s.
K1 1967		DPW	7	28	(East Germany) VEB Waggonbau Görlitz		1967	SAGW and SBGW were first and second class sleeper coaches built for KA Bima. The trainset also consisted of dining coaches (FW/AC) and baggage cars with generator (DPW). The sleeper coaches were refurbished and converted to regular executive class (K1 1967 & 1993 series) by INKA in 1990s.
CW/BW 9000		CW	57	117	(East Germany) VEB Waggonbau Bautzen		1966–1967	Unique features of this series are the continuous ventilation grills above the windows, which later were removed later during refurbishment. Some of the BW and CW coaches were converted to executive class (AW) coaches in 1978.
CW/BW 9000		BW	35	117	(East Germany) VEB Waggonbau Bautzen		1966–1967	Unique features of this series are the continuous ventilation grills above the windows, which later were removed later during refurbishment. Some of the BW and CW coaches were converted to executive class (AW) coaches in 1978.
CW/BW 9000		CFW	25	117	(East Germany) VEB Waggonbau Bautzen		1966–1967	Unique features of this series are the continuous ventilation grills above the windows, which later were removed later during refurbishment. Some of the BW and CW coaches were converted to executive class (AW) coaches in 1978.
CW 9300		CW	118	163	(Hungarian People's Republic) Rába		1965–1966	Mostly retired. Unique features of this series are the individual ventilation grill above each windows and the "upside-down bowl-shaped" ventilators. The ventilation grills were removed during refurbishment.
CW 9300		FW	10	163	(Hungarian People's Republic) Rába		1968	Mostly retired. Unique features of this series are the individual ventilation grill above each windows and the "upside-down bowl-shaped" ventilators. The ventilation grills were removed during refurbishment.
CW 9300		DW	35	163	(Hungarian People's Republic) Rába		1968	Mostly retired. Unique features of this series are the individual ventilation grill above each windows and the "upside-down bowl-shaped" ventilators. The ventilation grills were removed during refurbishment.
BW/FW 9000		BW	15	25	(West Germany) Maschinenfabrik Esslingen		1965	Second class coaches.
BW/FW 9000		FW	10	25	(West Germany) MAN SE		1965	Dining coaches.
CW 9100		CW	120	135	(Japan) Nippon Sharyo		1964–1965	Third class coaches. 20 units were converted to executive class (K1) coaches in 1990–1991.
DW 9000		DW	15	135	(Japan) Nippon Sharyo		1964	Third class coaches. 20 units were converted to executive class (K1) coaches in 1990–1991.
CW/CFW 9000		CW	90	110	(Austria) Simmering-Graz-Pauker		1964–1965	Third class coaches.
CW/CFW 9000		CFW	20	110	(Austria) Simmering-Graz-Pauker		1965	Mixed third class coaches with dining compartment.
CR 300		CR	14	14	(Japan) Nippon Sharyo		1961	Third class coaches, exclusively used for rail system in Aceh with 750 millimetres (2 ft 6 in) gauge. All scrapped.
CL/DL 9600/9700		CL	13	16	(Austria) Simmering-Graz-Pauker		1958	Originally intended for rail system in Southern Sumatra, later some units were sent to Java. Some of the CL coaches were converted to baggage (B and BP) coaches in late 1980s. Two of the CL coaches were converted to executive class (K1) coaches in early 2000s.
CL/DL 9600/9700		DL	3	16	(Austria) Simmering-Graz-Pauker		1958	Originally intended for rail system in Southern Sumatra, later some units were sent to Java. Some of the CL coaches were converted to baggage (B and BP) coaches in late 1980s. Two of the CL coaches were converted to executive class (K1) coaches in early 2000s.
ABL/FL 9600		ABL	4	7	(Netherlands) Beijnes		1958	Originally intended for rail system in Southern Sumatra, later some units were sent to Java. Some of the ABL coaches were converted to baggage (B and BP) coaches in late 1980s.
ABL/FL 9600		FL	3	7	(Netherlands) Beijnes		1958	Originally intended for rail system in Southern Sumatra, later some units were sent to Java. Some of the ABL coaches were converted to baggage (B and BP) coaches in late 1980s.
CR/CDR 7000		CR	14	20	(Japan) Nippon Sharyo		1958	Used exclusively in West Sumatra rail system. Consisted of economy class coaches and economy class with baggage compartment. In 1970s some units were modified to business class (K2). In 2005 two units were modified to executive class (K1) and business plus (K2) by adding split-type air conditioning units. Retired after 2014.
CR/CDR 7000		CDR	6	20	(Japan) Nippon Sharyo		1958	Used exclusively in West Sumatra rail system. Consisted of economy class coaches and economy class with baggage compartment. In 1970s some units were modified to business class (K2). In 2005 two units were modified to executive class (K1) and business plus (K2) by adding split-type air conditioning units. Retired after 2014.
CL/AC 9000		CL	27	27	(France) Société Franco-Belge	120 km/h	1954–1955	Third class coaches with ice blocks air conditioning and capacity of 92 passengers, used for express trains. 19 units were converted to BL/AC (second class with AC) coaches in late 1950s, and later reconverted to AL (first class) coaches. Further 8 units were converted to TAL 9000 tourist coaches.
CL 9200		CL	88	88	(Netherlands) Werkspoor, Beijnes		1953–1955	Third class coaches.
CL 9100		CL	35	119	(Austria) Simmering-Graz-Pauker		1954	Third class coaches.
CFL/CDL/DL 9000		CFL	30	119	(Austria) Simmering-Graz-Pauker		1954	Mixed third class coaches with dining compartment.
CFL/CDL/DL 9000		CDL	11	119	(Austria) Simmering-Graz-Pauker		1954	Mixed third class coaches with baggage compartment.
CFL/CDL/DL 9000		DL	43	119	(Austria) Simmering-Graz-Pauker		1954	Baggage coaches
ABL 9000		ABL	49	49	(France) Société Lorraine, Brissonneau and Lotz, Carel Fouché	120 km/h	1954–1955	Mixed first and second class coaches ordered by DKA in 1953, designed by Société Lorraine with passenger capacity of 12 first class seats and 47 second class seats. Retired starting in the 1970s. Some were converted to third class (K3) coaches in 1980s, and those were reconverted into K1 1996 series.
CL 8500		CL	100	100	(Netherlands) Werkspoor, Beijnes		1952–1953	Third class coaches ordered in 1950 by DKA for short-distance intercity and local trains. Mostly retired by 1980s. As of 2022, only 2 units remained and one of them (NR 8505 of Cipinang depot) is still in service as rescue and emergency coach.
SS 9000		SAGL			(Netherlands) Beijnes		1938	Former 1st class sleeper coaches built for Staatsspoorwegen's De Java Nacht Express service in 1938. Two surviving units (IW 38212 and IW 38221) were refurbished and converted to luxury class coaches by Surabaya Gubeng workshop in 2008. Both units were nicknamed "Djoko Kendil". In early September 2023, the coaches were trialed with the TB-398 (K5) bogies, which replaced their original K2 "Pennsylvania" bogies. Rehabilitated anew in 2025 for use in the planned Jakalalana tourist heritage railtour/express train service on the Bogor-Cianjur route, to be operated for KAI Ltd by the Provincial Government of West Java.

=== Tourist coaches ===
Class	Image	Type	Number built		Manufacturer	Max speed	Year built	Remark
GGWK		GGWK	3	3	(Indonesia) Solo Balapan Train Depot	n/a	2000	Modified version of the TTW type carriage.

=== Freight wagons ===
Class	Image	Type	Number built	Manufacturer	Max speed	Year built	Remark
PPCW 42 Ton		Flat wagon (GD)	1,800~	(Indonesia) INKA	90 km/h	2010–2014	Four axle flat wagons made by INKA with load capacity of 42 metric tonnes. Used to carry shipping containers, steel coil, cement sacks, rails, and others.
KKBW 45 Ton		Open wagon (GB)	266~	(Indonesia) INKA	c.a 80 km/h	1999–2001	These open wagons (Gerbong terBuka/GB) was made by INKA. It can carry 45 metric tonnes of coal and sometimes, logs. Used exclusively for Kertapati coal train. It is characterized by its cylindrical shape and smooth walls.
KKBW 50 Ton		Open wagon (GB)	3,190~	(Canada) Hawker Siddeley, (Indonesia) INKA, (China) Baotou Beifang Chuangye, Co.Ltd	c.a 80 km/h	1986–2022	These open wagons was made by three companies. With payload of 50 metric tonnes of coal, it is one of the largest capacity wagons owned by Kereta Api Indonesia. It is exclusively used in the South Sumatra and Lampung railway system. It is characterized by its boxy and huge body and corrugated walls.
ZZOW B51		Hopper wagon (ZZOW)	100	(Romania) Astra Arad		1984	Also known as ZZOW 30000 series. PJKA brought in 100 units of this type of hopper wagons with 30 tonnes capacity from Romania for the purpose of transporting track ballast.
PKPKW D61		Flat wagon (GD)	40	(Romania) Astra Arad		1984	These six-axle flat wagons with 45 tonnes capacity was used to carry 40 ft shipping containers.
PPCW D54		Flat wagon (GD)	132	(Romania) Astra Arad		1984	Also known as PPCW 100 series. Converted from Romanian-made TTW wagons by completely removing the body walls and adding container locks. These 30 tonnes flat wagons is used for the Cigading coal train. Because they are shorter, these wagons cannot be used on container trains, except for using it as platform for caboose container.
YYW P53		Open wagon (GB)	70	(Romania) Astra Arad		1984	Also known as YYW 70 series. Four-axle open wagons with 30.5 tonnes capacity.
YYW P51		Open wagon (GB)	42	(Romania) Astra Arad		1984	Also known as YYW 200 series. These 30 gonnes capacity open wagons were converted from TTW wagons by removing their sliding roofs. These wagons were initially used to transport volcanic sands from the Mount Galunggung. Later batch of YYW conversions were done for use on transporting quartz sand. These wagons are also used to transport track ballast.
GGW T55		Covered wagon (GT)	57	(Romania) Astra Arad		1984	Also known as GGW 100 series. The T55 wagons were imported from Romania and initially were planned for the Fast Freight Train service. However, when it arrived in Indonesia, it was used for Semen Nusantara's cement trains instead.
GGW T52	A PUSRI train with T54 and T52 wagons	Covered wagon (GT)	175	(South Korea) Daewoo		1977	These covered wagons with 30 tonnes capacity were bought and owned by PT Pupuk Sriwidjaja (PUSRI) and were used to transport and distribute their fertilizers. These PUSRI covered wagons were consisted of three type, the T52, T53 and T54 series. T52 series has slab-sided body and curved roofs, T53 has triangular roofs, while T54 has corrugated body and triangular roofs.
GGW T53	A PUSRI train with T54 and T52 wagons	Covered wagon (GT)	220	(Canada) Hawker Siddeley		1982	These covered wagons with 30 tonnes capacity were bought and owned by PT Pupuk Sriwidjaja (PUSRI) and were used to transport and distribute their fertilizers. These PUSRI covered wagons were consisted of three type, the T52, T53 and T54 series. T52 series has slab-sided body and curved roofs, T53 has triangular roofs, while T54 has corrugated body and triangular roofs.
GGW T54	A PUSRI train with T54 and T52 wagons	Covered wagon (GT)	200	(South Korea) Korea Shipbuilding & Engineering Co., Daewoo, Hyundai Rollingstock Mfg		1984–1985	These covered wagons with 30 tonnes capacity were bought and owned by PT Pupuk Sriwidjaja (PUSRI) and were used to transport and distribute their fertilizers. These PUSRI covered wagons were consisted of three type, the T52, T53 and T54 series. T52 series has slab-sided body and curved roofs, T53 has triangular roofs, while T54 has corrugated body and triangular roofs.
GGW T51	A T51 wagon that has been converted into an emergency wagon	Covered wagon (GT)	40	(Japan) Mitsubishi Heavy Industries, Nippon Sharyo		1977	These covered wagons (Gerbong Tertutup/GT) was imported by PJKA from Japanese manufacturers, including Mitsubishi Heavy Industries and Nippon Sharyo Seizo Keisha. This GT series has a boxy physical shape and corrugated walls.
KKW K53		Tank wagon (GK)	15	(Japan) Nippon Sharyo		1977	30 tonnes capacity tank wagons.
KKBW C51		Open wagon (KKBW)	40	(Romania) Astra Arad		1965	Also known as KKBW 21 series. Open wagons with 30 tonnes capacity.
TTW S52		Sliding-roof wagon (GT)		(Romania) Astra Arad		1964, 1984	Also known as TTW 4000 series. PJKA brought these sliding-roof wagons with 30 tonnes capacity in two batches, namely in 1964 and in 1984. These wagons were used to transport cement.
VW/VR 1000		Cattle wagon	250	(Czechoslovakia) Tatra		1964	In 1964 PNKA imported 250 VW/VR-1000 series cattle wagons. This carriage is coded H11, the letter V in the numbering means Vee (cattle in Dutch), while W indicates that this carriage is equipped with compressed air brakes, and R indicates that this carriage only uses hand brakes.
GW T22		Covered wagon (GT)	455	(Netherlands) Werkspoor	75 km/h	1962	Also known as GWB or GW 151 series. Two-axle covered wagons with 15 tonnes capacity.
GR 120000		Covered wagon (GT)	3,000	(Czechoslovakia) - (Indonesia) Strojexport, PN Boma		1961	DKA imported these wagons from Czechoslovakia as CKD kits and assembled them locally. They were initially used for Barang Tjepat (KABAT) fast cargo train, to carry varied expedition cargo, from basic necessities to rolls of paper.
TR		Sliding-roof wagon (GT)	100	PN Boma, PN Indra, Barata Indonesia		1960	Locally made 2-axle sliding-roof wagon, made by several manufacturers and was used to transport cement sacks. As of 2023 there is still one TR wagon remaining in a derelict condition at Tegal Station.
GL T11		Covered wagon (GT)	1,000	(Netherlands) Werkspoor		1952	Also known as GLT 7000 series. Two-axle covered wagons with 12 tonnes capacity. They were initially used for Barang Tjepat (KABAT) fast cargo train.
KR7		Tank wagon (GK)	N/A	N/A	N/A	1914	This tank wagon was originally used to transport oil on the Tanjung Priok–Sukabumi route. KR7 was then assigned as assistance at the Bogor Depot to store locomotive fuel after its service period was over.

== See also ==
- Jakarta Monorail
- Transport in Indonesia
- Monorails in Central Java
- List of named passenger trains of Indonesia
- List of locomotives in Indonesia
- List of railway stations in Indonesia
- List of railway companies in the Dutch East Indies
- Rail transport in Indonesia
- List of railway accidents and incidents in Indonesia
- List of defunct railway in Indonesia
- Trams in Surabaya
- Trams in Jakarta
- Trams in Semarang
- Indonesian railway rolling stock numbering system and classification
