= Beijnes =

- Type: Subsidiary
- Industry: Rail transport
- Founded: 1838; 188 years ago
- Defunct: 1963
- Headquarters: Haarlem, Netherlands
- Area served: Worldwide
- Products: Locomotives; High-speed trains Intercity and commuter trains Trams; People movers Signalling systems

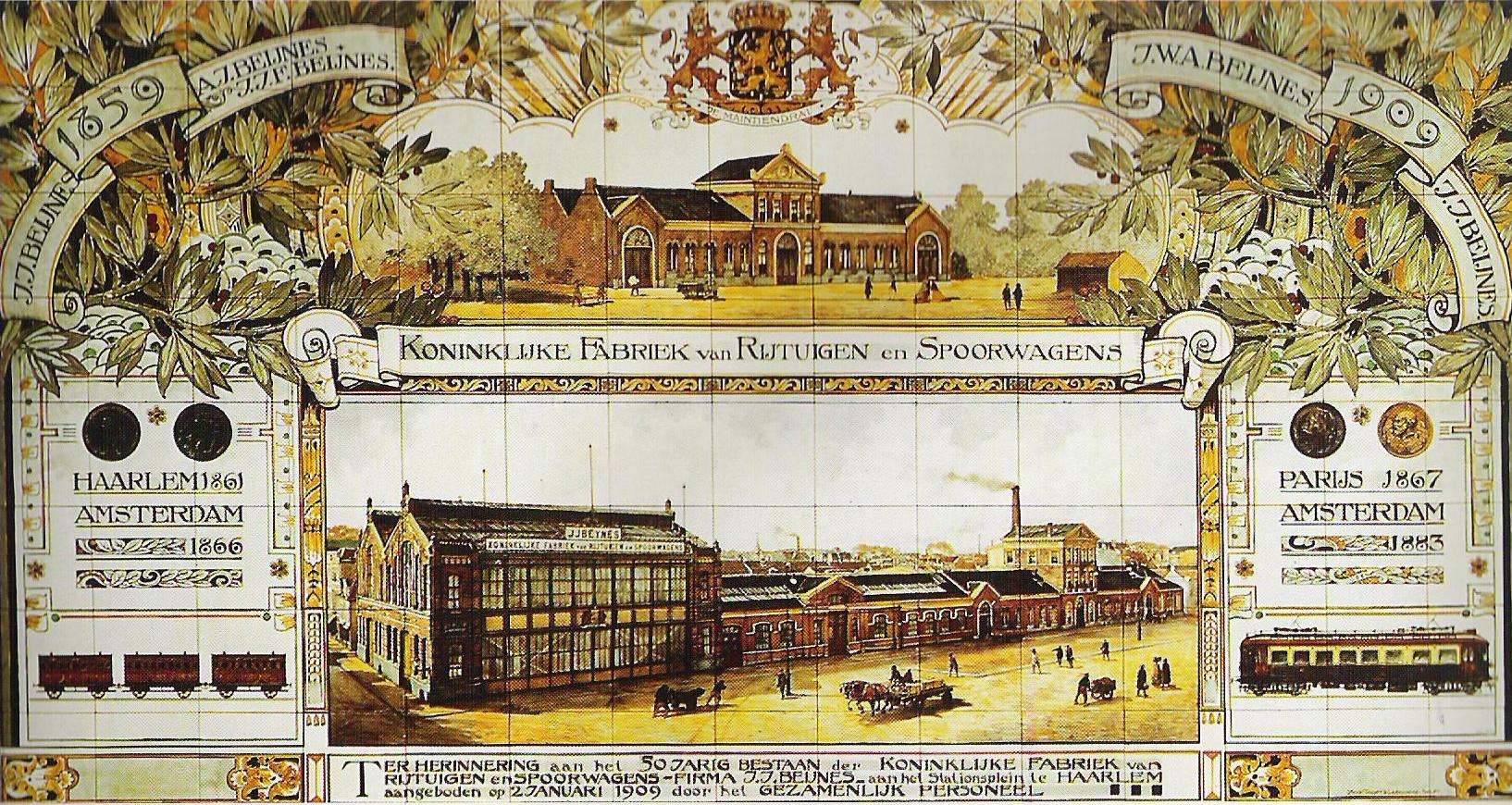
Beijnes across from the Haarlem railway station at the peak of their glory; a tile tablet once located in the hall representing 100 years of service, with the original hall at the top and the modern "twin" expansion seen at the bottom. Nothing remains today besides the name of the parking garage.

Beijnes (1838 – 1963) is a defunct Haarlem manufacturer of carriages, buses, trains, and trams. It was closely associated with the Hollandsche IJzeren Spoorweg-Maatschappij (HIJSM)

== History ==
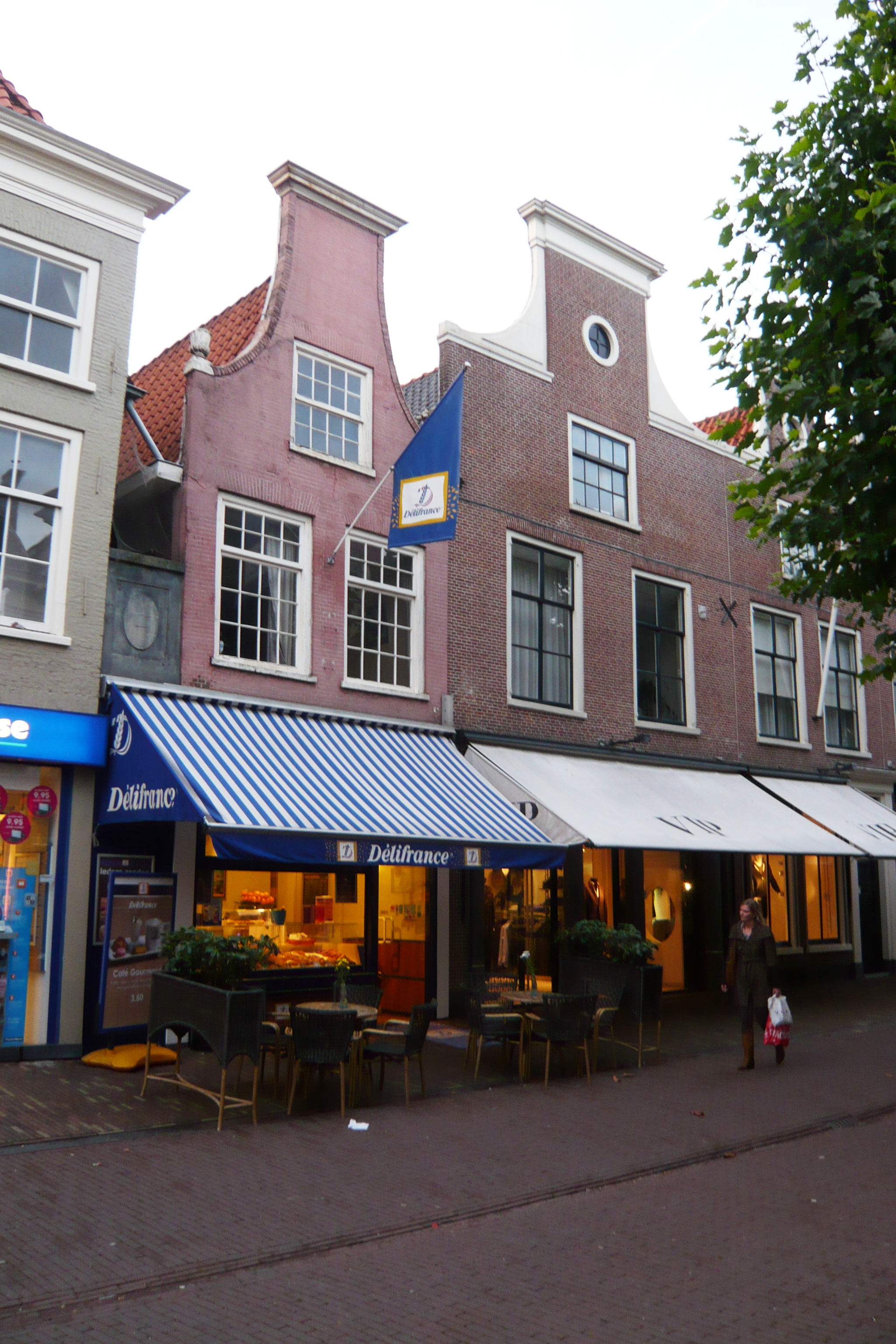
Grote Houtstraat 126, the former location of A.J. Beijnes' smithworks

J.J. Beijnes the elder opened a horse carriage shop (wagenmaker) behind the St. Bavochurch on the Riviervischmarkt in Haarlem in 1838. The painter and writer Jacobus van Looy described such a horse buggy servicing shop in detail in his autobiographical description of his early apprenticeships to a local typesetter and a local carriage shop owner in "Jaap", 1923. The increasing amount of ironwork needed for wagons of all types resulted in J.J. Beijnes merging his business with his brother A.J., a local smith, whose workshop was located at Grote Houtstraat 126 across from the Cornelissteeg in Haarlem.

=== Train ===
The first train line constructed in the Netherlands was a line following the straight route of the Haarlemmertrekvaart canal, connecting Amsterdam with Haarlem, which opened on 20 September 1839. To service the trains on the rails, the HIJSM had British engineers come over along with the locomotives they built. Beijnes was eager to obtain a contract, and it wasn't until 1855 that the services of the Fabriek van Rijtuigen en Spoorwagens J.J. Beijnes won a commission for four charabancs. They were helped along by the local patrons J. Borski and J. Gerken, who both happened to be in the board of directors of the young HIJSM.

After their initial order, the Beijnes company grew so fast, that in 1858 the first stone was laid in the new location at the stationsplein across from the Haarlem railway station. In 1870 King William III added the predicate "Royal" to the company's name and it became Koninklijke Fabriek van Rijtuigen en Spoorwagens J.J. Beijnes. In 1891, the HSM, aided by the social activist Daniel de Clercq, began the Haarlem society called De Ambachtsschool to unify various city efforts to start a vocational school in Haarlem, in order to satisfy their need for skilled workers in the booming train carriage business. In 1896 the "twin hall" was built to service more train compartments simultaneously, and in 1914 the "Staalhal" was built on the Verspronckweg.

=== Electric Train ===
In 1922 the first experiments were made with electric trains. Beijnes won a commission for a model called the Mat.'24. They were called "blokkendozen" for their similarity to a child's building blocks and became a success for years. Their speed was 100 kilometers per hour and over 98 of them were built, with the last one going out of service in 1959. After this initial success, Beijnes was again allowed to innovate with the diesel-electric train in 1933, called the DE-3, which could reach a speed of 125 kilometers per hour and was designed for international service. From 1935, 91 of the streamlined models Mat.'35, Mat.'36, Mat.'40, and Mat.'46 were built. In 1939 the Dutch railways celebrated their 100-year anniversary with two postage stamps, one representing the first locomotive (Arend), and the other the Beijnes-built Mat.’36.

=== World War II ===
The company's history during World War II is a tale of ever-increasing economic distress. The war put an end to international travel (aside from what the German occupying forces desired) and the DE line including the new DE 5, which was designed in 1942-1944 together with Werkspoor in Utrecht and Allan in Rotterdam, could not be exploited. Together with other hardships of war, including the hunger winter, the company declined.

After the war, the company moved the entire factory in 1950 to Beverwijk, where the company had its own train station for workers. It recovered somewhat from the damages of war and with the introduction of the new model ELD 4 in 1956 (called the "hondekop" because the nose looked like the head of a dog), the company was able to see some successful years, though the decline had already set in. In 1959 the company was taken over by Verenigde Machine Fabrieken (VMF) and in 1963 the factory closed after the last model DE 140 was delivered.
