= Indonesian Railways Class BB301 =

Class of Indonesian diesel-hydraulic locomotives

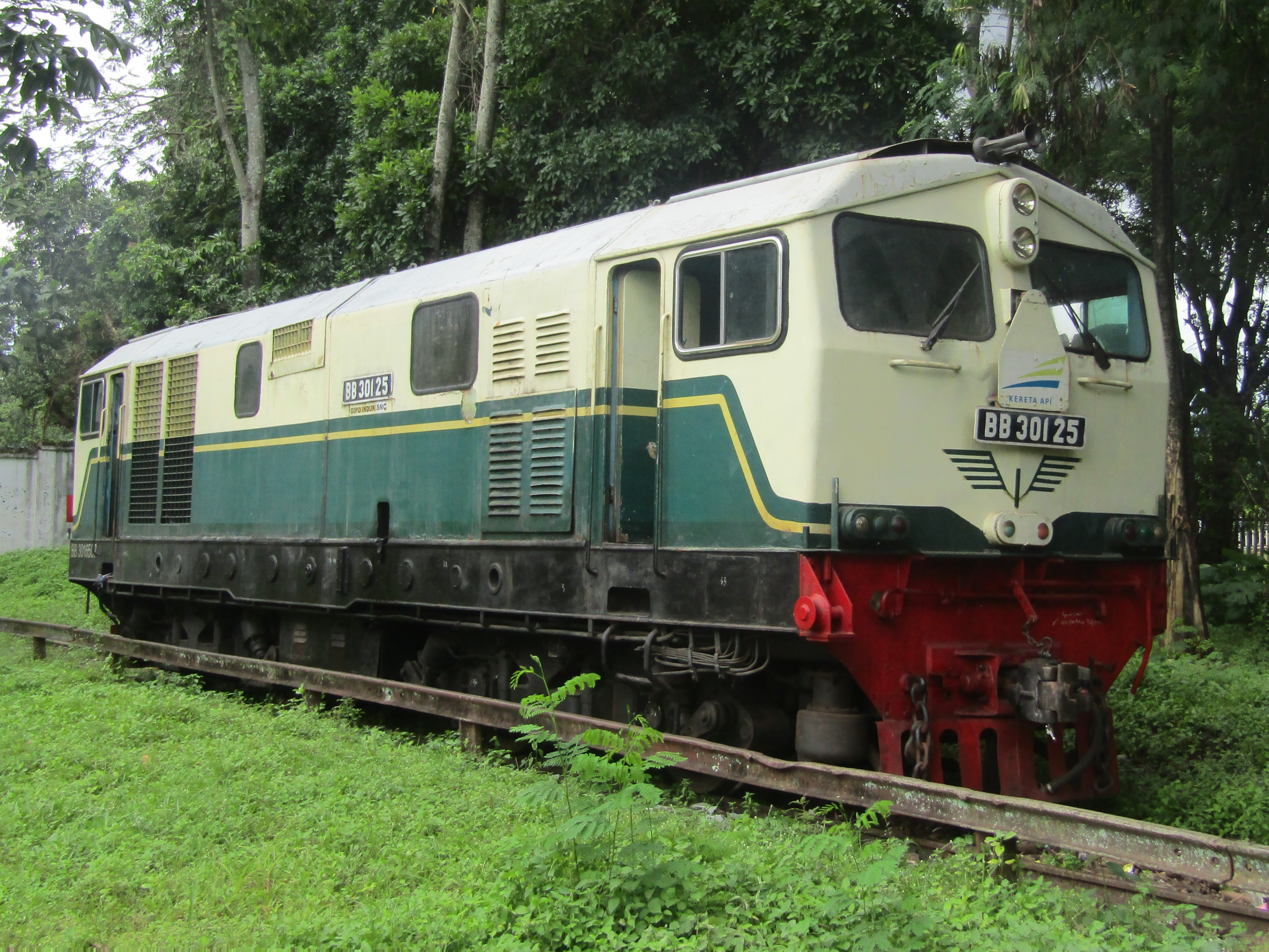
- BB301 25 in March 2019
Type and origin
- Power type: Diesel hydraulic
- Builder: Krupp & Krauss-Maffei, West Germany
- Model: M1500BB
- Build date: 1964–1970
- Total produced: 50
Specifications
- Configuration
  - AAR: B-B
  - UIC: B′B′
- Gauge: 1,067 mm (3 ft 6 in)
- Wheel diameter: 904 mm (2 ft 11.6 in)
- Minimum curve: 80 m (87 yd 1 ft 6 in)
- Wheelbase: 2,200 mm (2 yd 1 ft 3 in)
- Length
  - Over couplers: 13,380 mm (14 yd 1 ft 11 in)
  - Over body: 11,770 mm (12 yd 2 ft 7 in)
- Width: 2,800 mm (3 yd 0 ft 2 in)
- Height: 3,660 mm (4 yd 0 ft 0 in)
- Loco weight: 52 tonnes (51 long tons; 57 short tons)
- Fuel capacity: 2,000 L (440 imp gal; 530 US gal)
- Lubricant cap.: 300 L (66 imp gal; 79 US gal)
- Coolant cap.: 500 L (110 imp gal; 130 US gal)
- Sandbox cap.: 300 L (66 imp gal; 79 US gal)
- Prime mover: MTU MD 12V 538 TB10
- Engine type: 4 stroke, turbocharged
- Transmission: Voith L 630 r U 2
- Loco brake: Knorr VV 450/150-1 compressed air brakes, parking brakes
Performance figures
- Maximum speed: 120 km/h (33 m/s)
- Power output: 1,480 hp (1,100 kW)
- Tractive effort: 10,920 kgf (107,100 N; 24,100 lbf)
Career
- Operators: PT Kereta Api Indonesia
- Nicknames: Roti tawar (loaf bread/sandwich bread)
- Locale: Java Island, North Sumatra
- First run: 1964; 61 years ago
- Preserved: BB301 65 08 (BB301 26)

The BB301 is a class of 50 diesel-hydraulic locomotives built by Krupp and Krauss-Maffei in West Germany for the then Indonesian State Railway (PNKA). The locomotive first entered service in 1964.

== Design and description ==
The locomotive has a length of 11,770 mm (12 yd 2 ft 7 in), width of 2,800 mm (3 yd 0 ft 2 in), and height of 3,660 mm (4 yd 0 ft 0 in). It has empty weight of 48 tonnes (47 long tons; 53 short tons) and operational weight of 52 tonnes (51 long tons; 57 short tons). Its maximum speed is 120 km/h (33 m/s). The earlier BB301 class number 01–45 was powered by a Maybach Mercedes-Benz 836B diesel engine, while the latter number 51–55 was powered by MTU MD 12V 538 TB10, with both engines producing power output of 1,480 hp (1,100 kW). In 1975, the earlier units' Maybach engines were replaced with the MTU 652 engines, similar to BB304 class locomotives. This locomotive has a B′B′ axle, meaning that it has two bogies, each of which has two axles. This locomotive was used to haul passenger trains or freight trains, and later was only used for shunting duties. This locomotive has double cabs configuration.

The BB301 and the later BB304 class is the Indonesian variants of the Krupp M1500BB locomotive series operated by numerous countries.

Aside from the different engine and hydraulic transmission, there are other differences between the earlier BB301 01–45 and the latter 51–55. The earlier BB301s have solid cabin doors, whereas the numbers 51-55 featured windows on the doors. All BB301 have radiator grilles in the shape of two upright rectangles.

== History ==
The locomotives were manufactured by a joint-venture between two West German manufacturers, with the BB301 01–30 and 51–55 built by Krupp, while BB301 31–45 were built by Krauss-Maffei. The gap in numbering were due to differences in specification between the 1964–1965 batch and 1970 batch. The BB 301 class started to enter service in 1964 with the first 10 units, then 35 units in 1965, and the remaining 5 units in 1970, bringing the total to 50 units.

This locomotive has its golden era during the decades from 1964 to 1995 because of it was usually assigned to haul prestigious express trains on Java. The express trains operating at that time were Parahyangan, Bintang Sendja, Djaja, Bandung Express, Bima, Purbaya, and Tumapel. BB301 was the main locomotive for hauling trains on the mainlines of Java Island, both the North line (Jakarta-Cirebon-Semarang-Surabaya) and South line (Jakarta-Bandung-Yogyakarta-Surabaya) during 1970–1980s. Some of the BB301 units were given the repower program in 1984 and 1998 to extend their service life.

With the widespread introduction of diesel-electric locomotives in the 1980s–1990s, by the 2000s remaining BB301 units were relegated to servicing the branch lines or short-distance trains. Two BB301 locomotives were later transferred to North Sumatra. They usually hauled tanker wagons containing fuel oil or palm oil on the Medan-Rantauprapat route. Due to lack of spare parts, there were only 14 units fit for service by 2010. The number of operational BB301 were diminishing over the years and most were dumped or scrapped.

== Preserved units ==
BB301 26 (new number BB301 65 08) is preserved as a monument at the Indonesian Railway Polytechnic campus in Madiun, East Java. It was inaugurated on 17 September 2021.

One of the driver's cab of BB301 33 is preserved at BPTT Darman Prasetyo training facility in Yogyakarta. The locomotive itself was written off after it collided with a semi-trailer truck in 1973. The intact cabin was chopped off and were used as a training simulator for some time.

== Gallery ==
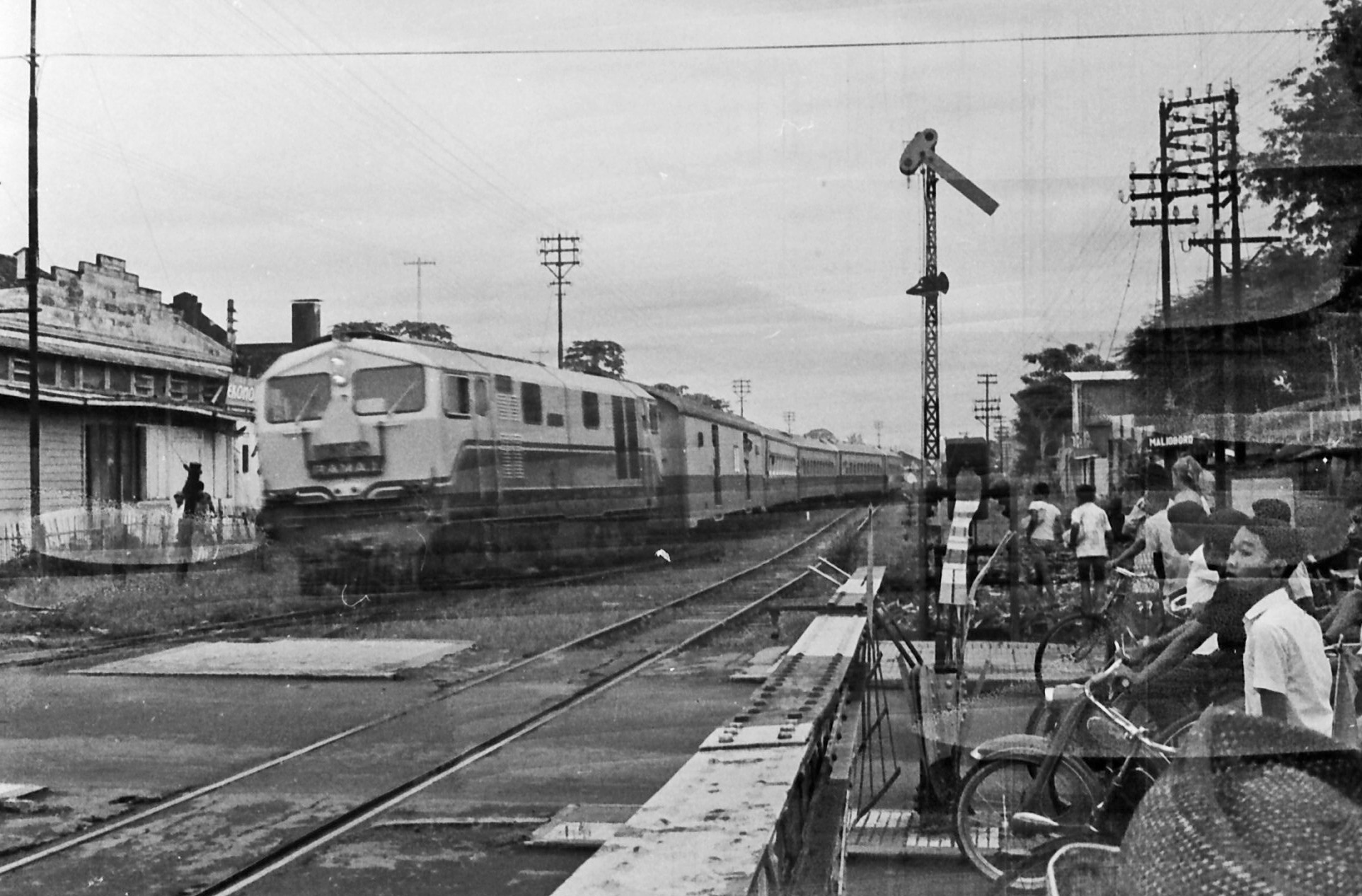
BB301 batch 1970 (no. 51–55) hauling Rama I train in 1971

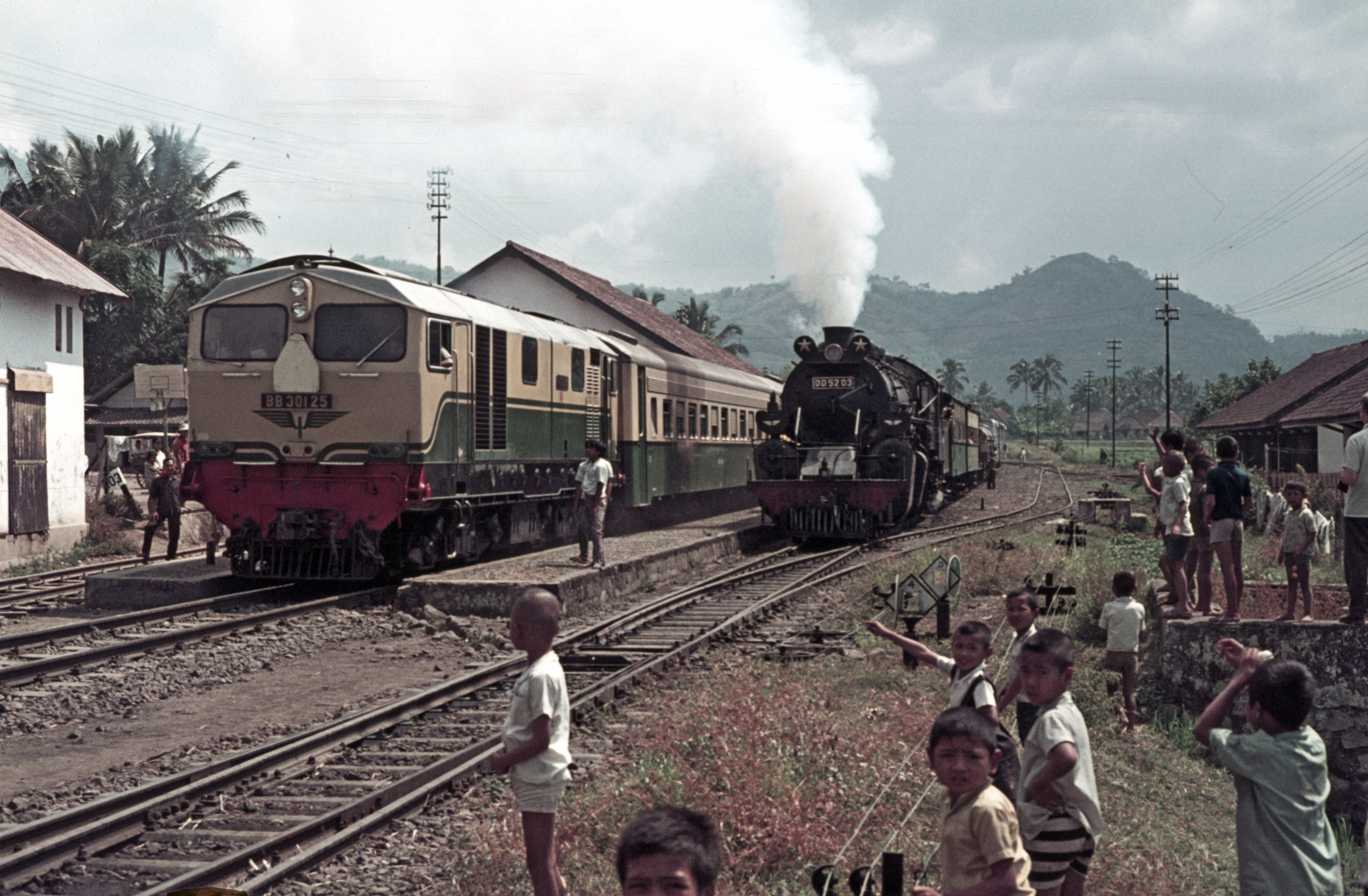
BB301 25 with DD52 03 steam locomotive at Leles station in 1972

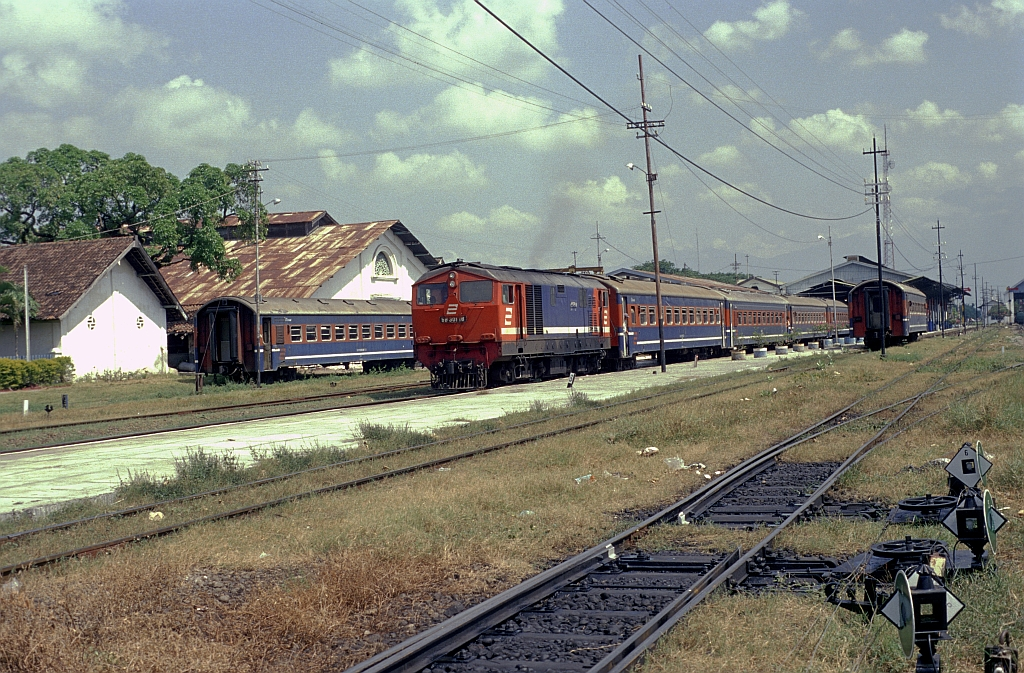
BB301 18 hauling a passenger train at Madiun in 2003

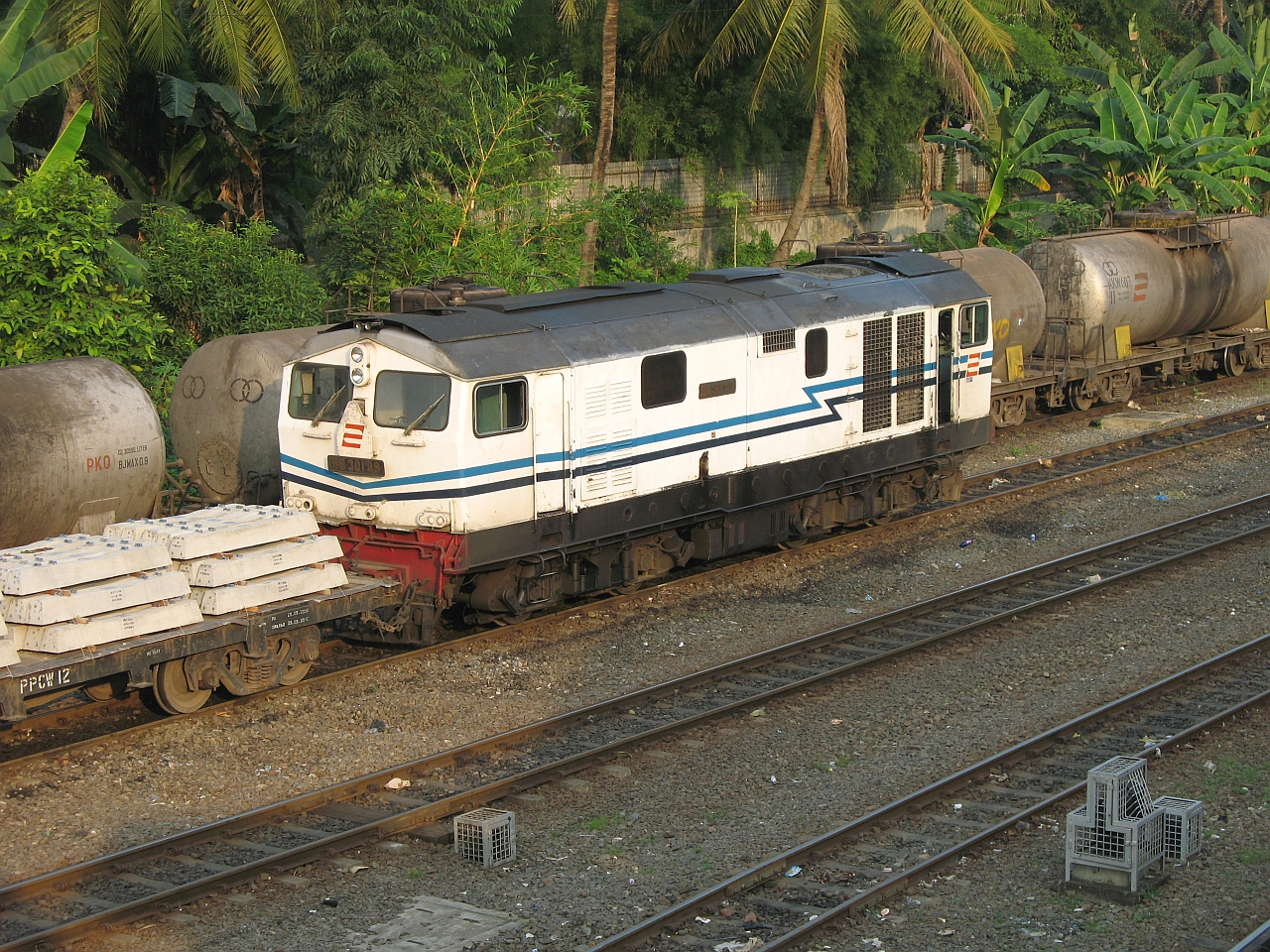
BB301 39 at Medan in 2008

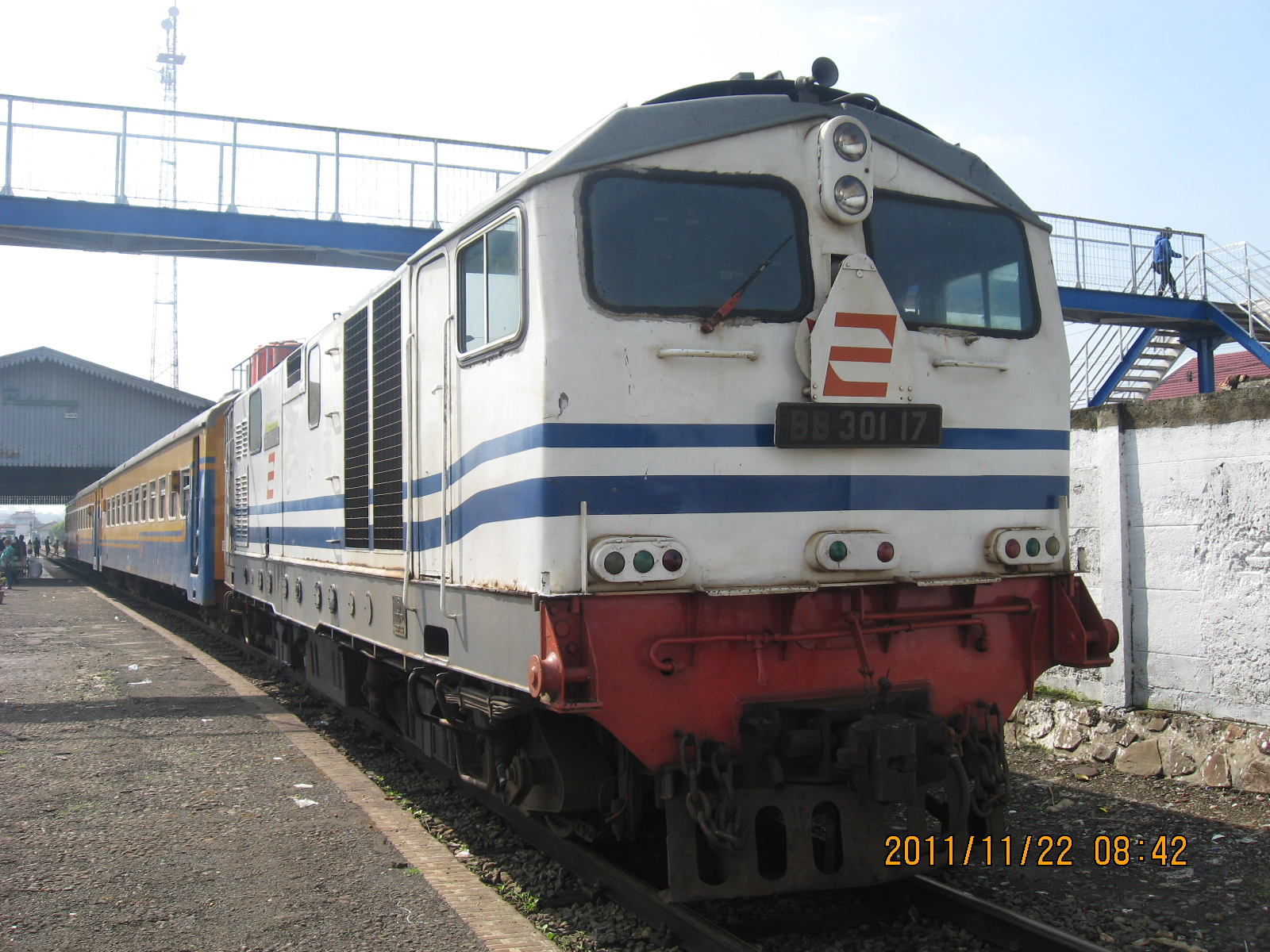
BB301 17 with local train at Padalarang in 2011

== See also ==
- BB302 class
