= Indonesian Railways Class BB302 =

Class of Indonesian diesel-hydraulic locomotives

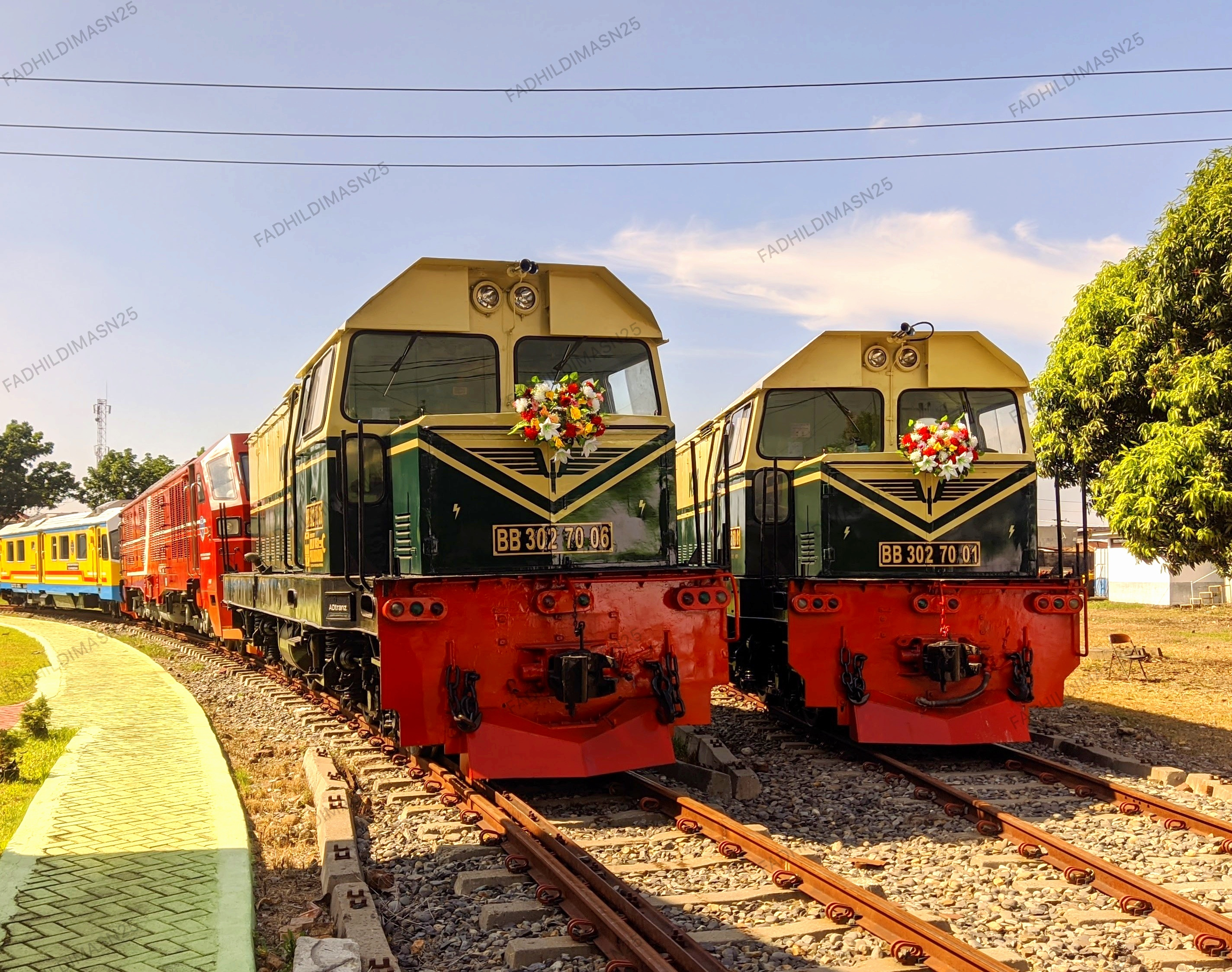
- BB302 70 06 and BB302 70 01 at Pulu Brayan workshop, April 2022
Type and origin
- Power type: Diesel-hydraulic
- Builder: Henschel, West Germany
- Model: DHG1000BB
- Total produced: 6
Specifications
- Configuration
  - AAR: B-B
  - UIC: B′B′
- Gauge: 1,067 mm (3 ft 6 in)
- Wheel diameter: 904 mm (2 ft 11.6 in)
- Minimum curve: 80 m (87 yd 1 ft 6 in)
- Wheelbase: 2,200 mm (2 yd 1 ft 3 in)
- Length
  - Over couplers: 12,810 mm (14 yd 0 ft 0 in)
  - Over body: 11,200 mm (12 yd 0 ft 9 in)
- Width: 2,800 mm (3 yd 0 ft 2 in)
- Height: 3,690 mm (4 yd 0 ft 1 in)
- Loco weight: 44 t (43 long tons; 49 short tons); 40.9 t (40.3 long tons; 45.1 short tons) (empty)
- Fuel capacity: 1,700 L (370 imp gal; 450 US gal)
- Lubricant cap.: 110 L (24 imp gal; 29 US gal)
- Coolant cap.: 800 L (180 imp gal; 210 US gal)
- Sandbox cap.: 285 L (63 imp gal; 75 US gal)
- Prime mover: MB 12V 493 TZ10B, Maybach Mercedes-Benz
- Engine type: 4 stroke, Turbocharger
- Transmission: 1 unit Type: Voith L520 ru2
- Loco brake: Knorr VV 450/150-1 compressed air brakes, Parking brakes
Performance figures
- Maximum speed: 80 km/h (22 m/s)
- Power output: 900 hp (670 kW)
- Tractive effort: 9,240 kgf (90,600 N; 20,400 lbf)
Career
- Operators: Kereta Api Indonesia
- Locale: North Sumatra
- First run: 1970; 55 years ago

The BB302 is a class of diesel-hydraulic locomotives built by Henschel in West Germany for the Indonesian state railways (Perusahaan Negara Kereta Api, PNKA) and entered service in 1970. All BB302s were allocated to North Sumatra.

== Design and description ==
The BB302 class has a length of 11,200 mm (12 yd 0 ft 9 in), width of 2,800 mm (3 yd 0 ft 2 in), and height of 3,690 mm (4 yd 0 ft 1 in). It weighs 44 tonnes (43 long tons; 49 short tons). Its maximum speed is 80 km/h (22 m/s). The class were originally powered by a Maybach Mercedes-Benz 12V 493 TZ10B diesel engine with 900 hp (670 kW); between 1998–2000, a midlife overhaul program was carried out on all units to increase its power output to 1,000 hp (750 kW) by replacing the original engine with an MTU engine. It has two bogies configured in a B′B′ axle arrangement, each of which has two drive shafts connected to each other. It is usually used as a mixed traffic locomotive, to pull passenger or freight trains, and also for shunting.

The BB302 class is part of the Henschel DHG1000BB series, which also includes the BB303 class. The BB302s are virtually identical to the later BB303 class, with the major difference being the weight, as the BB302s are slightly heavier than BB303s. Other differences include the control stand for the BB302 being located on the right-hand side of the cab. Early in its service, the BB302 also used spoked wheels, which were later replaced by the more common unspoked wheels.

== History ==
The BB302 class locomotives are unique: there were 6 units, all of which only operated in North Sumatra. The BB302 class entered service in 1970; introduced to supplement the BB300 class as part of the railway dieselization program.

Over the years, the BB302s, together with its siblings, namely the Henschel-built BB303 and BB306 classes, were a mainstay of the railways in North Sumatra as a mixed traffic locomotive. Initially, the BB302s used the Maybach Mercedes Benz type MB 12V 493 TZ10B engine.

After 25 years of service, the class was rehabilitated with an engine conversion to the MTU engine. The rehabilitation was carried out between 1998–2000 (along with the BB303s in North Sumatra).

With the introduction of the BB203 and CC201 locomotives in North Sumatra, the BB302s were relegated to haul short to medium distance trains, and later relegated to shunting maneuvers. As of 2021, only 2 out of 6 BB302s are serviceable.

== Allocations ==
BB302 70 01 is the only remaining BB302 locomotive at Medan depot which is painted in the PJKA's distinctive yellow-green livery. BB302 70 06 was declared unfit to haul trains, and was later relegated to shunting maneuvers at Pulu Brayan workshop, also painted in the PJKA's vintage livery. The rest of the class were declared unfit for service.

== Gallery ==
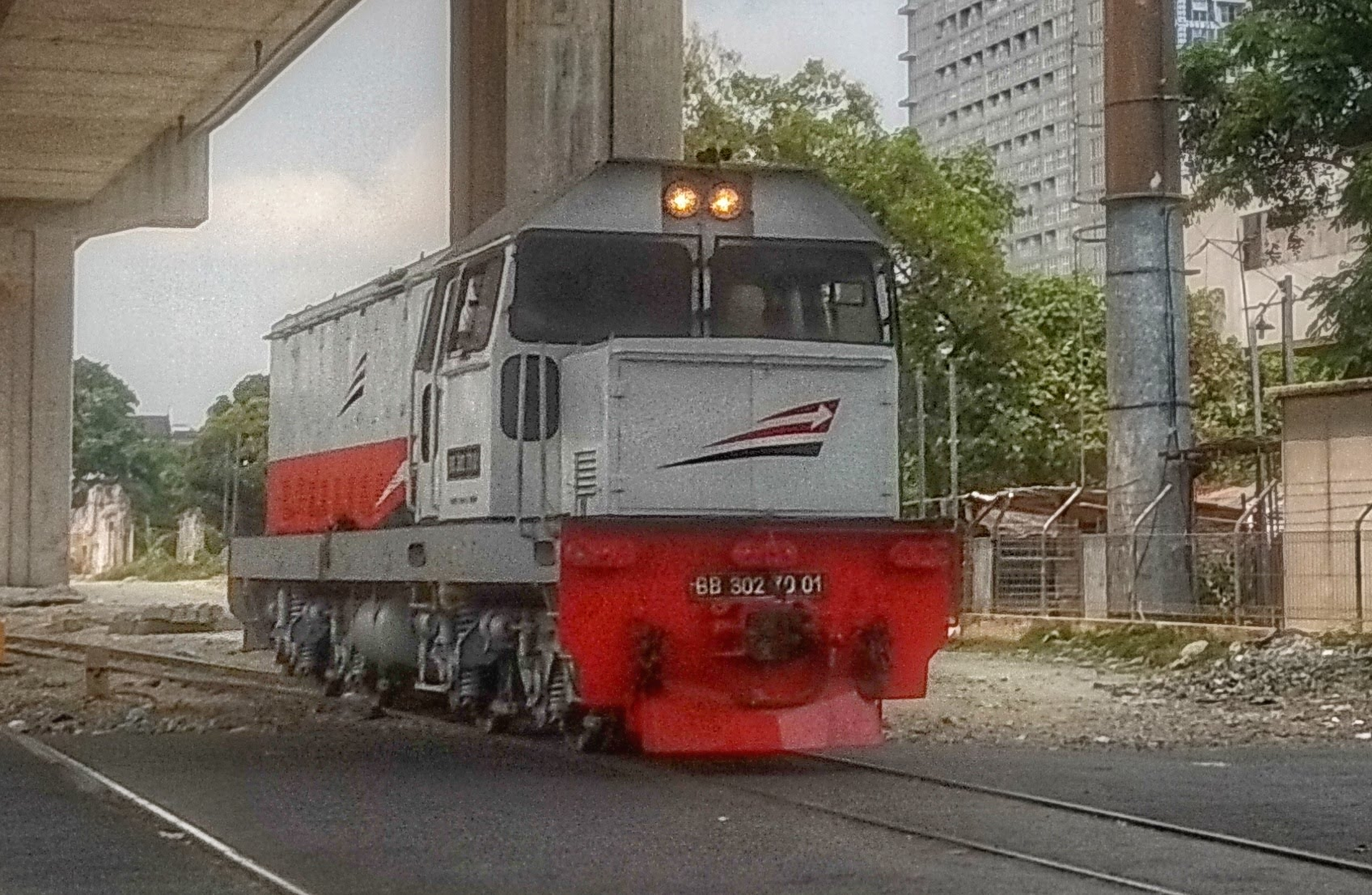
BB302 70 01 in March 2019

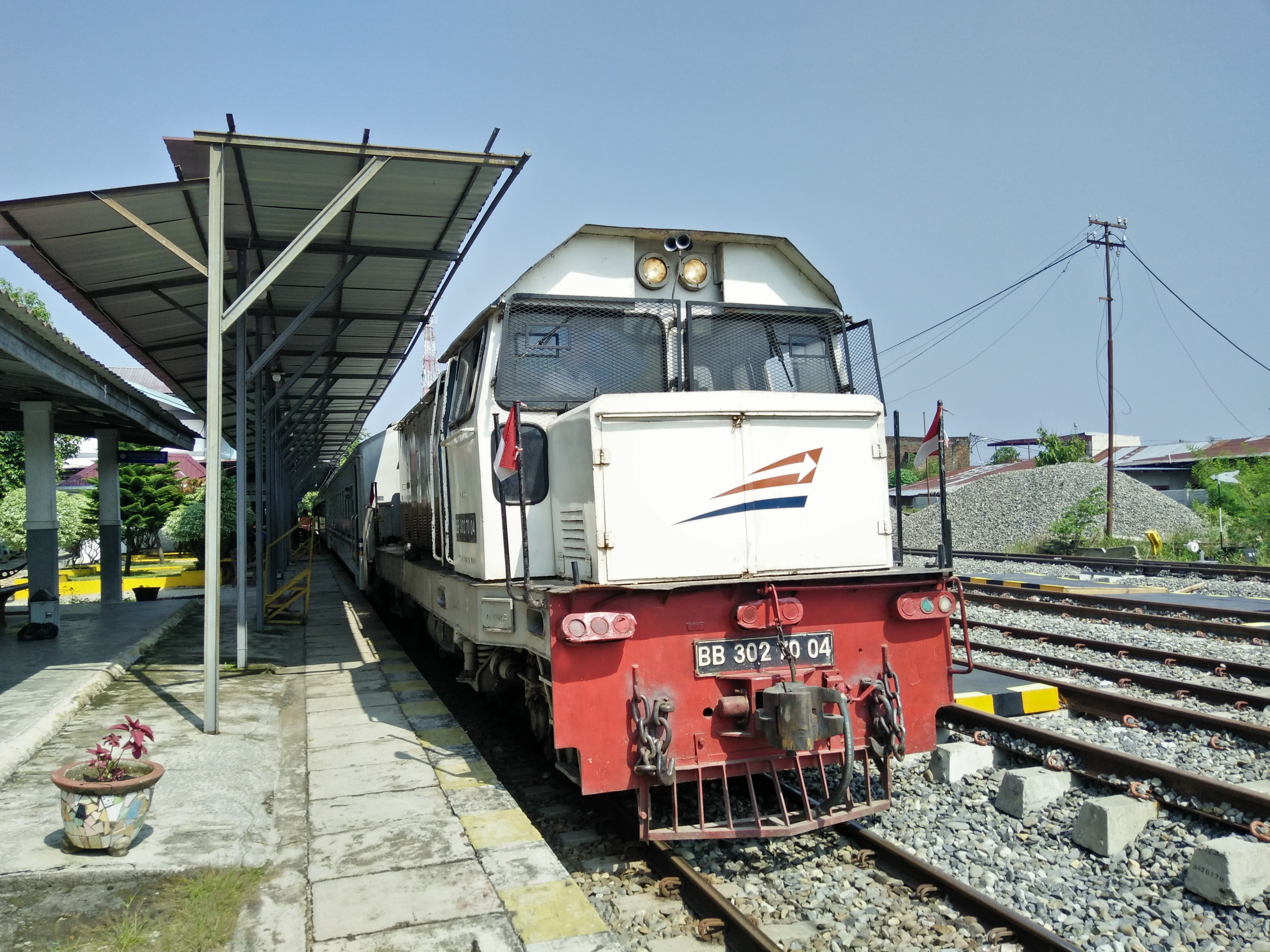
BB302 70 04 hauling Sri Lelawangsa train in 2020

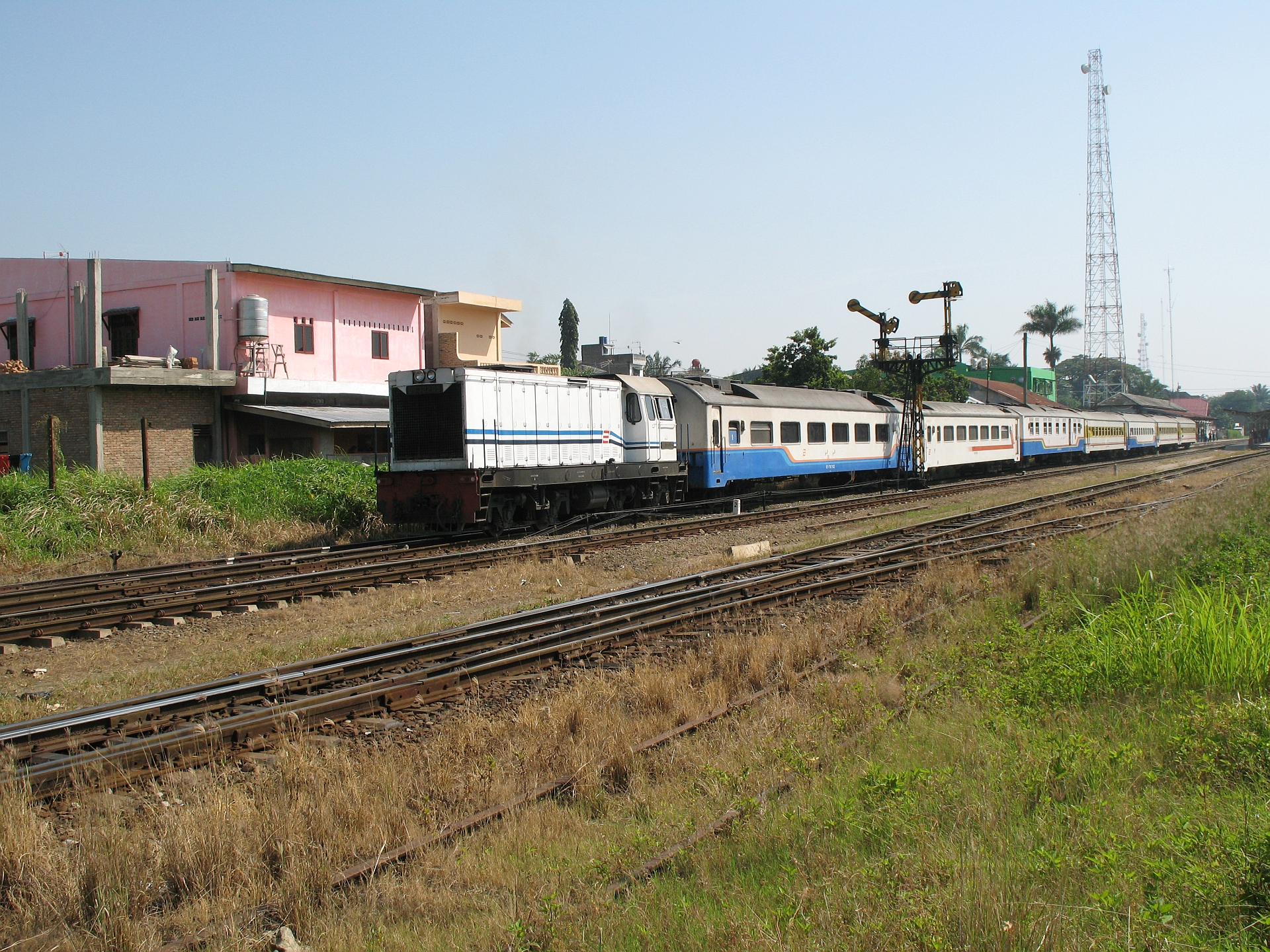
BB 302 70 05 in Tebing Tinggi station, August 2008

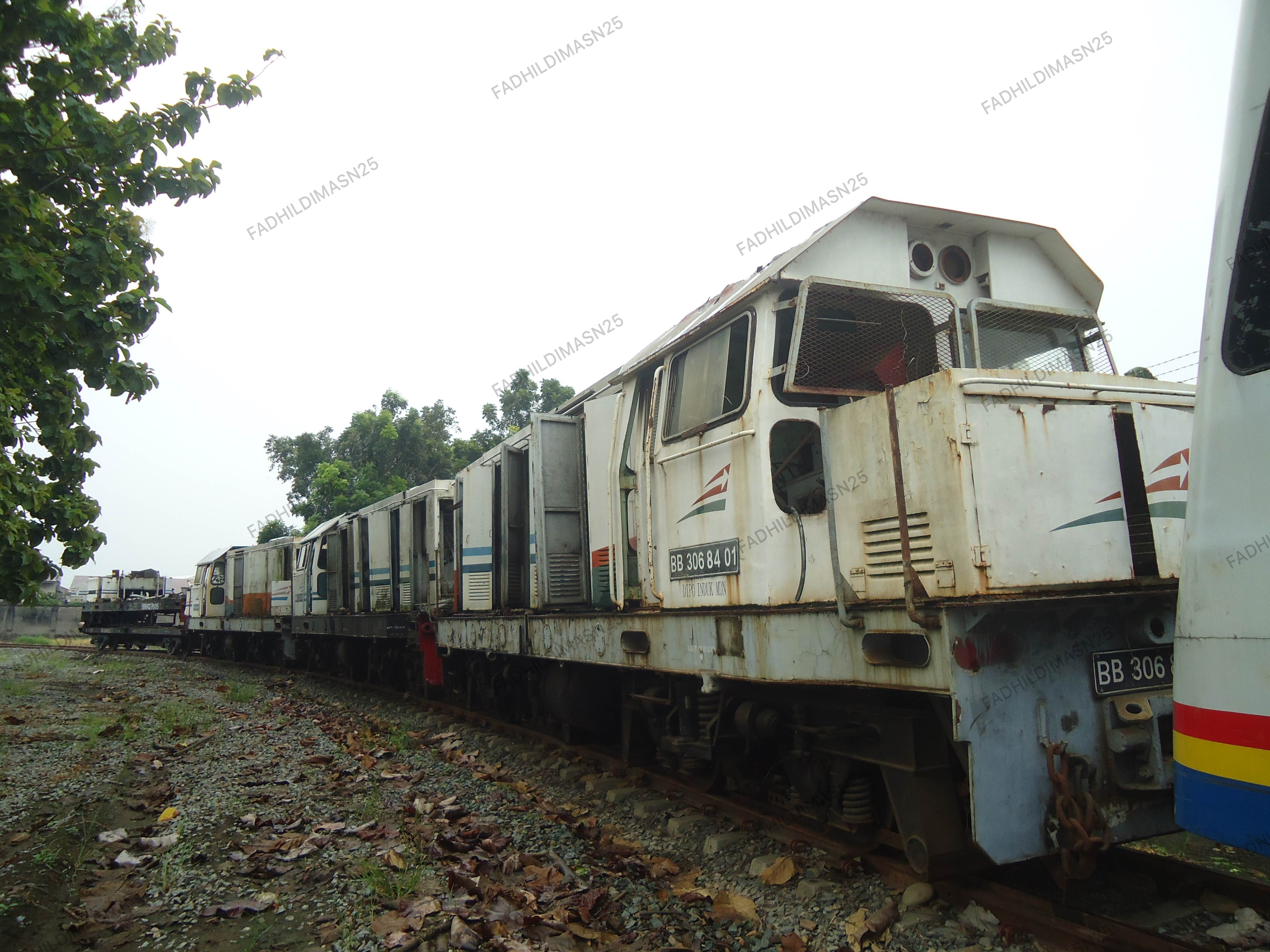
A group of retired BB302, BB303, and BB306 locomotives at Pulu Brayan workshop.

== See also ==
- BB301 class
