= EMD SD40X =

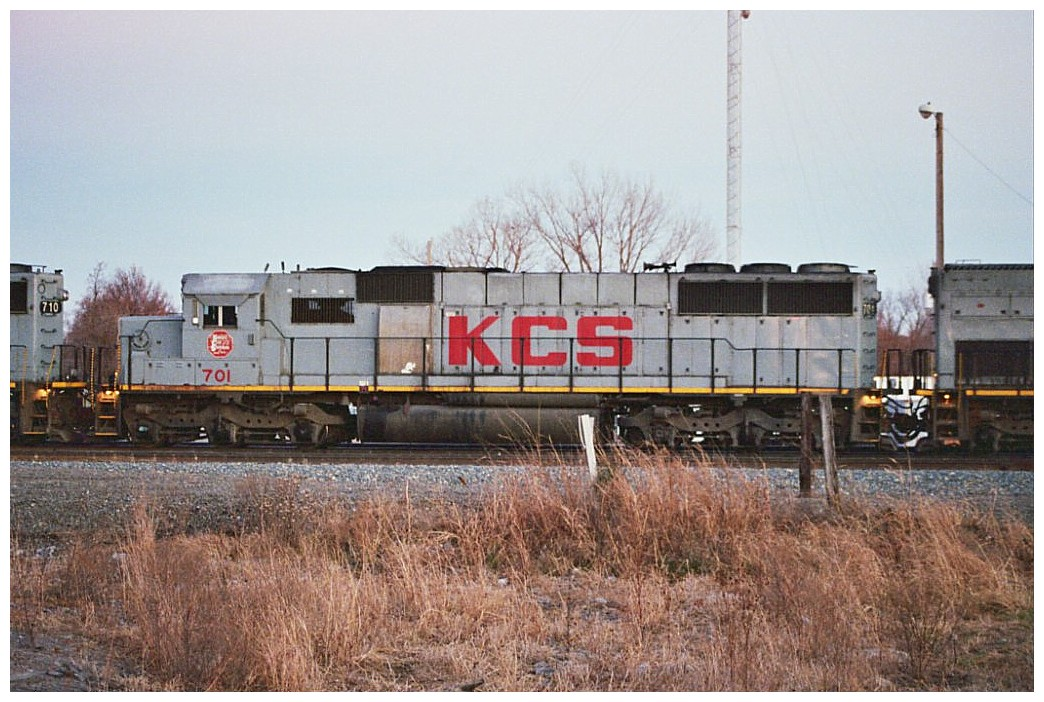
- Kansas City Southern 701
Type and origin
- Power type: Diesel-electric
- Builder: Electro-Motive Division
- Build date: 1964–1965; 1979
- Total produced: 13
Specifications
- Configuration
  - AAR: C-C
- Gauge: 4 ft 8 1/2 in (1,435 mm)
- Prime mover: EMD 645-series 16-645E3
Performance figures
- Power output: 3,500 hp (2,600 kW) (KCS locomotives)
Career
- Restored: 1986-1991
- Disposition: two still survive today (though heavily rebuilt)

The EMD SD40X is a 6-axle experimental diesel-electric locomotive built by General Motors Electro-Motive Division between 1964 and 1965. Nine examples of this locomotive were built for test purposes to test the new 645-series prime mover 16-645E3. After testing, eight were sold to the Union Pacific Railroad and one example to the Gulf, Mobile and Ohio Railroad. This locomotive is an experimental testbed for the production SD40, but built on the shorter SD35 frame. This locomotive was also known as an SD35X.

The designation SD40X was also given to an experimental version of the SD50, built by EMD on an SD40-2 frame. Four examples of this SD40X were built in 1979 and were delivered to the Kansas City Southern as KCS 700-703.

== Original owners ==
Railroad	Quantity	Road numbers	Notes
Gulf, Mobile and Ohio Railroad	1	950	
Kansas City Southern Railway	4	700–703	
Union Pacific Railroad	8	3040–3047	
Total	13		

== See also ==
- List of GM-EMD locomotives
