= Class 319 =

Class 319 may refer to:

- British Rail Class 319
- Renfe Class 319
