= Queensland Railways 2130 class =

Class of Australian Co′Co′ diesel-electric locomotives

Type and origin
- Power type: Diesel-electric
- Builder: Clyde Engineering, Eagle Farm
- Serial number: 74-781 to 74-791
- Model: Electro-Motive Diesel GL26AC
- Build date: 1974-1975
- Total produced: 11
- Rebuild date: 2005-2007
- Number rebuilt: 11
Specifications
- Configuration
  - UIC: Co-Co
- Gauge: 1,067 mm (3 ft 6 in)
- Length: 18.04 metres
- Loco weight: 97.5 tonnes
- Fuel type: Diesel
- Fuel capacity: 7,273 litres
- Prime mover: Electro-Motive Diesel 645E
- Aspiration: Roots blower
- Generator: Electro-Motive Diesel AR10
- Traction motors: Electro-Motive Diesel D29
- Cylinders: V16
- Loco brake: Dynamic
Performance figures
- Maximum speed: 80 km/h
- Power output: 1491 kW
Career
- Operators: Queensland Railways
- Number in class: 11
- Numbers: 2130-2140
- First run: July 1974
- Current owner: Aurizon
- Disposition: 11 in service as 2250 class

The 2130 class was a class of diesel locomotives built by Clyde Engineering, Eagle Farm for Queensland Railways in 1974–1975.

== History ==
The 2130 class were an evolution of the 2141 class. They differed by having a flatter roofline to give better clearance when operating under wires. They were financed by the developers of the Saraji coal mine.

Between 2005 and 2007, all were rebuilt as 2250 class locomotives.
