= Queensland Railways 2250 class =

Class of Australian Co′Co′ diesel-electric locomotives

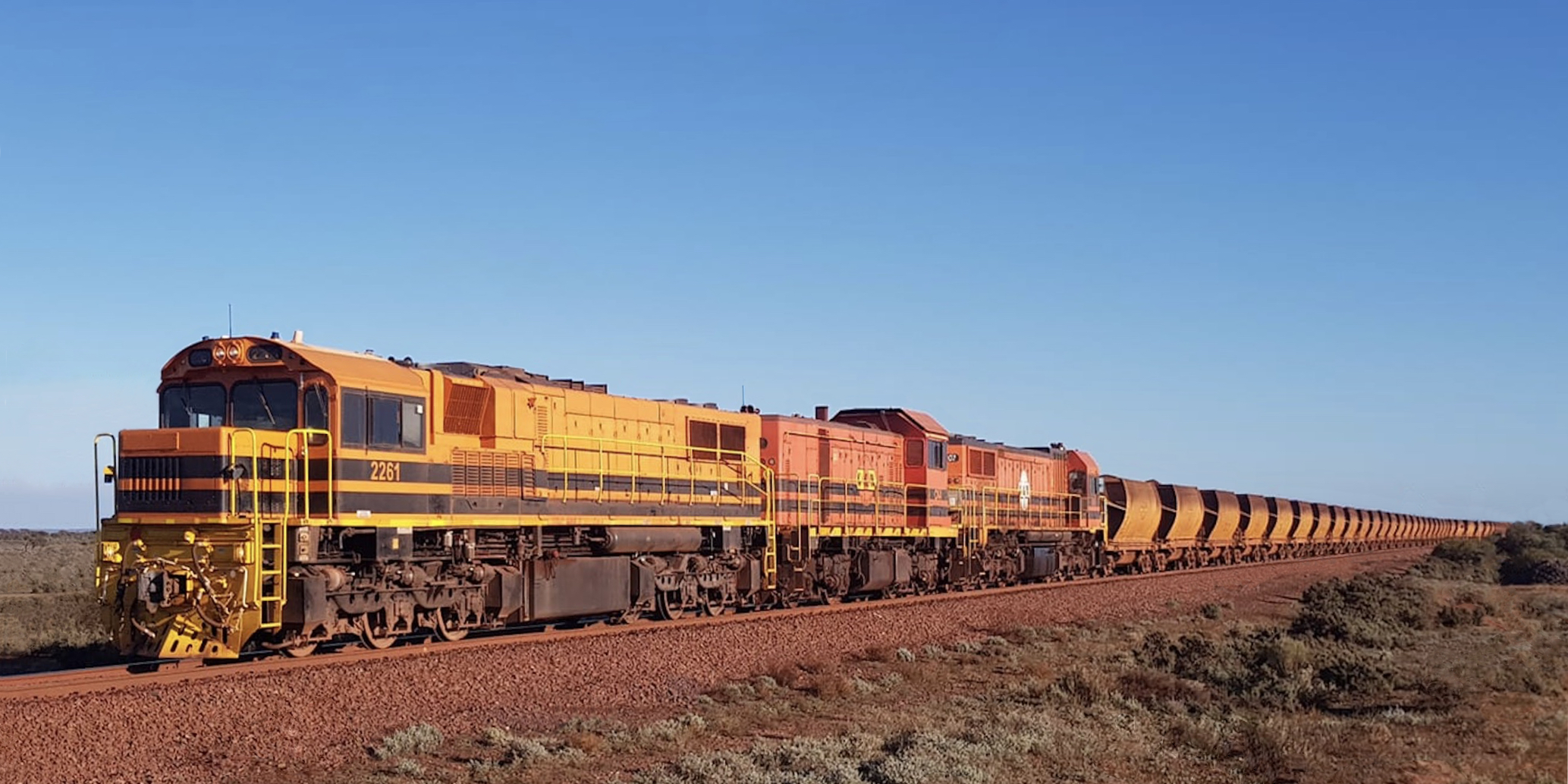
- Queensland Railways 2250 Class
Type and origin
- Power type: Diesel-electric
- Builder: Redbank Railway Workshops
- Model: Electro-Motive Diesel GT22C-3M
- Build date: Original locos built 1972-75, rebuilt 2004
- Total produced: 25
Specifications
- Configuration
  - UIC: Co-Co
- Gauge: 1,067 mm (3 ft 6 in)
- Length: 18.04 m (59 ft 2 in)
- Loco weight: 110 t (110 long tons; 120 short tons)
- Fuel type: Diesel
- Prime mover: Electro-Motive Diesel 645E3C
- Engine type: V12 Diesel engine
- Aspiration: Turbocharged
- Generator: Electro-Motive Diesel AR10G-D14CA5
- Traction motors: Electro-Motive Diesel D31
- Cylinders: 12
Performance figures
- Power output: 2,250 hp (1,680 kW)
Career
- Operators: Aurizon, Transnet, Watco
- Number in class: 25
- Numbers: 2251-2275
- First run: 2004
- Current owner: Aurizon, Transnet, Watco
- Disposition: 20 exported, 5 stored

The 2250 class are a class of diesel locomotives rebuilt by Queensland Rail's Redbank Railway Workshops in 2004.

== History ==
The 2250 class are former 1550 class (6), 2130 class (all 11), and 2141 class (all 8) locomotives that were rebuilt in 2004.

The rebuilds included new cabs, Dash 2 electronics, ZTR traction control equipment, EMD 645E engines from 1502s and the replacement of the roots blower supercharger with a turbocharger. They were also ballasted to 110 tonnes (110 long tons; 120 short tons) as they only operate on heavy coal trains.

20 locomotives were sold to Transnet in South Africa in 2014.

In July 2019, 5 were brought back into Australia for use on the iron ore railway to Whyalla steelworks.
