= EMD SD38 =

Model of American diesel locomotive

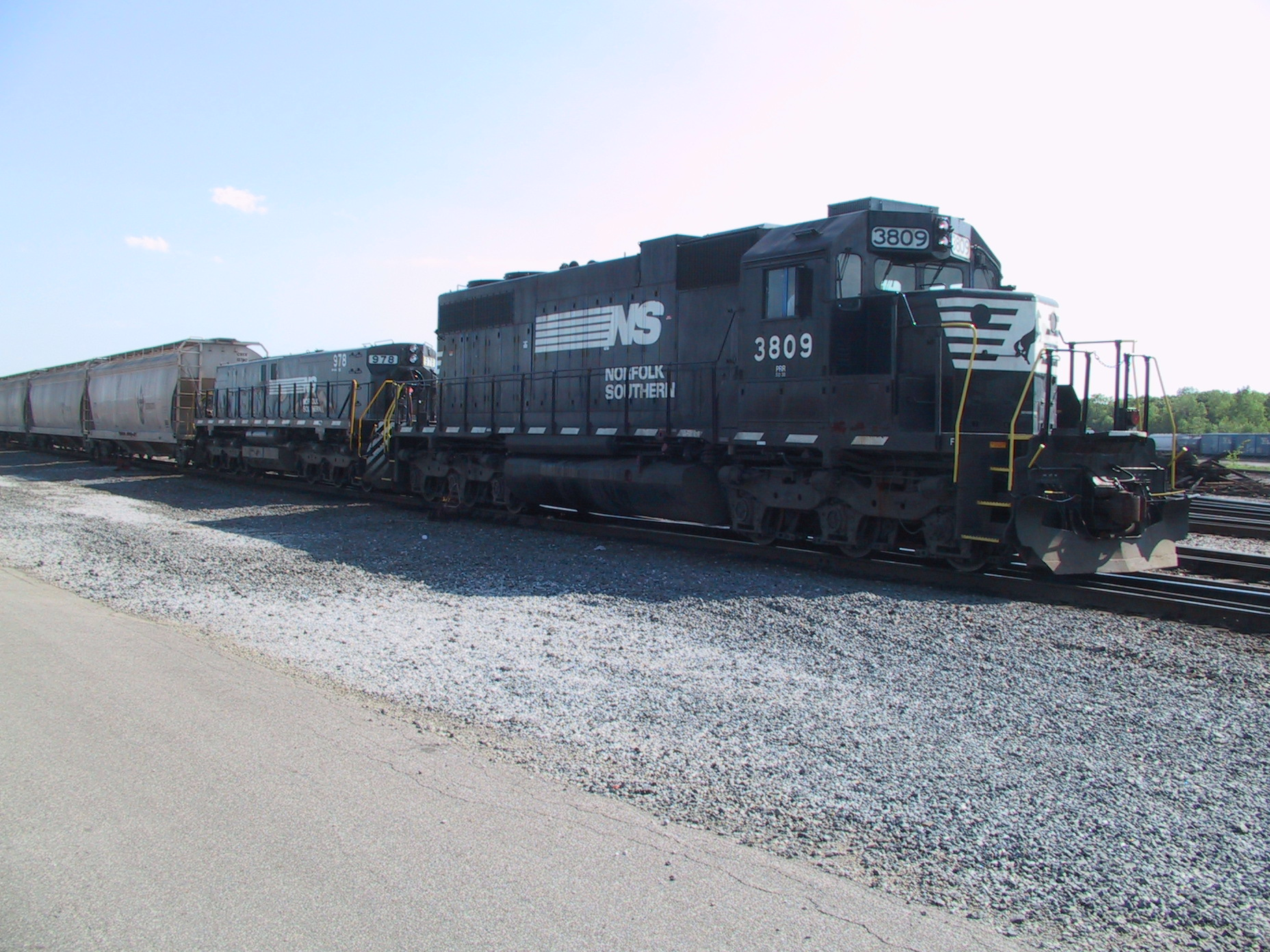
- Norfolk Southern #3809.
Type and origin
- Power type: Diesel-electric
- Builder: General Motors Electro-Motive Division (EMD)
- Model: SD38, SDP38, SD38M
- Build date: May 1967 – October 1971
- Total produced: 108 SD38; 40 SDP38
Specifications
- Configuration
  - AAR: C-C
- Gauge: 4 ft 8 1/2 in (1,435 mm) standard gauge
- Fuel capacity: 3,200 US gal (12,000 L; 2,700 imp gal)
- Prime mover: EMD 16-645E
- Engine type: V16 diesel
- Cylinders: 16
Performance figures
- Power output: 2,000 hp (1.5 MW)

The EMD SD38 is a 6-axle diesel-electric locomotive built by General Motors Electro-Motive Division between May 1967 and October 1971. It had an EMD 645 16-cylinder engine generating 2,000 horsepower (1.5 MW), compared to the turbocharged EMD 645E3 V-16 engine that produced 3000 horsepower. Aside from the 3-axle trucks and a longer frame to accommodate them, the SD38 was identical to the GP38; the SD38 had the same frame as the SD39, SD40 and SD45. 52 were built for American railroads, one was built for a Canadian railroad, four were exported to a mining firm in Jamaica and seven were exported to a mining firm in Venezuela. The SD38 was succeeded by a Dash 2 version called the EMD SD38-2.

== SD38 operators ==
Railroad	Quantity	Road numbers	Notes
Bessemer and Lake Erie Railroad	3	861-863	862 was sold to DMIR. Later was bought back by BLE. Still is a SD38 and is the only one of its kind of CNs roster.
Detroit, Toledo and Ironton Railroad	5	250-254	To Grand Trunk Western 6250–6254; 253 and 254 still in service as Reading and Northern Railroad Nos. 2003 and 2004
Elgin, Joliet and Eastern Railway	6	650-655	650 sold to CITI Rail in 2011, 654 sold to Hartwell railroad in 2011, 651–653, and 655 sold to DMIR in 1992/1993.
Kaiser Bauxite	4	5101–5104	Jamaica/Now called Noranda Bauxite Limited (NBL)
McCloud River Railroad	3	36-38	36 & 38 on MCR property as of July 2017, 37 Now On Dakota Southern Railway
Orinoco Mining Company	7	1021–1027	Venezuela
Penn Central	35	6925-6959	All went to Conrail with same #'s. 21 to Norfolk Southern, 13 to CSX
RFFSA (Brazil)	45	3601-3645	model SD38M on a shortened 60 ft 10 in (18.55 m) frame - 34 units in service
Totals	108		

== Preservation ==
- Elgin, Joliet and Eastern Railway #654 was sold to the Hartwell Railroad in Social Circle, Georgia in 2013, where it sees regular freight service on the railroad's 10 mile track from Monroe to Social Circle, still in its original EJ&E paint. While not officially classified as being preserved, railfans consider it as a "preserved relic".

== SDP38 operators ==
Railroad	Quantity	Road Numbers	Notes
Korean National Railways	40	6201-6240	
Total	40		

An M version of SD38 was built for the Brazil Federal Railways (RFFSA - Rede Ferroviária Federal S. A.).

Forty of a passenger version, the SDP38, were built for the Korean National Railroad in May–July 1967. The units were numbered 6351–6390. It was later changed to 6201–6240.
