= EMD SD38-2 =

North American class of diesel-electric locomotive

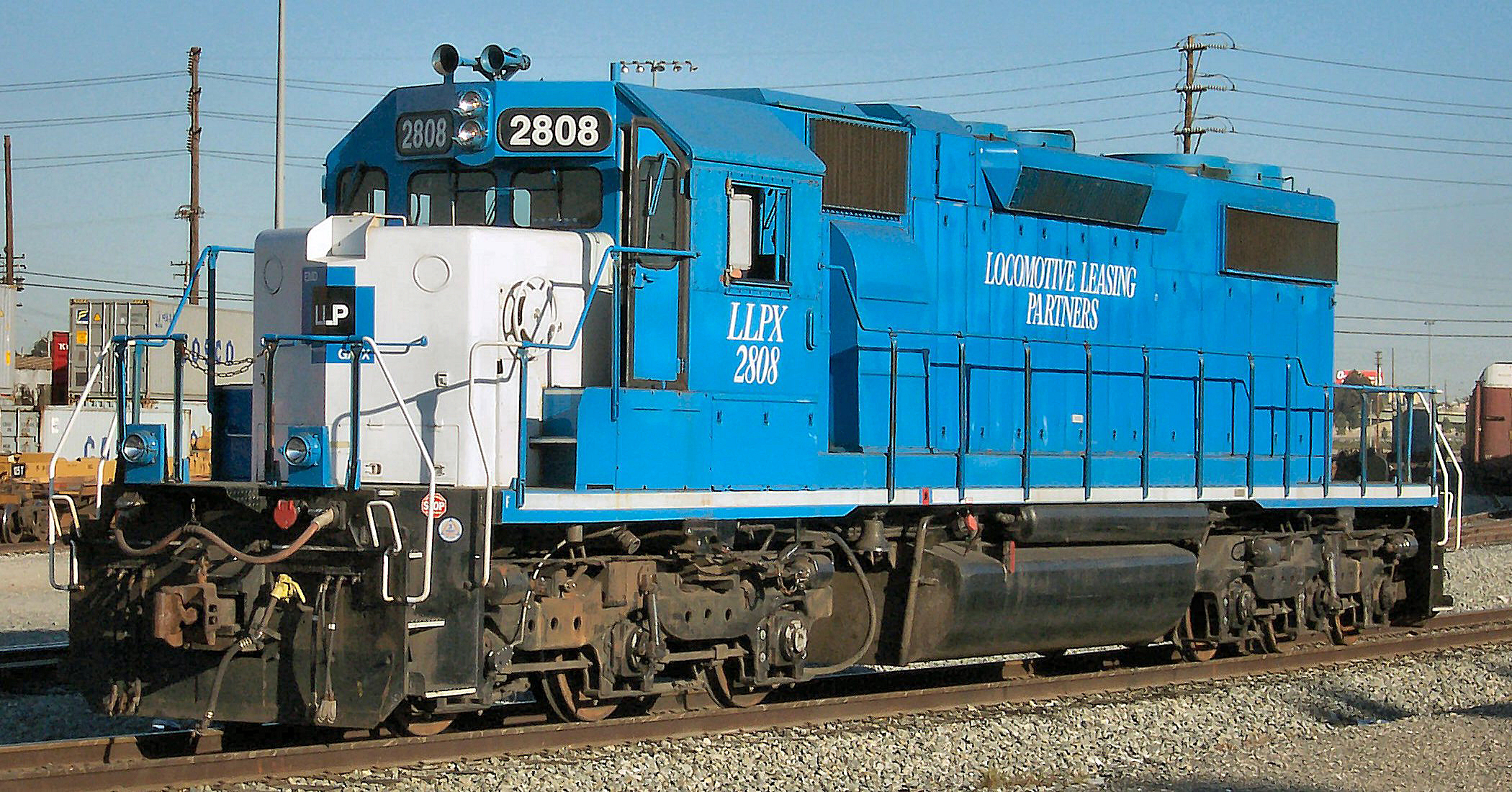
- LLPX 2808 in February 2005
Type and origin
- Power type: Diesel-electric
- Builder: General Motors Electro-Motive Division (EMD); General Motors Diesel, Canada
- Model: SD38-2
- Build date: 1972–1979
- Total produced: 90
Specifications
- Configuration
  - AAR: C-C
  - UIC: Co′Co′
  - Commonwealth: Co-Co
- Gauge: 4 ft 8 1/2 in (1,435 mm) standard gauge (Note: Except for two units built for the Jari Railway in Brazil, which were built to a 5 ft 3 in (1,600 mm) gauge)
- Trucks: 6-Wheel
- Wheel diameter: 40 in (1.0 m)
- Minimum curve: 57°
- Wheelbase: 13 ft 7 in (4,140 mm)
- Pivot centres: 43 ft 6 in (13,260 mm) between bolsters;
- Length: 68 ft 10 in (20,980 mm)
- Width: 10 ft 3 in (3.12 m) over cab width
- Height: 15 ft 7.5 in (4.763 m) over top cab
- Loco weight: 368,000 lb (167,000 kg)
- Fuel type: Diesel
- Fuel capacity: 3,200–4,000 US gal (12,000–15,000 L; 2,700–3,300 imp gal)
- Lubricant cap.: 243 US gal (920 L; 202 imp gal)
- Coolant cap.: 240 US gal (910 L; 200 imp gal)
- Sandbox cap.: 56 ft^{3} (1,600 L)
- Prime mover: EMD 16-645E
- RPM
  - RPM low idle: 200
  - RPM idle: 315
  - Maximum RPM: 950
- Engine type: V16 Two-stroke diesel
- Aspiration: Roots-blown
- Alternator: Delco 14 or AR10E1-D14
- Generator: Main: GM - AR10E1-D14; Auxiliary: Delco A8102
- Traction motors: 6 × D77/78 DC
- Cylinders: 16
- Cylinder size: 8.5 in (220 mm) x 10 in (250 mm)
- Gear ratio: 62:15
- MU working: Yes
- Loco brake: Air, Dynamic
- Train brakes: Westinghouse 26L Air Brake
Performance figures
- Maximum speed: 65 mph (105 km/h)
- Power output: 2,000 hp (1,500 kW)
- Tractive effort
  - Starting: 90,000 lbf (41,000 kgf) @ 25%
  - Continuous: 82,100 lbf (37,200 kgf) @ 6.6 mph (10.6 km/h)
Career
- Locale: North America, South America
- Disposition: Many still in service, One selected for preservation

The EMD SD38-2 is a model of six-axle diesel-electric locomotive built by General Motors Electro-Motive Division (EMD) from 1972 to 1979. EMD built 90 of these medium road-switchers, which were used in both yard and mainline roles. Part of the EMD Dash 2 line, the SD38-2 was an upgraded SD38 with modular electronic control systems, HT-C trucks, and many other detail improvements. The locomotive's power was provided by an EMD 16-645E 16-cylinder engine, which could generate 2,000 horsepower (1,500 kilowatts). These units were constructed with either 3,200 or 4,000 US gal (12,000 or 15,000 L; 2,700 or 3,300 imp gal) fuel tanks and were available with or without dynamic brakes. It shared the same 64-foot-8-inch (19.71 m) frame as the SD40-2 and SD45-2, which gives it a length over couplers of 68 feet 10 inches (20.98 m).

== Original owners ==
Railroad	Quantity	Road numbers	Notes
BC Hydro	3	382-384	
Bessemer and Lake Erie Railroad	13	870-879, 890-892	Unit no. 878 preserved
Chicago and Illinois Midland Railway	6	70-75	
Chicago and North Western Transportation Company	10	6650-6659	
Duluth, Missabe and Iron Range Railway	5	209-213	
Elgin, Joliet and Eastern Railway	13	656-668	
Jari Railway	2	10-11	Export to Brazil, 5 ft 3 in (1,600 mm) gauge
Louisville and Nashville Railroad	5	4500-4504	
McCloud River Railroad	1	39	
Northern Alberta Railway	4	401-404	Built by GMDD
Orinoco Mining Company	5	1028–1032	Export, Venezuela
Reserve Mining	9	1237–1245	
St. Louis–San Francisco Railway	4	296-299	
Southern Pacific Transportation Company	6	2971–2976	
United States Steel	1	1	
Yankeetown Dock	3	20-22	
Totals	90		

== See also ==
- List of GM-EMD locomotives
- List of GMD Locomotives
