= EMD SD50 series =

American diesel-electric locomotive

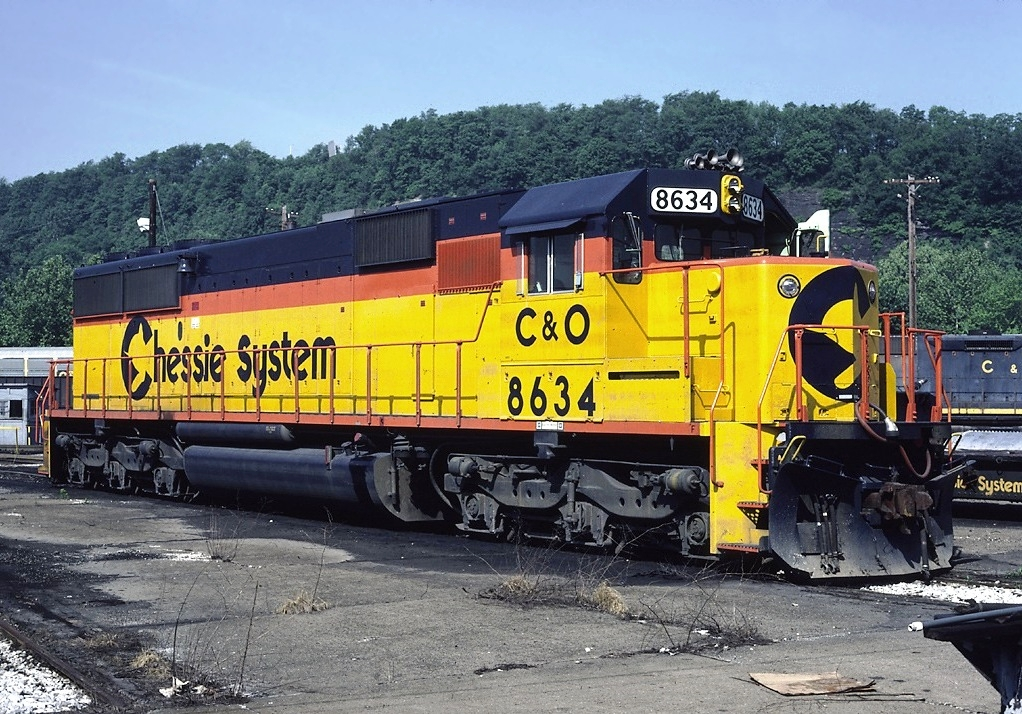
- Chessie System SD50 no. 8634, May 1986
Type and origin
- Power type: Diesel-electric
- Builder: Electro-Motive Diesel; General Motors Diesel; Clyde Engineering
- Model: SD50
- Build date: December 1980 – July 1987. 2005 [SDL50]
- Total produced: 523
Specifications
- Configuration
  - UIC: Co'Co'
- Gauge: 1,435 mm (4 ft 8 1/2 in)
- Length: 71 ft 2 in (21.69 m)
- Fuel type: Diesel
- Fuel capacity: 3,500 U.S. gal (13,000 L)
- Lubricant cap.: 283 U.S. gal (1,070 L)
- Coolant cap.: 250 U.S. gal (950 L)
- Sandbox cap.: 56 cu ft (1,600 L)
- Prime mover: EMD 16-645F3B
- RPM
  - Maximum RPM: 950
- Engine type: V16 diesel
- Aspiration: Turbocharged
- Alternator: main : AR16/D18 (3,500), AR11 (3,600)
- Traction motors: EMD 87Y (3,500), EMD 87A (3,600)
- Cylinders: 16
- Transmission: Diesel-electric
- Gear ratio: 70:17
- MU working: Yes
- Loco brake: Westinghouse, Dynamic brake
- Train brakes: Air braked
Performance figures
- Maximum speed: 70 mph (110 km/h)
- Power output: 3,500 hp (2,610 kW) at 950 rpm; increased to 3,600 hp (2,685 kW) November 1984.
Career
- Operators: See Original buyers
- Disposition: Some in service, some retired, one preserved

The EMD SD50 is a series of 3,600-horsepower (2,680 kW) diesel-electric locomotives built by General Motors Electro-Motive Division. It was introduced in May 1981 as part of EMD's "50 Series"; production ceased in January 1986. The SD50 was a transitional model between EMD's Dash 2 series which was produced throughout the 1970s and the microprocessor-equipped SD60 and SD70 locomotives. A total of 523 were built. This included 421 standard cab locomotives for the North American market, 60 built by GMD with a "Draper taper", six short-frame prototypes built before the standard model, 31 built for Saudi Arabia, and additional five being built for use in Australia.

== History ==
The SD50 was produced in response to increasingly tough competition from GE Transportation, whose Dash 7 line was proving quite successful with railroads. While EMD's SD40-2 was a reliable and trusted product, GE's line included locomotives up to 3,600 hp (2,685 kW) with more modern technology, as well as very competitive finance and maintenance deals. EMD responded throughout the SD50 program by offering discounts on large orders.

The GM-EMD locomotives that immediately preceded the SD50, the 3,600 hp (2,685 kW) SD45 and SD45-2, used huge, 20-cylinder engines that consumed large amounts of fuel and suffered from reliability problems when first introduced. Demand for the 45 series dropped sharply after the 1970s fuel crisis. The SD50 used an updated version of the V16 645 from the SD40-2, uprated to 3,500 hp (2,600 kW) at 950 rpm from 3,000 hp (2,240 kW) at 900 rpm, and uprated again in November 1984 to 3,600 hp (2,685 kW). This proved to be a step too far; the 50 series models were plagued by engine and electrical system problems which harmed EMD's sales and reputation.

Compared with their predecessors, the SD50 had a longer frame and a substantially longer long hood. In addition, the resistors for the dynamic brake grid were moved from their location on previous models above the prime mover to a new, cooler location in front of the engine compartment air intakes, closer to the electrical switchgear. This increased their separation from other systems, simplifying maintenance for the prime mover and the electrical system.

One former SD50 engineer praised the locomotives' wheel-slip control system and dynamic braking power, stating "they were able to give more adhesion than a SD40-2".

== Technical ==
The SD50 is powered by V16 16-645F3 series diesel engine driving either an EMD AR11A-D14 or an EMD AR16A-D18 traction alternator. The power generated by the traction alternator drove 6 EMD D87 traction motors rated at 1170 amps each.

The SD50 was available with multiple traction motor gearing ratios and wheel sizes, the most common of which was the 70:17 ratio with 40-inch (1,016 mm) wheels, which allowed for a top speed of 70 mph (110 km/h). Other gearing options for the SD50 with 40-inch (1,016 mm) wheels included 69:18 for 76 mph (122 km/h), 67:19 for 82 mph (132 km/h) and 66:20 for 88 mph (142 km/h). The SD50 was also available with 42-inch (1,067 mm) wheels.

The SD50 was also available with either HT-C trucks (identified with a hydraulic shock on the side of the middle axle of each truck) or the earlier Flexicoil trucks. Some investigators implicated the HT-C truck in derailments of Amtrak's SDP40Fs, so Conrail chose the Flexicoil C trucks for their SD40-2s and their first order of SD50s—the only customer to do so. The controversy surrounding the HT-C truck was eventually disproved, and Conrail chose HT-C trucks for their second order of SD50s and SD60s.

== SD50S ==
The SD50S ("short frame") were prototype units built in December 1980. They were shorter than production locomotives by approximately 2 feet (0.61 m). Six were built, all of which were sold to the Norfolk & Western and eventually passed to Norfolk Southern. They were withdrawn in the early 2000s as non-standard. Two were rebuilt in 2008 as "SD40E" models by Norfolk Southern's Juniata Shops, along with several standard length SD50s.

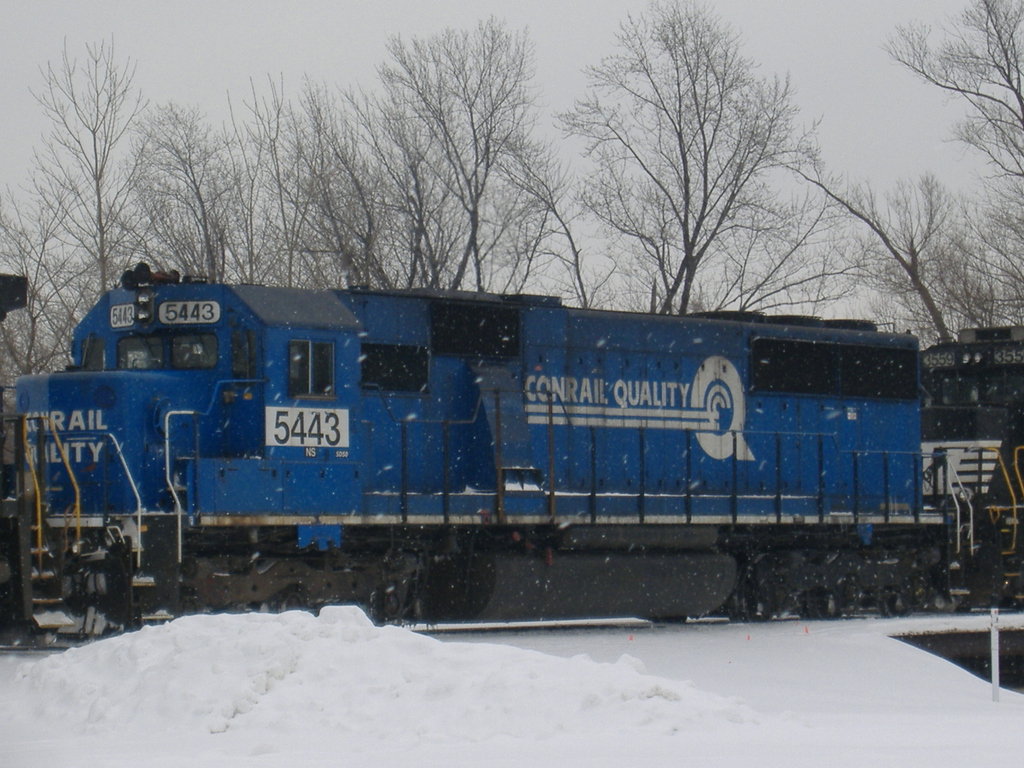
NS 5443, an SD50

The SD50S designation was also used for five locomotives built by EMD Australian licensee Clyde Engineering, Adelaide for Hamersley Iron. Shorter than production SD50s, they were equipped with a special double cab roof for insulation against the hot Australian desert sun in the Pilbara region. Withdrawn in November 1995, they were sold to National Railway Equipment Company and exported to the United States in February 1999 and used in national lease service. They were subsequently sold to the Utah Railway in June 2001. In June 2017, 6063 and 6064 were sold to the Chicago, Fort Wayne & Eastern Railroad, 6064 was relocated by Genesee & Wyoming to the Indiana & Ohio Railway and renumbered 5016 and 5017.

== SDL50 ==
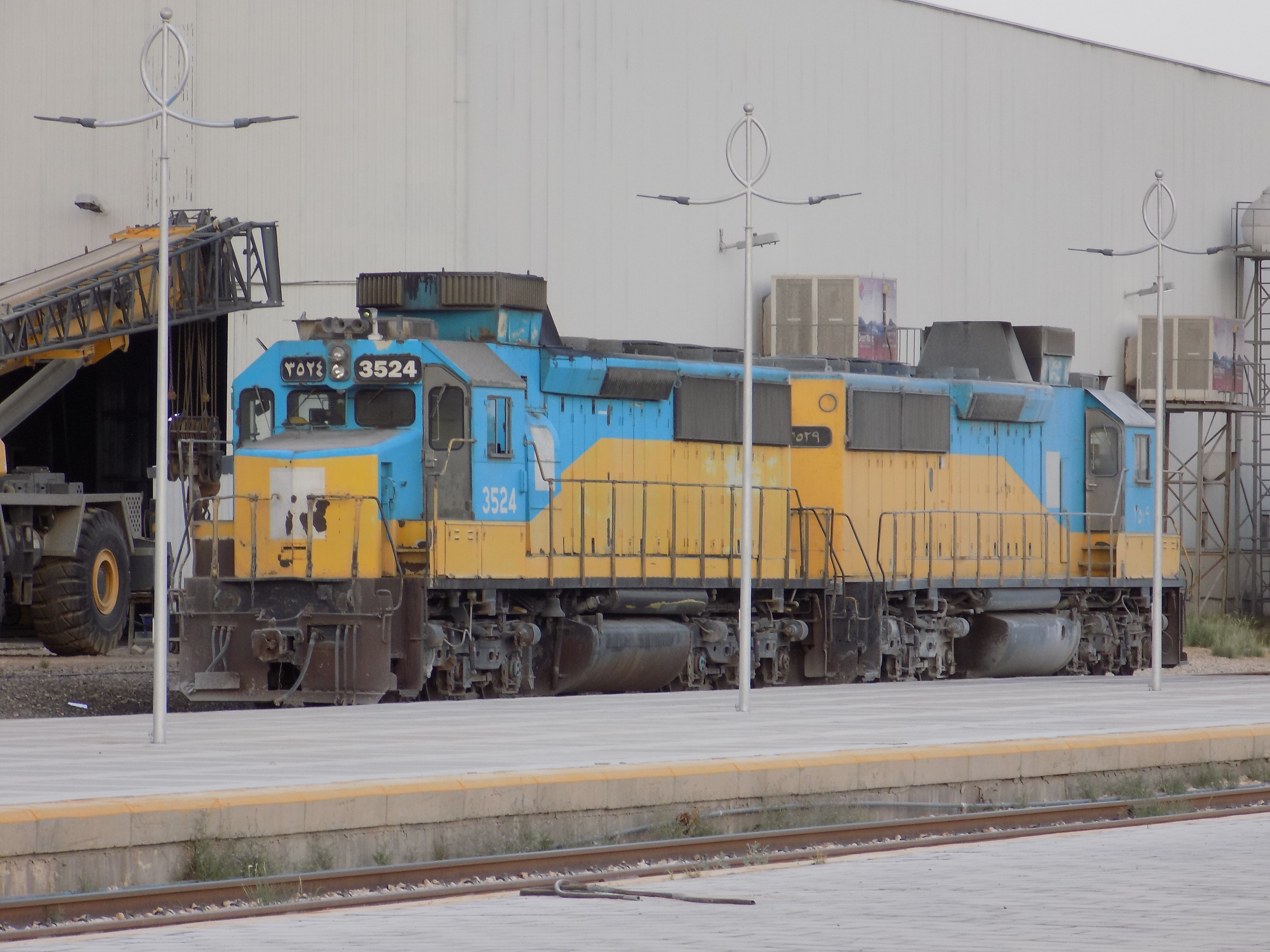
SRO 3524 and 3529, both SDL50s, at Riyadh East station in 2024.

The SDL50 ("L" standing for "lightweight") was an export-only version of the SD50, designed to operate in harsh desert climates. The model was ordered only by the Saudi Government Railways Organization (later the Saudi Railways Organization, now Saudi Arabia Railways) in Saudi Arabia, for operation on the Dammam-Riyadh railroad. A total of 31 SDL50s were built in four batches from 1981 to 2005, numbered as the 3500-series.

Like most other SD50 models, the SDL50s use an EMD 16-645F3 prime mover rated at 3,500 horsepower (2,600 kW). Modifications for operation in the desert include an aerodynamic front nose, extra-large air filters to keep out dust and sand, as well as special sealing in order to protect the locomotive traction motors and other components.

== SD50F ==
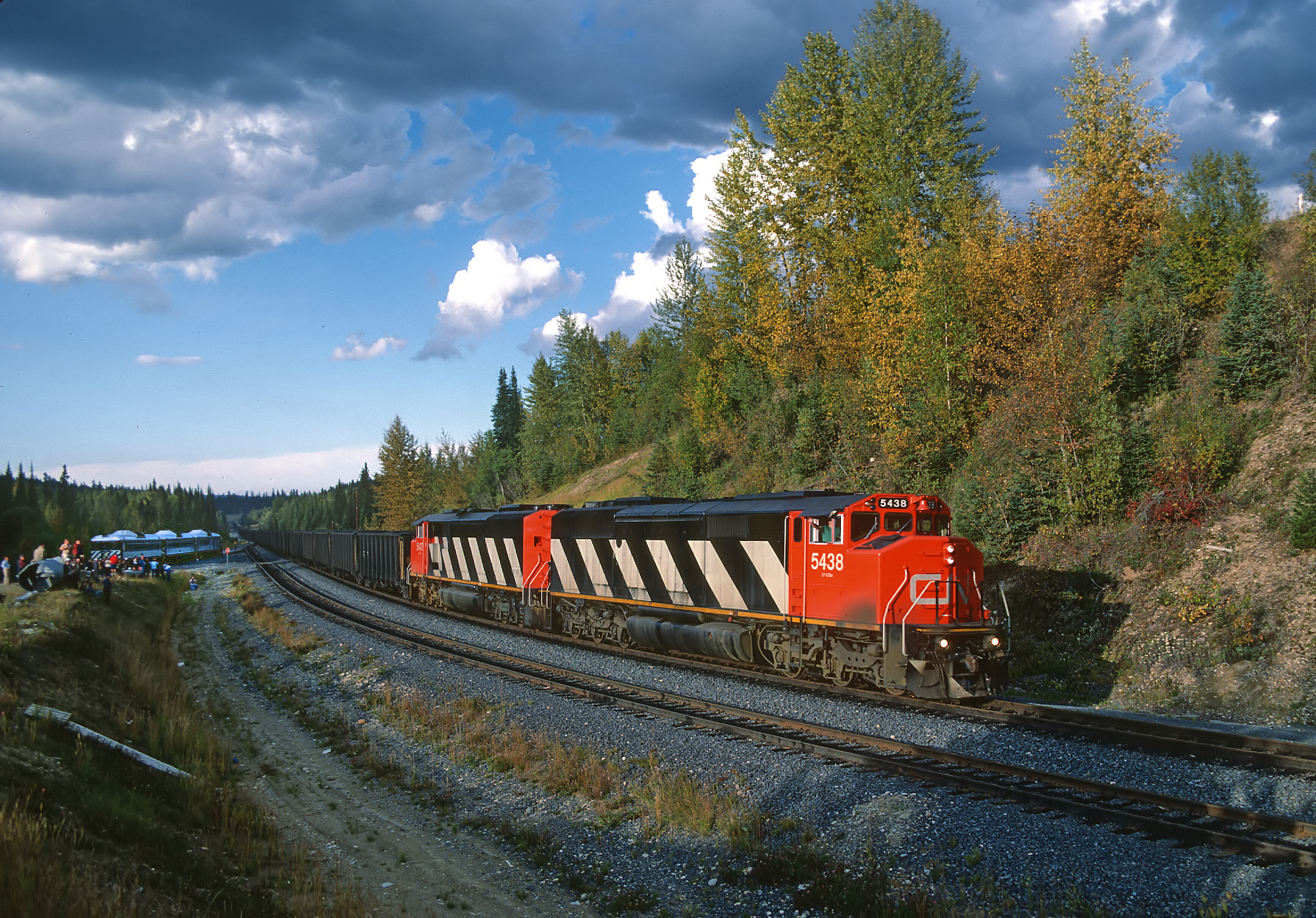
CN 5438, an SD50F

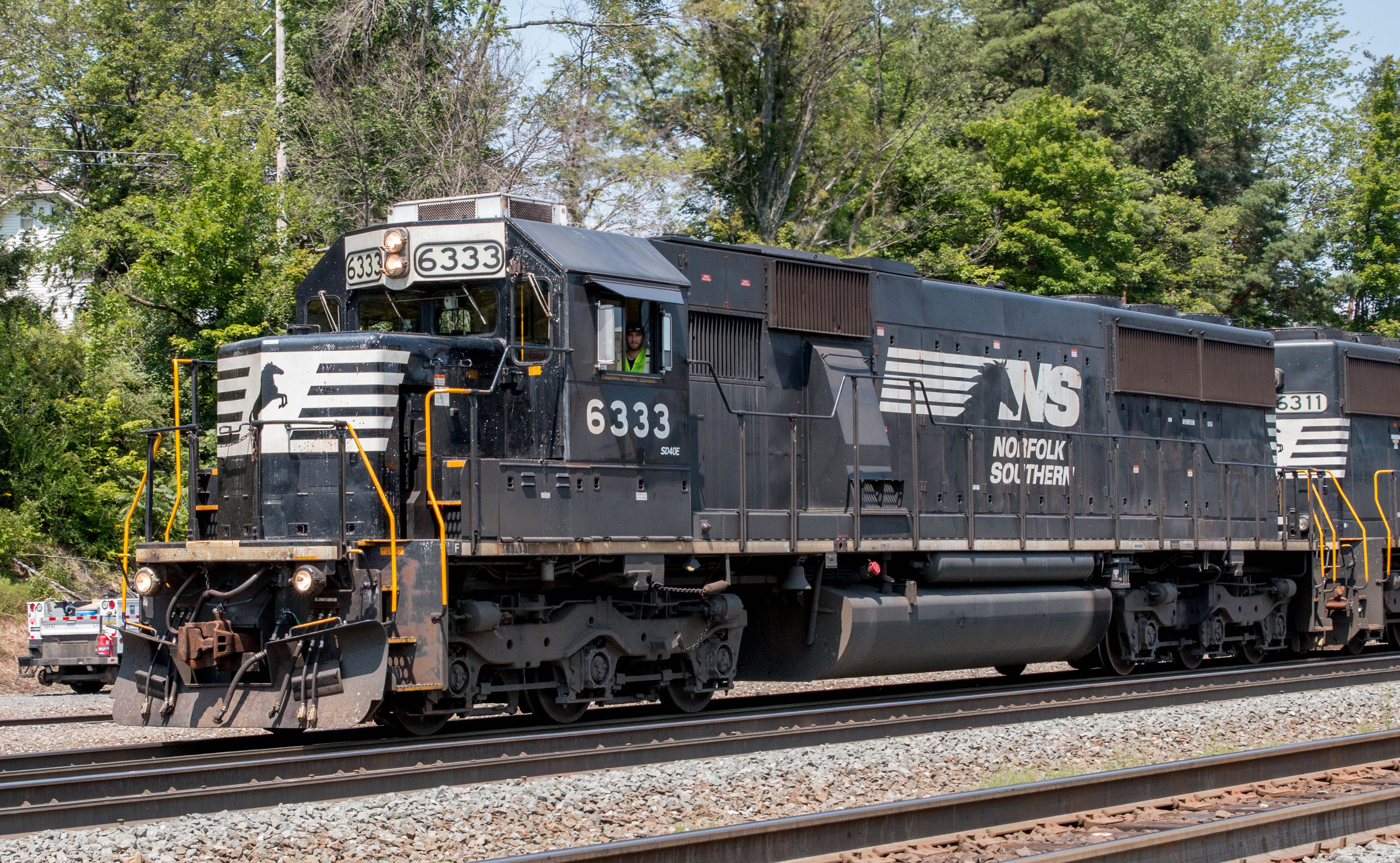
NS 6333, an SD40E rebuild, at Cresson, Pennsylvania.

The SD50F was a Canadian cowl unit version equipped with a "Draper taper" (inset section aft of cab for limited rear visibility). Sixty were built for the Canadian National Railway as road numbers 5400–5459. Early engine problems resulted in a temporary down-rating to 3,300 horsepower (2,500 kW). Eventually the units were re-rated to 3,500 horsepower (2,600 kW); however, like their U.S. cousins, they continued to suffer from relatively low reliability, frequently suffering engine, power assembly, and crankshaft failures.

== Original owners ==
Image	Railroad	Qty.	Road numbers	Notes
SD50
	Baltimore & Ohio (Chessie System)	20	8576–8595	8595 famously known for being the very last locomotive ever built for the Railroad
	Chicago & North Western	35	7000–7034	To Union Pacific. 7009 donated to the Illinois Railway Museum
	Chesapeake & Ohio (Chessie System)	43	8553–8575, 8624–8643	To CSX Transportation
	Conrail	135	6700–6834	To Norfolk Southern and CSX Transportation. Most NS units rebuilt to SD40Es
	Denver & Rio Grande Western	17	5501–5517	To Southern Pacific, to Union Pacific.
	Kansas City Southern Railway	10	704–713	
	Missouri Pacific Railroad	60	5000–5059	To Union Pacific
	Seaboard System Railroad	81	8500–8552, 8596–8623	To CSX Transportation
	Norfolk Southern	20	6506–6525	
SD50S
	Hamersley Iron	5	6060–6064	
	Norfolk & Western Railway	6	6500–6505	SD50S short frame; to Norfolk Southern
SD50F
	Canadian National	60	5400–5459	Cowl units
SDL50
	Saudi Railways Organization	31	3500-3530	Modified for operation in the desert
Totals	523			

== Rebuilds ==
A number of SD50s have been rebuilt into the equivalent of SD40-2s. The Dash 2 features are already contained within the SD50. The units are derated from 3,500 hp (2,600 kW) at 950 rpm to 3,000 hp (2,200 kW) at 900 rpm. This is actually a quite simple change to the locomotive's Woodward PGE engine governor. From 2008 to 2013, Norfolk Southern rebuilt their SD50s into this standard; designated as SD40Es.

== Preservation ==
- Chicago & North Western #7009 is preserved at the Illinois Railway Museum in Union, Illinois. It is believed by the museum to be the first preserved SD50.

== See also ==
- List of GM-EMD locomotives
- List of GMD Locomotives
