= EMD GP15 =

Model of 310 American 1500hp Bo′Bo′ diesel-electric locomotives

EMD GP15 (-1/T/AC)
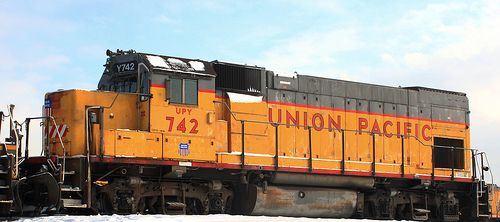
- Union Pacific Yard (UPY) 742, a GP15-1 idles in Union Pacific's Global 1 intermodal yard in Chicago, IL.
Type and origin
- Power type: Diesel-electric
- Builder: General Motors Electro-Motive Division (EMD)
- Model: GP15-1; GP15T; GP15AC
- Build date: June 1976 – March 1982 (-1); October 1982 – April 1983 (T); November & December 1982 (AC)
- Total produced: 310 (-1); 28 (T); 34 (AC)
Specifications
- Configuration
  - AAR: B-B
- Gauge: 4 ft 8 1/2 in (1,435 mm) standard gauge
- Driver dia.: 40 in (1,016 mm)
- Minimum curve: 120 ft (36.6 m)
- Length
  - Over couplers: 54 ft 11 in (16.74 m)
- Width: 10 ft 3 1/8 in (3.127 m) (over hand rail supports)
- Height: 15 ft 2 1/2 in (4.636 m)
- Loco weight: 246,000 lb (111,600 kg) (-1); 244,000 lb (110,677 kg) (T)
- Fuel capacity: 2,400 imp gal (11,000 L; 2,900 US gal)
- Lubricant cap.: 135 US gal (511 L; 112 imp gal)
- Coolant cap.: 210 US gal (795 L; 175 imp gal)
- Sandbox cap.: 56 cu ft (1.59 m^{3}) (basic); 72 cu ft (2.04 m^{3}) (special)
- Prime mover: EMD 12-645E (-1/AC); EMD 8-645E3C (T)
- RPM
  - RPM low idle: 235
  - RPM idle: 300
  - Maximum RPM: 904
- Engine type: V12 2-stroke diesel (-1/AC); V8 2-stroke diesel (T)
- Aspiration: Roots blower (-1/AC); Turbocharger (T)
- Displacement: 7,740 cu in (126.8 L) (-1/AC)
- Alternator: AR10 (AC)
- Generator: AR10-D14 (-1/T)
- Traction motors: 4×D77 (-1/T)
  - Continuous: 920 Amperes (with 62:15 gearing) (-1/T)
- Cylinders: 12 (-1/AC); 8 (T)
- Cylinder size: 9.1 in × 10 in (231 mm × 254 mm) (-1/AC)
- Transmission: diesel electric
- Loco brake: Straight air
- Train brakes: Westinghouse 26L air brake
Performance figures
- Maximum speed: 53 mph (85 km/h) (with 65:12 gearing); 70 mph (110 km/h) (with 62:15 gearing); 76 mph (122 km/h) (with 61:16 gearing); 82 mph (132 km/h) (with 60:17 gearing)
- Power output: 1,500 hp (1.12 MW)
- Tractive effort: 47,000 lbf (210 kN)
Career
- Locale: United States

The EMD GP15 is a 4-axle diesel-electric locomotive built by General Motors Electro-Motive Division between June 1976 and April 1983. Intended to provide an alternative to the rebuilding programs that many railroads were applying to their early road switchers, it is generally employed as a yard switcher or light road switcher. There were 3 variants made: the GP15-1, the GP15T, and the GP15AC. The GP15-1 and GP15AC are powered by a 12-cylinder EMD 645E engine, which generates 1,500 hp (1,119 kW). The GP15T differs in that it uses a turbo charged 8-cylinder instead of the roots blown 12-cylinder to generate the same horsepower. The GP15AC differs from the others as it uses an AC alternator connected to the engine instead of a DC generator to drive the traction motors. The radiator section is similar to those found on the EMD SD40T-2 and EMD SD45T-2 "tunnel motors," leading some observers to incorrectly identify the units as such or as GP15Ts, and giving them the nickname "baby tunnel motors". A number of GP15-1s remain in service today for yard work and light road duty.

== History and variants ==
=== GP15-1 ===
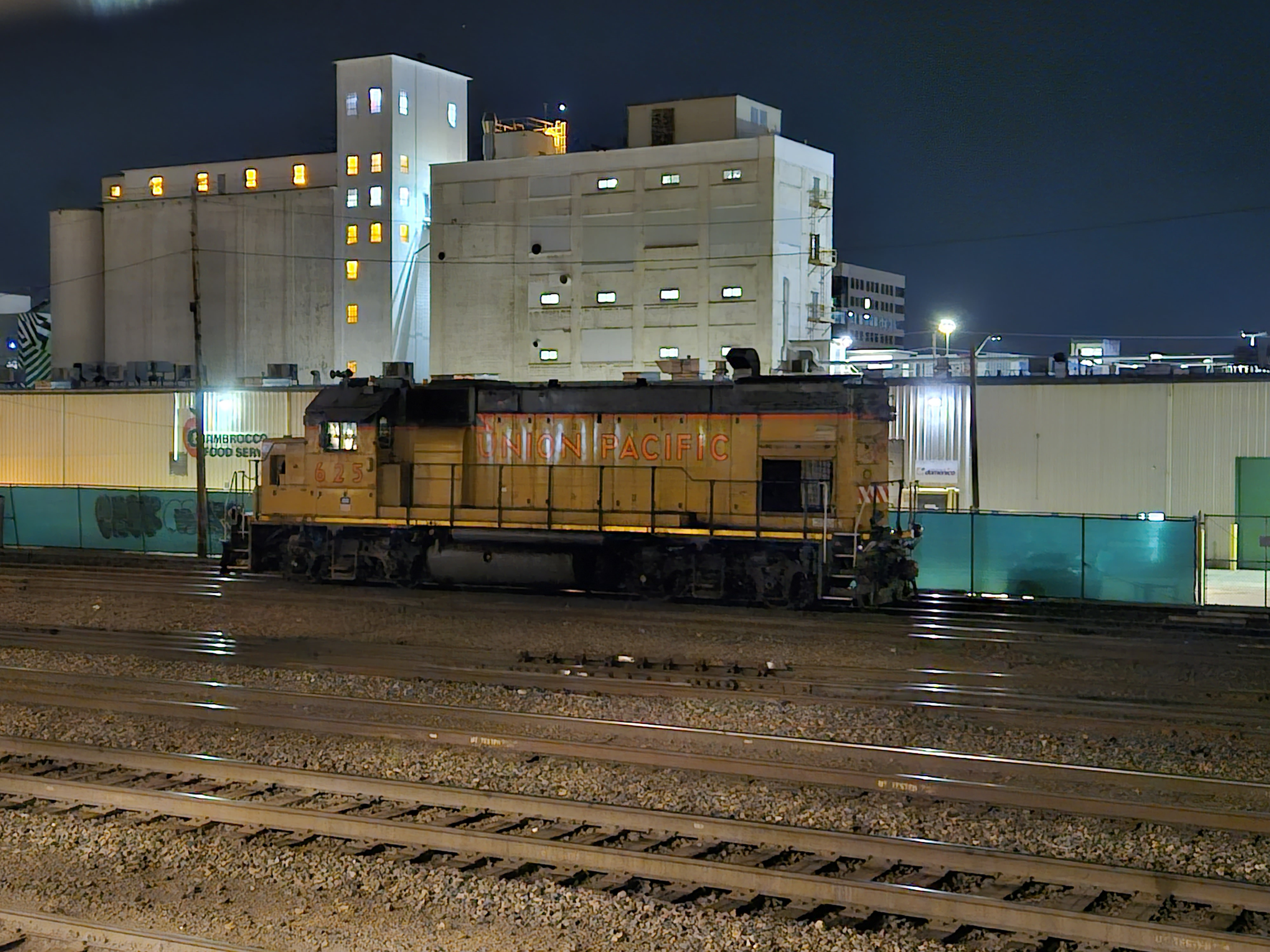
A Union Pacific GP15-1 idling in Denver. This is a former Missouri Pacific GP15-1

The GP15-1 was the most popular variant as it did not contain either of the newer technologies of the other two variants (turbocharging or AC control). EMD built a total of 310 units for American railroads in this variant between June 1976 and March 1982.

The Missouri Pacific Railroad purchased more units than the other three buyers combined. For spotting purposes, the MP models have a number of visually distinguishing features, though not all were applied consistently to the MP units:

- The MP units have a grab iron ladder mounted on both sides of the long hood end;
- MP's initial order of GP15-1s rode on Blomberg M trucks rather than the more common Blomberg B (all subsequent units were delivered with Blomberg B trucks) — and, while the standard Blomberg B truck carries two brake shoes per wheel, many MP units were equipped with only a single brake shoe per wheel;
- #1555–#1574 were outfitted with the standard 81" nose, while the remaining units (all built in December 1976 or later) came with an 88" nose;

Railroad	Quantity	Notes
Chicago and North Western Railway	25	Most in service with Union Pacific Railroad
Conrail	100	#1600–1699 all retired by CSX Transportation and sold to GMTX. All retired by Norfolk Southern Railway and sold to LTEX.
Missouri Pacific Railroad	160	Most in service with Union Pacific Railroad
St. Louis-San Francisco Railway	25	#100–124 All have been retired by BNSF Railway. Some traded to GMTX for GP38-2's
Totals	310	

=== GP15T ===
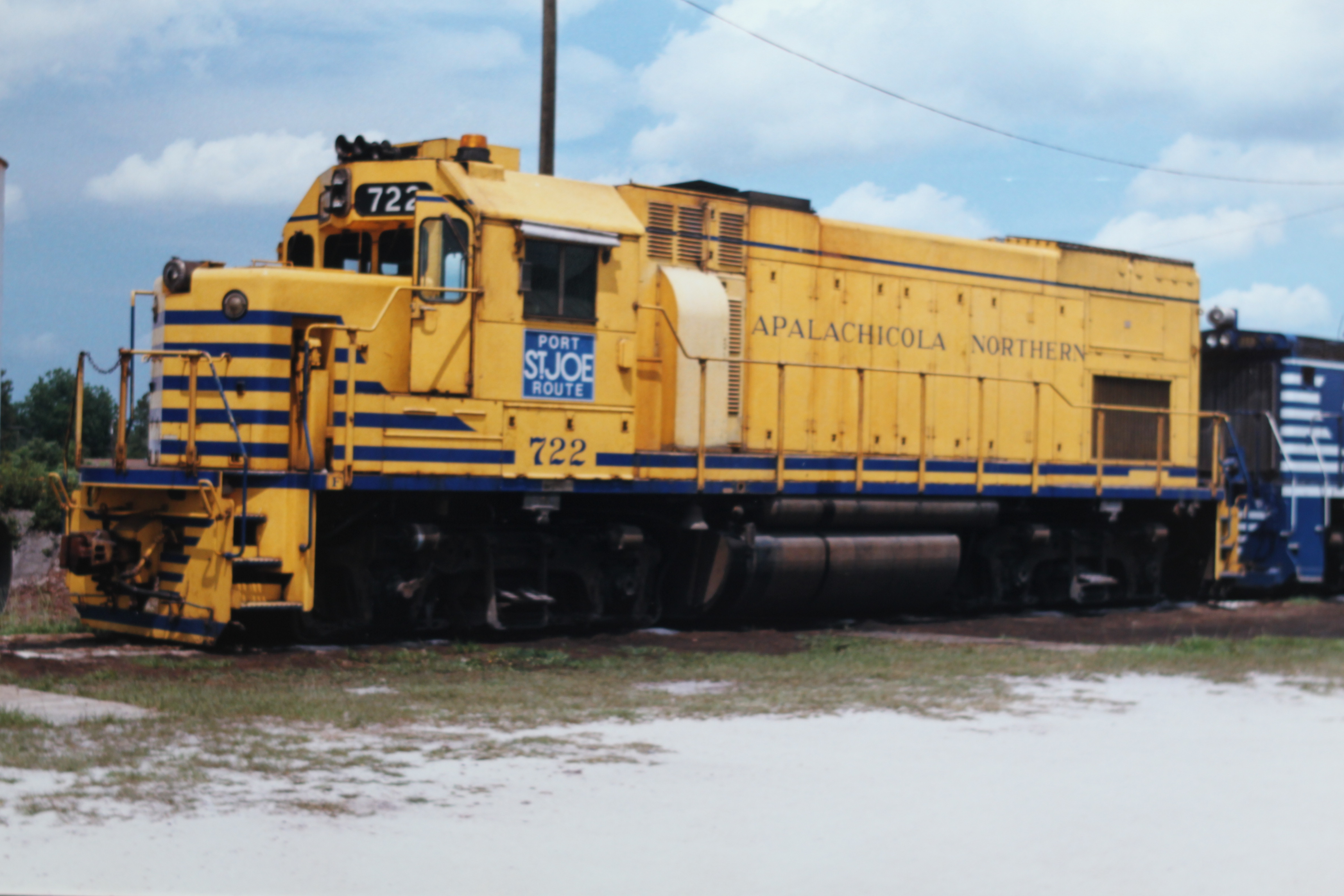
Apalachicola Northern GP15T #722

EMD built 28 examples of a variant, the GP15T, between October 1982 and April 1983. It was a very close cousin to the GP15-1, but used a turbocharger in order to generate more power from a smaller engine. Power was provided by an 8-cylinder diesel engine that generated 1,500 hp (1.12 MW), the same as the GP15-1, but with four fewer cylinders.

28 examples of this locomotive model were built for American railroads. The Chessie System received the majority of them as C&O 1500–1524 (25 units), while the rest went to the Apalachicola Northern Railroad in Florida as AN 720–722 (3 units). Chessie System's units were the only GP15s to be built with dynamic brakes.

Railroad	Quantity	Notes
Chessie System	25	1500-1524
Apalachicola Northern Railroad	3	720-722
Totals	28	

=== GP15AC ===
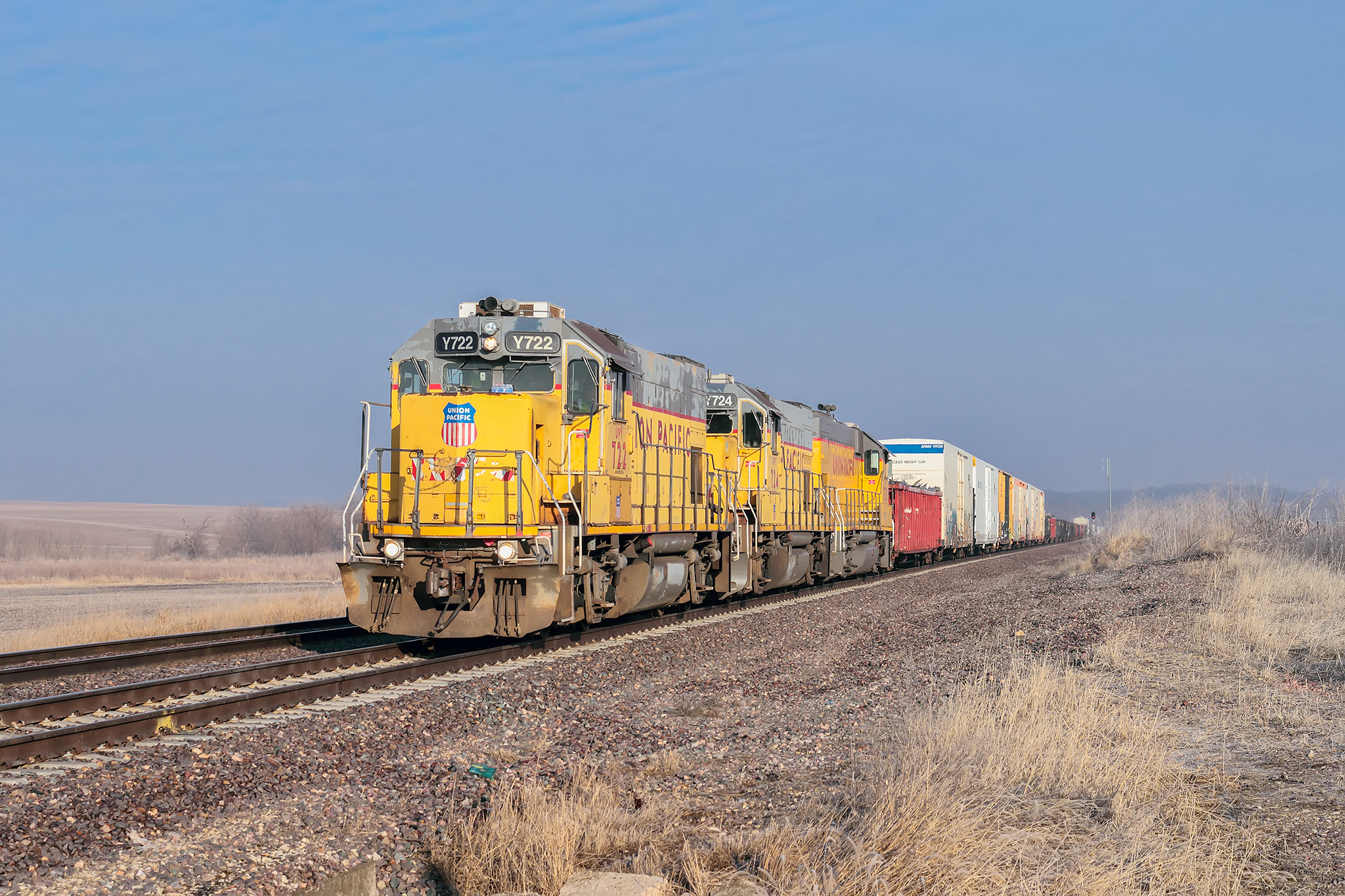
Union Pacific GP15AC #722

The GP15AC is a variant built between November and December 1982. This model differs from the GP15-1 due to Missouri Pacific specifying new AR10 AC alternators instead of rebuilt D32 DC generators. The only external difference between the GP15AC and the GP15-1 is a straight side sill (shared with the EMD GP15T) not related to the transmission difference.

34 examples of this locomotive model were built in total: 30 for Missouri Pacific Railroad, and four for Venezuela's IFE.

Railroad	Quantity	Notes
Missouri Pacific Railroad	30	
State Railways Institution	4	
Totals	34	

== Rebuilds ==
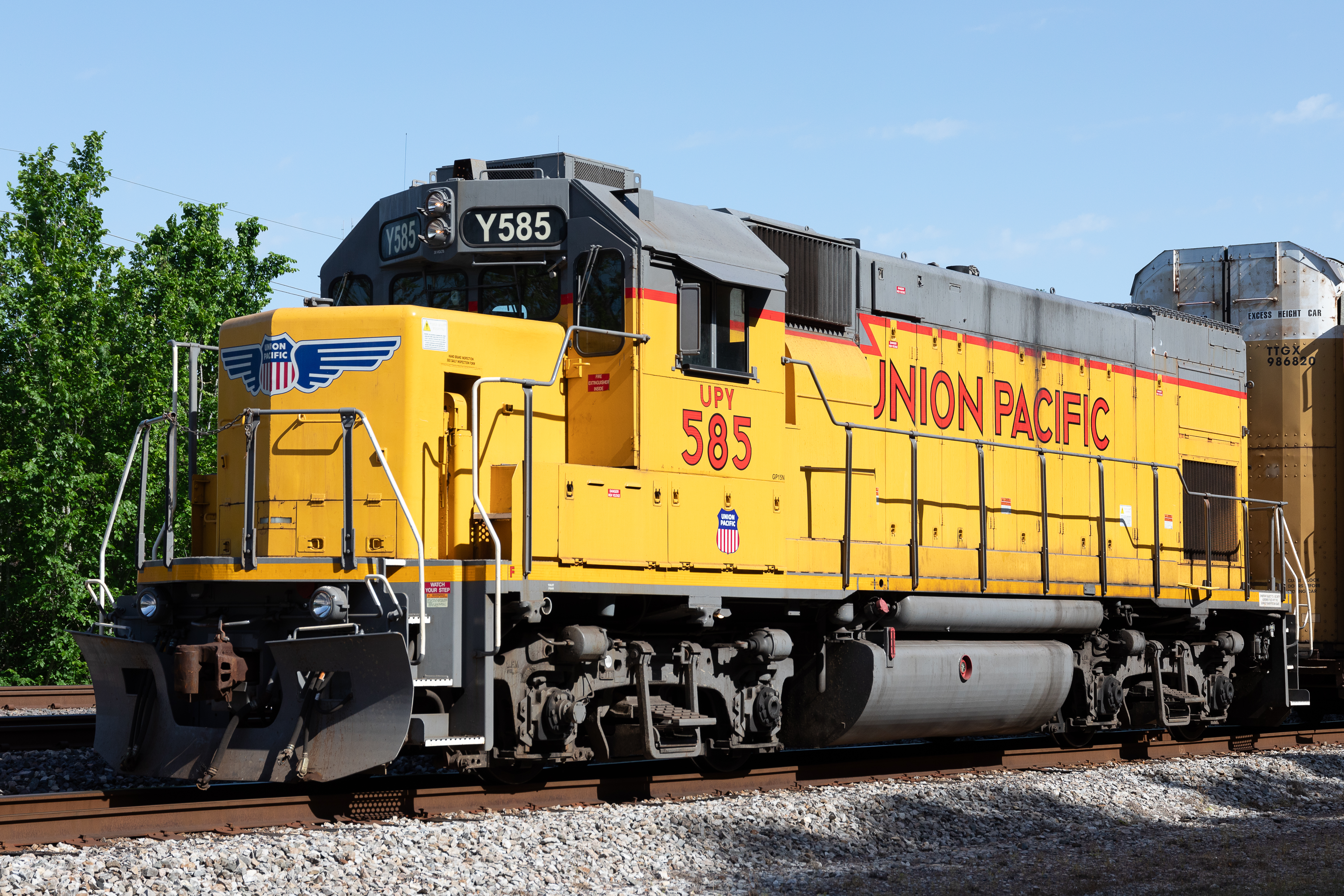
UPY 585, a rebuilt EMD GP15N, is seen in Spring, Texas.

Union Pacific has rebuilt 22 of their GP15-1's into GP15N's at their Jenks shop. These units received a microprocessor control system to increase adhesion, control options, and extend the life of the locomotive.

== Preservation ==
In 2021, CSX donated GP15T #1507 (built 1982 as C&O #1507) to the B&O Railroad Museum in Baltimore, Maryland. It is the first GP15 class locomotive to be preserved.
