= EMD 645 =

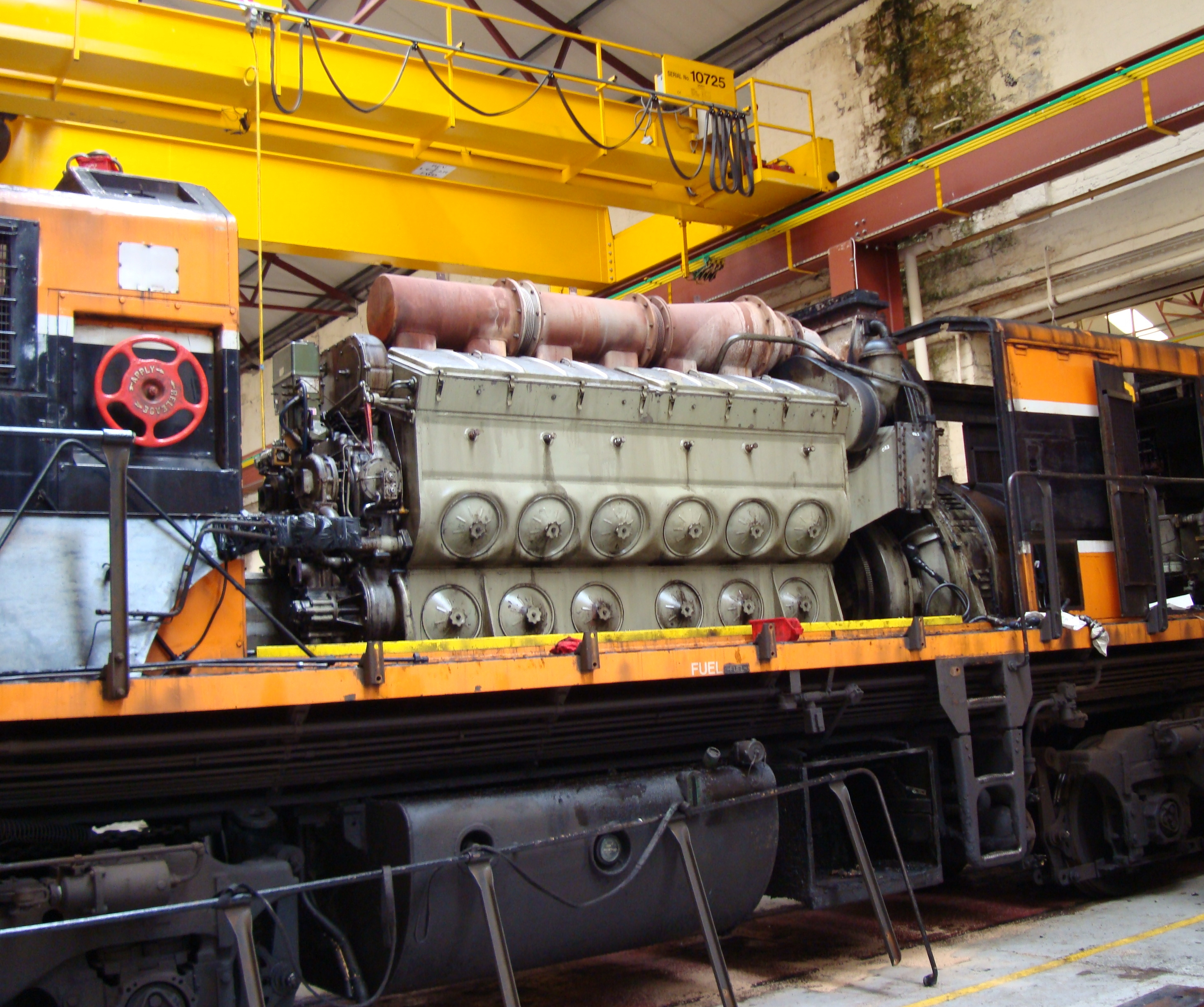
- An EMD 12-645E3 turbocharged engine, installed in an Iarnród Eireann 071 class locomotive

Overview
- Manufacturer: Electro-Motive Division of General Motors
- Also called: E-Engine and F-Engine
- Production: 1965–1983; limited runs through the 1990s. Last newly made in 2008 for G26MC-2U for Indonesia

Layout
- Configuration: 45° Vee in V6, V8, V12, V16, or V20
- Displacement: 3,870 to 12,900 cu in (63.4 to 211.4 L); 645 cu in (10.6 L) per cylinder
- Cylinder bore: 9 1/16 in (230 mm)
- Piston stroke: 10 in (254 mm)
- Cylinder block material: Flat, formed and rolled structural steel members, and steel forgings, integrated into a weldment
- Cylinder head material: Cast iron, one per cylinder
- Valvetrain: Intake ports in each cylinder liner, 4 exhaust valves in each cylinder head
- Compression ratio: 14.5:1(turbo versions) 16:1(roots blown versions)

RPM range
- Idle speed: 315 (low idle 200)
- Max. engine speed: 900 (950 for 645D/645F)

Combustion
- Supercharger: One or two Roots-type blower
- Turbocharger: Single, clutch driven
- Fuel system: Unit injector
- Management: Mechanical (Woodward governor)
- Fuel type: Diesel
- Oil system: Forced lubrication system, Wet sump
- Cooling system: Liquid cooled

Output
- Power output: 750 to 4,200 hp (560 to 3,130 kW)

Chronology
- Predecessor: EMD 567
- Successor: EMD 710

The EMD 645 is a family of two-stroke diesel engines that was designed and manufactured by the Electro-Motive Division of General Motors. While the 645 series was intended primarily for locomotive, marine and stationary engine use, one 16-cylinder version powered the 33-19 "Titan" prototype haul truck designed by GM's Terex division.

The 645 series was an evolution of the earlier 567 series and a precursor to the later 710 series. First introduced in 1965, the EMD 645 series remained in production on a by-request basis long after it was replaced by the 710, and most 645 service parts are still in production. The EMD 645 engine series is currently supported by Electro-Motive Diesel, Inc., which purchased the assets of the Electro-Motive Division from General Motors in 2005. EMD is currently owned by Progress Rail (since 2010).

In 1951, E. W. Kettering wrote a paper for the ASME entitled History and Development of the 567 Series General Motors Locomotive Engine, which goes into great detail about the technical obstacles that were encountered during the development of the 567 engine. These same considerations apply to the 645 and 710, as they are a logical extension of the 567C – by applying a cylinder bore increase for the 645, and a cylinder bore increase and a stroke increase for the 710 – to achieve a greater power output without changing the external size of the engines or their weight, thereby achieving significant improvements in power per unit volume and power per unit weight.

Due to emissions restrictions these engines have been gradually phased out for the four-stroke alternatives.

== History ==
The 645 series engines entered production in 1965. As the 567 series had reached its limits in output power increases, a larger displacement was needed; this was accomplished by increasing the bore from 8 1/2 in (216 mm) on the 567 series to 9 1/16 in (230 mm) on the 645 series, while maintaining the same stroke and deck height. While the crankcase was modified from the 567 series, 567C and later engines (or 567 engines which have been modified to 567C specifications, sometimes referred to as 567AC or 567BC engines) can accept 645 series service parts, such as power assemblies. Conversely, the 567E engine employs a 645E series block with 567 series power assemblies.

All 645 engines utilize either a Roots blower or a turbocharger for cylinder scavenging. For turbocharged engines, the turbocharger is gear-driven and has an overrunning clutch that allows it to act as a centrifugal blower at low engine speeds (when exhaust gas flow and temperature alone are insufficient to drive the turbine) and a purely exhaust-driven turbocharger at higher speeds. The turbocharger can revert to acting as a supercharger during demands for large increases in engine output power. While more expensive to maintain than Roots blowers, EMD claims that this design allows "significantly" reduced fuel consumption and emissions, improved high-altitude performance, and even up to a 50 percent increase in maximum rated output power over Roots-blown engines for the same engine displacement.

Output power for naturally aspirated engines (including Roots-blown two-stroke engines) is usually derated 2.5 percent per 1,000 feet (300 m) above mean sea level, a tremendous penalty at the 10,000 feet (3,000 m) or greater elevations which several Western U.S. and Canada railroads operate, and this can amount to a 25 percent power loss. Turbocharging effectively eliminates this derating.

The 645 series has a maximum engine speed of between 900 and 950 revolutions per minute (rpm), an increase over the 800 to 900 rpm maximum speed for the 567 series. An engine speed of 900 rpm was essential for 60 Hz stationary power generator applications and certain passenger locomotives equipped with 60 Hz, 480-volt three-phase "head-end power" systems. When used solely for traction purposes, the engine speed varies depending on the throttle position. The 950 rpm maximum speed of the 645F engine proved to be too high, thereby compromising its reliability, and the replacement engine, the 710G, reverted to 900 rpm maximum speed.

EMD built an SD40 demonstrator (number 434) in July 1964 to field test the 16-645E3 engine, followed by another eight SD40 demonstrators (numbers 434A through 434H) and a GP40 demonstrator (number 433A) in 1965. In December 1965 and January 1966, EMD built three SD45 demonstrators (numbers 4351 through 4353) to field test the 20-645E3 engine.

When the 645 engine entered production in 1965, a large series of new locomotive models was introduced. The turbocharged version was used in EMD's 40 Series (GP40, SD40 and SD45) in 3,000 horsepower (2,200 kW), sixteen-cylinder form (40) and in 3,600 horsepower (2,700 kW), twenty-cylinder form (45). EMD also introduced the Roots-blown 38 Series (GP38, SD38) and turbocharged, twelve-cylinder 39 Series (GP39, SD39). All of these locomotive models extensively share common components and subsystems, thereby significantly reducing cost and increasing interchangeability. The GP38-2 and SD40-2 became the most popular models of the series and among the most popular locomotive models ever built.

Starting with the introduction of the 645 series engines, EMD's model naming convention generally increased model designs by ten (such as with the 40, 50, 60 and 70 series). The number was reduced by one for twelve-cylinder versions (such as the 39, 49 and 59 series); reduced by two for Roots-blown versions (for the 28 and 38 series); and increased by five for higher-power versions (such as the 45 and 75 series).

== Specifications (many are common to 567 and 710 engines) ==
All 645 engines are two-stroke 45-degree V-engines. Each cylinder is of 645 cubic inches (10.57 L) displacement, hence the name; with a bore of 9 1/16 inches (230 mm), a stroke of 10 inches (254 mm) and a compression ratio of 14.5:1 for turbo engines, or 16:1 for roots blown engines. The engine is a uniflow design with four poppet-type exhaust valves in the cylinder head and charge air scavenging ports within the sides of the cylinders. All engines use a single overhead camshaft per bank, with exhaust valves operated by two cam lobes (each of which operates two exhaust valves through a "bridge") and one cam lobe to operate the unit injector which is in the center of the four exhaust valves. Rocker arms are roller-equipped to reduce friction while hydraulic valve actuators are used to reduce valve lash. Post-1995 710 engines employ electronic unit injectors, however these injectors still utilize a camshaft-actuated piston pump, as on non-EFI injectors.

Cylinders in each V-pair are directly opposite each other, and the connecting rods are of a fork-and-blade arrangement, with "fork" rods on one bank of cylinders and "blade" rods on the other (with the same stroke on both banks). (In contrast, General Electric's 7FDL and 7FDM engines use "articulated" master-and-slave connecting rods, essentially two adjacent cylinders on a radial engine, and have a slightly longer stroke on the bank using slave rods.) (Note: Service power assemblies are available from EMD, and from competitors, as "Fork", "Blade", and "Partial" (neither "Fork" nor "Blade"), P/N 40173918.) The engines are provided with either a single or twin Roots blower, or a single mechanically-assisted turbocharger, depending on required power output.

For maintenance, a power assembly, consisting of a cylinder head, cylinder liner, piston, piston carrier and piston rod can be individually replaced relatively easily and quickly. The engine block is made from flat, formed and rolled structural steel members and steel forgings welded into a single structure (a "weldment"), so it can easily be repaired using conventional shop tools.

16-645 engine arrangement and firing order. 8-, 12-, and 20-645 have similar arrangements, with the right bank being numbered sequentially before the left bank, so a 20-645 would have cylinders #1–10 in the right bank and #11–20 in the left bank. The front of the engine is at the rear of the locomotive; the rear of the engine is at the front of the locomotive.

- Orientation: The "front" of the engine (the engine governor and fluid pump end) is actually at the rear end of the locomotive, immediately adjacent to the locomotive's coolant supply and cooling system; the "rear" of the engine (the induction system and traction generator or alternator end) is at the front end of the locomotive, immediately adjacent to the locomotive's electrical cabinet.
- Rotation: Engine rotation is in the conventional clockwise direction, as viewed from the "front" of the engine, but is in a counterclockwise direction, as viewed from the front of the locomotive. Marine and stationary installations are available with either a left or a right-hand rotating engine.
- Firing order
  - Eight cylinder: 1, 5, 3, 7, 4, 8, 2, 6 (Note: Even firing: an ignition event every 45 degrees of crankshaft rotation; directly opposite pairs of cylinders always fire 45° apart.)
  - Twelve cylinder: 1, 7, 4, 10, 2, 8, 6, 12, 3, 9, 5, 11 (Note: Odd firing: ideally, an ignition event would occur every 30° of crankshaft rotation; however, each pair of cylinders always fires 45° apart. As a result, the firing intervals alternate between 45° and 15°.)
  - Sixteen cylinder: 1, 8, 9, 16, 3, 6, 11, 14, 4, 5, 12, 13, 2, 7, 10, 15 (Note: Even firing: an ignition event every 22.5° of crankshaft rotation. Since each pair of cylinders always fires 45° apart, the engine fires in a right-right-left-left fashion.)
  - Twenty cylinder: 1, 19, 8, 11, 5, 18, 7, 15, 2, 17, 10, 12, 3, 20, 6, 13, 4, 16, 9, 14 (Note: Odd firing: To achieve even firing, the firing intervals must be 18°. However, each pair of cylinders always fire 45° apart. As a result, the firing intervals alternate between 9° and 27°.)
- Exhaust valves: Four per cylinder
- Main bearings
  - Eight cylinder: 5 (one-piece crankshaft)
  - Twelve cylinder: 7 (one-piece crankshaft)
  - Sixteen cylinder: 10 (two-piece crankshaft, pinned and bolted in the middle)
  - Twenty cylinder: 12 (two-piece crankshaft, pinned and bolted in the middle)
- Fuel injection: Unit injector; electronic unit injector in post-1995 engines
- Engine starting
  - AC traction generator: Dual electric starting motors, parallel-connected 64 volt starters in early applications, series-connected 32 volt starters in late applications
  - DC traction generator: Generator series field
  - AC power generator: Dual pneumatic starters in most stationary engine applications
- Engine Control
  - Woodward PGE locomotive governor, or equivalent, in mechanical engines; EMD engine control unit in electronic engines
- Weight (E3B turbocharged models)
  - Eight cylinder: 22,050 pounds (10.0 tonnes)
  - Twelve cylinder: 28,306 pounds (12.8 tonnes)
  - Sixteen cylinder: 36,425 pounds (16.5 tonnes)
  - Twenty cylinder: 43,091 pounds (19.5 tonnes)

== Versions ==
ID	Cylinders	Induction	Rated RPM	Power (hp)	Power (MW)	Introduced	Applications
8-645C (Note: 8-645C engines were 8-567C engines which were updated with 645 "power assemblies"; normally a 645 engine employs an E or F block and their designation is 645E or 645F; the 567 engine has a significantly different oil sump and frame mounting than the later 645 or 710 engine, hence a "645C" engine is a hybrid, possibly rated as a 645 engine, but physically more like an earlier 567 engine)	8	Blower (1)	900	1100	0.8	1965	G18AR, New Zealand DBR class
6-645E	6	Blower (1)	900	750	0.6	1967	Victorian Railways Y class (G6B)
8-645E	8	Blower (1)	900	1000	0.75	1966	SW1000, SW1001, V/Line P class, Victorian Railways T class (3rd series) / H class, CIÉ 201 Class (rebuilt), Renfe Class 310, Queensland Railways 1720 class
12-645E	12	Blower (2)	900	1500	1.1	1966	MP15DC, MP15AC, G22, SW1500, SW1504, GP15-1, GP15AC, CIÉ 001 Class (rebuilt), Commonwealth Railways NJ class, MV Liberty Star, SJ Class T44, Queensland Railways 1502 class, 1550 class, 2400 class, 2450 class, 2470 class
16-645E	16	Blower (2)	900	2000	1.5	1966	GP38, GP38-2, SD38, SDP38, SD38-2, NSWGR 422 Class, Victorian Railways X class (2nd & 3rd series), G26, Renfe Class 319, Queensland Railways 2100 class, 2130 class, 2141 class, 2150 class, 2170 class
8-645E3	8	Turbocharger	900	1650	1.2		MP15T, FGC 254 Series
12-645C	12	Blower (2)	900	1650	1.2		G22AR, New Zealand DC class
12-645E3	12	Turbocharger	900	2300	1.7	1968	GP39, GP39-2, SD39, SDL39, CIÉ 071, GT22, British Rail Class 57/0 & 57601
16-645E3	16	Turbocharger	900	3000	2.2	1965	GP40, GP40-2, GP40P, GP40P-2, GP40TC, SD40, SD40A, SD40-2, SD40T-2, SDP40, SDP40F, F40PH, Commonwealth Railways CL class (Original), Australian National AL class (Original), WAGR L class, VR C Class, GT26CW, DSB Class MZ (series I–II)
20-645E3	20	Turbocharger	900	3600	2.7	1965	SD45, SD45-2, SDP45, F45, FP45, DDM45, DSB Class MZ (series III–IV)
16-645E3A	16	Turbocharger	950	3300	2.5	1969	F40C, DDA40X (dual engine), Renfe Class 333
20-645E3A	20	Turbocharger	950	4200	3.1	1970	SD45X
8-645E3B	8	Turbocharger	904	1514-1666	1.1-1.2		Proposed
12-645E3B	12	Turbocharger	904	2380-2570	1.8-1.9		JT22CW, V/Line A class, V/Line N class (2nd series), WRA Class
16-645E3B	16	Turbocharger	904	3195-3390	2.4-2.5		New South Wales 81 class locomotive, Australian National BL class, V/Line G class (original), NSB Di 4, DSB Class ME, M62M Rail Polska, Rolling Stock Solutions F40PH-4C
20-645E3B	20	Turbocharger	904	3765-3960	2.8-3.0		SD45T-2
8-645E3C	8	Turbocharger	904	1500	1.1		GP15T
12-645E3C	12	Turbocharger	900	2510	1.8		V/Line N class (1st series), New Zealand DFT class, Queensland Railways 2250 class, 2300 class
16-645E3C	16	Turbocharger	950	3300	2.5		British Rail Class 59, V/Line G class (original), Pacific National XRB class, Freight Australia XR class, VL class (Australia), Commonwealth Railways CL class (rebuilt versions), Australian National ALF class, TCDD DE33000, F40PH-2, SD40E, Henschel DE3300
16-645E4	16	Turbocharger	900	3300	2.46	1973	Terex 33-19 "Titan" haul truck
16-645F	16	Turbocharger	950	3500	2.6	1977	GP40X, GP50, SD40X, SD50
12-645F3B	12	Turbocharger	950	2800	2.1		GP49, British Rail Class 57/3 & 57602-57605
16-645F3B	16	Turbocharger	950	3600	2.7		EMD FT36HCW-2-Korail 7000 Series; MPI MPXpress MP36PH-3S and -3C, RL class, V/Line G class (rebuilt)

== Stationary/marine versions ==
Like most EMD engines, the 645 is also sold for stationary and marine applications.

Stationary and marine installations are available with either a left- or right-hand rotating engine.

Marine engines differ from railroad and stationary engines mainly in the shape and depth of the engine's oil sump, which has been altered to accommodate the rolling and pitching motions encountered in marine applications.

Engine speed

- Full: 900 RPM for 60 Hz power generation; 750 RPM for 50 Hz power generation; variable up to 900 RPM for marine applications
- Idle: 350 RPM
- Compression ratio: 16:1

Brake horsepower (ABS rating)

- Model 645E6 engines, 900 RPM
  - 8-cylinder: 1050
  - 12-cylinder: 1500
  - 16-cylinder: 1950
- Model 645E7C/F7B engines at 800 and 900 RPM
  - 8-cylinder: – , 1525
  - 12-cylinder: 2305, 2550
  - 16-cylinder: 3070, 3400
  - 20-cylinder: 3600, 4000

== See also ==
- EMD 567
- EMD 710
- EMD 1010
