= Altoona Works BP4 =

American battery-electric locomotive built in 2007

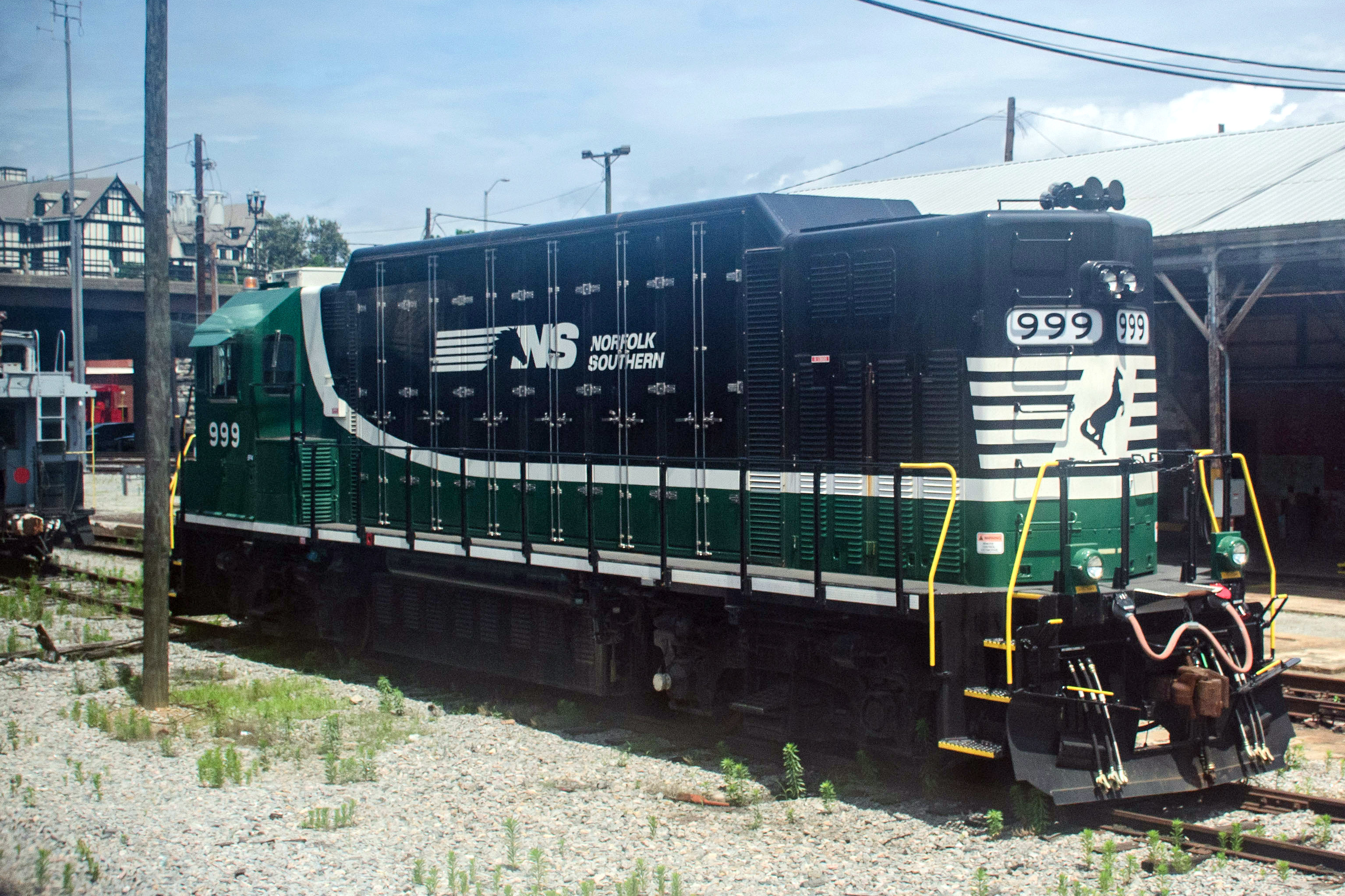
- Norfolk Southern #999, the lone BP4 yet built, in May 2017
Type and origin
- Power type: Battery-electric
- Builder: Altoona Works
Specifications
- Configuration
  - AAR: B-B
  - UIC: Bo'Bo'
- Gauge: 4 ft 8 1/2 in (1,435 mm)
Performance figures
- Power output: 1,500 hp (1,120 kW)

The Altoona Works BP4 is a 1,500 hp (1,120 kW) B-B battery-electric locomotive rebuilt by the Altoona Works of the Norfolk Southern Railway. It was created in 2007 by replacing the diesel prime mover of an EMD GP38 (Norfolk Southern #2911, formerly Conrail #7732) with 1,080 12-volt lead-acid batteries and associated control equipment. The converted locomotive was redesignated Norfolk Southern #999.

== Design ==
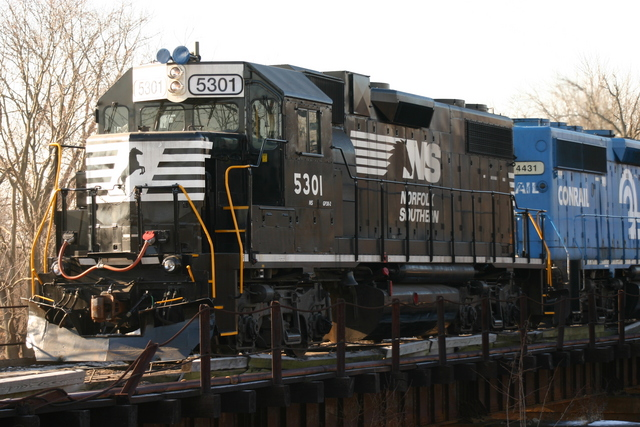
NS #999 was rebuilt from a conventional GP38 diesel locomotive (example pictured)

Despite appearing somewhat similar to a conventional diesel electric locomotive, the BP4 has no diesel engine; battery charging is provided by plugging in an external power source. Battery life is extended by the use of regenerative braking, which returns about 35% of braking power to the batteries. The BP4 is designed to operate 3 shifts on a single battery charge. This conversion significantly alters the external appearance of the locomotive, with the cab (which is actually brand new) being moved forward on the frame to make room for a large louvered battery box, which takes the place of the locomotive's long hood. The fuel tank is similarly replaced with another battery box.

== History ==
BP4 development was undertaken by Norfolk Southern, along with Brookville Equipment, Penn State University, the United States Department of Energy, and the Federal Railroad Administration. $1.3 million in federal funding subsidized the program. The locomotive was initially converted in 2007; after initial battery issues, a better battery management system was installed in 2009. A further rebuild was undertaken in 2014, changing the batteries from lead-acid to lead-carbon.

Despite the continued tweaking, NS 999 was unable to fulfill the railroad's requirements and the project was dropped. Norfolk Southern put the 999 up for auction, along with several other locomotives, in November 2019. 999 was purchased by Rail Propulsions Systems, where it was upgraded for eventual use in the Los Angeles Basin region.
