= EMD SD39 =

Model of diesel-electric locomotive

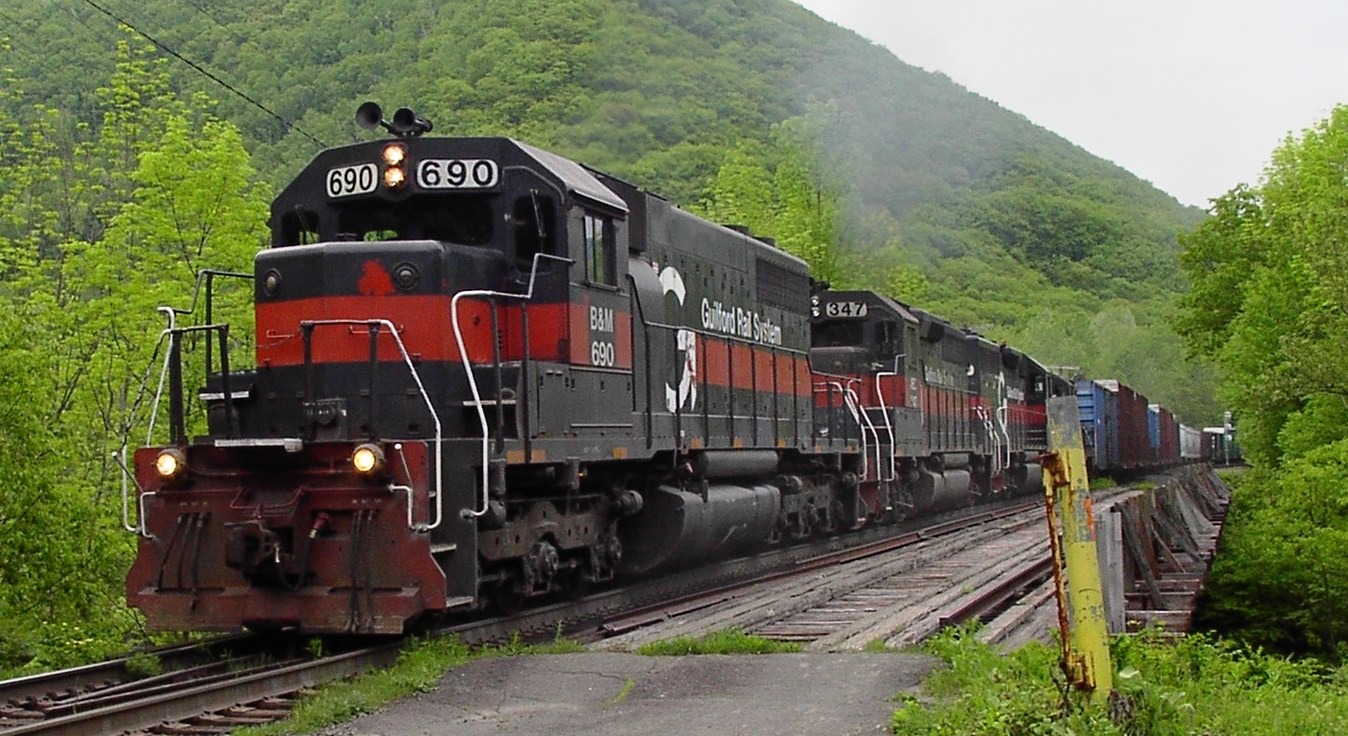
- Boston & Maine 690 (ex Illinois Terminal 2301) with Train EDRJ (East Deerfield–Rotterdam Jct) about to enter Hoosac Tunnel
Type and origin
- Power type: Diesel-electric
- Builder: General Motors Electro-Motive Division (EMD)
- Model: SD39
- Build date: August 1968 – May 1970
- Total produced: 54
Specifications
- Configuration
  - AAR: C-C
- Gauge: 4 ft 8 1/2 in (1,435 mm) standard gauge
- Driver dia.: 40 in (1,016 mm)
- Length: 65 ft 9 1/2 in (20.05 m)
- Prime mover: EMD 12-645E3
- Engine type: V12 diesel
- Aspiration: turbocharged
- Cylinders: 12
- Loco brake: Independent air; optional: dynamic brakes
- Train brakes: Air, schedule 26-L
Performance figures
- Power output: 2,300 hp (1,720 kW)
Career
- Locale: United States

The SD39 is a model of 6-axle diesel-electric locomotive built by General Motors Electro-Motive Division between August 1968 and May 1970. 54 were built for American railroads.

In 1966, EMD replaced all their old models with new ones having the new 645 diesel. These included six-axle models SD38, SD40, SDP40 and SD45; the SD39 was added in 1968. All shared standard components including the frame, cab, traction alternator, trucks, traction motors, and air brakes. The difference was the power output: SD38 = 2,000 hp (1,490 kW) from a non-turbocharged V16, SD39 = 2,300 hp (1,720 kW) from a turbocharged V12, SD40 = 3,000 hp (2,240 kW) from a turbocharged V16, and SD45 = 3,600 hp (2,680 kW) from a turbocharged V20. The SD39 had the smallest prime mover and therefore had the most unused space above the frame, inside the hood between the main generator and electrical cabinet, and outside in large end "porches".

== Variant ==
A variant was the SDL39, ordered by the Milwaukee Road. Shorter and lighter than a stock SD39, these minimized weight per axle.

== Original owners ==
Purchasers of the SD39 include:
Railroad	Quantity	Road numbers	Notes
Atchison, Topeka and Santa Fe Railway	20	4000-4019	Renumbered to 1556-1575 in 1985. All to BNSF and then sold to LTEX in 2010 for scrapping.
Illinois Terminal Railroad	6	2301-2306	4 went to Guilford Rail System, all have been scrapped.
Minneapolis, Northfield and Southern Railway	2	40-41	#40 as of August 25, 2021 used by Progressive Rail, Inc., #41 has been scrapped.
Southern Pacific Transportation Company	26	5300-5325	To Union Pacific and then to leasers and shortlines.
Total	54		

== Dash 2 Series ==
On January 1, 1972, EMD debuted Dash 2 models. No official SD39-2s were built, though the model was catalogued. Some SD39s were rebuilt to Dash 2 specifications, however, and received the SD39-2 designation. Also, BNSF has re-designated some of their SD40-2 locomotives as 'SD39-2s'; it is unknown at this time what mechanical changes have been made to these locomotives.

== Dispositions ==
Some of the SD39 model were subsequently resold to other operators including:

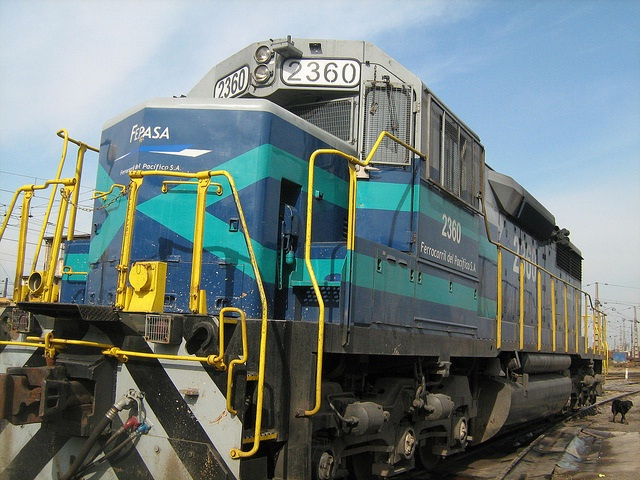
FEPASA 2360, an SD39-2M, in 2011.

- FEPASA - 14 SD39-2s numbered 2350-2363; the last seven, 2358–2363, rebuilt as SD39-2M by NRE.
- TRANSAP - 4 SD39-3M locomotives rebuilt by MPI de Mexico numbered D2301-D2304.
