= Renfe Class 319 =

Class of Spanish diesel-electric locomotive

The Renfe Class 319 is a series of mainline diesel engined locomotives utilising EMD engines built for Spanish state railway company Renfe between the 1960s and 1990s.

== Versions ==
=== 1965–1973 build ===
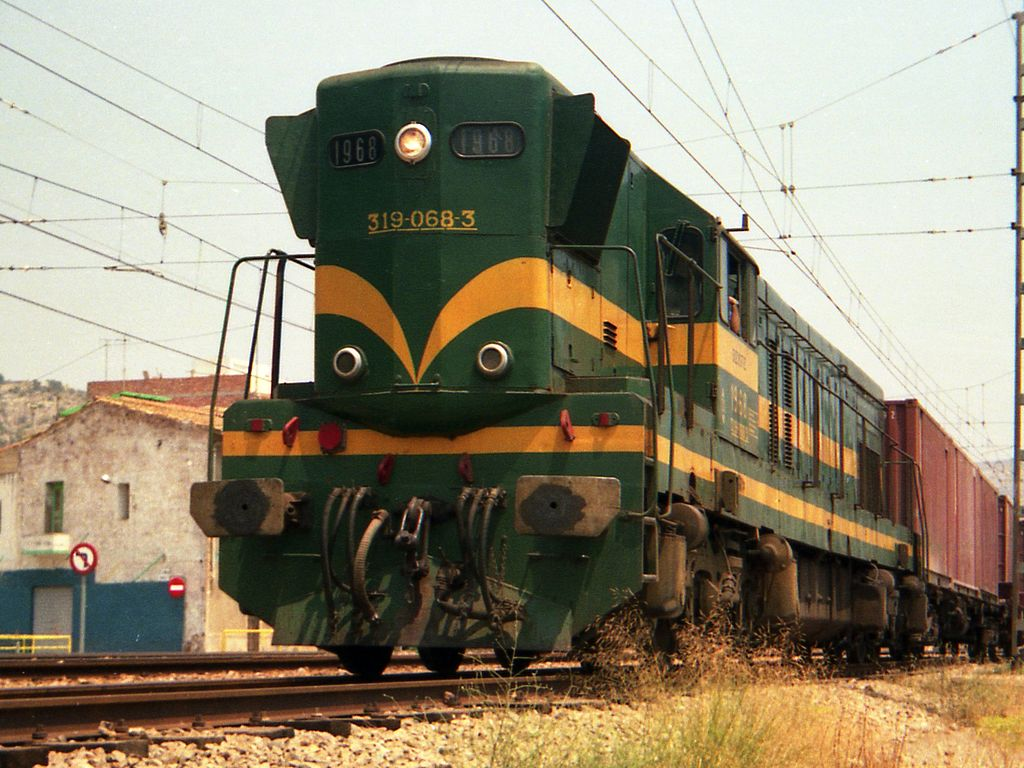
original series 319.068 with a container train at Benicàssim station in 1986

The initial locomotives (originally designated Renfe 1900) were single cab hood unit designs, built at General Motors' La Grange, Illinois factory, as an Iberian gauge variant of the EMD G16 locomotive type, using EMD 567 engines; the construction order was completed under license at the MACOSA factory in Spain, using the same components in a double cab design.

=== 1984–1992 build ===
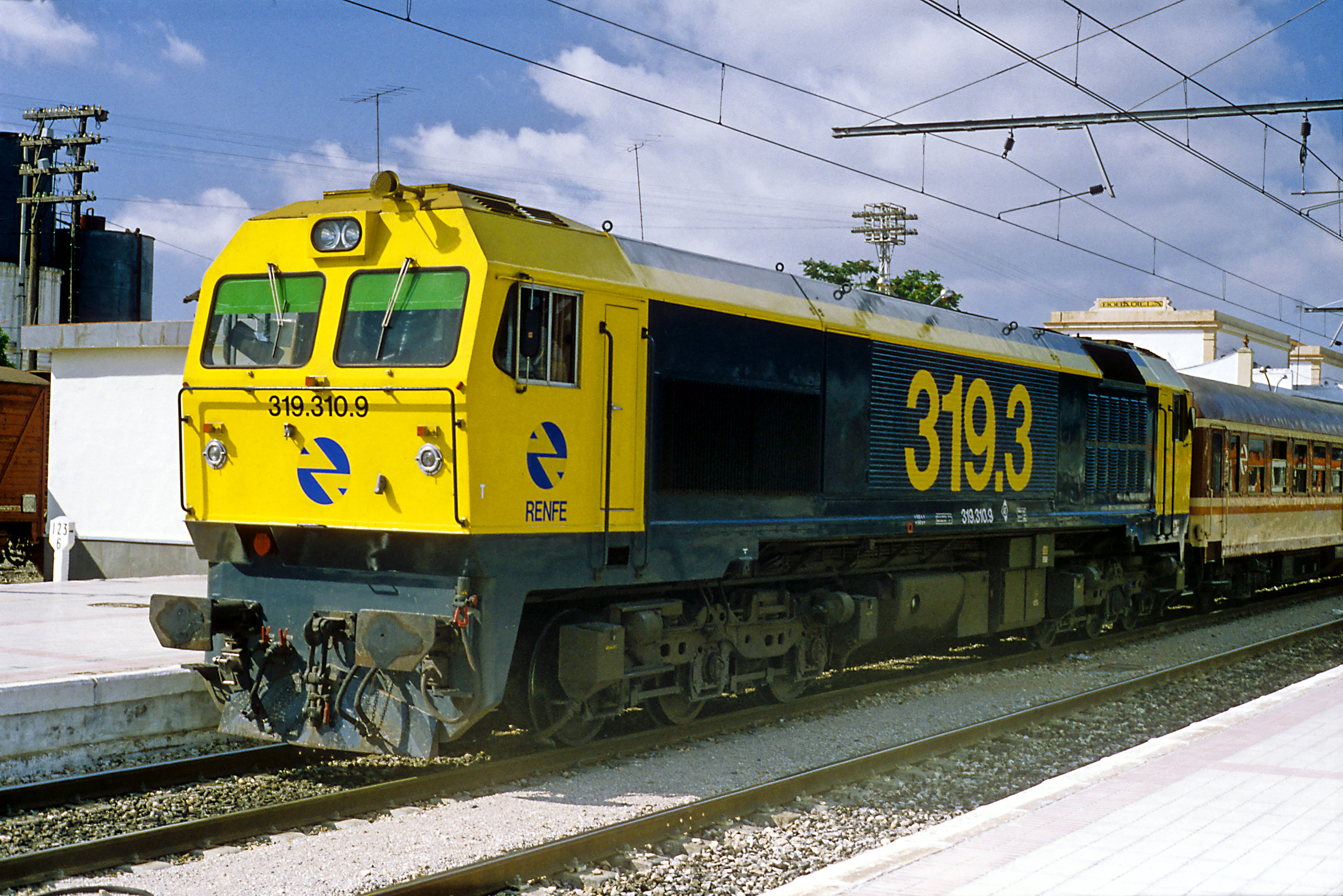
319.3 series number 319.310.9 in 1993

A second tranche of locomotives were built in the 1980s/90s for Renfe, forming 3 subclasses: the 319.2 subclass were rebuilds of the original class 319, and reused the EMD567 engine; two further subtypes, class 319.3, and 319.4 were constructed in the early 1990s, the subclasses included technical improvements including using EMD 645 engines; class 319.3 were built for passenger trains with Head End Power included; class 319.4 were built for freight work, and had microprocessor based traction control, replacing electromechanical control.
