= EMD Dash 2 =

Series of EMD diesel locomotives built from 1972

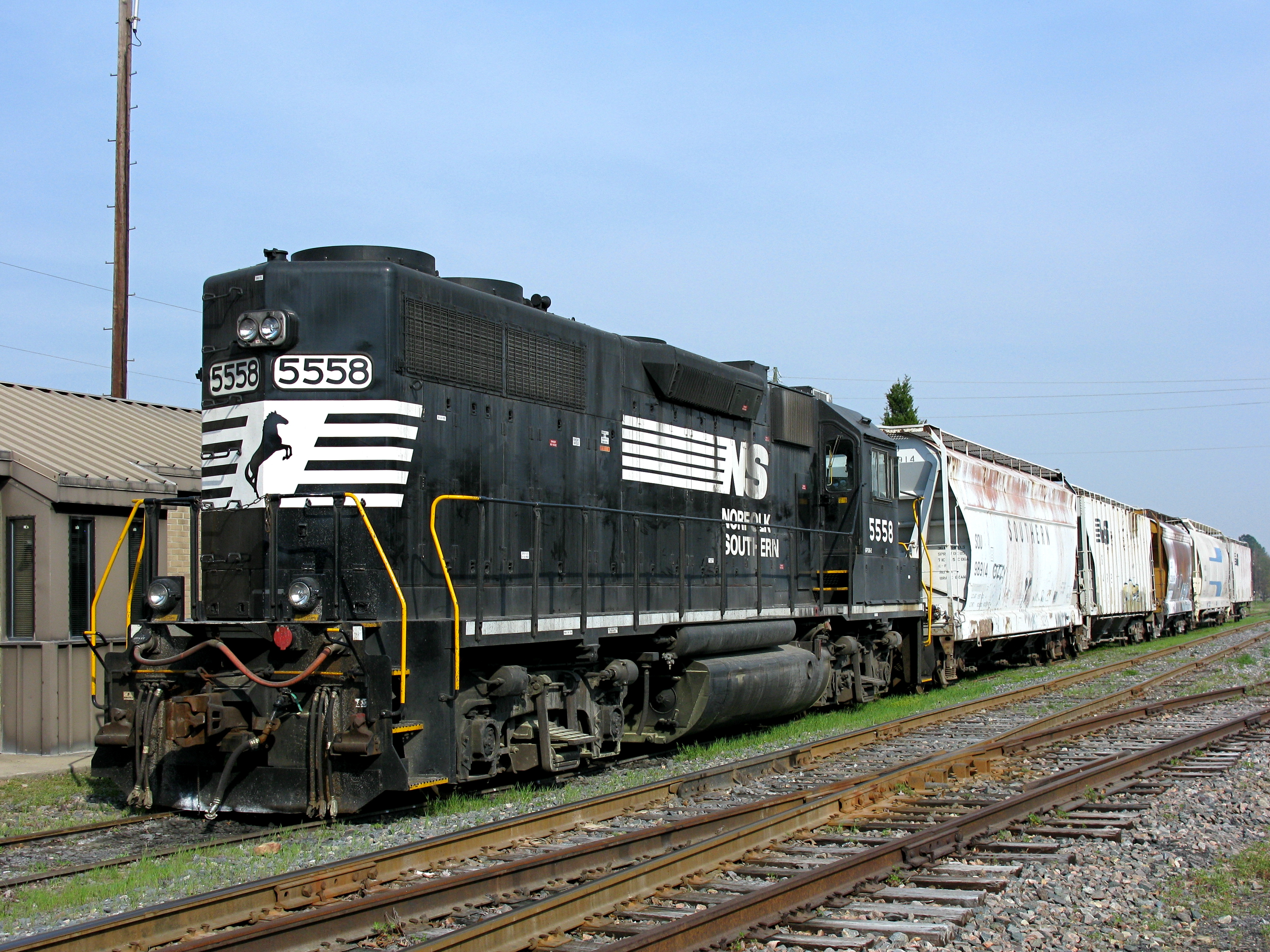
Norfolk Southern Locomotive EMD GP38-2, part of the EMD Dash 2 line

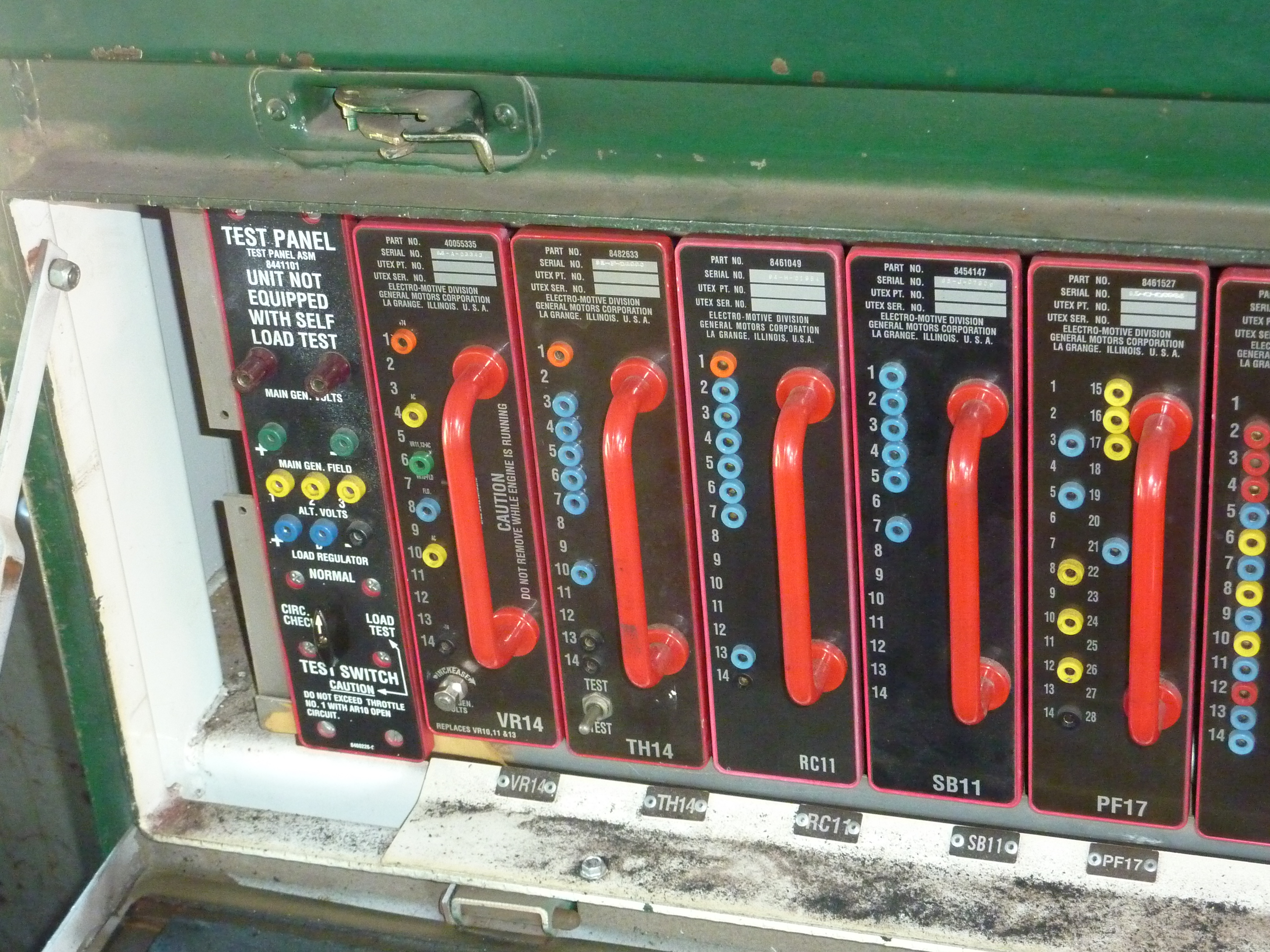
EMD Dash 2 modules

The EMD Dash 2 is a line of diesel-electric locomotives introduced by General Motors' Electro-Motive Division (EMD) on January 1, 1972. Designations of these models were those of the former models with "-2" added (e.g., the SD40 was replaced by the SD40-2). They retained the basic specifications of the earlier models in terms of power output and most other features, but introduced a number of improvements to the locomotives' internal systems, specifically the electrical systems and the trucks of the locomotives. These were intended to improve availability, efficiency, and ease of maintenance.

One major improvement was a modularized electrical control cabinet, allowing maintenance by unit replacement and the use of common parts. These concepts were first tested on the DDA40X.

== Changes ==
Minor externally visible changes common across the whole line include the following:

- Modified trucks with damping struts. Four-axle trucks have damping struts on two diagonally opposite corners. Six-axle trucks have them on the center axle.
- Six axle trucks with all traction motors pointing towards the center. This improves the truck's factor of adhesion but also increases each truck's overall length. The locomotive's frame was lengthened as a consequence. These were the HT-C trucks which were employed for the next 20 years. The older Flexicoil C trucks remained a seldom-selected option.
- Engine water level sight glass on the rear upper right-hand side of the long hood.
- Battery boxes in front of the cab have bolted down covers, rather than hinged.
- Circular access panels added at the top corners of the long hood.
- Cab roof extends slightly beyond the cab rear to accommodate the larger electrical cabinet.

== Models ==
The Dash 2 line was highly successful. The models offered included the following:

- GP38-2
- GP38-2W
- GP39-2
- GP40-2
- GP40-2L(W)
- GP40-2W
- GP40PH-2
- SD38-2
- SD40-2
- SD40-2F
- SD40-2W
- SD40T-2
- SD40-2S
- SD45-2
- SD45T-2 (most are rebuilt to SD45T-2R or rebuilt to SD40T-2 or SD40-2T)
- SDP40F
- F40PH
- F40PH-2
- F40PHM-2
- F40PH-2C
- GT22CW-2
- G22W-2
- G22CU-2
- GL22C-2

== Rebuilds ==
In addition, many other earlier locomotives were rebuilt to Dash 2 standards by numerous locomotive rebuilders and railroad shops.

Among the most popular rebuilds are SD40, SD45, SD40T-2 and SD45T-2 into the functional equivalent of an SD40-2, although the frame, carbody and trucks remain the same as on the "donor" locomotive. In many cases, the rebuilds are identified as, for example, an SD40-3 or an SD40M-2, or an equivalent distinguishing identification. In some cases, the locomotive is identified simply as an SD40-2, although it is clear through physical examination that it is a rebuild. Once so rebuilt, the locomotive enters the owner's fleet as if it were a true SD40-2.

Although not as popular as the SD40-2 rebuilds, GP40s, GP39/SD39s and GP38/SD38s have also been rebuilt to the equivalent of GP40-2s, GP39-2/SD39-2s and GP38-2/SD38-2s, so significant were the reliability and serviceability advantages of the Dash 2 line.

== Subsequent models ==
Models subsequent to the Dash 2 line, for example SD50, SD60 and SD70, et al., incorporated Dash 2 improvements at the outset. In this context, the model suffix -2 is only applicable to the 40 Series, although -2 has been applied to certain variations of the later models.
