= EMD GP38 =

Model of 706 North American diesel-electric locomotive

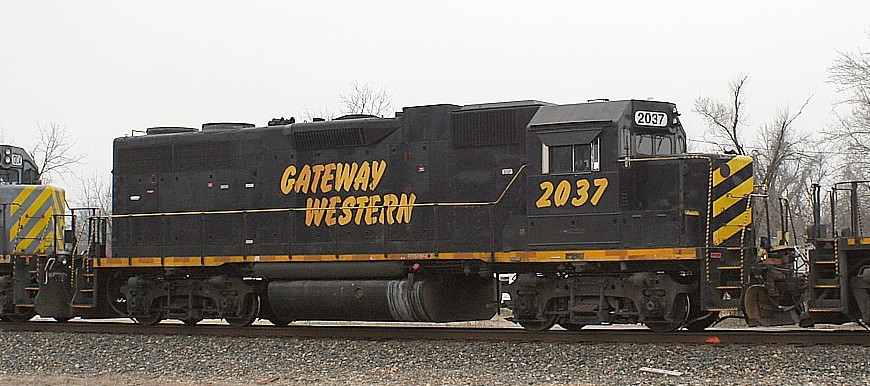
- EMD GP38 of the Gateway Western Railway
Type and origin
- Power type: Diesel-electric
- Builder: General Motors Electro-Motive Division (GM-EMD); General Motors Diesel (GMD)
- Model: GP38
- Build date: January 1966 – December 1971
- Total produced: 706
Specifications
- Configuration
  - AAR: B-B
  - UIC: Bo'Bo'
- Gauge: 4 ft 8 1/2 in (1,435 mm) standard gauge
- Fuel capacity: 2,600 US gal (9,800 L; 2,200 imp gal)
- Prime mover: EMD 16-645E
- Engine type: V16 Two-stroke diesel
- Aspiration: Roots-type blower
- Cylinders: 16
Performance figures
- Power output: 2,000 hp (1.49 MW)
Career
- Locale: North America

The EMD GP38 is a four-axle diesel-electric locomotive built by General Motors Electro-Motive Division between January 1966 and December 1971. The locomotive's prime mover was an EMD 645 16-cylinder engine that generated 2,000 horsepower (1.49 MW). The company built 706 GP38s for North American railroads.

In 1972, EMD began making an updated model, the GP38-2, as part of its Dash-2 line.

== Original orders ==
| Railroad | Quantity | Numbers | Notes |
|---|---|---|---|
| Aberdeen and Rockfish Railroad | 1 | 400 | |
| Altos Hornos de México | 4 | 130-131, 135-136 | |
| Atchison, Topeka and Santa Fe Railway | 61 | 3500-3560 | Rebuilt to GP38us and renumbered to 2300-2360, To BNSF |
| Baltimore and Ohio Railroad | 70 | 3800-3849, 4800-4819 | To CSX 2000–2049, 2100-2119 |
| Bangor and Aroostook Railroad | 8 | 81-88 | |
| Burlington Northern Railroad | 6 | 2072-2077 | Ordered as SP&S 200-205, To BNSF |
| Chesapeake and Ohio Railway | 60 | 3850-3899, 4820-4829 | To CSX 2050–2099, 2120-2129 |
| Clinchfield Railroad | 10 | 2000-2009 | To Seaboard System then CSX 2180-2189 |
| Detroit, Toledo and Ironton Railroad | 7 | 200-206 | To GTW 6200-6206. Units 200-204 part of cancelled Maine Central order |
| Erie Mining Company | 2 | 700-701 | |
| Ferrocarriles Unidos del Sureste | 2 | 512-513 | |
| Gulf, Mobile and Ohio Railroad | 20 | 701-720 | To Illinois Central Gulf then Illinois Central Railroad 9520-9539 |
| Louisville and Nashville Railroad | 20 | 4000-4019 | To Seaboard System 6221–6240, then renumbered to 2130–2149, then to CSX |
| Maine Central Railroad | 13 | 251-263 | 252 & 254 To B&M after Guilford merger. 252 & 255 now at Conway Scenic. 4 units ordered but never delivered and sold to DT&I |
| Missouri-Kansas-Texas Railroad | 4 | 300-303 | To Union Pacific |
| Missouri Pacific Railroad | 6 | 572-577 | |
| Monongahela Railway | 5 | 2000-2004 | To Conrail |
| Norfolk Southern Railway (1942–1982) | 7 | 2001-2007 | To Southern Railway renumbered 2880-2886 |
| Penn Central Transportation Company | 265 | 7675-7939 | Biggest order of GP38s, to Conrail same numbers, and then to Norfolk Southern 2880 and 2885-2957 and CSX Transportation 1950–1998, Rest to various short lines. |
| Pennsylvania-Reading Seashore Lines | 15 | 2000-2014 | Built with dual control stands and an extended cab face. To Conrail 7660–7674, and then Norfolk Southern 2943-2957 |
| Phelps Dodge Corporation | 8 | 47-54 | |
| Southern Railway | 107 | 2716-2822 | Built with high hoods. To NS with original numbers |
| Tennessee, Alabama and Georgia Railway | 1 | 80 | To Southern then NS 2879 |
| Texas Mexican Railway | 4 | 857-860 | |
| Totals | 706 | | |

== Rebuilds ==
A number of GP38s have been rebuilt into the equivalent of a GP38-2.

Conversely, a number of higher horsepower 40 Series locomotives have been rebuilt into the equivalent of a GP38-2 (GP38AC), by the removal of the turbocharger and the substitution of twin Roots blowers.

In 2007, Norfolk Southern rebuilt #2911 which is an ex Penn Central GP38 into an experimental zero-emissions Battery-Electric locomotive known as the Altoona Works BP4. The new locomotive was renumbered as NS #999. It has since been sold to Rail Propulsions Systems, where it was upgraded for eventual use in the Los Angeles Basin region.

== Preservation ==
- Baltimore & Ohio #3802 is preserved at the National Museum of Railroad History & Innovation in Baltimore, Maryland. It has been restored in its Chessie System paint scheme and is operational.
- Maine Central (MEC) #252 and #255 operate on the Conway Scenic Railroad as their #252 and #255 respectively. #255 was acquired in 2021. Both units wear the Conway Scenic's paint scheme.
- Penn Central 7706 is preserved on the West Chester Railroad as their 7706. It operates on tourist trains on the former PRR line. It wears the West Chester Railroad's paint scheme.
- Pennsylvania-Reading Seashore Lines 2000, is preserved on the Cape May Seashore Lines in Tuckahoe, New Jersey.
- Tennessee, Alabama and Georgia Railway (TAG) 80, is preserved in operating condition at the Tennessee Valley Railroad Museum in Chattanooga, Tennessee.

== See also ==
- List of GM-EMD locomotives
- List of GMD Locomotives
