= Queensland Railways 2141 class =

Class of Australian Co′Co′ diesel-electric locomotives

Type and origin
- Power type: Diesel-electric
- Builder: Clyde Engineering, Eagle Farm
- Serial number: 73-771 to 73-778
- Model: Electro-Motive Diesel GL26AC
- Build date: 1973
- Total produced: 8
- Rebuild date: 2005-2007
- Number rebuilt: 8
Specifications
- Configuration
  - UIC: Co-Co
- Gauge: 1,067 mm (3 ft 6 in)
- Length: 18.04 m (59 ft 2 in)
- Loco weight: 97.5 t (96.0 long tons; 107.5 short tons)
- Fuel type: Diesel
- Fuel capacity: 7,273 L (1,600 imp gal; 1,921 US gal)
- Prime mover: Electro-Motive Diesel 645E
- Engine type: V16 Diesel engine
- Aspiration: Roots blower
- Generator: Electro-Motive Diesel AR10
- Traction motors: Electro-Motive Diesel D29
- Cylinders: 16
- Loco brake: Dynamic
Performance figures
- Maximum speed: 80 km/h (50 mph)
- Power output: 1,491 kW (1,999 hp)
Career
- Operators: Queensland Railways
- Numbers: 2141-2148
- First run: July 1974
- Current owner: Aurizon disposition = 6 in service as 2250 class, 2 stored

The 2141 class was a class of diesel locomotives built by Clyde Engineering, Eagle Farm for Queensland Railways in 1973.

== History ==
The 2141 class were an evolution of the 2100 class. They differed by having AC alternators instead of DC generators. They were financed by the developers of the Greenvale nickel mine and were initially confined to the 229-kilometre (142 mi) Townsville to Greenvale line. They were initially numbered as the 2200 class, before being renumbered as the 2141 class in May 1982 to make the series available for the 2170 class.

Between 2005 and 2007, all were rebuilt as 2250 class locomotives.
