= EMD SD45-2 =

American diesel–electric locomotive

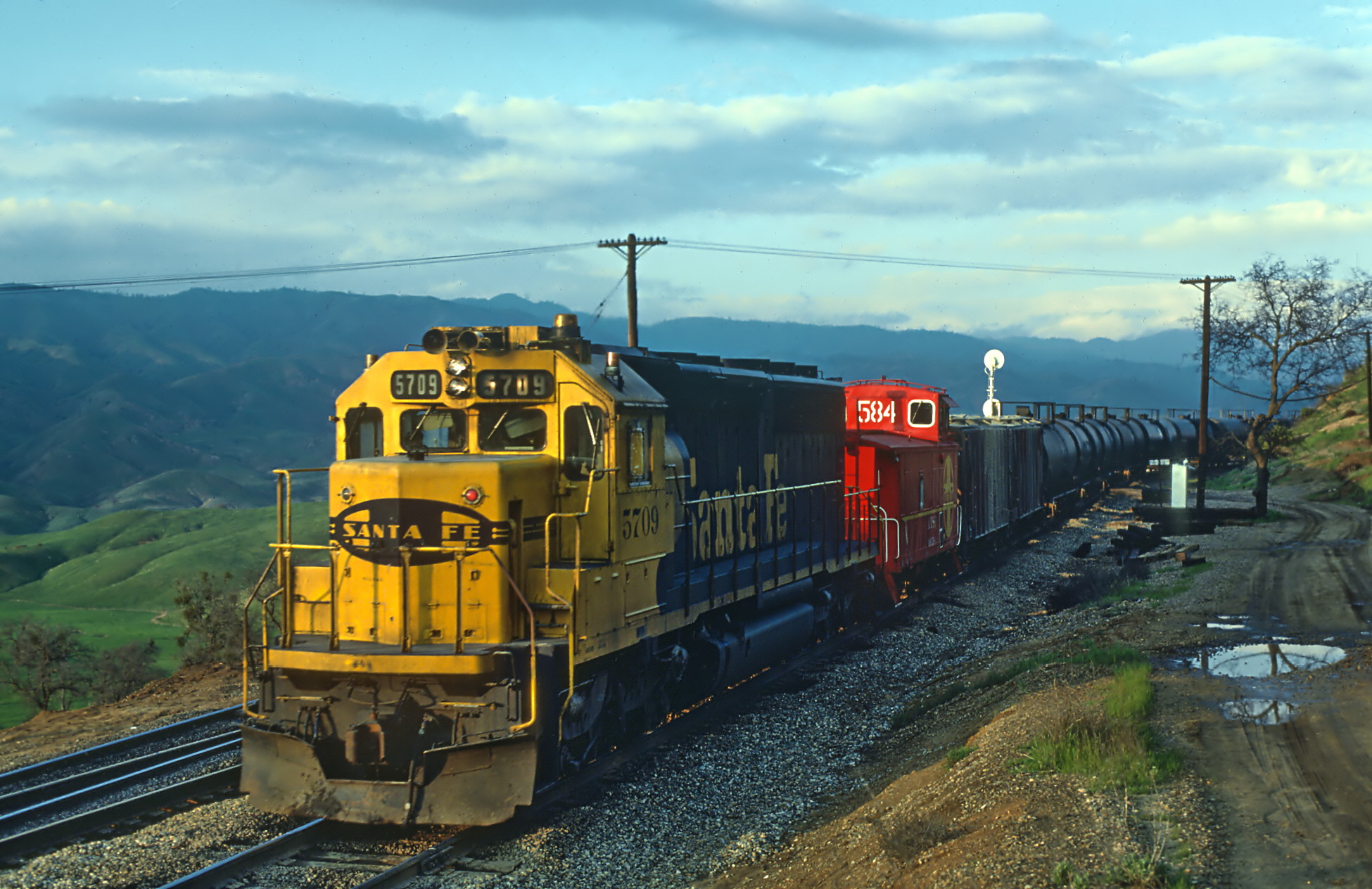
- Atchison, Topeka and Santa Fe Railway No. 5709 at Bealville, California, in April 1979
Type and origin
- Power type: Diesel
- Builder: General Motors Electro-Motive Division (EMD)
- Model: SD45-2
- Build date: April 1972– October 1974
- Total produced: 136
Specifications
- Configuration
  - AAR: C-C
  - UIC: Co'Co
- Gauge: 4 ft 8 1/2 in (1,435 mm) standard gauge
- Wheel diameter: 40"
- Length: 68 feet 10 inches (20.98 m)
- Loco weight: 368,000 lb (167,000 kg)
- Fuel type: Diesel
- Fuel capacity: 3200-4000 GAL
- Lubricant cap.: 294-466 GAL
- Water cap.: 288 GAL
- Sandbox cap.: 56cuft
- Prime mover: EMD 20-645E3
- RPM range: 315-900
- Engine type: V20 diesel
- Aspiration: Turbocharged
- Alternator: AR10
- Generator: D14
- Traction motors: D77
- Cylinders: V20
- Transmission: Electric
- MU working: Equipped
- Loco brake: Air, Dynamic brake
- Train brakes: Air
Performance figures
- Maximum speed: 65–90 mph (105–145 km/h)
- Power output: 3,600 hp (2,680 kW)
Career
- Operators: Atchison, Topeka and Santa Fe Railway, BNSF, Clinchfield Railroad, Family Lines System, CSX Transportation, Conrail, Norfolk Southern, Seaboard Coast Line Railroad
- Preserved: Atchison, Topeka and Santa Fe Railway no. 5704, CSX Transportation no. 8954
- Disposition: Two preserved, remainder either in service or in storage

The EMD SD45-2 is a 6-axle diesel-electric locomotive built by General Motors Electro-Motive Division (EMD). EMD built 136 locomotives between 1972 and 1974, primarily for the Atchison, Topeka and Santa Fe Railway (ATSF). The SD45-2 was an improved version of the EMD SD45; the primary visual difference is the absence of flared radiators on the SD45-2.

== Design ==
Part of the EMD Dash 2 line, the SD45-2 was an upgraded SD45. Like the SD45, the SD45-2 had an EMD 645E3 20-cylinder engine producing 3,600 horsepower (2,680 kW). The main spotting difference between an SD45 and an SD45-2 was the long hood and the rear radiator. On the SD45 the long hood is flared whereas on the SD45-2 it is vertical and the rear cooling fans are more spread out on the top of the rear of the long hood.

A few cabless SD45-2Bs were built by Santa Fe from units undergoing remanufacturing. In all but one case (5510), the dynamic brakes were moved to the opposite end of the hood from the radiators; they were originally near the center of the hood.

In September 2015, Norfolk Southern revealed SD45-2 #1700, which was painted back to its Erie Lackawanna color scheme at Chattanooga, Tennessee.

== Preservation ==
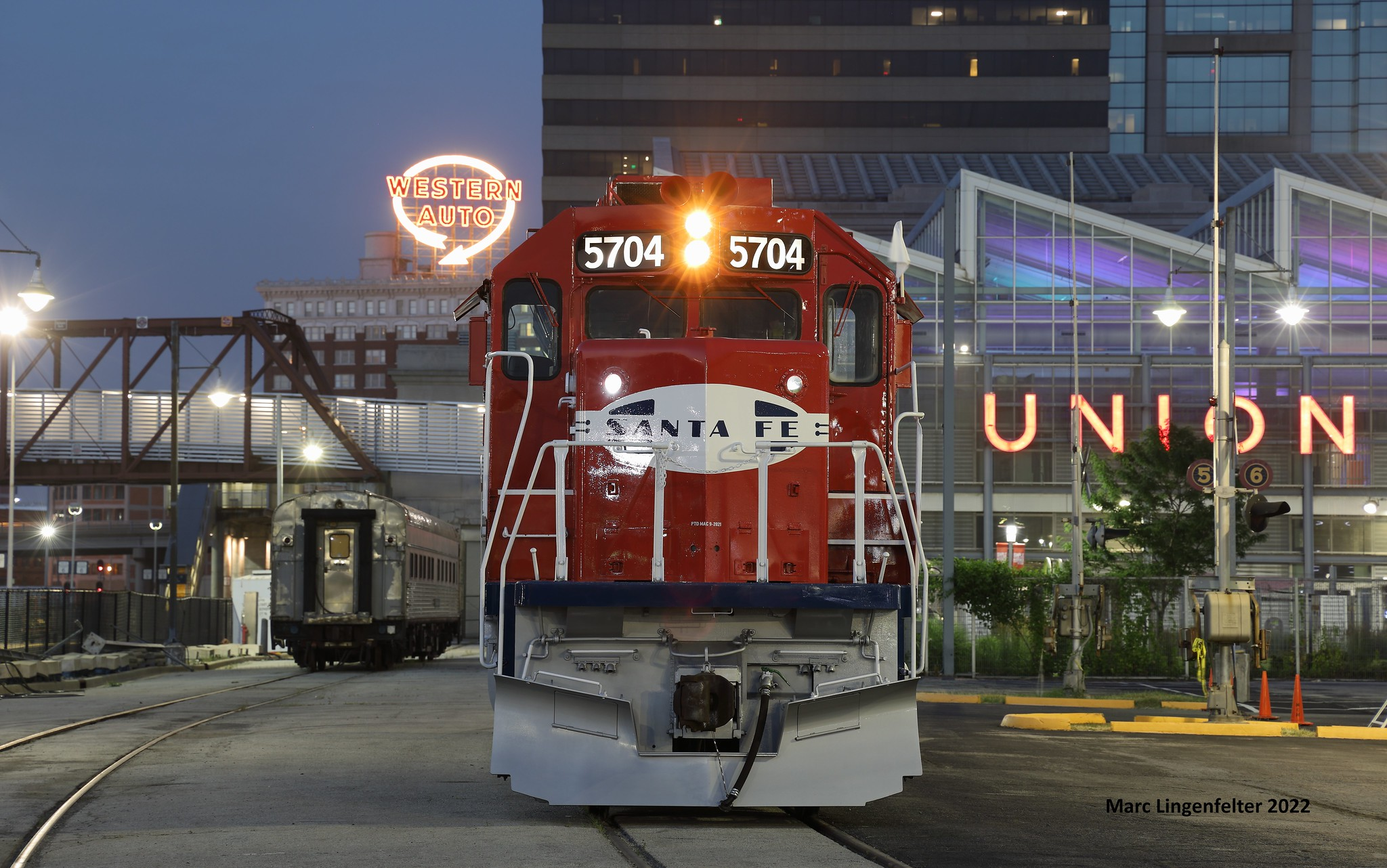
ATSF #5704 in its original bicentennial livery at Kansas City, Missouri on June 17, 2022

- ATSF #5704 is preserved at the Southern California Railway Museum (SCRM) in Perris, California.
- CSX #8954 (ex-SCL #2049) is preserved at the Southeastern Railway Museum in Duluth, Georgia. It was donated by CSX in August 2018, making it the first SD45-2 to be preserved.

== Original owners ==
Railroad	Quantity	Road Numbers	Notes
Atchison, Topeka and Santa Fe Railway	90	5625-5714.	To BNSF
Clinchfield Railroad	18	3607-3624.	To Family Lines System then to Seaboard System and now at CSX Transportation
Erie Lackawanna Railway	13	3669-3681.	To Conrail and then to Norfolk Southern and CSX Transportation, those to CSX downgraded to SD40-2 standards.
Seaboard Coast Line Railroad	15	2045-2059.	To Family Lines System then to Seaboard System and now at CSX Transportation,
Totals	136		
