= Queensland Railways 2170 class =

Class of Australian Co′Co′ diesel-electric locomotives

Queensland Railways 2170 class South African Class 35-800
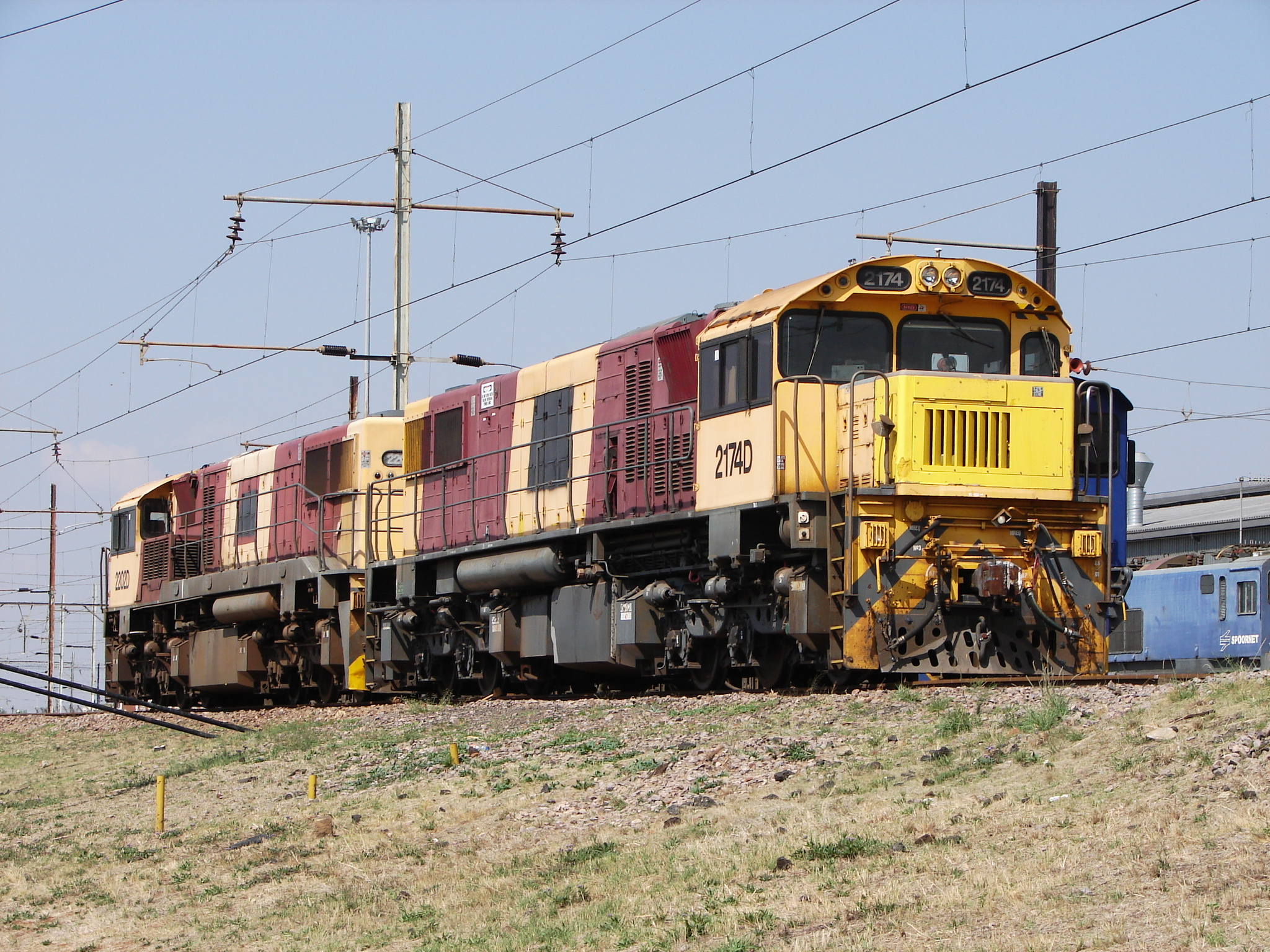
- Transnet Freight Rail D35-802, Pyramid South, Gauteng, September 2015
Type and origin
- Power type: Diesel-electric
- Designer: Clyde Engineering
- Builder: Clyde Engineering at Comeng, Rocklea
- Serial number: 82-1100 to 82-1109; 82-1125; 83-1146 to 83-1178; 84-1218
- Model: EMD GL26C-2
- Build date: 1982-1984
- Total produced: 45
Specifications
- Configuration
  - AAR: C-C
  - UIC: Co'Co'
  - Commonwealth: Co-Co
- Gauge: 1,067 mm (3 ft 6 in)
- Wheel diameter: 1,016 mm (40.0 in)
- Wheelbase
  - Bogie: 3,810 mm (12 ft 6.0 in)
- Pivot centres: 11,684 mm (38 ft 4.0 in)
- Length
  - Over couplers: 18,059 mm (59 ft 3.0 in)
  - Over body: 17,043 mm (55 ft 11.0 in)
- Width: 2,771 mm (9 ft 1.1 in)
- Height: 3,900 mm (12 ft 9.5 in)
- Axle load: 16,150 kg (35,600 lb)
- Adhesive weight: 97,500 kg (215,000 lb)
- Loco weight: 97,500 kg (215,000 lb)
- Fuel type: Diesel
- Fuel capacity: 2202-2210: 7,273 L (1,600 imp gal); All others: 5,950 L (1,310 imp gal)
- Lubricant cap.: 918 litres (202 imp gal)
- Coolant cap.: 795 litres (175 imp gal)
- Sandbox cap.: 0.68 m^{3} (24 cu ft)
- Prime mover: GM-EMD 16-645E
- RPM range: 315-900
  - RPM idle: 315
  - Maximum RPM: 900
- Engine type: V16 Diesel engine
- Aspiration: Roots blower
- Alternator: Traction: EMD AR6, 600 V DC; Companion: EMD CA5. 180 V DC; Auxiliary: EMD A3
- Generator: EMD AR6-G-D18
- Traction motors: Six EMD D29; Wheelslip systems: EMD Dash 2 (2171, 2201-11, 2214); ZTR Nexsys II (all others)
- Gear ratio: 63:14
- Loco brake: Westinghouse 26L, Dynamic
- Train brakes: Gardner Denver WBO compressor
- Safety systems: Fischer Electronic vigilance system Wabtec TDR9000 event recorder ThermAir RD1-1000 air conditioner
- Couplers: AAR knuckle
Performance figures
- Maximum speed: 100 km/h (62 mph)
- Power output
  - Starting: 1,641 kW (2,201 hp)
  - Continuous: 1,492 kW (2,001 hp)
- Tractive effort
  - Starting: 286 kN (64,000 lbf) @ 30% adh.
  - Continuous: 213 kN (48,000 lbf) @ 19.8 km/h (12.3 mph)
- Dynamic brake peak effort: 179 kN (40,000 lbf)
Career
- Operators: Aurizon; Queensland Rail; Transnet Freight Rail; Ferronor
- Class: QR 2170 class TFR Class 35-800
- Number in class: 45
- Numbers: QR: 2170-2214; TFR: D35-801 to D35-814
- Delivered: 1982-1984
- First run: March 1982
- Disposition: 2 scrapped

The Queensland Railways 2170 class is an Australian diesel-electric locomotive.

All were built between 1982 and 1984 by Clyde Engineering at Comeng's Rocklea plant for Queensland Rail. Most have been sold for further use overseas with seventeen going to South Africa and twelve to Ferronor in Chile.

== The 2100 class family ==
The Queensland Railways 2100 class first entered service in 1970. The class family consists of the 2100, 2130, 2150 and 2170 classes. It formed the mainstay of Queensland Rail's coal haulage from the opening of the Goonyella line until electrification in the late 1980s.

A new batch of locomotives was ordered with the opening of each new mine and the 2170 class entered service when the German Creek, Oaky Creek and Blair Athol coal mines came into operation. Eleven units were built with Locotrol equipment.

== Manufacturer ==
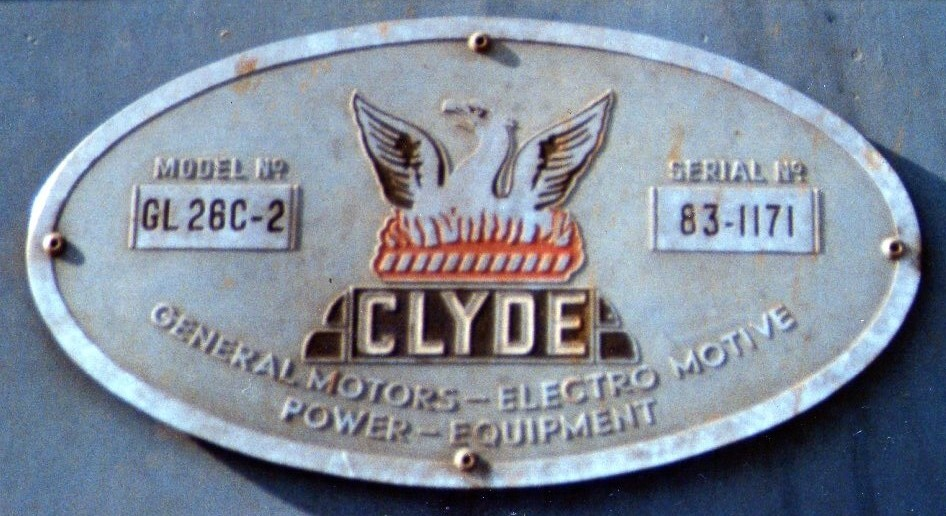
Builder's plate on 2207

The 2170 class was an evolution of the 2150 class. It differed from the earlier class mainly by having modified traction motors, Dash 2 modular electrical cabinets and air-conditioned cabs.

The locomotives were built by Clyde Engineering at Comeng's Rocklea plant between 1982 and 1984.

== Modifications ==
Since the late 1980s, the locomotives have been modified. Modified locomotives had a letter suffix added to their unit numbers. These modifications include:

- A suffix. Weight reduction by reducing fuel tank capacity by 1,300 litres, 2195 only
- D suffix. A driver-only operation (DOO) cab modification, which included lowering the nose of the locomotive and the addition of a larger windscreen for the driver.
- F suffix. The addition of auxiliary fuel tanks.

In 1992–1993, all except numbers 2202 to 2210 were fitted with Automatic train protection (ATP). Between 1995 and 1999 eleven received extended cabs to relieve cramping caused by the ATP equipment.

In 2000, an overhaul program commenced which included the fitting of maxi-cabs, similar to that of the 2300 class, to all 43 remaining units. After this, thirty were in "D" configuration with the other thirteen in "F" configuration. Some were fitted with ZTR Nexsys II traction control systems.

== Service ==
The 2170 class entered service on coal haulage on the Goonyella line. After electrification, all except numbers 2202 to 2210 were placed into general traffic between Brisbane and the South West and on the North Coast line between Rockhampton and Townsville. Meanwhile, numbers 2202 to 2210 were relocated to Townsville in 1988 to haul Greenvale mineral trains and, from 1993, trains on the Mount Isa line. In the late 1990s, they were re-allocated to Gladstone to operate Moura line coal trains.

When the 4100 class entered service, the 2170 class began to be withdrawn from service. Along with Queensland Rail's freight operations, all, apart from 2195, passed to QR National (now Aurizon) in July 2010.

== Disposal ==
Many of the 2170 class have been sold by Aurizon.

- In August 2013, three were placed on consignment with Apex Industrial and exported to South Africa. They were shipped from Brisbane to Durban on the ship BBC Carolina on 22 August 2013. Two were sold to African Rail & Traction Services while the third went to RRL Grindrod Locomotives.
- In July 2014, three were sold by Aurizon back to Queensland Rail to haul its passenger trains.
- In 2014, fourteen were purchased by Transnet Freight Rail and exported to South Africa as the Class 35-800.
- In June 2016, twelve were sold to Ferronor in Chile.

== Transnet Freight Rail ==
The Transnet locomotives were renumbered in the range from D35-801 to D35-814, following their Aurizon number sequence and retaining the driver-only operation (DOO) "D" as a prefix to the unit number.

At least eight of the Class 35-800 units were allocated to the Western Cape system and are based at Bellville Locomotive Depot. Of those, at least six have been superficially repainted in a shop version of the red Transnet Freight Rail livery and appear to be in service working the West Coast lines. In most cases the old Aurizon numbers are still visible under the red paint. Repainting was done only on the upper bodywork and everything from the running boards down were left as it was. This includes the buffer beams and cowcatchers, probably since the Australian yellow and grey chevron pattern on the buffer beams is an inverted version of the yellow and grey pattern used by Transnet Freight Rail. At least four of the remaining units are believed to have been allocated to the Eastern Cape system.

With the addition of the Class 35-800s, the South African Class 35 locomotive family now consists of five classes, the General Electric (GE) Classes 35-000 and 35-400 and the GM-EMD Classes 35-200, 35-600 and 35-800.

== Watco Australia ==
In 2019, after being awarded a grain haulage contract in Queensland, Watco Australia purchased 5 of the 2170s sold to Transnet (2180, 2181, 2183, 2184 and 2188) and shipped them back to Queensland by NGL Projects. They arrived at the Port of Brisbane on 2 July 2019, and the first loco, 2188D, was transferred to Watco's new facilities in Warwick on 31 July 2019. They will be used on Watco's grain and cattle services, in conjunction with the brand new WRA class, currently being built by NRE in the United States.

== Status table ==
The present owner, builder's works numbers, dates in service and disposition are listed in the table.

Queensland Railways 2170 class South African Class 35-800
Loco no.	Owner	Works no.	In service	Withdrawn	Disposition
2170D	Ferronor	82-1100	3 Mar 1982		
2171D	Ferronor	82-1101	9 Mar 1982		
2172F	African Rail & Traction Services	82-1102	19 Mar 1982		
2173D	Transnet Freight Rail	82-1103	31 Mar 1982		TFR no. D35-801 likely
2174D	Watco Australia	82-1104	15 Apr 1982		TFR no. D35-802
2175D		82-1105	27 Apr 1982	25 Aug 1989	Scrapped
2176D	Ferronor	82-1106	7 May 1982		
2177D	Watco Australia	82-1107	21 Jun 1982		TFR no. D35-803
2178D	Ferronor	82-1108	1 Jun 1982		
2179D	Ferronor	82-1109	16 Jun 1982		
2180D	Watco Australia	82-1125	25 Jun 1982		TFR no. D35-804
2181D	Watco Australia	83-1146	10 Feb 1983		TFR no. D35-805
2182D	Aurizon	83-1147	22 Feb 1983		In service
2183D	Watco Australia	83-1148	3 Mar 1983		TFR no. D35-806
2184D	Watco Australia	83-1149	9 Mar 1983		TFR no. D35-807
2185D	Grindrod Locomotives	83-1150	21 Mar 1983		
2186F	Ferronor	83-1151	29 Mar 1983		
2187D		83-1152	8 Apr 1983	7 Aug 1995	Scrapped
2188D	Watco Australia	83-1153	20 Apr 1983		TFR no. D35-808
2189F	Aurizon	83-1154	4 May 1983		In service
2190D	Aurizon	83-1155	16 May 1983		In service
2191F	Aurizon	83-1156	24 May 1983		In service
2192F	Aurizon	83-1157	1 Jun 1983		Stored
2193F	Aurizon	83-1158	14 Jun 1983		Stored
2194F	Aurizon	83-1159	22 Jun 1983		In service
2195A	Queensland Rail	83-1160	29 Jun 1983		In service
2196F	Aurizon	83-1161	14 Jul 1983		In service
2197F	Aurizon	83-1162	28 Jul 1983		Stored Redbank Railway Workshops
2198F	Aurizon	84-1218	22 Feb 1984		Stored
2199F	Aurizon	83-1163	10 Aug 1983		Stored
2200F	Aurizon	83-1164	17 Aug 1983		In service
2201D	Ferronor	83-1165	31 Aug 1983		
2202D	Watco Australia	83-1166	9 Sep 1983		TFR no. D35-809
2203D	Ferronor	83-1167	19 Sep 1983		
2204D	Watco Australia	83-1168	30 Sep 1983		
2205D	Transnet Freight Rail	83-1169	10 Oct 1983	11 Jan 2001	TFR no. D35-810 likely
2206D	Watco Australia	83-1170	19 Oct 1983	11 Jan 2001	TFR no. D35-811
2207D	Transnet Freight Rail	83-1171	28 Oct 1983		TFR no. D35-812
2208D	Aurizon	83-1172	9 Nov 1983		In service
2209D	Transnet Freight Rail	83-1173	21 Nov 1983		TFR no. D35-813
2210D	Transnet Freight Rail	83-1174	30 Nov 1983		TFR no. D35-814
2211D	Ferronor	83-1175	14 Dec 1983		
2212D	Ferronor	83-1176	12 Jan 1984		
2213D	Ferronor	83-1177	23 Jan 1984		
2214D	Ferronor	83-1178	3 Feb 1984		

== Gallery ==
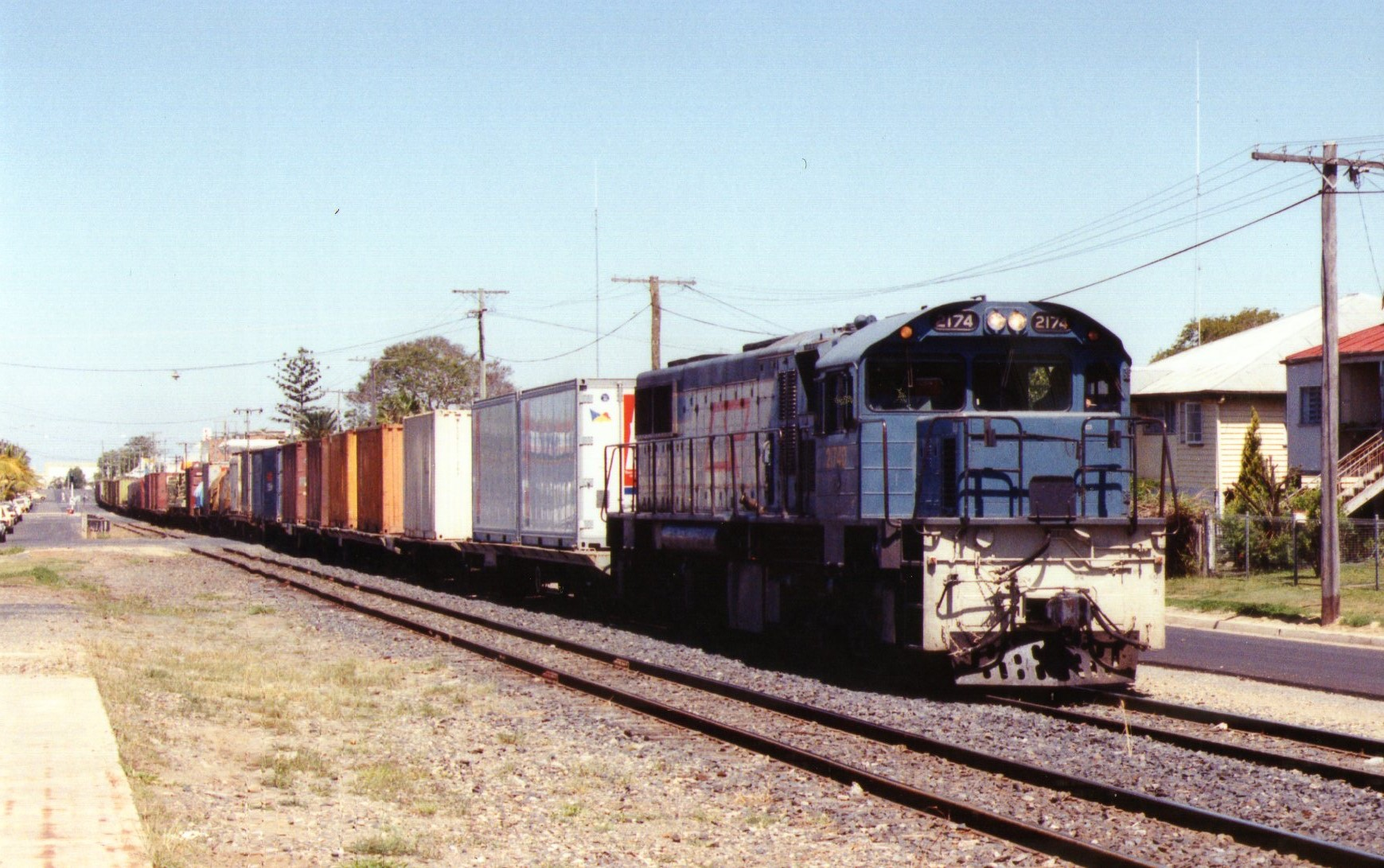
Queensland Rail 2174D traversing Denison St, Rockhampton, c. 2000
(Now TFR no. D35-802)

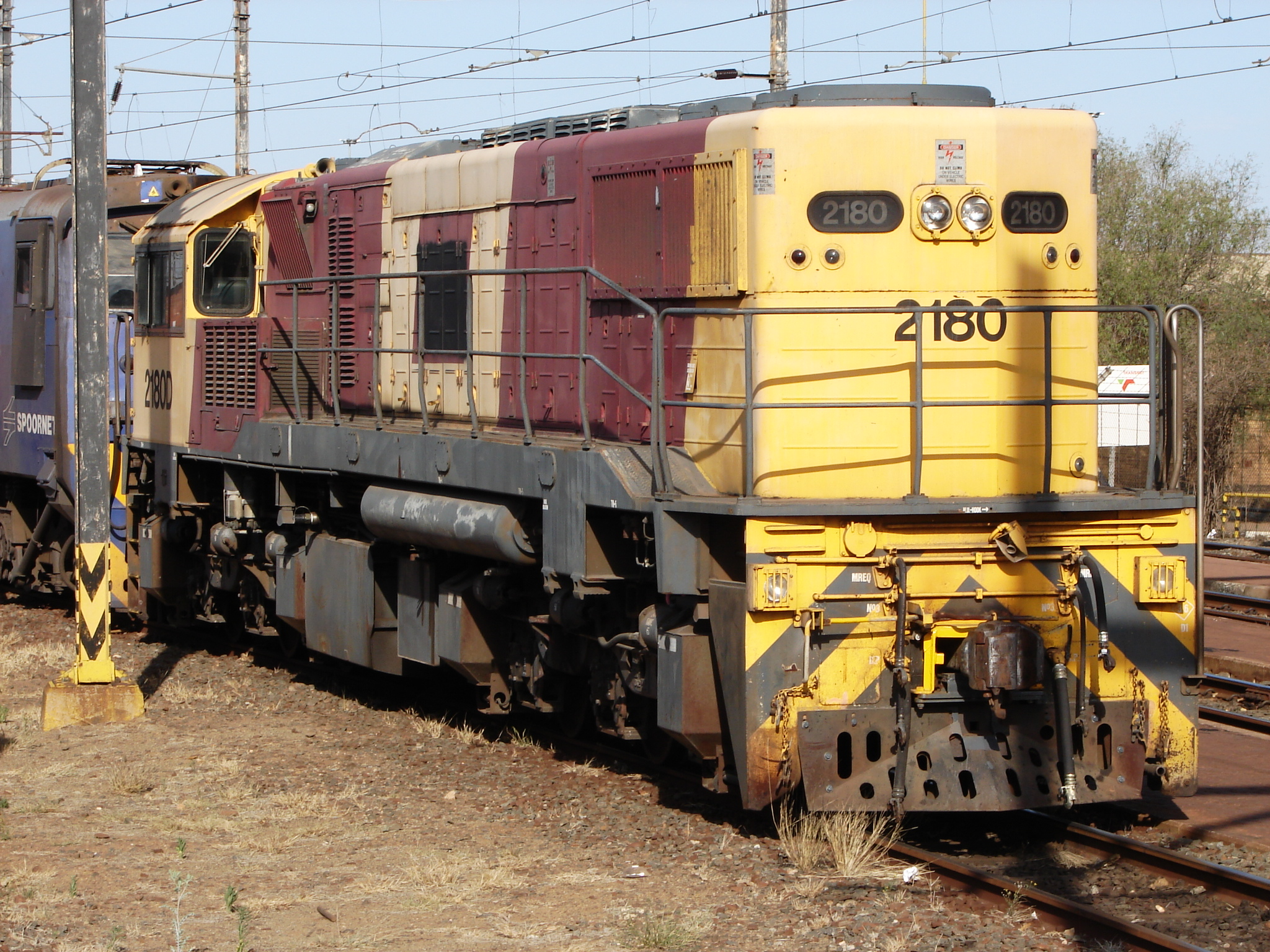
No. 2180D at Beaconsfield, Kimberley, 7 October 2015
(renumbered D35-804, bought by Watco, renumbered again to 2180W)

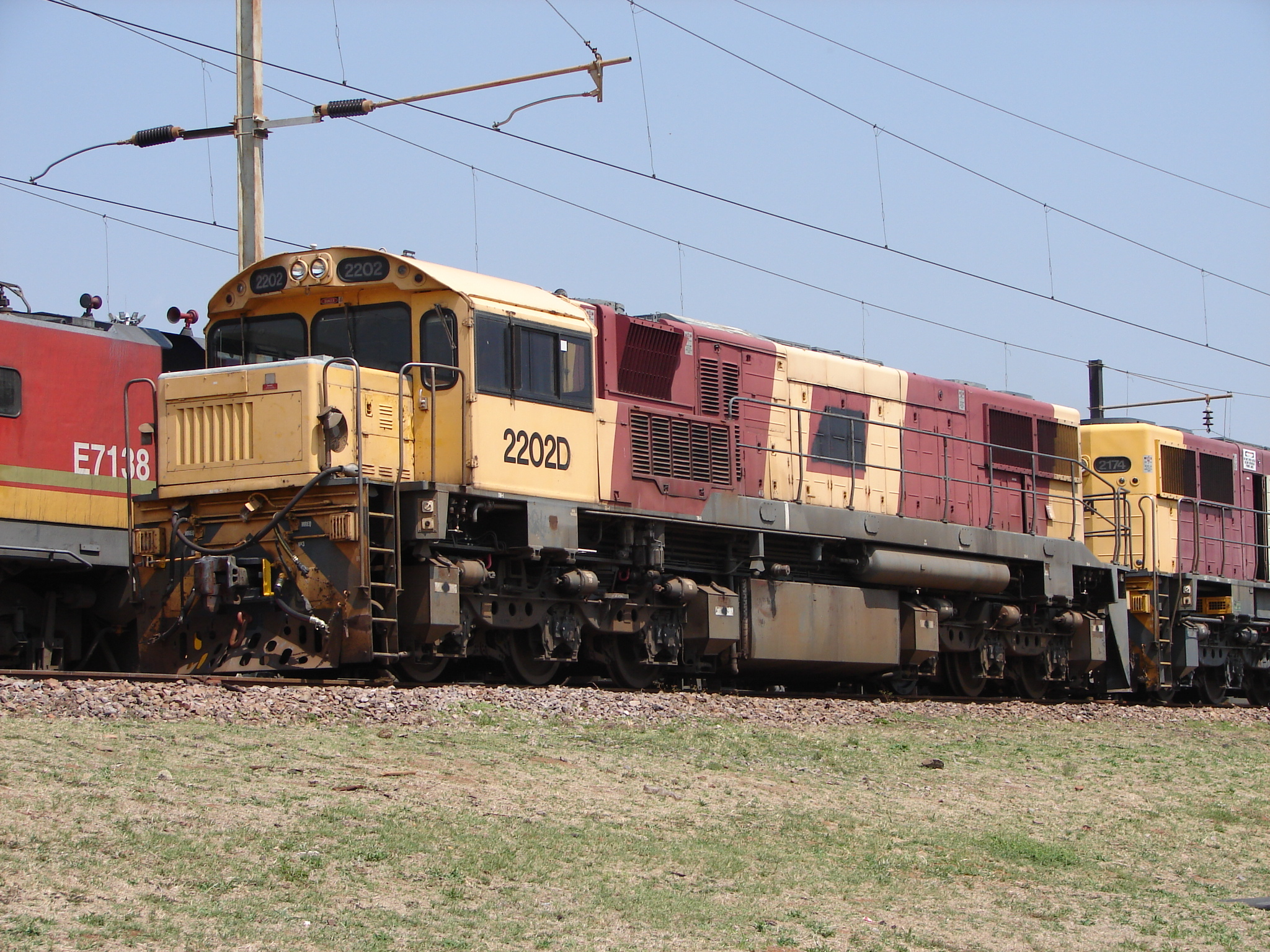
No. 2202D at Pyramid South, Gauteng, 22 September 2015
(Now TFR no. D35-809)

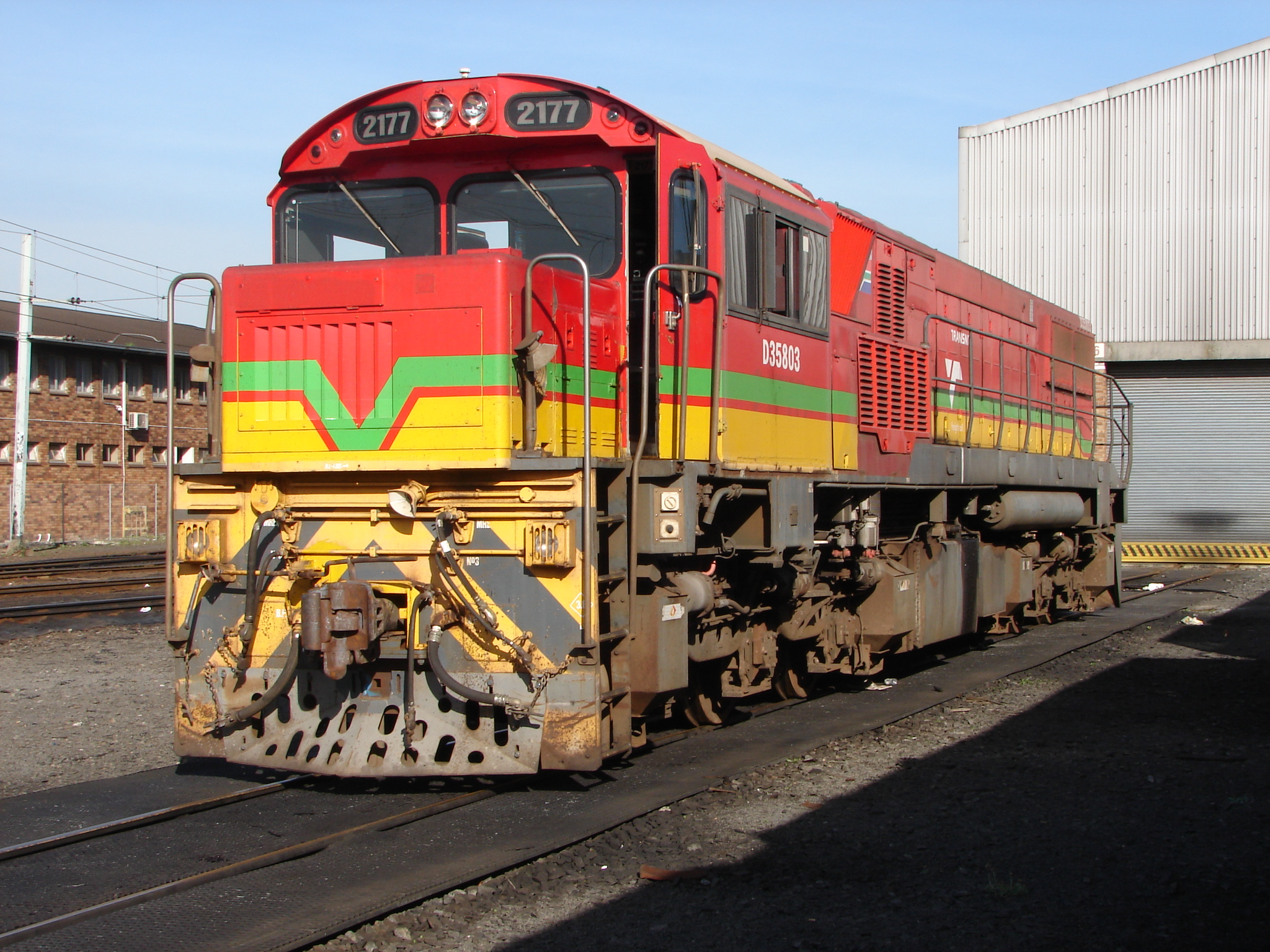
TFR no. D35-803 at Bellville Loco, 4 July 2017
(Ex QR 2170 Class no. 2177D)

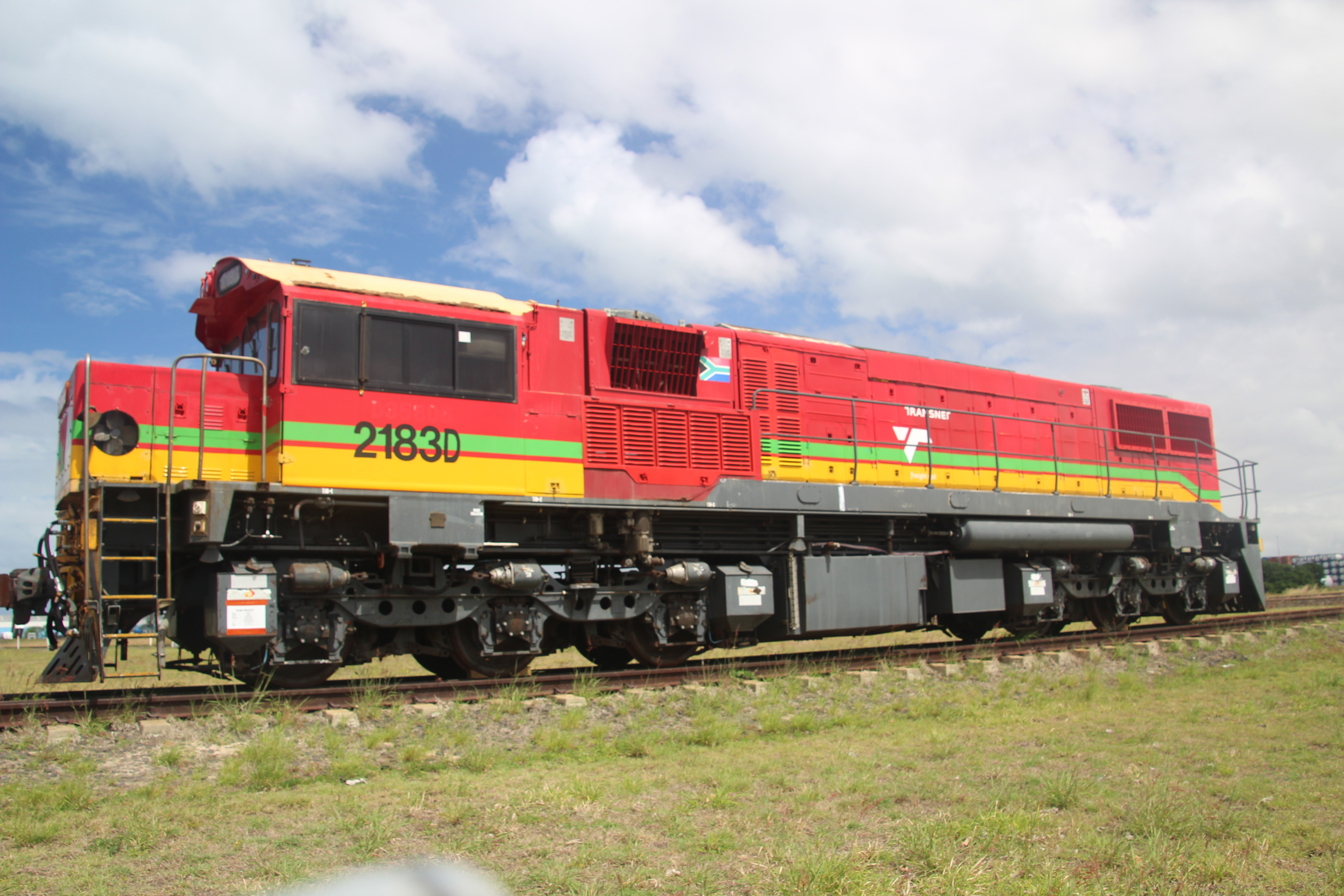
2183D at Fisherman's Island
