= South African Class S2 0-8-0 =

1952 design of steam shunting locomotive

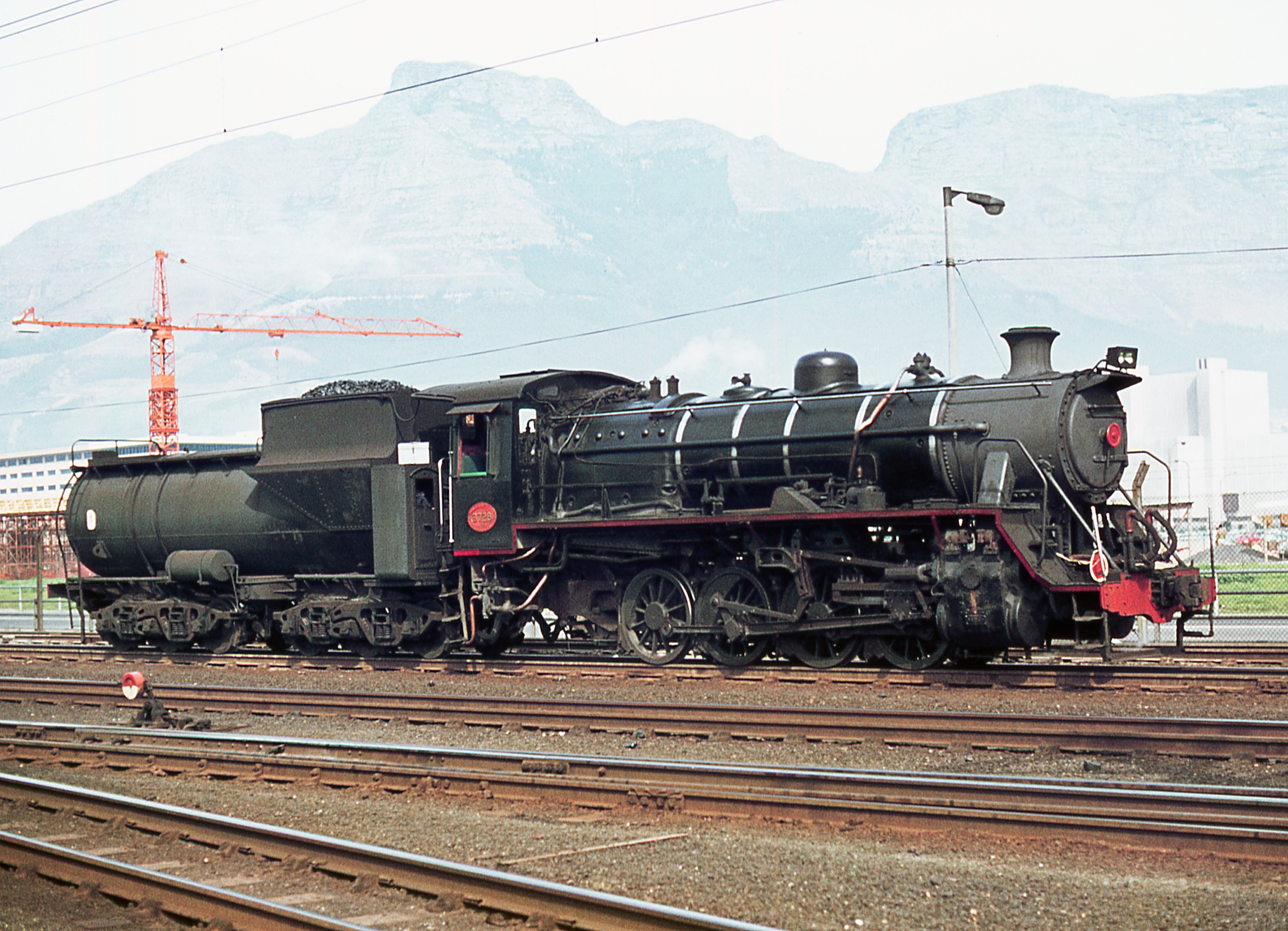
- No. 3728 in the Table Bay yard, August 1973
Type and origin
- Power type: Steam
- Designer: South African Railways (L.C. Grubb)
- Builder: Friedrich Krupp AG
- Serial number: 2966–3065
- Model: Class S2
- Build date: 1952–1953
- Total produced: 100
Specifications
- Configuration
  - Whyte: 0-8-0 (Eight-coupled)
  - UIC: Dh2
- Driver: 3rd coupled axle
- Gauge: 3 ft 6 in (1,067 mm) Cape gauge
- Coupled dia.: 48 in (1,219 mm)
- Tender wheels: 34 in (864 mm)
- Wheelbase: 51 ft 2 5/8 in (15,611 mm)
  - Engine: 12 ft 9 in (3,886 mm)
  - Tender: 24 ft 7 1/4 in (7,499 mm)
  - Tender bogie: 8 ft 8 in (2,642 mm)
- Length
  - Over couplers: 63 ft 3 3/4 in (19,298 mm)
- Height: 12 ft 4 in (3,759 mm)
- Frame type: Cast
- Axle load: 13 LT (13,210 kg)
  - 1st coupled: 13 LT (13,210 kg)
  - 2nd coupled: 12 LT 6 cwt (12,500 kg)
  - 3rd coupled: 11 LT 4 cwt 3 qtr (11,420 kg)
  - 4th coupled: 11 LT 2 cwt 3 qtr (11,320 kg)
  - Tender bogie: Bogie 1: 26 LT 15 cwt 3 qtr (27,220 kg); Bogie 2: 26 LT 12 cwt 1 qtr (27,040 kg)
  - Tender axle: 8 LT 18 cwt 2 qtr (9,068 kg)
- Adhesive weight: 47 LT 13 cwt 2 qtr (48,440 kg)
- Loco weight: 47 LT 13 cwt 2 qtr (48,440 kg)
- Tender weight: 54 LT 8 cwt (55,270 kg)
- Total weight: 102 LT 1 cwt 2 qtr (103,700 kg)
- Tender type: MY1 (Buckeye 3-axle bogies)
- Fuel type: Coal
- Fuel capacity: 8 LT (8.1 t)
- Water cap.: 4,200 imp gal (19,100 L)
- Firebox
  - Type: Round-top
  - Grate area: 30 sq ft (2.8 m^{2})
- Boiler
  - Pitch: 8 ft 4 in (2,540 mm)
  - Diameter: 4 ft 6 7/8 in (1,394 mm)
  - Tube plates: 13 ft 5 3/8 in (4,099 mm)
  - Small tubes: 91: 2 in (51 mm)
  - Large tubes: 18: 5 1/2 in (140 mm)
- Boiler pressure: 195 psi (1,344 kPa)
- Safety valve: Pop
- Heating surface
  - Firebox: 113 sq ft (10.5 m^{2})
  - Tubes: 979 sq ft (91.0 m^{2})
  - Total surface: 1,092 sq ft (101.5 m^{2})
- Superheater
  - Heating area: 330 sq ft (31 m^{2})
- Cylinders: Two
- Cylinder size: 18 in (457 mm) bore 26 in (660 mm) stroke
- Valve gear: Walschaerts
- Valve type: Piston
- Couplers: AAR knuckle
Performance figures
- Maximum speed: 25 mph (40 km/h)
- Tractive effort: 25,300 lbf (113 kN) @ 75%
Career
- Operators: South African Railways
- Class: Class S2
- Number in class: 100
- Numbers: 3701–3800
- Delivered: 1952–1953
- First run: 1952
- Withdrawn: 1985
- The 3rd coupled axle had flangeless wheels

The South African Railways Class S2 0-8-0 of 1952 was a steam locomotive.

In 1952 and 1953, the South African Railways placed one hundred Class S2 shunting steam locomotives with an 0-8-0 wheel arrangement in service.

== Design specifications ==
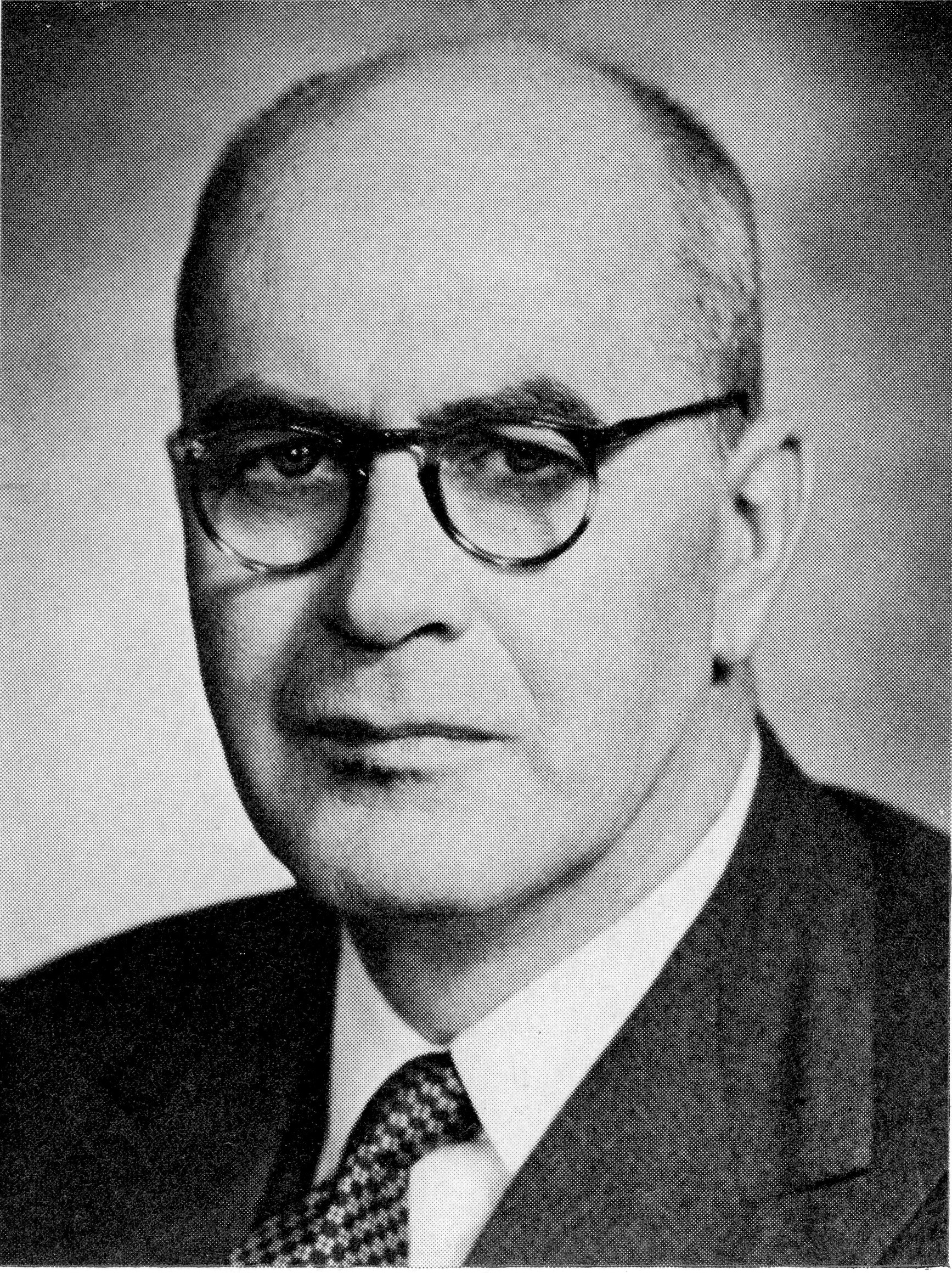
L.C. Grubb

By 1952, the need arose for shunting locomotives with a light axle load for harbour work, where most of the trackwork was laid with light rail. Under the direction of L.C. Grubb, Chief Mechanical Engineer of the South African Railways (SAR) from 1949 to 1954, specifications were prepared for a light locomotive with the 0-8-0 wheel arrangement which had already been proven successful with the Classes S and S1 shunting engines. To keep the total weight of the engine and tender down to approximately 100 long tons (101.6 tonnes), it was to be equipped with the Watson Standard no. 1 boiler, the smallest of the standard boilers.

== Manufacturer ==
When tenders were called for, a number of firms responded, but all except one stated that it would not be possible to construct the locomotive within the stipulated weight. Only the firm of Friedrich Krupp AG of Essen in Germany undertook to build the locomotives to the required specifications.

When design work commenced after the signing of the contract, however, it was discovered that the other tendering firms had been correct and that the locomotives could not be built within the specified weight limit, if the specifications were to be adhered to. It was eventually agreed that Krupp should design a suitable smaller boiler which would bring the locomotive's weight down to a level which would be in line with the stipulated maximum. The result was an engine which had the appearance of a Cape gauge locomotive with a narrow gauge boiler, particularly when viewed from the front.

One hundred Class S2 locomotives were subsequently built by Krupp and delivered in 1952 and 1953, numbered in the range from 3701 to 3800. Even with the smaller Krupp-designed boiler, the locomotive's eventual working order weight was still more than 2 long tons (2.0 tonnes) over the desired maximum.

== Characteristics ==
The locomotive had Walschaerts valve gear and was superheated. Its cast steel frame was a single casting with separately attached cylinders. As built, the third coupled axle had flangeless wheels to negotiate the tight curves found in docks.

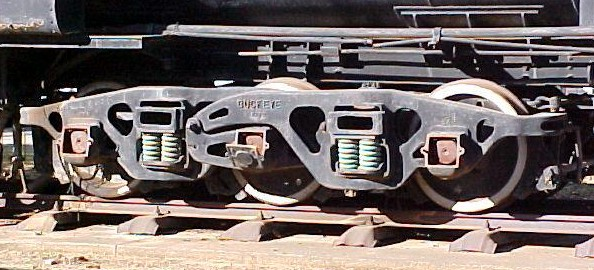
Buckeye bogie

Like the Class 24 and the last batch of the Class 19D, the Class S2 had a tank wagon type tender, similar in appearance to the American Vanderbilt type tender, with cylindrical water tanks and commonly known as a Torpedo tender. Its Type MY1 tender also rode on three-axle Buckeye bogies to reduce the axle load, but was much shorter than the Type MX tender of the Class 19D and with a different coal bunker top design than that of the Type MY tender of the Class 24. As was done with the tenders of the Classes S and S1, the top sides of the coal bunker were scalloped out to improve the crew's rearward field of vision.

== Service ==
Most of the Class S2 locomotives were placed in shunting service in the Durban, Table Bay and Port Elizabeth harbours where they replaced a variety of aged 4-6-0, 4-8-0 and 4-8-2T locomotives. Although about twenty were also allocated to yards on the Witwatersrand and in the Eastern Transvaal where they were employed in light general shunting, the Class S2 became synonymous with harbour shunting from their arrival in 1952 right through to the end of steam in 1982.

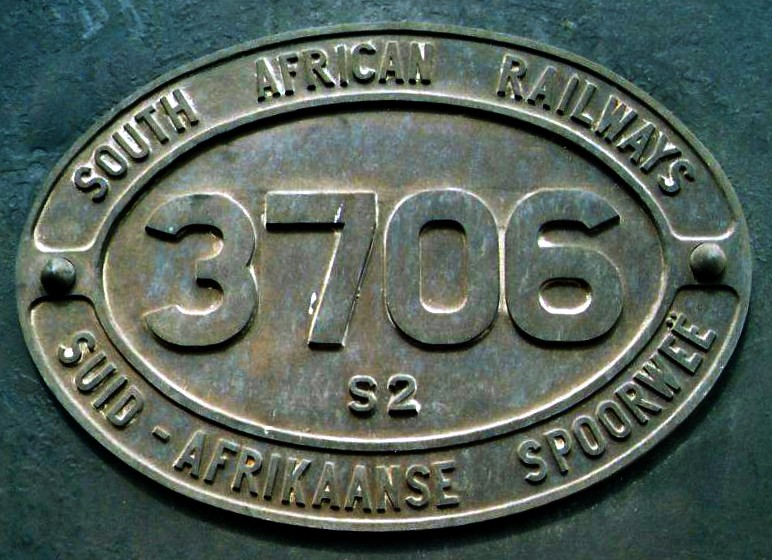

In Cape Town, 23 Class S2 engines were initially allocated to Paarden Island where they replaced a variety of aged Class 6 locomotives in dock shunting. They also relieved larger locomotives like Class 3R and others from shunting to be dedicated to pickup work and hauler service between the harbour and the Bellville yard. Due to being restricted to a maximum speed of 25 miles per hour (40 kilometres per hour), the Class S2 was considered unsuitable for the dual role of hauling and shunting. Their number in Cape Town rose to more than thirty by the mid-1970s, when eleven engines would handle the dock shunting on a daily basis and six or seven could often be seen coupled together going to and from Paarden Eiland shed at shift changes.

In 1972, two new Blue Train sets built by Union Carriage & Wagon in Nigel entered service and were stabled at Capital Park in Pretoria. Class S2 no. 3793 served as carriage shunt engine at Capital Park at the time and was painted in blue livery to match the Blue Train stock. It was eventually replaced by Class 19D no. 2749 which was also painted blue.

During 1981, four Class S2 locomotives were hired to Mozambique for dock shunting in Maputo.

With one exception, the whole Class S2 fleet was withdrawn from service between 1979 and 1982. The last Class S2 locomotive in service was the shed pilot at Waterval Boven, which remained in service until 1985. In Cape Town and Durban they were replaced by Class 36-000 or Class 36-200 light general purpose diesel-electric locomotives, but in Port Elizabeth their initial replacements were older steam locomotives of larger capacity.

== Commemoration ==
A 10c postage stamp depicting a Class S2 locomotive was one of a set of four commemorative postage stamps that were issued by the South African Post Office on 27 April 1983 to commemorate the steam locomotives of South Africa which were rapidly being withdrawn from service at the time. The artwork and stamp design was by the noted stamp designer and artist Hein Botha.

The particular locomotive depicted was no. 3781. The outline of a traditional SAR locomotive number plate was used as a commemorative cancellation for De Aar on the date of issue.

== Preservation ==
Of the Class S2, three survived into preservation. By 2018

Number	Works nmr	THF / Private	Leaselend / Owner	Current Location	Outside SOUTH AFRICA	?
3706	Krupp 2971	THF	Transnet Heritage Foundation	Outiniqua Transport Museum		
3765	Krupp 3030	THF		Krugersdorp Locomotive Depot		
3778	Krupp 3043	Private	Railway Society of South Africa	Masons Mill Locomotive Depot		

== Illustration ==
One locomotive, no. 3706, was preserved in the Outeniqua Transport Museum in George.

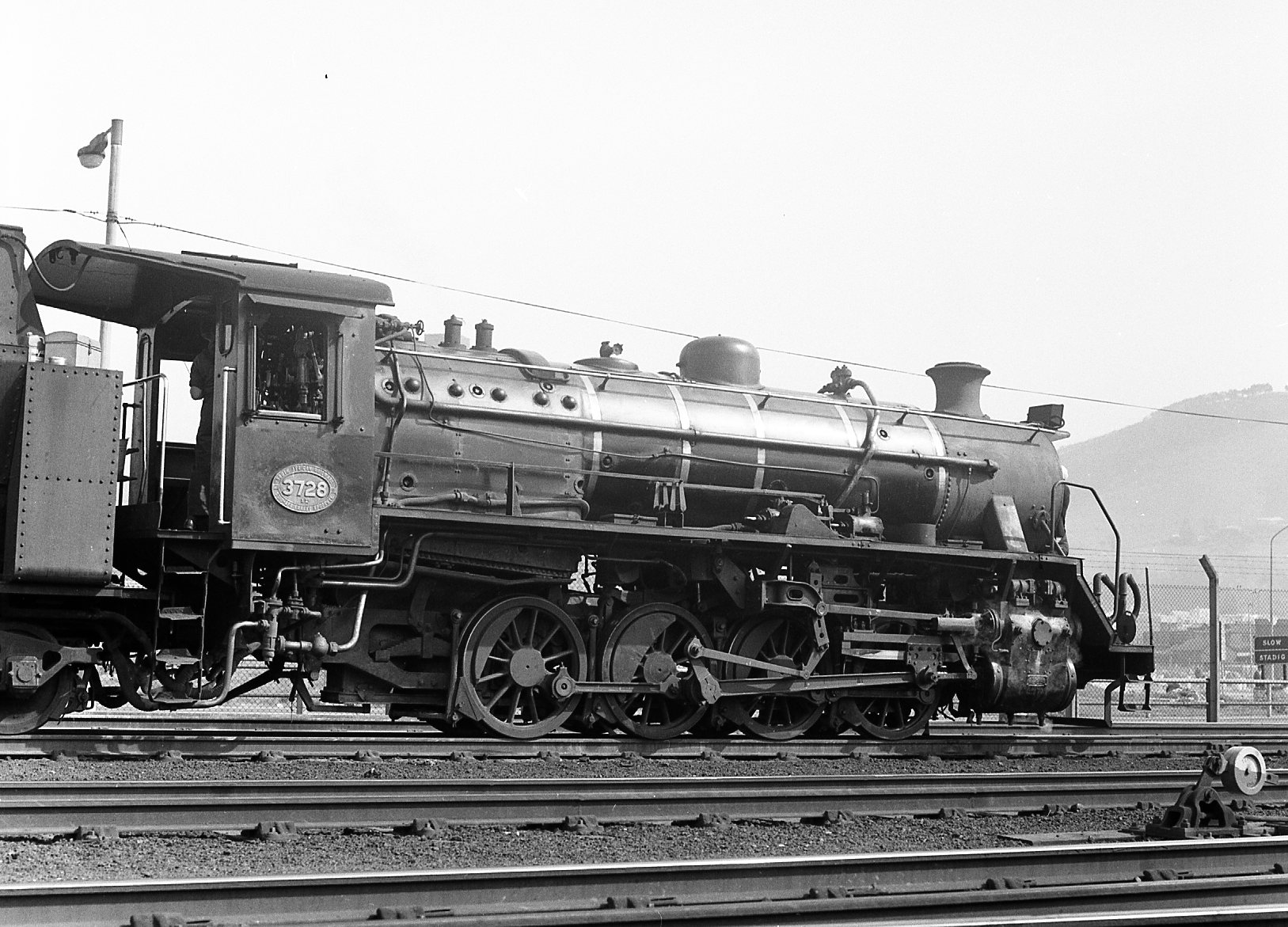
No. 3728 in Table Bay Harbour yard, August 1973

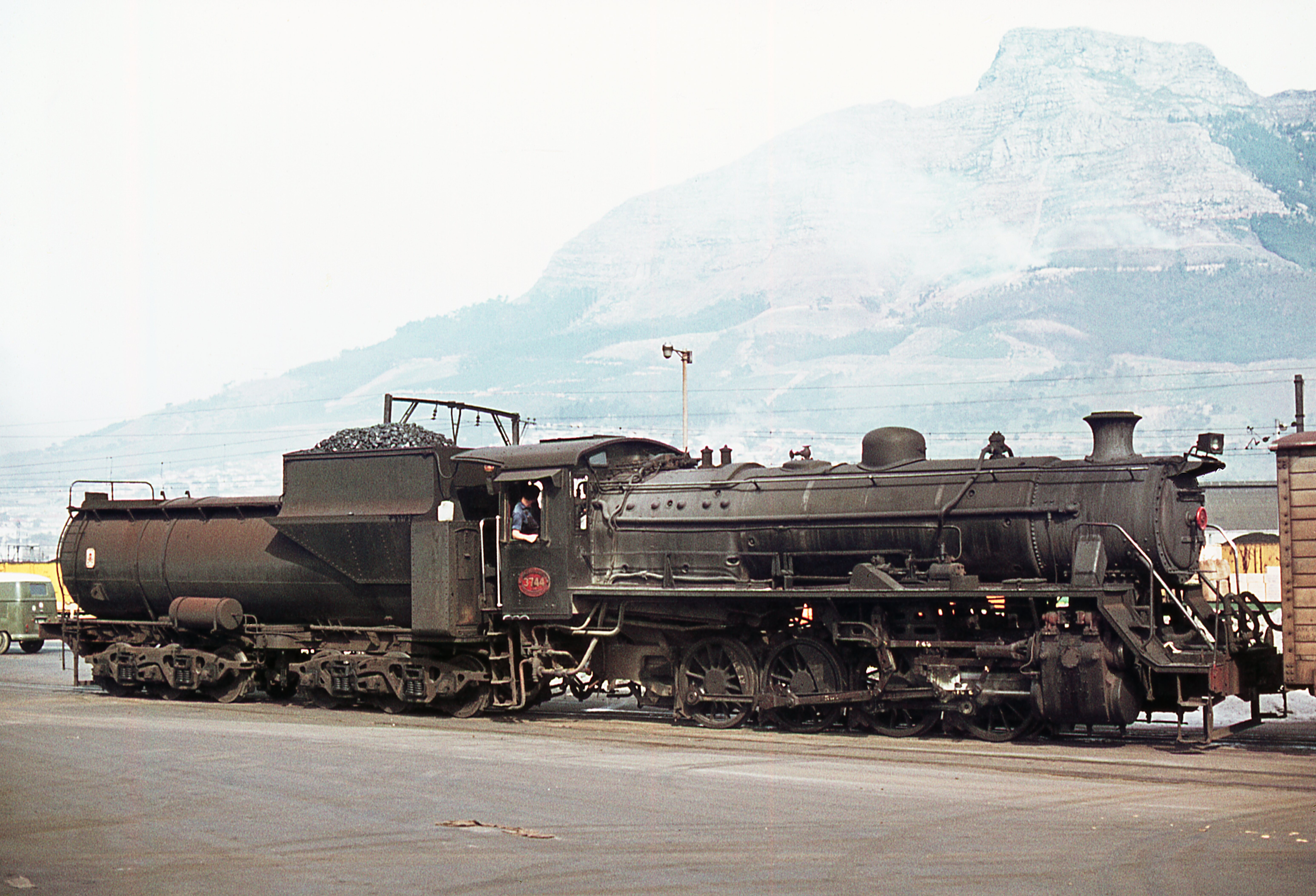
No. 3744 in Table Bay Harbour yard, August 1973

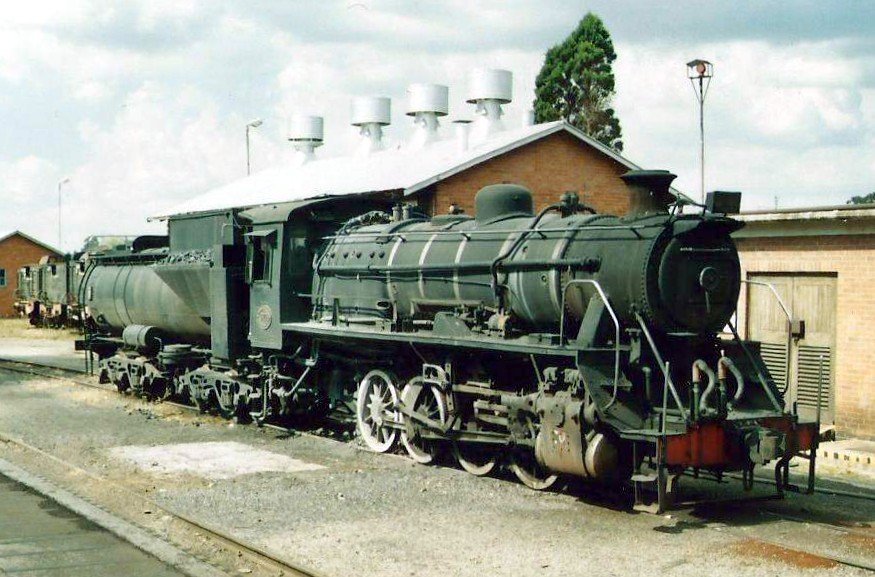
No. 3706 at Millsite, c. 1990

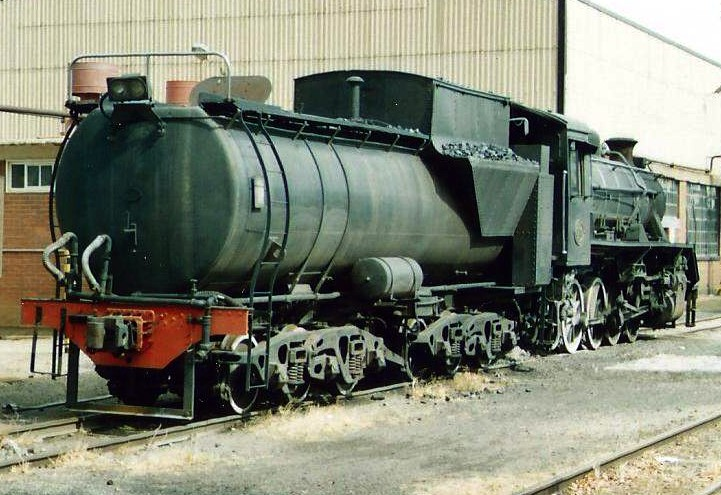
No. 3706 at Millsite, c. 1990
