= 2600 Class =

2600 Class or Class 2600 may refer to:

- Bangladesh Railway Class 2600, diesel locomotives
- CIÉ 2600 Class, Irish diesel railcars in service 1952-1987
- CP Class 2600, Portuguese electric locomotives
- GWR 2600 Class, British steam locomotives in service 1900-1949
- IE 2600 Class, Irish diesel railcars in service since 1993
- Illinois Central 2600 Class, steam locomotives
- NS Class 2600, Dutch electric multiple units
- Queensland Railways 2600 class, Australian manufactured diesel-electric locomotives based on General Electric running gear in service since 1983-1984 and retired or exported by 2011-2012
