= South African Class 36-200 =

Type of diesel-electric locomotive

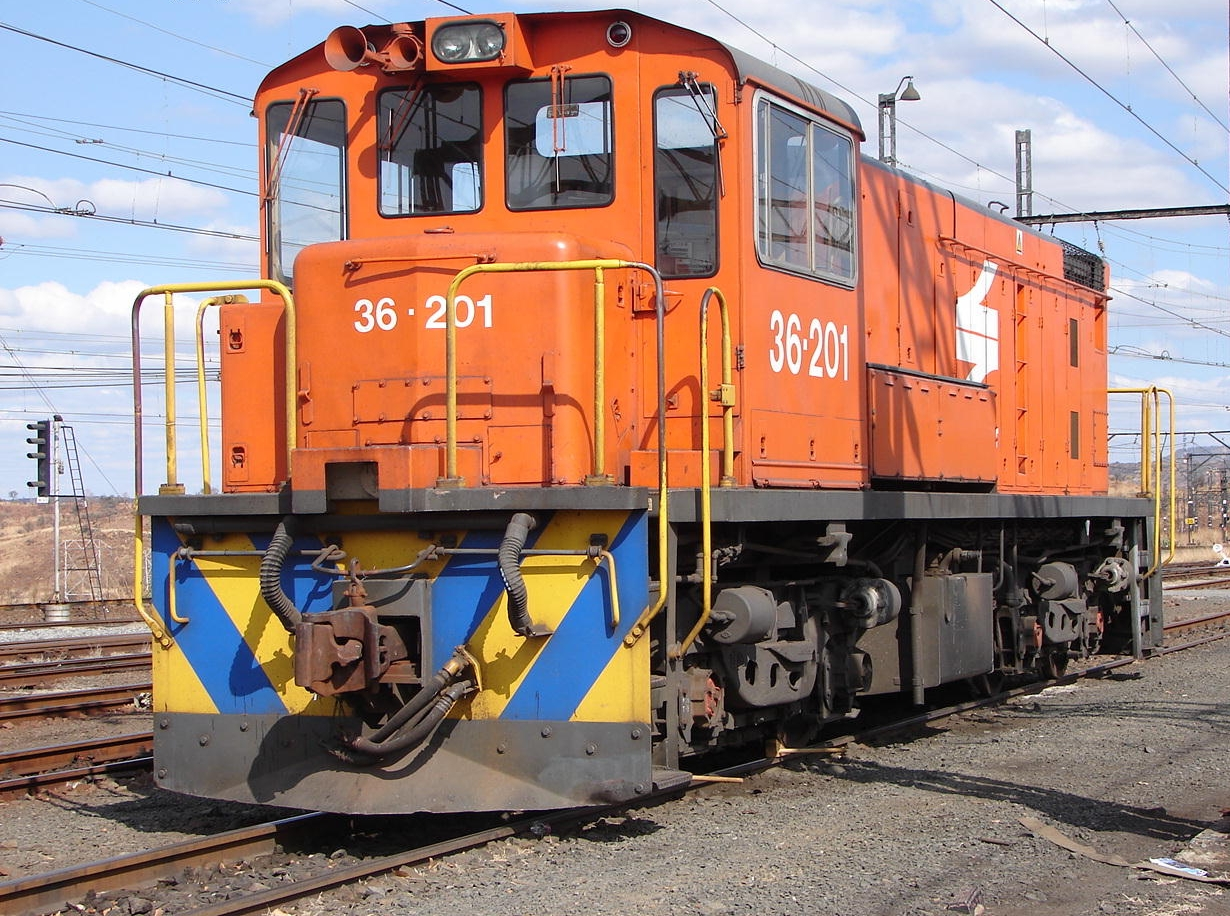
- No. 36-201 at Ladysmith, 5 August 2007
Type and origin
- Power type: Diesel-electric
- Designer: General Motors Electro-Motive Division
- Builder: General Motors South Africa; GM-Astarsa, Argentina
- Serial number: 115-1 to 115-50, 118-1 to 118-51, 120-1, 122-1 & 122-2, 123-1 & 123-2, 91F1AA001
- Model: GM-EMD SW1002
- Build date: 1980-1991
- Total produced: 107
Specifications
- Configuration
  - AAR: B-B
  - UIC: Bo'Bo'
  - Commonwealth: Bo-Bo
- Gauge: 3 ft 6 in (1,067 mm) Cape gauge
- Wheel diameter: 1,016 mm (40.0 in)
- Wheelbase: 9,905 mm (32 ft 6.0 in)
  - Bogie: 2,438 mm (8 ft 0 in)
- Pivot centres: 7,467 mm (24 ft 6.0 in)
- Length
  - Over couplers: 14,120 mm (46 ft 3.9 in)
- Width: 2,724 mm (8 ft 11.2 in)
- Height: 3,928 mm (12 ft 10.6 in)
- Axle load: 18,250 kg (40,230 lb)
- Adhesive weight: 73,000 kg (161,000 lb)
- Loco weight: 73,000 kg (161,000 lb) max
- Fuel type: Diesel
- Fuel capacity: 2,250 litres (490 imp gal)
- Prime mover: GM-EMD 8-645E
- RPM range: 250-900
  - RPM low idle: 250
  - RPM idle: 315
  - Maximum RPM: 900
- Engine type: 2-stroke diesel
- Aspiration: GM-EMD ROOTS 3 lobe blower
- Displacement: 10.57 litres (645.0 cu in)
- Generator: 8 pole GM-EMD D25
- Traction motors: Four EMD D29 DC 4 pole
  - Rating 1 hour: 485A
  - Continuous: 450A @ 15 km/h (9.3 mph)
- Cylinders: V8
- Gear ratio: 63:14
- MU working: 4 maximum
- Loco brake: 28-LAV-1 with vigilance control
- Train brakes: Gardner-Denver ADJV compressor/exhauster
- Air tank cap.: 850 litres (190 imp gal)
- Compressor: 0.021 m^{3}/s (0.74 cu ft/s)
- Exhauster: 0.096 m^{3}/s (3.4 cu ft/s)
- Couplers: AAR knuckle type E
Performance figures
- Maximum speed: 90 km/h (56 mph)
- Power output
  - Starting: 850 kW (1,140 hp)
  - Continuous: 755 kW (1,012 hp)
- Tractive effort
  - Starting: 176 kN (40,000 lbf) @ 25% adh.
  - Continuous: 141 kN (32,000 lbf) @ 13.92 km/h (8.65 mph)
- Factor of adh.
  - Starting: 25%
  - Continuous: 20%
- Brakeforce: 65% ratio @ 340 kPa (49 psi)
Career
- Operators: South African Railways; Columbus Stainless; Iscor; Ithala Development Finance Corp. Spoornet; Transnet Freight Rail; African Rail & Traction Services
- Class: Class 36-200
- Number in class: 107
- Numbers: SAR 36-201 to 36-301; Columbus 1 Iscor 661-45 to 661-47; ARTS 21-23; Ithala 1 & 2
- Delivered: 1980-1984 (SAR); 1984 (Columbus); 1986-1991 (Iscor); 1987 (Ithala)
- First run: 1980

The South African Railways Class 36-200 of 1980 is a diesel-electric locomotive.

Beginning in August 1980, the South African Railways placed 101 Class 36-200 General Motors Electro-Motive Division type SW1002 diesel-electric locomotives in service. In 1984, one Class 36-200 locomotive was also built for the Bophuthatswana National Development Corporation for use at the Ga-Rankuwa Industrial Estate. Three more were placed in service by Iscor in Pretoria between 1986 and 1991, and another two by the Ithala Development Finance Corporation in KwaZulu-Natal in 1987.

== Manufacturers ==
The Class 36-200 type SW1002 diesel-electric locomotive was designed for the South African Railways (SAR) by General Motors Electro-Motive Division (GM-EMD) and all but one were built by General Motors South Africa (GMSA) in Port Elizabeth. The exception was the third type SW1002 locomotive to be built for Iscor in Pretoria which was delivered from GM-Astarsa in Argentina.

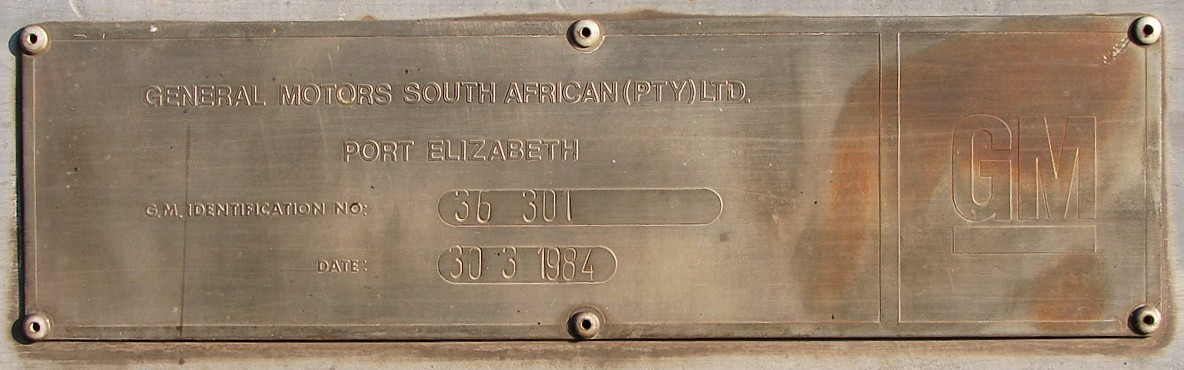
Builder’s plate on no. 36-301

The 101 locomotives for the SAR were built in two batches on two orders. The first 50 were built between 1980 and 1982 and numbered in the range from 36-201 to 36-250. Another 51 were built between 1982 and 1984 and numbered in the range from 36-251 to 36-301. It is unclear why such an odd number of locomotives were ordered.

Apart from the SAR locomotives, several were also built for industry.

- A single locomotive was built for the Bophuthatswana National Development Corporation (BNDC) in Ga-Rankuwa and delivered in 1984.
- Two locomotives, which had been ordered by Iscor in Pretoria, were delivered in 1986, numbered 661-45 and 661-46.
- Two locomotives, which had been ordered by the Ithala Development Finance Corporation (IDFC) in KwaZulu-Natal, were delivered in 1987 and numbered 1 and 2.
- The Argentinian-built locomotive was delivered to Iscor by GM-Astarsa in 1991 and numbered 661-47.

== Class 36 series ==
The Class 36 locomotive group consists of two series, the General Electric (GE) Class 36-000 and the GM-EMD Class 36-200. Both manufacturers also produced locomotives for the South African Classes 33, 34 and 35.

== Service ==
=== South African Railways ===
Class 36-200 locomotives are general purpose locomotives, equipped with two-station controls for bi-directional operation, which are used mainly for yard shunting and pickup work to service industrial customers. When placed in service, the SAR locomotives were initially distributed for service between the Western and Eastern Cape and the Eastern Transvaal Lowveld, but the Cape locomotives were later relocated to Natal, Gauteng, the North West Province and Limpopo.

On the Natal South Coast they were at one time employed in road work between Durban and Port Shepstone, working in pairs or in trios.

=== Industry ===
The three Iscor locomotives were later hired out to African Rail & Traction Services (ARTS), based in a workshop at the Iscor Pretoria works, and renumbered in the range from 21 to 23. ARTS has a fleet of about twenty locomotives which are used on hire contracts. By early 2002, ARTS locomotives were employed at the Rustenburg Platinum Mine in the North West Province, at Iscor in Pretoria where it took over the entire railway operation, and at the Richards Bay Coal Terminal in KwaZulu-Natal.

The BNDC locomotive did not remain in service in Bophuthatwana very long before it went to Columbus Stainless in Middelburg, Transvaal.

The IDFC locomotives were later sold to Sheltam, where they were numbered 24 and 25 and later renumbered to 1003 and 1004.

== Works numbers ==
Apart from on their works plates, the builder’s works number was also stamped on their frames, but instead of the builder’s serial they used the last three digits of the unit’s number. No. 36-209 was therefore stamped 115-209 instead of 115-9. Some of these numbers were reverse stamped, for example as 234-115. Units so noted were numbers 234, 235, 240, 241 and 245-115 and numbers 251, 257 and 270-118.

The Class 36-200 builder’s works numbers, dates or years built and the distribution of the non-SAR industrial locomotives are listed in the table. The dates, as shown, were recorded off the respective locomotive works plates.

Class 36-200, GM-EMD type SW1002
Loco no.	Builder	Date	Works no.	Hired or sold to	New no.
36-201	GMSA	1980	115-1		
36-202	GMSA	1980	115-2 (115-202)		
36-203	GMSA	1980	115-3		
36-204	GMSA	1980	115-4		
36-205	GMSA	30 September 1980	115-5		
36-206	GMSA	1980	115-6		
36-207	GMSA	1980	115-7		
36-208	GMSA	1980	115-8		
36-209	GMSA	13 November 1980	115-9 (115-209)		
36-210	GMSA	1980	115-10		
36-211	GMSA	28 November 1980	115-11		
36-212	GMSA	26 November 1980	115-12		
36-213	GMSA	11 December 1980	115-13		
36-214	GMSA	28 January 1981	115-14		
36-215	GMSA	1981	115-15		
36-216	GMSA	1981	115-16		
36-217	GMSA	1981	115-17		
36-218	GMSA	2 March 1981	115-18		
36-219	GMSA	2 March 1981	115-19		
36-220	GMSA	16 March 1981	115-20		
36-221	GMSA	8 April 1981	115-21		
36-222	GMSA	28 March 1981	115-22		
36-223	GMSA	1981	115-23		
36-224	GMSA	1981	115-24		
36-225	GMSA	22 May 1981	115-25		
36-226	GMSA	25 May 1981	115-26		
36-227	GMSA	1981	115-27		
36-228	GMSA	30 June 1981	115-28		
36-229	GMSA	30 June 1981	115-29		
36-230	GMSA	20 July 1981	115-30		
36-231	GMSA	31 July 1981	115-31		
36-232	GMSA	31 August 1981	115-32		
36-233	GMSA	11 September 1981	115-33		
36-234	GMSA	21 September 1981	115-34 (234-115)		
36-235	GMSA	23 September 1981	115-35 (235-115)		
36-236	GMSA	5 October 1981	115-36		
36-237	GMSA	1981	115-37		
36-238	GMSA	15 October 1981	115-38		
36-239	GMSA	27 October 1981	115-39		
36-240	GMSA	1981	115-40 (240-115)		
36-241	GMSA	10 November 1981	115-41 (241-115)		
36-242	GMSA	18 November 1981	115-42		
36-243	GMSA	30 November 1981	115-43		
36-244	GMSA	10 December 1981	115-44		
36-245	GMSA	22 December 1981	115-45 (245-115)		
36-246	GMSA	21 January 1982	115-46		
36-247	GMSA	1982	115-47		
36-248	GMSA	1982	115-48		
36-249	GMSA	1982	115-49		
36-250	GMSA	1982	115-50		
36-251	GMSA	22 September 1982	118-1 (251-118)		
36-252	GMSA	1982-83	118-2		
36-253	GMSA	1982-83	118-3		
36-254	GMSA	1982-83	118-4		
36-255	GMSA	1982-83	118-5		
36-256	GMSA	1982-83	118-6		
36-257	GMSA	1982-83	118-7 (257-118)		
36-258	GMSA	1982-83	118-8		
36-259	GMSA	1982-83	118-9		
36-260	GMSA	1982-83	118-10		
36-261	GMSA	1982-83	118-11		
36-262	GMSA	1982-83	118-12		
36-263	GMSA	1982-83	118-13		
36-264	GMSA	1982-83	118-14		
36-265	GMSA	1982-83	118-15		
36-266	GMSA	1982-83	118-16		
36-267	GMSA	1982-83	118-17		
36-268	GMSA	1982-83	118-18		
36-269	GMSA	1982-83	118-19		
36-270	GMSA	18 April 1983	118-20 (270-118)		
36-271	GMSA	25 April 1983	118-21		
36-272	GMSA	1983-84	118-22		
36-273	GMSA	1983-84	118-23		
36-274	GMSA	1983-84	118-24		
36-275	GMSA	1983-84	118-25		
36-276	GMSA	1983-84	118-26		
36-277	GMSA	1983-84	118-27		
36-278	GMSA	1983-84	118-28		
36-279	GMSA	1983-84	118-29		
36-280	GMSA	1983-84	118-30		
36-281	GMSA	1983-84	118-31		
36-282	GMSA	1983-84	118-32		
36-283	GMSA	1983-84	118-33		
36-284	GMSA	1983-84	118-34		
36-285	GMSA	1983-84	118-35		
36-286	GMSA	1983-84	118-36		
36-287	GMSA	1983-84	118-37		
36-288	GMSA	1983-84	118-38		
36-289	GMSA	28 October 1983	118-39 (118-289)		
36-290	GMSA	1983-84	118-40		
36-291	GMSA	1983-84	118-41		
36-292	GMSA	1983-84	118-42		
36-293	GMSA	1983-84	118-43		
36-294	GMSA	1983-84	118-44		
36-295	GMSA	1983-84	118-45		
36-296	GMSA	1983-84	118-46		
36-297	GMSA	14 February 1984	118-47		
36-298	GMSA	1984	118-48		
36-299	GMSA	1984	118-49		
36-300	GMSA	1984	118-50		
36-301	GMSA	30 March 1984	118-51		
BNDC	GMSA	1984	120-1	Columbus	1
661-45	GMSA	1986	122-1	ARTS	21
661-46	GMSA	1986	122-2	ARTS	22
661-47	Astarsa	1991	91F1AA001	ARTS	23
IDFC 1	GMSA	1987	123-1	Sheltam	1003
IDFC 2	GMSA	1987	123-2	Sheltam	1004

== Liveries ==
All the Class 36-200 locomotives were delivered in the SAR Gulf Red livery with signal red buffer beams, yellow side stripes on the long hood sides and a yellow V on each end. In the 1990s many of them began to be repainted in the Spoornet orange livery with a yellow and blue chevron pattern on the buffer beams. Several later received the Spoornet maroon livery. In the 2000s at least one was repainted in the Spoornet blue livery with outline numbers on the sides. After 2008 in the Transnet Freight Rail (TFR) era, some began to appear in the TFR red, green and yellow livery.

== Illustration ==
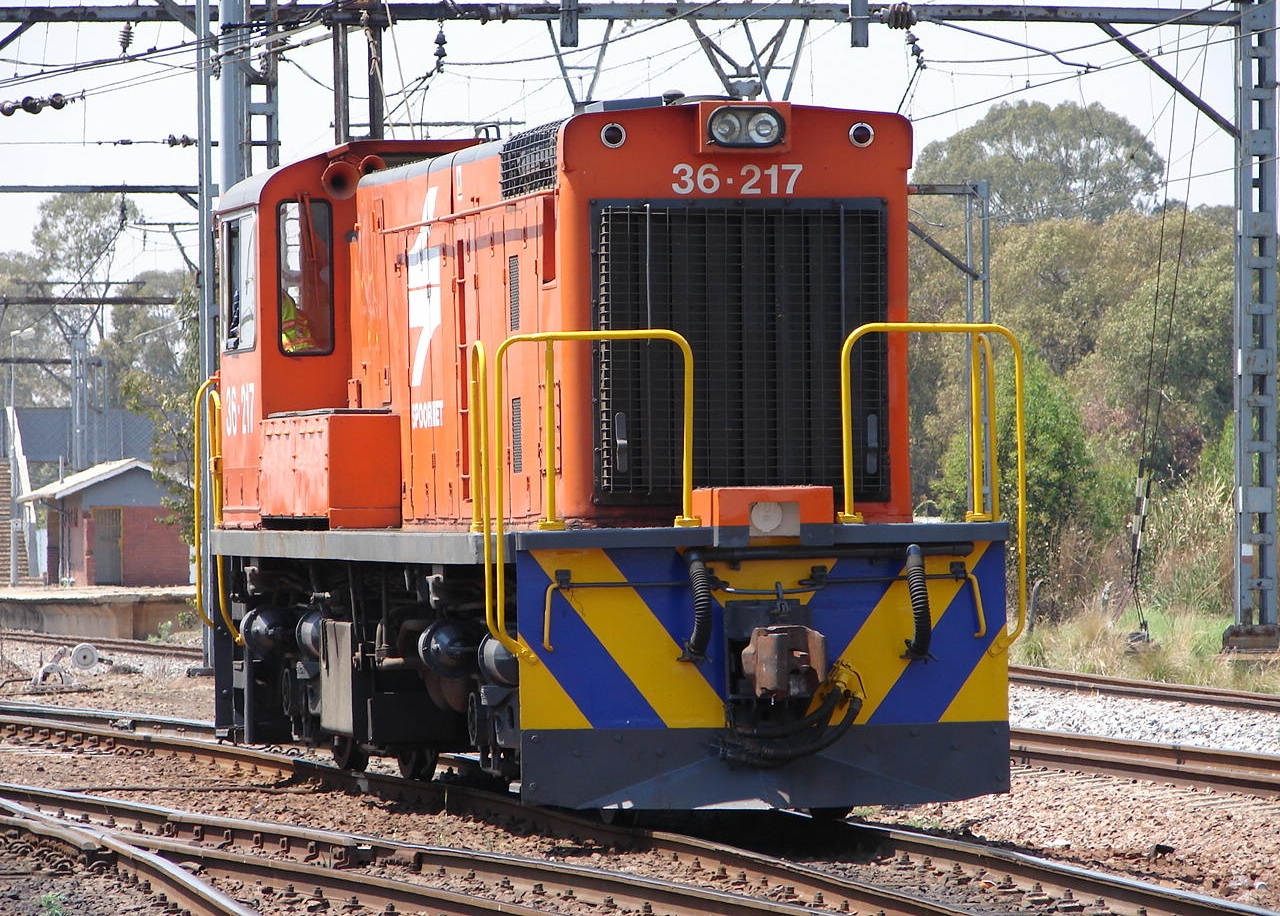
No. 36-217 in Spoornet orange livery at Capital Park, Pretoria, 29 September 2006

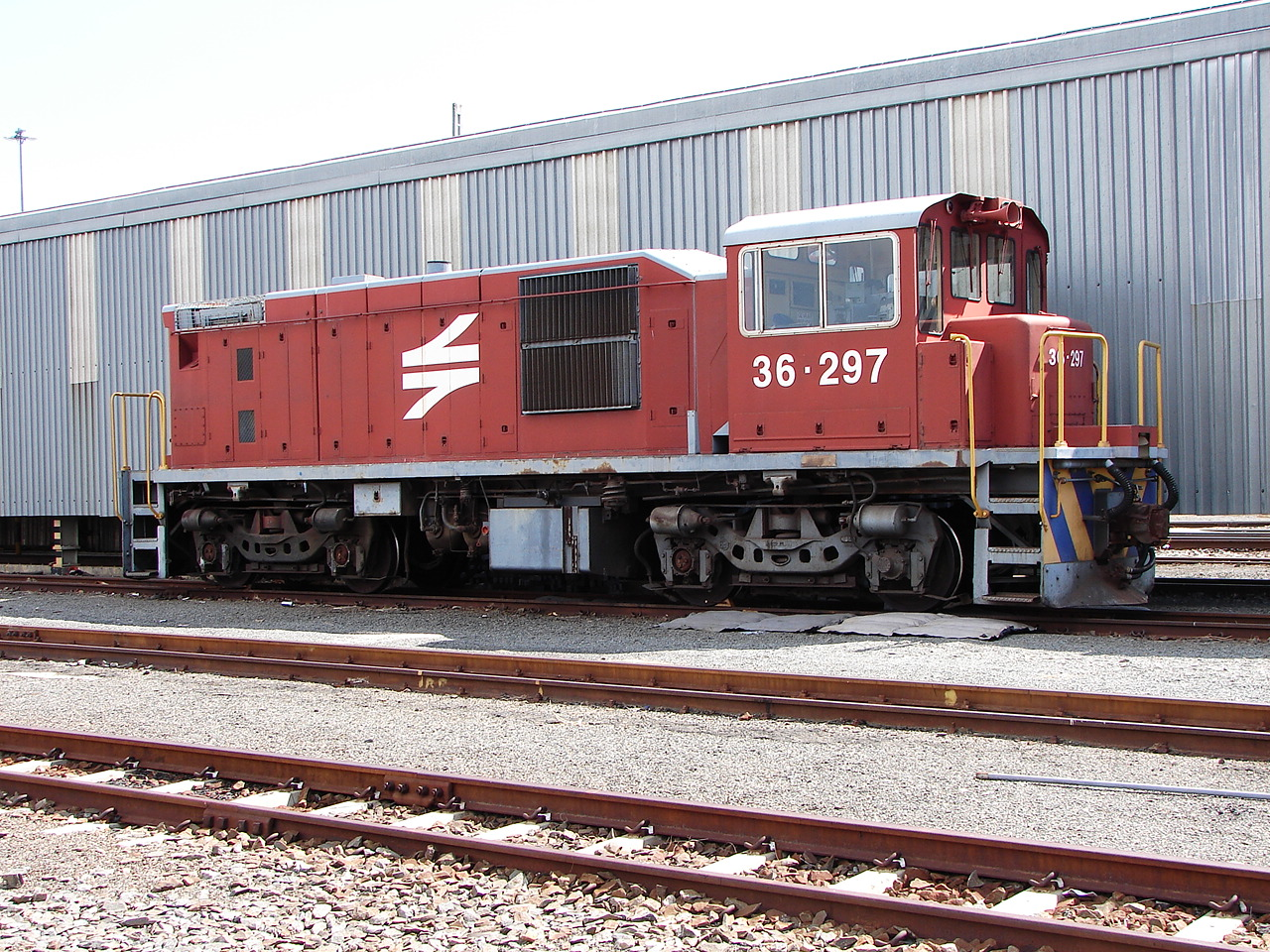
No. 36-297 in Spoornet maroon livery at Beaufort West, 27 March 2013

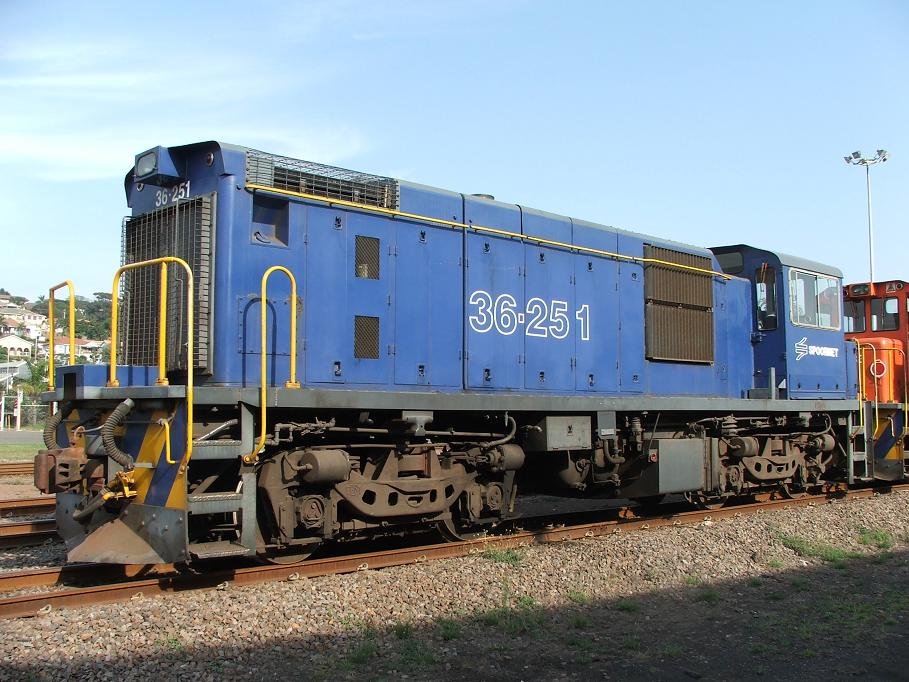
No. 36-251 in Spoornet blue and outline numbers at Wentworth, 26 May 2010

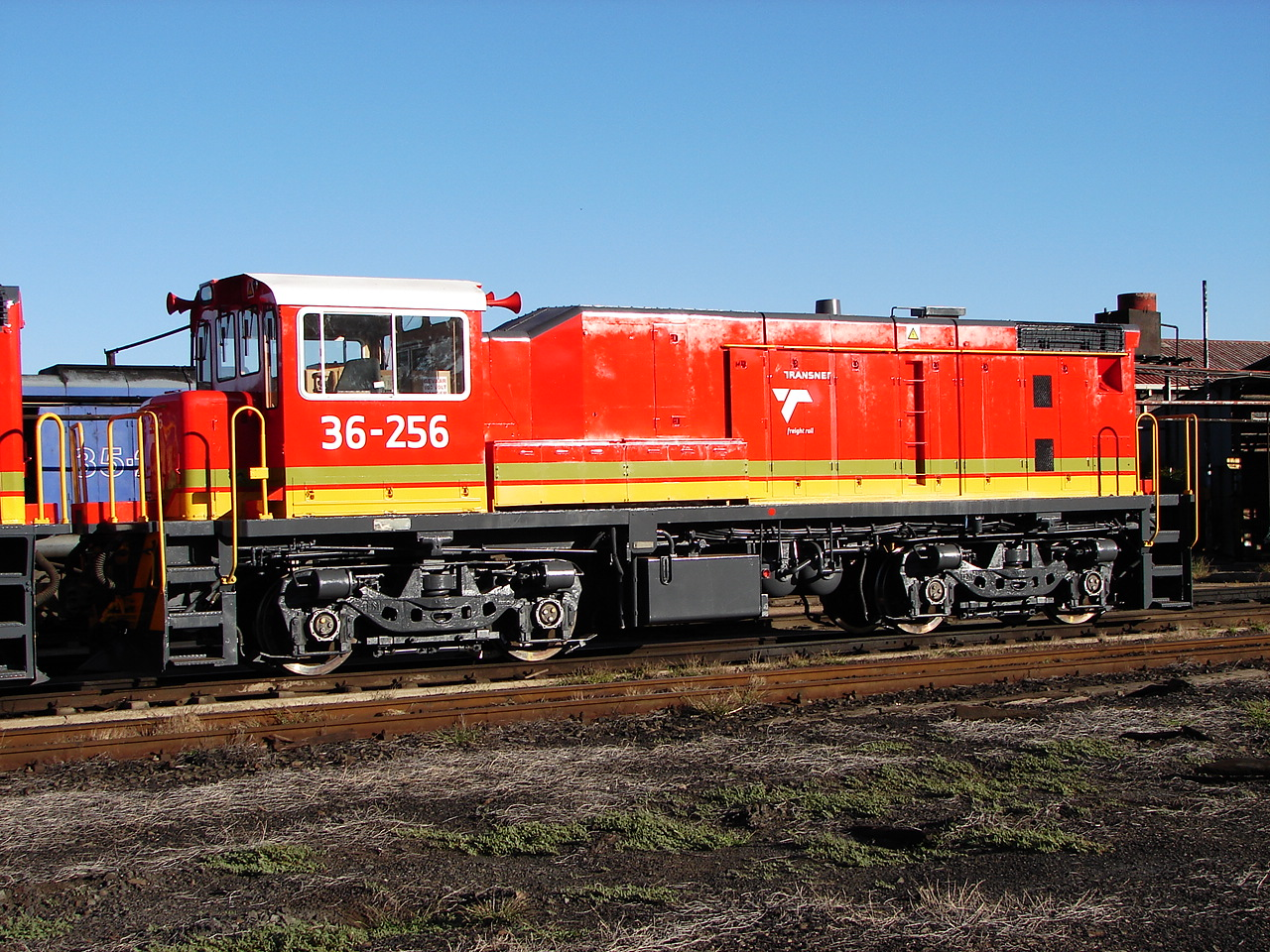
No. 36-256 in Transnet Freight Rail livery at Bloemfontein Depot, 29 April 2013
