= Queensland Railways 2600 class =

Class of Australian diesel-electric locomotives

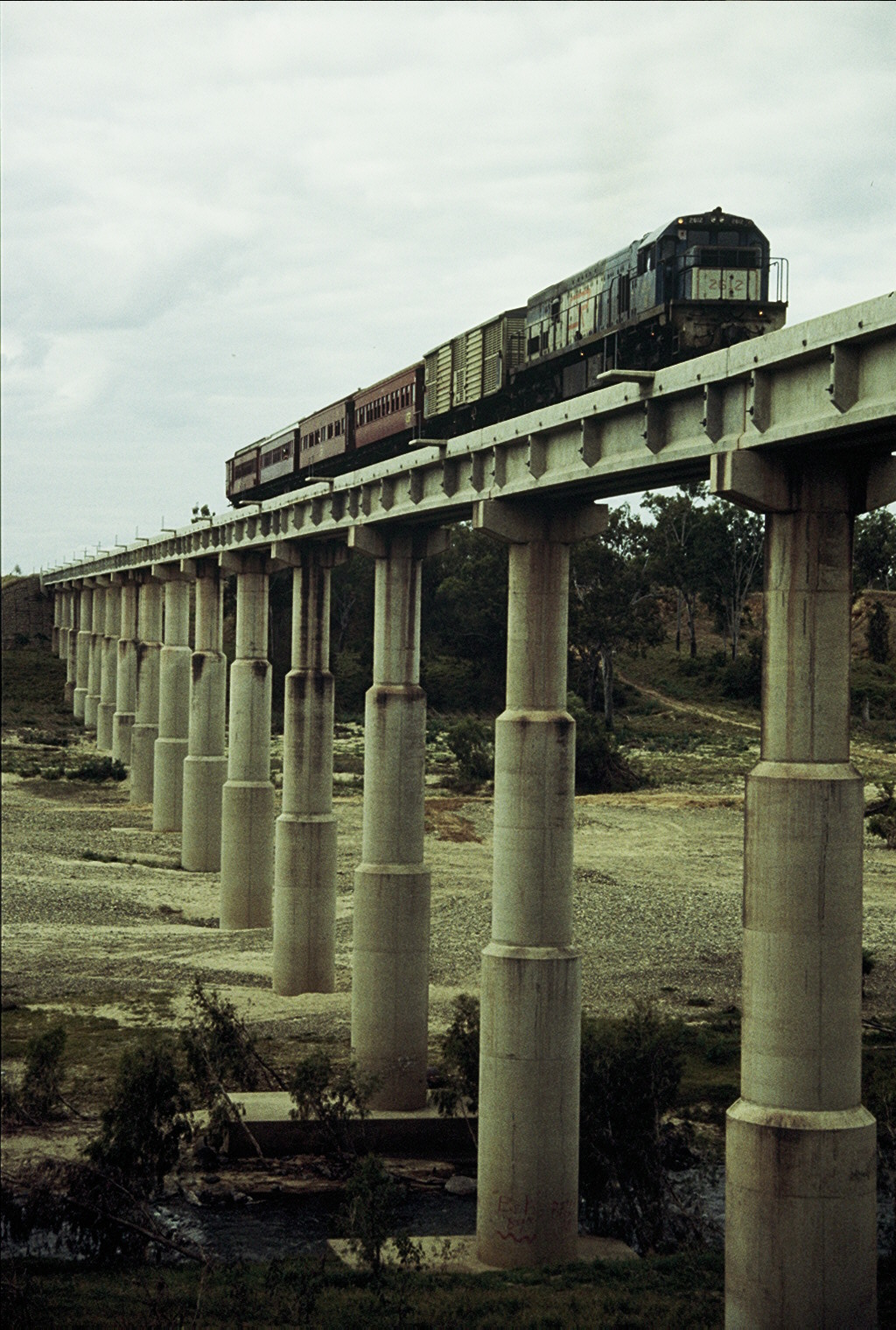
- 2612 hauls a special train over the Bowen River bridge on the GAP line in September 1989
Type and origin
- Power type: Diesel-electric
- Builder: A Goninan & Co, Townsville
- Serial number: 58–70
- Model: General Electric U22C
- Build date: 1983–1984
- Total produced: 13
- Rebuilder: A Goninan & Co, Townsville
- Rebuild date: 2000–2001
- Number rebuilt: 13
Specifications
- Configuration
  - UIC: Co-Co
- Gauge: 1,067 mm (3 ft 6 in)
- Length: 18.89 m (62 ft 0 in)
- Loco weight: 97.6 t (96.1 long tons; 107.6 short tons)
- Fuel type: Diesel
- Prime mover: GE 7FDL-12
- Generator: GE GT581
- Traction motors: GE 761
Performance figures
- Maximum speed: 80 km/h (50 mph)
- Power output: 1,640 kW (2,200 hp) (net)
Career
- Operators: Queensland Rail
- Number in class: 13
- Numbers: 2600–2612
- First run: November 1983
- Current owner: African Rail & Traction Services RRL Grindrod
- Disposition: 13 exported

The 2600 class were a class of diesel locomotive built by A Goninan & Co, Townsville for Queensland Rail in 1983–1984.

== History ==
The 2600 class entered service on the McNaughton and Newlands lines. They were based at Pring depot near Bowen, and were a standard General Electric export model (similar locomotives were also used in Brazil, Nigeria and Tunisia). Between July 2000 and May 2001, all 13 were rebuilt by A Goninan & Co with cab extensions (the stock GE cab was replaced with the standard Queensland Rail "maxicab"). Their weight increased to 109.3 tonnes (107.6 long tons; 120.5 short tons). They were then placed in service on the Mount Isa line.

All were withdrawn in 2011 and in May 2012 exported to South Africa with seven going to African Rail & Traction Services and six to RRL Grindrod.
