= Queensland Railways 2150 class =

Australian diesel-electric locomotives

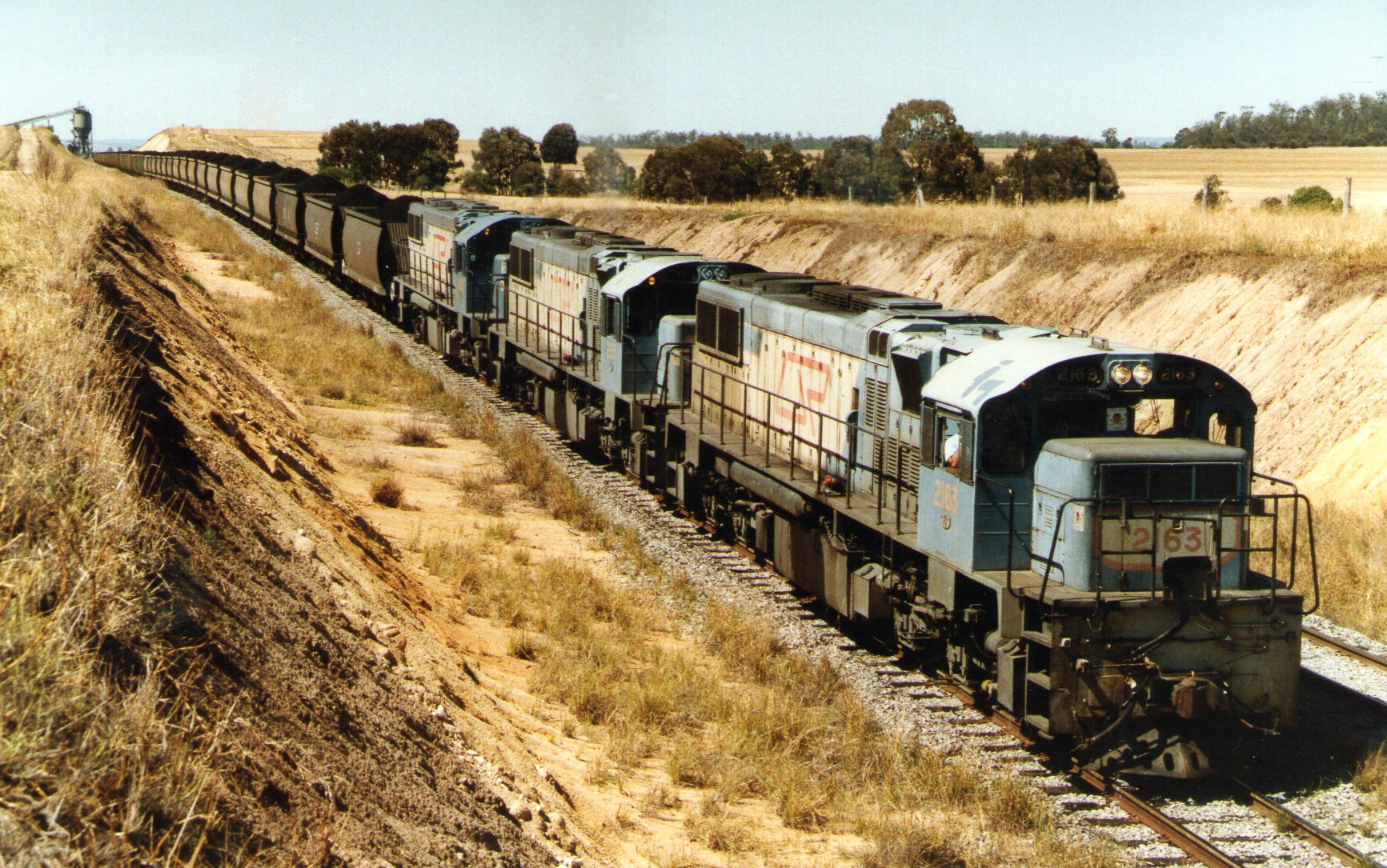
- 2163 leads a coal train away from Boundary Hill Mine on the Moura line in 1991
Type and origin
- Power type: Diesel-electric
- Builder: Clyde Engineering, Eagle Farm
- Serial number: 79-901 to 79-914
- Model: Electro-Motive Diesel GL26AC
- Build date: 1978-1979
- Total produced: 14
Specifications
- Configuration
  - UIC: Co-Co
- Gauge: 1,067 mm (3 ft 6 in)
- Length: 18.04 m (59 ft 2 in)
- Loco weight: 97.5 t (96.0 long tons; 107.5 short tons)
- Fuel type: Diesel
- Fuel capacity: 7,273 L (1,600 imp gal; 1,921 US gal)
- Prime mover: Electro-Motive Diesel 645E
- Engine type: V16 Diesel engine
- Aspiration: Roots blower
- Generator: Electro-Motive Diesel AR10-D14
- Traction motors: Electro-Motive Diesel D29
- Cylinders: 16
- Loco brake: Dynamic
Performance figures
- Maximum speed: 80 km/h (50 mph)
- Power output: 1,491 kW (1,999 hp)
Career
- Operators: Queensland Railways
- Number in class: 14
- Numbers: 2150–2163
- First run: December 1978
- Current owner: Aurizon, TasRail, Queensland Rail
- Disposition: 1 in service, 2 stored, 11 exported

The 2150 class was a class of diesel locomotives built by Clyde Engineering, Eagle Farm for Queensland Railways in 1978–1979.

== History ==
The 2150 class were an evolution of the 2130 class. They differed by having a modular control system and the sandboxes relocated from the nose to the bogies. All were transferred to QR National in 2004, which became Aurizon in 2012.

In 2011, four were sold to TasRail entering service as the 2050 class. In August 2013, seven were exported to South Africa. Three were sold by Aurizon back to Queensland Rail in 2014.
