= South African Class 36-000 =

Class of South African diesel locomotives

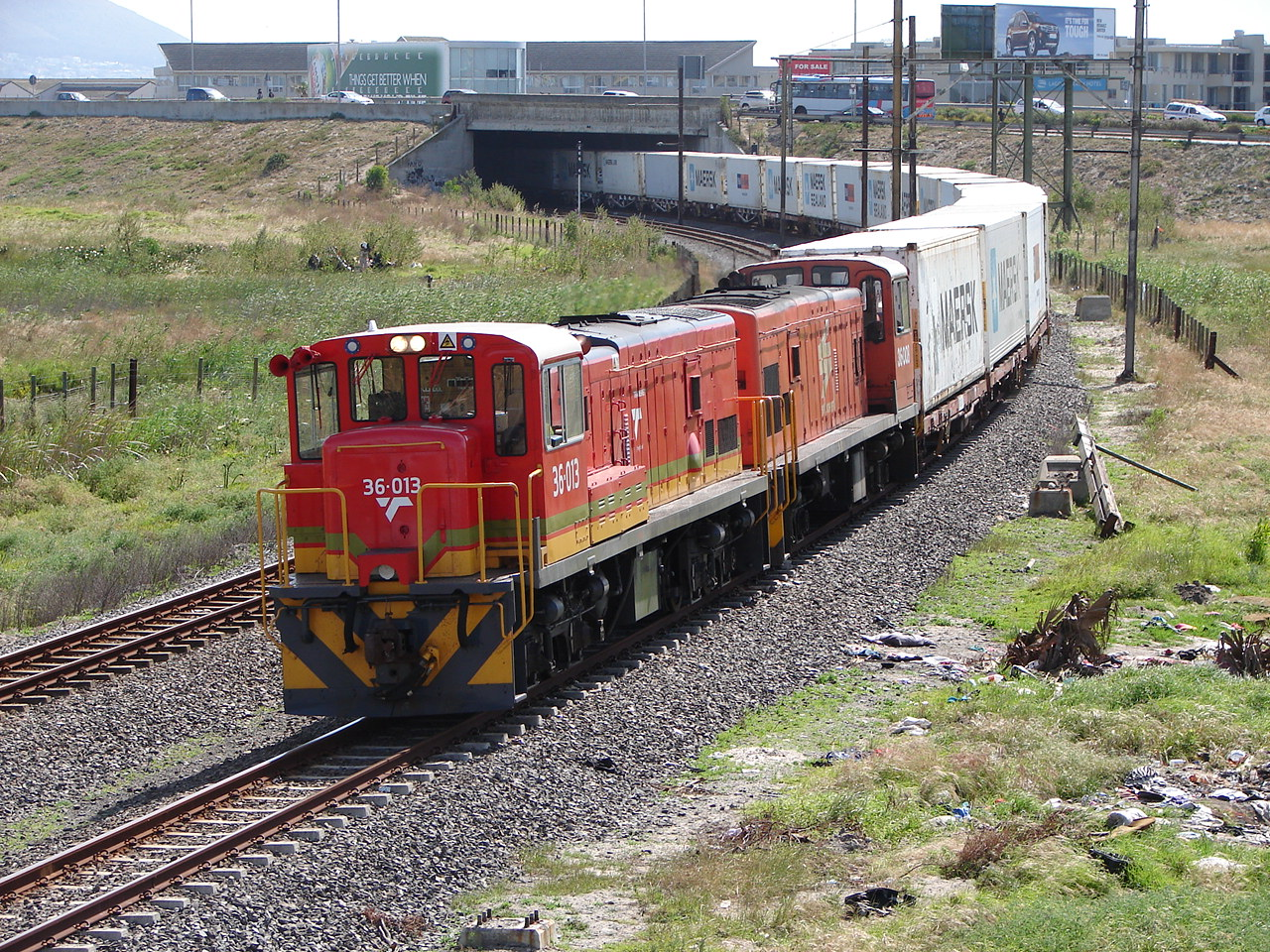
- No. 36-013 at Rugby, Cape Town, 4 November 2013
Type and origin
- Power type: Diesel-electric
- Designer: General Electric
- Builder: SA GE-DL Locomotive Group
- Serial number: 40420-40519, 41380-41399, 40586-40589
- Model: GE SG10B
- Build date: 1975–1981
- Total produced: 124
Specifications
- Configuration
  - AAR: B-B
  - UIC: Bo'Bo'
  - Commonwealth: Bo-Bo
- Gauge: 3 ft 6 in (1,067 mm) Cape gauge
- Wheel diameter: 915 mm (36.0 in)
- Wheelbase: 10,782 mm (35 ft 4.5 in)
  - Bogie: 2,082 mm (6 ft 10.0 in)
- Pivot centres: 8,700 mm (28 ft 6.5 in)
- Length
  - Over couplers: 15,151 mm (49 ft 8.5 in)
- Width: 2,727 mm (8 ft 11.4 in)
- Height: 3,924 mm (12 ft 10.5 in)
- Axle load: 18,250 kg (40,230 lb)
- Adhesive weight: 73,000 kg (161,000 lb)
- Loco weight: 73,000 kg (161,000 lb) max
- Fuel type: Diesel
- Fuel capacity: 2,200 litres (480 imp gal)
- Prime mover: GE 7FDL-8
- RPM range: 385–1,050
  - RPM low idle: 385
  - RPM idle: 450
  - Maximum RPM: 1,050
- Engine type: 4-stroke diesel
- Aspiration: GE 1408 turbocharger
- Generator: 10 pole GE 5GT-581C15
- Traction motors: Four GE 5GE-761-A13 DC 4 pole
  - Rating 1 hour: 665A
  - Continuous: 655A @ 15 km/h (9.3 mph)
- Cylinders: V8
- Gear ratio: 92:19
- MU working: 4 maximum
- Loco brake: 28-LAV-1 with vigilance control
- Train brakes: Westinghouse 6CDX4UC compressor/exhauster
- Air tank cap.: 800 litres (180 imp gal)
- Compressor: 0.033 m^{3}/s (1.2 cu ft/s)
- Exhauster: 0.130 m^{3}/s (4.6 cu ft/s)
- Couplers: AAR knuckle type E
Performance figures
- Maximum speed: 100 km/h (62 mph)
- Power output
  - Starting: 875 kW (1,173 hp)
  - Continuous: 800 kW (1,100 hp)
- Tractive effort
  - Starting: 176 kN (40,000 lbf) @ 25% adh.
  - Continuous: 141 kN (32,000 lbf) @ 14 km/h (8.7 mph)
- Factor of adh.
  - Starting: 25%
  - Continuous: 20%
- Brakeforce: 70% ratio @ 345 kPa (50.0 psi)
Career
- Operators: South African Railways; Spoornet; Transnet Freight Rail; PRASA
- Class: Class 36-000
- Number in class: 124
- Numbers: 36-001 to 36-124
- Delivered: 1975–1981
- First run: 1975

The South African Railways Class 36-000 is a diesel-electric locomotive.

Between June 1975 and 1981, the South African Railways placed 124 Class 36-000 General Electric type SG10B diesel-electric locomotives in service.

== Manufacturer ==
The Class 36-000 type GE SG10B diesel-electric locomotive was designed by General Electric (GE) and built for the South African Railways (SAR) in three batches by the South African General Electric-Dorman Long Locomotive Group (SA GE-DL, later Dorbyl). The first one hundred locomotives were delivered between June 1975 and September 1978, numbered in the range from 36-001 to 36-100. These were followed in 1981 by two batches of twenty and four locomotives respectively, numbered in the ranges from 36-101 to 36-120 and 36-121 to 36-124 respectively.

== Class 36 series ==
The Class 36 locomotive family consists of two series, the GE type SG10B Class 36-000 and the General Motors Electro-Motive Division (GM-EMD) type SW1002 Class 36-200. Both manufacturers also produced locomotives for the South African Classes 33, 34 and 35.

== Characteristics ==
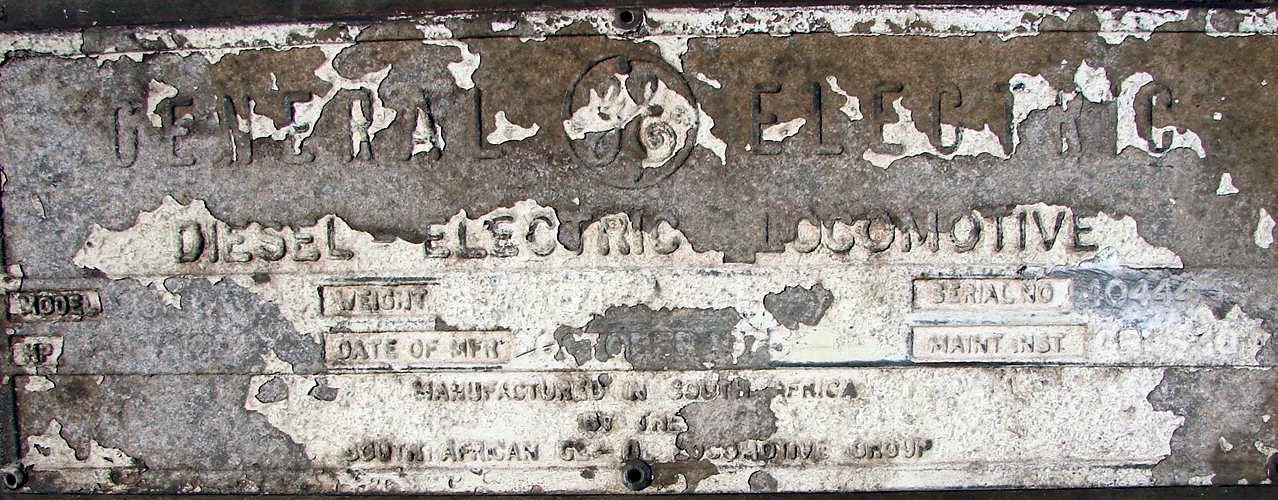
Works plate on no. 36-025

The Class 36-000 is a general purpose locomotive which is equipped with two station controls for bi-directional operation. It is used mainly for yard shunting and pickup work to service industrial customers.

Their large cab windows were designed to afford the crew the maximum all-round field of vision, but in South African summer months the sun can cause much discomfort in the cab. It is not unusual to find a locomotive on yard work with the sun-side windows covered with newspaper taped onto the insides. A few Class 36-000 locomotives have been observed at Vereeniging and at Port Elizabeth with home depot-applied modifications to their cab roofs in the form of sheetmetal roof extensions to the front and rear to serve as sun-shades.

== Service ==
When placed in service, they were initially distributed for service between Natal and the Western Transvaal, but they were later exchanged with Class 36-200 units from the Western and Eastern Cape, the Free State and Western Transvaal where they are still serving.

== Works numbers ==
The Class 36-000 builder's works numbers and years built are shown in the table.

Class 36-000, GE type SG10B
Loco no.	Works no.	Year built
36-001	40420	1975
36-002	40421	1975
36-003	40422	1975
36-004	40423	1975
36-005	40424	1975
36-006	40425	1975
36-007	40426	1975
36-008	40427	1975
36-009	40428	1975
36-010	40429	1975
36-011	40430	1975
36-012	40431	1975
36-013	40432	1975
36-014	40433	1975
36-015	40434	1975
36-016	40435	1975
36-017	40436	1975
36-018	40437	1975
36-019	40438	1975
36-020	40439	1975
36-021	40440	1975
36-022	40441	1975
36-023	40442	1975
36-024	40443	1975
36-025	40444	1975
36-026	40445	1975–78
36-027	40446	1975–78
36-028	40447	1975–78
36-029	40448	1975–78
36-030	40449	1975–78
36-031	40450	1975–78
36-032	40451	1975–78
36-033	40452	1975–78
36-034	40453	1975–78
36-035	40454	1975–78
36-036	40455	1975–78
36-037	40456	1975–78
36-038	40457	1975–78
36-039	40458	1975–78
36-040	40459	1975–78
36-041	40460	1975–78
36-042	40461	1975–78
36-043	40462	1975–78
36-044	40463	1975–78
36-045	40464	1975–78
36-046	40465	1975–78
36-047	40466	1975–78
36-048	40467	1975–78
36-049	40468	1975–78
36-050	40469	1975–78
36-051	40470	1975–78
36-052	40471	1975–78
36-053	40472	1975–78
36-054	40473	1975–78
36-055	40474	1975–78
36-056	40475	1975–78
36-057	40476	1975–78
36-058	40477	1975–78
36-059	40478	1975–78
36-060	40479	1975–78
36-061	40480	1975–78
36-062	40481	1975–78
36-063	40482	1975–78
36-064	40483	1975–78
36-065	40484	1975–78
36-066	40485	1975–78
36-067	40486	1975–78
36-068	40487	1975–78
36-069	40488	1975–78
36-070	40489	1975–78
36-071	40490	1975–78
36-072	40491	1975–78
36-073	40492	1975–78
36-074	40493	1975–78
36-075	40494	1975–78
36-076	40495	1975–78
36-077	40496	1975–78
36-078	40497	1975–78
36-079	40498	1975–78
36-080	40499	1975–78
36-081	40500	1975–78
36-082	40501	1975–78
36-083	40502	1975–78
36-084	40503	1975–78
36-085	40504	1975–78
36-086	40505	1975–78
36-087	40506	1975–78
36-088	40507	1975–78
36-089	40508	1975–78
36-090	40509	1975–78
36-091	40510	1975–78
36-092	40511	1975–78
36-093	40512	1975–78
36-094	40513	1975–78
36-095	40514	1975–78
36-096	40515	1975–78
36-097	40516	1975–78
36-098	40517	1975–78
36-099	40518	1975–78
36-100	40519	1975–78
36-101	41380	1981
36-102	41381	1981
36-103	41382	1981
36-104	41383	1981
36-105	41384	1981
36-106	41385	1981
36-107	41386	1981
36-108	41387	1981
36-109	41388	1981
36-110	41389	1981
36-111	41390	1981
36-112	41391	1981
36-113	41392	1981
36-114	41393	1981
36-115	41394	1981
36-116	41395	1981
36-117	41396	1981
36-118	41397	1981
36-119	41398	1981
36-120	41399	1981
36-121	40586	1981
36-122	40587	1981
36-123	40588	1981
36-124	40589	1981

== Liveries ==
The Class 36-000 were all delivered in the SAR Gulf Red livery with signal red buffer beams, yellow side stripes on the long hood sides and a yellow V on each end. In the 1990s many of the units began to be repainted in the Spoornet orange livery with a yellow and blue chevron pattern on the buffer beams. From 2007 many were repainted in the Spoornet blue livery with outline numbers on the long hood sides. After 2008 in the Transnet Freight Rail (TFR) and Passenger Rail Agency of South Africa (PRASA) era, many were repainted in the TFR red, green and yellow livery and at least one was repainted in the PRASA blue livery.

== Class 91-000 ==
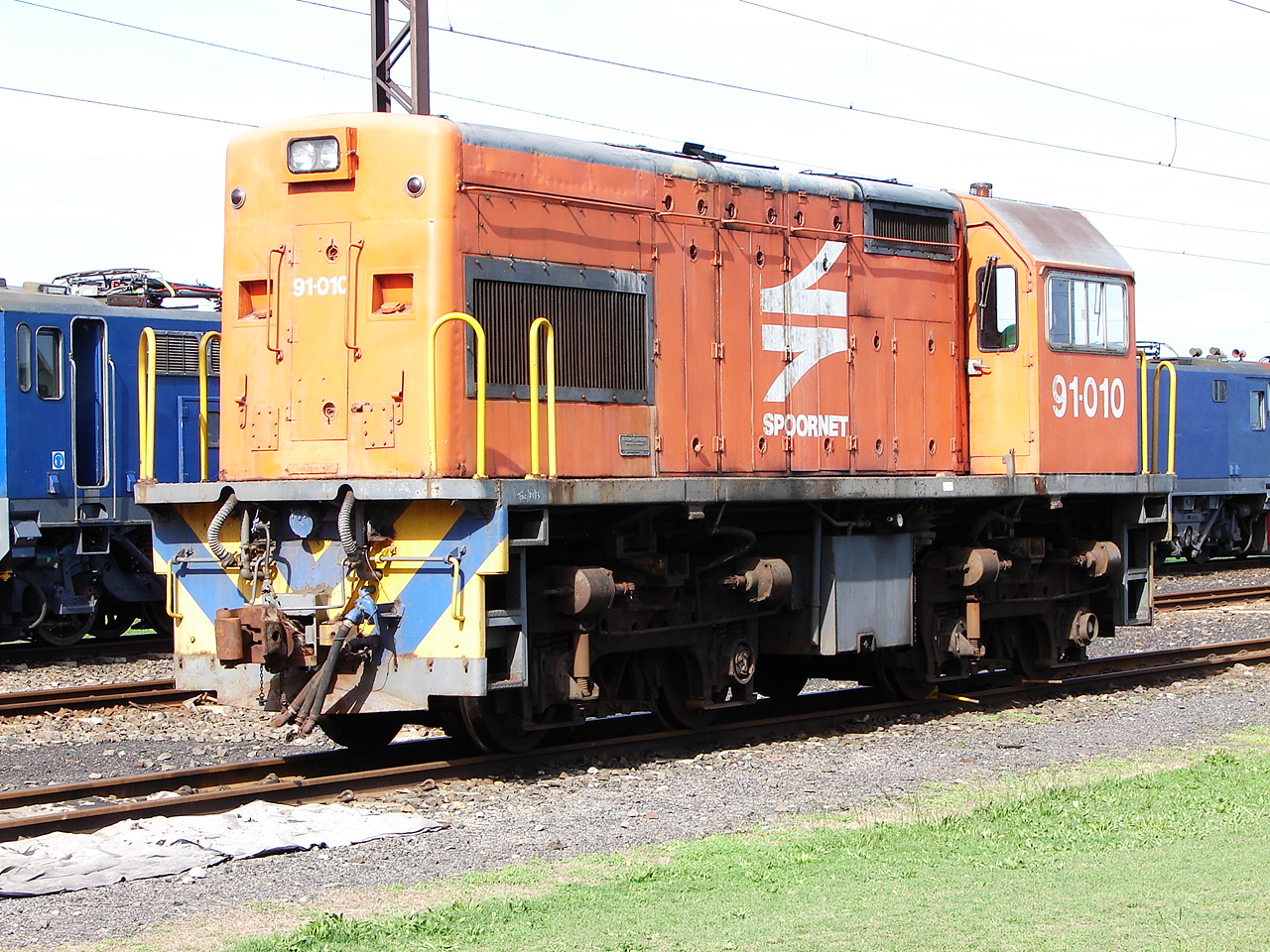
Class 91-000 no. 91-010 on Class 36-000 bogies, Swartkops, 21 April 2013

Bogies and traction motors from Class 36-000 locomotives were often used under the 2 ft (610 mm) narrow gauge Class 91-000 GE UM6B diesel-electric locomotives when they were being transferred between the Cape and Natal narrow gauge systems. These "Bigfoot bogies" enabled them to travel under their own power on 3 ft 6 in (1,067 mm) Cape gauge. Bigfoot bogies were also used under the narrow gauge locomotives whenever they had to be exchanged for maintenance purposes, sometimes running under their own power, sometimes hauled dead.

After most of the Class 91-000 narrow gauge locomotives were withdrawn, one of them was allocated to the Swartkops electric locomotive depot in Port Elizabeth for use as shunting engine. It was also running on Class 36-000 bogies, but with only one bogie powered.

== Illustration ==
The main picture shows no. 36-013 in Transnet Freight Rail livery approaching Rugby in Milnerton from Table Bay Harbour on 4 November 2013. Other liveries which were applied to Class 36-000 locomotives and the sun-shade depot modification are illustrated below.

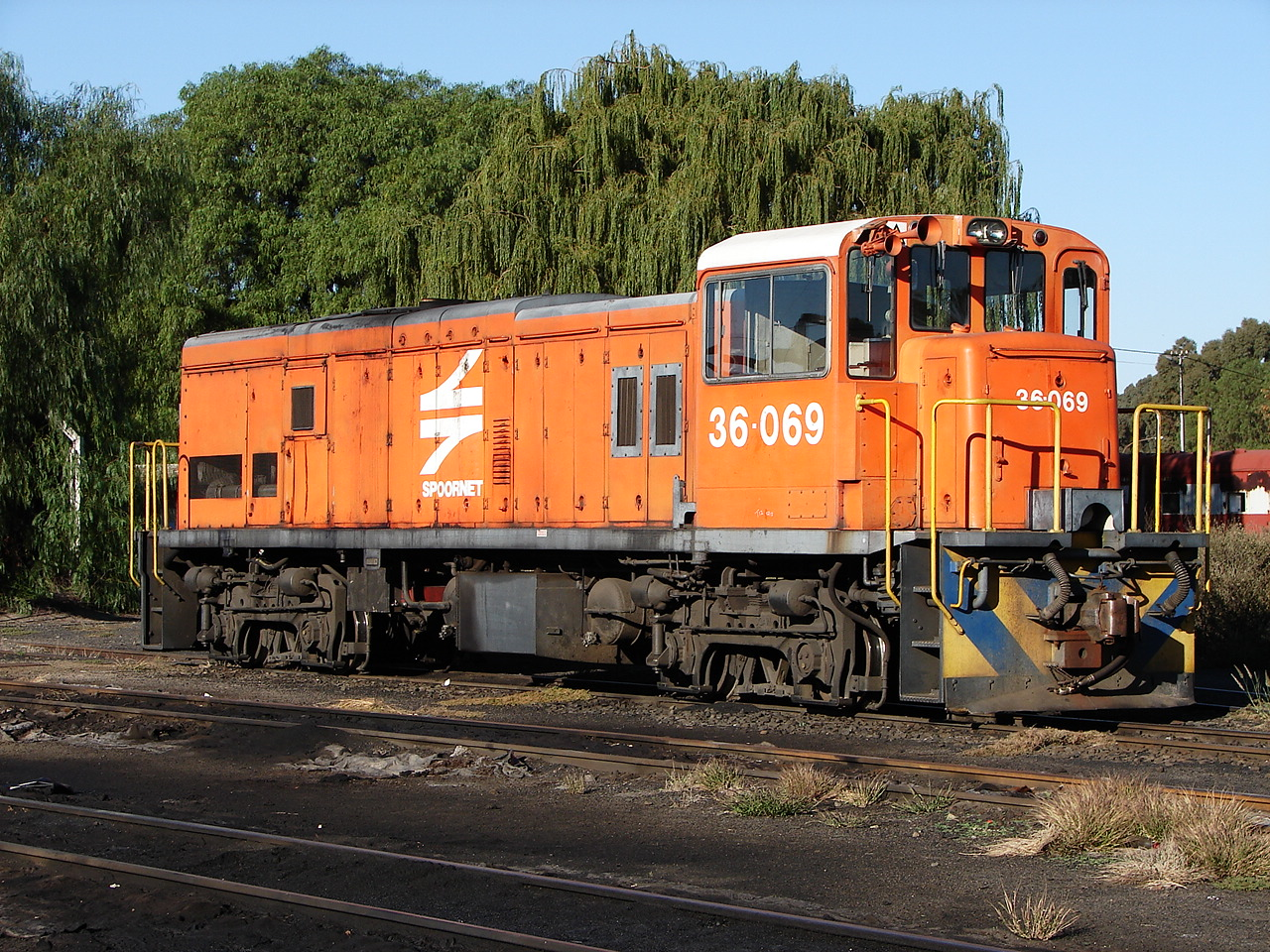
No. 36-069 in Spoornet orange livery at the Bloemfontein Locomotive Depot, 29 April 2013

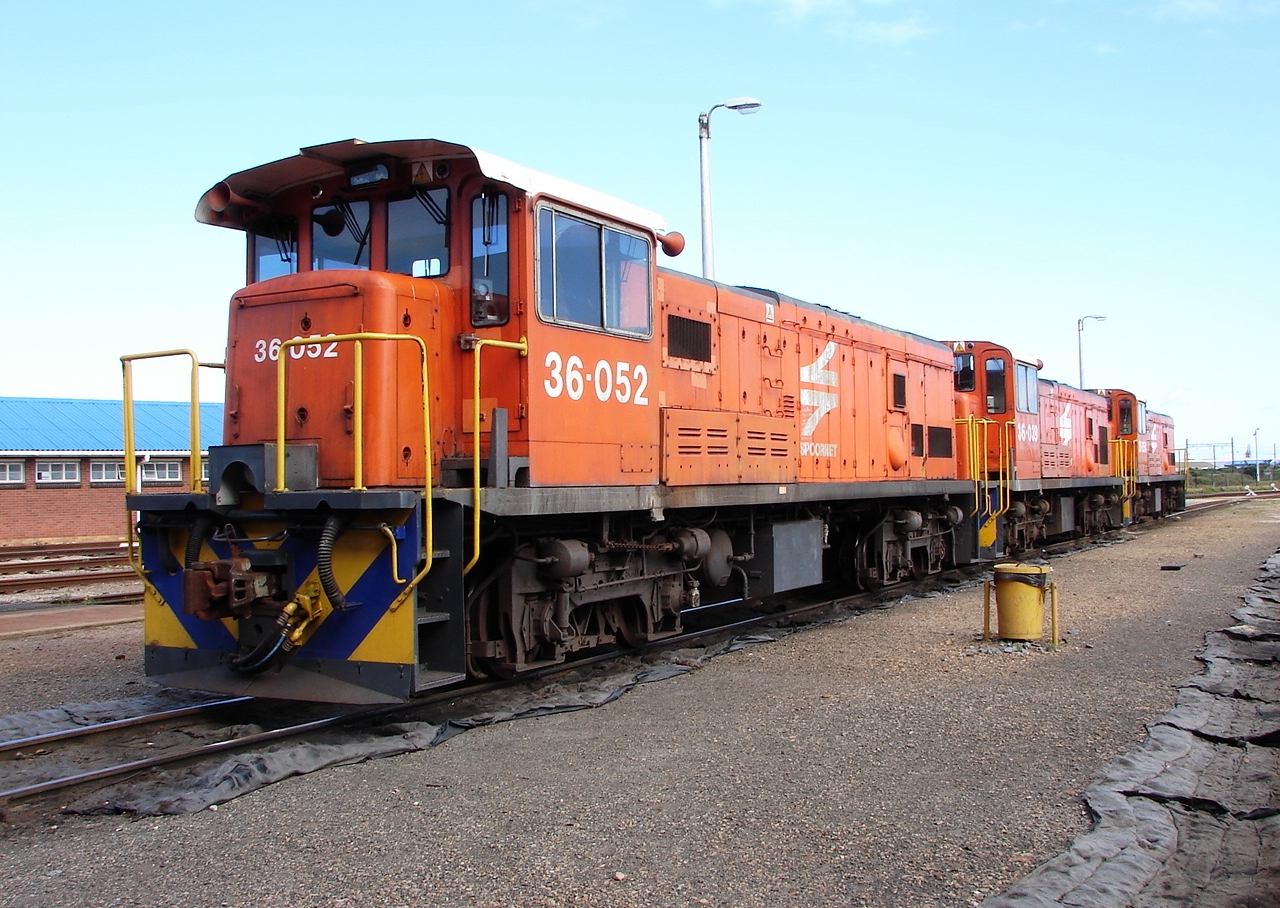
No. 36-052 with a sun-shade modified cab roof at Swartkops, Port Elizabeth, 17 October 2009

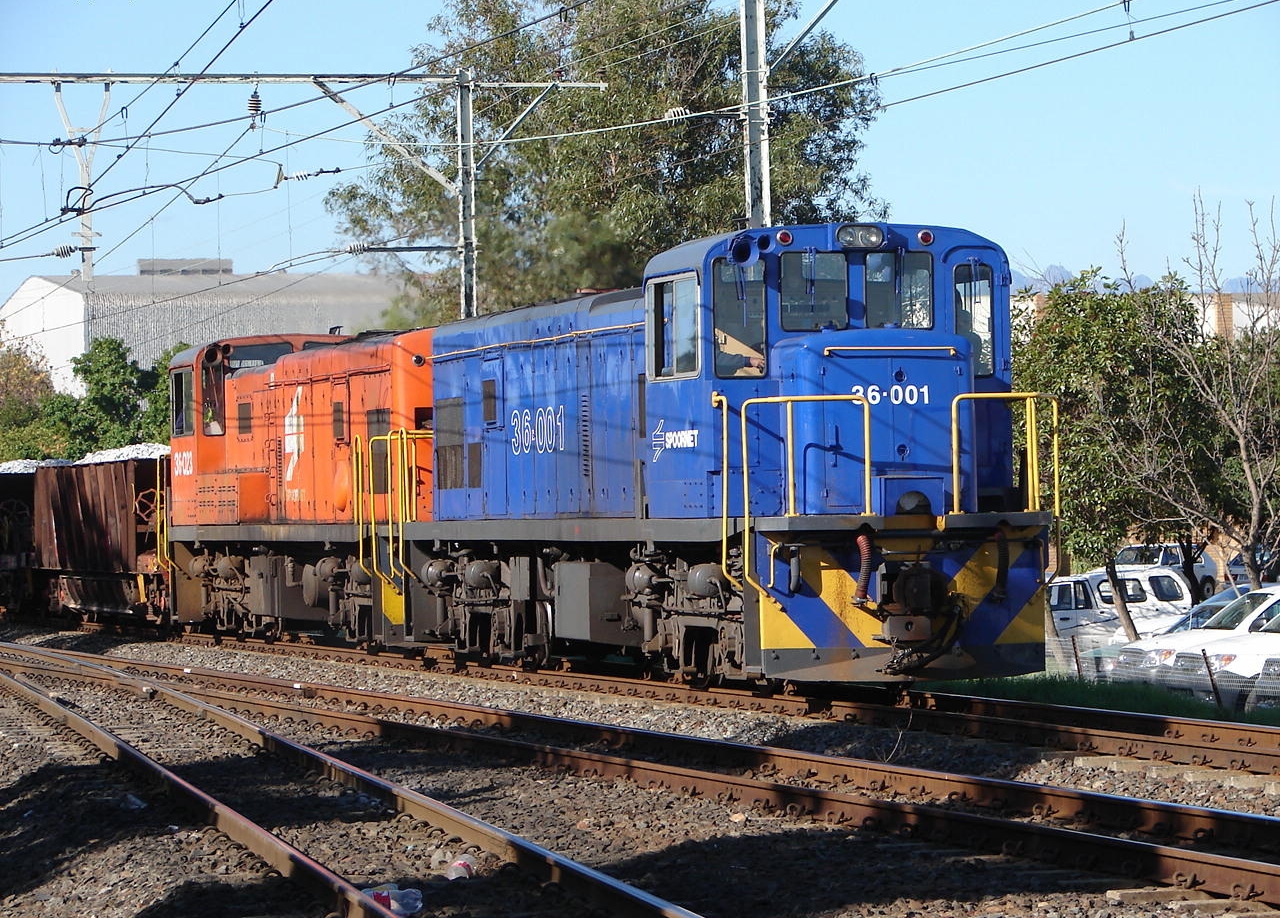
No. 36-001 in Spoornet blue livery with outline numbers at Stikland, Cape Town, 23 May 2007

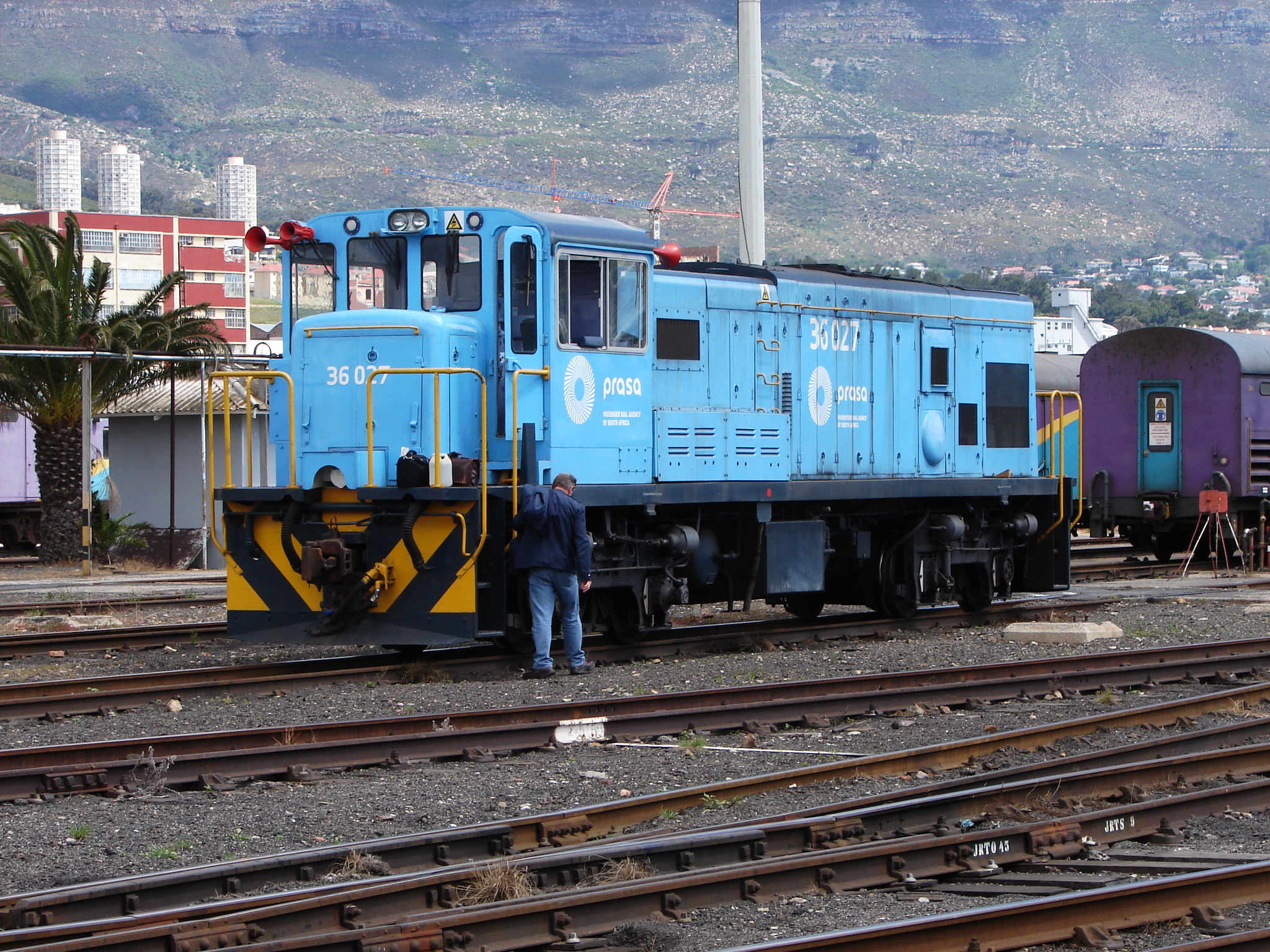
No. 36-027 in Passenger Rail Agency of South Africa blue livery at Culemborg Yard, Cape Town, 15 October 2015

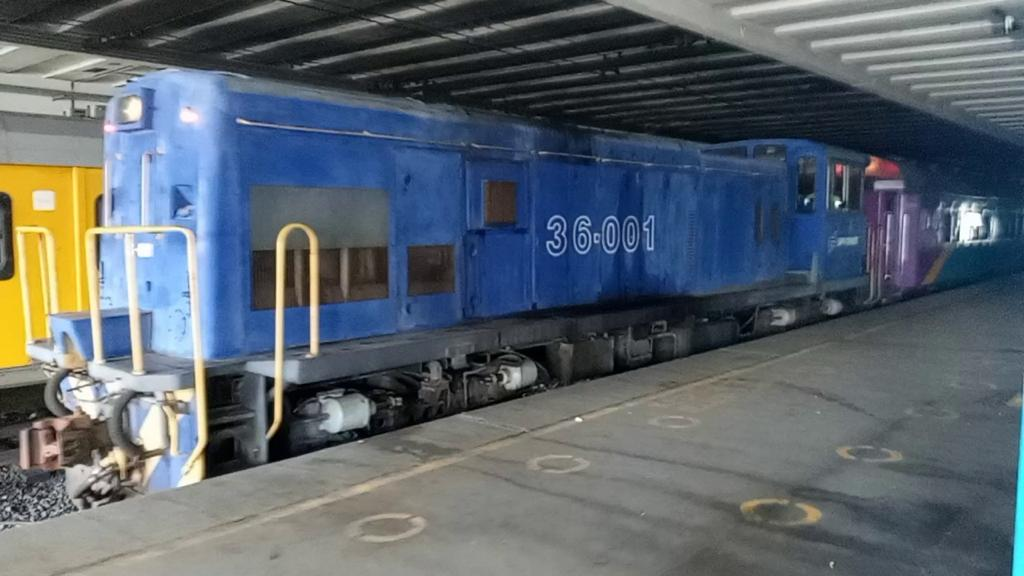
No. 36-001 in Spoornet blue livery with outline numbers at Cape Town Station carrying Shosholoza Meyl Carriages, 09 December 2023
