= Surtees Rail Group =

South African railway company

- Industry: Locomotive manufacturing, maintenance & leasing
- Founded: 1950
- Founder: Arthur Surtees
- Headquarters: Johannesburg, South Africa
- Products: Railway locomotives
- Owner: Surtees family
- Subsidiaries: African Rail & Traction Services; Surtees Engineering; Surtees Railway Supplies
- Website: www.surtees.co.za

The Surtees Rail Group is a South African railway company. It was founded in 1950 by Arthur Surtees manufacturing, repairing and supplying steam locomotive and hopper equipment and parts for the industrial rail road industry in Southern Africa. With the introduction of diesel hydraulic and diesel electric locomotives in the early 1960s it also began to import, manufacture and stock equipment and parts for these locomotives.

== African Rail & Traction Services ==
African Rail & Traction Services (ARTS) specialises in the purchase, overhaul and lease of locomotives, trackmobiles and other rolling stock. It operates out of a workshop complex in Pretoria. It owns and hires out its own fleet of tractive power which consists of in the main, Electro-Motive Diesel, General Electric, Hunslet and Funkey locomotives. It has purchased locomotives from as far afield as Australia.
