= Glossary of North American railroading =

List of terminology used in North American railroading

This article contains a list of terms, jargon, and slang used to varying degrees by railfans and railroad employees in the United States and Canada. Although not exhaustive, many of the entries in this list appear from time to time in specialist, rail-related publications. Inclusion of a term in this list does not necessarily imply its universal adoption by all railfans and railroad employees, and there may be significant regional variation in usage.

== 0–9 ==
3-step protection (US)
The protection given by a locomotive engineer to an employee working near, between, or under cars to which the locomotive is coupled, via a three-step process:
1. Fully apply independent brake.
2. Set reverser to neutral.
3. Turn off generator field (or notify the ground employee, depending on company-specific rules and locomotive type, that protection is provided).
10 wheeler (US)

The 10-wheeler wheel arrangement

A steam locomotive with a 4-6-0 wheel arrangement
241 (US)
Procession of a train past a stop signal with verbal permission from the dispatcher. Derives from Rule 241, which is used to grant such permission under certain rule sets.
14L, 14(l), or 19b
Refers to the "Long Long Short Long" or "- - o -" Horn pattern used by US and Canadian railroads at grade crossings. The term "14L" is derived from Rule 14(l) in the Canadian Rail Operating Rules and Consolidated Code of Operating Rules. "19b" is derived from Rule 19(b) in the Northeast Operating Rules Advisory Committee, mainly used by railroads located in the Northeast United States.

== A ==
A unit (US)

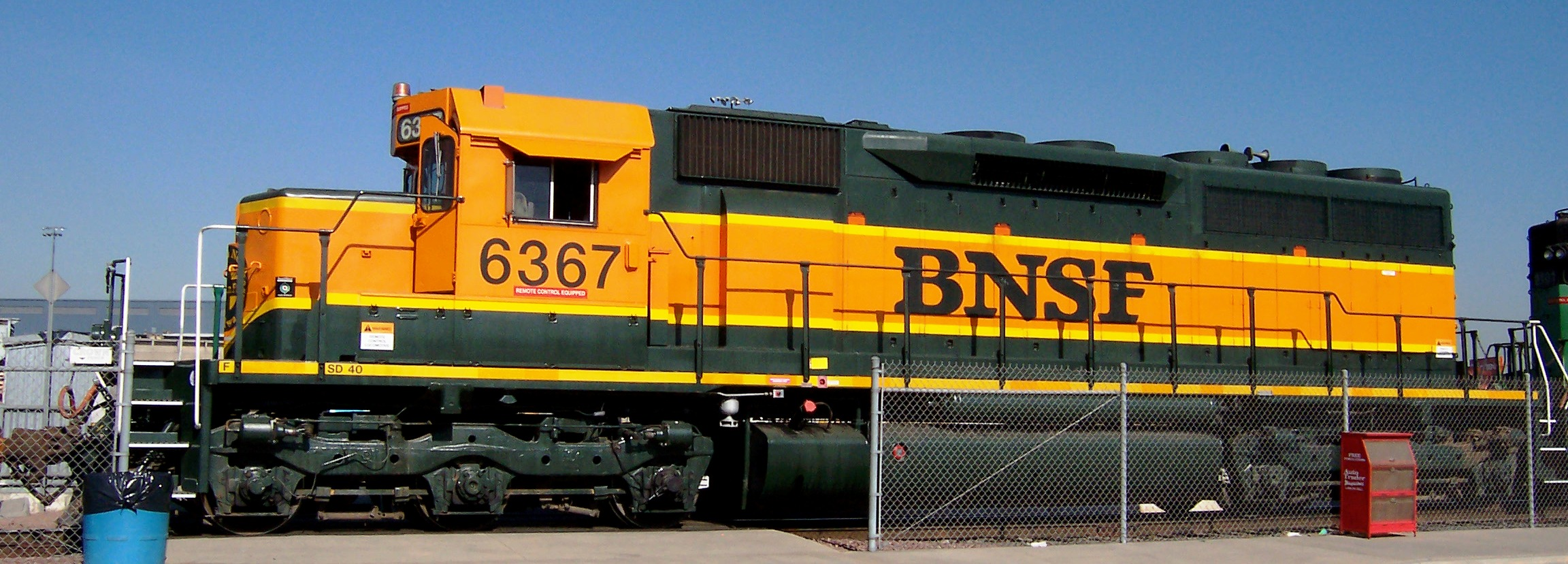
A BNSF Railway A unit

A diesel locomotive (or more rarely an electric locomotive) equipped with a driving cab and a control system to control other locomotives in a multiple unit, and therefore able to be the lead unit in a consist of several locomotives controlled from a single position
ACe
A nickname for EMD's SD70ACe locomotive
Advanced Civil Speed Enforcement System (ACSES)
A positive train control cab signaling system developed by Alstom
Advanced Train Control System (ATCS)
A system of railroad equipment designed to ensure safety by monitoring locomotive and train locations, providing analysis and reporting, and automating track warrants and similar orders.
Alligator
ALCO RSD-15 locomotive, named for its long, low nose
Amcan
An Amfleet passenger car, named because the car shape is a rounded stainless steel tube
Angel seat (US)

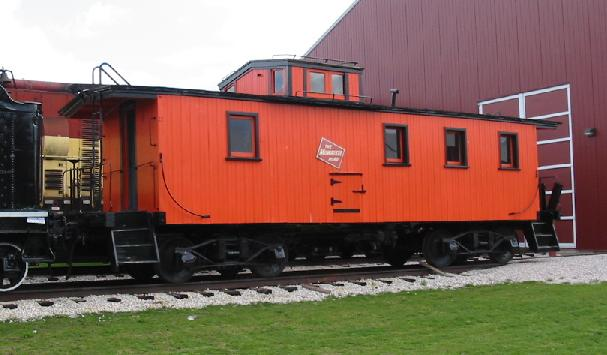
A cupola-style caboose with an angel seat above

The second level seats on a cupola-style caboose
Angle bar
A metal plate that joins the ends of rails in jointed track
Amshack
A small shelter that serves as a train station for Amtrak trains in a small town. Normally, there are no staffed services offered at these small stations. More generally, any station built under Amtrak's Standard Stations Program in the 1970s and 1980s.
Association of American Railroads (AAR)
An industry trade group representing primarily the major freight railroads of North America (Canada, Mexico and the United States)
Automatic equipment identification (AEI) (US)
An automatic tracking system using RFID technology
Auto Train (US)
A passenger train service first operated by Auto-Train Corporation and then by Amtrak between Lorton, Virginia and Sanford, Florida that carries the passengers' automobiles aboard the same train in autoracks
Autorack or auto carrier (US)

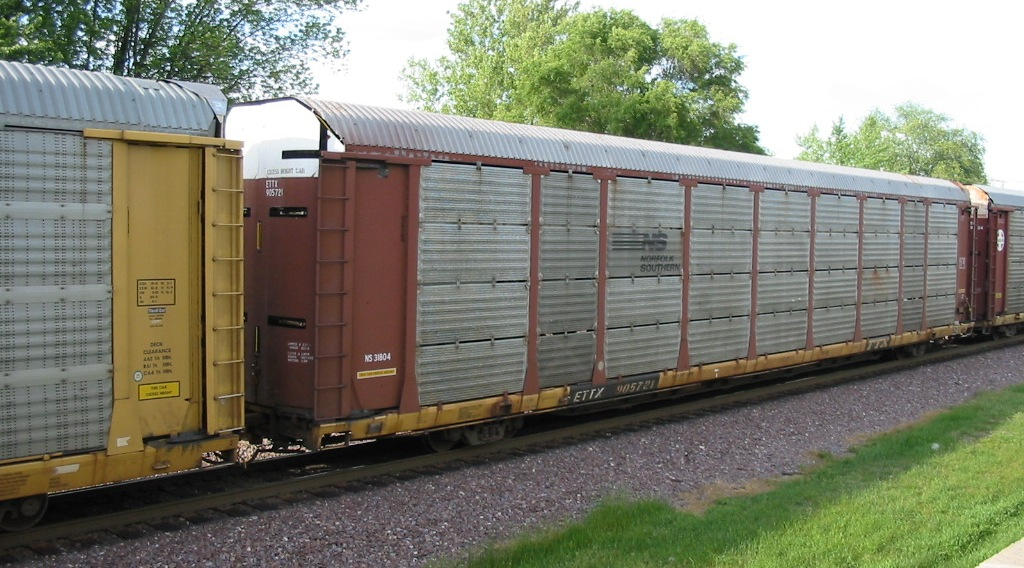
A consist of autorack cars

A specialized freight car for transporting automobiles

== B ==
B-Boat
A GE B23-7, B30-7, or B36-7 locomotive. By analogy with U-boat, since with the Dash 7 line, the "B" or "C" moved to the beginning of the designation.
Baby Boat

A GE U18B locomotive

Baby Tunnel Motor
An EMD GP15-1 or GP15T locomotive, so-called because its low air intakes resemble those of the much larger SD40T-2 and SD45T-2
Bad order
A rail car that has a mechanical defect, and is sometimes set out on a spur to be repaired. The statement, "I am going to set out a bad order" is railroader slang for a bathroom break (usually a "number two" type break).
Bandit
A nickname for Chicago, Milwaukee, St. Paul and Pacific Railroad (Milwaukee Road) locomotives after the railroad was sold to the Soo Line Railroad. Soo Line covered up the Milwaukee Road name and logo on the orange locomotives with black paint, causing them to resemble bandits. Also often applied to similarly patched, second-hand locomotives, especially if the patches are crudely applied.
Baretables
Empty flat, spine, or well cars
Beans or Going to Beans
Taking a break from work to eat
Big Blue
A nickname for Conrail due to the medium blue livery that their locomotives were painted
Big G
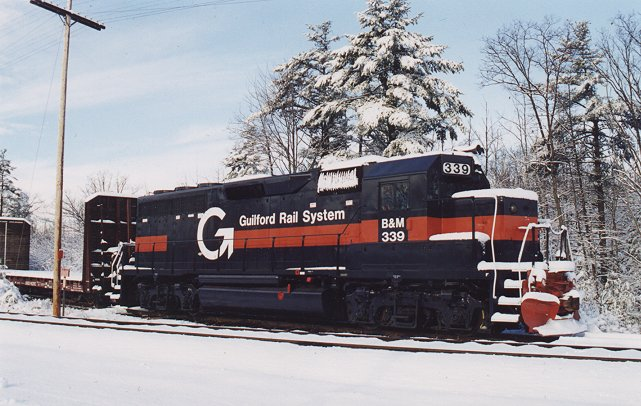
1. A Guilford Rail System locomotive showing the Big G paint scheme
  A nickname for Guilford Rail System, in reference to the large "G" emblem on their locomotives and boxcars
2. The Great Northern Railway
Big Hole
1. The "Big Hole" is the Emergency position of the engineer's air brake valve.
2. When the engineer makes an emergency brake application, he moves his brake valve to the emergency, "Big Hole", position. The result of putting the air brake valve into the Big Hole position will cause the instantaneous total loss of all brake air pressure in the train line which causes the brakes on all train cars and engines to automatically apply creating an emergency stop of the train. This action is called, "Big Holing It".
3. If a train line is "broken" either to an unexpected uncoupling or a train line hose rupture caused by a derailment or other accident, a "Big Hole" condition occurs which causes the total loss of all brake air pressure in the train line which automatically causes an emergency stop of the train.
Big hook
A railroad crane
Big Mac
A nickname given to EMD's SD70MAC, SD80MAC, and SD90MAC locomotive models
Big Orange
A nickname given to BNSF, named after their orange livery
Billboard
Atchison, Topeka and Santa Fe Railway locomotive in the pre-1972 blue and yellow scheme
Black Widow
A Southern Pacific locomotive (all black with some silver)
Bloody Nose
A Southern Pacific locomotive (post-1959 gray and red paint scheme where the nose of the diesel locomotive was painted in scarlet red), or the Amtrak Phase I paint scheme: A reddish-orange nose and then the Amtrak Chevron logo on the side of the locomotive.
Bluebonnet
One of two Santa Fe paint schemes. The standard freight scheme from 1972 until the BNSF Railway merger was dark blue with yellow on the front, with the same color division as the warbonnet scheme. It is also known as Yellowbonnet. Bluebonnet can also mean a warbonnet unit with only the red painted over, resulting in a silver and blue locomotive; this was used on passenger engines transferred to freight service after the formation of Amtrak.
Bluebirds
There are two different uses of this term.
1. 1. A nickname given to GE U34CH locomotives because they were delivered in dark blue and silver NJDOT paint
2. 2. A nickname given to Alco PA locomotives of the Nickel Plate Road due to their distinctive royal blue and white paint scheme.
Blueliners
A nickname given to the Reading Railroad's heavyweight MU cars, in reference to the bright blue and white paint scheme they wore in later years before being sold to SEPTA
Bolster
A transverse floating beam member of truck suspension system supporting the weight of vehicle body
Blue Devil
A Canadian National locomotive painted in a blue-and-white livery
Booster
A cabless B unit or slug. Although a slug and a B unit differ in terms of an engine, both serve the purpose of adding more tractive effort.
Boxcar

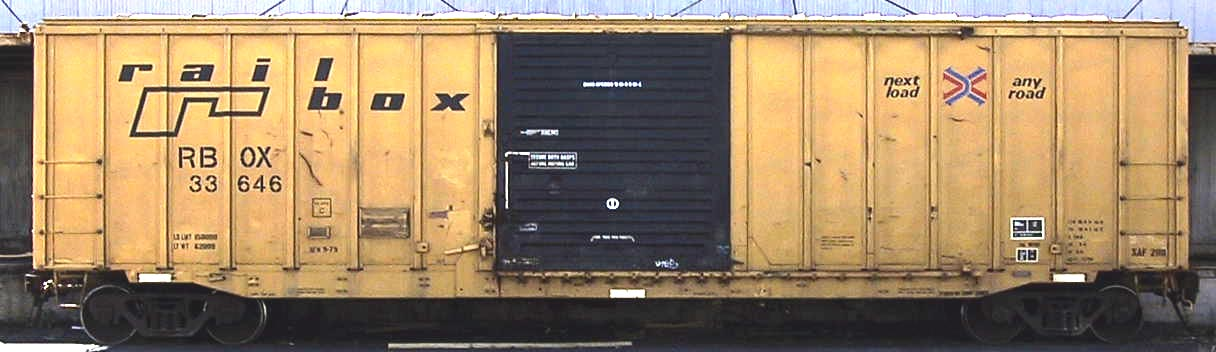
A boxcar

A type of rolling stock with a flat bottom enclosed on all sides and top, which is loaded and unloaded from sliding doors on each side
Brakeman (US)
A train crew member who performs railcar and track management, often a single job description along with switchman ("brakeman/switchman"). A brakeman manually activated brakes on railroad cars before the advent of air brakes.
Brakeman's caboose (US)
A small hut at one end of a railway wagon to protect the brakeman from the elements
Buda Car
A type of inspection car or speeder, typically streamlined, manufactured by Buda Engine Co. They were sometimes built out of an ordinary automobile body, with flanged wheels added. They were driven by small engines from 30 to 200 horsepower.
Buffer car or spacer car
A railroad car, typically empty, placed between a train's locomotives and cars containing hazardous materials, particularly unit trains carrying oil.
Buggy
A caboose on the Boston and Maine Railroad
Bull
A railroad police officer
B unit

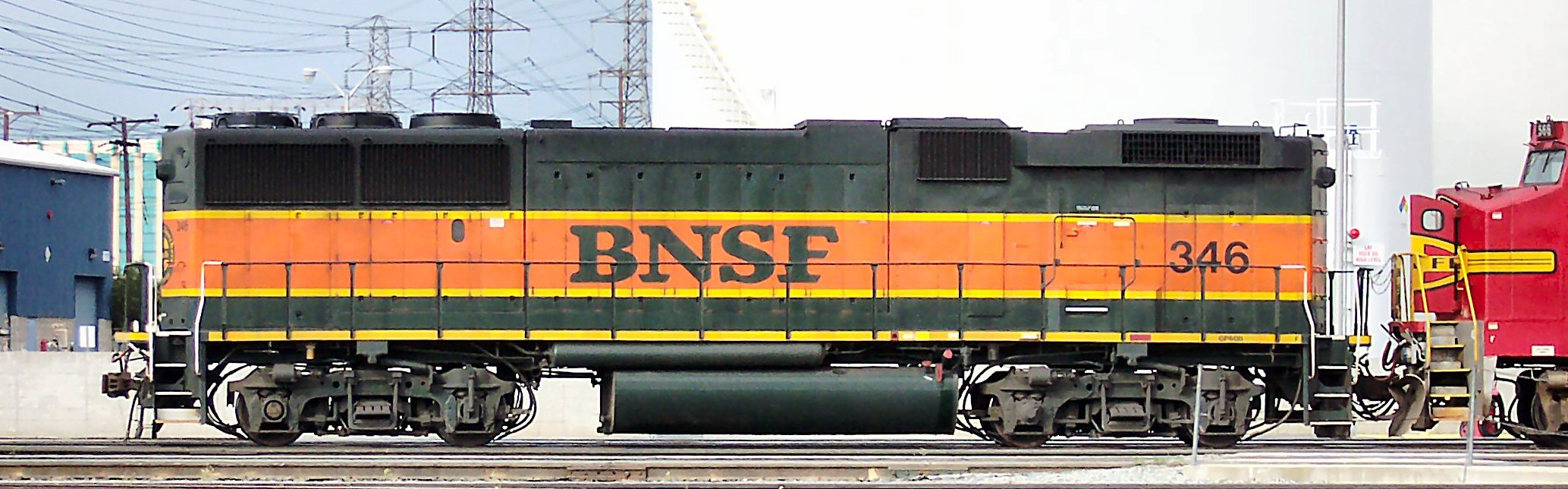
A BNSF Railway B Unit

A cabless booster locomotive, controlled via multiple unit from a cab-equipped A unit, sometimes equipped with limited controls for hostling
Butthead or Butt Head
GM Electro-Motive Division model 'MP' or 'SW' endcab switching locomotives

== C ==
C Light (US)
A single lamp attached to wayside signals with a "C" plate bolted to it. The aspect is Rule 280a - Clear to Next Interlocking. This aspect is only seen in the Eastern United States on rail lines operating Cab Signal Systems. Cab signal lines only have wayside signals at interlockings and diamonds. When a locomotive does not have working cab signals, the dispatcher will activate the C light (indication is a flashing white lamp) to notify the crew that they may proceed to the next interlocking at the speed permitted by the wayside signal's aspect. A locomotive without cab signals that does not receive a C light at an interlocking may proceed past the signal not exceeding Restricted Speed, or with a Form D or other Track Warrant authorization.
Cab car (US)
A passenger coach which has a full set of train controls at one end, allowing for the use of push–pull train operation
Cab unit (US)
A locomotive which derives its structural strength from a bridge-truss design framework in the sides and roof, which cover the full width of the locomotive
Cabbage
Former EMD F40PH locomotives with the diesel engine removed, and a roll-up baggage door installed in the center of the carbody; used as cab/baggage cars in Amtrak push-pull service. Portmanteau of 'cab' and 'baggage'.
Cabin Car
A caboose on the Pennsylvania Railroad (PRR)
Calf

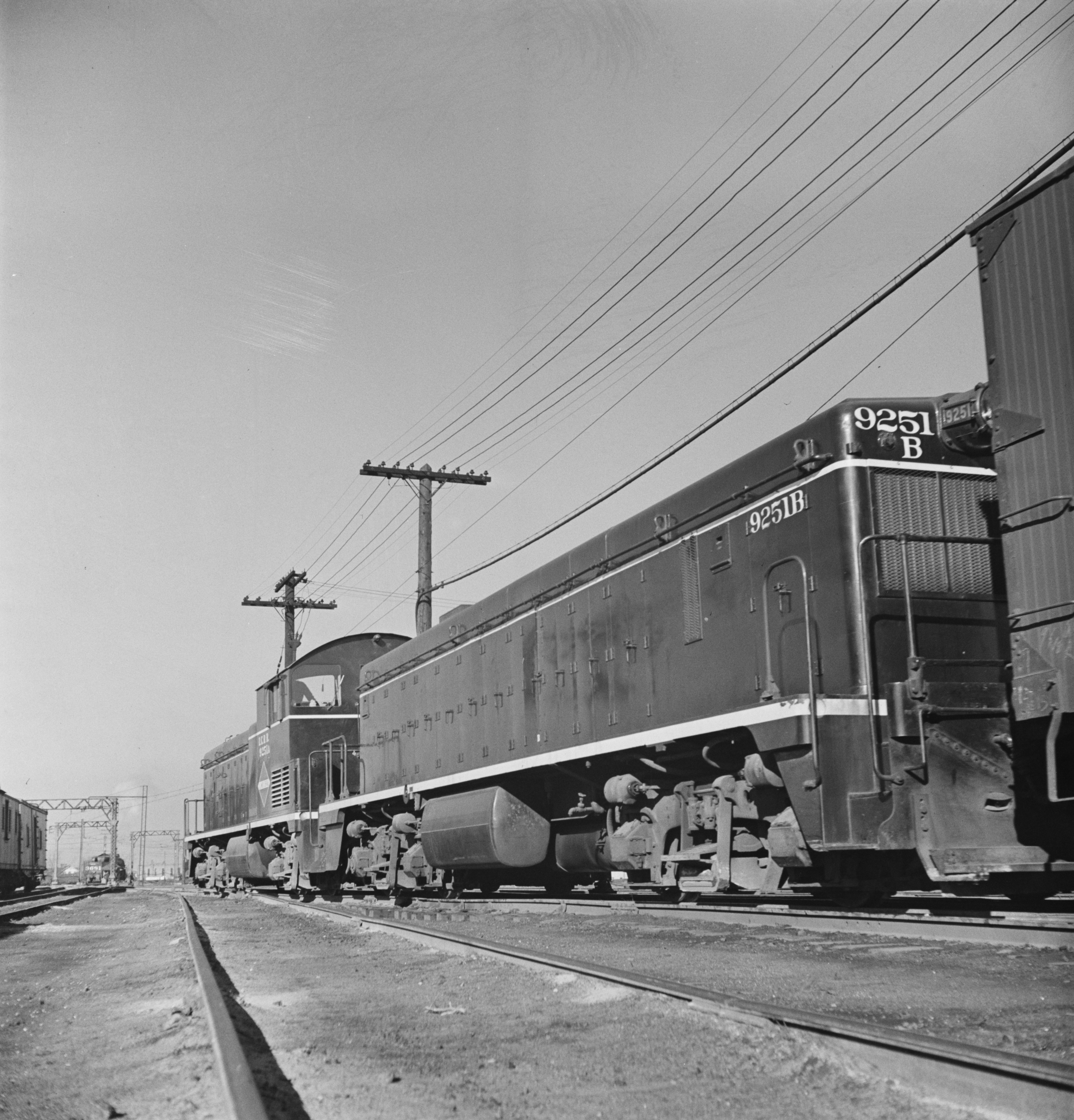
An EMD TR1, one of several models of cow–calf locomotives

A cabless switcher
Can Opener
Conrail's herald
Car knocker
Railroad car repair-person or car inspector. The term is derived from a worker who taps or "knocks" on railroad equipment to check its soundness.
Centennials
Union Pacific's EMD DDA40X locomotives. World's most powerful diesel locomotives, delivered in 1969, the year of Union Pacific's centennial.
Centipede
A nickname given to a 12-axled Baldwin diesel locomotive. Also a tender (as on a steam engine) with seven axles (two axles in a truck, followed by five fixed axles).
Centralized traffic control (CTC) (US)
A system in which signals and switches for a given area of track are controlled from a centralized location
Ches-C
Chessie System's kitten logo; the profile of the Chesapeake and Ohio Railway's sleeping kitten mascot Chessie appears inside the corporate C logo
Cinder dick
Railroad police detective. The term is derived from the fact that railroad police have to walk on ballast, which is sometimes known as "cinders" (before dieselization, many railroads used spent steam locomotive cinders for ballast)
Circus loading
Loading trailers on flatcars sequentially from the end; the standard method of loading in early piggyback service
Coal drag
A train loaded with coal
Coal jimmy
A small, low-capacity hopper car for carrying coal
Codebreak/Codebreaking
Changing the front destination signs on buses or trains, sometimes including rollsign changes.
Coffin car
A nickname for a passenger car with an engineer's cab. Also known as a cab car or control car. So named due to the alleged additional danger posed to passengers in such cars (which are pushed by the heavier trailing locomotive) in frontal collisions.
Color position light (CPL)
A type of signal used most prominently by the Baltimore & Ohio and the Norfolk & Western railroads
Conductor (US)
The person in charge of a train and its crew. On passenger trains, a conductor is also responsible for tasks such as assisting passengers and collecting tickets.
Consist
The group of rail vehicles making up a train, or more commonly a group of locomotives connected together for multiple-unit (MU) operation
Control point (CP) (US)
An interlocking, or the location of a track signal or other marker with which dispatchers can specify when controlling trains
Cornfield meet (US)
A head-on collision between two trains
Coupler (US)

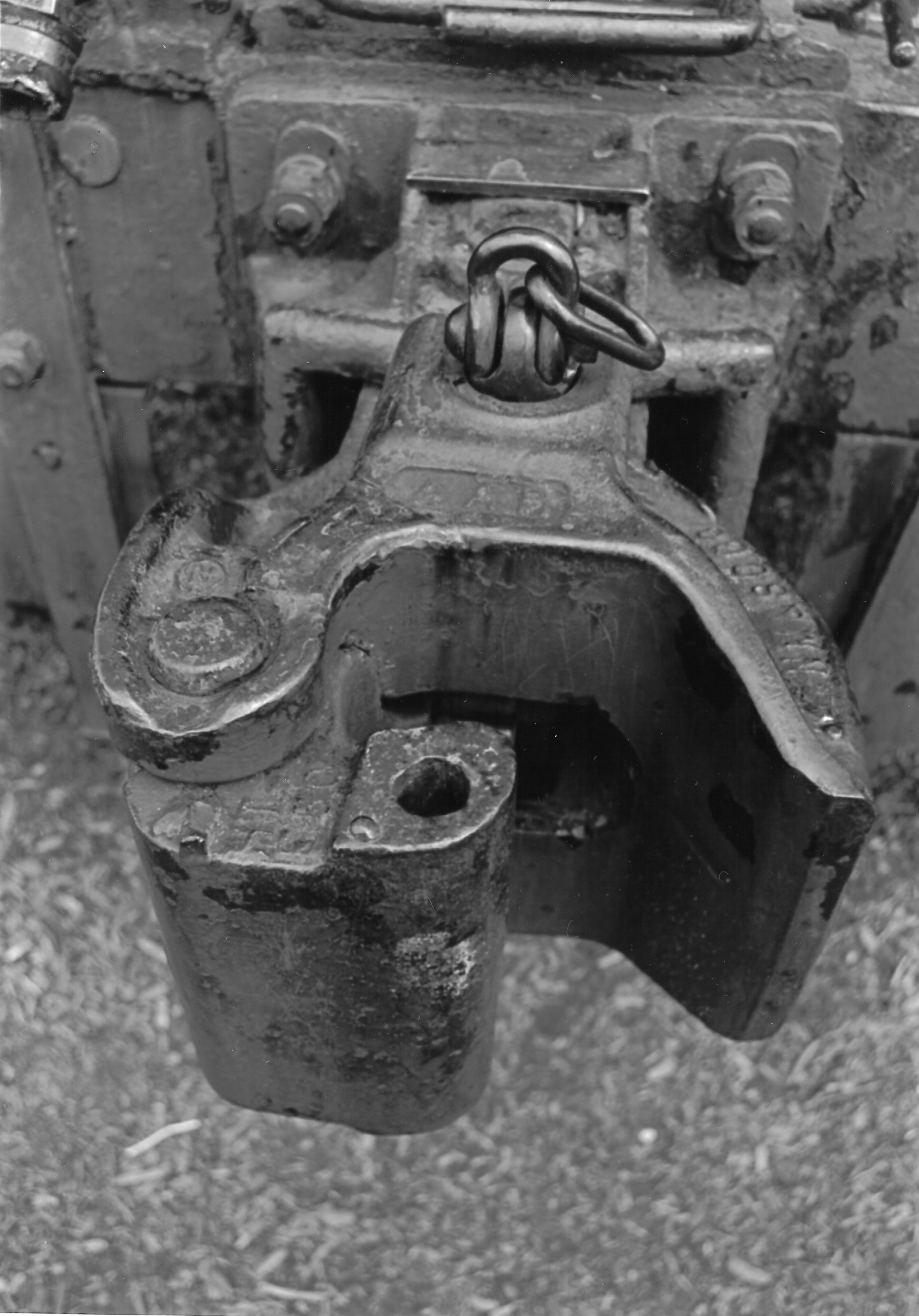
An AAR Type "E" coupler

The mechanical connector at either end of a railroad car allowing it to couple together with other cars to form a train
Covered wagon
An EMD E-unit or F-unit locomotive
Cow
A switcher locomotive, when paired with a calf
Cowl unit (US)

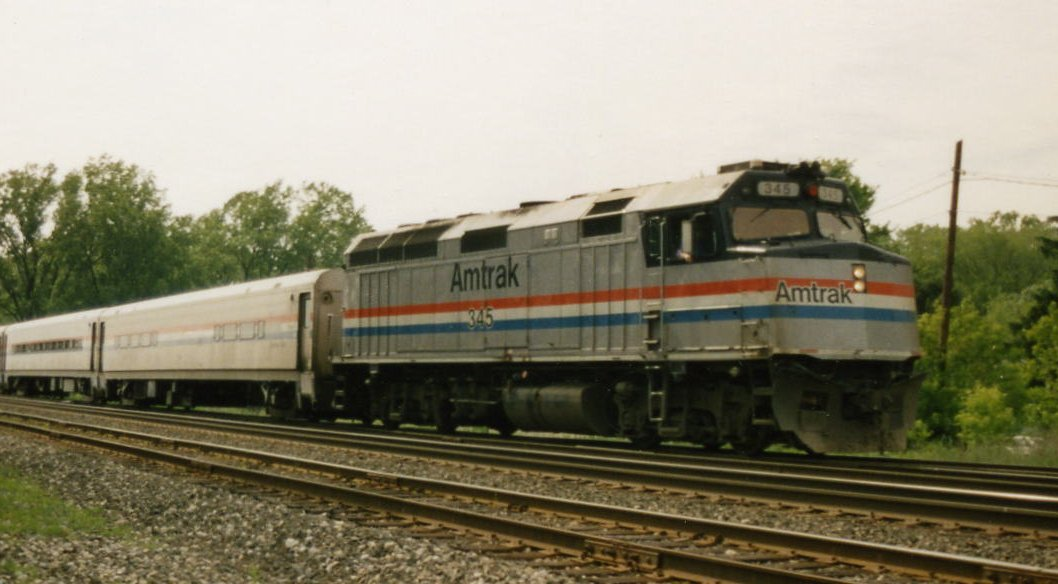
An Amtrak EMD F40PH is one of many cowl units

A locomotive for which structural strength comes from the underframe instead of the sides and roof
Critter
A small industrial locomotive
Cross-tie (US)
See Railroad tie
Crummy
A caboose
Cut (US)
A set of cars coupled together

== D ==
Dark Future

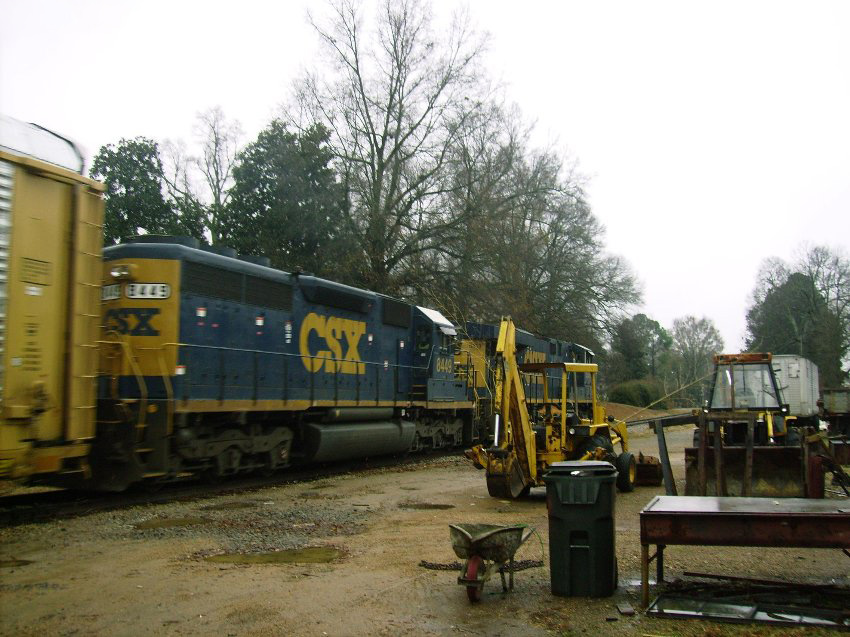
A CSX EMD SD40-2 in Dark Future paint

The CSX paint scheme as of 2026
Dark Territory
Rail lines without wayside (train control) signals
Darth Vader

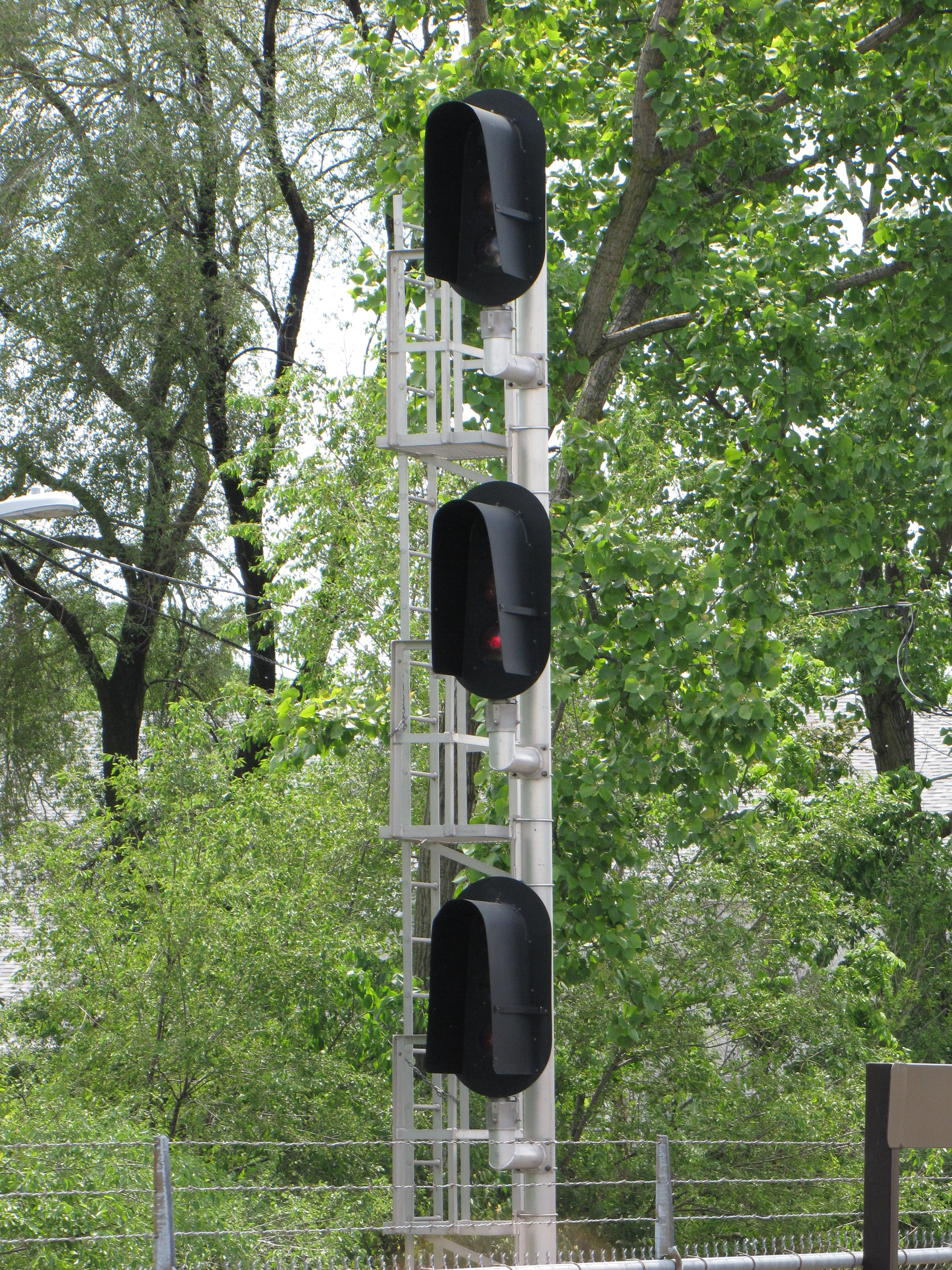
Darth Vader signals

The lens hood on a modern style of railroad signals, due to its vague resemblance to the helmet of Darth Vader from Star Wars
Deadheading
A passenger train that is traveling along a line but is not carrying passengers
Diamond
Level crossing of two railroad tracks, at any angle from 15° to 90°
Dinky
A nickname given to small locomotives, particularly one running in industrial service or on narrow gauge tracks. Also, a small old-fashioned trolley.
Distributed power unit (DPU)
A locomotive or multiple locomotives in the middle or at the end of a train. Can either be staffed or automatically controlled. Staffed units are preferred to be called "helpers" by railfans and some railroad personnel.
Double header (US)
A configuration in which two steam locomotives are coupled head-to-tail in order to haul a heavy train up a long or steep hill. In the present day, double headers (and occasionally triple headers) are done primarily on large passenger trains or as a show for railfans.
Draper-Taper
Nickname for the Canadian-built GMD SD40-2F, SD50F, SD60F, GE C40-8M, and BBD HR-616. These locomotives feature a full-width carbody with improved rear visibility, designed by William L. Draper, an employee of Canadian National Railway.
Dynamic braking or dynamics
A method of braking in which the motors on the locomotive wheels generate electric power from the momentum of the moving train, and this power is dissipated through resistor grids as heat
Dynamite the train or dynamite
Causing an emergency brake application (whether intentional or not)

== E ==
Eight and sand
Term used to wish train crews well wishes and quick uneventful journey. Comes from notch 8 (the highest power setting of modern locomotive throttles), and to apply sand to prevent wheel slipping.
Elephant style

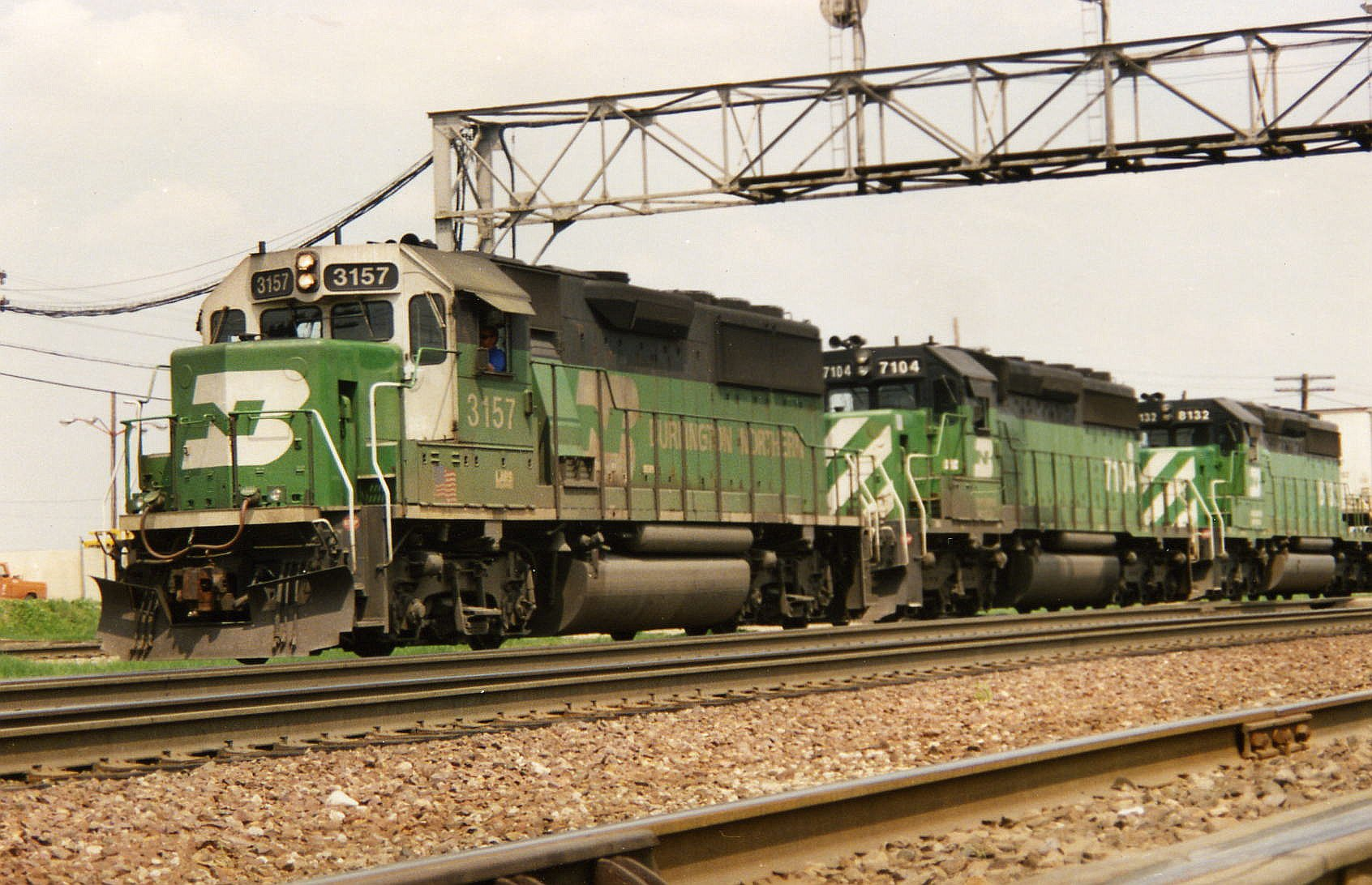
Three Burlington Northern Railroad locomotives coupled elephant style

Of a consist, having multiple locomotives with all units facing forward, resembling the nose-to-tail train of elephants in a circus parade
Emergency
When a train has made a full brake application due to adverse event, or has lost its train air due to a defective valve (a "kicker"), or a broken air line or train separation. The train crew will normally declare that they are "in emergency" over the train radio, thus warning other trains and the dispatcher that there is a problem.
End-of-train-device (ETD) or flashing rear-end device (FRED)

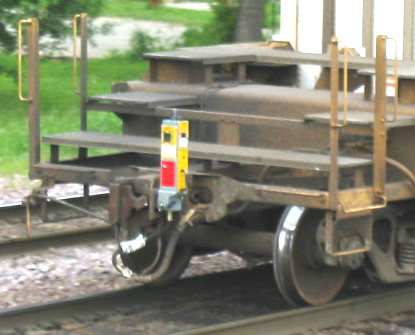
An ETD on a container train

A form of electronic caboose with a flashing red light mounted on the end of a train. Also monitors various train functions such as brake-pipe pressure, motion, and GPS location.
Engineer (US)
The operator of a locomotive
Espee
A nickname given to the Southern Pacific Railroad by railfans
Ex-Con
A former Conrail locomotive or employee
Exempt
The Code of Federal Regulations (49 CFR 392.10) requires drivers of vehicles carrying passengers for hire, school buses carrying students, and vehicles carrying hazardous materials to stop before crossing the tracks. State or local laws or regulations establish which crossings may be posted as "exempt" from this requirement to stop; except when a train, locomotive, or other railroad equipment is approaching or occupying the highway-rail grade crossing, or the driver's view is blocked.

== F ==
Fallen flag
A defunct railroad, having either merged or discontinued operations
Federal Employers Liability Act (FELA)
A US federal law that protects and compensates railroaders injured on the job
Federal Railroad Administration (FRA) (US)
The agency which oversees rail operation regulations and safety requirements for US freight, passenger and commuter rail operations
Filet
Converting a double-stack container train to single stack by removing the top layer of containers, allowing the rest of the train to proceed along track that lacks double stack clearance. The removed containers can be trucked to local destinations. The opposite process is toupee.
Flares
The EMD SD45, with its dynamic brake blisters and radiators that distinctively flare from the top of the unit. Also Flare 45. Both forms distinguish the SD45 from the SD45-2 and SD45T-2, which lack flared radiators.
Flatcar (US)

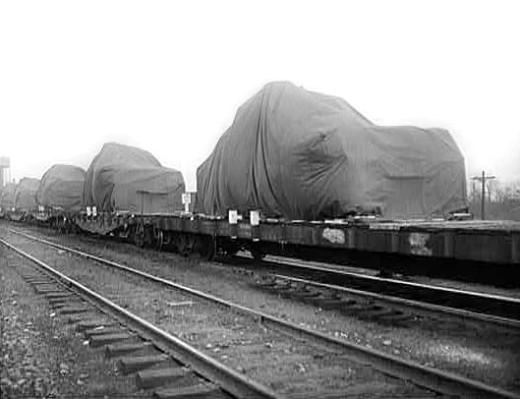
A train of loaded flatcars. Photograph by Arthur Siegel.

A type of rolling stock, which can be a flat-bottomed car with no sides on which freight (including intermodal containers) can be stacked. A bulkhead is a flatcar with walls on the front and rear. A center-beam bulkhead is a bulkhead flatcar with an additional wall dividing one side of the flatcar from the other, but still without any sides.
Flatback
Industry slang for trailer-on-flatcar service in the 1970s, especially in the trade journal Railway Age
Foamer
A railfan, particularly one whose enthusiasm appears excessive. They figuratively "foam at the mouth" while railfanning.
Flying switch or drop (US)
The practice of uncoupling a locomotive from a car in motion and running over a switch, whereupon an employee on the ground lines the switch to divert the car onto an adjacent track. Once commonplace, this practice has led to several lawsuits against railroad companies and is now strictly prohibited due to the high risk to life and property.
Foreign power

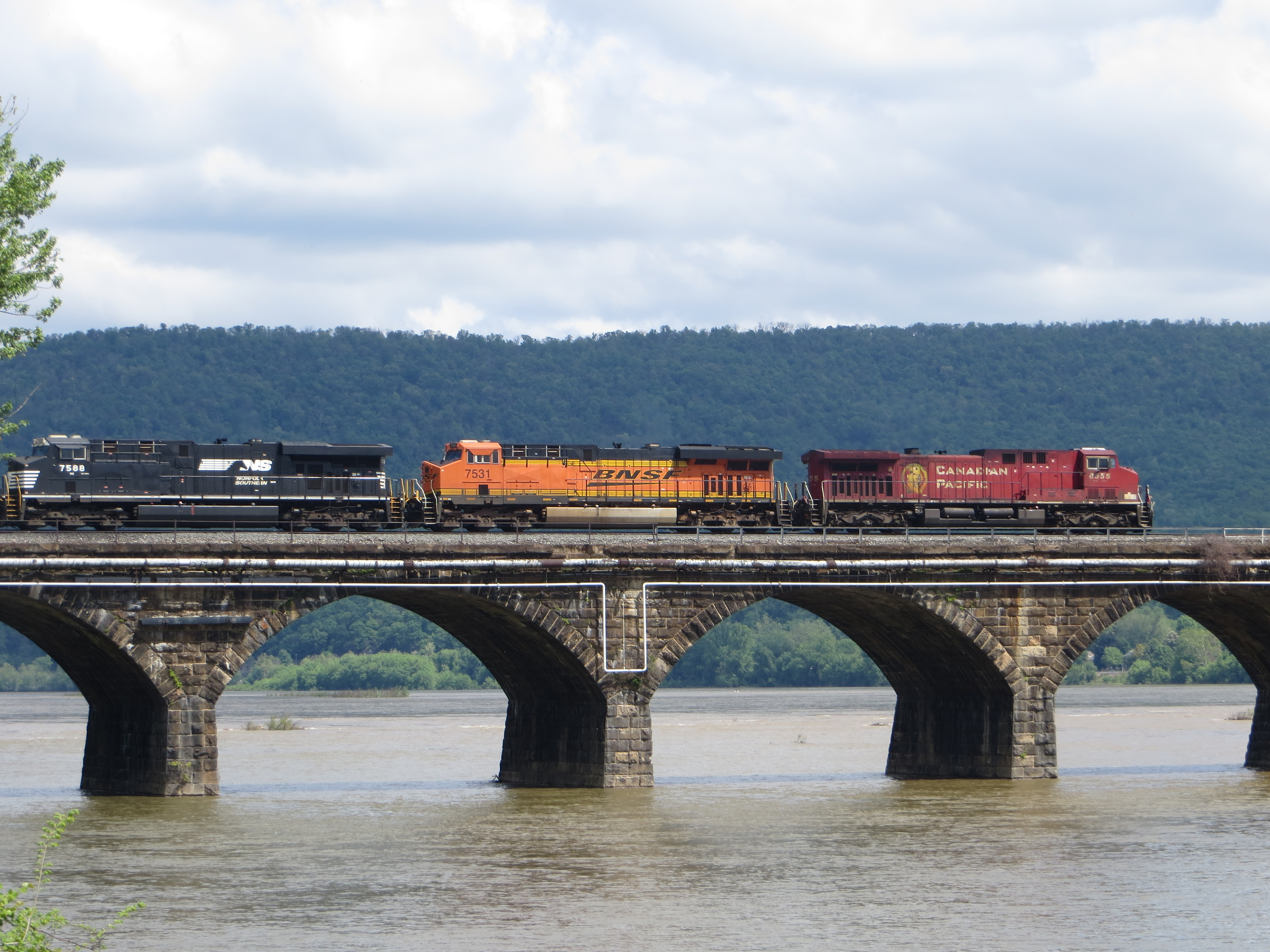
Foreign power from Canadian Pacific and BNSF on a Norfolk Southern train

Motive power from one railroad that runs along another railroad
Form D (US)
A paper form authorizing movements over a specific stretch of track. Also called a Track Warrant Control.
Freight (US)
The products which are carried
Freight car (US)
A car designed to transport freight
Frog (US)
A casting with X-shaped grooves used in switches and crossovers
Fucking rail nut (FRN)
A derogatory term used by some railroaders for railfans
Funeral train
1. A train transporting the bodies of deceased leaders, government officials, or other significant people to a graveyard
2. A train consisting of one or more locomotives carrying other locomotives for scrapping

== G ==
Gandy dancer
A track maintenance worker
Geep
A nickname for EMD's GP series of locomotives
Genset
From "generator set", a locomotive that uses multiple high-speed diesel engines and generators, rather than a single medium-speed diesel engine and a single generator. Sometimes confused with Green Goat locomotives; the only similarities between the two types are their outward appearance and that both are designed to reduce air pollution and fuel consumption.
GEVO
A nickname for GE Evolution Series locomotives, in reference to the GEVO-12 engine used in those units
Goat
A locomotive used in yard switching service
Gondola (US)

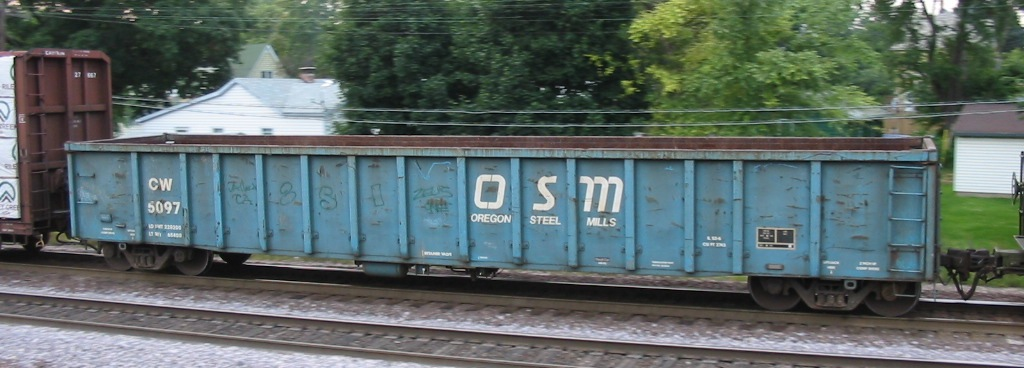
A gondola car

A type of rolling stock with a flat bottom and relatively low sides, used to haul material such as ore or scrap, and loaded and unloaded from the top which may be covered or uncovered
Green and Cream (Cream and Green)
BNSF's post-Burlington Northern green-and-white livery
Green Goat

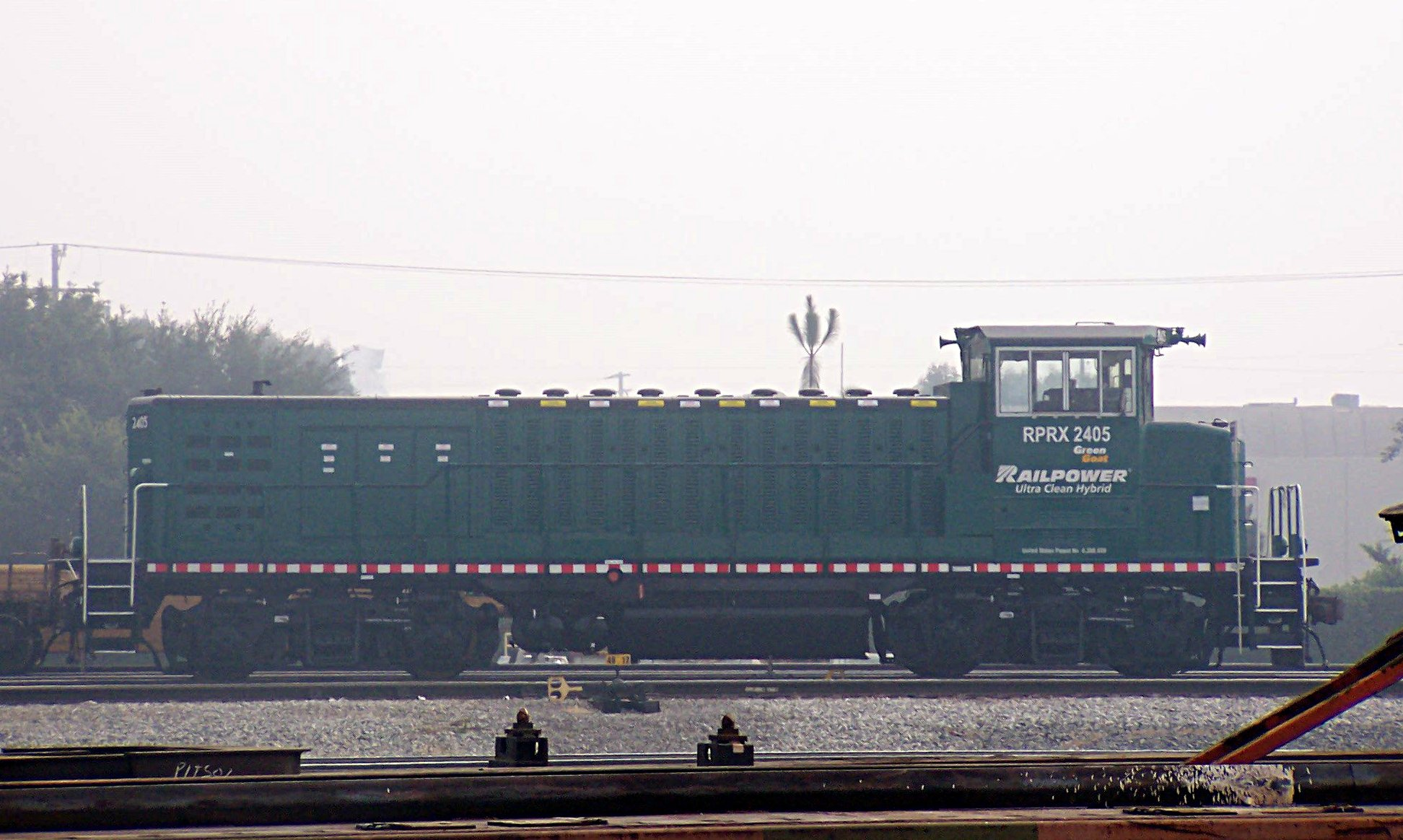
A demonstrator Green Goat locomotive

A type of "hybrid" switching locomotive utilizing a small diesel engine and a large bank of rechargeable batteries
Guard rail (US)
A double rail section of track, sometimes found in train yards and on bridges to prevent derailments or limit damage caused by derailments by having rail on both sides of the wheel flange. Also found on curves with a tight radius, switches, and crossings.

== H ==
Hack
A caboose
Hammerhead
A GE locomotive with "winged" radiators, when running long hood forward
Handcar (US)

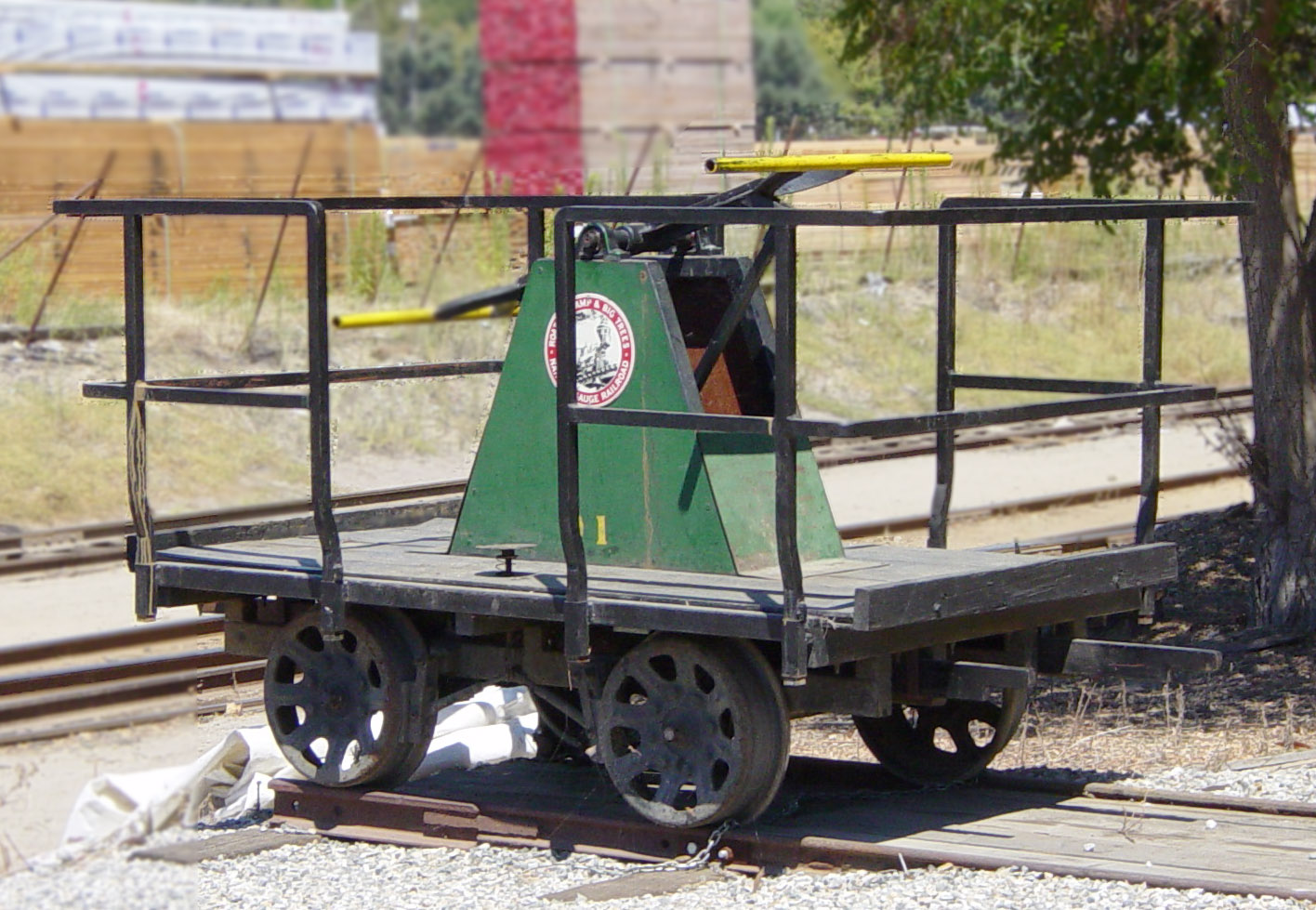
A handcar

A small, hand-powered railroad car used for track inspection
Heavy rail (US)
A city-based transit rail system that runs on its own dedicated track and often underground. Subways are considered heavy rail. Refers to commuter rail and inter-city rail when used by the FRA or in other countries.
Heavyweight (US)
During the period between around 1910 and the mid-1930s, most passenger cars in the US were built with three axle trucks, concrete floors, and riveted, double walled sides and often weighed 90 tons or more. Heavyweight construction was used to improve ride quality.
Helper
A locomotive temporarily coupled to heavy-tonnage trains to assist them over steep grades
High ball
1. Another term for a clear signal, derived from the days of steam where a station operator would hoist a large wooden ball up a standard, signaling that the engineer was authorized to proceed
2. A slang term used among railroad employees to convey to the crew of a train that they were clear to proceed
High cube (US)
A boxcar whose vertical clearance is excessive
Hog law
The federal hours-of-service law that forbids certain classes of railroad employees, including those operating trains, from working longer than a certain time after reporting for duty, currently 12 hours
Hogger
A locomotive engineer
Honorary steam engine
Common term for ALCO diesel locomotives, due to their turbo lag resulting in a tendency to blow large amounts of black smoke when throttling up
Hood unit (US)

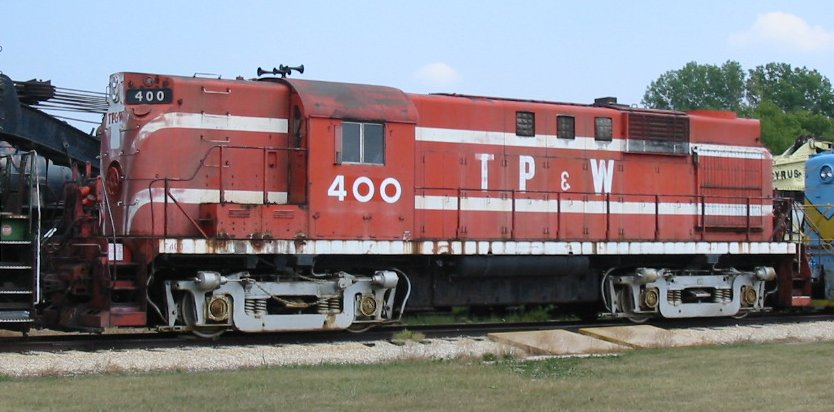
TPW 400, an ALCO RS-11, a type of hood unit

A locomotive whose sides and roof are nonstructural and do not extend the full width of the locomotive. Structural strength comes from the underframe.
Horsehead or 'Mister Ed'
Norfolk Southern's current locomotive livery with a horse's head embedded in the NS Logo
Horsepower hours
How long motive power from another railroad is used on a specific railroad
Hospital train
A train composed of defective "bad order" equipment or locomotives that are en route to a repair shop
Hot box
An overheated wheel bearing. This comes from the era before the widespread use of roller bearings where the ends of an axle rested in solid copper bearings housed in a journal box filled with oil soaked cotton waste. An overheated axle led to a hot journal box that often ignited the oiled waste. The term is used to refer to a railway wheel bearing that has over-heated due to internal friction caused by some fault in the bearing.
Hot rail (US)
1. Any section of track over which a train movement is imminent. The closer or faster the approaching train, the "hotter" the rail.
2. On some electrified railroads and rapid transit lines, the third rail which supplies power to locomotives or cars
Hotel power (US)
Electric power used to provide for the comfort of passengers aboard a train en route
Hotshot (US)
A fast, long-distance train given priority on the track over other trains

== I ==
Interlocking (US)

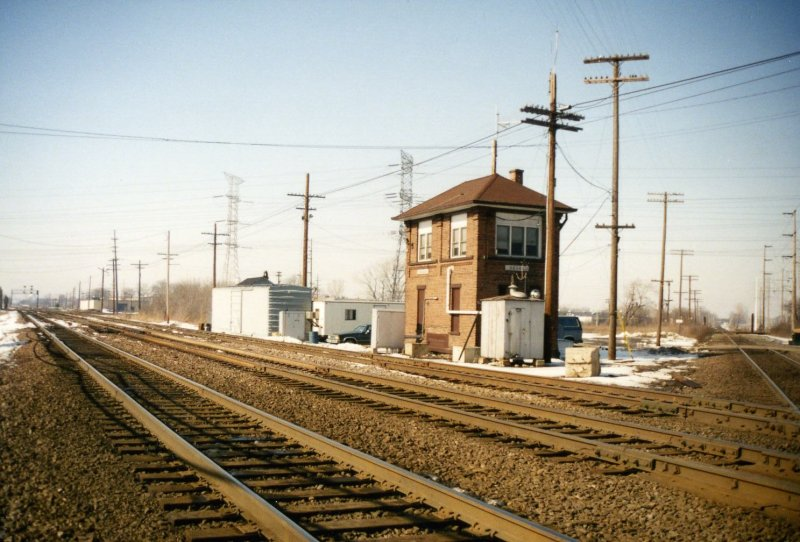
The interlocking tower and tracks in Des Plaines, Illinois

Any location that includes a switch or crossing of two tracks, derived from the early practice of installation of a system of mechanical equipment called an interlocking plant to prevent collisions. See also signal box. Interlocking is also the term for the actual mechanical or electrical apparatus that prevents switch/points and signals from being operated in ways that would allow for conflicting train movements.

== J ==
Jenny (plural Jennies)
A relatively short, open top hopper car primarily used in the transport of iron ore.
Jersey Builder
A nickname given to Central Railroad of New Jersey commuter trains in the 1970s due to the fact it used former Great Northern, Northern Pacific and Burlington Northern railroad passenger cars used on the famed Empire Builder passenger train still in their former owners paint schemes with CNJ patches on them.
Johnson Bar (US)
On a locomotive, a long, heavy lever that operates the reversing gear
Joint
Synonym for the verb "couple" used by brakemen when flat switching a yard. Talking on the radio, they will tell the engineer how many car lengths to back up in order to couple to another car (i.e. "five cars to a joint")
Joint bar (US)
A metal plate that joins the ends of rails in jointed track
Juice Train

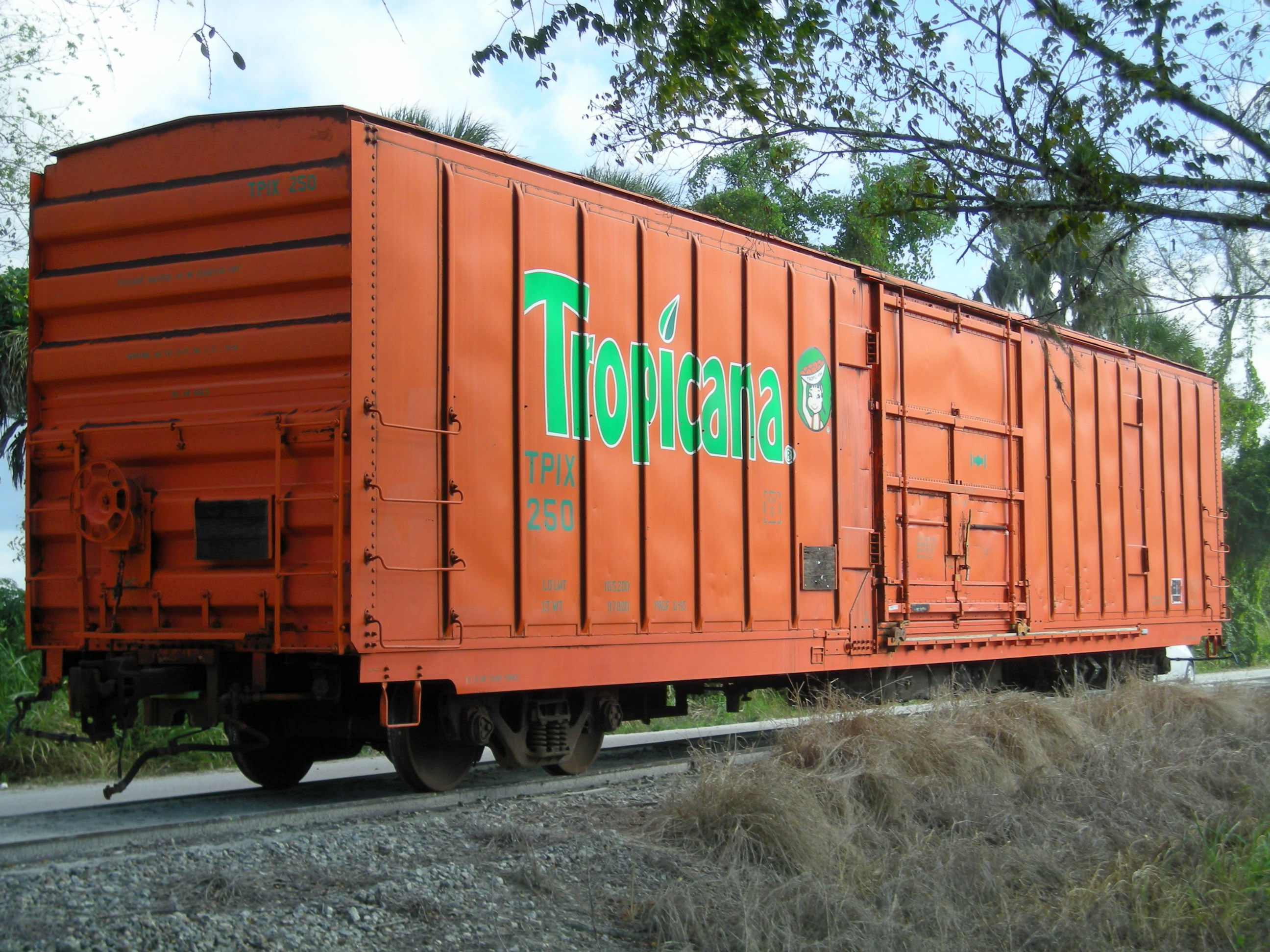
A preserved refrigerator car that was used on the Juice Train

A unit train of Tropicana cars

== K ==
Knock down (US)
To pass an absolute signal and thereby change its aspect to stop; originated in the days of semaphore signals whose arms would drop to the stop aspect when passed
Kodachrome
Southern Pacific Santa Fe Railroad's red, yellow, and black paint scheme, which resembled the packaging of Kodachrome color transparency film. This was the scheme instituted when the merger between Southern Pacific and Santa Fe was assumed to be approved. Hundreds of locomotives were painted in Kodachrome colors before the merger was denied.

== L ==
Lantern (US)

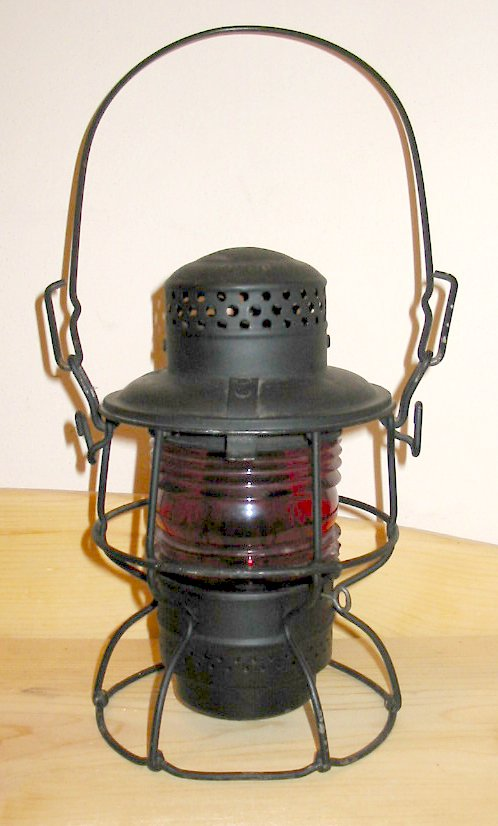
A brakeman's lantern from the Chicago and North Western Railway which burned kerosene to produce light

A portable (often handheld) light source that is used to signal train crews
Level junction (US)
A junction in which all track crossings take place at grade and routings must therefore be controlled by signals and interlocking
Light engine or light power
A locomotive unit traveling to a destination without a train attached. Can be a power pool transfer (relocation of a surplus of locomotives from one location to another), or can be a helper locomotive/locomotives being sent or returning from helping a heavy tonnage train over a grade.
Lightning Slinger
A telegraph operator
Lineup or lined up
To have switches aligned correctly before a move (e.g. over the radio, "Would you call the dispatcher for a lineup so we can get out of here?")
Local
A short freight train that is localized to a specific line or area, and switches out cars from rail yards or industrial spurs
Long hood forward (LHF)

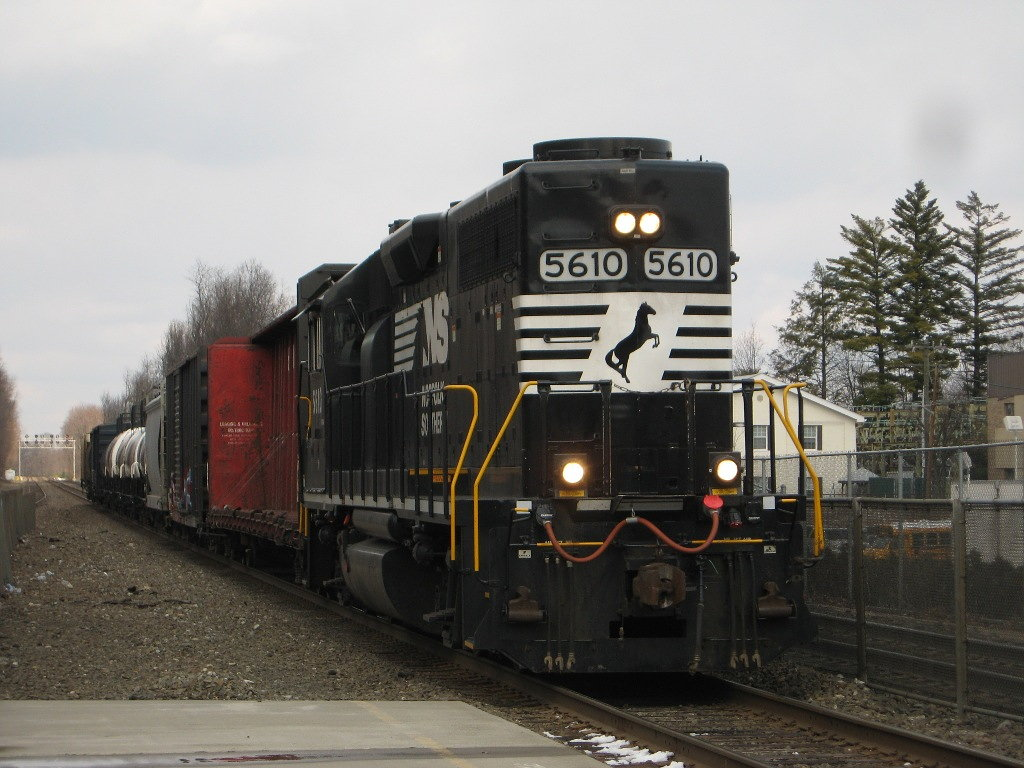
A Norfolk Southern EMD GP38-2 operating long hood forward through Ridgewood, New Jersey.

A locomotive moving backwards (the direction of its long hood) that is either leading a train, most often a local, or part of a light power move

== M ==
Mainline (US)
A principal artery of a railway system
Main rod (US)
The drive rod connecting the crosshead to a driving-wheel or axle in a steam locomotive
Maintenance of way (MOW) (US)

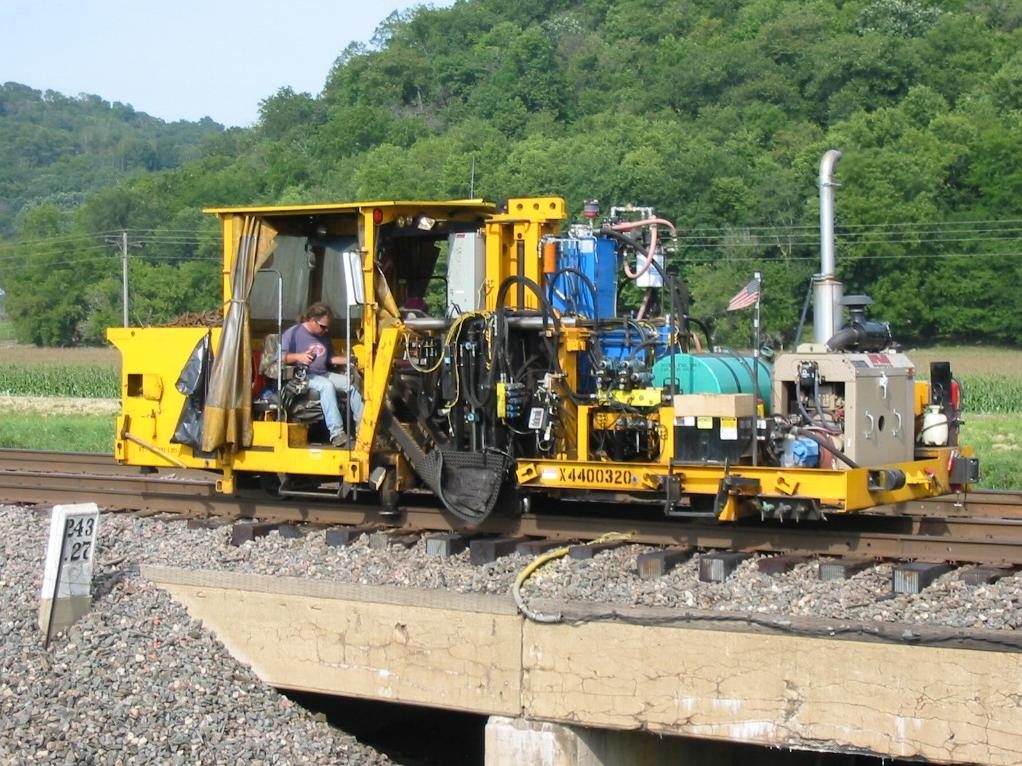
A spiker is an example of MOW equipment

The maintenance of a railroad's rights of way, including track
Manifest

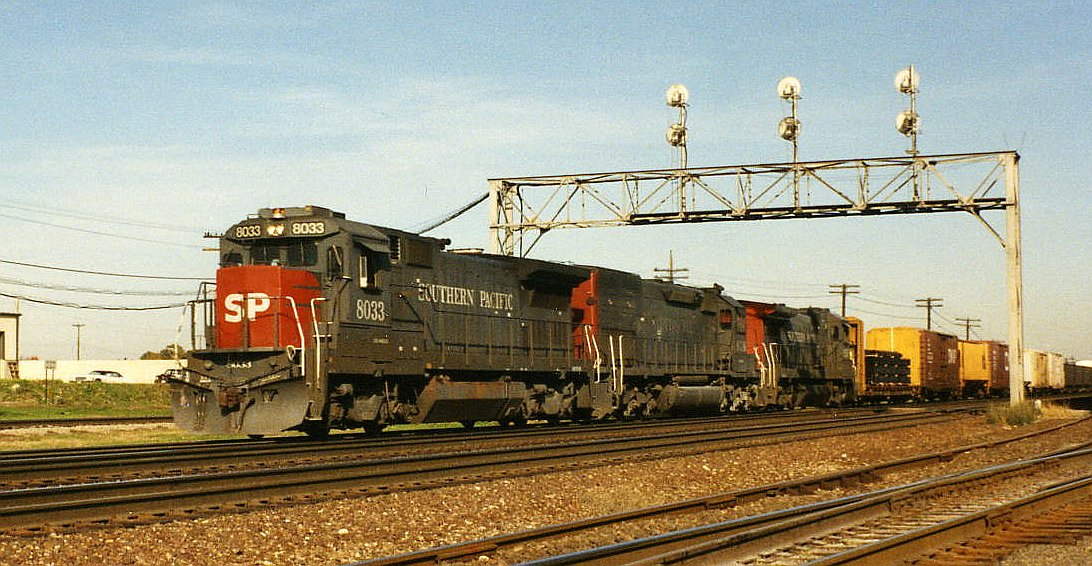
A westbound Southern Pacific manifest train

A freight train with a mixture of car types and cargoes. Also known as a Mixed Freight Train.
Mating Worms
The intertwined P and C letters of the Penn Central logo
Meatball or Swedish Meatball
Amtrak EMD AEM-7 or ABB ALP-44 electric locomotives; so named for their design being based on the Swedish Rc4.
Miniquad
Four permanently coupled ore cars (jennies)
Mother
A locomotive that is paired with a slug
Mud hop (US)
Someone who walks in the "mud" along the rails verifying car lineup
Mud Missile
A derogatory nickname given to GE Genesis locomotives, in reference to one's involvement in the 1993 Big Bayou Canot train disaster
Multimark
Named for the Canadian Pacific paint scheme given from 1968 to 1996
Multiple-unit train control (US)
The ability of diesel and electric locomotives or multiple units to be joined together and controlled from one driving station. Such a set of joined locomotives is called a consist or (colloquially) "lash-up" and is said to be "MUed together".

== N ==
NARP (US)
Acronym for the former name of the Rail Passengers Association, the National Association for Rail Passengers.
NIMBY (US)
A derisive acronym for "not in my backyard" describing residents who are opposed to trains running through their neighborhoods
NORAC (US)
The Northeast Operating Rules Advisory Committee is responsible for standardizing operations and signal rules and aspects among a variety of widely interconnected rail systems through the Northeastern region of the United States. Until 1999, Conrail was the largest system operator to follow NORAC rules. Properties formerly owned by Conrail have since modified wayside signal aspects to conform with individual company rules and aspect plans, until such time that replacement infrastructure is installed.

== O ==
Office-car special (OCS)
A train composed of passenger cars that are privately owned by the railroad corporation and which travels along their rail lines, so that upper level management can review facilities, assess the addition or reconstruction of facilities that are needed for expansion or modernization; as well as streamlining of operations or removal of obsolete infrastructure. Also, these trains are used to escort visiting upper level management from other railroads for the purpose of a proposed purchase or sale of a rail line.
One-man operation (OMO) (US)
Operation of a train by the driver or motorman alone, without a conductor
Outlawed
Train crew members who have reached their daily 12-hour maximum of hours worked and must cease working due to regulations
Owl-eyed Cars
An uncommon nickname for Pennsylvania Railroad's MP54s and related heavyweight MU cars, in reference to their distinctive porthole front windows that give the appearance of a pair of eyes when viewed from the front

== P ==
Pac-Man
A nickname for the Canadian Pacific Railway's 1968–1996 logo featuring a black triangle within a white half-circle, which resembles the main character of the video arcade game Pac-Man. It was CP's corporate logo for all business aspects: Railway (CP Rail), shipping (CP Ships), telecommunications (CNCP), trucking (CP Express), and airline (CP Air). It was officially known as the Multimark.
Passenger car (US)
Railway vehicle for use in passenger trains

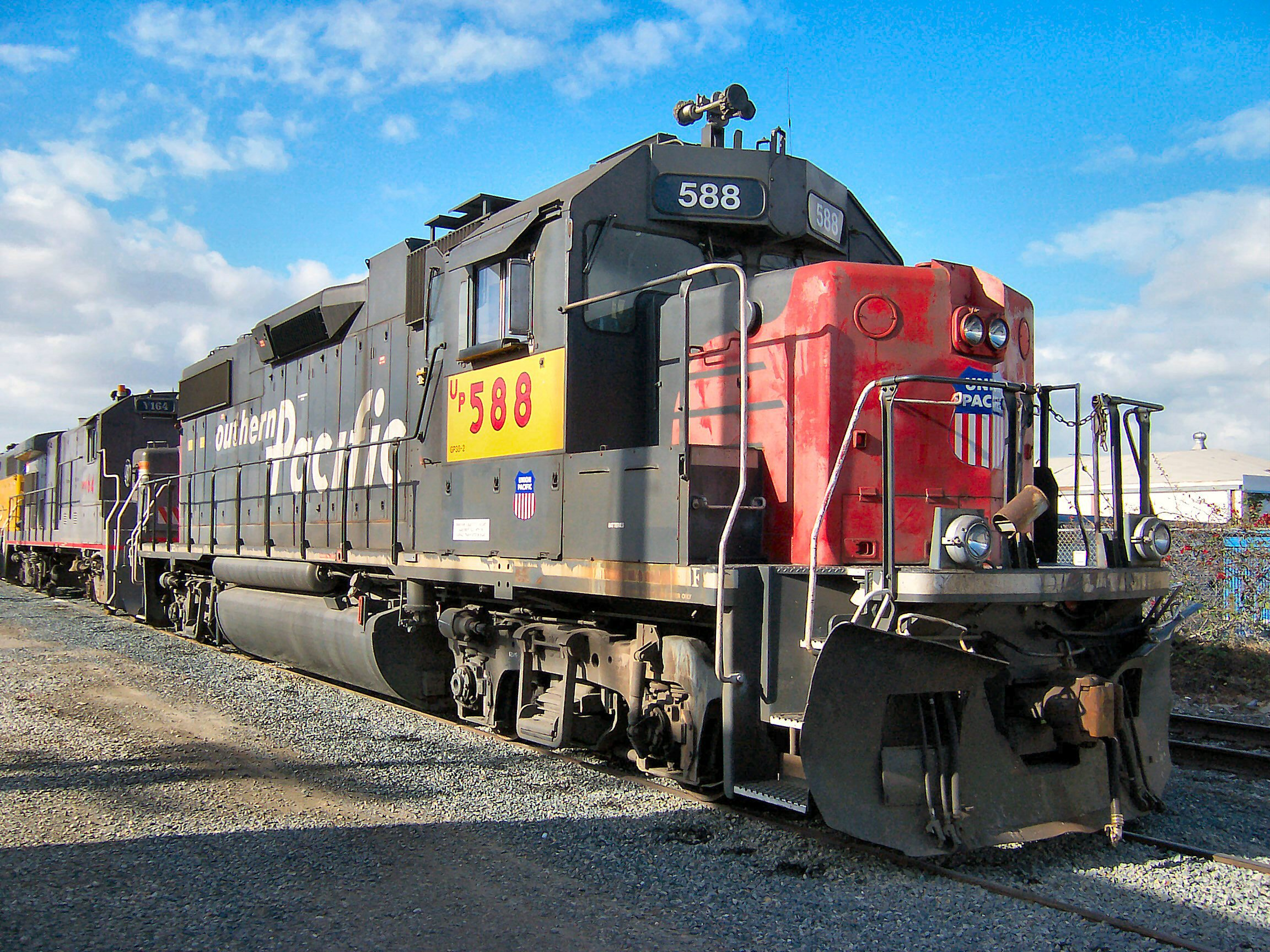
Union Pacific 588, formerly owned by Southern Pacific, showing a patch paint job of the new owner's reporting marks

Patch
A locomotive or car wearing a new reporting mark or number on a "patch" over existing paint, usually of the former owner's
Pepsi Can
An Amtrak GE Dash 8-32BWH, in reference to the units' original paint scheme with large red, white, and blue stripes.
Phase
The official names of Amtrak paint schemes used on its national network which are numbered sequentially.
Pig train
A train devoted exclusively to intermodal traffic, generally trailers on flatcars (TOFC) or containers on flatcars (COFC)
Plate (US)
The measurement of a freight car's vertical clearance. Plate F and above is considered excess height, and such cars must avoid low-clearance routes. See also: Loading gauge
Pole switching (also called "poling")

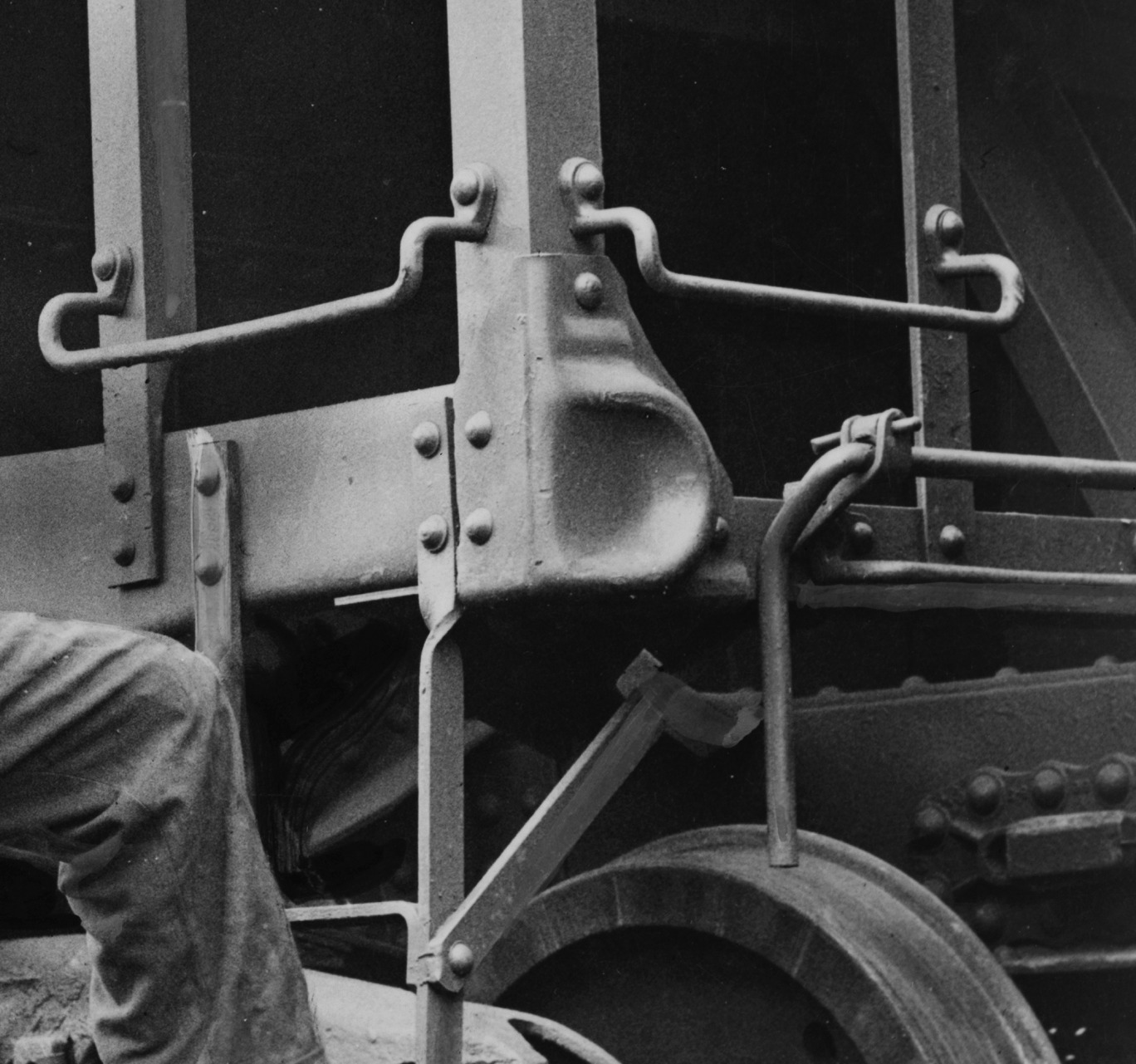
Detail of a photo showing the poling pocket on the corner of a freight car in the 1930s

A method of switching cars on adjacent tracks in which a pole is positioned between the locomotive and car, then the locomotive pushes the car using the pole. The pole is fitted into poling pockets on the locomotive and car to ensure it does not move during the switching maneuver.
Pooch
A nickname for the General Electric P30CH locomotives. So termed by the similar appearance of the model name to the word pooch: P30CH / POOCH.
Position light signal (Pennsylvania)
Signals made by the Pennsylvania Railroad that make use of a circular disc with up to eight lights mounted in a circle, with one light in the center. The lights would line up in a straight line to give the indication.
Power Move (PM)
When multiple locomotives move within a place to get to another without railcars
Private varnish (PV)
Privately owned passenger cars
Pumpkin
1. BNSF Railway's current bright orange paint scheme
2. CSX's or Amtrak's maintenance-of-way paint scheme
3. Formerly ICG's all-orange scheme

== Q ==
Q
Shorthand nickname for the Chicago, Burlington and Quincy Railroad (CB&Q)
Quarterly inspection, Q-inspection, or periodic inspection (US)
In the United States, a federally-mandated safety inspection performed on a locomotive every 92 operating days
Quiet zone (US)
A designation by the Federal Railroad Administration that removes the requirement for train operators to sound their horn when approaching each public crossing in a certain area, often near residential neighborhoods who have asked for the status. Because the train does not sound its horn while approaching the crossings, safety upgrades to all of the crossings must be made in order to compensate. These upgrades usually include double gates, additional signage, lights, and bells, if they are not already present. Additionally, the residents requesting the status must indemnify the railroad from any resulting crossing mishaps.

== R ==
Racetrack
1. A nickname for a busy Metra Commuter Rail line and BNSF freight line between Chicago and Aurora where commuter trains, Amtrak trains, and freight trains commonly attain high speeds.
2. The parallel tracks of the O&W and DL&W north of Norwich.
Raccoon
Norfolk Southern locomotives that have the entire area around the cab windows painted white, resembling the face of a raccoon
Racks
1. Autoracks
2. The portion of an autorack which is attached to a flatcar in order to protect the vehicles inside and may contain one, two, or three levels depending on the height of the vehicles being shipped
Rainbow consist, Skittles consist, or Skittles lineup
1. A group of locomotives of different colors or liveries leading a single train
2. A passenger train made up of cars bearing different liveries
Rare mileage
A passenger train traveling over track that does not have regular passenger service
Red Barn

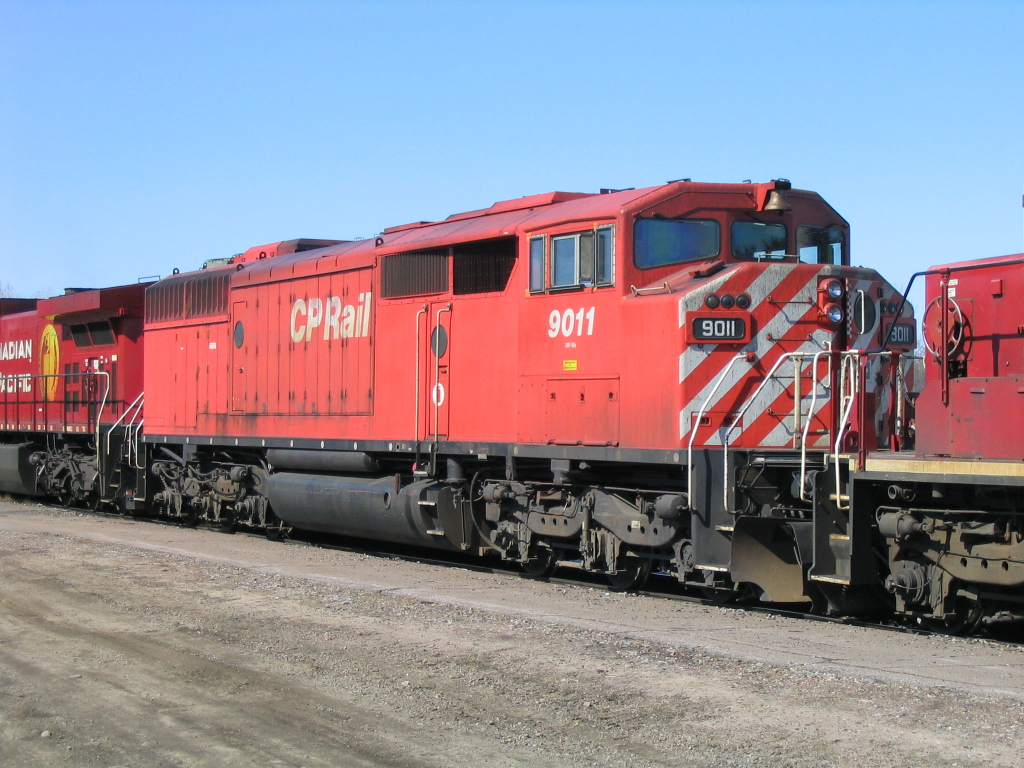
A CP SD40-2F Red Barn

Canadian Pacific's GMD SD40-2F locomotives
Reefer
A refrigerator car
Rent-a-wreck
A (usually old) locomotive owned by a leasing company
Reporting mark
A code assigned by the Association of American Railroads to identify the owners of rolling stock in North America
Restricted speed (US)
A speed not exceeding 20 mph which allows stopping within half the range of vision short of an obstruction on the tracks
Rhino
Nickname for HHP-8 electric locomotives used by Amtrak for Northeast Regional service
Right way
A "high nose" locomotive running with the long hood facing forward. Reminiscent of the Southern Railway and the Norfolk & Western style of running locomotives.
Right-of-way
The right-of-way (ROW) is the property owned or controlled by a railroad for purposes of transportation.
Road engine (US)
The locomotive closest to the train during a double-heading operation
Roll-by or rollby (US)
Visual inspection of railroad equipment while it is in motion
Rolling Bomb
A unit tank train usually carrying flammable liquids
Roster shooter
Someone interested in photographing every locomotive road number they can
Rule G (US)
The universal rule prohibiting the use of drugs and alcohol
Runaround (US)
The practice of detaching a locomotive from its train, driving it to the other end of the train and re-attaching it, to allow the train to proceed in the direction it has just come from (e.g. when it reaches its destination and forms a service in the other direction).
Run through
A train that originates on one railroad, with its destination on another road, that is simply "run through" to its destination instead of being exchanged for home road rolling stock at the crew-change point, in order to save expense
Running a red signal
An event in which a train passes a signal to stop without authorization to do so
Running boards or grating
Walkboards found on the tops and ends of rail cars

== S ==
Safety Appliance Act (US)
A law mandating air brakes, grab bars, and automatic couplers
Screamer or screaming thunderbox
An EMD F40PH locomotive, in reference to it operating in a constant state of full throttle (in order to provide head-end power to passenger cars).
Sergeant Stripes

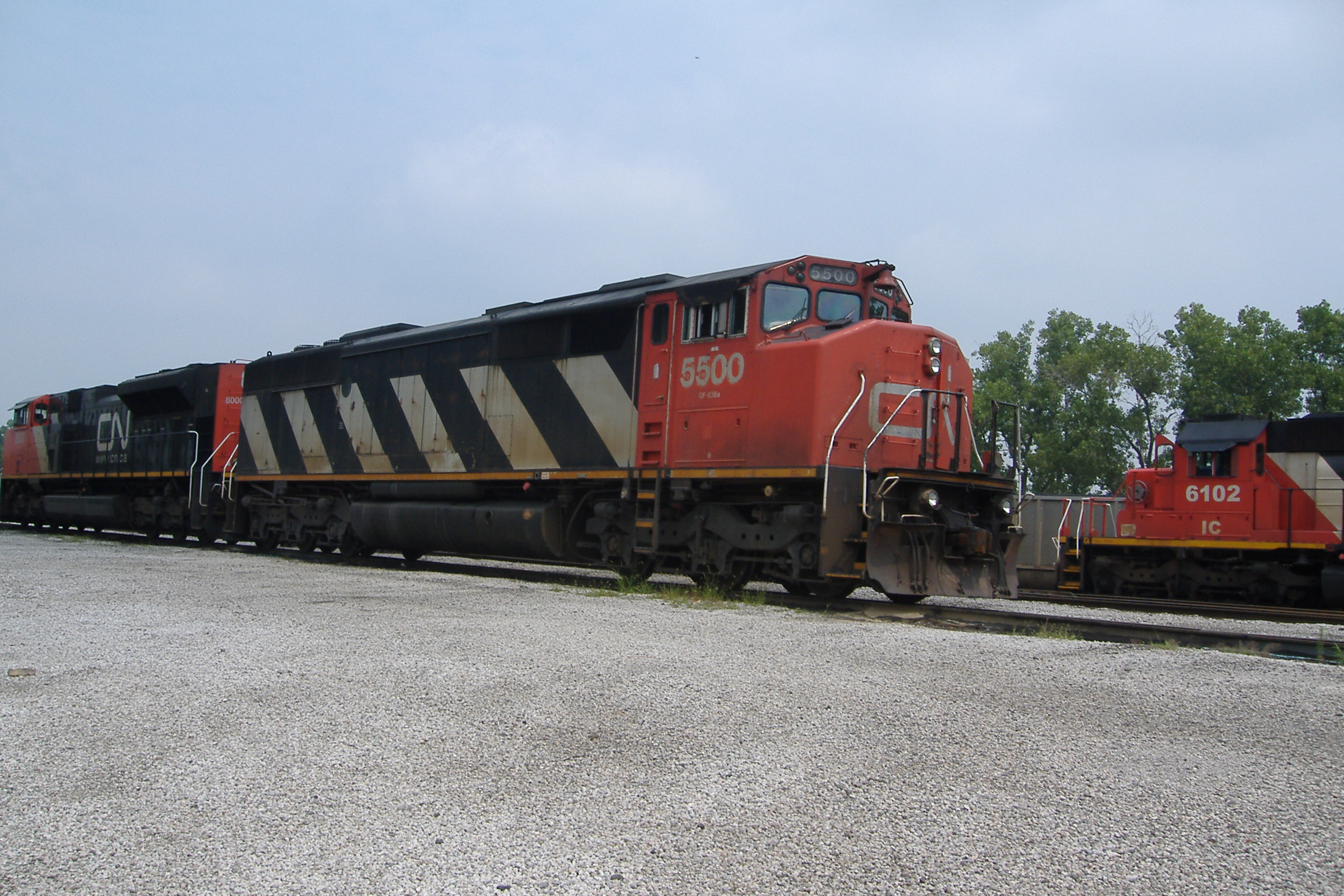
Canadian National EMD SD60F 5500 in the sergeant stripes paint scheme

A Canadian National locomotive in the 1970s and 1980s paint scheme featuring light-gray stripes on the locomotive's long hood
Shoofly (US)
A temporary stretch of track that takes trains around construction or an accident scene
Shove
To push a cut of cars backward with a locomotive
Shunting neck (US)
A length of track feeding a number of sidings that permits the sidings to be shunted without blocking the main line, or where two lines merge into one before ending with a buffer, to allow a run-round procedure to take place
Siding (US)
A second parallel track (running for a short distance) on single-track railway lines, allowing a train to pass another
Skate
A wheel chock
Slack action (US)
Looseness in a train caused by mating clearances in couplers
Slug
A locomotive, with or without an operator's cab, which lacks a diesel engine, and draws power for its traction motors from a normal locomotive, known as a "mate" or "mother"
Smokestack or stack (US)
A chimney
Snail
A locomotive with a diesel engine, but does not have traction motors, often used for external power for a rotary snow plow
Snake head
A section of strap rail that has come loose and curled upward due to the weight of railway cars passing over it
Speeder, motorcar, trackcar, putt putt, or golf cart

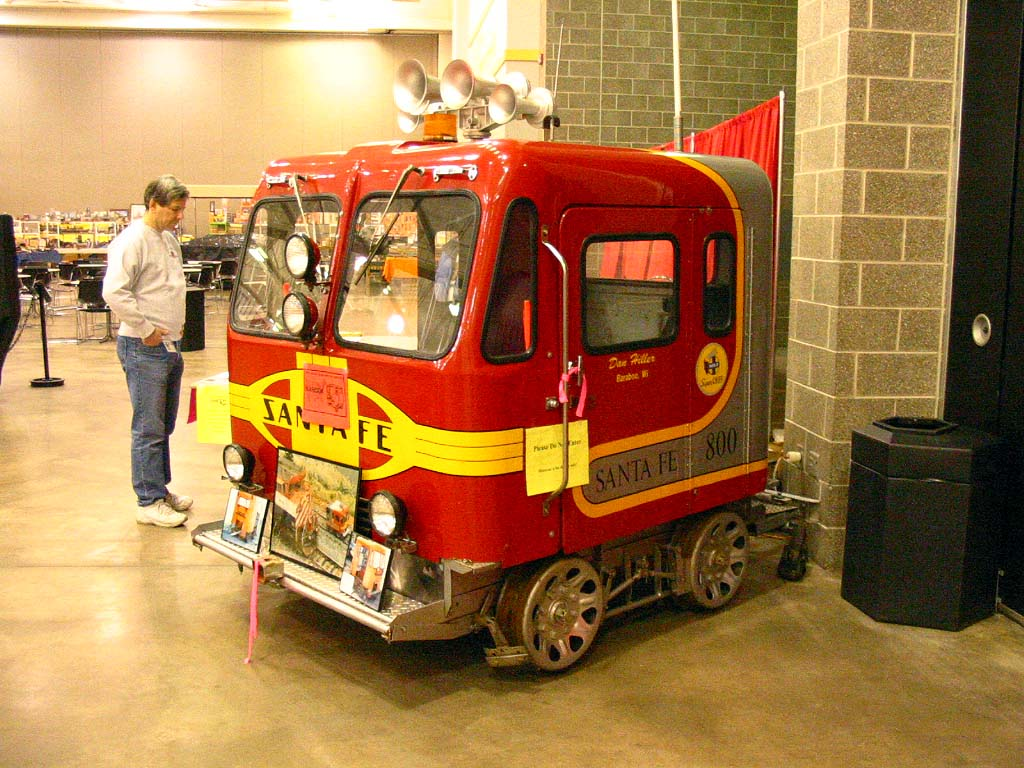
A privately owned speeder on display

A small, motorized track inspection vehicle
Spur (US)
A stretch of rail that branches off the main line, often to an industry that is serviced by freight trains
Stacks
A nickname for double-stacked cars or trains
Steeplecab (US)
An electric locomotive with a central cab and sloping "noses" on each end
Subway (US)
A railroad that runs underground, generally in a large city
Susie-Q (US)
A nickname for the New York, Susquehanna and Western Railway
Switch (US)
Points
Switcher locomotive (US)
A small locomotive used for assembling trains and moving railroad cars around

== T ==
The T (US)
A nickname for the Massachusetts Bay Transportation Authority (MBTA), the subway service through Boston, Massachusetts, also an old, but still-used official name for the Dallas/Fort Worth Transportation Authority
Taco Belle
A nickname for the new Southern Belle inspired paint scheme on Kansas City Southern locomotives assigned to subsidiary Kansas City Southern de México
Terminal station (US)
A station sited where a railway line or service ends or terminates
Thundercab
A mostly derogatory nickname given to early-build SD70ACe locomotives, due to crews considering their cabs noisy
Tie (US)

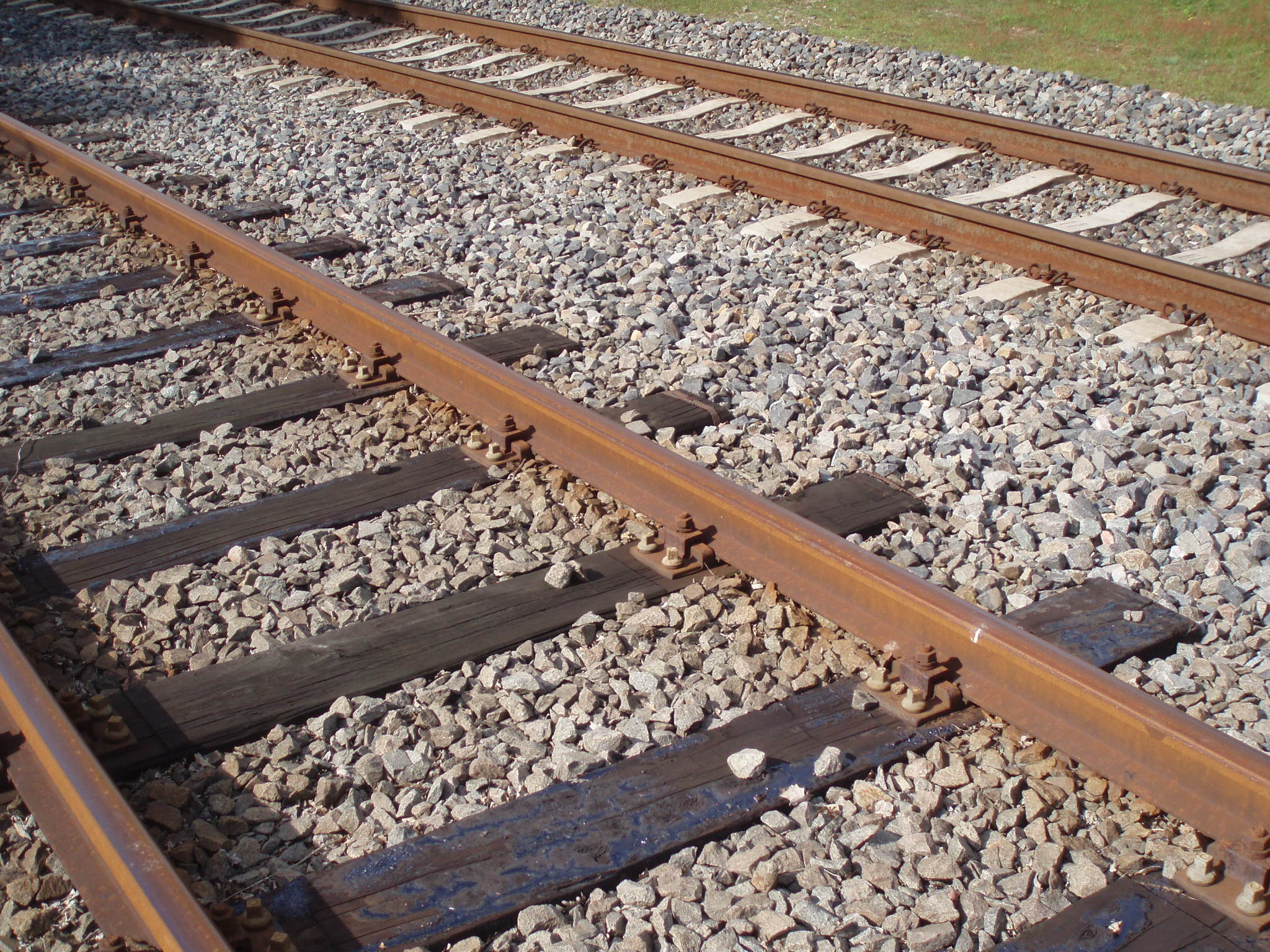
Wood (left track) and concrete (right track) ties beneath the rails

Bars of wood or concrete placed beneath and perpendicular to track to support the rails
Tie down
To apply hand brakes to the trainset
Tie plate (US)
An iron or steel plate used to spread the weight of rail over a larger area of sleeper (tie) and facilitate a secure, low maintenance, fastening with bolts or clips
Toaster

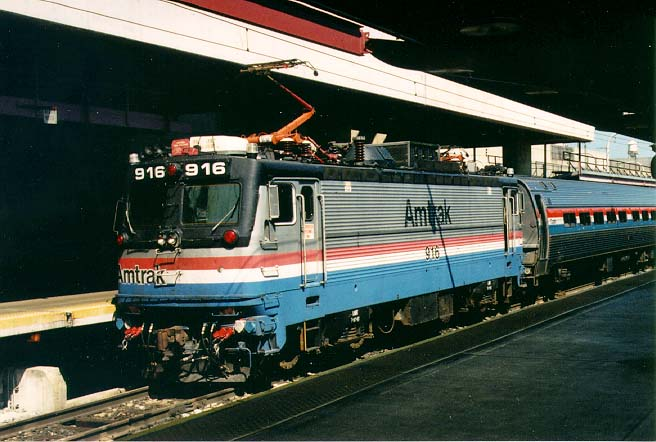
An Amtrak AEM-7, sometimes called a toaster due to its boxy shape

EMD AEM-7 and ABB ALP-44 locomotives, due to their visual appearance and tendency to emit sparking and clicking sounds when idling. Also sometimes used to refer to any GE locomotive, due both to their tendency to shoot flames out of the exhaust stack during turbo lag and to General Electric's historic involvement in the manufacture of household appliances.
Torpedo (US)
A small explosive device strapped to the top of a rail to alert an approaching train of danger ahead by creating a loud noise upon contact with a locomotive wheel
Toupee
When a single stack train coming from reduced clearance territory has additional containers placed on top for the rest of its trip; the opposite of filet
Trackage rights (US)
The legal right of one railroad company to use the tracks of another, as agreed to by the companies concerned or their predecessors
Track warrant (TWC) (US) or occupancy control system (OCS) (CA)
A system for authorizing main track occupancy using defined points such as mileposts, switches, or stations
Train order (US)
A system for authorizing main track occupancy using telephone, telegraph, and wayside stations to pass authority to train crews
Triclops
A name given by railfans to locomotives, most notably EMD SD60s, with three front windows.
Trops
Tropicana reefer boxcar. Shortened from Tropicana, referring to the orange or white refrigerated boxcars used to haul frozen concentrated orange juice to packaging facilities north of Florida. Term is specifically used by CSX crews in Cincinnati Terminal where a large such packaging facility is located.
Truck
The undercarriage assembly of rolling stock incorporating the train wheels, suspension, brakes and, in powered units, the traction motors
Tunnel Motor
Southern Pacific EMD SD40T-2 or EMD SD45T-2. Named for the lower-located air intakes to prevent the locomotive from pulling diesel exhaust in with clean air while traveling through a tunnel.
Turn
A local freight train that makes a round trip, returning to originating station

== U ==
U-Boat
A GE Universal Series locomotive
Underliers
Non-operating railroad companies which own rights-of-way
Unit Train
A unit train, also called a block train or a trainload service, is a train in which all cars (wagons) carry the same commodity and are shipped from the same origin to the same destination, without being split up or stored en route.
UP (US)
The common name and reporting mark for the Union Pacific Railroad
Union station or union terminal (US)

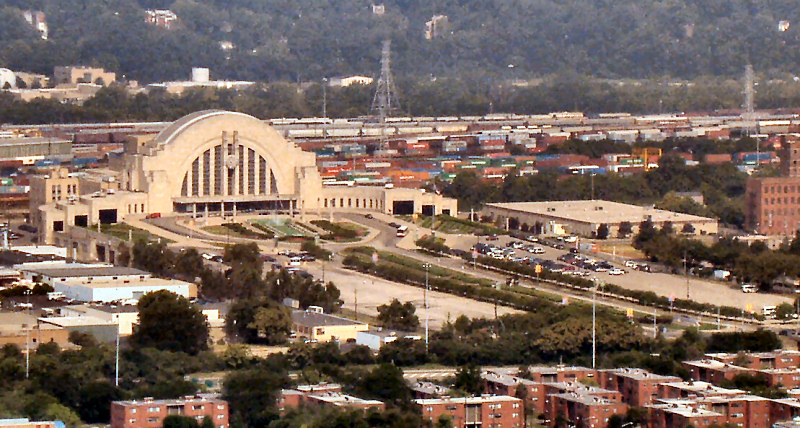
The main concourse building and façade of Cincinnati Union Terminal

A railway station or terminal at which tracks and facilities are shared by two or more railway companies

== V ==
Vomit Bonnet
A derogatory name for BNSF's first attempt at a paint scheme, which used olive and beige as its principal colors but in the configuration of the traditional AT&SF "Warbonnet" scheme, first seen on SD70MAC 9647.

== W ==
Warbonnet

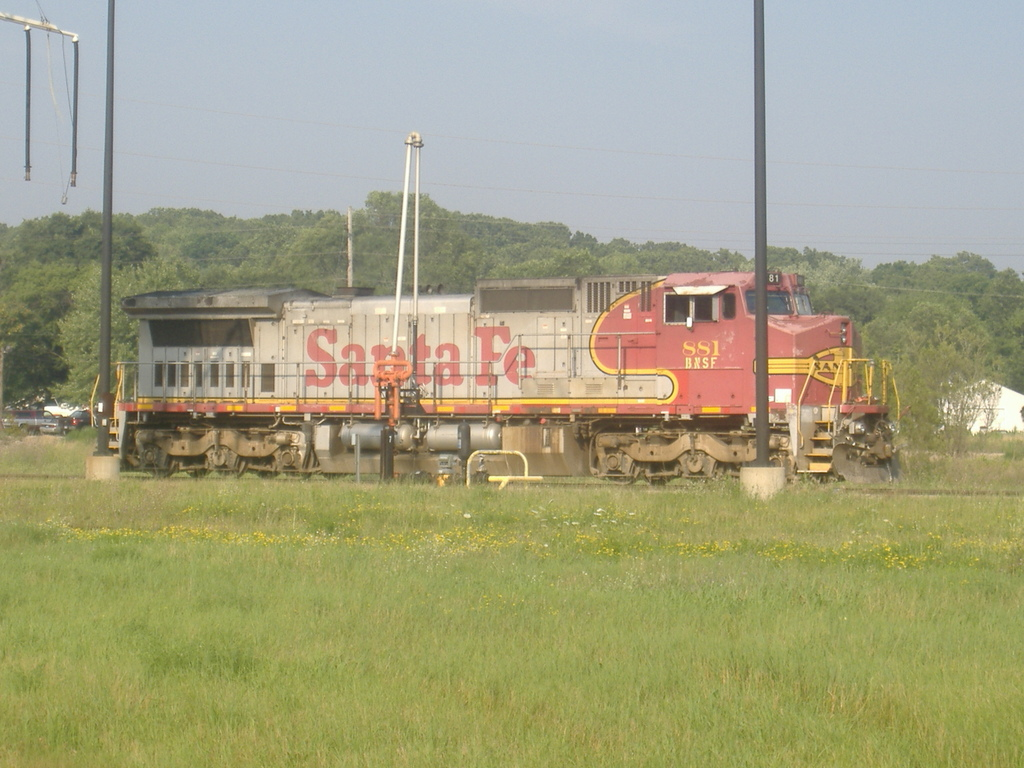
Santa Fe Dash 8 #881 at CN's Battle Creek fueling depot, displaying the modern interpretation of the classic red and silver warbonnet livery

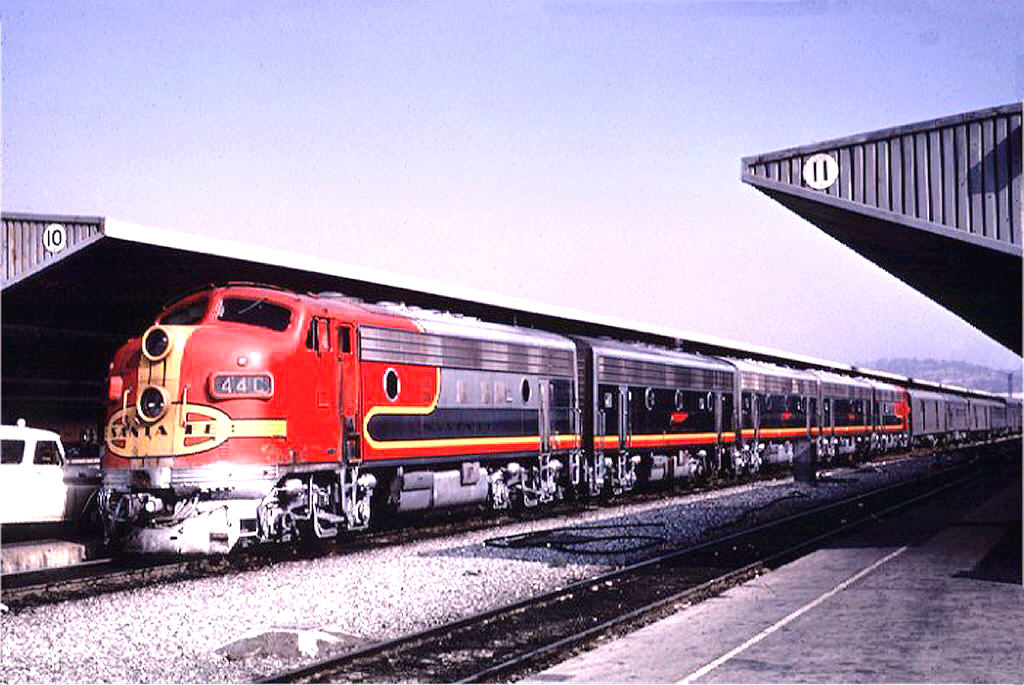
The combined Super Chief/El Capitan passenger train at Los Angeles Union Passenger Terminal in 1966 showing the red and silver warbonnet livery

Santa Fe's red and silver paint scheme. The scheme first appeared in 1937 on the railroad's E1 passenger locomotives for the Super Chief train. It is widely considered the most famous and the most recognizable of railroad color schemes. The Santa Fe phased out its use from the early 1970s on, then revived it in 1989. It has become less common since the BNSF Railway merger in 1995.
Washboards
M.U. cars, subway cars, and other equipment made with corrugated side panels that resembled washboards
Water column (US)
A device used for delivering a large volume of water into the tank or tender of a steam locomotive
Waybill
A document giving details and instructions relating to a shipment of goods. A waybill is issued by the railroad after receipt of the Bill Of Lading.
Whiteface
A high-visibility paint scheme used on various Burlington Northern locomotives, primarily SD60Ms, SD40-2s, GP50s, GP39 rebuilds, and GP28 rebuilds.
Wickerliners
A nickname for the DL&W electric multiple unit cars because of their wicker lined seats
Worms in love (US)
A name for the logo of the former Penn Central Railroad logo which combined the letters P and C into a single monogram.
Wye (US)

A wye

Three railroad tracks in a triangular form with switches at all three corners, can be used to turn a train around

== X ==
X-ing (US)

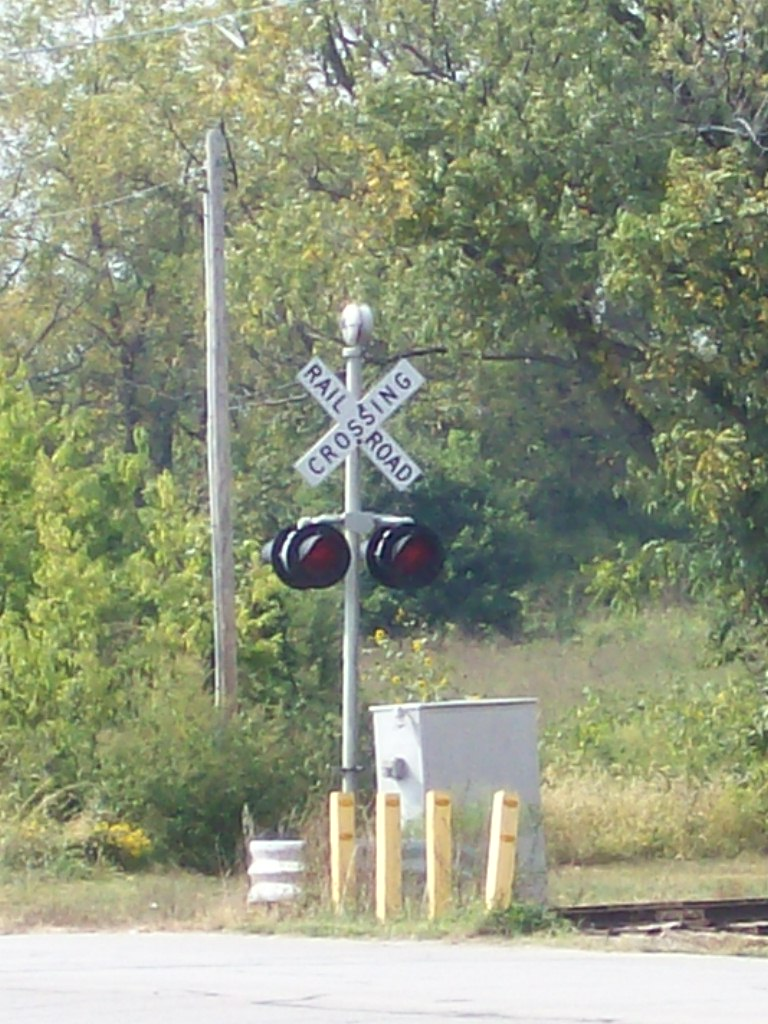
A X-ing sign

Crossing

== Y ==
Yellowbonnet
One of two Santa Fe paint schemes. The standard freight scheme from 1972 until the BNSF merger was dark blue with yellow on the front, with the same color division as the warbonnet scheme. It is also known as Bluebonnet. Yellowbonnet can also mean a warbonnet unit with only the red painted over, resulting in a silver and yellow locomotive; this was used on passenger engines transferred to freight service after the formation of Amtrak.
YN1
CSX's first yellow-nose paint scheme; gray overall with dark blue on the top half of the cab and yellow on the front of the nose; blue "CSX" lettering
YN2

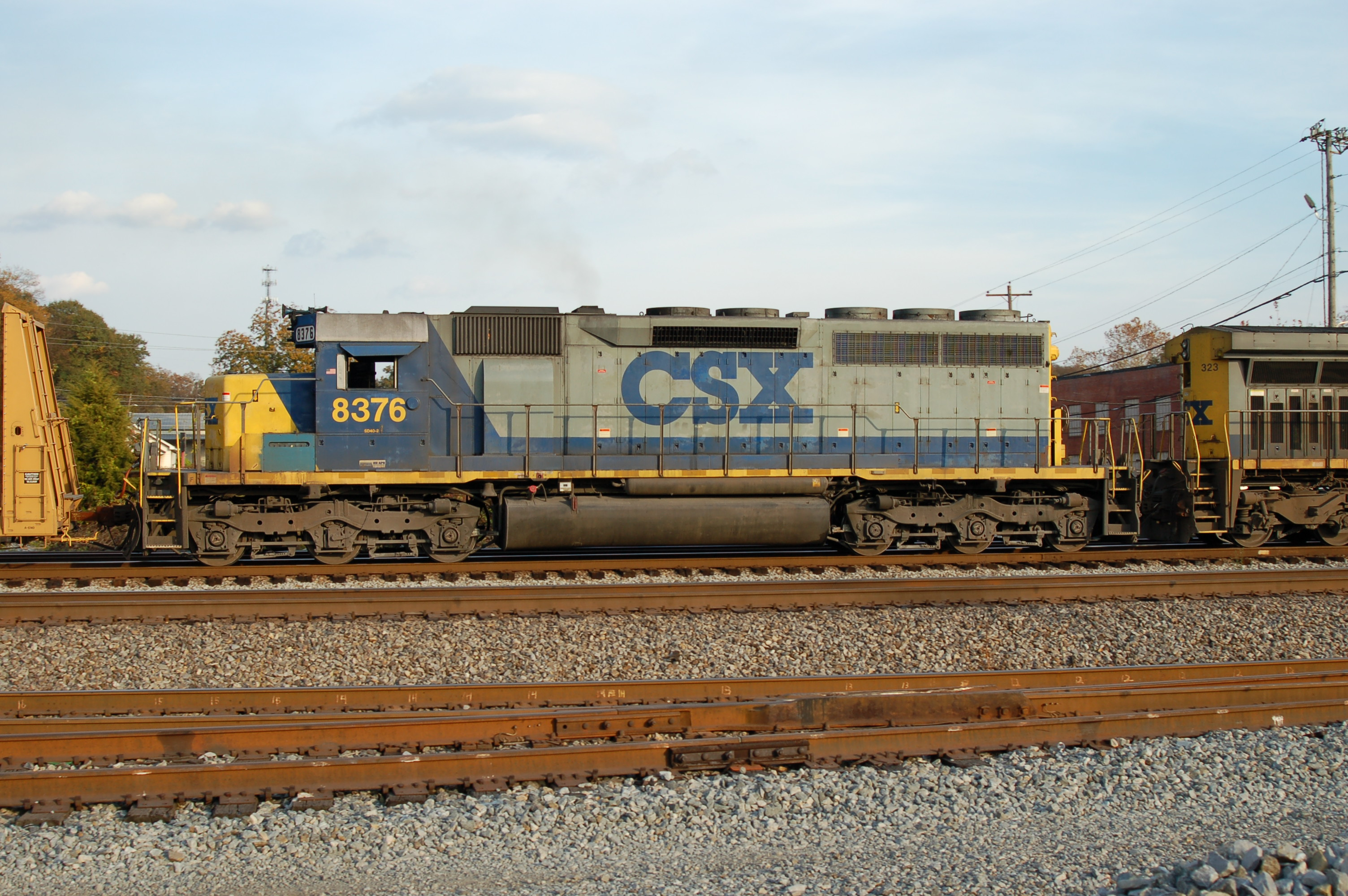
A CSX unit wearing the YN2 paint scheme

CSX's second yellow-nose paint scheme; more yellow on the nose; the whole cab is dark blue, along with a stripe on the side; blue or yellow "CSX" lettering

== Z ==
Zebra Stripes
A Santa Fe locomotive in the early black scheme with white warning stripes. CN Rail has also used this scheme on earlier locomotives.
Z-Train
A high-priority intermodal train. This term comes from the internal designation systems of the BNSF and Union Pacific, with 'Z' being assigned to the highest priority traffic on their networks.

== See also ==
- Glossary of Australian railway terms
- Glossary of New Zealand railway terms
- Glossary of rail transport terms
- Glossary of United Kingdom railway terms
- Passenger rail terminology
