= Rule G =

Prohibition against railroad employees working while intoxicated

Rule G is a prohibition against railroad employees working while intoxicated. It was originally a near-universal provision of individual railroads' operating rules, and is now part of the universal code of the Association of American Railroads.

In addition to prohibiting the use or possession of drugs and alcohol, the rule also provides for "reasonable suspicion", wherein a rail carrier may require an employee to submit to a breathalyzer or urine test if he is suspected of being under the influence. A refusing employee is considered to be in violation and may be suspended or terminated with no further procedure.
