= GMD SD40-2F =

Diesel-electric locomotive

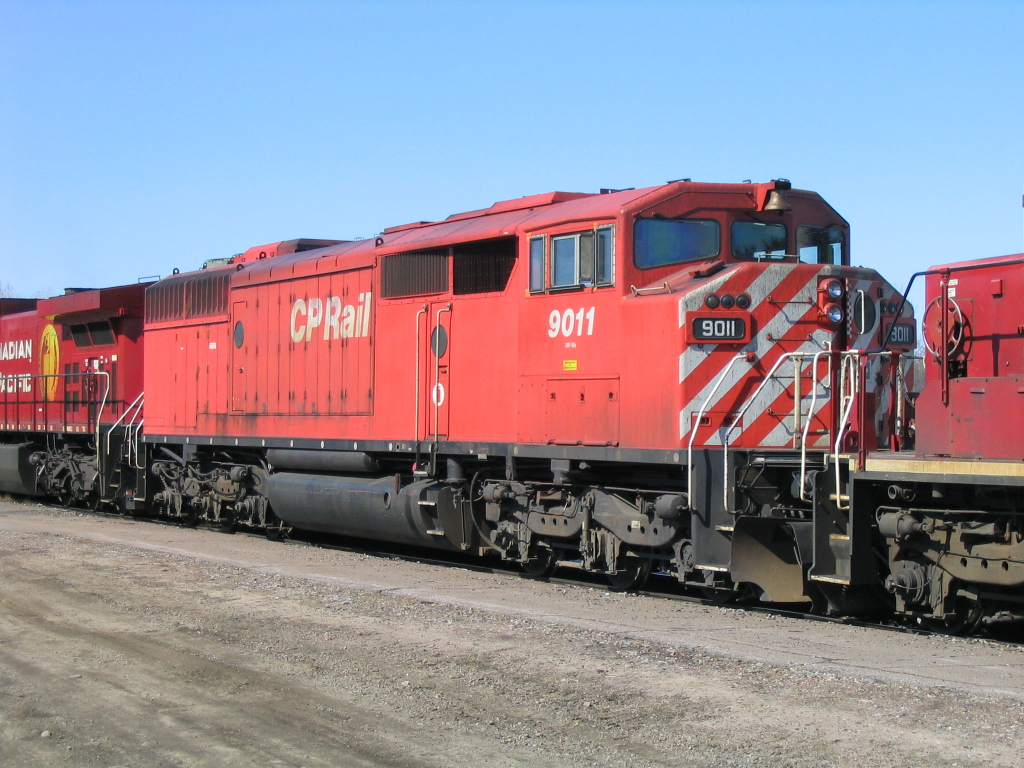
- CP 9011 in Chalk River, Ontario
Type and origin
- Power type: Diesel–electric
- Builder: General Motors Diesel (GMD)
- Order number: 25
- Model: SD40-2F
- Build date: 1988
- Total produced: 25
- Rebuild date: 2021 for 9024, and 2010 for 9010,
- Number rebuilt: 2
Specifications
- Configuration
  - AAR: C-C
  - UIC: Co′Co′
  - Commonwealth: Co-Co
- Gauge: 4 ft 8 1/2 in (1,435 mm)
- Trucks: HTC 6-Wheel
- Wheel diameter: 40 in (1,000 mm)
- Minimum curve: 30°
- Wheelbase: 13 ft 7 in (4,140 mm) between axles in each truck
- Pivot centres: 43 ft 6 in (13,260 mm) between bolsters
- Length
  - Over couplers: 68 ft 10 in (20,980 mm)
- Width: 10 ft 3 1/8 in (3,127 mm) over the grabirons
- Height: 15 ft 7 1/8 in (4,753 mm)
- Loco weight: 368,000 lb (167,000 kg) or 184 short tons (164 long tons; 167 t)
- Fuel type: Diesel
- Fuel capacity: 3,200–4,000 US gal (12,000–15,000 L; 2,700–3,300 imp gal)
- Lubricant cap.: 395 US gal (1,500 L; 329 imp gal)
- Coolant cap.: 275 US gal (1,040 L; 229 imp gal)
- Sandbox cap.: 56 ft^{3} (1,600 L)
- Prime mover: EMD 16-645E3
- RPM
  - RPM idle: 318
  - Maximum RPM: 904
- Engine type: V16 diesel engine
- Aspiration: turbocharged
- Alternator: GMD14
- Generator: Main: AR10; Auxiliary: Delco A8102
- Traction motors: 6
- Cylinders: 16
- Cylinder size: 9.02 in (229 mm) x 10 in (250 mm)
- Gear ratio: 62:15
- MU working: Yes; AAR
- Train brakes: Westinghouse 26L (Air Brake)
Performance figures
- Maximum speed: 65 mph (105 km/h)
- Power output: 3,000 hp (2,200 kW)
- Tractive effort
  - Starting: 115,000 lbf (52,000 kgf; 510 kN) @ 31.5%
  - Continuous: 82,100 lbf (37,200 kgf; 365 kN) @ 11 mph (18 km/h)
Career
- Operators: Canadian Pacific, Central Maine and Quebec Railway
- Numbers: 9000–9024 (Same number for both railroads)
- Nicknames: Red barn
- Locale: Canada
- Delivered: 1988 – 1989
- Retired: 2012-2019
- Scrapped: 2012-
- Disposition: All units retired by CP. 10 sold & later reacquired by CP in 2020 from CMQ Purchase, remainder presumed scrapped. One unit (9024) converted to a hydrogen fuel cell locomotive.

CP 9000 on a train somewhere in Quebec.

The GMD SD40-2F is a 3,000 horsepower (2,200 kW) C-C diesel locomotive built by General Motors Diesel. It was fundamentally an SD40-2 in a cowl unit full-width body. A total of 25 units were built solely for the Canadian Pacific Railway. They were delivered in 1988 and 1989, after the end of production for the regular SD40-2. The engines were CP's only cowl units, and have been nicknamed "Red Barns" by railfans.

The locomotives are numbered 9000-9024. These were the only new locomotives to be delivered to the CPR in the "Action Red" paint scheme, a variation upon the "Multimark" paint scheme lacking the black-and-white emblem. Two engines, numbers 9000 and 9022, have been repainted in the "Dual Flags" paint scheme. They were delivered without the porthole in the nose door; this was retrofitted to most units in the early 1990s.

On December 13, 2012, CP retired SD40-2F units 9000, 9002, 9005, 9010, 9016, 9018, 9019, 9022, and 9024. (along with the 9000, 9001, and 9018,) had been involved in a June 9, 2009 derailment in Oshawa, Ontario, on CP's Belleville Sub. By late 2016, CP retired all of the remaining units.

In 2015, the Central Maine and Quebec Railway acquired 10 of these engines from CP, five years before the CM&Q itself was merged and incorporated into CP. The new start up railway purchased the 9004, 9010, 9011, 9014, 9017, 9020, 9021, 9022, 9023, and the 9024. All were repainted within two years into CMQ's silver and light blue livery except for 9017, which was repainted into the black, red, and gray paint scheme of the Bangor & Aroostook Railroad in recognition of the heritage of some of CMQ's trackage in Maine. In 2020, Canadian Pacific acquired the CMQ, thus reacquiring the SD40-2F units that were sold 5 years prior.

== Accident ==
In 2010, CP 9015 crashed into a truck carrying crude oil and was badly burnt. The unit was rebuilt afterwards.

== Hydrogen unit ==
A SD40-2F "Red Barn" somewhere on a CP grain train most likely.

In 2021, CP announced the conversion of an SD40-2F (unit 9024) to a hydrogen fuel cell locomotive numbered 1001, classified as an H2OEL.

== See also ==
- List of GMD Locomotives
