= Long hood =

Aft compartment of a diesel locomotive

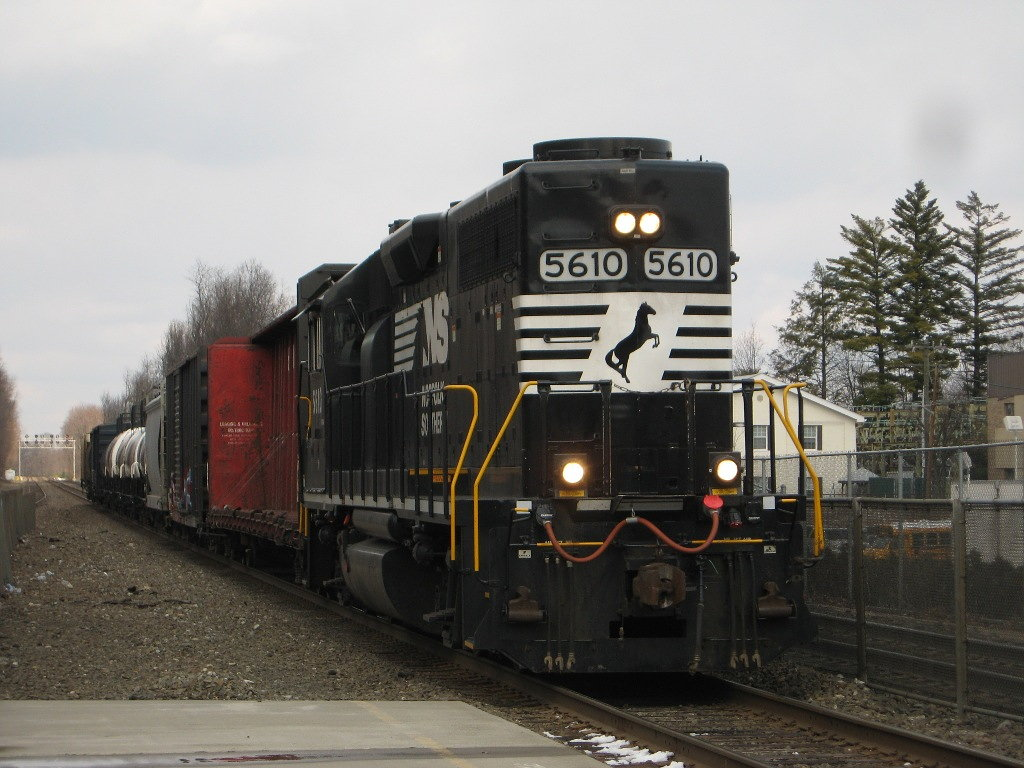
A Norfolk Southern EMD GP38-2 operating long hood forward through Ridgewood, New Jersey.

The long hood of a hood unit-style diesel locomotive is, as the name implies, the longer of the two hoods (narrower sections of the locomotive body in front and behind of the cab) on a locomotive, particularly American-type freight locomotives.

== Equipment ==
The long hood normally contains the diesel engine (prime mover), the main generator or alternator, the locomotive's cooling radiators, the dynamic brake resistor grids if fitted, and most of the locomotive's auxiliary equipment. Head-end power equipment, if fitted, is normally in the long hood; steam generators for heating older passenger cars may be either in the long or short hoods.

== Operating direction ==
Normally, the long hood is the rear of the locomotive. For early hood unit models, this was not the case; railroads preferred to run with the long hood at the front and the cab at the rear (referred to as operating long hood forward or LHF). This is a holdover from the steam era of railroads where almost all locomotives were built with the cab placed at the rear of the locomotive. It is a common misconception that locomotives were run LHF to provide greater protection, although it may have been a secondary benefit. Southern Railway and Norfolk and Western Railway operated their locomotives bidirectionally to make coal shifting more efficient. By putting the engineer on the right side with the Long Hood Forward, the engineer could see signals down the long hood and around the short hood for operations in both directions. Later, preferences changed to having the short hood at the front and the long hood at the rear for better visibility and with the advent of Wide, or Comfort cabs. Visibility became a deciding factor when more powerful engines required larger, wider radiators that blocked a larger portion of the field of view.

=== United States ===
The railroads that held out the longest for long-hood leading were the Norfolk and Western Railway and the Southern Railway (later merged into the Norfolk Southern Railway). When Southern Railway received their first EMD GP7s, they were delivered with a high short hood, and Southern Railway pointed the locomotive LHF for crew safety. After the first GP7s hit the Southern Railway System, subsequent locomotives were ordered with the high short hood and the long hood designated (starting after the SD45 order) as the front. Here is a list of each locomotive Southern ordered with a high short hood, and operated LHF.

==== General Motors Electro-Motive Division ====
- GP7
- GP9
- GP18
- GP38
- GP38-2
- EMD GP40
- GP40X (SOU 7000-7002)
- GP49 (SOU 4600-4605)
- GP50 (SOU 7003-7092)
- SD7
- SD9
- SD35
- SD40
- SD40-2
- SD45

(note: the SD50 and the GP59 are the first units ordered with the low, short hood, and pointed LHF)

==== General Electric Transportation Systems ====
- B30-7
- U23B
- B23-7
- U30C
- U30B
- U33C

==== American Locomotive Company ====
- ALCO RS-11
- ALCO RSD-7
- ALCO RSD-12
- ALCO RSD-15

The Norfolk and Western Railway (NW) operated as Southern Railway did, with the long hood toward the front; the only difference between NW locomotives and Southern locomotives was the position of the bell. NW had the bell on the short hood while Southern had the bell on the long hood.

Many early diesel locomotive builders designated the long hood end of their road switchers as the front. Examples include models manufactured by the American Locomotive Company and Baldwin Locomotive Works.

Long hood forward is a fading practice in many countries. Most modern locomotives produced in the USA feature wide-nose Canadian comfort cabs with desktop style controls, which bar the ability to operate the unit long hood forward because the desktop style prevents the engineer from turning in his or her chair to face the other end of the locomotive.

=== Great Britain ===
The term 'long hood forward' is not used in Britain, as the hood would be described as a "bonnet" or "engine compartment". Most British diesel locomotives have a cab at each end, so the term does not apply. Where a single-cab design was used, it was designed to be operated long hood forward, but, in practice, it might operate in either direction, like a steam tank locomotive. Apart from shunters, the only single-cab class still in service in Britain is the class 20. These are now usually operated cab forward (often in pairs) to give the driver a better view of the track ahead, while some have been fitted with nose-mounted video cameras for use when working long hood forward.

=== Philippines ===
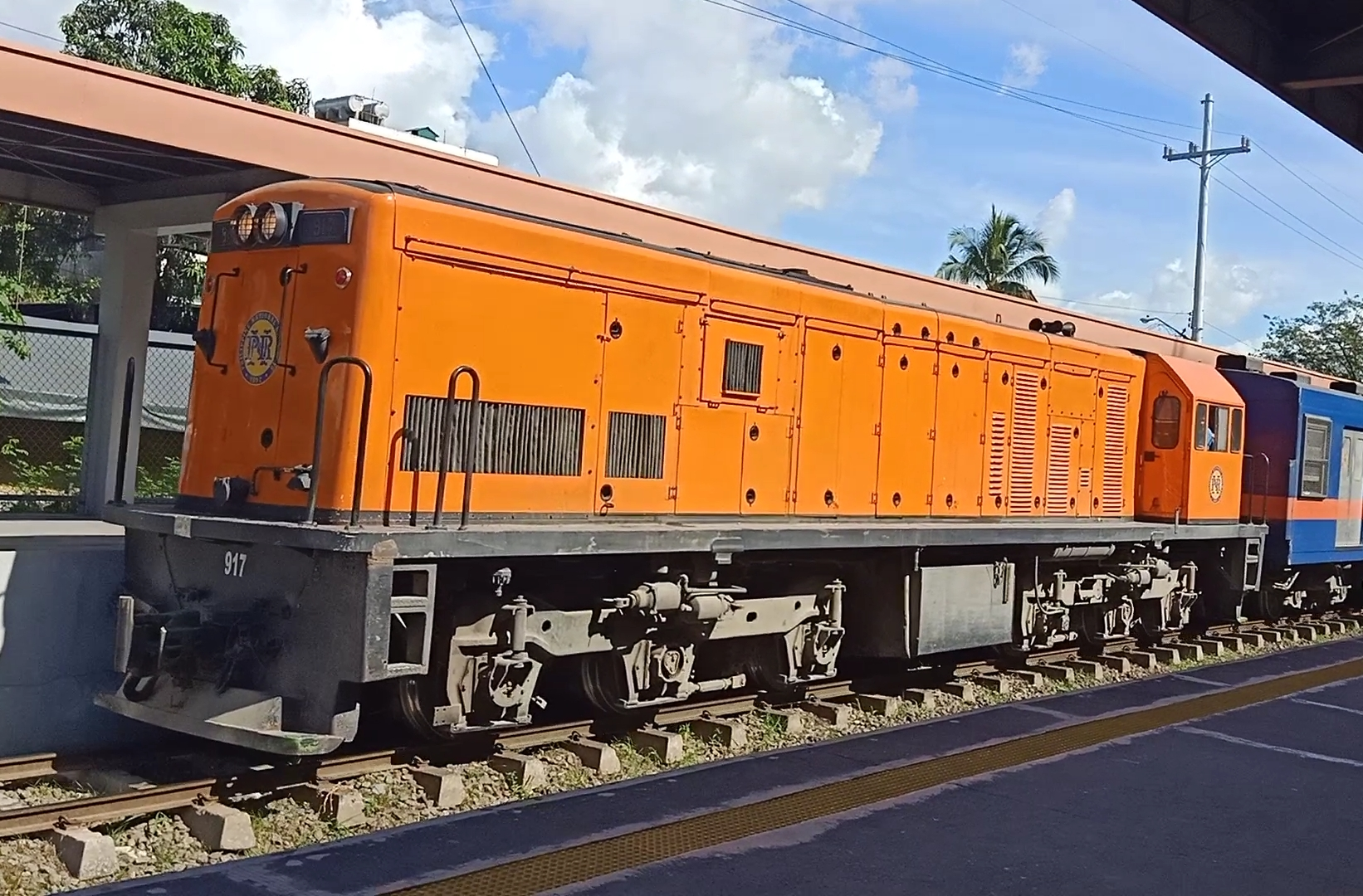
PNR 900 class 917 running in Long hood forward at España

Philippine National Railways is operating long hood forward on their locomotives on passenger operations depending on what direction the locomotive is facing.

=== Indonesia ===
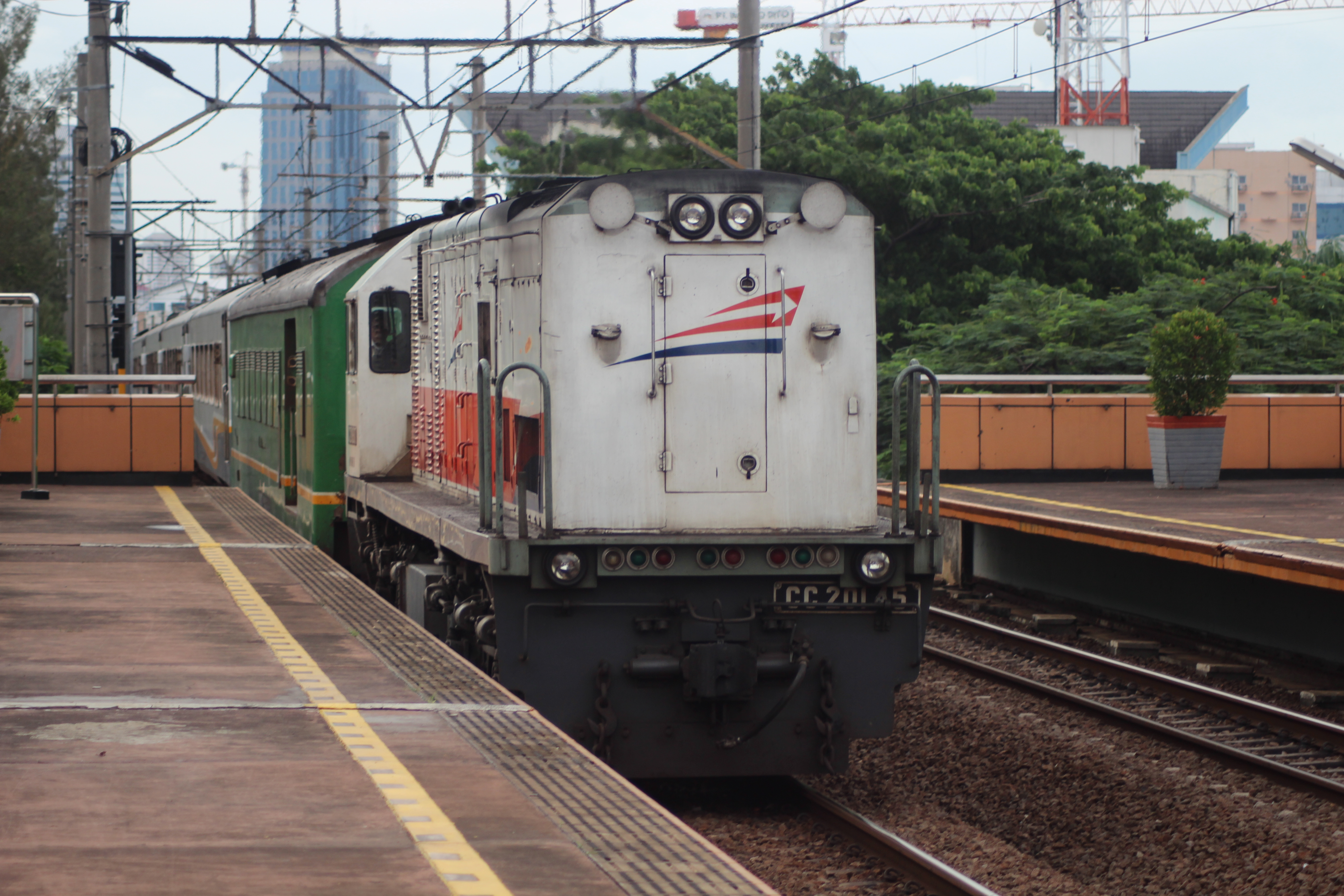
A CC 201 45 (CC 201 83 07) operating long hood forward with Argo Dwipangga train through Cikini Station.

PT Kereta Api Indonesia formerly operated locomotives long hood forward for both passenger & freight operations. It now operates most trains short hood forward for safety reasons, but at least one train still runs long hood forward.

== See also ==
- Short hood
