= EMD GP59 =

Locomotive class

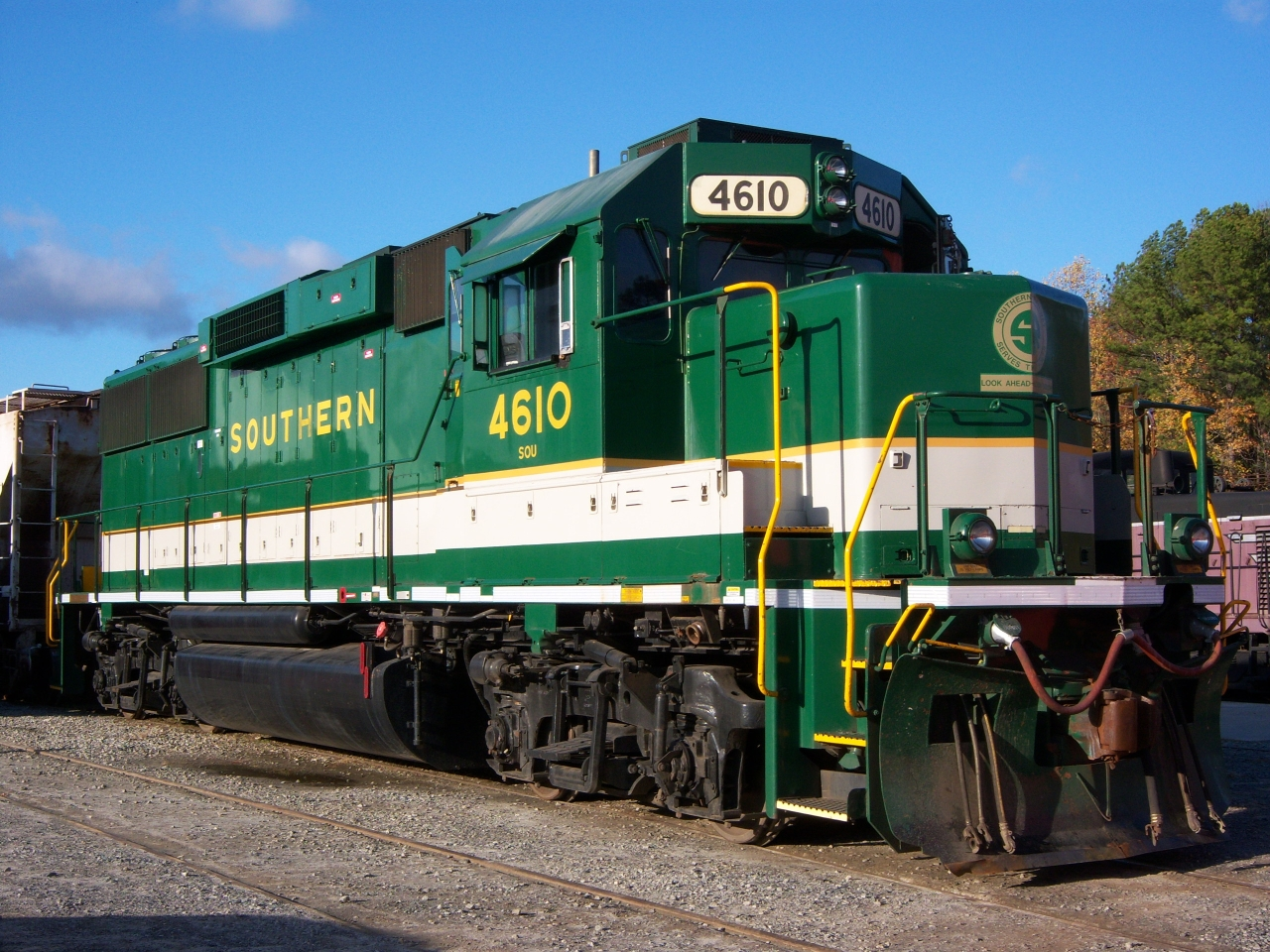
- SOU 4610, owned by Norfolk Southern. This unit has since been repainted into standard NS colors.
Type and origin
- Power type: Diesel-electric
- Builder: General Motors Electro-Motive Division (EMD)
- Model: GP59
- Build date: 1985 – 1989
- Total produced: 36
Specifications
- Configuration
  - AAR: B-B
  - UIC: Bo'Bo'
- Gauge: 4 ft 8 1/2 in (1,435 mm) standard gauge
- Length: 59 ft 9 in (18.21 m)
- Fuel capacity: 3,700 US gal (14,000 L; 3,100 imp gal)
- Prime mover: EMD 12-710G3A
- Engine type: V12 diesel
- Cylinders: 12
Performance figures
- Power output: 3,000 hp (2,200 kW)

The EMD GP59 is a 4-axle diesel locomotive model built by General Motors Electro-Motive Division between 1985 and 1989. Power was provided by a 12-cylinder EMD 710G3A diesel engine, which could produce 3,000 horsepower (2,200 kW). This locomotive shared the same common frame with the EMD GP60, giving it an overall length of 59 feet 9 inches (18.21 m). It featured a 3,700-US-gallon (14,000 L; 3,100 imp gal) fuel tank. 36 examples of this locomotive were built including three demonstrators. Norfolk Southern placed the only order for the GP59 and also acquired the three demonstrators which featured an aerodynamic cab.

By adding a comfort cab, a full cowl body, and an HEP generator, the GP59 became the EMD F59PH.

In 2011 Norfolk Southern began a program to upgrade their fleet of GP59s, the only GP59s operating anywhere. The first one was not released until March 2013 as NS 4650 GP59E. The GP59E features a new EM2000 microprocessor, an all-new electrical cabinet with SmartStart auto start/stop, rebuilt 12-710G3C-BC prime-mover with EMDEC EUI system, NS-designed split cooling, the NS Admiral cab with cab signals, LSL, and CCB26 electronic brake valve. The GP59E is set up to operate with NS class RP-M4C road slugs.

In 2016, Norfolk Southern began a program to upgrade GP50 and GP59 units to GP59ECO's. These will be similar to the GP33ECO locomotives, but these units will be paid for by Norfolk Southern, not government funding. In June 2016, the first unit, 4662, was completed, rebuilt from GP50 7073.

== Original owners ==
EMD GP59 orders
Railroad	Quantity	Road numbers	Notes
EMD	3	8-10	Acquired by Norfolk Southern & numbered NS 4606-4608
Norfolk Southern	33	4609-4641	4610 was painted in Southern Railway colors from 1994 to 2012, when it was repainted into a special NS/Operation Lifesaver (OLS) paint scheme to make way for the "heritage units", including NS GE ES44AC #8099, which is now the Southern Railway heritage unit. Units not rebuilt as GP59E's will be rebuilt as GP59ECOs. Units renumbered to avoid conflict with AC44C6M rebuilds.
Totals	36		
