= 1500 class =

1500 class or Class 1500 may refer to:

- ATM Class 1500, Milan tram vehicles
- CP Class 1500, diesel locomotives
- GWR 1500 Class, 0-6-0PT steam locomotives
- NS Class 1500, electric locomotives
