= EMD GP60 =

Locomotive class

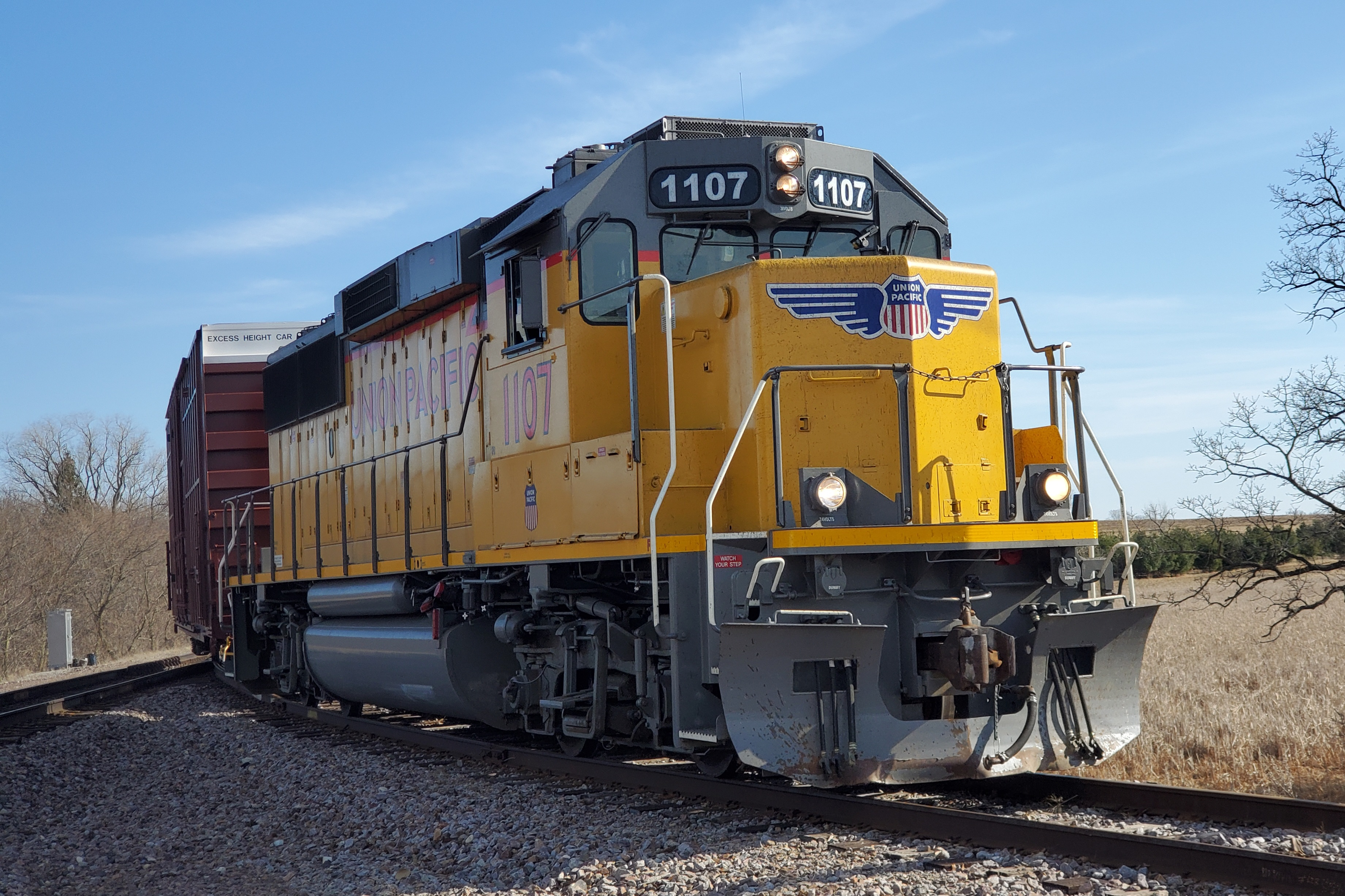
- Union Pacific 1107 in Clyman Junction, Wisconsin
Type and origin
- Power type: Diesel-electric
- Builder: General Motors Electro-Motive Division (EMD)
- Model: GP60, GP60M, GP60B
- Build date: 1985 – 1994
- Total produced: 294 GP60; 63 GP60M; 23 GP60B
Specifications
- Configuration
  - AAR: B-B
- Gauge: 4 ft 8 1/2 in (1,435 mm) standard gauge
- Length: 59 ft 9 in (18.21 m)
- Fuel capacity: 3,700 US gal (14,000 L; 3,100 imp gal)
- Prime mover: EMD 16-710
- Engine type: V16 diesel
- Cylinders: 16
Performance figures
- Maximum speed: 65 MPH
- Power output: 3,800 hp (2,800 kW)
- Tractive effort
  - Starting: 390 kN (87,675 lb_{f})
  - Continuous: 340 kN (76,435 lb_{f})
Career
- Operators: See list

The EMD GP60 is a model of 4-axle (B-B) diesel-electric locomotive built by General Motors Electro-Motive Division between 1985 and 1994. The GP60 was EMD's first engine that was classified as a "third-generation" locomotive. Hidden behind the electrical cabinet doors on the rear wall of the cab, the GP60 concealed a trio of microprocessors that monitored and managed a host of engine, cooling system and control functions. The engine's on-board microprocessors replaced hundreds of wiring circuits, dozens of relays and all but one module card, making it an improvement among EMD's engines.

Power was provided by a 16-cylinder 710G3A diesel engine, which could produce 3,800 horsepower (2,800 kW). This locomotive was 59 feet 9 inches long and featured a 3,700-US-gallon (14,000 L) fuel tank. The GP60 series shared the same frame as the GP59. Cabless 'B' units of this locomotive model were also built; they were known as GP60B models. Units built with a North American Safety Cab were designated GP60M. These latter two types were purchased exclusively by the Atchison, Topeka and Santa Fe Railway. A total of 294 GP60, 23 GP60B and 63 GP60M units were built by EMD. Due to the mainstream focus of railroads on powerful six-axle units, and strict emissions standards, aside from the collaborations with Motive Power Incorporated, the GP60 is the last new EMD "Geep".

== Railroads and models ==
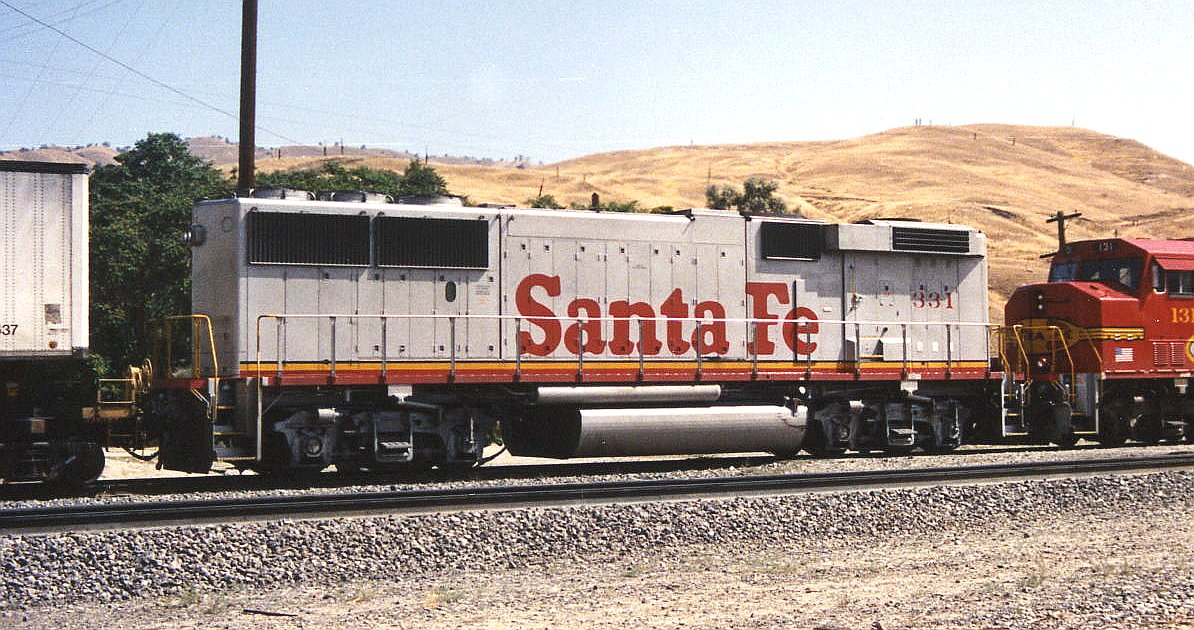
ATSF 331, a cabless GP60B, eastbound at Caliente, California.

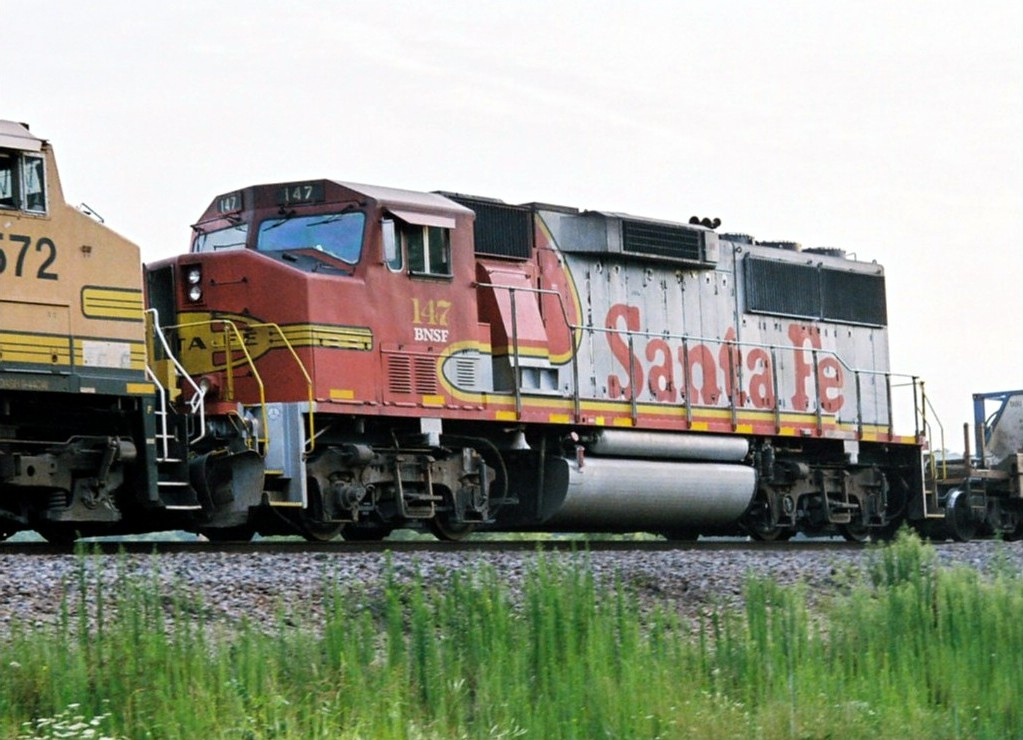
BNSF 147, GP60M

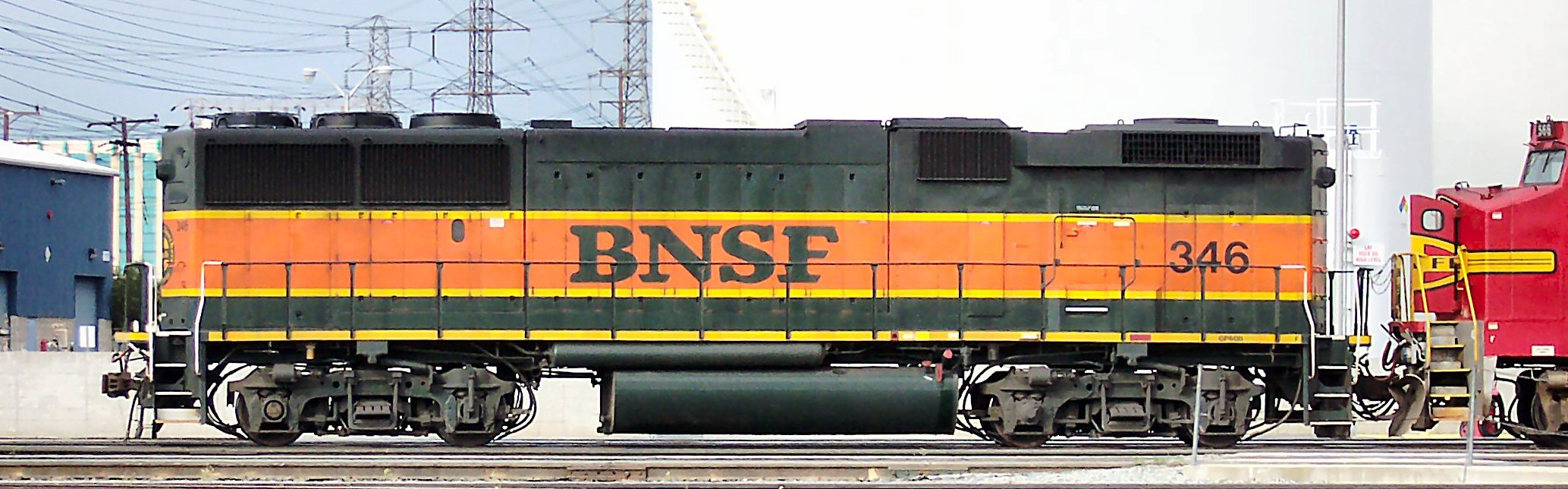
BNSF 346, a former Santa Fe unit.

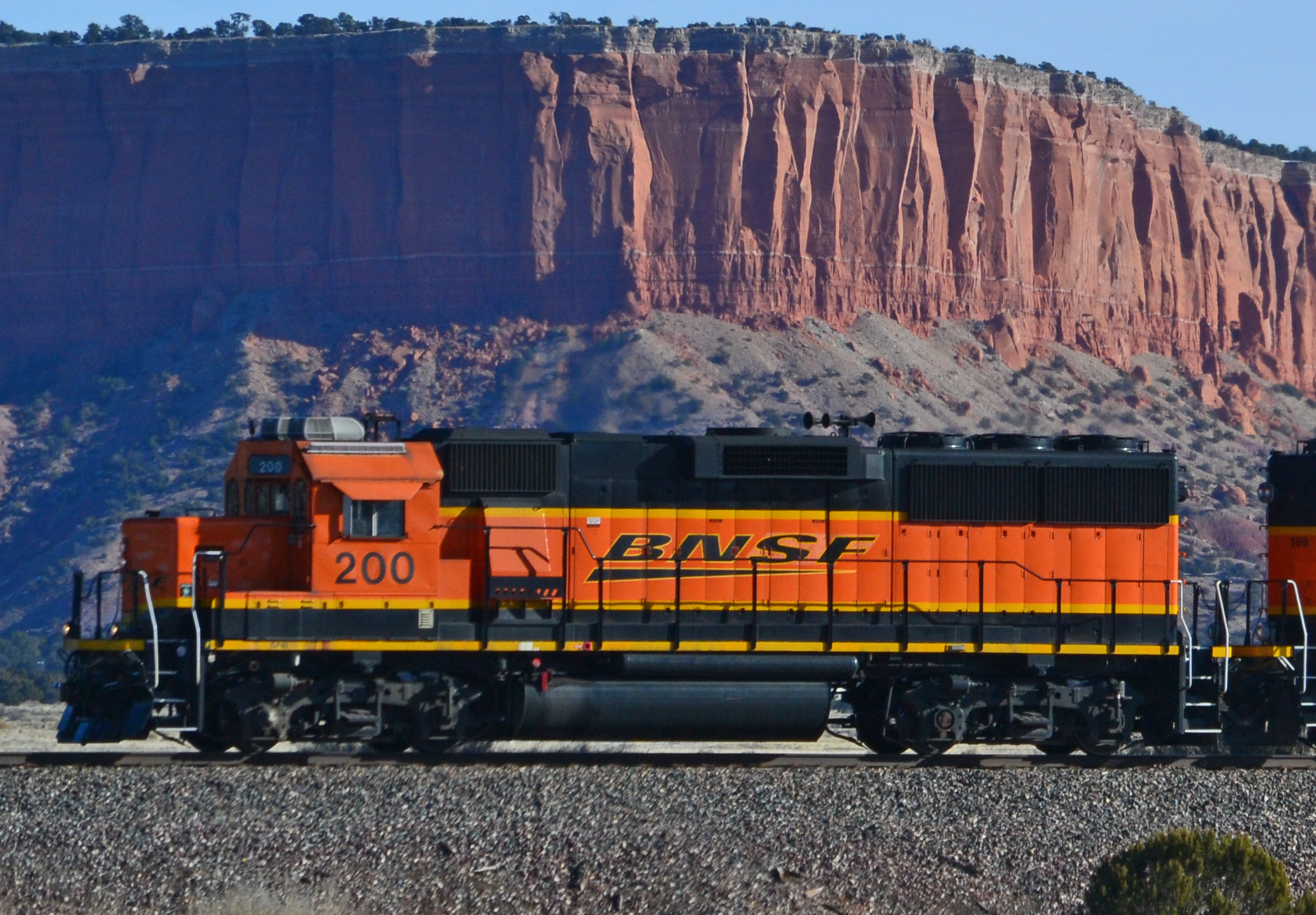
BNSF No. 200 is ex–GP60B No. 347, rebuilt by BNSF into a standard GP60 by installing a cab from an SD40-2.

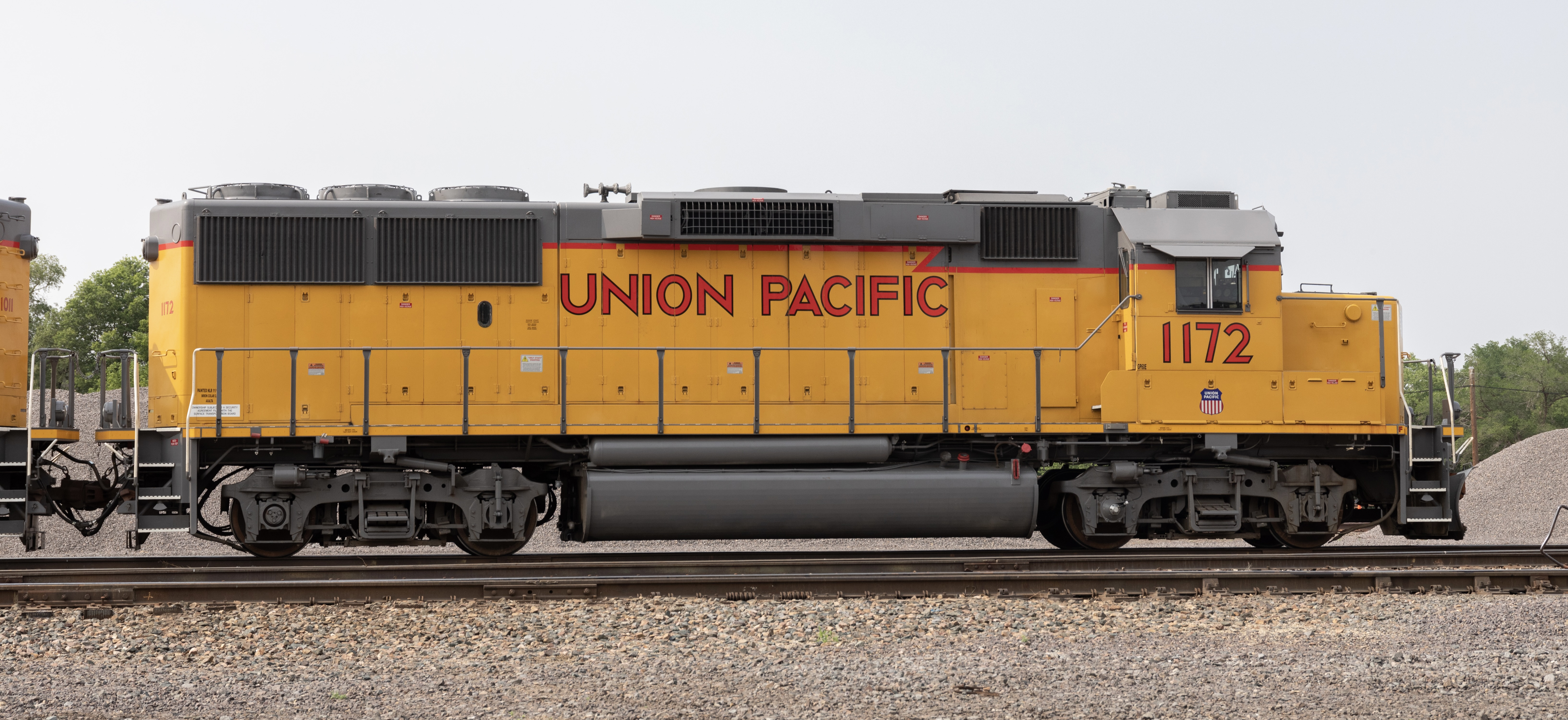
Union Pacific GP60E #1172 in Salina, Kansas.

Santa Fe followed its 40 standard-cab GP60s with an order for 63 custom GP60Ms. The GP60M featured North American Safety cabs, and was the only 60 Series B-B locomotive with this feature. The nose has a headlight that is slightly offset to the right to accommodate the front door. These were the first new units delivered in the road's revived "Super Fleet" Warbonnet Paint Scheme. Santa Fe GP60Ms 100–162 were delivered between May and September 1990.

23 GP60 B units were built, all for Santa Fe. Taking advantage of the cabless configuration, the dynamic brake equipment on the GP60B was moved forward and away from the prime mover. Santa Fe 325–347 were the only GP60Bs. Most of these remain in service with BNSF; one of them, GP60B 347, was rebuilt into a standard GP60 by applying the cab of a Union Pacific SD40-2 to the locomotive in 2010.

Rio Grande's first (and last) 60 series units were GP60s 3154–3156, built to SP specs in May 1990.

Southern Pacific purchased the first, last, and largest fleet of GP60s, ordering 195 units between December 1987 and February 1994. Nearly half of the SP Fleet was lettered for subsidiary Cotton Belt, but an even hundred were directly Southern Pacific.

Two units built for the Texas Mexican Railway were returned to lessor Helm Financial after Kansas City Southern acquired the "Tex Mex". The pair operated for a while in lease service on CSX, then were briefly on the roster of the Vermont Railway System (VRS) as its 381–382 before that carrier deemed them unsuitable for its operations. 381 was even repainted into VRS red and white before being returned to Helm in 2004. These units were then sold to BNSF as No. 168 and No. 169, later renumbered in 2014 to 198 and 199.

== Original owners ==
EMD GP60 orders
Railroad	Quantity	Road numbers	Notes
Atchison, Topeka and Santa Fe Railway	40	4000–4039	To BNSF 8700–8730, 8732–8739 (ATSF 4031 wrecked and retired); to BNSF 159–197 in 2014
U.S. Department of Energy (SROX)	1	106	Used at the Savannah River Site near Aiken, South Carolina.
Denver and Rio Grande Western Railroad	3	3154–3156	Now owned by Union Pacific Railroad and renumbered UP 1900–1902. 1900-1901 later renumbered 1168 and 1081 respectively.
EMDX	3	EMD 5–7	GP60 Demonstrators with aerodynamic cab. Now owned by CSX Transportation and numbered CSXT 6897–6899.
Norfolk Southern	50	7101–7150	7100 was originally 7117. The unit was involved in a fatal accident in which the conductor was killed, and after being repaired in July 1998, at the request of the victim's family that NS no longer use that number, was renumbered NS 7100. Units 7137, 7138, and 7143 were damaged when NS train 226 rear-ended another NS train. 7137 was destroyed. 7143 was later scrapped, but 7138 was repaired and placed into service.
Southern Pacific Railroad	100	9600–9619, 9715–9794	Now with Union Pacific Railroad and renumbered UP 1902–1921, 2015–2097. Now numbered 1000-1171 (some reclassified as GP62). #9794 was the last domestic EMD GP-Series unit built for any railroad.
St. Louis Southwestern Railway	95	9620–9714	Now with Union Pacific Railroad and renumbered UP 1962, 1984–1987, 1990–1993, 1997–2000, 2003–2014. Now numbered 1004-1170. (some reclassified as GP62)
Texas Mexican Railway	2	869–870	Later Helm Financial and renumbered HLCX 7700–7701. Both leased to the Vermont Rail System in February 2002 with 7700 being renumbered Vermont Railway 381 and 7701 being renumbered Green Mountain Railroad 382. Both returned and HLCX and renumbered back to 7700–7701 in September 2004. Sold to BNSF 168 & 169 in August 2011, renumbered 198–199 in 2014.
EMD GP60B orders
Atchison, Topeka and Santa Fe Railway	23	325–347	Now with BNSF Railway as BNSF 325–346 (347 rebuilt in 2010 with a cab from an SD40-2 and is now BNSF 170 and later “BN” 200, later changed to BNSF 200).
EMD GP60M orders
Atchison, Topeka and Santa Fe Railway	63	100–162	Now with BNSF Railway as BNSF 100–162 (142, 144, 148, and 152 wrecked and retired); BNSF 159–162 renumbered to 142, 144, 158, and 152 in 2014. All rebuilt to GP60M-3.
Totals	380		

== Rebuilds ==
Between 2019 and 2023, many Union Pacific GP60s underwent the GP60E rebuild project at its Downing B. Jenks shops North Little Rock, Arkansas. As of July 2026, UP rosters 33 GP60E rebuilds. In addition, UP has 16 "GP62" rebuilds, which were overhauled for easier long hood forward operation through the additions of features such as rear ditch lights. As of July 2026, UP rosters 16 GP62 rebuilds.
