= EMD SDL39 =

American diesel-electric locomotive

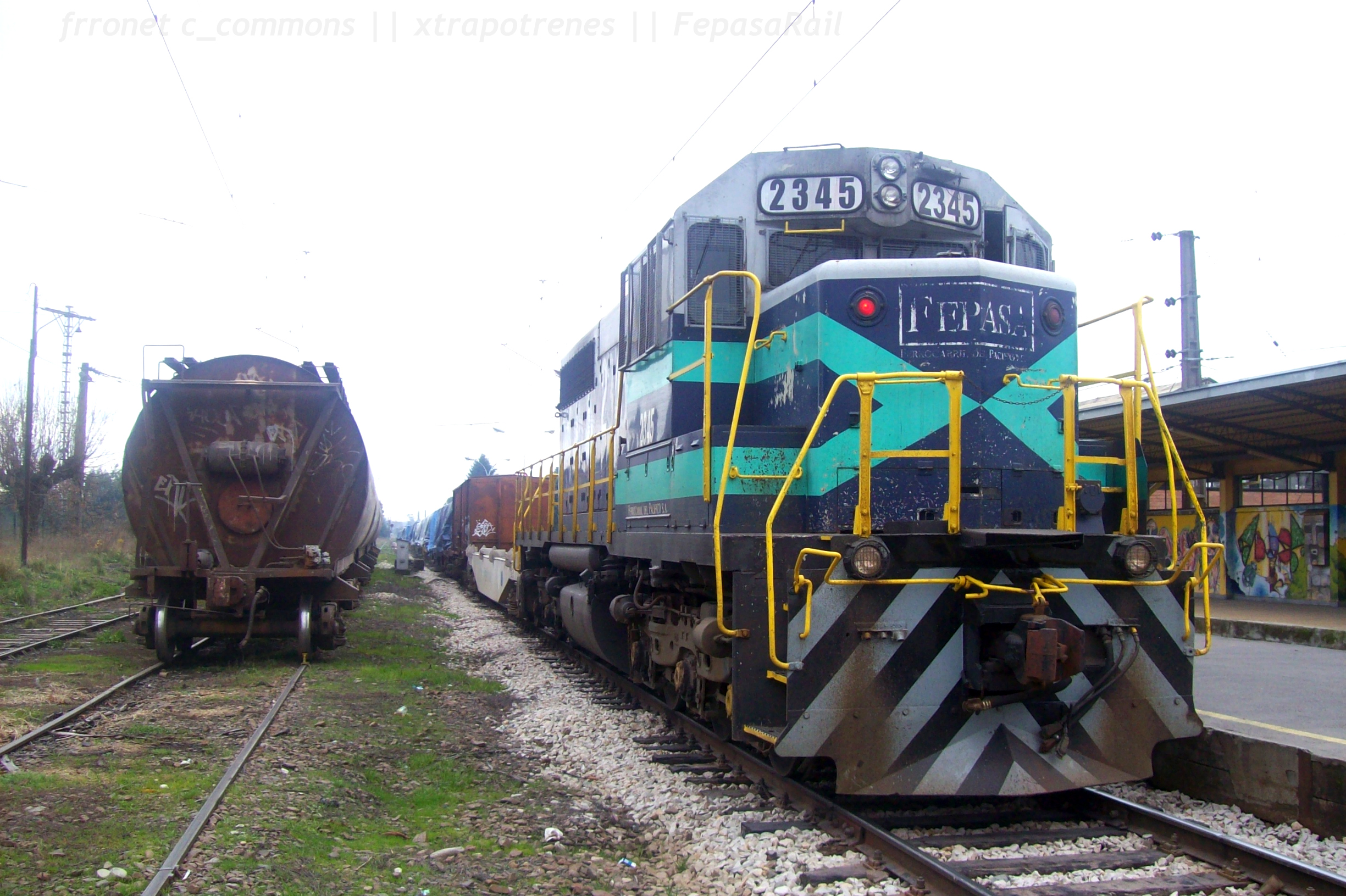
- FEPASA D-2345 at Lautaro, Chile.
Type and origin
- Power type: Diesel-electric
- Builder: General Motors Electro-Motive Division (EMD)
- Serial number: 34272–34276, 7345-1–7345-5
- Model: SDL39
- Build date: March 1969 - November 1972
- Total produced: 10
Specifications
- Configuration
  - AAR: C-C
  - UIC: Co′Co′
- Gauge: 4 ft 8 1/2 in (1,435 mm) standard gauge, later converted to 5 ft 6 in (1,676 mm)
- Length: 55 ft 2 in (16.81 m)
- Fuel capacity: 1,200 US gal (4,500 L; 1,000 imp gal)
- Prime mover: EMD 12-645E3
- Engine type: V12 diesel
- Cylinders: 12
Performance figures
- Power output: 2,300 hp (1.7 MW)
Career
- Operators: Milwaukee Road; → Soo Line; → Wisconsin Central; → Fepasa
- Numbers: MILW 581-590; SOO 582–590; WC 582–590; FEPASA 2341-2349
- Locale: Upper midwest United States and Chile
- Disposition: All reportedly still in service

The EMD SDL39 is a rare model of 6-axle diesel-electric locomotive built by General Motors Electro-Motive Division between March 1969 and November 1972. Power was provided by the EMD 645E3 12-cylinder engine as used in the EMD GP39 which generated 2,300 horsepower (1.7 MW). The unit was built on a short 55-foot-2-inch (16.81 m) frame with C-C export trucks, barely tipping the scales at 250,000 pounds (110,000 kg) and managing a light-footed axle-loading of just 20.8 short tons (18.6 long tons; 18.9 t) per axle.

All 10 examples of this locomotive model were built for Milwaukee Road, who wanted a lightweight road-switcher to replace their fleet of ALCO RSC-2s.

These Milwaukee Road units were numbered 581–590. The 581 was wrecked at Sacred Heart, MN in 1983, and scrapped the following year. The remaining nine units were transferred to the Soo Line Railroad when it acquired the Milwaukee Road. All were subsequently included in the sale of the Soo's Lakes States Division (most of its network in Wisconsin and Upper Michigan, plus some lines in adjoining Illinois and Minnesota) to the new Wisconsin Central Limited. After the Wisconsin Central was purchased by, and merged into the Canadian National Railway, the nine units were returned to the lessor, and were sold to FEPASA, Chilean Freight Operation Concession.
