= ALCO RSC-2 =

Diesel-electric locomotive of the road switcher type

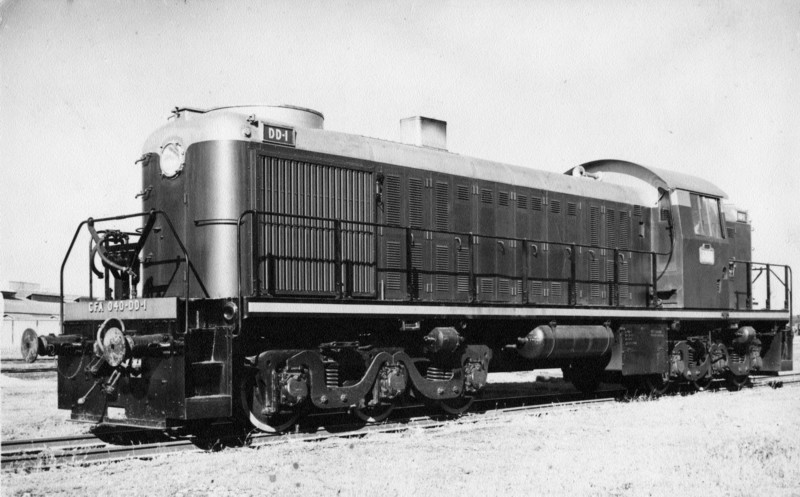
Type and origin
- Power type: Diesel-electric
- Builder: ALCO
- Model: E-1661A, E-1661B, E-1661C
- Build date: October 1946 – May 1950
- Total produced: 91
Specifications
- Configuration
  - AAR: A1A-A1A
- Gauge: 4 ft 8 1/2 in (1,435 mm) standard gauge 1,668 mm (5 ft 5 21/32 in) (CP)
- Wheel diameter: 40 in (1,016 mm)
- Length: 53 ft 1 in (16.18 m)
- Width: 10 ft 0 in (3.05 m)
- Height: 14 ft 5 in (4.39 m)
- Loco weight: 242,500 lb (110,000 kg)
- Fuel capacity: 800 US gal (670 imp gal; 3,000 L)
- Prime mover: ALCO 244
- Engine type: V12 Four-stroke diesel
- Generator: DC generator
- Traction motors: 4 of DC traction motors
- Cylinders: 12
- Transmission: Electric
Performance figures
- Maximum speed: 65 mph (105 km/h)
- Power output: 1,500 hp (1,100 kW) later models 1,600 hp (1,200 kW)
- Tractive effort: 40,425 lbf (179,820 N)

The ALCO RSC-2 was a diesel-electric locomotive that rode on three-axle trucks, having an A1A-A1A wheel arrangement.

91 locomotives were produced — Used in much the same manner as its four-axle counterpart, the ALCO RS-2, though the wheel arrangement lowered the axle load for operation on light rail such as are found on branch lines.

The Milwaukee Road was the first railroad to take delivery of the RSC-2, initially assigning them to their Valley Division (headquartered near Wausau, Wisconsin) in November 1946. This was done in order to study the effects of an all-diesel roster (i.e. no steam locomotives available as a backup). The experiment was deemed a success and soon all steam locomotives were gone from the Valley Division. RSC-2s would faithfully serve the Milwaukee Road for many years, until being replaced in turn by the EMD SDL39.

ALCO also exported these units to the state railway of Portugal, where Portuguese Railways (CP) designated them Série 1500. These locomotives were built for the Iberian track gauge of (1,668 mm (5 ft 5 21/32 in)). The last units in Portugal served in regular passenger service into the first decade of the 21st century. Of these, five are still running today, 70 years after their arrival (one is a museum locomotive, while the other four are owned by track maintenance companies). Five units were exported to the Algerian National Railways where they were used in passenger train service.

== Original buyers ==
Image	Railroad	Quantity	Road numbers	Notes
	Caminhos de Ferro Portugueses (CP)	12	1501-1512	Designated Série 1500 by CP. Uprated from 1,500 horsepower (1,100 kW) to 2,000 horsepower (1,500 kW) in 1976. Top speed was then 120 kilometres per hour (75 mph), the track gauge 1,668 mm (5 ft 5 21/32 in) . Four still in service.
	Chicago, Milwaukee, St. Paul and Pacific Railroad	22	975–996	renumbered to 580–597, 490–493 series, not in order Milwaukee Road 988 preserved at the Mid-Continent Railway Museum and is under restoration.
	Office des Chemins de Fer Algériens	5	040DD1–040DD5	
	Seaboard Air Line Railroad	37	1500-1536	1532-1536 rated at 1,600 hp (1,200 kW)
	Soo Line Railroad	4	368–371	
	Union Pacific Railroad	11	1180–1190	1190 was originally ALCO demonstrator 1190, all units later renumbered 1280-1290
	Total	91		

== Preservation ==
- Milwaukee Road #988 is preserved at the Mid-Continent Railway Museum in North Freedom, Wisconsin and is under restoration to operating condition.
