= EMD GP50 =

Diesel–electric locomotive built by EMD

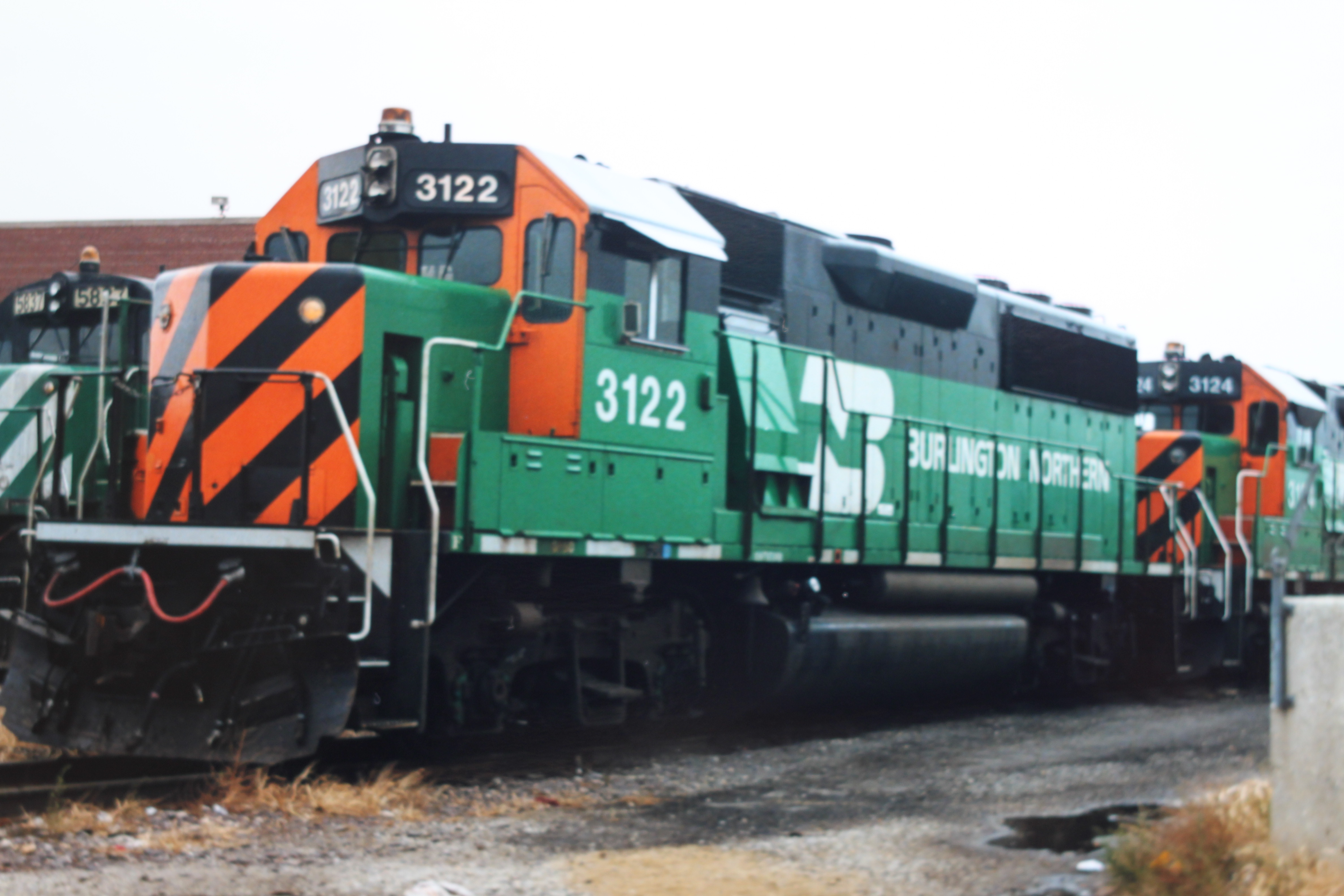
- BN GP50 3122 at Clyde Yard, Chicago in its short lived experimental "tiger stripe" paint scheme. (1987)
Type and origin
- Power type: Diesel–electric
- Builder: General Motors Electro-Motive Division (EMD)
- Model: GP50
- Build date: 1980 – 1985
- Total produced: 278
Specifications
- Configuration
  - AAR: B-B
- Gauge: 4 ft 8 1/2 in (1,435 mm) standard gauge
- Wheel diameter: 40 in (1,000 mm)
- Wheelbase: 43 ft 9 in (13.34 m)
- Length: 59 ft 2 in (18.03 m)
- Width: 10 ft 4 in (3.15 m)
- Height: 15 ft 7 in (4.75 m)
- Loco weight: 250,000 lb (113,398 kg)
- Prime mover: EMD 645F3B
- Engine type: V16 diesel
- Cylinders: 16
Performance figures
- Maximum speed: 65 mph (105 km/h)
- Power output: 3,500–3,600 hp (2,610–2,685 kW)
- Tractive effort: 65,000 lb (29,000 kg)

An EMD GP50 is a 4-axle diesel–electric locomotive built by General Motors Electro-Motive Division (EMD). It is powered by a 16-cylinder EMD 645F3B diesel engine, which can produce between 3,500 and 3,600 hp (2,610 and 2,685 kW). 278 examples of this locomotive were built by EMD between 1980 and 1985. BN 3110-3162 were all delivered with five cab seats, the final five of these having the cab lengthened 23 in (584 mm) vs. the standard EMD cab. The GP50 retains the same overall length of 59 feet 2 inches (18.03 meters) as the GP38, GP39, and GP40 series locomotives.

== History ==
EMD delivered the first GP50s to Chicago and North Western in the summer of 1980. Much of the GP50's new technology was tested and developed with the experimental GP40X.

Changes to the 645F3B engine compared to older versions, include a stronger crankcase, new turbocharger, new plate crab for clamping the power assemblies to the crankshaft, a camshaft of increased hardness, one-half-inch-diameter plunger injectors, laser-hardened cylinder liners, rocking piston pins, and a slower idle speed. A new traction motor, the D87, has a continuous rating of 1170 amps, compared to 1150 amps for its predecessor, the D77, with new interpole and main field coils that use 16% more copper, the number of turns increased from 14 to 17 to improve commutation at high currents, longer brush life, and sturdier gearing with increased surface hardness. The new motors are connected in permanent parallel to a new AR15 alternator rated at 4,680 amps.

The GP50 was the first production locomotive to feature EMD's Super Series wheelslip control system, first seen on the GP40X. Super Series employs a Doppler radar unit mounted under the front coupler pocket to measure the locomotive's speed and adjusts the power to each axle to provide maximum adhesion while eliminating wheelslip. This system provided an increase in adhesion of at least 33% compared to conventional locomotives.

Other changes compared to the GP40-2 include an underframe with a lighter, deeper sill that reduced the frame's weight and a new exhaust system and "Q-type" cooling fans to meet January 1980 Federal noise regulations.

The GP50 was the first production locomotive series to be fitted with a microprocessor, and EMD fitted the 60 series with microprocessors as standard following the success of LARS which was developed in partnership with Burlington Northern and Rockwell Collins.

== Original owners ==
| Image | Railroad | Quantity | Road numbers | Notes |
|---|---|---|---|---|
| | Atchison, Topeka and Santa Fe Railway | 45 | 3810-3854 | All now in service with BNSF Railway. 3853 wrecked and retired. |
| | Burlington Northern Railroad | 63 | 3100-3162 | 3100-3109 were ordered by St. Louis – San Francisco Railway, but delivered to BN. 3100 was the only one that received Frisco colors, though with BN number. LARS was installed on 3108-3157. Most are now in service with BNSF Railway and some are being rebuilt as GP25s. |
| | Chicago and North Western Railway | 50 | 5050-5099 | To Union Pacific Railroad; since retired. |
| | Missouri Pacific Railroad | 30 | 3500-3529 | To Union Pacific Railroad. |
| | Southern Railway | 90 | 7003-7092 | These were built with High Hoods for Southern. Norfolk Southern has rebuilt 28 of their GP50s as GP33ECOs. |
| Totals | | 278 | | |

== Rebuilds ==
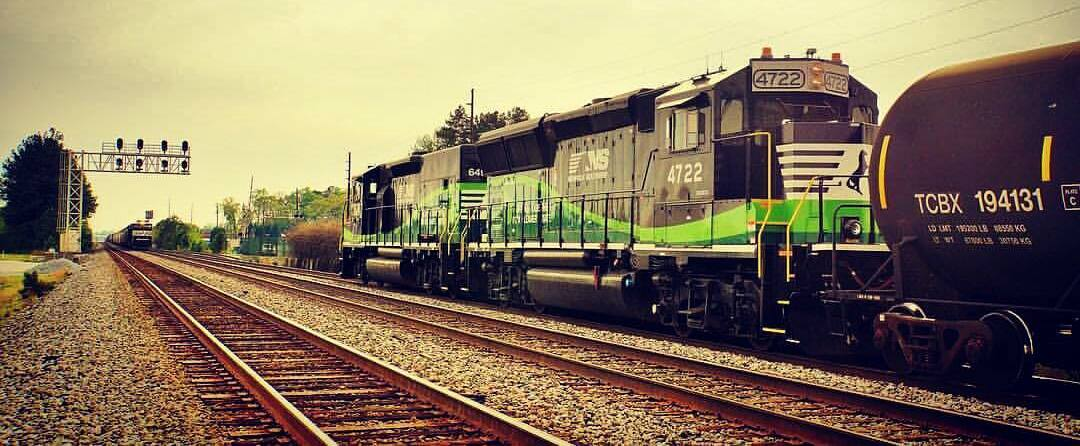
NS Train G74 with RP-M4C leading and GP33ECO 4722 trailing. 4722 is formerly SOU GP50 7048, and was later renumbered to 6722.

=== Norfolk Southern ===
In 2015–2016 the Norfolk Southern Railway rebuilt 28 of their GP50s into the low-emission GP33ECO. And in early 2016, Norfolk Southern rebuilt one GP50 into their first GP59ECO. These units, most of which utilized GP59 cores, have similar specifications as the earlier GP33ECO program but have been built without public funding contributing to their construction.

=== BNSF ===
In 2004, BNSF started rebuilding and derating GP50s and reclassifying them as GP25s. These locomotives are regoverned to 2,500 hp (1,864 kW) using new load control systems (LCS). The original D87 traction motors may have also been replaced by D78 traction motors, since the original traction motors would not have supported this rebuild. Many of these GP25s have been put to use as remote control locomotives.

== See also ==
- EMD GP49, a version of the GP50 with a smaller, less powerful prime mover
- EMD SD50, a six-axle locomotive using the same engine as the GP50
