= EMD GP39-2 =

Class of American diesel-electric locomotives

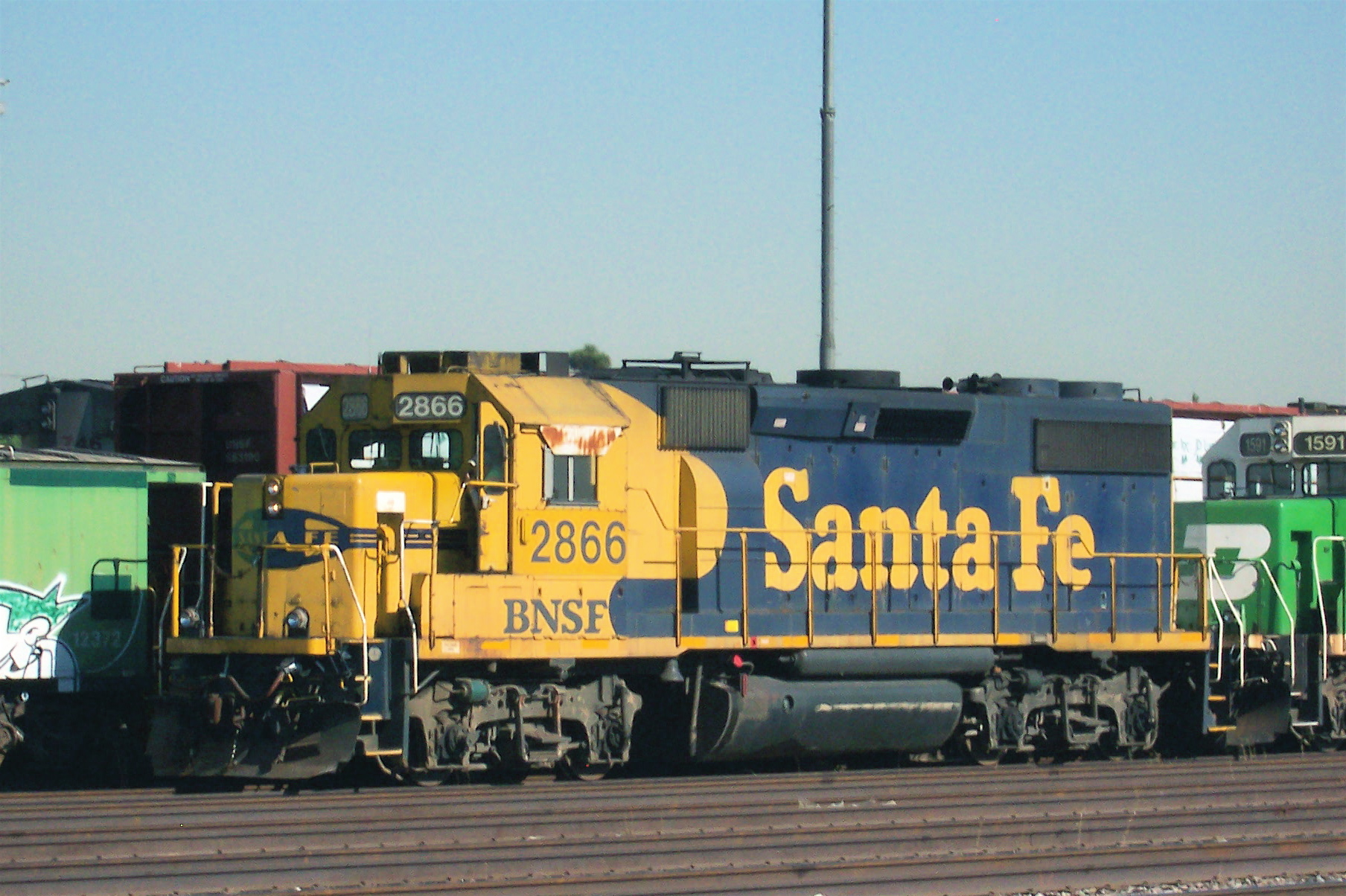
- BNSF 2866 in Santa Fe paint in Commerce, California
Type and origin
- Power type: Diesel–electric
- Builder: General Motors Electro-Motive Division (EMD)
- Model: GP39-2
- Build date: 1974–1984
- Total produced: 239
Specifications
- Configuration
  - AAR: B-B
- Gauge: 4 ft 8 1/2 in (1,435 mm) standard gauge
- Length: 59 ft 2 in (18.03 m)
- Prime mover: EMD 12-645E3
- Engine type: V12 diesel
- Cylinders: 12
Performance figures
- Power output: 2,300 hp (1,720 kW)
Career
- Locale: United States
- Preserved: Reading Company #3412
- Disposition: Many still in service, fourteen units rebuilt, one preserved

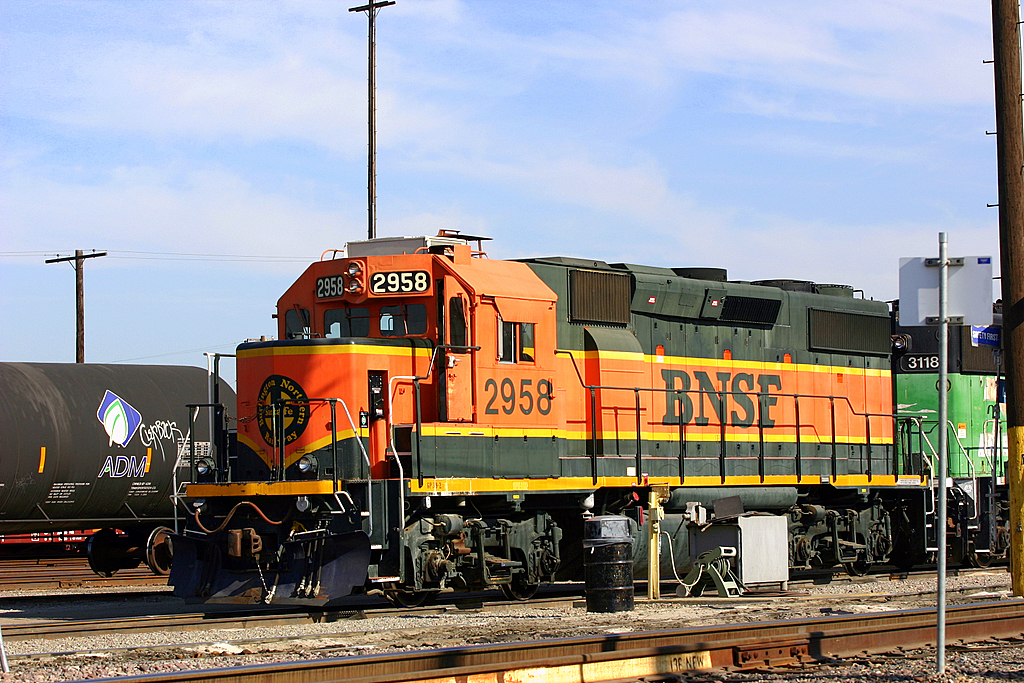
BNSF 2958 at Mormon Yard in Stockton, California

The EMD GP39-2 is a 4-axle diesel locomotive built by General Motors Electro-Motive Division between 1974 and 1984. 239 examples of this locomotive were built for American railroads. Part of the EMD Dash 2 line, the GP39-2 was an upgraded GP39. The power for this locomotive was provided by a turbocharged 12-cylinder 12-645E3 diesel engine, which could produce 2,300 horsepower (1,720 kW).

Unlike the original GP39, which sold only 23 examples as railroads preferred the reliable non-turbocharged GP38, the GP39-2 was reasonably successful, ascribed to its better fuel economy relative to the GP38-2, which became of more interest in the 1970s energy crisis, and to its better performance at altitude.

== Original owners ==
The GP39-2 sold to five railroads and two industrial operators:

Railroad	Quantity	Road numbers	Notes
Atchison, Topeka and Santa Fe Railway	106	3600–3705	Remainder to BNSF; 3600-3616 sold to Willamette & Pacific Railroad in 1993 as 2301-2317. Now later Portland & Western Railroad
Burlington Northern Railroad	40	2700–2739	All to BNSF
Kennecott Utah Copper Corporation	32	1-3, 705–711, 779–799, 905	705-711 and 779-799 were built with raised cab roofs and extra windows for improved visibility in the Bingham open pit copper mine. Kennecott #3 was built for the Ray Mines Division of Kennecott Copper Corporation
Missouri–Kansas–Texas Railroad	20	360–379	371 to UP as 2370, then to NEGS, then to WAMX as 3927, operating with AA; remainder to UP
Phelps Dodge Corporation	1	33	
Reading Company	20	3401–3420	To Delaware and Hudson Railway as 373, 374, 380, 382–386, 389, 7401–7403, 7406–7410, and 7418–7419, then to CSX as 4300–4319
Delaware and Hudson Railway	20	7601-7620	To Boston and Maine, to UP, and then to Webb Asset Management
Total	239		

== Rebuilds ==
As of July 2026, Union Pacific has rebuilt 14 of their GP39-2's into GP39Ns at the Downing B. Jenks shops in North Little Rock, Arkansas.. These units received a microprocessor control system to increase adhesion, control options, and extend the life of the locomotive.

== Preservation ==
One GP39-2 is preserved as of 2026:

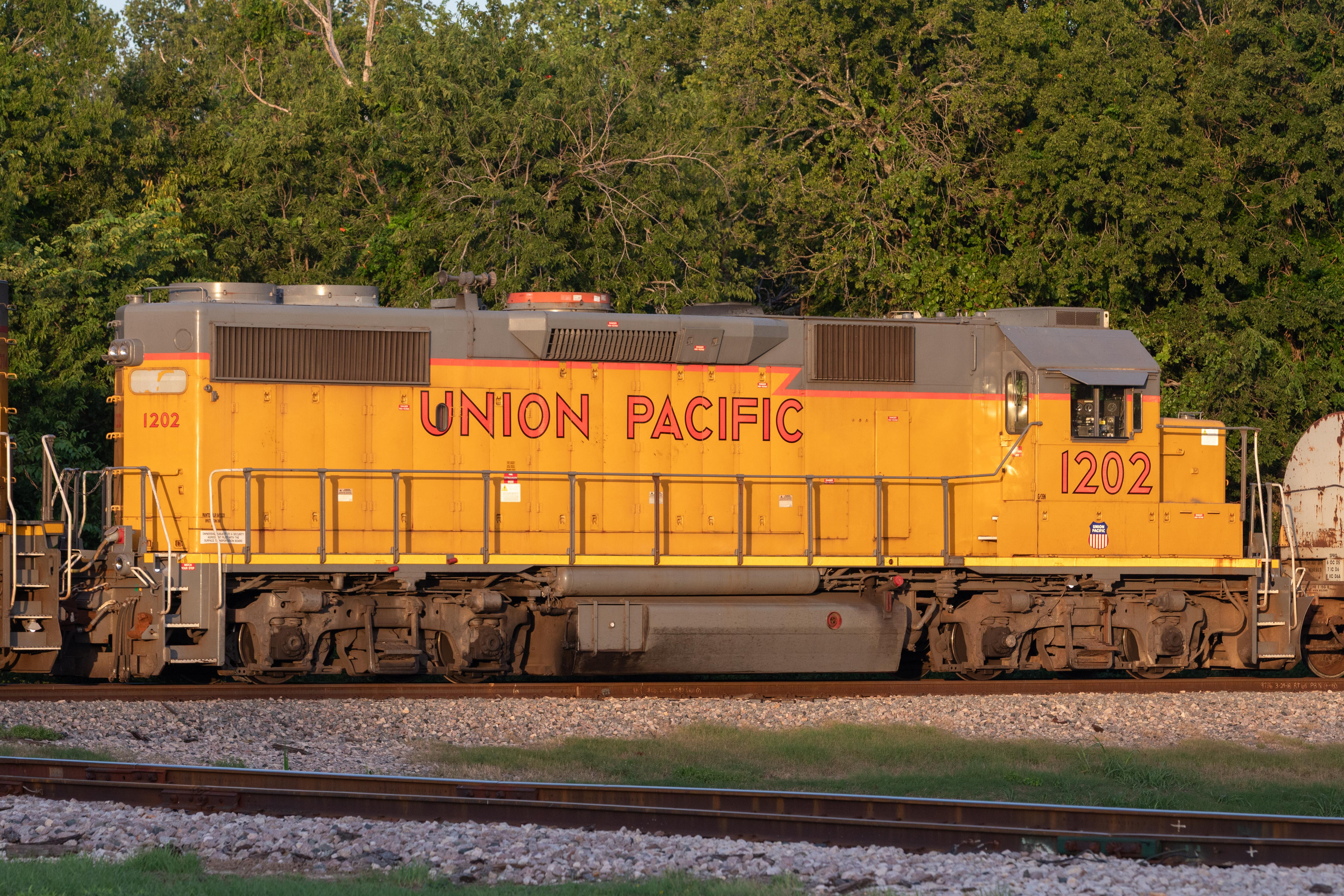
- Union Pacific GP39N #1202 in July 2026
  Reading Company #3412, later CSX #4317, is preserved at the Reading Railroad Heritage Museum in Hamburg, Pennsylvania. It was donated by CSX in 2019. The locomotive is undergoing restoration to its original appearance.
