= EMD GP39 =

4-axle diesel-electric locomotive

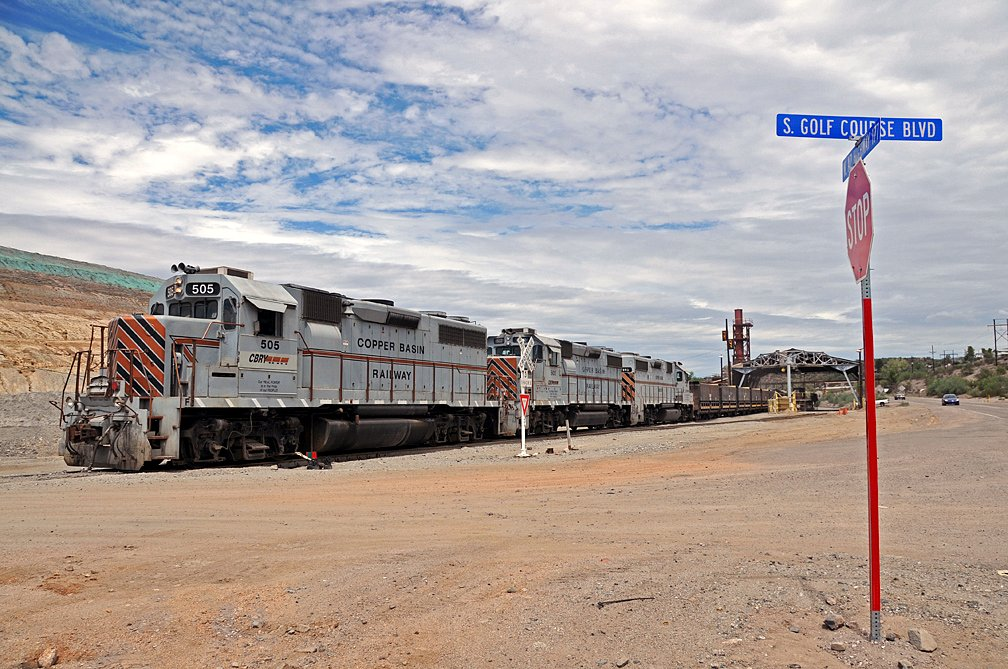
- Copper Basin Railway No. 505 at Hayden, Arizona in 2010.
Type and origin
- Power type: Diesel-electric
- Builder: General Motors Electro-Motive Division (EMD)
- Model: GP39, GP39X
- Build date: June 1969 – July 1970
- Total produced: 21 GP39; 2 GP39DC; 6 GP39X
Specifications
- Gauge: 4 ft 8 1/2 in (1,435 mm) standard gauge
- Prime mover: EMD 645
- Engine type: V12 diesel engine
- Cylinders: 12
Performance figures
- Power output: 2,300 hp (1.72 MW)
Career
- Locale: United States

The EMD GP39 is a 4-axle diesel-electric locomotive built by General Motors Electro-Motive Division between June 1969 and July 1970. The GP39 was a derivative of the GP38 equipped with a turbocharged EMD 645E3 12-cylinder engine which generated 2,300 hp (1.72 MW).

23 examples of this locomotive model were built for American railroads.

Burlington Northern Railway later rebuilt GP30 and GP35 locomotives that it classified as GP39s, but they were not built as such by GM/EMD.

== Production history ==
Twenty of the original 23 were built for the Chesapeake and Ohio Railway, while the other buyers were Kennecott Copper (2) and Atlanta & St. Andrews Bay (1). Though the GP39 was not a popular locomotive, EMD later revisited the idea of a turbocharged GP38 with its GP39-2 in 1974.

=== GP39DC ===
Two examples of the GP39 were built as GP39DC locomotives in June 1970. These used a DC main generator instead of the alternator used on the standard GP39 units, but were otherwise identical. 2 examples of this locomotive model were built for Kennecott Copper Company as 1 and 2, later sold to Copper Basin Railway as 401 and 402.

=== GP39X ===
The EMD GP39X is a 2,600 hp (1,940 kW) diesel-electric locomotive built by the General Motors Electro-Motive Division. All six units built were constructed for the Southern Railway with Southern's characteristic high short hood. They were updated by EMD at Norfolk Southern's (Southern's successor) request to EMD GP49 standards in 1982. Norfolk Southern retired them in 2001, and they now are owned by Tri-Rail, after being upgraded with head end power and a lowered short hood.

== Original owners ==
Railroad	Quantity	Road Numbers	Notes
Atlanta & St. Andrews Bay	1	507	to VMV 507, then Paducah & Louisville 8507
Chesapeake & Ohio	20	3900-3919	to CSXT 4280-4299, all retired with the exception of 4 converted to slugs.
Kennecott Copper	2	1-2	to Copper Basin Railway 401-402
Totals	23		

GP39X

Railroad	Quantity	Road Numbers	Notes
Southern Railway	6	4600-4605	
Totals	6		

== See also ==
- EMD SDL39
