= EMD GP40X =

American locomotive class

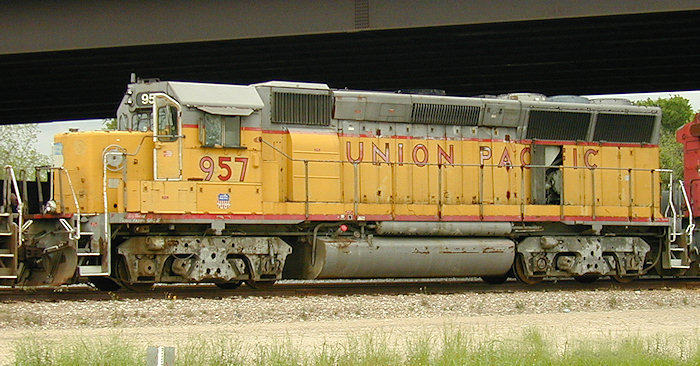
- UP 957 was originally UP 9003. This shows the optional HT-B trucks.
Type and origin
- Power type: Diesel-electric
- Builder: General Motors Electro-Motive Division (EMD)
- Model: GP40X
- Build date: 1965; 1977 – 1978
- Total produced: 24
Specifications
- Configuration
  - AAR: B-B
- Gauge: 4 ft 8 1/2 in (1,435 mm) standard gauge
- Prime mover: EMD 16-645F3B
- Engine type: V16 diesel
- Cylinders: 16
Performance figures
- Maximum speed: 83 mph (134 km/h)
- Power output: 3,500 hp (2.61 MW)
Career
- Locale: North America

An EMD GP40X is a 4-axle diesel-electric locomotive built by General Motors Electro-Motive Division between December 1977 and June 1978. Power for this unit was provided by a turbocharged 16-cylinder 16-645F3B engine which could produce 3,500 horsepower (2,610 kW). 24 examples of this locomotive were built for North American railroads. This unit was a pre-production version meant to test technologies later incorporated into EMD's 50-series locomotives GP50 and SD50.

== Design ==
Ten GP40X were delivered with an experimental HT-B truck design that became an option (but never used) on the production GP50, including 6 for Union Pacific and 4 for Southern Pacific. These trucks were meant to improve locomotive adhesion. The remainder rode on Blomberg trucks.

SP's units included several experimental modifications, including L-shaped windshields and coverings over the radiator sections, nicknamed "elephant ears."

== 1965 experimental locomotive ==
The designation GP40X was also given to an experimental locomotive built on an EMD GP35 frame in May 1965. Only one example of this locomotive was ever produced, the EMD 433A, a 3,000 hp (2,240 kW) test prototype that was the first 4-axle locomotive to be powered by the new 645-series prime mover. The 433A served as the precursor to the EMD GP40. The 433A was purchased by the Illinois Central Railroad, and became the IC 3075. The 1965 EMD 433A has very little in common with the 1977 GP40X other than flared radiators and a 645-series prime mover.

== Original owners ==
EMD GP40X Locomotives
Railroad	Quantity	Road numbers	Truck Type	Notes
Atchison, Topeka and Santa Fe	10	3800-3809	Blomberg M	3800 Locotrol Master; 3801 Locotrol Receiver
Southern Pacific Railroad	2	7200-7201	HT-B	Locotrol Masters; Delivered with "Elephant ear" intake screens
Southern Pacific Railroad	2	7230-7231	HT-B	Locotrol Receivers; Delivered with "Elephant ear" intake screens
Southern Railway	3	SOU 7000-7002	Blomberg M	Hi-nose
Union Pacific Railroad	6	9000-9005	HT-B	
Electro-Motive Diesel	1	433A		
Totals	24			
