= Short hood =

Shorter of the two hoods on a locomotive

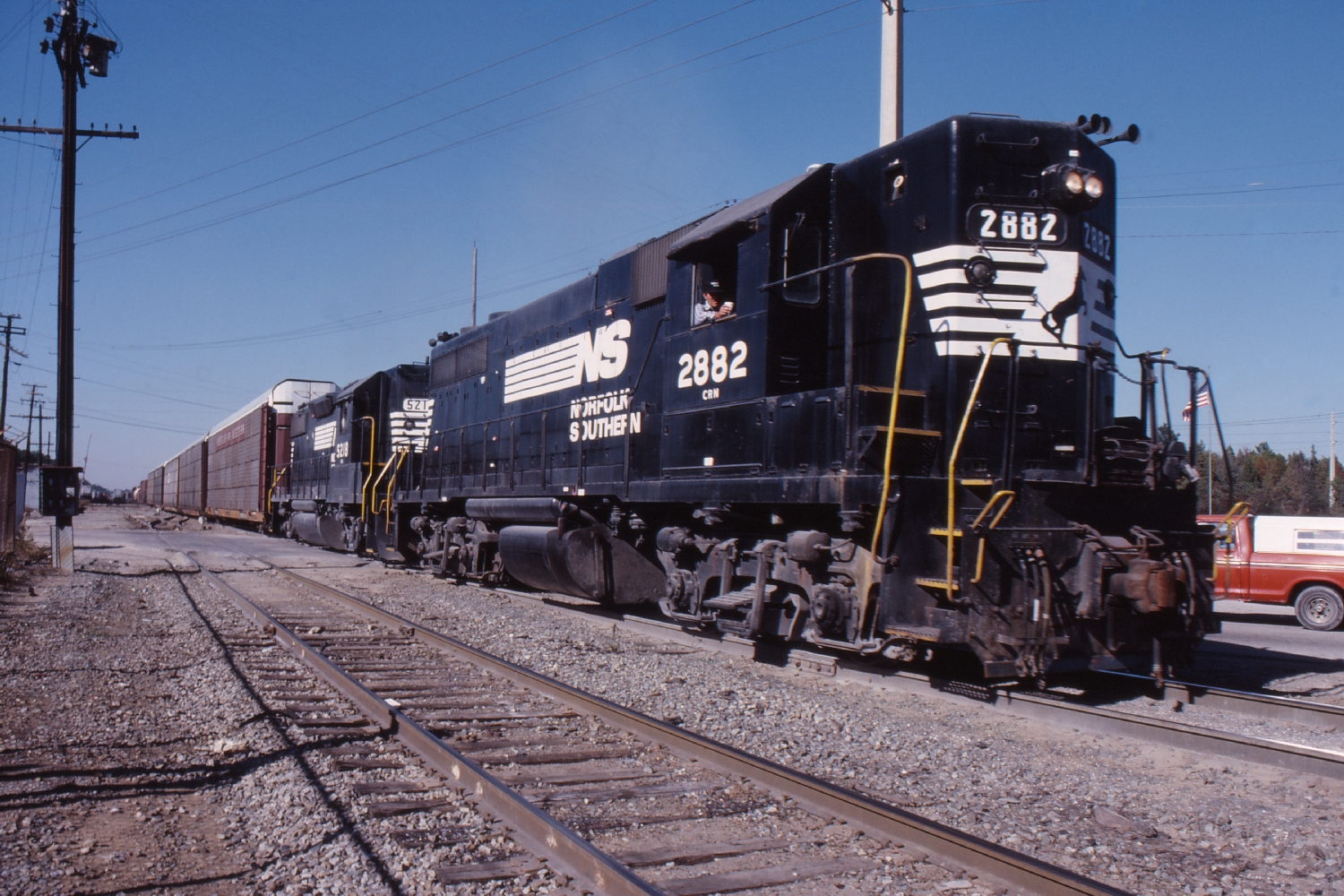
Two Norfolk Southern Railroad locomotives with high short hoods in 1987.

The short hood of a hood unit-style diesel locomotive is the shorter of the two hoods (narrower sections of the locomotive body in front and behind of the cab) on a locomotive. The short hood contains ancillary equipment, frequently a chemical-retention toilet for crew use, and may contain a steam generator for heating older-style passenger cars.

== Styles ==
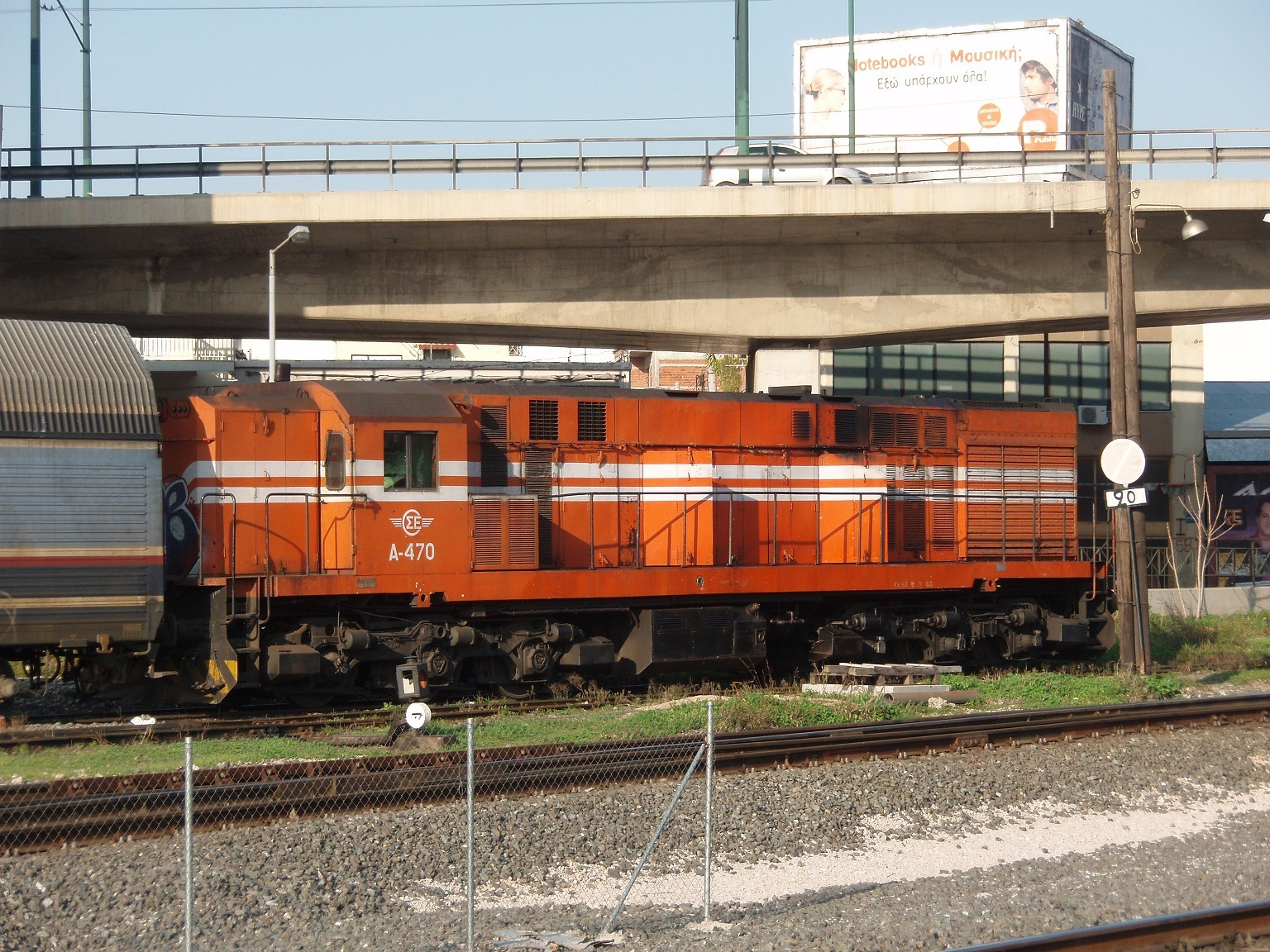
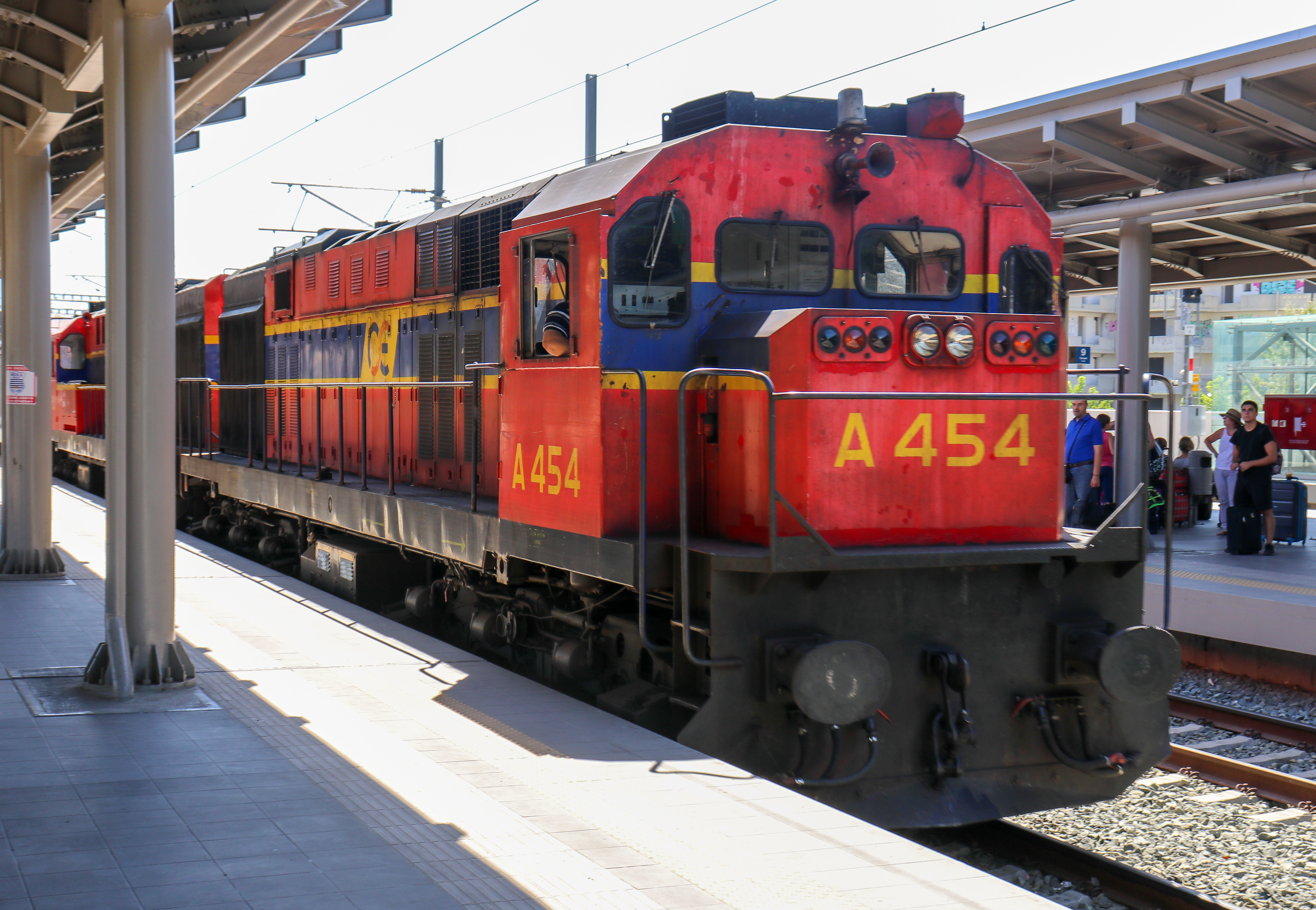
OSE Class A.451 with high short hood (prior to refurbishment) and low short hood (after refurbishment). Such modifications are commonly done to increase visibility.

=== High ===
Normally, the short hood is the front of the locomotive, and may be referred to as the locomotive's "nose". Originally, this was not the case; railroads preferred to have the long hood leading, for additional crew protection in a collision, and because it was the familiar mode of operating steam locomotives. The requirement for increased visibility conflicted with this and ultimately gained precedence. Many locomotives originally had a short hood the full height of the locomotive (a high short hood). This gave extra equipment room and was often used to house a steam generator.

=== Low ===
Once the short hood was established as the front of the locomotive, manufacturers began to offer a low short hood (also referred to as the "standard cab" or "spartan cab" design), which was below the level of the locomotive's cab windows and allowed for center windows for better forward visibility. They are commonly referred to as the "nose" of the locomotive now. Many older locomotives were modified to have a low short hood and were referred to as chop-nosed.

=== Full width ===
More recently, it has become the standard for the locomotive's nose to be built full-width, instead of having a narrow short hood. This is officially known as a "safety cab" (sometimes "Canadian safety cab" since Canadian railroads were the first to specify these) and is often, but inaccurately, described as "wide cab" by railfans and others (the cab is no wider; it is the nose or short hood that is wider; therefore the term wide-nose cab should be used).

== Great Britain ==
In Britain, almost all locomotives have two cabs, however some older English Electric or British Railways designs have extended cabs with a strong resemblance to a "short hood" at both ends (usually referred to as the "nose" or "bucket"). Examples include the Class 37, Class 40, Class 45 and Class 55. Some single cab designs did have American-style short and long hoods (known as "bonnets" in Britain). Examples include the Class 15 and Class 16.

== See also ==
- Long hood
