= Norfolk Southern GP33ECO =

EMD GP33ECO
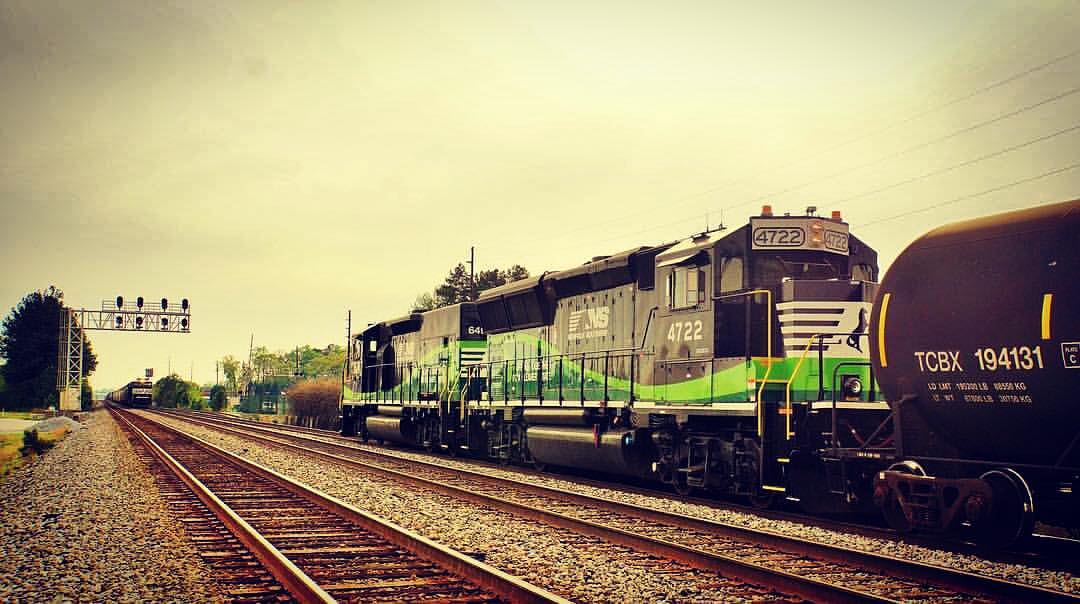
- EMD GP33ECO Norfolk Southern 4722 powers a freight train, with a RP-M4C at the lead. This unit was later renumbered to 6722.
Type and origin
- Power type: Diesel
- Builder: Norfolk Southern Railway
- Build date: 2014
- Rebuilder: Altoona Works
- Number rebuilt: 30
Specifications
- Configuration
  - AAR: B-B
  - UIC: Bo′Bo′
- Gauge: 4 ft 8 1/2 in (1,435 mm)
- Prime mover: 12N-710G3B-T3
- RPM range: 900-950
- Engine type: diesel
- Aspiration: Turbocharged
- Displacement: 8520 cu in
- Alternator: AR15CA6-D14
- Traction motors: 4 D87B
- Cylinders: 12
- Cylinder size: 710 cu in
- Transmission: electric
- MU working: AAR
- Loco brake: pneumatic, dynamic
Performance figures
- Power output: 3,000 horsepower (2,200 kW) (software limited)
- Tractive effort: 64,200 lbs
Career
- Numbers: 6700-6729 (formerly 4700-4729)
- Current owner: Norfolk Southern
- Disposition: Renumbered to 6700 series locomotives to clear the roster for new rebuilt AC44C6Ms

The EMD GP33ECO is a 4-axle diesel-electric locomotive built by the Norfolk Southern Railway in its Juniata Locomotive Shop. The locomotive is a rebuild of the EMD GP50 designed to meet Tier 3 emissions standards. The first locomotive was completed in January 2015. The rebuild was funded in part by the federal Congestion Mitigation and Air Quality Improvement Program.
