= CP Class 1500 =

Class 1500
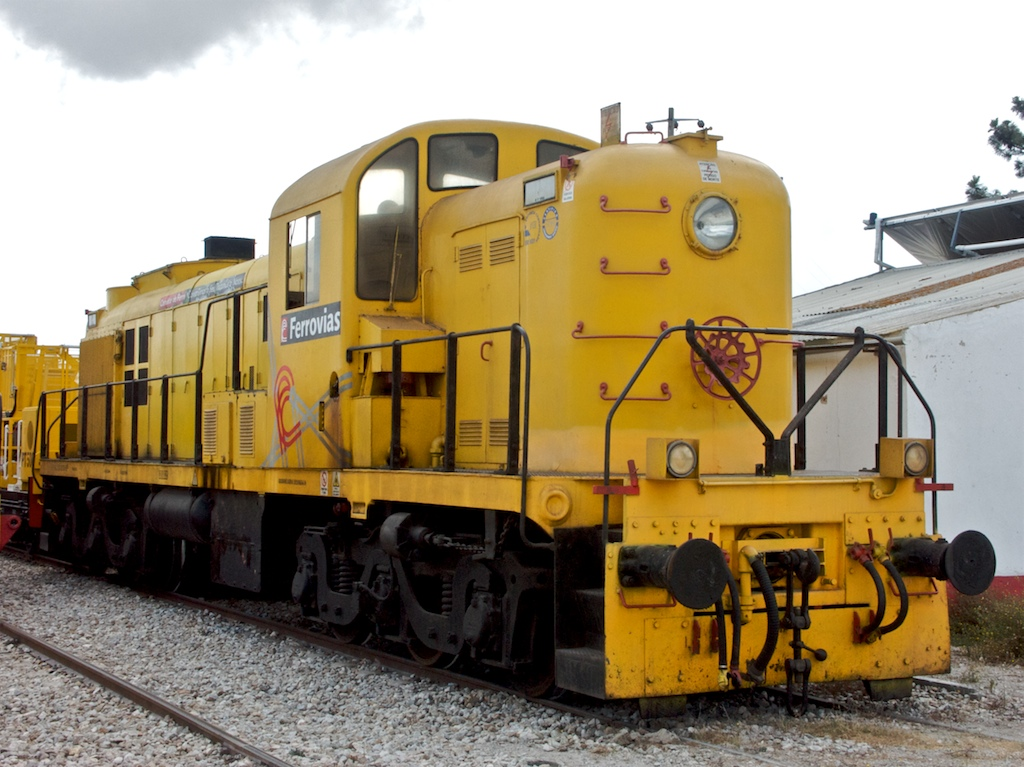
- Locomotive 1512 at Poceirão, painted in the yellow livery of private operator Ferrovias
Type and origin
- Builder: ALCO
- Model: RSC-2
- Total produced: 12
Specifications
- Configuration
  - AAR: A1A-A1A
- Gauge: 1,668 mm (5 ft 5 21/32 in)
Performance figures
- Maximum speed: 120 km/h (75 mph)
- Power output: 1,500 hp (1,100 kW)
Career
- Operators: Comboios de Portugal
- Class: Série 1500
- Numbers: 1501-1512
- Locale: Portugal
- First run: 1948

The Série 1500 of the Portuguese Railways were introduced in 1948,< making them amongst the first main line diesel locomotives to be used in Europe. These 12 locomotives were built in the United States by ALCO, to the constructor's type RSC-2 specification. The locomotives were purchased with assistance from Marshall Aid funds in an attempt to cut the railway's running costs, modernise the system and help alleviate Portugal's shortage of coal following World War II.

They remained in service with CP until approximately 2000. 64 years after construction. Some still survive (as of 2012) with private operators and one locomotive is preserved at Portugal's National Railway Museum at Entroncamento.
