= Comfort cab =

Locomotive design

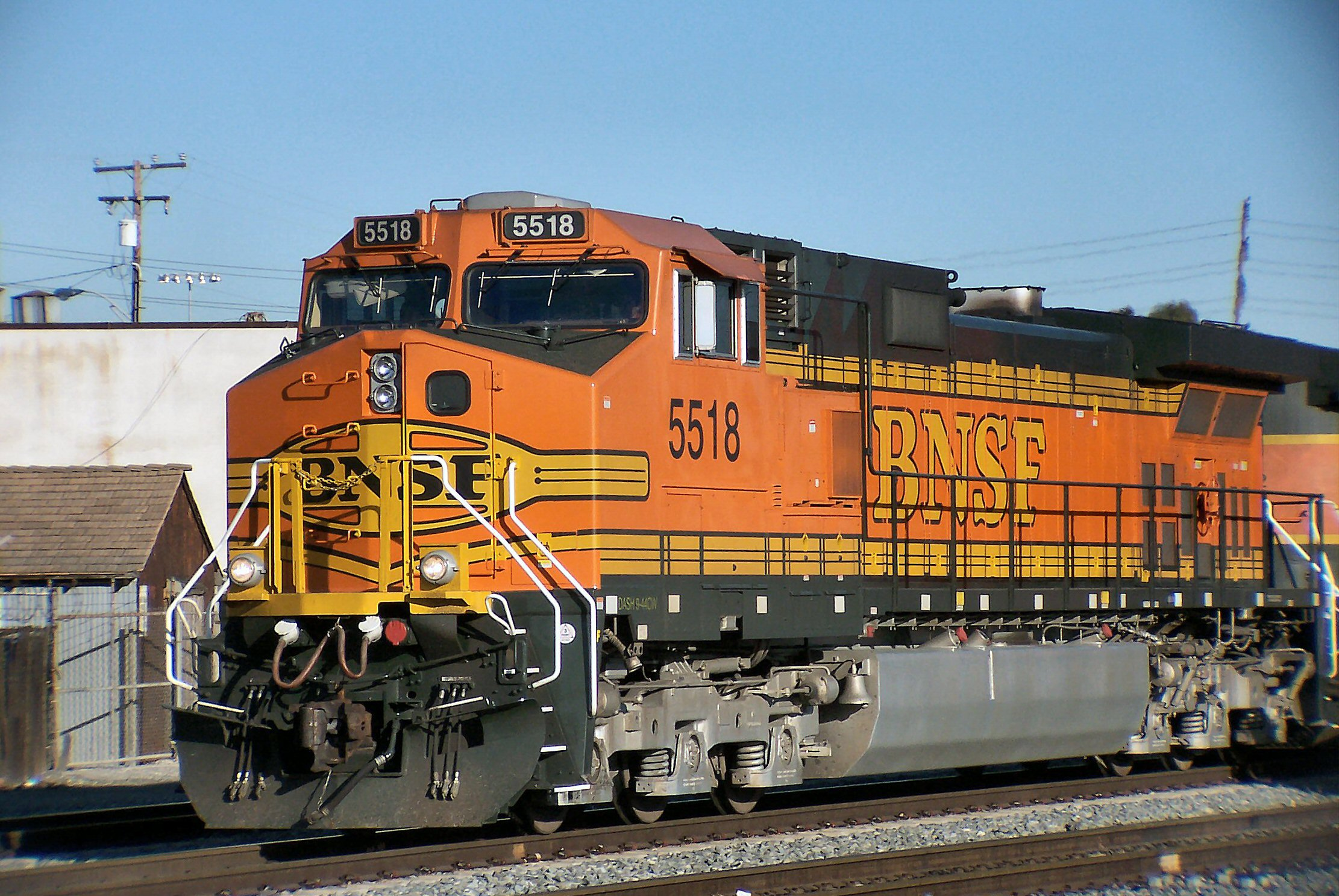
A BNSF GE Dash 9-44CW, a modern comfort cab locomotive

A comfort cab is a design found on most modern North American diesel locomotives, and some export models. The broad nose occupies the entire width of the locomotive, and typically has an access door on the front of the nose.

The design may also be called a Canadian comfort cab, a North American safety cab, wide-nose, or a wide cab (although the term wide cab is somewhat of a misnomer because it is the nose, not the cab, that is widened).

== History ==
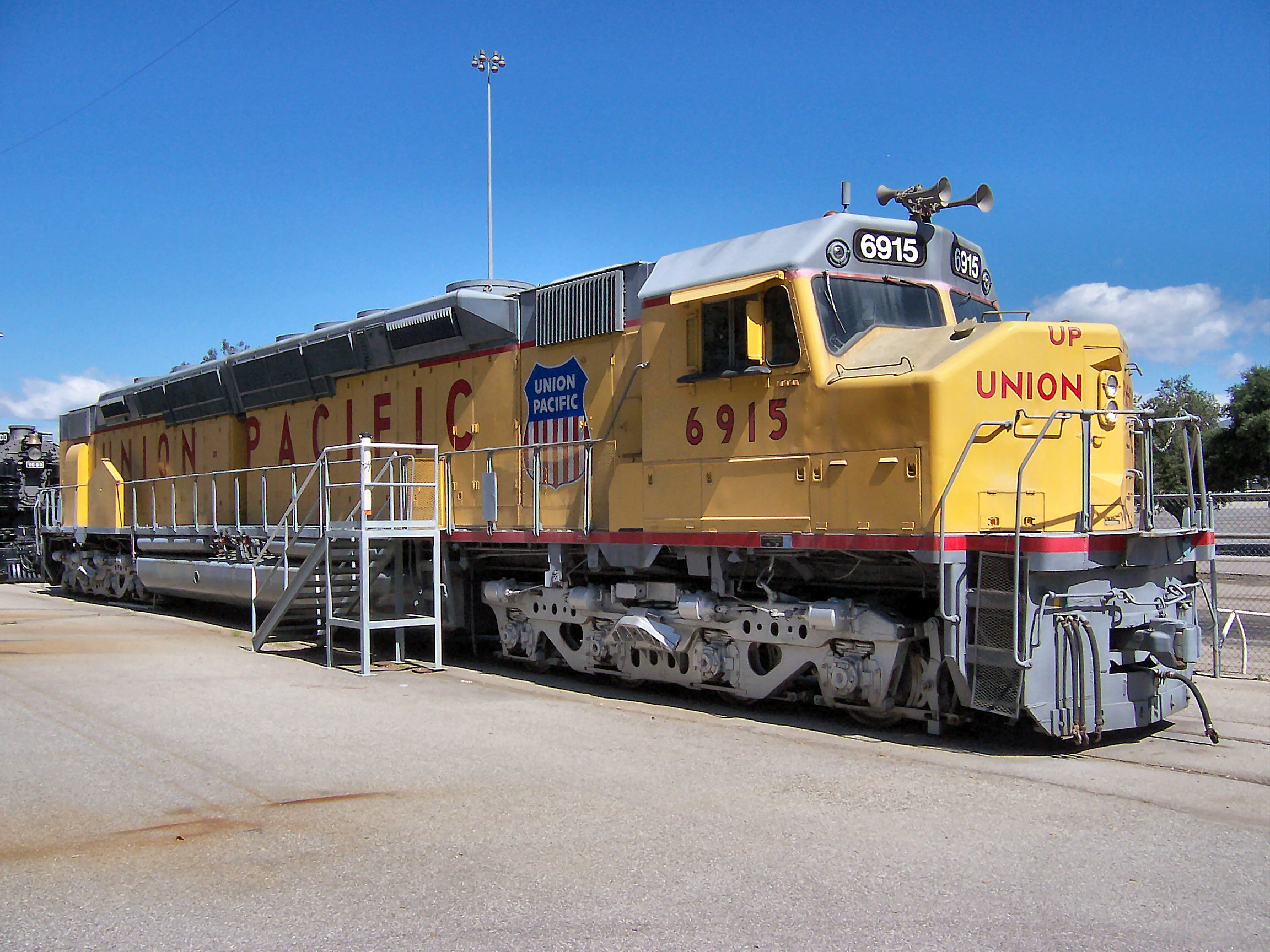
A Union Pacific DDA40X showing the precursor to the comfort cab

A Canadian National GP38-2(W), the first locomotive model to use the comfort cab design

The basic shape of the comfort cab design first appeared on a hood unit, the EMD DDA40X, in 1969. It was the same design as the F45 and FP45 cowl units being built by EMD at the time. The cab used on the DDA40X was not a true "Safety cab" because it consisted mainly of restyled sheet metal and lacked the structural reinforcements of the Canadian design.

The first true "Safety cabs" were designed and built for the Canadian National Railway by input from railway employees. The locomotives were GP38-2s, GP40-2s and GP40-2Ls, and SD40-2s. To denote the comfort cab locomotives, a "W" was often applied at the end of the model name (i.e. GP38-2W, GP40-2W, SD40-2W), although this was not an official designation. The Montreal Locomotive Works also offered a competitive cab design on their M-420 and M-630(W) models. EMD began offering the comfort cab as a standard option instead of a custom build option in 1988.

== Features ==
The comfort cab design has a number of features to improve crew safety and comfort.

=== Safety ===
The modern comfort cab design is usually built with a specially reinforced nose. Instead of sheet metal, 3/8-inch-thick (9.5 mm) steel is employed with additional reinforcement behind the armor. As a moving locomotive frequently cannot stop in time to prevent collisions, these enhancements protect the crew in collisions with objects smaller than the train itself, such as downed trees or stopped automobiles. In addition, the windows of the cab meet Federal Railroad Administration Regulations Part 223, which states that windows must withstand the impact of a .22 caliber bullet or a cinder block at 55 mph (89 km/h).

=== Comfort ===
The comfort cab design provides more space for the crew. It has significantly more open space than standard cabs, allowing crew members space to move about. In later years, the cab doors had improved weatherstripping and electrically heated windows installed. Many new EMD locomotives include the feature of the "Whisper Cab", a cab that is acoustically isolated from the rest of the locomotive.
