= EMD SD45T-2 =

Class of diesel-electric locomotive

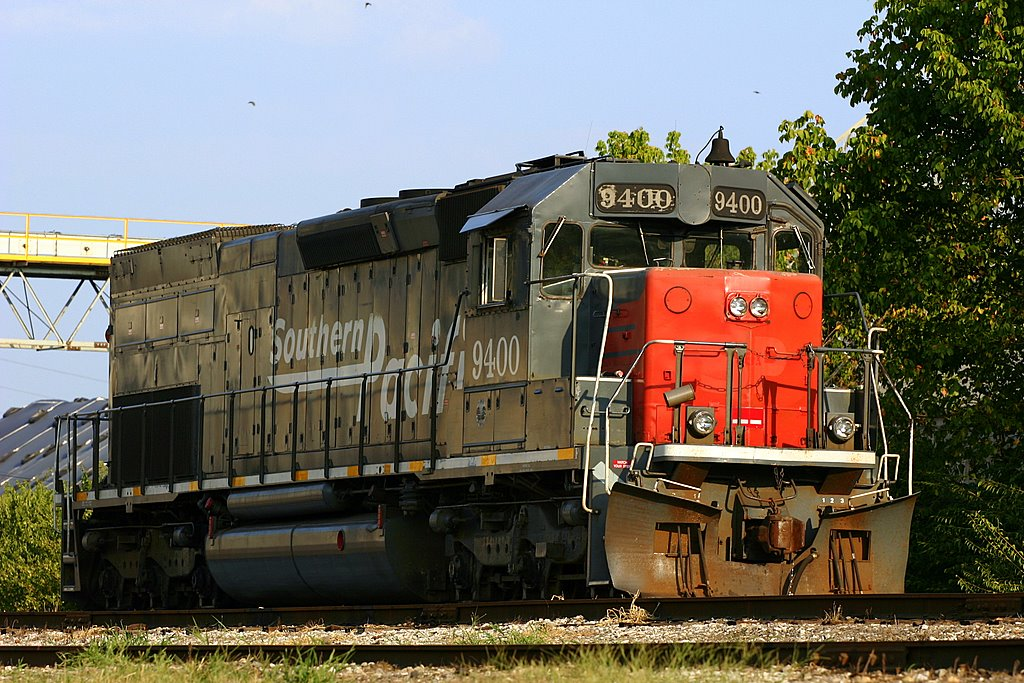
- Indiana and Ohio Railroad #9400, still in Southern Pacific colors
Type and origin
- Power type: Diesel-electric
- Builder: General Motors Electro-Motive Division (EMD)
- Model: SD45T-2
- Build date: February 1972 – June 1975
- Total produced: 247
Specifications
- Configuration
  - AAR: C-C
- Gauge: 4 ft 8 1/2 in (1,435 mm) standard gauge
- Length: 70 ft 8 in (21.54 m)
- Fuel capacity: 4,400 US gal (16,700 L; 3,660 imp gal)
- Prime mover: EMD 20-645E3
- Engine type: V20 diesel engine
- Cylinders: 20
Performance figures
- Power output: 3,600 hp (2,680 kW)
Career
- Nicknames: "tunnel motor"
- Disposition: many still in service as of 2010; one donated to California State Railroad Museum

The SD45T-2 is a model of diesel-electric locomotive built by EMD for the Southern Pacific Railroad. Like the later SD40T-2 it is colloquially nicknamed a tunnel motor. 247 total units (including the original EMD/SP joint-venture prototype) were produced from February 1972 to June 1975, including 84 for SP's subsidiary Cotton Belt. From April 1986 to December 1989, 126 were rebuilt and re-designated as SD45T-2R, including 24 for Cotton Belt.

The SD45T-2 is a variant of the SD45-2 that featured the "Dash 2" upgrade components such as improved electronics and high traction trucks, with the "T" denoting its cooling system modifications. The intake for radiator cooling air was moved to the walkway level and the cooling fans themselves were under the radiator cores, instead of above. Tunnel motors were built for mountainous areas in the western United States, where SP had previously encountered repeated overheating issues on their SD45s.

The later SD40T-2 looks similar to the SD45T-2. One spotting difference is the longer hood on the SD45T-2 to accommodate the V20 prime mover vs. the V16 used on the SD40T-2. The SD45T-2's cab is further forward on the frame, so there is less "front porch". This mimics the differences between the SD45-2 and the SD40-2. Another spotting difference is the SD45T-2's three fan access doors on each side above the cooling air intake, while the SD40T-2 has two.

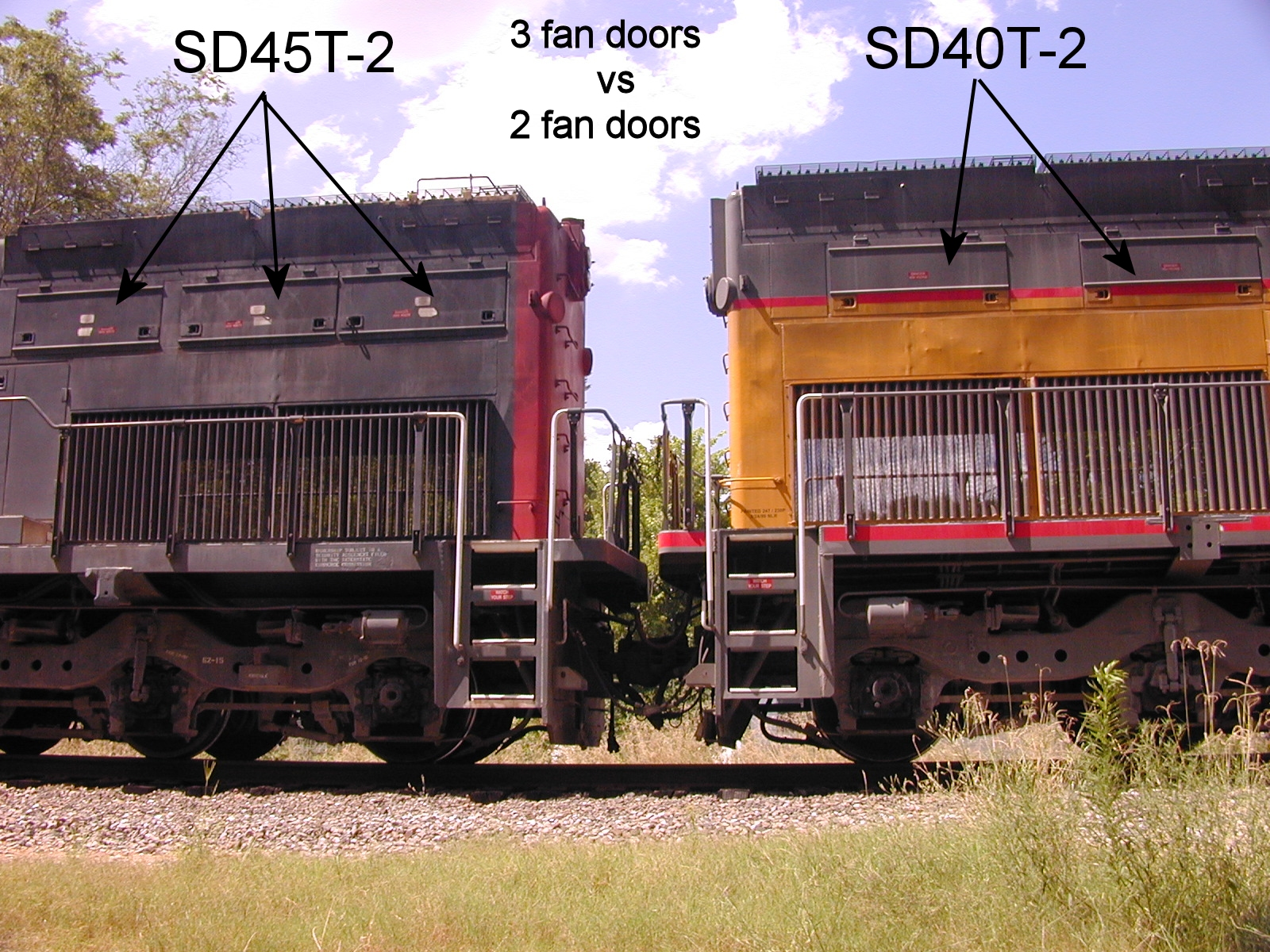
EMD SD45T-2 vs SD40T-2 radiator fan motor access doors

Like their SD40T-2, some of SP's SD45T-2 tunnel motors were obtained by Kansas City Southern Railway, Bessemer and Lake Erie Railroad, Duluth, Missabe and Iron Range Railway, and by the Union Pacific Railroad when it merged the SP in 1996. Cotton Belt 9385 was purchased by Americana Latina Logistica and exported to Brazil.

Some SD45T-2s were rebuilt and designated to SD45T-3, SD40T-3 and SD40-2T. In addition, some locomotive leasing companies own the SD45 tunnel motor locomotives. They are scattered all over North America and are an increasingly rare sight.

== Rebuilds ==
=== SD45T-2R ===
Starting in the 1986, the Southern Pacific Transportation Company and the St. Louis Southwestern Railway (also known as the "Cotton Belt Route") had begun rebuilding the majority of their EMD SD45T-2 locomotives into what had become the EMD SD45T-2R. Both railroads had rebuilt a total of 126 of their EMD SD45T-2 locomotives into EMD SD45T-2R locomotives, which left a total of 121 EMD SD45T-2 un-rebuilt and they were all renumbered as 6793–6832, 6834–6868 and 6869–6892.

== Original owners ==
Railroad	Number of engines	Roster numbers	Notes
Southern Pacific	163	9166–9260, 9302–9370	SP 9314 is the rebuild of the wrecked SP 9220. 9340 was wrecked in the 1989 Cajon Pass Runaway and scrapped.
St. Louis Southwestern (Cotton Belt)	84	9157–9165, 9261–9301, 9371–9404	SSW 9389 was the 600th "45" Series unit delivered to the Southern Pacific System by EMD and wore Bicentennial colors
Totals	247		

== Preservation ==
- Southern Pacific SD45T-2R #6819 (originally 9193) is preserved at the California State Railroad Museum in Sacramento, California. It was donated by Union Pacific in December 2001.
