= San Bernardino train disaster =

1989 train crash and subsequent oil pipeline rupture in California

1989 San Bernardino train wreck and pipeline rupture
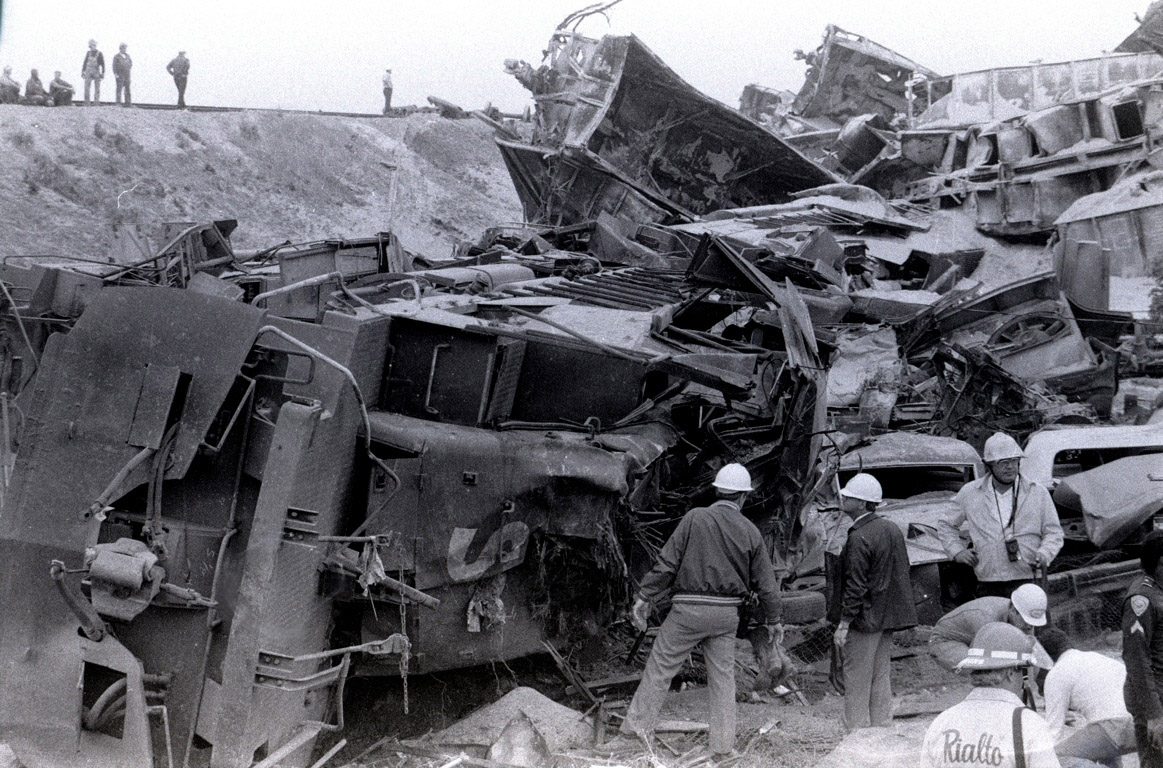
- A destroyed locomotive and hopper cars following the derailment.

Details
- Date: May 12, 1989; 37 years ago 7:36 a.m. PDT
- Location: San Bernardino, California, United States
- Coordinates: 34°08′15″N 117°20′39″W
- Country: United States
- Line: Cajon Pass
- Operator: Southern Pacific
- Incident type: Runaway train, derailment, and subsequent pipeline explosion
- Cause: Train derailment: Train weight miscalculated and several locomotives with inoperative dynamic brakes. Pipeline rupture: undetected damage to pipeline during cleanup

Statistics
- Trains: 1 (SP 7551 East)
- Crew: 5
- Deaths: 6 (4 by derailment, 2 by pipeline)
- Injured: 4

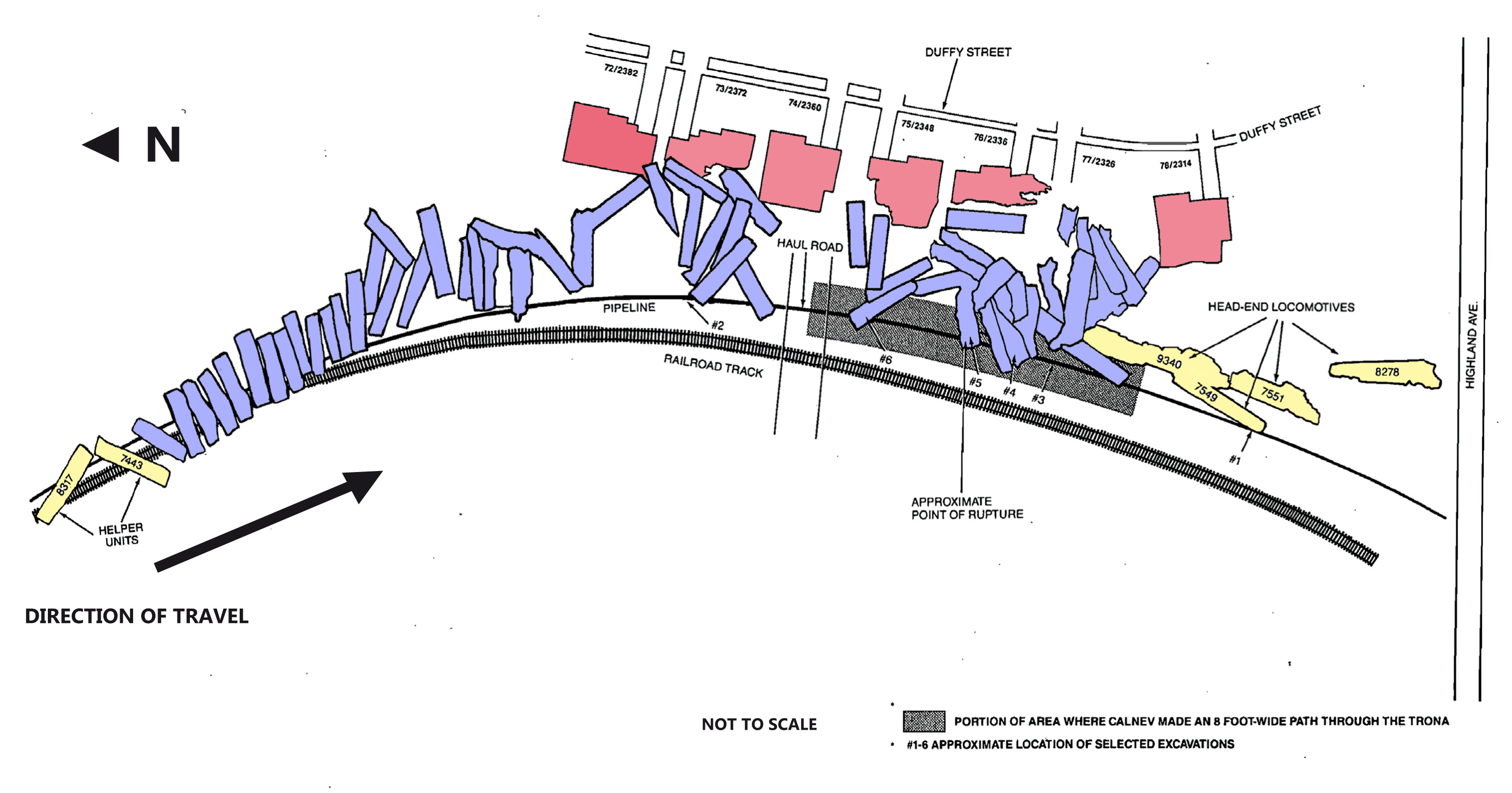
Sketch of the accident site

The San Bernardino train disaster (sometimes known as the Duffy Street incident or the 1989 Cajon Pass Runaway) was a combination of two separate but related incidents that occurred in San Bernardino, California, United States: a runaway train derailment on May 12, 1989; and the subsequent failure on May 25, 1989, of the Calnev Pipeline, a petroleum pipeline adjacent to the tracks which was damaged by earth-moving equipment during the crash cleanup.

== Train derailment ==
On May 12, 1989, at 7:36 a.m., a 6-locomotive/69-car Southern Pacific freight train (SP 7551 East, computer symbol 1 MJLBP-11) transporting trona lost control while descending Cajon Pass, derailed on an elevated curve and plowed into a residential area on Duffy Street. The location is just northeast of where the 210 Foothill Freeway crosses the Lytle Creek wash.

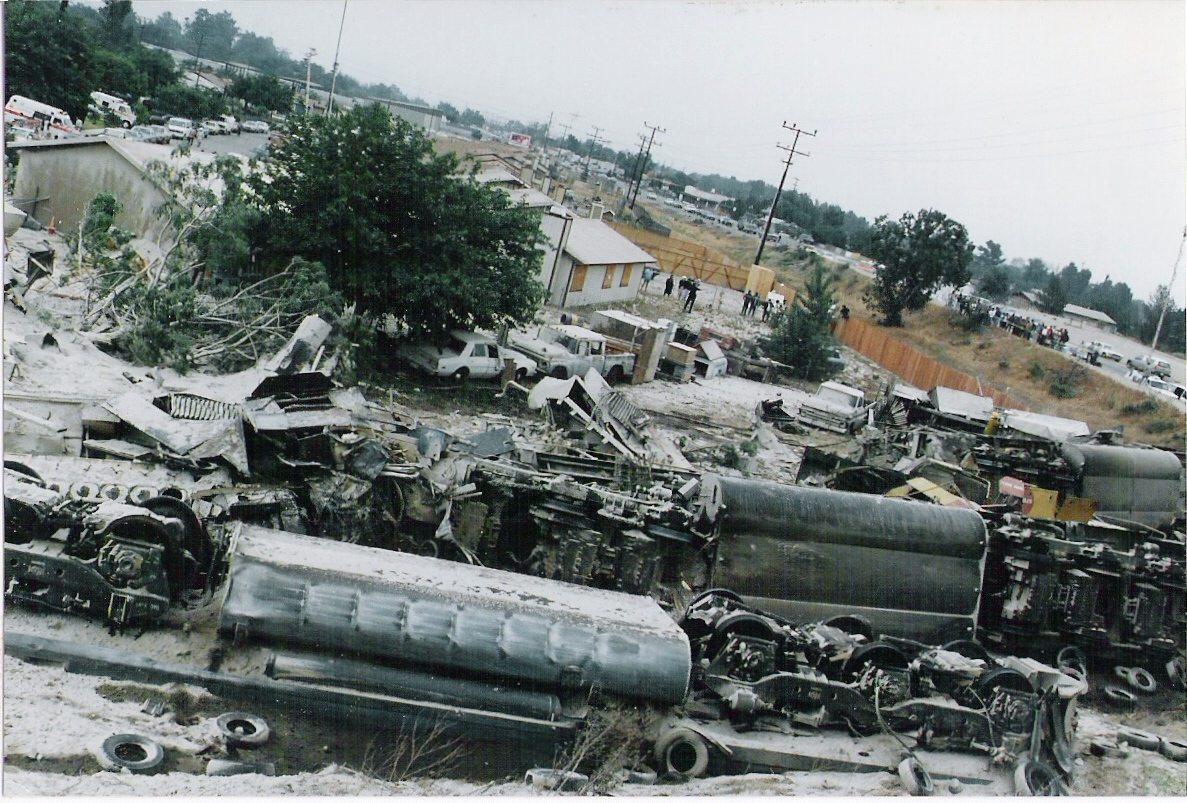
Locomotives

The conductor, head-end brakeman, and two residents were killed in the wreck. Seven houses on the street immediately next to the tracks were demolished by the wreck, as were the lead locomotives and all of the freight cars. Clerks in Mojave had miscalculated the weight of the train, while the engineer and crew at the head end were unaware that one of the rear helper engines had inoperative dynamic brakes. Hence there was not enough dynamic braking force available to maintain control of train speed during the descent. When the helper engineer realized that the train speed was not being adequately controlled, he made an emergency brake application, which deactivated dynamic braking, resulting in a runaway condition. The train reached a speed of about 110 miles per hour (180 km/h) before jumping the tracks on an elevated curve that had a posted speed limit of 35 miles per hour (56 km/h) next to Duffy Street, sending the head-end locomotives and several cars off the high railroad bed and into houses on the street below, completely demolishing them.

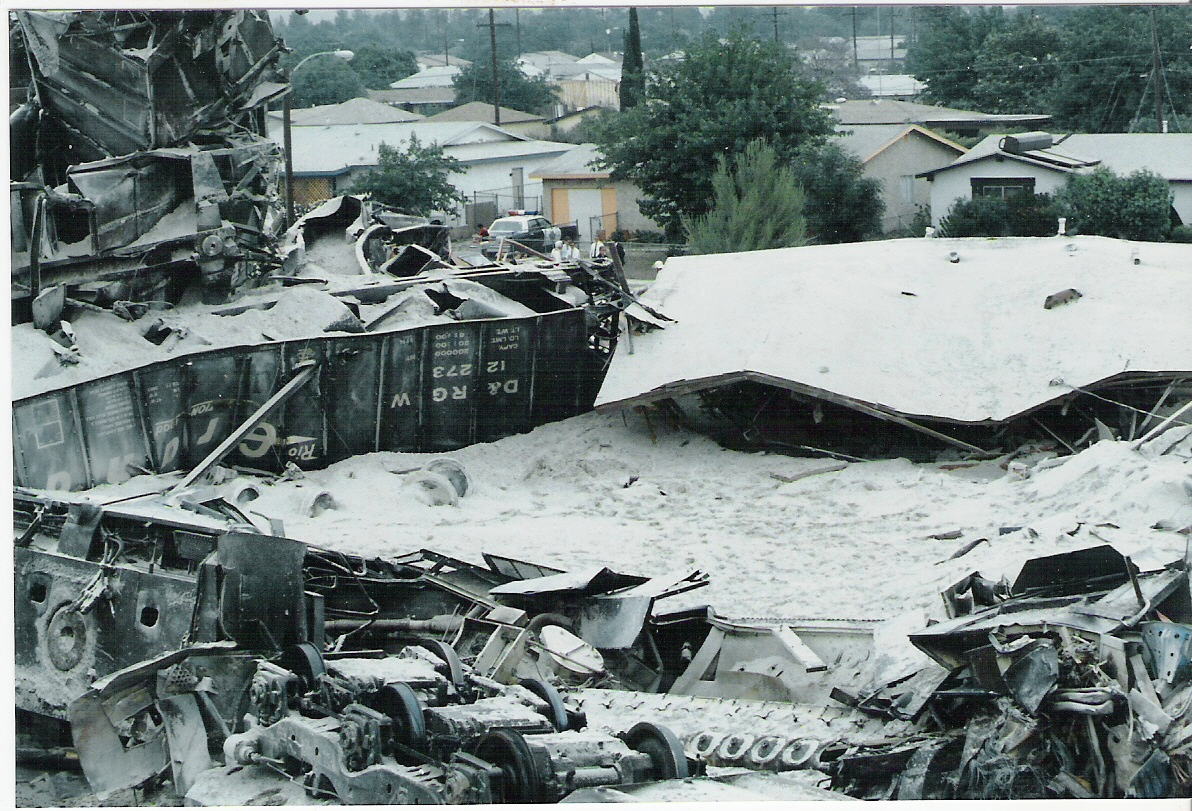
Buried house on Duffy St.

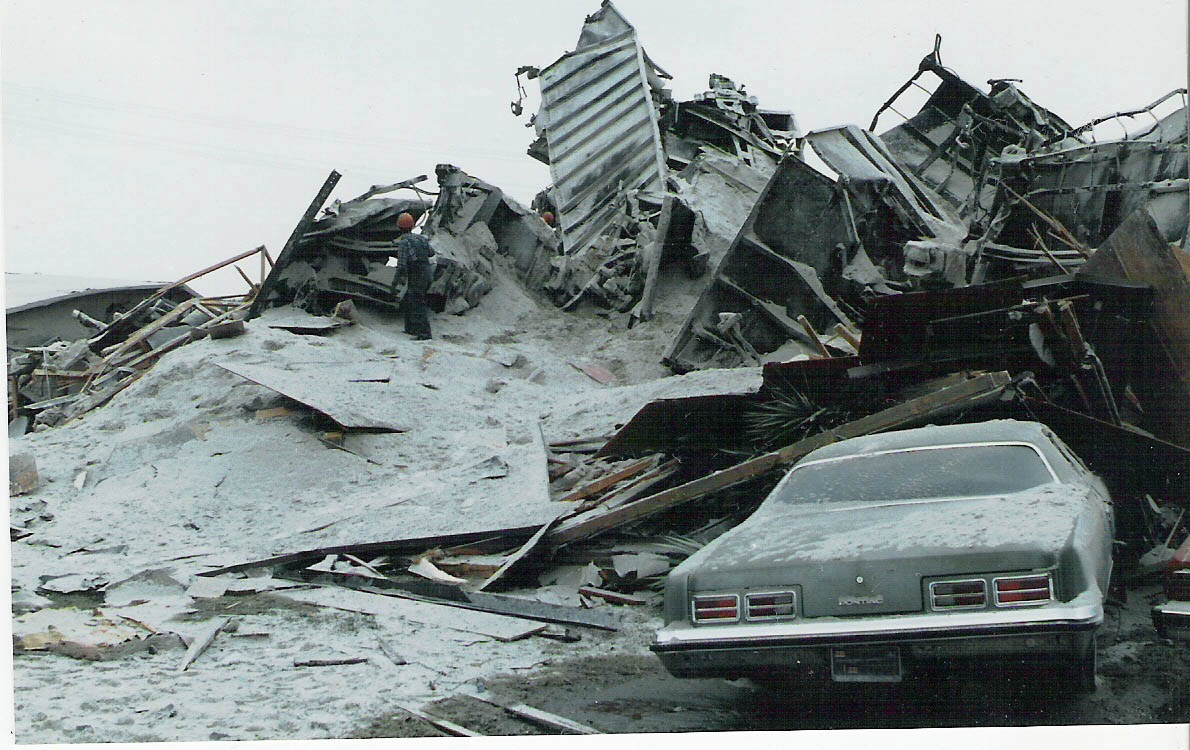
Destroyed house on Duffy St.

Data from the locomotives' "black boxes" (event recorders) showed that the third head end locomotive's dynamic brakes were not functioning at all, although the sound of the cooling fans misled crews into believing dynamic braking was functional. It was also determined after the wreck that the engineer operating the helper locomotives knew of the faulty dynamic brakes on one of his units, but did not communicate that information to the head end crew. The combination of weight miscalculation, poor communication and faulty brake equipment resulted in a total train weight that was too great to adequately control speed on the downhill grade. Once dynamic braking had been defeated by the helper engineer's emergency brake application, the enormous weight of the heavily loaded cars caused rapid acceleration that could not be resisted solely by mechanical braking. The train catapulted from the 35 mph curve next to Duffy Street at 110 mph, scattering locomotives and cars, as well as lading. Leading the train was Southern Pacific SD40T-2 8278, Southern Pacific SD45Rs 7551 and 7549, and Southern Pacific SD45T-2 9340, which were on the head end, 69 hopper cars loaded with trona, and Southern Pacific SD40T-2 8317 and Southern Pacific SD45R 7443 on the helper end.

=== Train and helper crews of Southern Pacific 7551 East ===
The crew that was called for train 7551 East were as follows:

- Frank Holland, Engineer (age 33)
- Everett Crown,† Conductor (age 35)
- Allan Riess,† Brakeman on 3rd locomotive (age 43)
- Lawrence Hill, Engineer on helper unit 7443 (age 42)
- Robert Waterbury, Brakeman on helper unit 7443 (age 57)

(†=Killed in the wreck.)

Killed in the wreck were Conductor Crown (fatally crushed in the nose of unit SP 8278) and Brakeman Riess (fatally crushed in the cab of unit SP 7549), along with two young boys, Jason Thompson (age 10 years) and Tyson White (age 7 years), who were crushed and asphyxiated when the train destroyed one of the houses on Duffy Street. One person, Chris Shaw, was trapped in one of the houses and was pulled out 13 hours after the accident, he had a broken leg.

Engineer Holland remained in his seat at the control stand in unit SP 8278 at the head of the train and suffered several cracked ribs along with a punctured lung. However, he was able to crawl out of his wrecked locomotive and was helped down by eyewitnesses on the scene. Engineer Hill and Brakeman Waterbury, who were in the helper locomotives, received minor injuries.

== Pipeline rupture and fire ==
Buried six feet underground alongside the track is a 14-inch high-pressure petroleum pipeline operated by Calnev Pipeline. The pipeline was marked with stakes during cleanup to avoid the risk of it being accidentally damaged. Pipeline officials remained on site as safety observers during the cleanup of the rail cars, but not during the cleanup of the trona material. Service on the track where the derailment happened was restored four days after the crash. Thirteen days after the train wreck on May 25, 1989, at 8:05 a.m., shortly after eyewitnesses heard a train pass through the derailment site, the pipeline burst at a point on the curve where the derailment happened, showering the neighborhood with gasoline, which ignited into a large fire that burned for close to seven hours and emitted a plume of flames three hundred feet into the air. By the time the fire was out, it had fatally burned two people, and destroyed eleven more houses and 21 cars. Of the houses destroyed, five were directly across the street from houses that had been destroyed in the derailment, while another was the only house on the track side of Duffy Street to have been spared damage during the derailment. Four more houses received moderate smoke and fire damage, while three others had only smoke damage. The total property damage was US$14.3 million (equivalent to $37.1 million in 2025), with more of this damage resulting from the fire than from the train derailment, although there were more fatalities from the derailment.

== Aftermath ==
Attempts to have the Calnev pipeline kept shut off after its failure were unsuccessful.

Many residents received settlements from Southern Pacific and/or Calnev and moved after this disaster. The plots on the south side of Duffy Street closest to the rail line were rezoned as open space by the city so they would not be rebuilt. Other nearby plots which could be redeveloped sat empty for years, though as of 2016, at least three houses had been rebuilt there.

Southern Pacific also changed its cargo weight procedures, which required that the clerks assume that every freight car on every train was carrying the maximum load it was designed to carry if the submitted paperwork did not indicate a weight. By assuming the maximum weight of the train, that would guarantee that the dispatcher would assign at least the minimum number of locomotives needed to ensure that the train would have enough braking capacity needed to keep the train under control on steep grades.

Seven years after the accident, Southern Pacific was bought up by Union Pacific, which still runs trains over the rails where the derailment happened.

=== Disposal of the train's equipment ===
SP #8278, SP #7551, SP #7549 and SP #9340 were damaged beyond repair. They were sold for parts to Precision National and scrapped at the crash site.

Both helper units derailed, but were still operable. SP 8317 was sold to Precision National, repaired, then resold to Helm Leasing for continued service. It was scrapped in 2013. SP #7443 was repaired and repainted by SP and returned to service. It was finally retired on March 17, 2000 and sold to National Railway Equipment Company, who rebuilt it with 5′6″ gauge trucks for MRS Logística (in Brazil) #5313-1.

All 69 hopper cars were destroyed and scrapped at the crash site.

As a result of this and other runaway incidents involving locomotives with dynamic braking, the Federal Railroad Administration reversed its mandate that dynamic braking be disabled when train brakes are placed in emergency. The mandate now is that they must all remain functional.

== Investigation ==
=== Part 1: Train derailment ===
Much of the NTSB's investigation into the two disasters was focused on the activities surrounding the derailment.

SP MJLBP1-11 was carrying trona that had been mined and loaded onto the freight cars for shipment to a buyer. The shipment would move by rail to the Port of Los Angeles, then by ship to Colombia, South America. This would be the second such shipment. The buyer had purchased 6,900 tons of trona; thus the mining company, Lake Minerals, contracted for 69 100-ton coal hopper cars (which had a combination of D&RGW and SP reporting marks), which were to be loaded by an outside contractor at Rosamond. When the mining company turned in the final contract to the clerk (Thomas Blair) for the bill of lading, they had not filled in any weight, under the assumption that the railroad would know that they had filled the 100-ton cars to capacity. The clerk filled in the bill of lading as 60 tons per hopper car, going by a visual comparison of 100 tons of coal. As a result, the train was listed as weighing about 6,151 tons total (2,011 tons from the freight cars themselves, 4,140 tons of cargo), significantly lighter than its actual weight (Warren, 3).

At 9:00 p.m. on May 11, a three-man crew consisting of Frank Holland, an engineer; Everett Crown, a conductor; and Allan Riess, a brakeman, were brought on duty at SP's Bakersfield yard. They were transported by company van to Mojave to take charge of a three-unit set of locomotives, consisting of SP 7551, SP 7549 (both EMD SD45R units) and SP 9340 (an EMD SD45T-2). While at Mojave, the crew obtained the necessary paperwork for their train, including a Car and Tonnage Profile (a printout generated by SP's TOPS computer system that showed, among other things, the assumed train weight of 6,151 tons). Upon boarding the locomotives, it was discovered that the head unit, #7551, was dead and could not be started. The crew was then instructed to take unit SP 8278 (an EMD SD40T-2 "Tunnel Motor") from another consist and add it to theirs, ahead of the dead 7551.

The crew departed Mojave at 12:15 a.m. on May 12, and headed south (railroad direction east) approximately three miles to Fleta, where they were to pick up the 69 freight cars. Due to maintenance equipment being parked on the track at the south end of the Fleta siding, it was necessary for the train crew to pick up the cars from the north end, take them back to Mojave and run around them, before heading south to Palmdale, where it was originally intended to pick up an additional helper that would be placed on the rear of the train to aid in braking after cresting Cajon Pass.

After a shift change in the train dispatcher's office, the new dispatcher correctly recalculated the tonnage of the train to be approximately 8,900 tons, based on his previous experience with these types of moves. Braking ability diminishes exponentially for every degree of grade – at a 2.2% grade, the dynamic brakes of one fully operational locomotive was capable of maintaining the speed of 1,700 to 1,800 tons of weight (either in freight cars or freight) at a speed of 25 miles per hour (40 km/h). Dynamic braking ability is most effective near a speed of 25 miles per hour (40 km/h) and diminishes if the train travels slower or faster than this optimal speed, so engineers try to maintain speeds between 25–30 miles per hour (40–48 km/h) on steep grades. The dispatcher determined that they would need the dynamic brakes of 5.23 functional engines (6 total) to maintain this optimal speed between 25 and 30 miles per hour (40 and 48 km/h), so picking up only the one additional helper locomotive at Palmdale, as originally planned, would not provide sufficient dynamic braking effort for the 2.2% grade on the west side of Cajon Pass where the derailment happened, so instead of adding the single unit at Palmdale, the dispatcher ordered a two-unit helper set dispatched from the helper pool in West Colton, California.

Consequently, at 1:30 a.m. on May 12, a crew consisting of Lawrence Hill, an engineer, and Robert Waterbury, a brakeman (acting in a position known as a "lookout") was brought on duty at West Colton and transported by company van to Dike (located at Devore), where they boarded a two-unit helper locomotive consisting of units SP #7443 (an EMD SD45R) and SP 8317 (another EMD SD40T-2 Tunnel Motor). Their instructions were to first help a northbound train (timetable westward) up the hill to Oban, then bring MJLBP-11 back down Cajon Pass to West Colton.

The two critical factors in this runaway and subsequent derailment were the incorrect train tonnage provided to the crew, and the lack of fully operative dynamic brakes on all but two of the locomotives between the head-end and helper locomotives.

Each hopper car had wheels that were equipped with an ordinary air brake. Critical parts of the air brakes consist of metal shoes that create friction by pressing against the wheel treads when the air brakes are activated. The slower a wheel moves, the more easily friction can induce slowing traction instead of heat. The faster a wheel moves, the more difficult friction is converted to braking power versus heat. Thus, air brakes work optimally when traveling at speeds under 25 miles per hour (40 km/h) as this is the speed at which traction is obtained more than heat via the input of friction between the shoes and the wheels. The air brakes on MJLBP-11's fully loaded hopper cars (100 tons each on a 2.2% grade) had only a limited effect on the braking potential of the train, becoming exponentially weaker and hotter as the speed of the train increased.

The second locomotive in the head-end set, SP 7551, since it was dead-in-tow, did not have operative dynamic brakes, just air brakes. The event recorder downloaded from unit SP 7549 (the third locomotive), showed that it was producing traction current in motoring but no current in dynamic braking. The dynamic brakes of the fourth locomotive, SP 9340, operated sporadically and were of limited use. Unit SP 8317 (of the two-unit helper engine set coupled to the rear of the train) also did not have an operative dynamic brake. Thus, among the four locomotives in front and the set of helpers on the end, only SP 8278 at the front of the train and SP 7443 at the back of the train had fully functioning dynamic brakes. This information was not passed on to the train dispatcher. The train engineer knew only that the second unit of the head-end consist (SP 7551) had no brakes, but believed he had more than sufficient dynamic brakes to maintain the speed of 6,151 tons (as was still listed in the cargo manifest) because 6,151 tons would only require the dynamic braking effort of five engines. With a true weight of 8,900 tons, however, the train would have needed the functioning dynamic brakes of at least six or seven engines (with moderate dependence on the air brakes), or five engines (with a heavy input from the air brakes) in order to maintain control.

As soon as the train crested the apex of the grade at Hiland and started downgrade on the south side of Cajon Pass, it became apparent to Holland at the head end that he was having trouble controlling the speed of the train. When he realized that the train was gathering too much speed, he did all he could to control the train speed using the train's air brakes and the dynamic brakes of the lead locomotives, and asked the helper engine's engineer to do as much as he could to help also, not knowing that he had only one working dynamic brake in his set. As a last attempt to stop the train, the helper engineer initiated an emergency brake application from his helper locomotive, but this ended up disabling all of the dynamic brakes on the train, allowing the train to pick up speed. After the activation of the emergency brake, the only brakes which were operational were the air brakes, which were now melting from the friction and heat. When the NTSB investigators arrived at the crash site (about twelve hours after the accident), they observed that the wheels had gotten so hot that they had started to expand off the wheel axles by the time they left the rails.

The train was traveling at a calculated speed of 110 miles per hour (180 km/h) when it entered a four-degree curve just north of the Highland Avenue overpass which had a maximum authorized speed of 35 miles per hour (56 km/h) and derailed, plowing into the houses on the outside of the curve. All but one of the houses on the side of Duffy Street nearer the tracks were destroyed. The one house on that side of the street that was spared damage during the derailment was destroyed in the pipeline rupture. Six hundred and eighty feet of track were also destroyed in the wreck.

The NTSB report determined that if the train had started down the hill at a speed lower than 15 miles per hour (24 km/h), it might have been possible for the crew to regain control of their train and brakes. It was also discovered that the SP's engineer training program did not have any material on how to regain control of a runaway train, and the railroad's oversight on mountain operations was inadequate. The report stated that the derailment was inevitable due to the number of unfortunate circumstances that happened during the trip. The engineers weren't found to be at fault at all, as they acted within reason.

=== Part 2: Undetected pipeline damage ===
The initial inspections of specific portions of the pipeline found no damage from the wreck, and so they deemed it safe to recharge the pipeline with product at full pressure. In particular, as this pipeline supplied Las Vegas, Calnev was under pressure to quickly resume the flow of product, and a San Bernardino resident later remarked that serving Las Vegas was worth more than everything in their California town. The pipeline operators monitored the initial flow in the pipeline, and as there was no leakage, everything was assumed to be fine.

After Calnev's initial inspection and product refill, cleanup of the train wreckage began. The hoppers were removed first, a process which took two days. On May 15, the locomotives were removed and the houses that had been damaged were also demolished, and 680 feet (210 m) of track was rebuilt. An excavator was then brought in to remove trona spilled from the freight cars, starting on May 16, the same day that SP resumed service on the track through the crash site, and ending on May 19, six days before the rupture.

Despite stakes being placed along the pipeline's route to show where it was to the crews cleaning up the spilled trona, the cleanup nonetheless caused undetected damage to the pipeline. NTSB investigators found gashes that were determined to have been left by a backhoe cleaning up the spilled cargo. Over time, these gashes caused the integrity of the pipeline to weaken and eventually rupture. During cleanup, Calnev only inspected short segments of the pipeline – generally around places where train wreckage had landed on top of the pipe. Other short excavations discovered other debris, including bogies from the hoppers. They did not carry out an excavation of the pipeline through the entire length of the derailment site for a further inspection, or, a hydrostatic test, either of which, if done, would have found the damage and prevented the rupture.

Immediately after the rupture, the pipeline control operators detected a sudden change in pumping pressure (indicating possible rupture or severe leakage) in the area, but failed to take immediate action to stop the flow of product. Additionally, the stop-and-check valves downstream from the rupture failed to close, allowing product to flow back down the pipe through Cajon Pass, which strengthened the intensity and duration of the fire. The valves were already defective at the time of the derailment, and this was not rectified in the two weeks between the derailment and the rupture.

During inspection of the pipeline after the rupture, more debris from one of the wrecked locomotives was discovered near the point of rupture. At the point of the rupture, the pipeline was only buried 2 1/2 feet (0.76 m) underneath the ground, much closer to the surface than the pipeline had been at the time of the derailment.

== In popular culture ==
The disaster was featured in "Runaway Train", a Season 3 (2005) Crash Scene Investigation episode of the Canadian TV series Mayday, also known in the U.S. as Air Disasters. For broadcasters that do not use the series name Mayday, this is one of three Season 3 episodes labeled as Crash Scene Investigation spin-offs, examining marine or rail disasters. The dramatization was broadcast with the title "Unstoppable Train" in the United States.
