= EMD SD40T-2 =

American diesel-electric locomotive

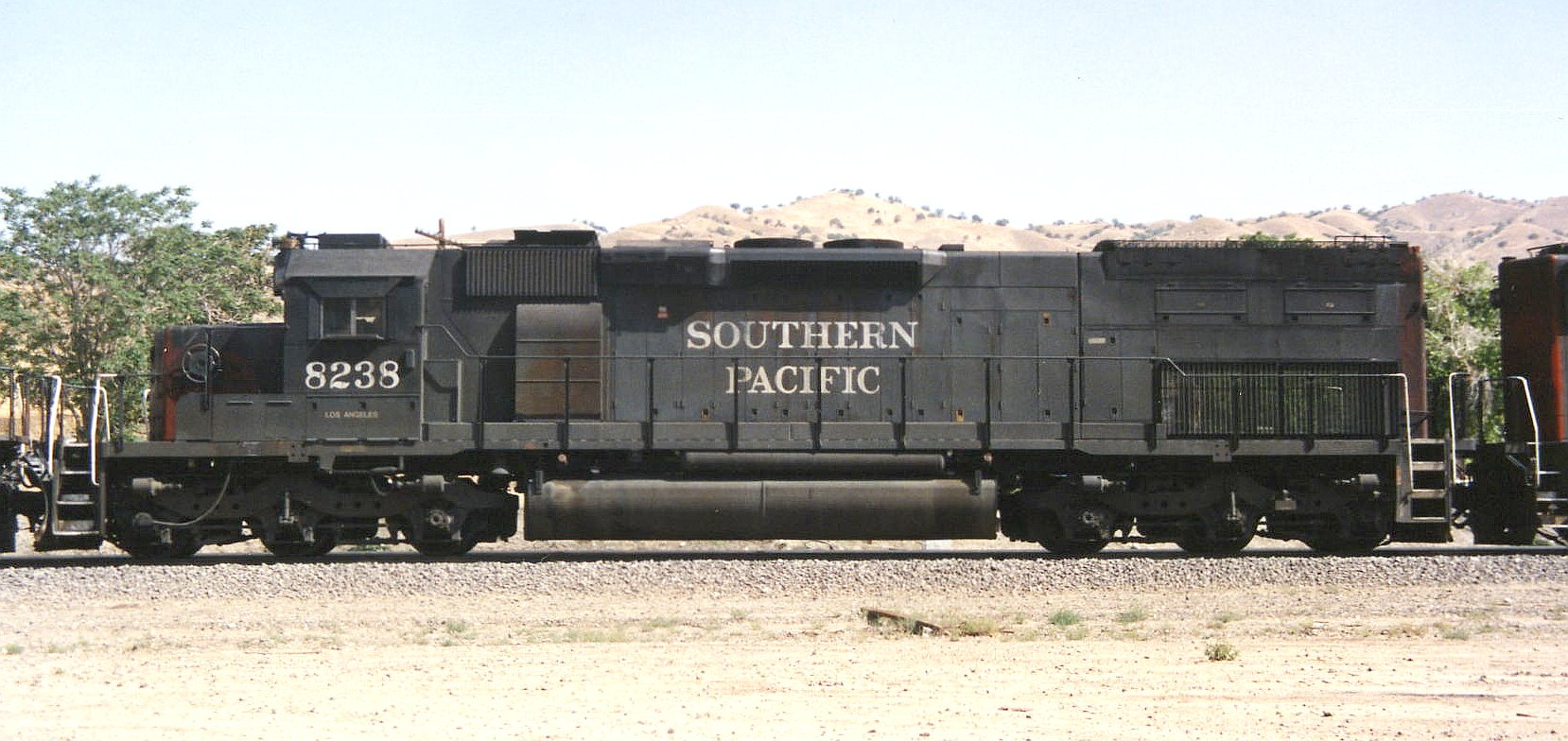
- SP 8238 eastbound at Caliente, California, in the late 1980s
Type and origin
- Power type: Diesel-electric
- Builder: General Motors Electro-Motive Division
- Model: SD40T-2
- Build date: June 1974 – July 1980
- Total produced: 312
Specifications
- Configuration
  - AAR: C-C
- Gauge: 4 ft 8 1/2 in (1,435 mm) standard gauge
- Trucks: HTC 6-Wheel
- Wheel diameter: 40 in (1,000 mm)
- Minimum curve: 30°
- Wheelbase: 13 ft 7 in (4,140 mm) between axles in each truck
- Pivot centres: 57 ft 3 in (17.45 m)
- Length: 70 ft 8 in (21,540 mm)
- Width: 10 ft 3 in (3,120 mm)
- Height: 15 ft 7.5 in (4,762 mm)
- Loco weight: 368,000 lb (167,000 kg) or 184 short tons (164 long tons; 167 t)
- Fuel capacity: 4,400 US gal (17,000 L; 3,700 imp gal)
- Lubricant cap.: 395 US gal (1,500 L; 329 imp gal)
- Coolant cap.: 275 US gal (1,040 L; 229 imp gal)
- Sandbox cap.: 56 ft^{3} (1,600 L)
- Prime mover: EMD 16-645E3
- Engine type: V16 diesel
- Alternator: GMD14
- Generator: Main: AR10; Auxiliary: Delco A8102
- Traction motors: 6
- Cylinders: 16
- Cylinder size: 9.02 in (229 mm) x 10 in (250 mm)
- MU working: Yes
- Train brakes: Westinghouse 26L (Air Brake)
Performance figures
- Maximum speed: 65 mph (105 km/h)
- Power output: 3,000 hp (2,200 kW)
- Tractive effort
  - Starting: 92,000 lbf (42,000 kgf; 410 kN) @ 25%
  - Continuous: 82,100 lbf (37,200 kgf; 365 kN) @ 11 mph (18 km/h)
Career
- Operators: Southern Pacific (and Cotton Belt), Rio Grande, Union Pacific
- Nicknames: "tunnel motors"
- Locale: United States
- Disposition: most still in service as of 2010

The SD40T-2 is a model of diesel-electric locomotive built by General Motors Electro-Motive Division in the United States. The SD40T-2 is equipped with a 16-cylinder EMD 645E3 diesel engine producing 3,000 horsepower (2,240 kW). 312 SD40T-2s were built for three railroads in the United States between April 1974 and July 1980. This locomotive and the SD45T-2 are popularly called tunnel motors, but EMD's term is SD40-2 with "cooling system modifications" because they were designed for better engine cooling in mountainous areas. The difference between this locomotive and its non-tunnel motor cousin, the SD40-2, are the radiator air intakes are located lower down at the rear of the locomotive.

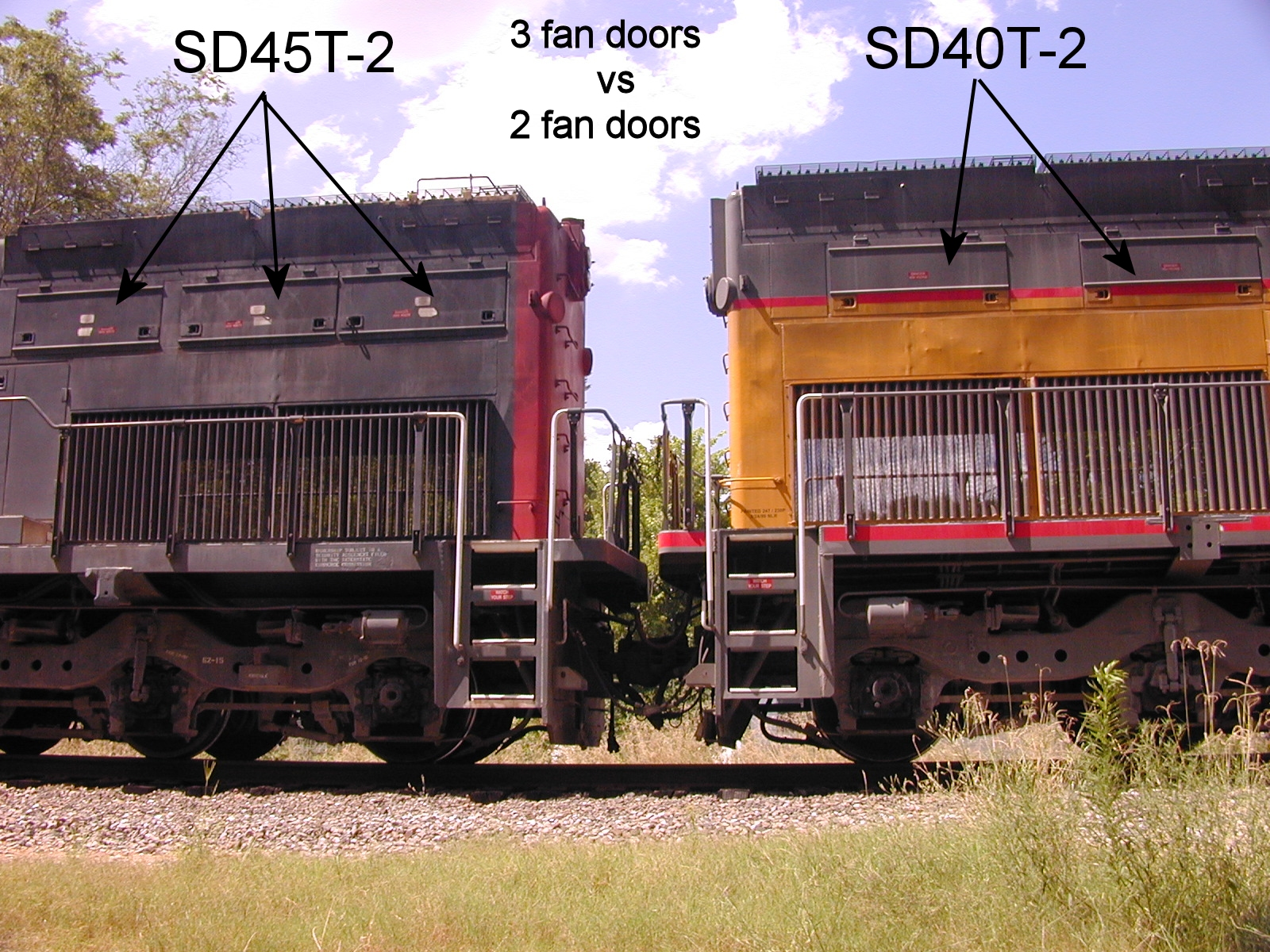
EMD SD45T-2 vs SD40T-2 radiator fan motor access doors

This locomotive model was purchased by the Denver and Rio Grande Western Railroad, the Southern Pacific Railroad, and its subsidiary Cotton Belt. Southern Pacific's version has a 4,400-US-gallon (16,700 L; 3,660 imp gal) fuel tank and is 70 feet 8 inches (21.54 m) long. Rio Grande's version has a smaller 4,000-US-gallon (15,100 L; 3,330 imp gal) fuel tank.

== Original purchasers ==
| Railroad | Quantity | Road numbers | Notes |
|---|---|---|---|
| Denver and Rio Grande Western Railroad | 73 | 5341-5413 | All with 81 in. or 88 in. short noses. |
| St. Louis Southwestern Railway (Cotton Belt) | 10 | 8322-8326, 8372-8376 | "snoot noses" |
| Southern Pacific Railroad | 229 | 8230-8299, 8300-8321, 8327-8341 8350-8371, 8377-8391, 8489-8573 | 8300 series featured extended "snoot" noses for radio control equipment. 8278 was damaged beyond repair in the 1989 Cajon Pass runaway and sold for parts, then scrapped. |
| Totals | 312 | | |

== Preservation ==
- Denver and Rio Grande Western #5371 is preserved at the Utah State Railroad Museum in Ogden, Utah.
- Denver and Rio Grande Western #5392 will be preserved at the city of Helper, Utah, as of 8/17/2026, donated by Genesee & Wyoming's Missouri and Northern Arkansas Railroad.
- Denver and Rio Grande Western #5401 is preserved at the Colorado Railroad Museum in Golden, Colorado.
- From 2010 to 2019, Union Pacific #2921 (formerly Southern Pacific #8385) was preserved at the Boone and Scenic Valley Railroad in Boone, Iowa. In 2020, the locomotive was traded to Midwest Locomotive Leasing (MWLX) for general service.
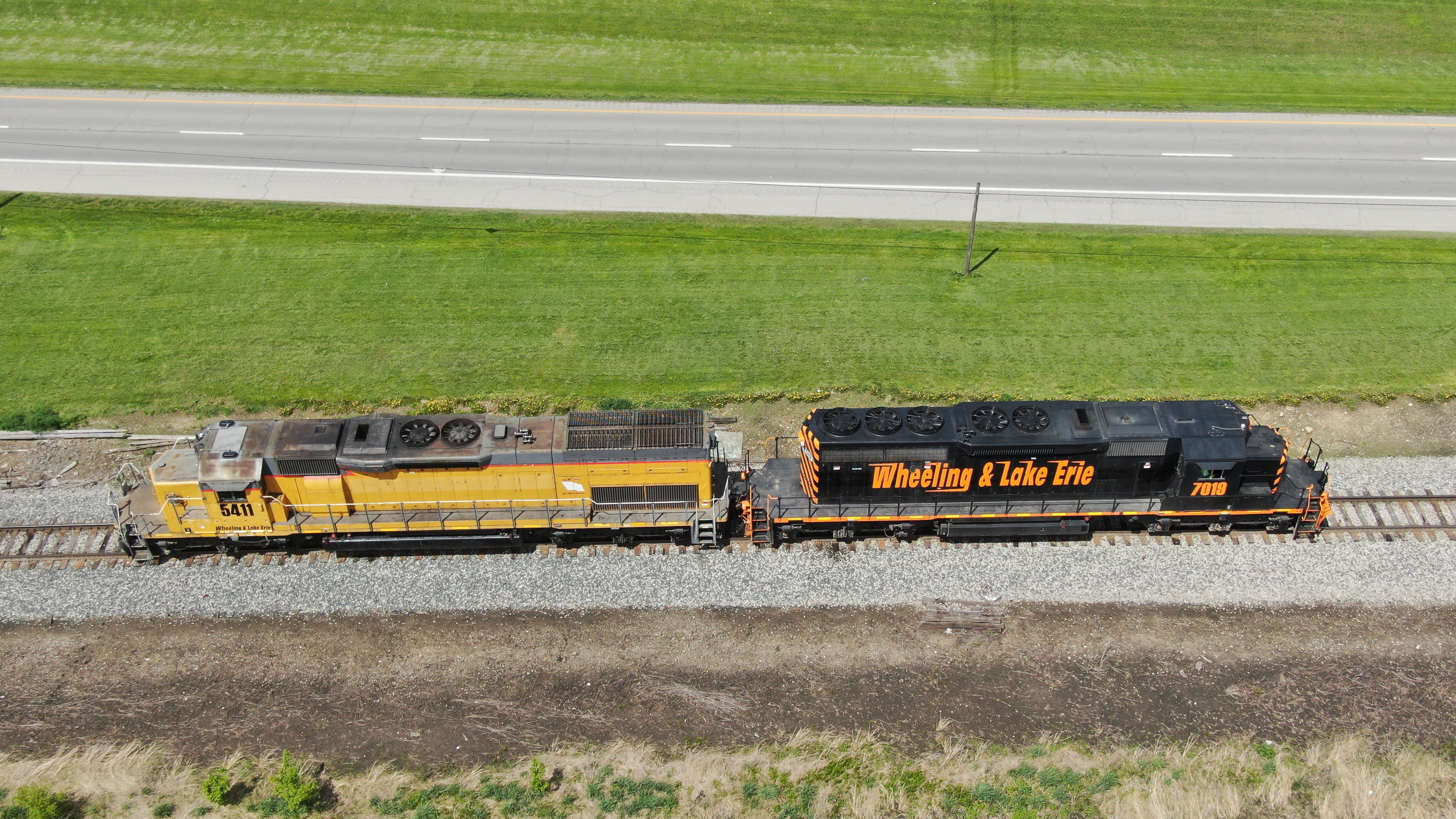
  Comparison between an EMD SD40T-2 (left) and SD40-2 (right)
- Southern Pacific #5387 (formerly Denver and Rio Grande Western #5387) is preserved at the Midwest Overland Rail Preservation Society in Kansas City, Missouri
