= Calnev Pipeline =

Oil pipeline from Los Angeles, California to Las Vegas, Nevada, United States

Location
- Country: United States
- Start: Los Angeles, California
- To: Nellis Air Force Base, Las Vegas, Nevada

General information
- Type: Oil products
- Owner: Kinder Morgan Energy Partners

Technical information
- Length: 550 mi (890 km)
- Maximum discharge: 0.128 million barrels per day (~6.38×10^{6} t/a)
- Diameter: 14 in (356 mm)

The Calnev Pipeline is a 550-mile (890 km) long buried refined oil products pipeline in the United States, owned by Kinder Morgan Energy Partners. The pipeline consists of two parallel lines, the larger, has a diameter of 14 inches (360 mm) and the smaller one has a diameter of 8 inches (200 mm). The lines carry gasoline, jet fuel, and diesel fuel from Los Angeles, California, refineries as far as Nellis Air Force Base south of North Las Vegas, Nevada. It carries approximately 128,000 barrels per day (20,400 m^{3}/d). Jet fuel from the pipeline is also delivered to the Harry Reid International Airport tank farm in Paradise. Additional terminal facilities are located in Barstow, California.

The line was the sole source for the products it delivers to Las Vegas until the Unev pipeline began operating in 2012. UNEV provides access to refined oil products from Utah.

== Accidents and incidents ==
On December 22, 1980, the pipeline carrying jet fuel ruptured in the Las Vegas Valley, near Tropicana Avenue, spilling fuel for 2 hours. Later, the fuel ignited, forcing road closures. One firefighter was overcome by fumes. Between 50,000 and 100,000 US gallons (190,000 and 380,000 L) of jet fuel were spilled. Prior construction in the area was suspected of damaging the pipeline.

On May 12, 1989, a Southern Pacific Railroad train derailed in San Bernardino, California, directly over the pipeline. Later that month, on May 25, the Calnev Pipeline ruptured in the same location, causing a fire that killed two people. The definitive cause of the pipeline rupture is not known as the pipeline was in the process of being dug up to be visually inspected after the train derailment. The National Transportation Safety Board theorizes that the pipeline was damaged from the cleanup of the train derailment that occurred thirteen days earlier.

== Impacts ==
=== Environmental ===
In 2010, Kinder Morgan proposed an expansion project which would add a third, 16-inch pipeline to accompany the two existing pipelines. Several organizations, as well as state government agencies, responded to the CalNev Expansion Project such as the Metropolitan Water District of Southern California and the Nevada Department of Wildlife. The project proposed building across Cajon Creek Conservation Area in San Bernardino which would affect over 20 sensitive species. Construction would alter the area's hydrological regime and pose a risk to the animals living in this area. Certain areas of the pipeline also require replacing depleted areas of cathodic protection, which protect the pipeline from rust and potential leaks. In 2015, the cathodic protection system of the pipeline that passes through the Mojave National Preserve needed to be repaired. This repair construction disrupts nearby habitats. However, to omit repair greatly increases the risk of an oil spill.

=== Route ===
The CalNev Pipeline begins in Los Angeles, California, runs through with terminal stops in San Bernardino County in the cities of Colton and Barstow and ends outside of Las Vegas, Nevada.

== Regulations ==
=== Current ===
All pipelines in the United States have to adhere to the regulations set forth by the U.S. Department of Transportation Pipeline and Hazardous Materials Safety Administration (PHMSA). PHMSA sets regulations pertaining to the operation, construction, expansion of pipelines, which private pipeline companies have to adhere to, with federal and state inspectors enforcement. Calnev is an interstate pipeline crossing California and Nevada therefore it is managed by PMHSA and inspected by federal agents. However, portions of pipeline exclusively within California or Nevada could be inspected by respective state agencies. In 2016, there were seven broad system-wide program inspections and two targeted investigations intended to scrutinize certain safety features in regards to the pipeline. According to PMHSA’s Pipeline Safety Stakeholder Communications data, Calnev has had one case in the last ten years in which PHMSA issued a Corrective Action Order in 2004 against Kinder Morgan in regards to a failure in Calnev Pipeline which released gasoline to its environment, an order that was marked closed in 2007. There was no proposed or collected penalty.

=== Future ===
Recently, then-President Donald Trump issued a key memorandum altering previous regulations regarding the construction of pipelines in the United States. Issued on January 24, 2017, this memorandum includes expediting the construction of future American pipelines, such as the Keystone XL Pipeline and the Dakota Access Pipeline, as well as high priority infrastructure projects. One of the key developments stated in this memorandum is that all future new and expanding pipelines to be constructed in the United States were to be built with materials “produced within the United States." In which case, the Calnev expansion project would need to add a new section in their proposal explaining what materials would be used for construction for the current proposal does not address this. Other important new regulations include those mentioned in the order to expedite environmental reviews and approvals on high priority infrastructure projects, which were defined by then-President Trump to include “critical...pipelines”. With this memorandum, the chairman of the White House Council on Environmental Quality (CEQ) has the power to decide whether a project is “high priority” or not within 30 days of receiving project requests in efforts to streamline the approval process.

== Expansion plans ==
On July 23, 2007, Kinder Morgan Energy Partners announced that it will expand the pipeline by constructing an additional 16-inch (410 mm) pipeline alongside the existing pipelines. It will increase the total pipeline system capacity to 200,000 barrels per day (32,000 m^{3}/d), and with additional pumping stations to more than 300,000 barrels per day (48,000 m^{3}/d).

== See also ==
- List of natural gas pipelines in North America
- List of oil pipelines in North America
- List of oil refineries in North America
- Pipeline transport
