= Unev pipeline =

Coordinates: 36.2184°N 115.3112°W

Unev Pipeline

Location
- Country: United States
- Start: Woods Cross, Utah
- To: Las Vegas Valley

General information
- Type: Oil products
- Partners: Holly Corporation; Sinclair Oil
- Operator: UNEV Pipeline, LLC
- Commissioned: 2011 (operational in 2012)

Technical information
- Length: 425 mi (684 km)
- Maximum discharge: 0.06 million barrels per day (~3.0×10^{6} t/a)
- Diameter: 12 in (305 mm)

The UNEV pipeline is a 399-mile (642 km) long 12-inch diameter pipeline from Woods Cross, Utah, United States, to the Las Vegas Valley at the Apex Industrial Park. This 53-acre (21 ha) facility has the capacity to store 330,000 barrels (52,000 m^{3}) of product. Expansion of the North Las Vegas Terminal was completed in 2014. An additional terminal facility, the 30-acre (12 ha) Cedar City Terminal, is located in Cedar City, Utah, with the capacity to store 200,000 barrels (32,000 m^{3}) of product.

This pipeline is the second oil pipeline for Las Vegas, adding capacity and providing a second source to the Calnev Pipeline. Completion was planned for operation in the spring of 2011. Commencement of operations was delayed to 2012 and is now operational.

== History ==
The $300,000,000 pipeline has an initial capacity of 62,000 barrels per day (9,900 m^{3}/d) with a maximum capacity of 118,000 barrels per day (18,800 m^{3}/d).

In 2025, owner HF Sinclair announced that it was evaluating an expansion of the pipeline. As of 2026, the pipeline supplied roughly 15% of the total fuel needs of Nevada.

== UNEV Pipeline, LLC. ==
The pipe is owned and operated by UNEV Pipeline LLC a wholly owned subsidiary of HF Sinclair.
