= Haysi Railroad =

The Haysi Railroad Company (reporting mark HRR) was a terminal/switching railroad that owned and operated seven miles of track from Haysi, Virginia, to Vicey, Virginia. The railroad was known most for its unusual motive power.

== History ==
The Haysi Railroad was founded in February 1970, after the Clinchfield railroad completed its Greenbrier Branch from Haysi-Vicey Virginia. HRR was controlled by the Seaboard Coast Line Railroad and Louisville and Nashville Railroad (later Family Lines System holding company in November 1972). It served coal mines in and around Haysi, Virginia.

On June 1, 1983, the Seaboard System merged the Haysi Railroad, ending its existence as an independent entity. In 2007 the last of the coal operations on the line shut down, and since then the line has been unmaintained by CSX, virtually abandoned.

== Motive power ==
The Haysi Railroad probably was best known for its unorthodox motive power, which included an EMD F7B that was built in February 1949 as Clinchfield Railroad F3B #852, and later upgraded to an F7B in January 1952. The Haysi Railroad had acquired the B-unit on April 6, 1970, renumbered it to #1, and equipped it with radio controls and a makeshift cab and bell in 1972. The B-unit was HRR's sole locomotive until February 1977, when it leased four EMD SD18's and four SD9’s from the Duluth, Missabe and Iron Range. The SD9’s were leased by the Louisville and Nashville, but were sent to HRR. The locomotives were returned to DM&IR in 1989. #1 is now preserved as VLIX #852 at the Tennessee Valley Railroad Museum in Chattanooga, Tennessee, albeit in rough shape.
