= B-unit =

Type of cabless locomotive unit

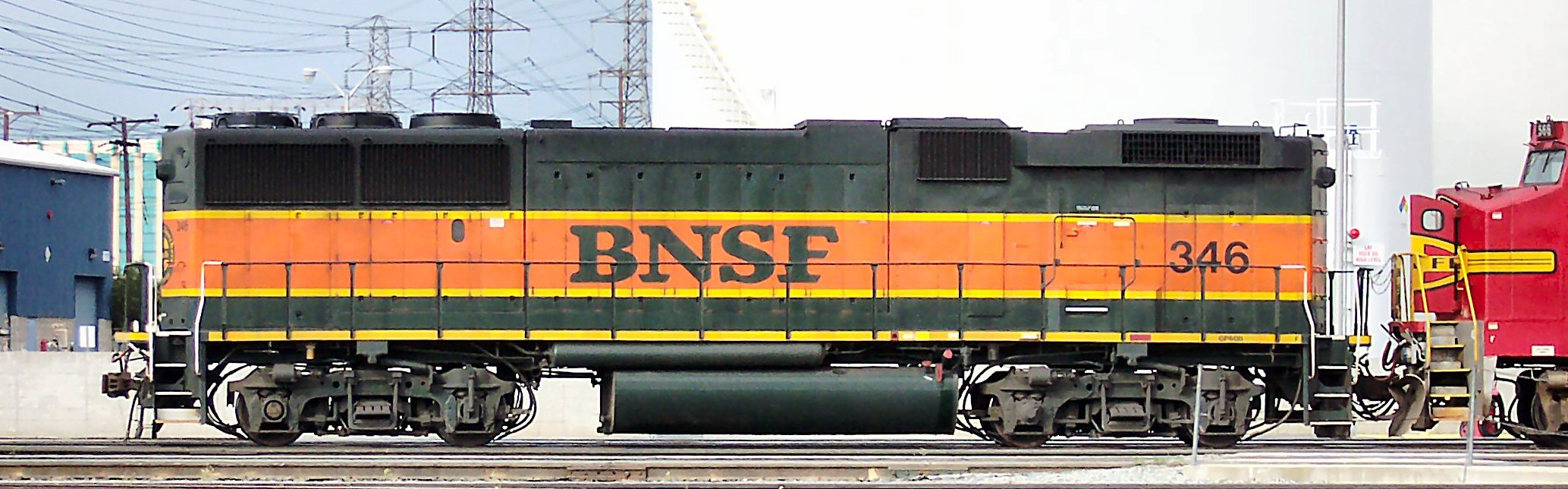
BNSF GP60B #346, a rare example of a B-unit of a hood-styled locomotive still in service as of 2016

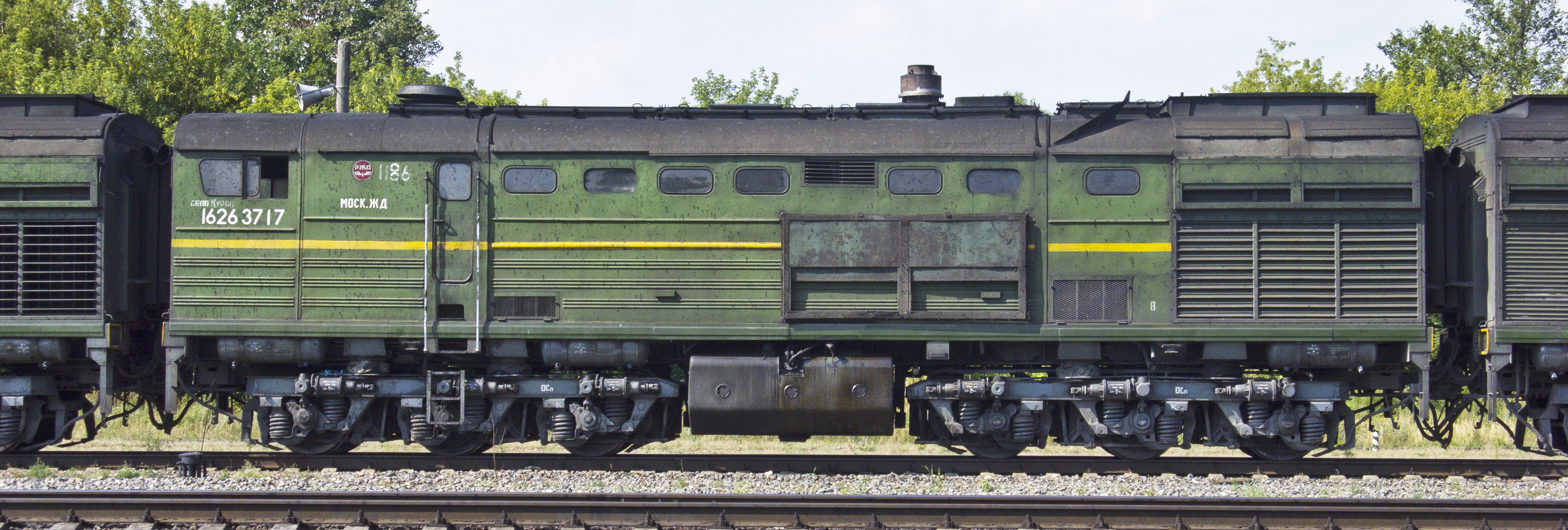
B-unit of the Russian 3TE10MK diesel locomotive with a cab-styled body

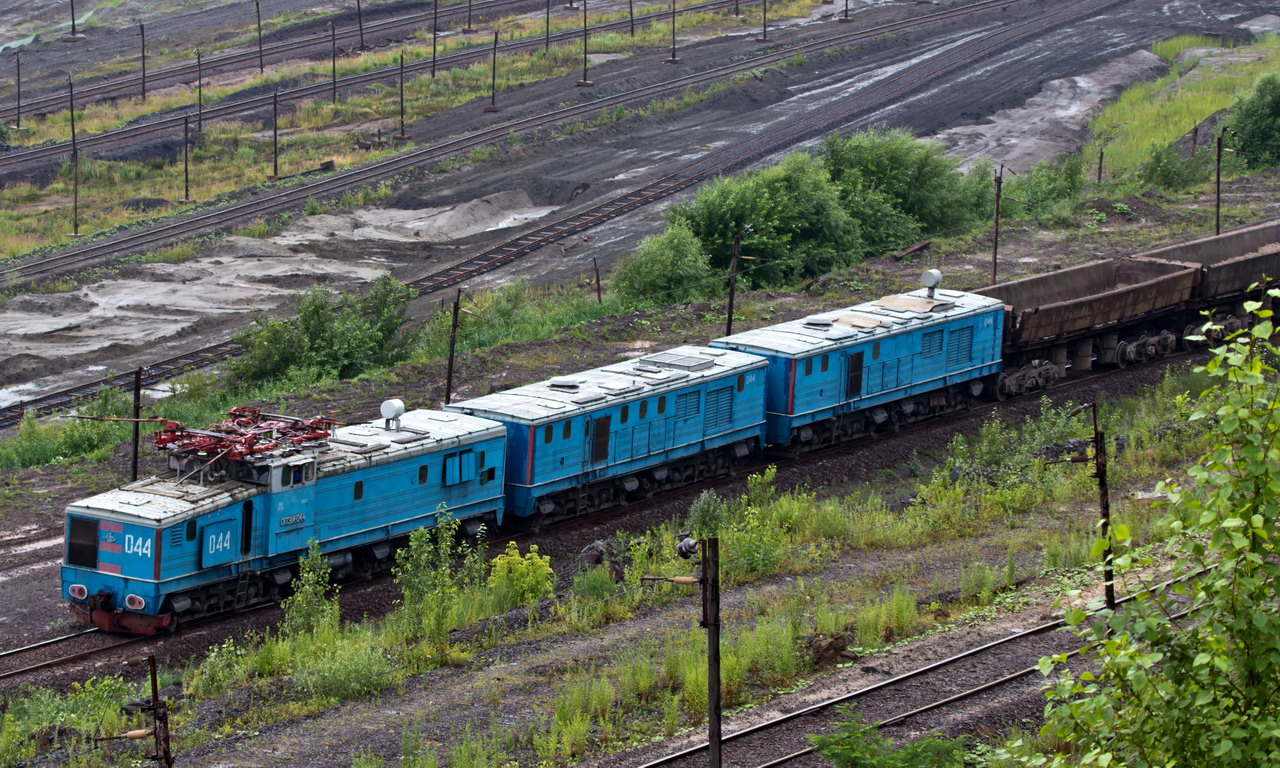
Russian OPE1A industrial electro-diesel locomotive for quarry railways with primary electric locomotive and two diesel-electric B units

A B-unit, in railroad terminology, is a locomotive unit (generally a diesel locomotive) which does not have a control cab or crew compartment and therefore must be operated in tandem with another coupled locomotive with a cab (an A-unit). The terms booster unit and cabless are also used. The concept is largely confined to North America and post-Soviet countries. Elsewhere, locomotives without driving cabs are rare.

A B-unit is distinct from a slug unit, which only has traction motors and in certain instances may have a cab.

The term primarily is applied to freight locomotives, but can be applied to passenger multiple units as well in some cases for when motor cars are put in the middle of trains. In practice however, the term is rarely used to describe multiple unit trains, and in many circumstances the non-cab cars are directly or indirectly permanently attached to a cab car.

== Controls ==
Some B-units cannot be moved without a controlling unit attached, but most have some simple controls inside, and often a side window at that control station. For example, B-unit versions of the EMD FT with conventional couplers had a fifth porthole-style window added on the right side only for the control station. Other models used existing windows. These controls enable a hostler to move the B-unit locomotive by itself in a yard or shops. B-units without controls are generally semi-permanently coupled to controlling units. Sometimes, there is a terminology distinction between the types: a "booster" is a B-unit with hostler controls, and a "slave" is a B-unit without hostler controls.

== Reasons for use ==
The reasons railroads ordered B-units included the fact that a B-unit was slightly cheaper. With no driving cab, B-units lack windshields, crew seats, radios, heating, and air conditioning. There would also be no toilets, which were usually found in the short hood of an A-unit. Additionally, at first, railroads bought multiple-unit diesel locomotives as one-for-one replacements for steam locomotives; as a result, railroads could not take advantage of the flexibility afforded by interchangeable units, which could be assembled into any required power output. When a three- or four-unit locomotive was considered an indivisible unit, there was no point in the intermediate units having cabs. A further advantage was that as B-units had no controls, unions were unable to insist that each unit be staffed. Finally, B-units gave a smoother, streamlined appearance to the train for passenger service.

== The B-unit era ==
B-units were commonly built in the cab unit days in the 1930s, 1940s, 1950s, and 1960s. When hood unit road switchers became the common kind of diesel locomotive, some B-units were built, but many railroads soon came to the opinion that the lower cost of a B-unit did not offset the lack of operational flexibility. Few B-units have been built in the last 40 years. Railroads that kept ordering B-units longer than most were largely Western roads, including the Southern Pacific, Union Pacific, Burlington Northern and the Santa Fe. Santa Fe ordered the GP60B model in 1991, which were the final B-units built for road service in North America as of 2005.

== Conversions ==
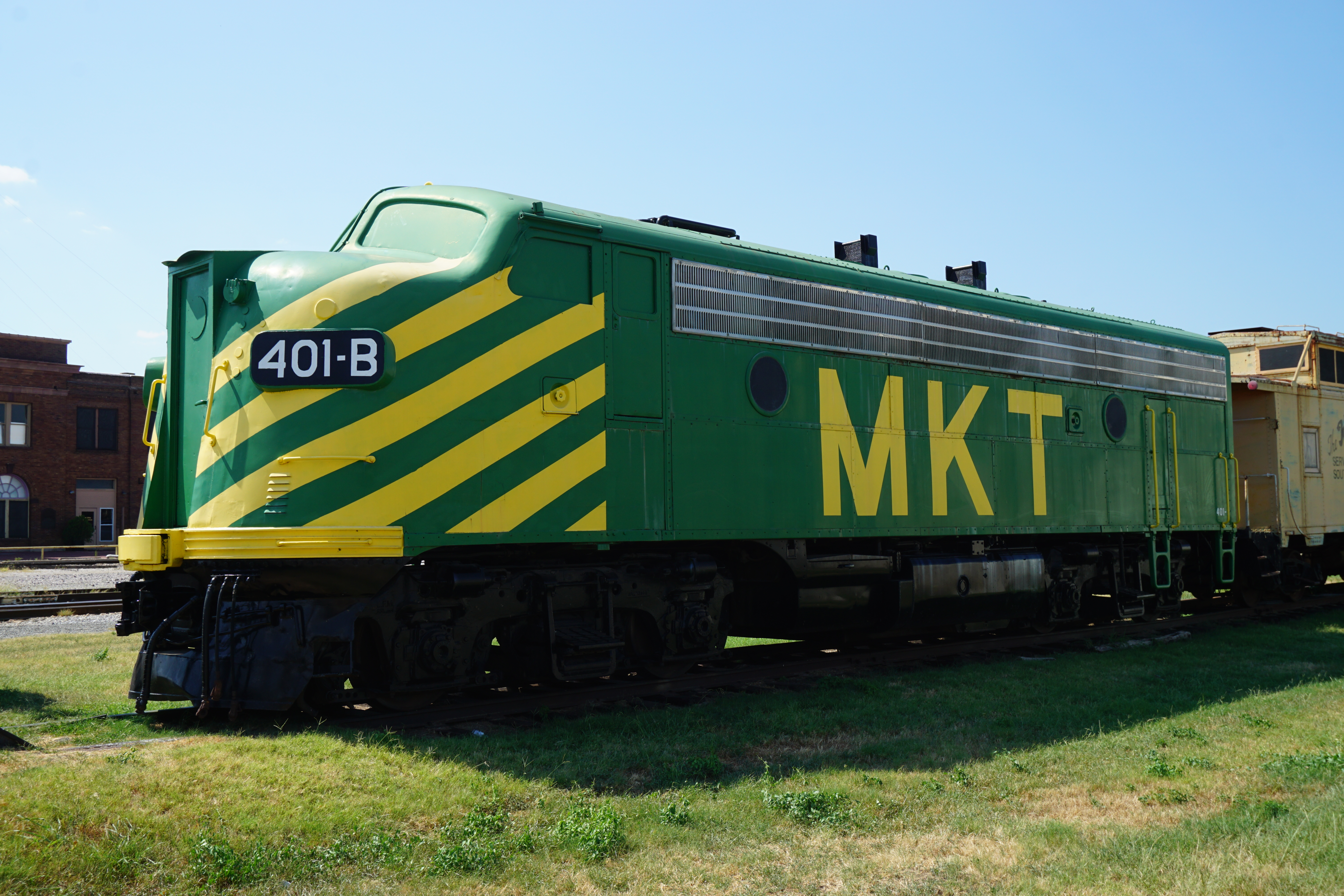
B-unit converted from an EMD F9AM locomotive. The cabin shape was preserved, but its windows were blanked out and the front door was added.

In some cases, a B-unit is converted from an already existing A-unit. The cab is either removed or has its windows blanked out (such as on CSX GE BQ23-7 units), and all non-essential equipment is removed. The degree to which this equipment is removed depends on the railroad, but may (and usually does) include the removal of the speedometer, event recorder, horn, headlights, toilet, and cab heaters. This conversion was sometimes performed when the A-unit had been in a collision and rebuilding the cab was not cost-effective.

In some rare instances, B-units were converted to incorporate a cab, such as on the Chicago & North Western Railway in the 1970s with some EMD E8 B-units bought from the Union Pacific. The homebuilt cabs were referred to as "Crandall Cabs". Also, the Santa Fe rebuilt four of its five GP7Bs to GP9us with cabs. In the Illinois Central Gulf's GP11 rebuild program, some of the engines used were ex-UP GP9Bs, and in their SD20 program, some ex-UP SD24Bs were also used. BNSF converted a former ATSF GP60B #370 into a cab unit and was renumbered to #170 in 2010. This unit was later renumbered as BNSF 200 in 2014.

== Unusual consists ==
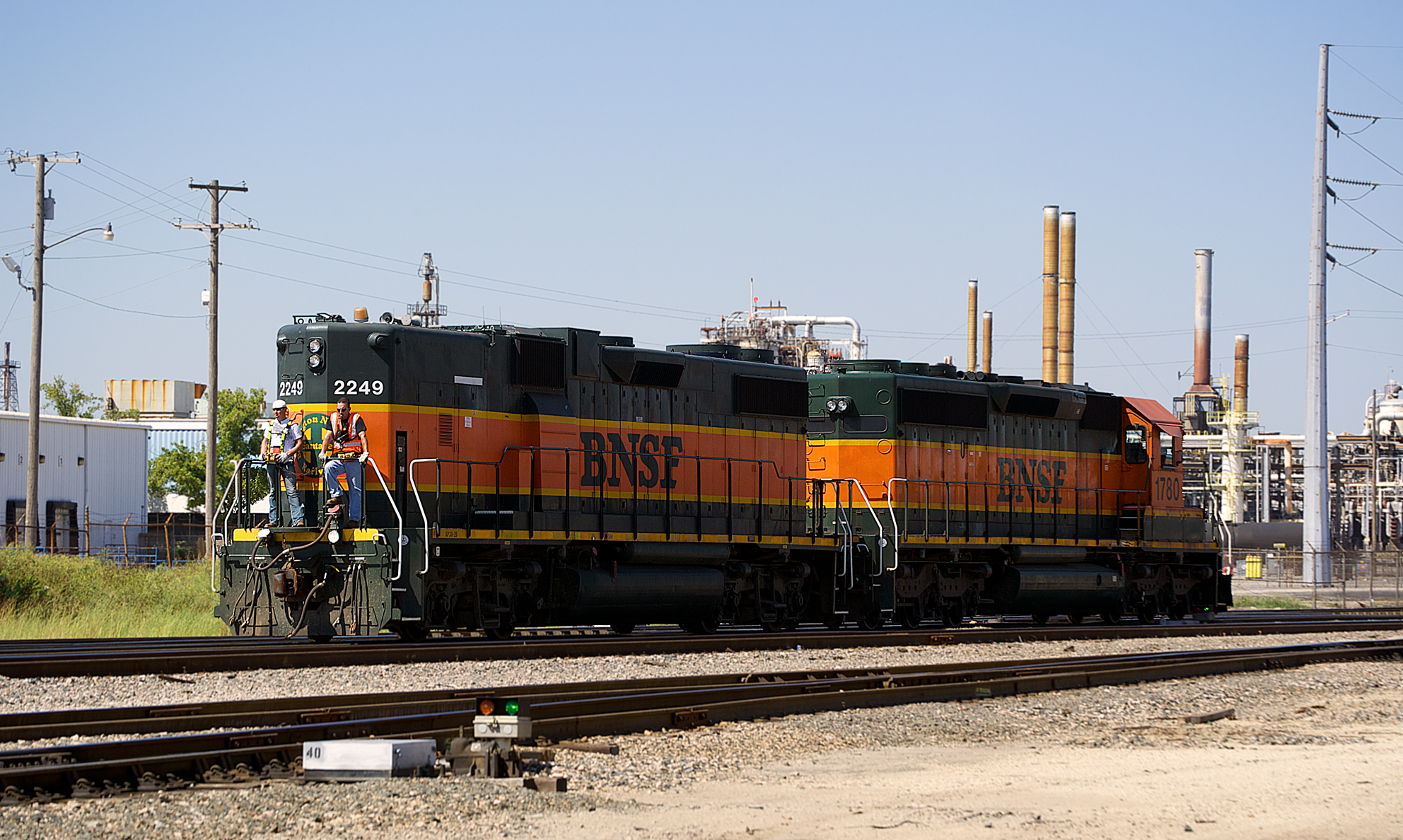
A four-axle EMD GP38-2 B-unit coupled with a six-axle SD40-2 A-unit

In rare instances, a B-unit will run at the front of a train. That is usually avoided because it limits visibility from the locomotive cab, but locomotive orientation and operational requirements may dictate that the B-unit runs first. A prominent example is the Haysi Railroad, which owned an F7B that was given radio controls and a makeshift cab.

== List of B-unit locomotive models ==
These are all known B-unit models, with discrepancies settled by the later (Marre) reference. At least one of each model was manufactured. All units below contain one or more engines and traction motors, so slugs and snails are not listed.

=== United States ===
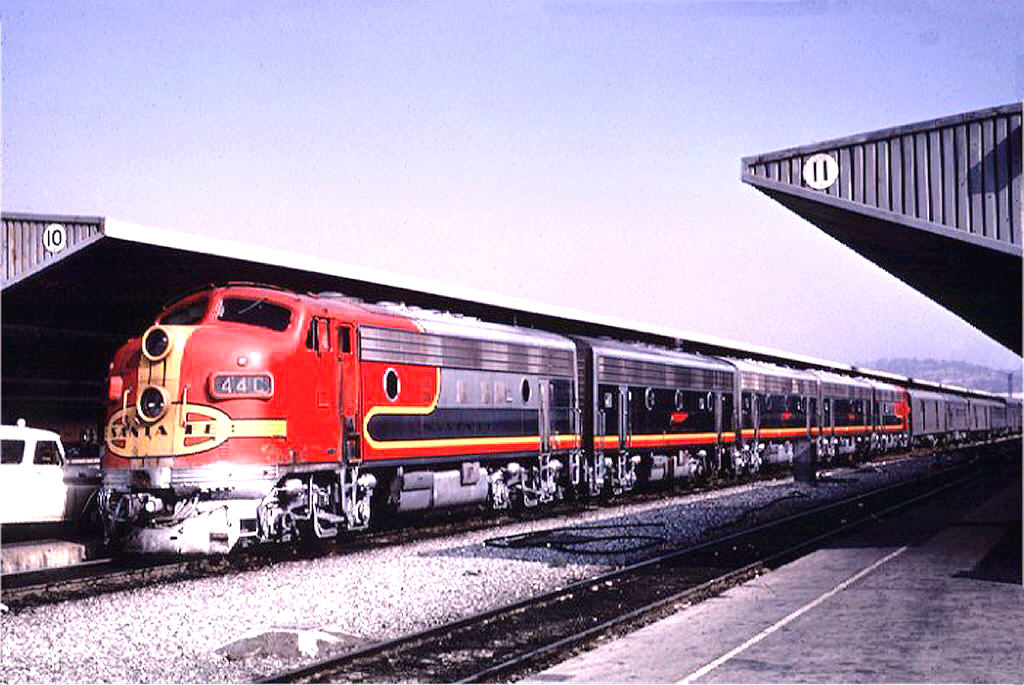
EMD F7 five-unit diesel locomotive in A-B-B-B-A formation (two A- and three B-units) with a passenger train

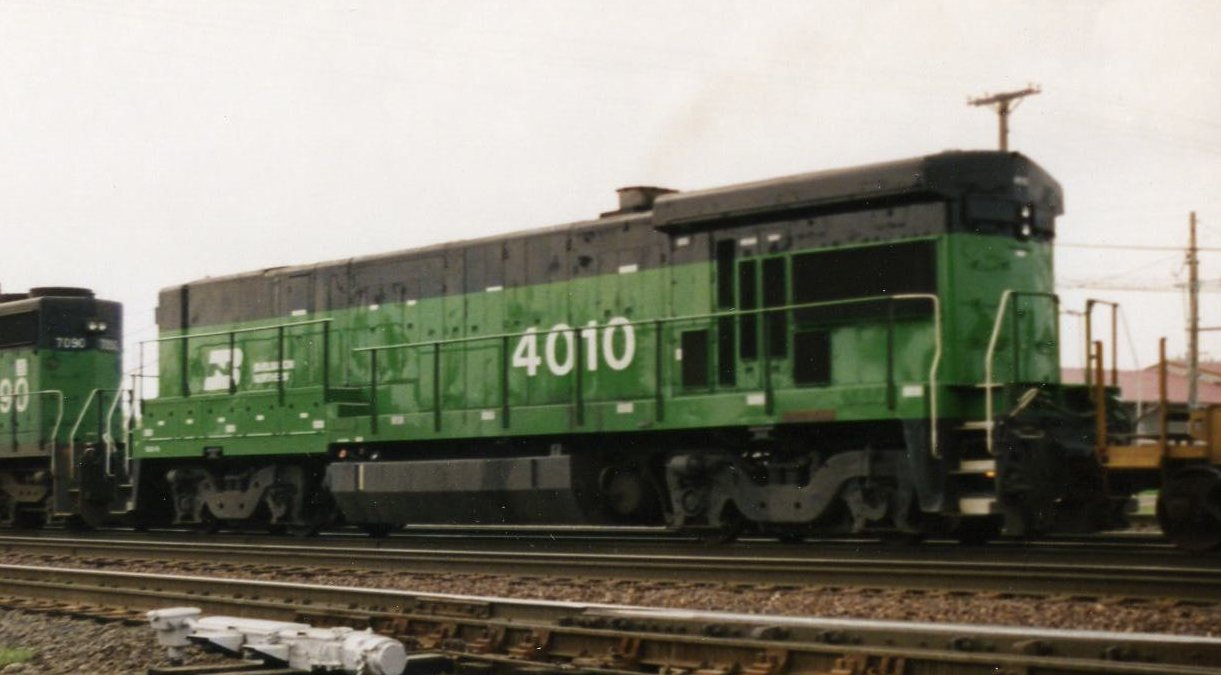
Burlington Northern 4010, a B30-7A hood B-unit, working in Aurora, Illinois, in 1993

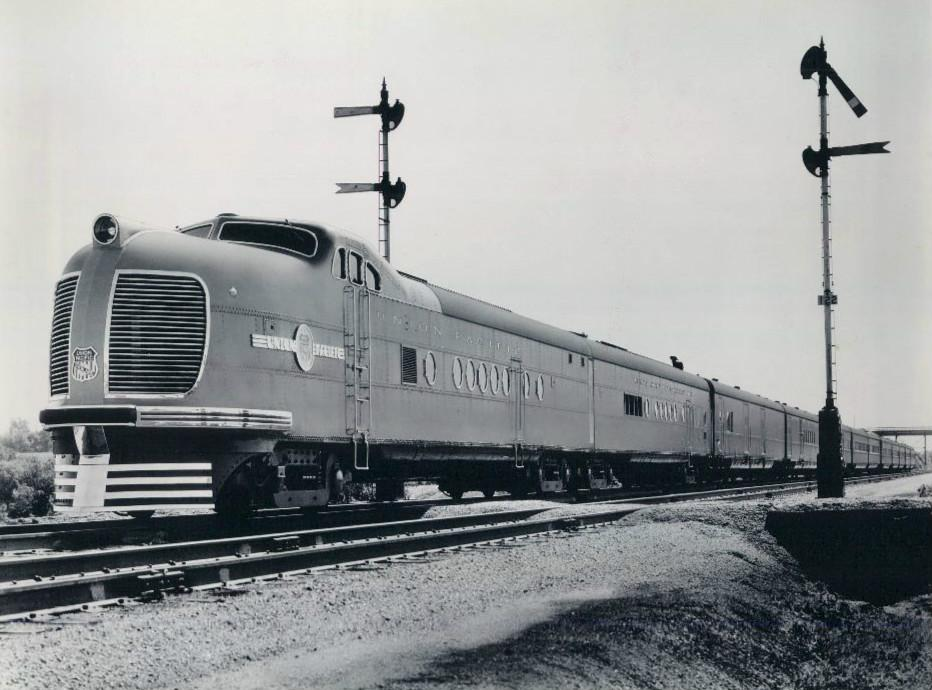
A Union Pacific City of Denver (M-10005 or M-10006), 1940

In the US, B-units of mainline diesel locomotives typically had their own model designations and received individual numbers as independent locomotive units, separate from any A-units. The first B-units often used the next or previous model number corresponding to that of an A-unit (for example, ALCO DL-202 and DL-203 for the A- and B-units, respectively). Later, the model name was usually indicated by the letter "B" at the end or in the middle of the model designation. The only exception is the DD35, which was initially created as a B-unit before a similar A-unit with a cabin, called the DD35A, was introduced. At the same time, shunting cow–calf diesel locomotives with semi-permanently coupled A- and B-unit were considered a single locomotive, so a common designation for both units were used.

The New York City Subway Revenue cars 66 and 67 were R8A units which were B-units also.

Diesel locomotives:

- Factory-built:
  - ALCO/MLW — Black Maria Booster, DL-108, DL-110, FB-1, FB-2, FPB-2, FPB-4, PB-1, PB-2, C855B, M420B
  - Baldwin — AS-616B, DRS-6-6-1500B, DR-4-4-15B, RF-16B, DR-6-4-15B, DR-6-4-20B
  - EMD E units — EB, E1B, E2B, E3B, E4B, E5B, E6B, E7B, E8B, E9B
  - EMD F-units — FTB, F2B, F3B, F7B, F9B
  - EMD Hood units – DD35, GP7B, GP9B, GP30B, GP60B, SD24B
  - Fairbanks-Morse — B Erie, CFB-16-4, CFB-20-4, CPB-16-4, CPB-16-5
  - GE Transportation — UM20B booster, B30-7A
- Rebuilds:
  - EMD Cab units — F9AM B (by MKT)
  - EMD Hood units — GP38-2B (by BN), SD40B (by BN), SD40-2B (by BN), SD45B (by ATSF), SD45-2B (by ATSF)
  - GE Transportation — U30CB (by BN; MP also operated a cabless U30C but did not give it this designation), B36-7 (B) (by SSW)
- Power cars for diesel trainsets
  - Budd Company — power cars 9906B and 9907B of Denver Zephyr trainsets (A-B formation)
  - Pullman-Standard — power cars for M-10002 and M-10003 to M-10006 trainset (A-B or A-B-B formation)

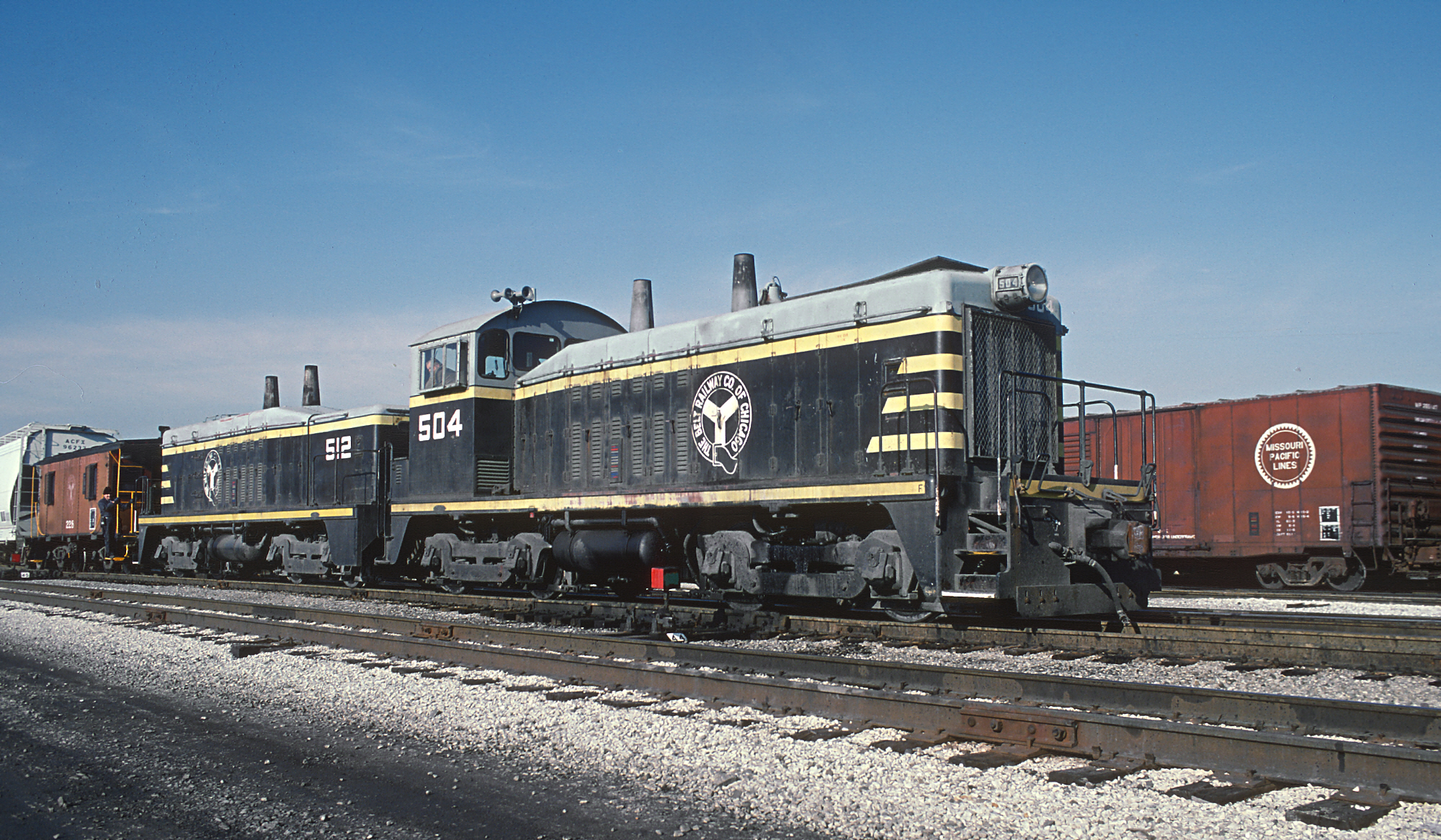
EMD SW7 (TR4) cow–calf locomotive

- Cow–calf diesel shunters:
  - EMD — TR, TR1, TR2, TR3, TR4, TR5, TR6, TR9, TR12
  - ALCO — SSB-9
  - Baldwin — S-8

Gas turbine locomotives:

- Factory-built:
  - ALCO/GE Transportation - Union Pacific gas turbine locomotives of the third generation with a diesel A and gas turbine B-unit
- Rebuilds:
  - experimental coal gas turbine B–unit from W-1 electric locomotive for joint operation with ALCO PA-1 diesel locomotive

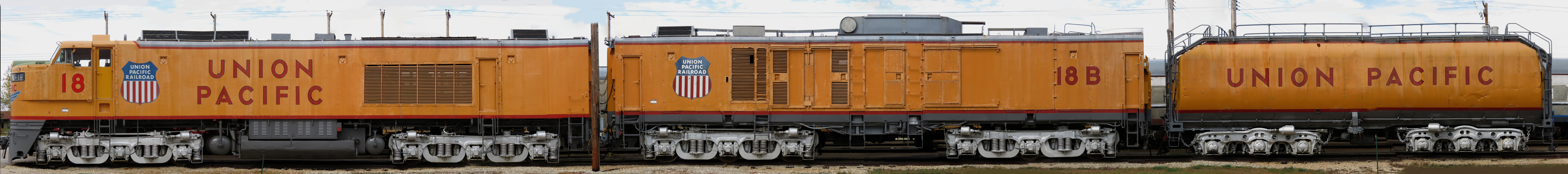
Union Pacific gas turbine locomotive with diesel A-unit (left), gas turbine B-unit (center) and tender (right)

=== USSR, Russia, Ukraine and other post-Soviet countries ===
In the USSR and later Russia, Ukraine, Kazakhstan and other post-Soviet countries, unlike the US, B-units don't have their own numbers and model designations, because they operate in a semi-fixed formations with two A-units and so considered as parts of a single multi-unit locomotive with A-B-A or A-B-B-A configuration respectively. Most of these locomotives work on BAM rail line, located on Russian Far East. Many other Russian locomotives function as semi-permanently coupled three or four unit sets.

A prefix number with the total number of units is indicated in the model name before the main designation: «2» was used for two-unit A-A locomotives, «3» — for three-unit A-B-A locomotives and «4» — for four-unit A-B-B-A locomotives. Each unit has an additional letter after a number: letters «А» and «Б» («A» and «B») are given to two A-units, and letters «В» and «Г» («V» and «G», third and fourth letters in Russian alphabet) are given to B-units in the middle. The only exception are electric locomotives 2ES10, B-units of which received separate numbering and the «2ЭС10С» (2ES10S) type designation. In the factory documentation, the three-unit version of these locomotives often called as 3ES10, however, this designation is not used in practice.

At the same time, the designation system of industrial quarry electric and electro-diesel locomotives is different. The number initially indicated the number of motorized dump cars or slugs, and the letter A or T indicated the presence of a diesel generator B-unit, but subsequently the numbers and letters lost their original meaning.

Diesel locomotives:

- Luhanskteplovoz (Ukraine) — 3TE3, 3TE10 (3TE10V, 3TE10M, 3TE10U, UzTE16M3 and 4TE10S), 3M62U, 4TE130, 3TE116U
- Bryansk Machine-Building Plant (Russia) — 3TE25K^{2M}, 3TE25K^{3M}, 3TE28.

B–units of these locomotives have reduced set of driving controls, intended for service movement of the locomotive.

Russian and Ukrainian multi-unit diesel locomotives

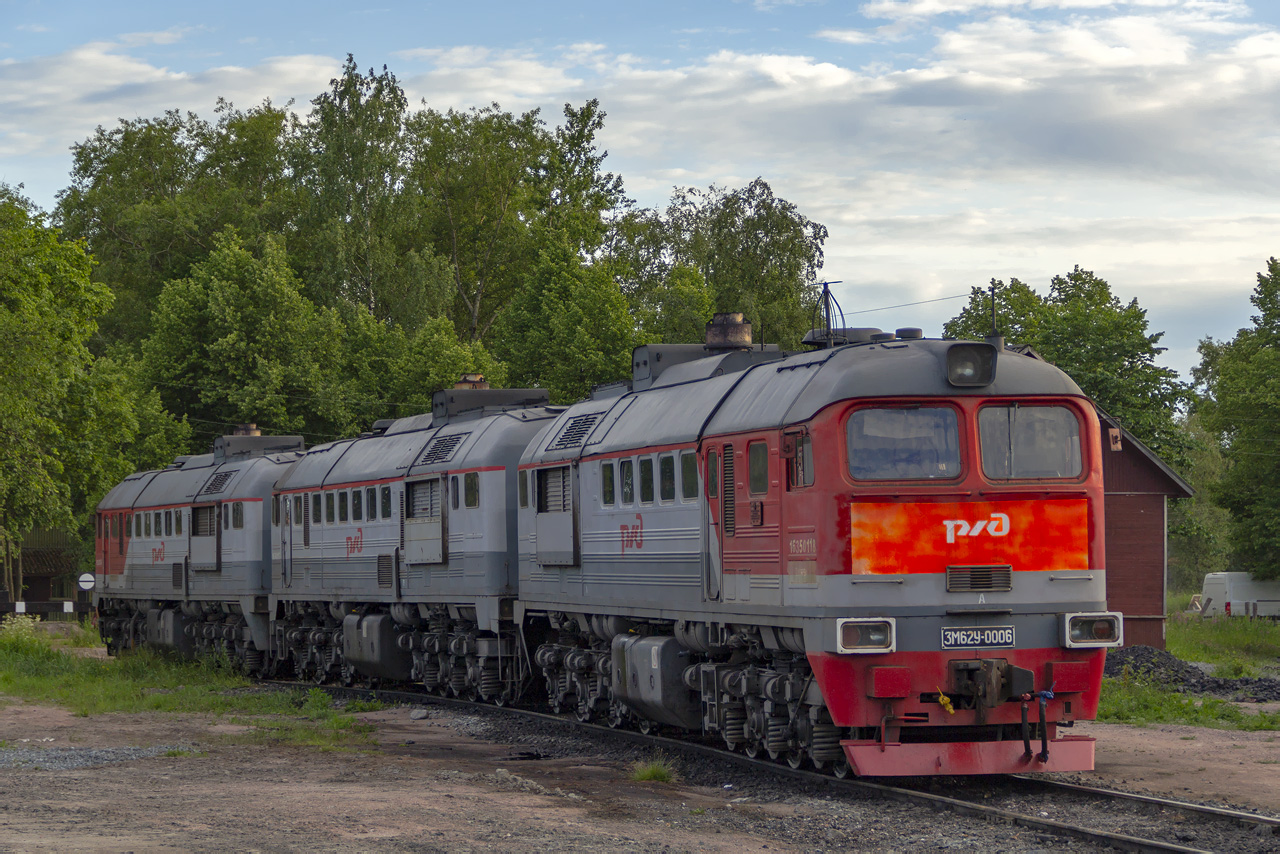
3M62U

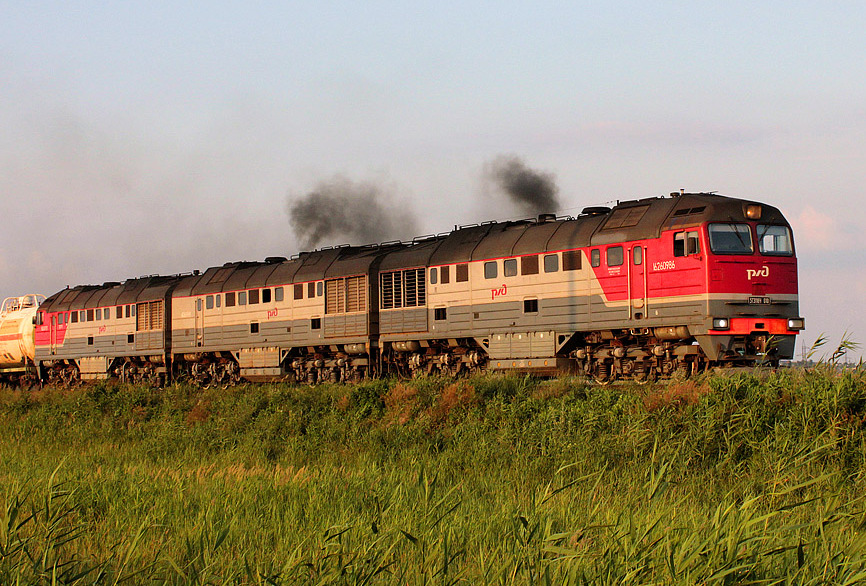
3TE116U

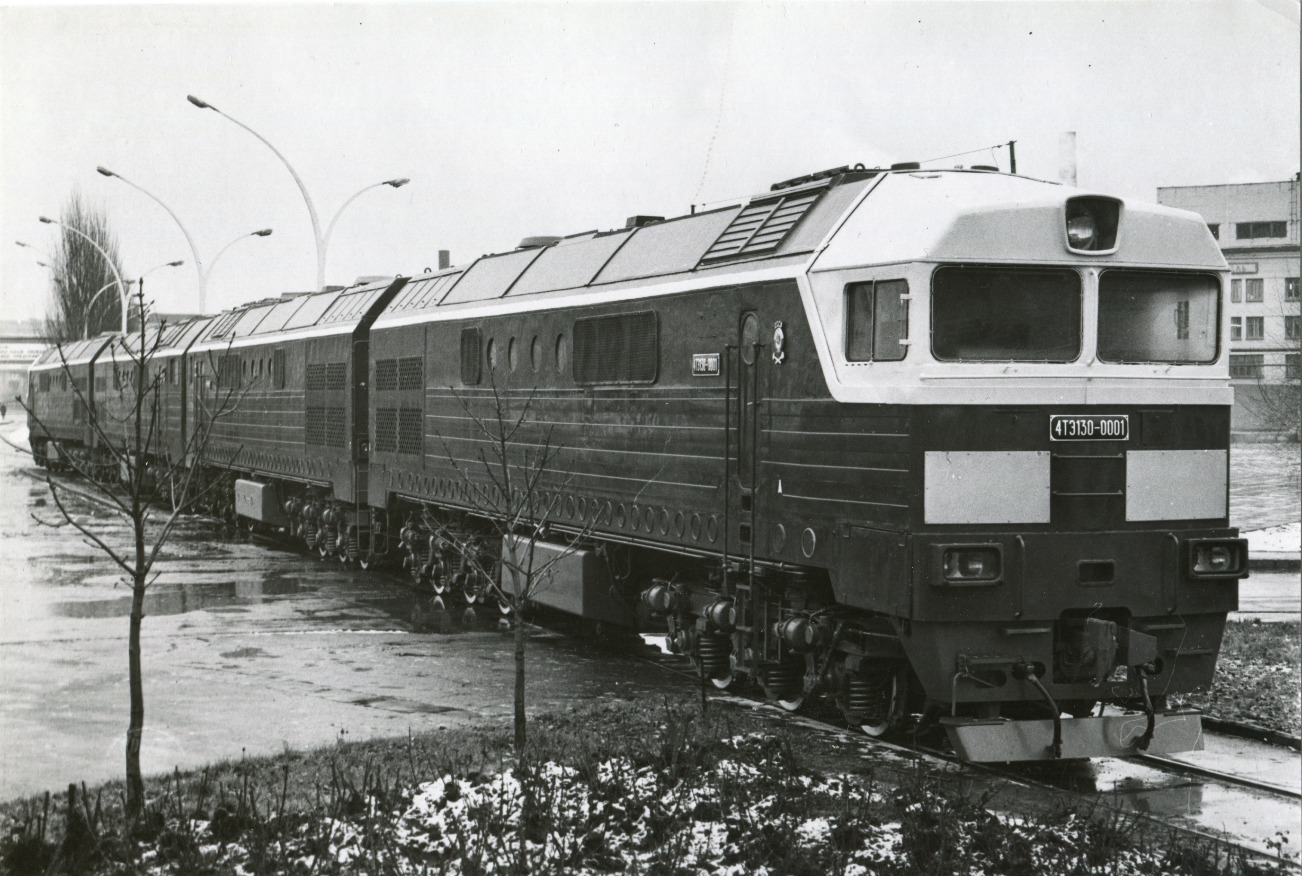
4TE130

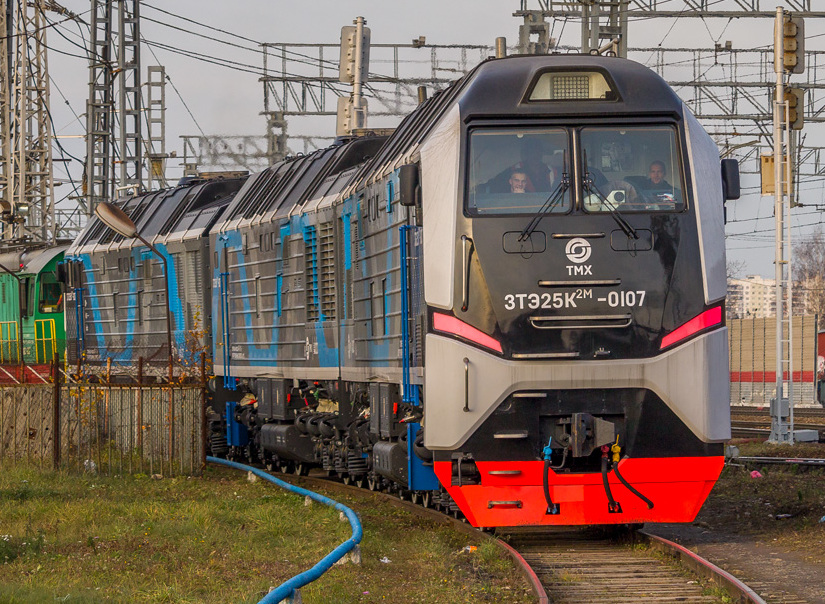
3TE25K^{2M}

Electric locomotives:

- Novocherkassk Electric Locomotive Plant (Russia) — 3ES5K / 4ES5K, 3ES4K, 3ES5S
  - Some A-units of VL80S electric locomotives have been converted into B-units
- Ural Locomotives (Russia) — 3ES6, 3ES8, 3ES10

Industrial electro-diesel locomotives:

- Dnipro Electric Locomotive Plant (Ukraine) — OPE1A, OPE1B, PE3T (versions with diesel-generator B–unit instead of one or both motorized dump cars)
Russian and Ukrainian multi-unit electric locomotives

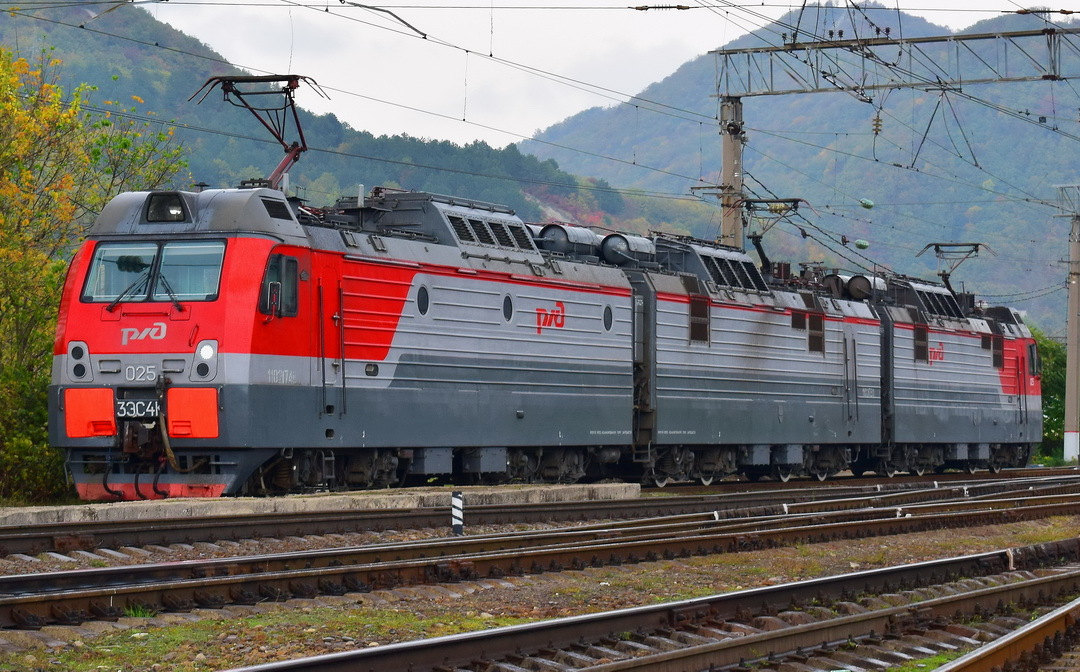
3ES4K locomotive has pantographs on all three units, including a B-unit

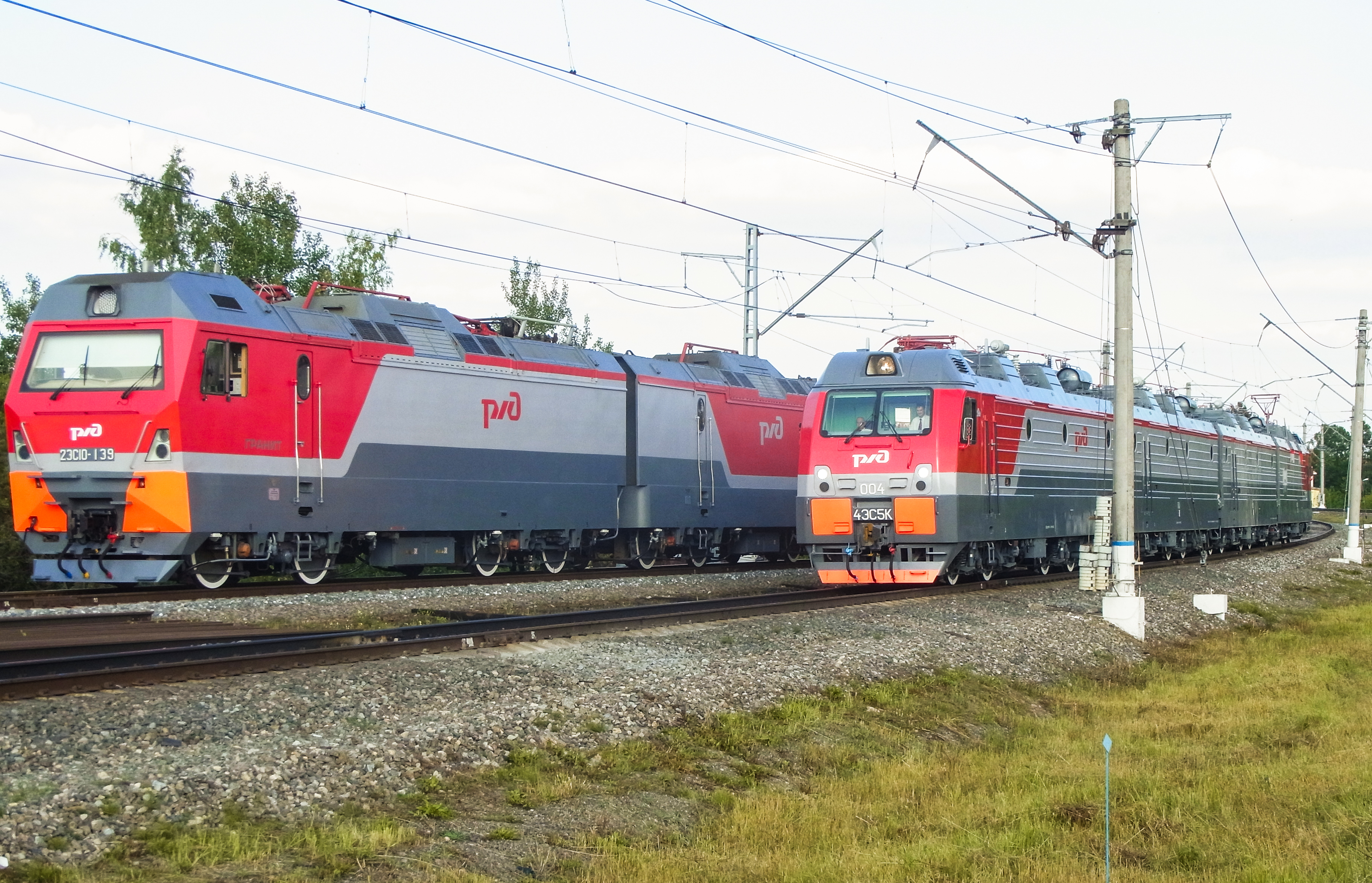
3ES10 (officially 2ES10 with 2ES10S B–unit) and 4ES5K electric locomotives have pantographs only on A-units

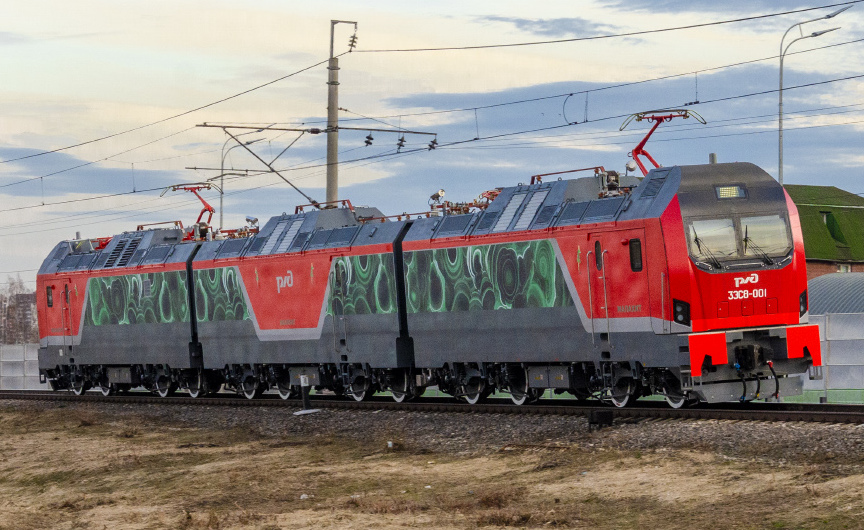
3ES8 electric locomotives has pantographs only on A-units

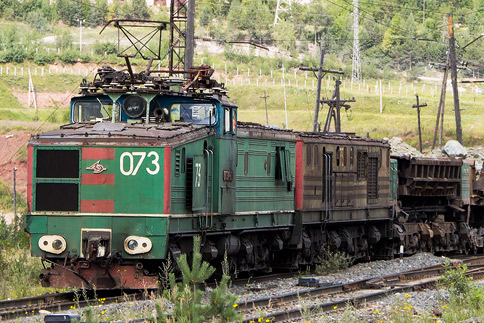
OPE1A electro-diesel locomotive with primary electric locomotive (A-unit), diesel-generator booster (B-unit) and motorized dump car

=== Australia ===
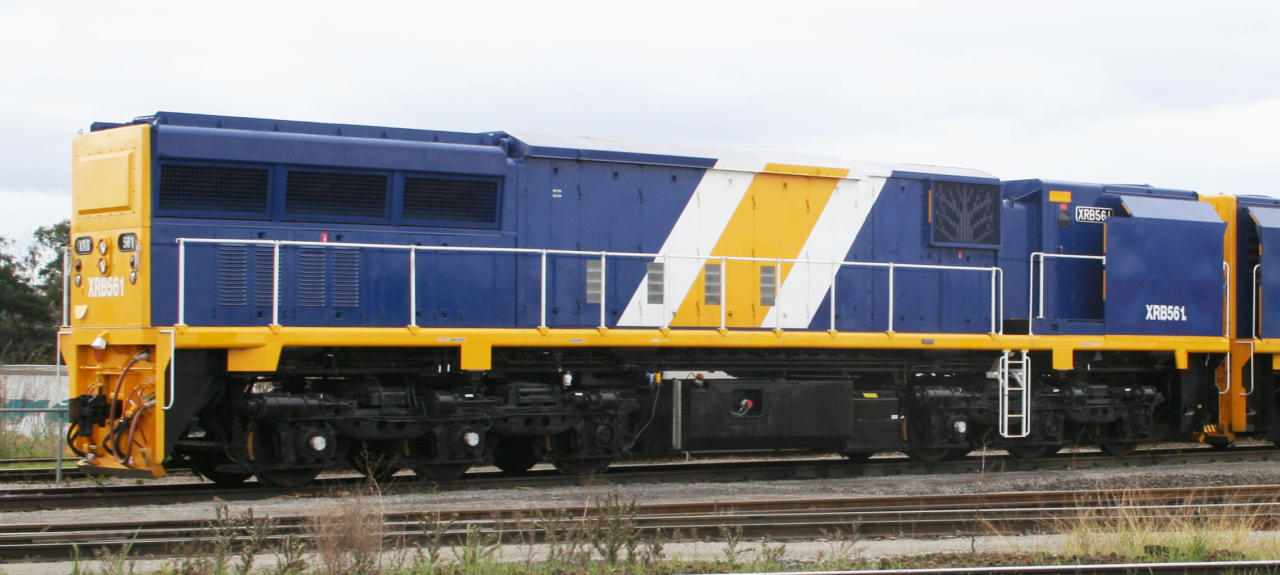
Australian XRB class locomotive

- 4 Australian National BUs, rebuilt from South Australian Railways 600 class by Morrison Knudsen, Whyalla in 1994
- 3 CM40-8ML – cabless version of C40-8 built on C636 frames for BHP in 1994
- 3 Pacific National XRB class built in 2005/06

=== Italy ===
- Class E.322 and Class E.324 electric locomotives (without cab and also pantograph).

=== United Kingdom ===
- British Rail Class 13 were diesel shunting locomotives with two semi-permanently coupled A- and B-units (also known as a master and slave formation) both converted from British Rail Class 08

=== Sweden ===
- Dm3 three-unit electric locomotives with A-B-A formation (originally they were two-unit Dm locomotives and later B-units were coupled in the middle)
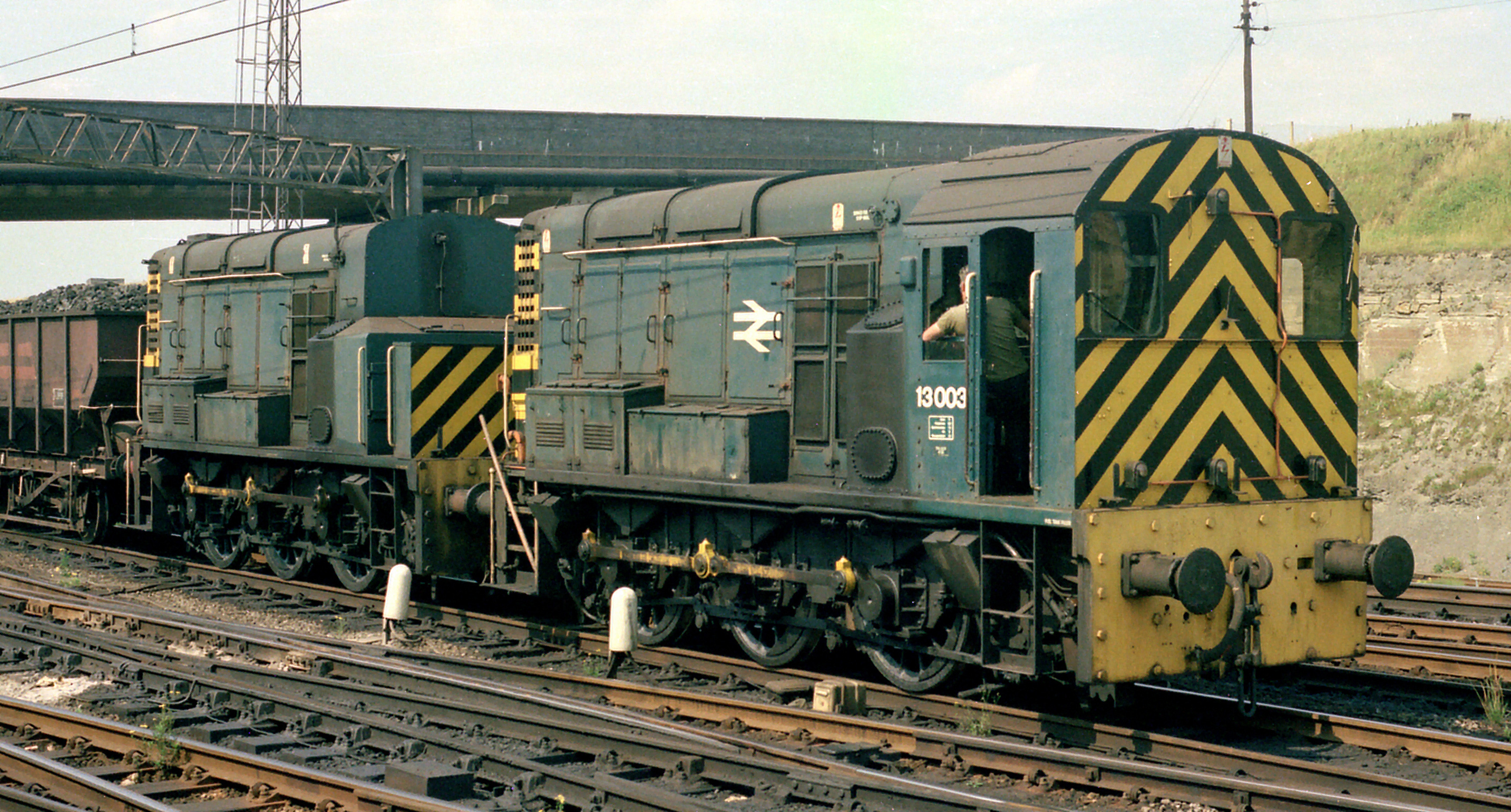
British Rail Class 13 diesel locomotive with a master A- and slave B-unit, the United Kingdom

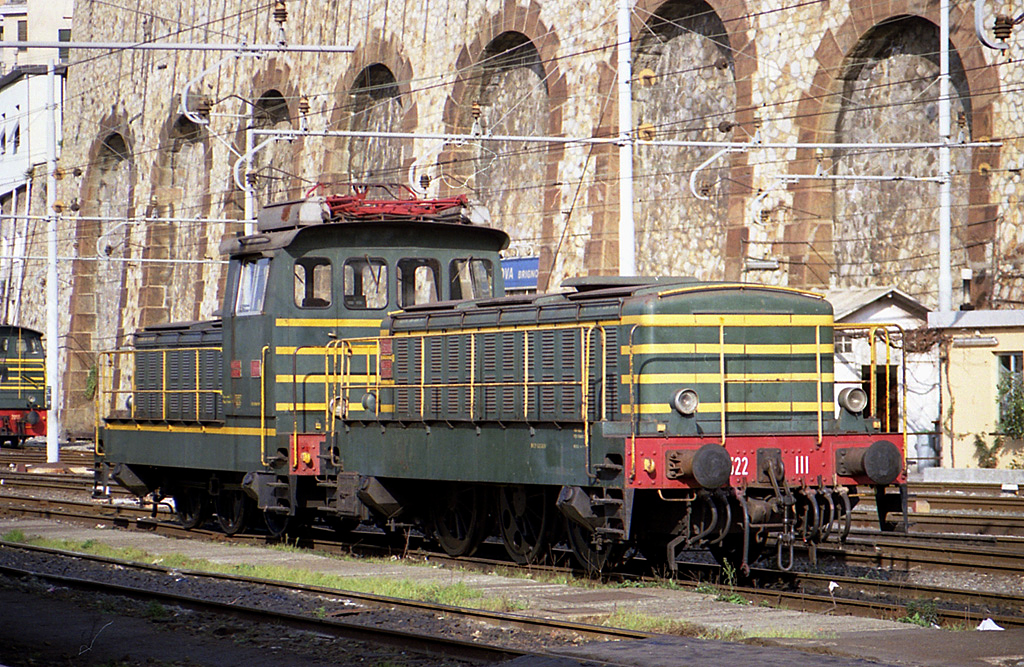
Italian electric locomotive E.321.111 (A-unit) coupled with E.322.111 (B-unit), Italy

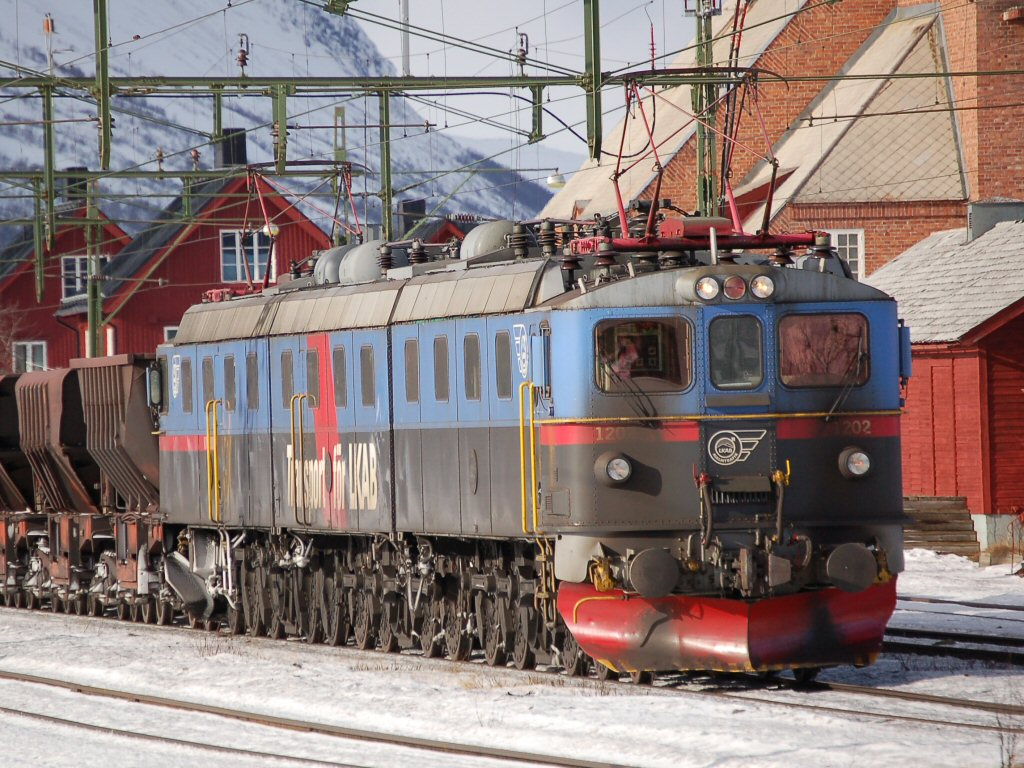
Dm3 three-unit electric locomotive, Sweden

=== Belgium ===
NMBS/SNCB, the national railway company of Belgium used to operate one locomotive which could be considered a B–unit. Originally a regular Type 82 shunting locomotive, locomotive 8275 had the top half of its control cab removed. Type 82 locomotives were mostly used in pairs for shunting heavy freight trains. Because of visibility issues, the engineer would have to get from one locomotive to the other with every direction change. In 1975, the railway company, seeking a solution for this problem, decided to adapt part of their Type 82 fleet. For testing purposes, 8275 had most of its cab removed, including the windows, the doors and the roof. The basic controls were left in place, covered by a removable metal plate, so it would be possible to control the locomotive on its own in case of emergency. With the cab removed, the engineer could see over the B–unit, so getting from one locomotive to the other was no longer necessary.

After extensive testing proved that the adaptions were unsuccessful, it was decided that no other units would be converted. However, 8275 was never converted back and served as Belgium's only B–unit, mostly in the port of Antwerp, until 2001, when it was scrapped after a collision with a truck. 8275 and the locomotive it was connected to were known as 'Koe en Kalf' (cow and calf) among railway staff.

=== China ===
Electric locomotives:

- HXD1 electric locomotives for coal railways of Shenhua Group may have one or four B-units. In 2013, CSR delivered two three-unit locomotives (A-B-A formation, 14.4 MW). In 2020, CRRC produced six-unit locomotives (A-B-B-B-B-A formation, 28.8 MW) for China Energy Investment the parent holding company of Shenhua Group. With a power output of 28.8 MW it is regarded as the world's most powerful multi-segment electric locomotive. These locomotives are dubbed the "Shenhua 24" Series.

Electro-diesel trainsets:

- FXN3-J diesel-electric locomotive with A- and B-units, derived from a FXN3 locomotive with two A-units, manufactured by CRRC Dalian. This locomotive operates as a power car of a push-pull CR200JS-G Fuxing electro-diesel trainset with HXD1D-J electric locomotive and nine passenger coaches. Both electric and diesel-electric locomotives have changed body design and are adapted for joint operation as part of a train. These trains are served on Sichuan–Tibet railway.
