= EMD F2 =

American diesel freight locomotive

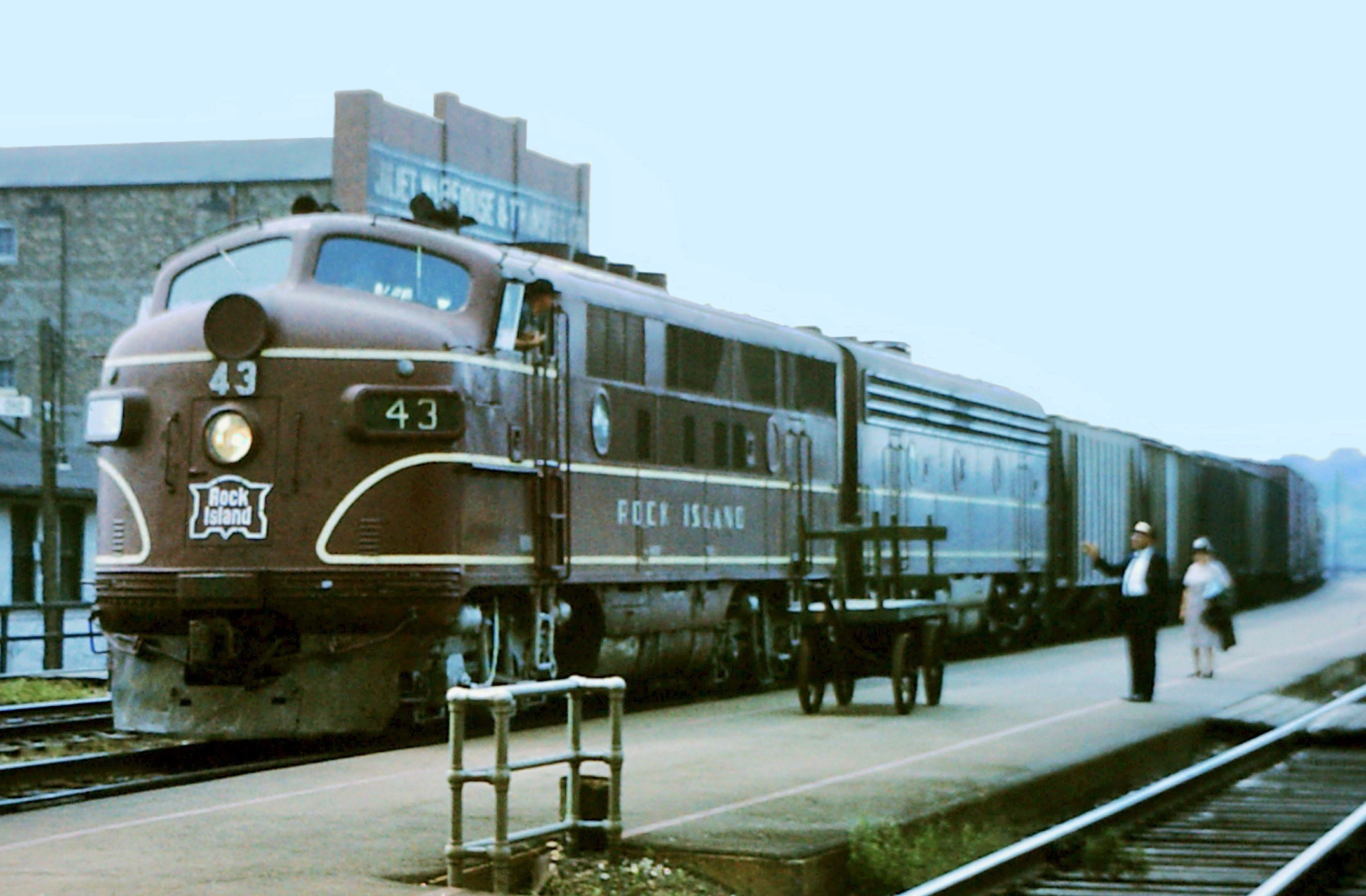
- Rock Island F2 locomotive no. 43 and a contemporary B unit lead a freight train through Joliet, Illinois, in August 1963
Type and origin
- Power type: Diesel-electric
- Builder: General Motors Electro-Motive Division (EMD)
- Model: F2
- Build date: July 1946 – November 1946
- Total produced: 74 A units, 30 B units
Specifications
- Configuration
  - AAR: B-B
- Gauge: 4 ft 8 1/2 in (1,435 mm)
- Prime mover: EMD 16-567B
- Generator: EMD D8
Performance figures
- Maximum speed: 65–102 mph (105–164 km/h)
- Power output: 1,350 hp (1000 kW)
Career
- Disposition: All scrapped

The EMD F2 was a freight-hauling diesel locomotive built by General Motors Electro-Motive Division between July 1946 and November 1946. It succeeded the FT model in GM-EMD's F-unit sequence, and was replaced in turn by the F3. The F2 was in many respects a transitional type between those two; it kept the 1,350 hp (1,010 kW) rated D8 generator from the FT due to late development of the new D12 generator intended for the F3, but in a revised carbody design and internal layout that would be continued through the rest of the F-unit series. 74 cab-equipped lead A units and 30 cabless booster B units were produced.

There are no reliable recognition features for an F2. They were built with what has become known as 'Type 1' side panels, with three portholes and no filter grilles, but this was carried over into early F3 production and in any case, could be changed later by the customer. Like some early F3s, they were built with small side number boards on the nose. They, and all subsequent F-units, are readily distinguished from the FT by having two exhaust stacks instead of four, and by having no large overhang on the end of the B units, while the trucks were a little further away from the other ends.

They also had four radiator fans at the center of the unit next to each other in line on the roof instead of two at each end. This external feature was the result of a major change in internal arrangement, the replacement of all mechanical and belt-drives for radiator fans and traction motor blowers with electric motors. Power for these accessories was produced by a new D14 three phase alternator built into the main DC generator, called a “companion alternator”. This device has been used in all later EMD road locomotives to the present.

All F2's were scrapped, making them the only EMD F-unit model with no extant examples.

== Original owners ==
EMD built 104 F2 locomotives: 74 A units and 30 B units. Nine railroads purchased A units; of these, four purchased B units. The most significant buyers were the Ferrocarriles Nacionales de México, Atlantic Coast Line Railroad, and Boston and Maine Railroad, which purchased 28, 24, and 21 locomotives, respectively.
