= EMD F3 =

Model of 1500 hp North American cab diesel locomotive

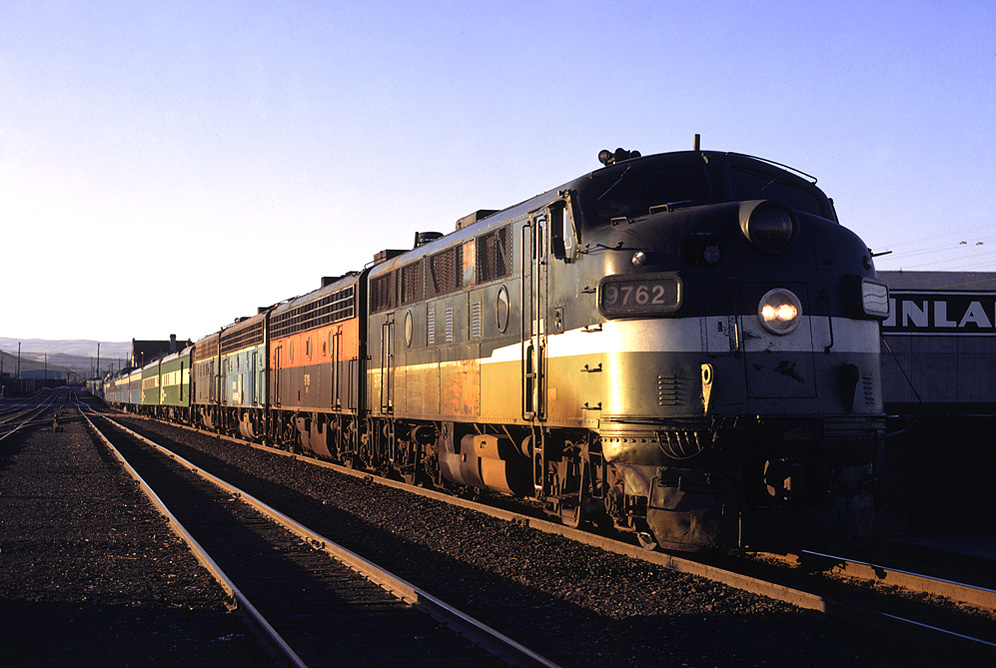
- BN #9762, ex-NP #6502, leading the North Coast Hiawatha into Yakima, Washington in August 1971.
Type and origin
- Power type: Diesel-electric
- Builder: General Motors Electro-Motive Division (EMD)
- Model: F3
- Build date: July 1945 – February 1949
- Total produced: 1,106 A units, 694 B units
Specifications
- Configuration
  - AAR: B-B
- Gauge: 4 ft 8 1/2 in (1,435 mm)
- Trucks: Blomberg B
- Wheel diameter: 40 in (1,016 mm)
- Minimum curve: 23° (250.79 ft or 76.44 m radius)
- Wheelbase: 39 ft (11.89 m)
- Length: 50 ft 8 in (15.44 m)
- Width: 10 ft 8 in (3.25 m)
- Height: 15 ft (4.57 m)
- Loco weight: 234,000 lb (106,000 kg)
- Fuel capacity: 1,200 US gal (4,500 L; 1,000 imp gal)
- Prime mover: EMD 16-567B
- RPM range: 275-800
- Engine type: Two-stroke V16 diesel
- Aspiration: Roots blower
- Displacement: 9,072 cu in (148.66 L)
- Generator: EMD D-12
- Traction motors: (4) EMD D-17-B or D-27-B
- Cylinders: 16
- Cylinder size: 8 1/2 in × 10 in (216 mm × 254 mm)
Performance figures
- Maximum speed: 102 mph (164 km/h)
- Power output: 1,500 hp (1.1 MW)
- Tractive effort: 55,000 lb (25,000 kg)

The EMD F3 is a 1,500-horsepower (1,100 kW) B-B freight- and passenger-hauling carbody diesel locomotive produced between July 1945 and February 1949 by General Motors’ Electro-Motive Division. Final assembly was at GM-EMD's La Grange, Illinois plant. A total of 1,106 cab-equipped lead A units and 694 cabless booster B units were built.

The F3 was the third model in GM-EMD's highly successful F-unit series of cab unit diesel locomotives, and it was the second most produced of the series. The F3 essentially differed from the EMD F2 in that it used the “new” D12 generator to produce more power and from the later EMD F7 in electrical equipment. Some late-model F3's had the same D27 traction motors, along with the heavier-duty electrical cables, used in the F7, and were referred to as model F5 by EMD's Engineering Department.

== Design ==
The F3 used a 16-cylinder 567B series diesel engine developing 1,500 hp (1.1 MW) at 800 rpm. The 567 was purpose-designed for locomotive service, and is a mechanically-aspirated, two-stroke, 45 degree, V-type with 567 cu in (9.29 L) displacement per cylinder, for a total of 9,072 cu in (148.66 L). A direct current generator powered four traction motors, two on each Blomberg B truck. The F3 could be geared for either freight or passenger service, and had a maximum speed of 102 miles per hour (164 km/h) with passenger gearing.

The carbodies of the A units varied over the production history of the F3 and are grouped by historians into four phases. Phase I is similar to the F2, distinguished by three portholes on the side and “chicken wire” grilles along the top edge of the carbody. Phase II reduced the number of portholes to two and included wire mesh between the portholes. Phase III eliminated that mesh; Phase IV eliminated the top wire mesh in favor a stainless steel grille. EMD occasionally referred to the Phase IV locomotives as the F5 but this never became official.

Eighteen F3s and one F7 were rebuilt by the Illinois Central Gulf Railroad for commuter rail service in 1978–1979. The most significant changes was the installation of a separate generator for head-end power. Visually, the side panels with portholes were replaced. The rebuilt locomotives were designated FP10. These units, numbered 1100-1114 and 1150-1153, were used by MBTA Commuter Rail from 1979 to 1991, and then by the Metro-North Railroad until the arrival of modern Brookville BL20GH locomotives in 2008. Several have been preserved, including by the Gold Coast Railroad Museum, the Adirondack Railroad, and the Danbury Railway Museum.

== History ==
The F3 was designed as a follow-up to the successful EMD FT locomotive. The primary changes were threefold: mechanical reorganization of the interior to permit faster construction, an improved prime mover developing 1,500 hp (1.1 MW) instead of 1,350 hp (1.01 MW), and a new main generator (the D12) to handle the increased power output. After problems developed with the first set of demonstration locomotives, EMD introduced a modified design called the F2 using the generator (D4) from the FT. This limited power output to 1,350 hp (1.01 MW). EMD built 104 F2s while it worked to eliminate the problems with the D12 generator. Production of the F3 began in November 1946.

The F3 was a successful design that encouraged the process of dieselization in the United States. The Missouri–Kansas–Texas Railroad conducted extensive trials with EMD's demonstration unit against its own 2-8-2 locomotives, following which it ordered 21 F3s. The "Katy" was fully dieselized by 1952.

== Original owners ==
EMD built approximately 1,800 F3 locomotives: 1,106 A units and 694 B units. Forty-nine railroads purchased A units; of these, thirty-nine purchased B units. The three most significant buyers were the Union Pacific Railroad, Southern Railway, and Southern Pacific Railroad, which purchased 179, 178, and 160 locomotives, respectively. Other major buyers included the Pennsylvania Railroad, Chicago, Burlington and Quincy Railroad, and Atchison, Topeka and Santa Fe Railway.

== Preservation ==
Several F3s are preserved at tourist lines and museums, including:

- Alberta Railway Museum
- Danbury Railway Museum
- Steamtown National Historic Site

== Gallery ==
A unit carbodies of the F3
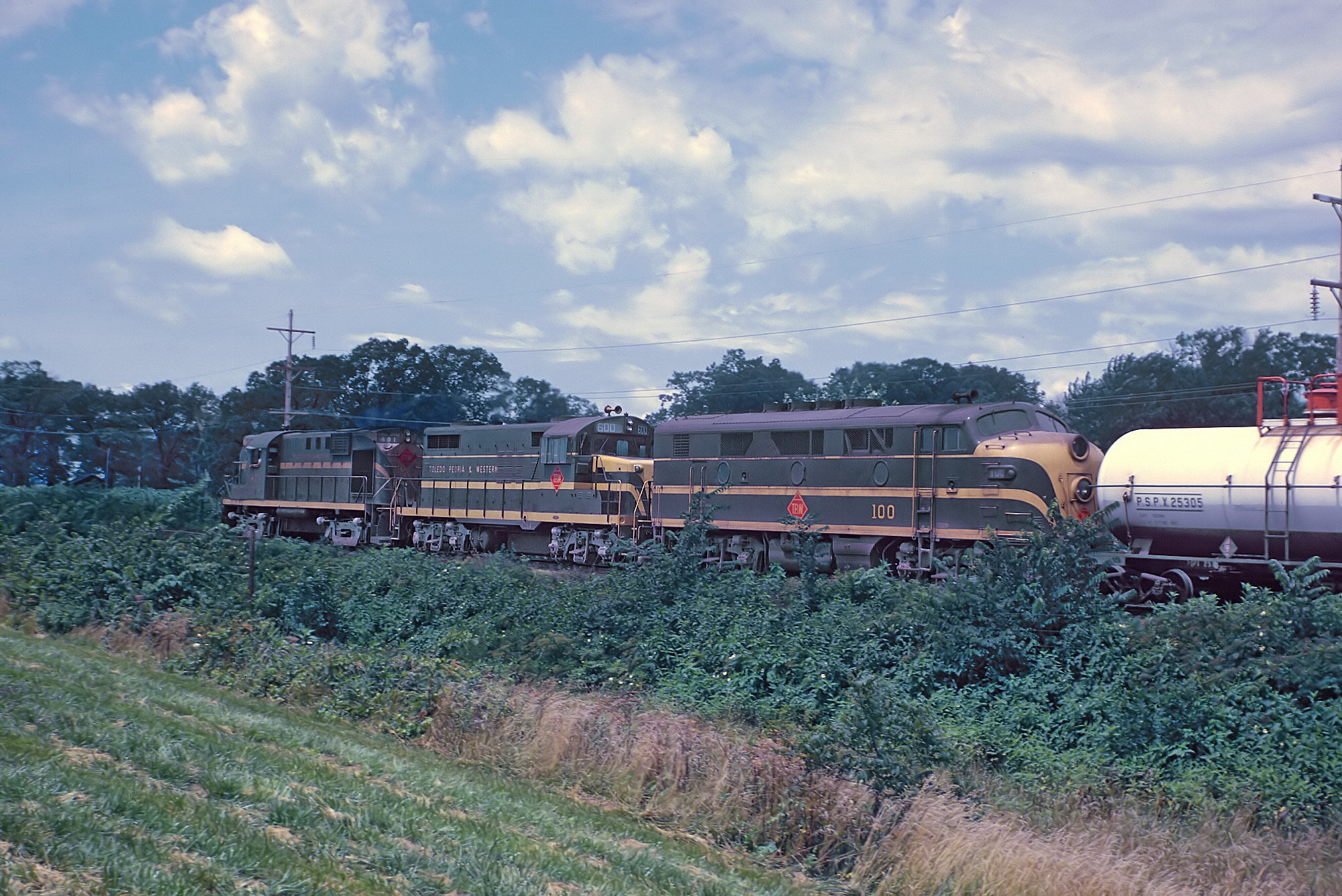
A Toledo, Peoria and Western Railway F3 (center) with Phase I body (three portholes)

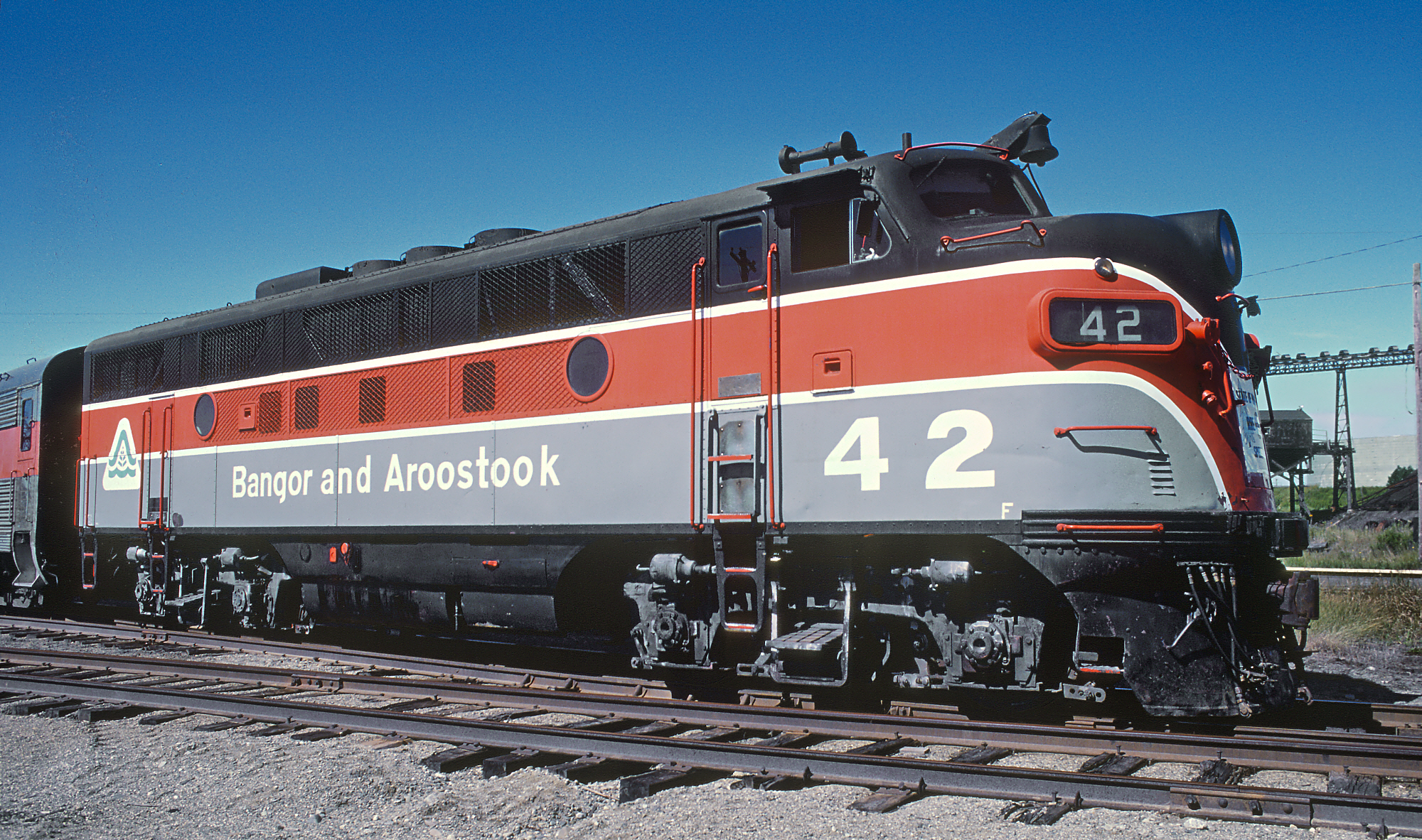
Bangor and Aroostook Railroad F3 with Phase II body

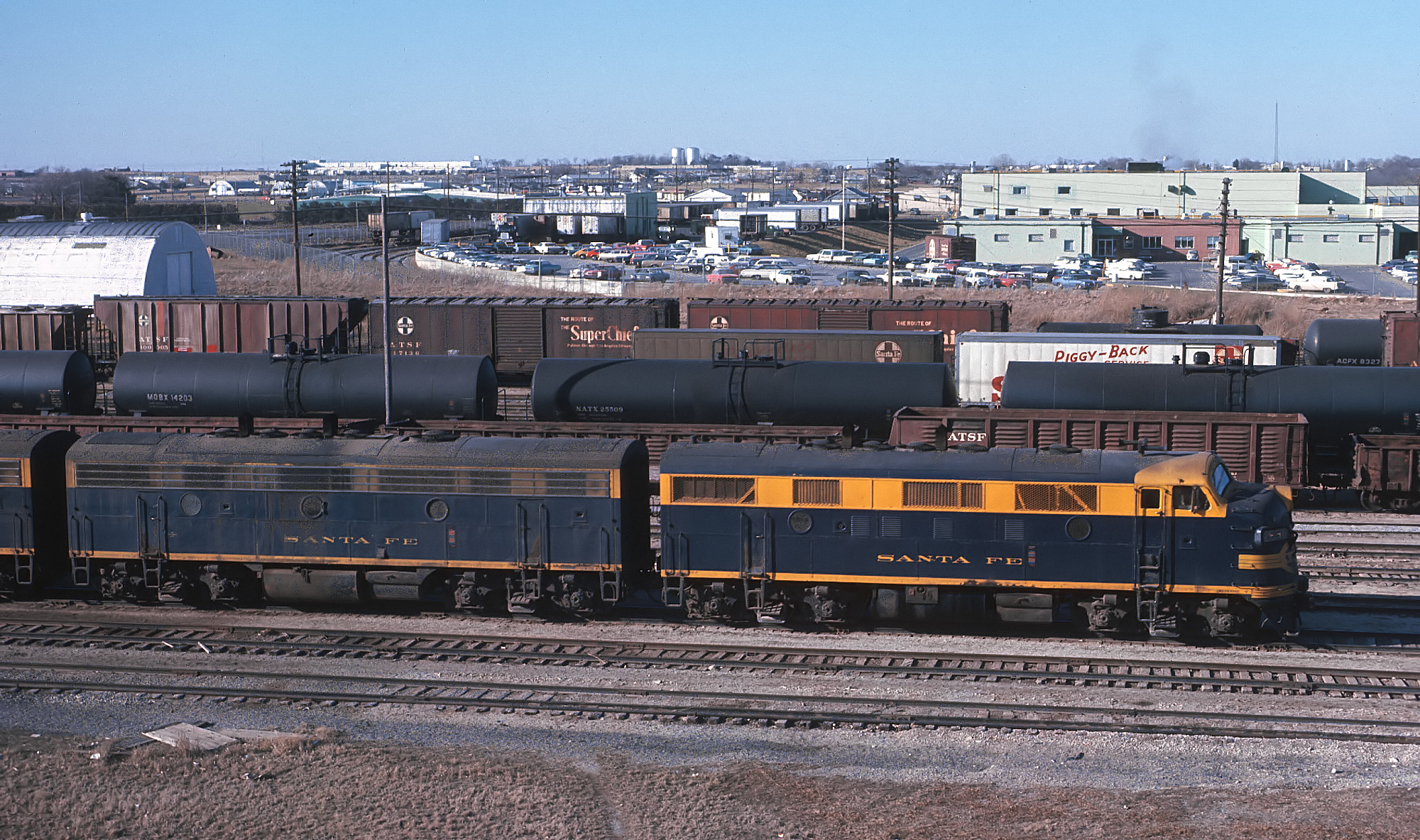
Atchison, Topeka and Santa Fe Railway locomotive with Phase III body

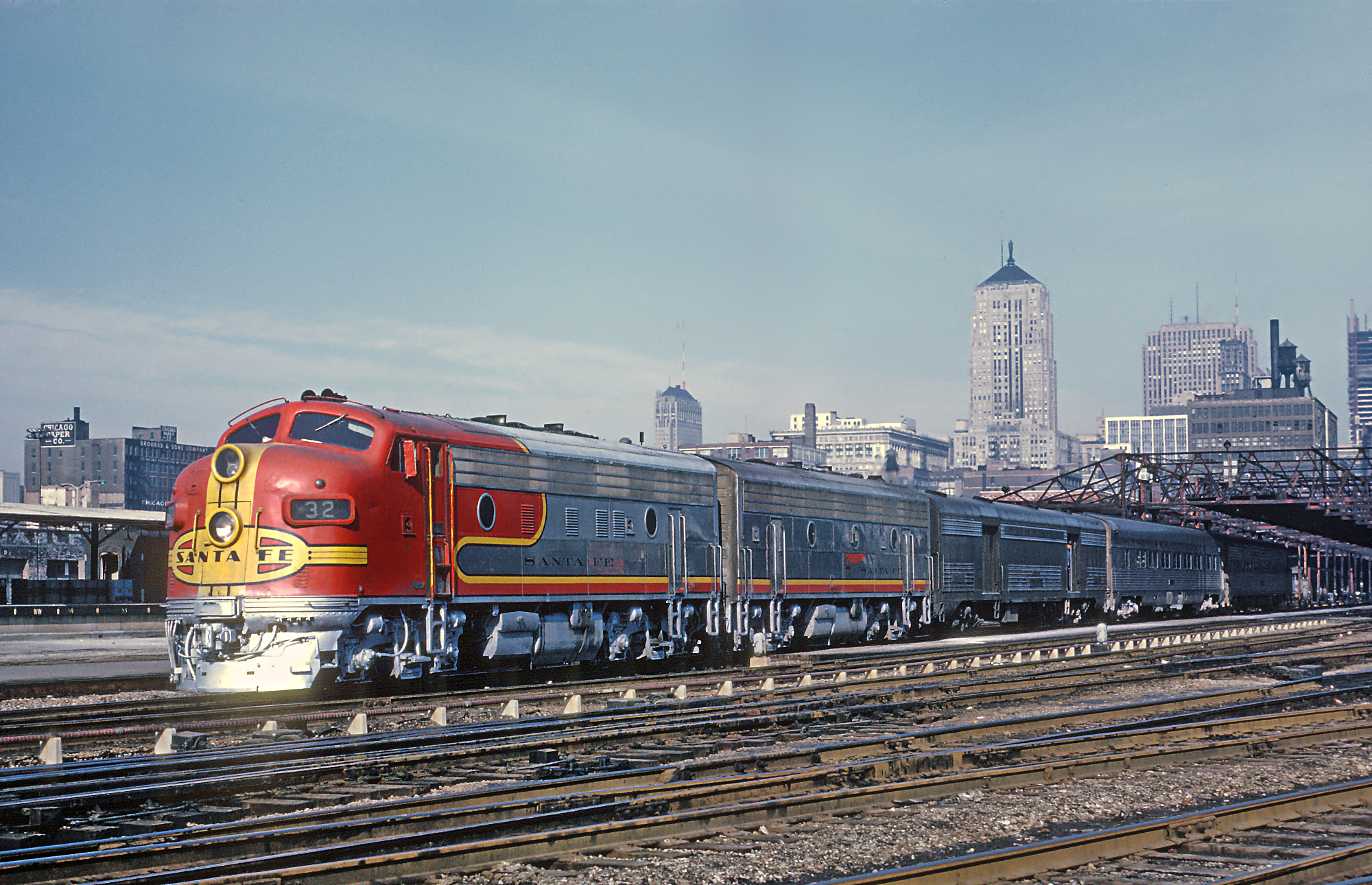
Atchison, Topeka and Santa Fe Railway locomotives with Phase IV body

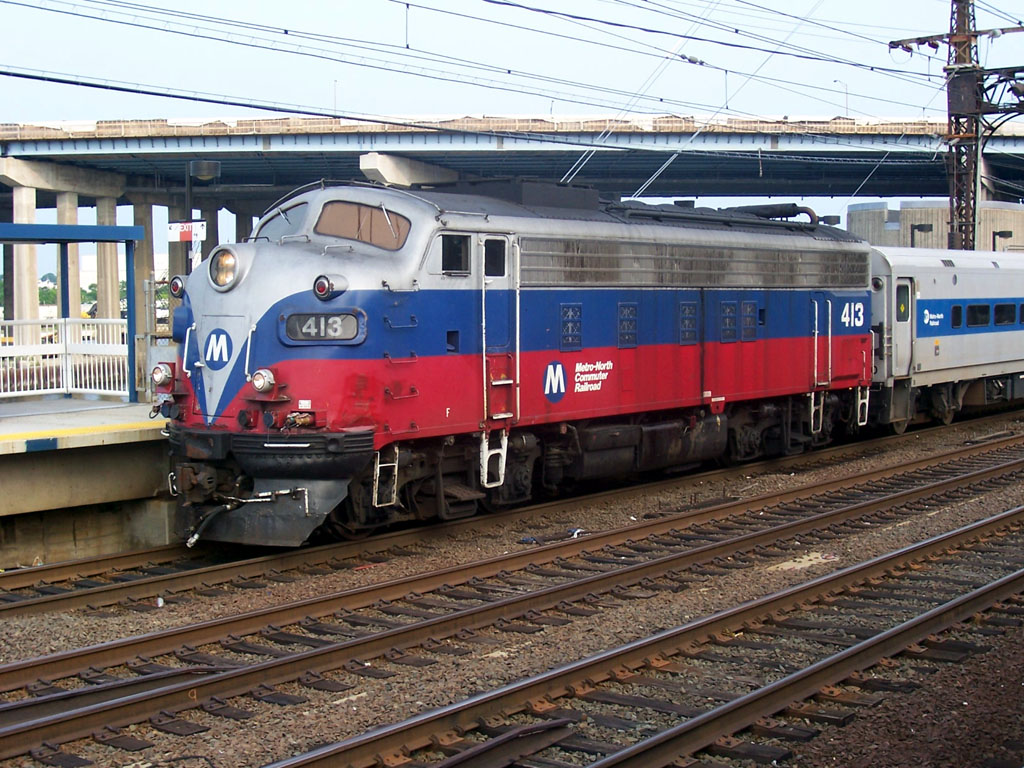
Metro-North Railroad FP10
