= EMD F-unit =

Line of diesel-electric locomotives

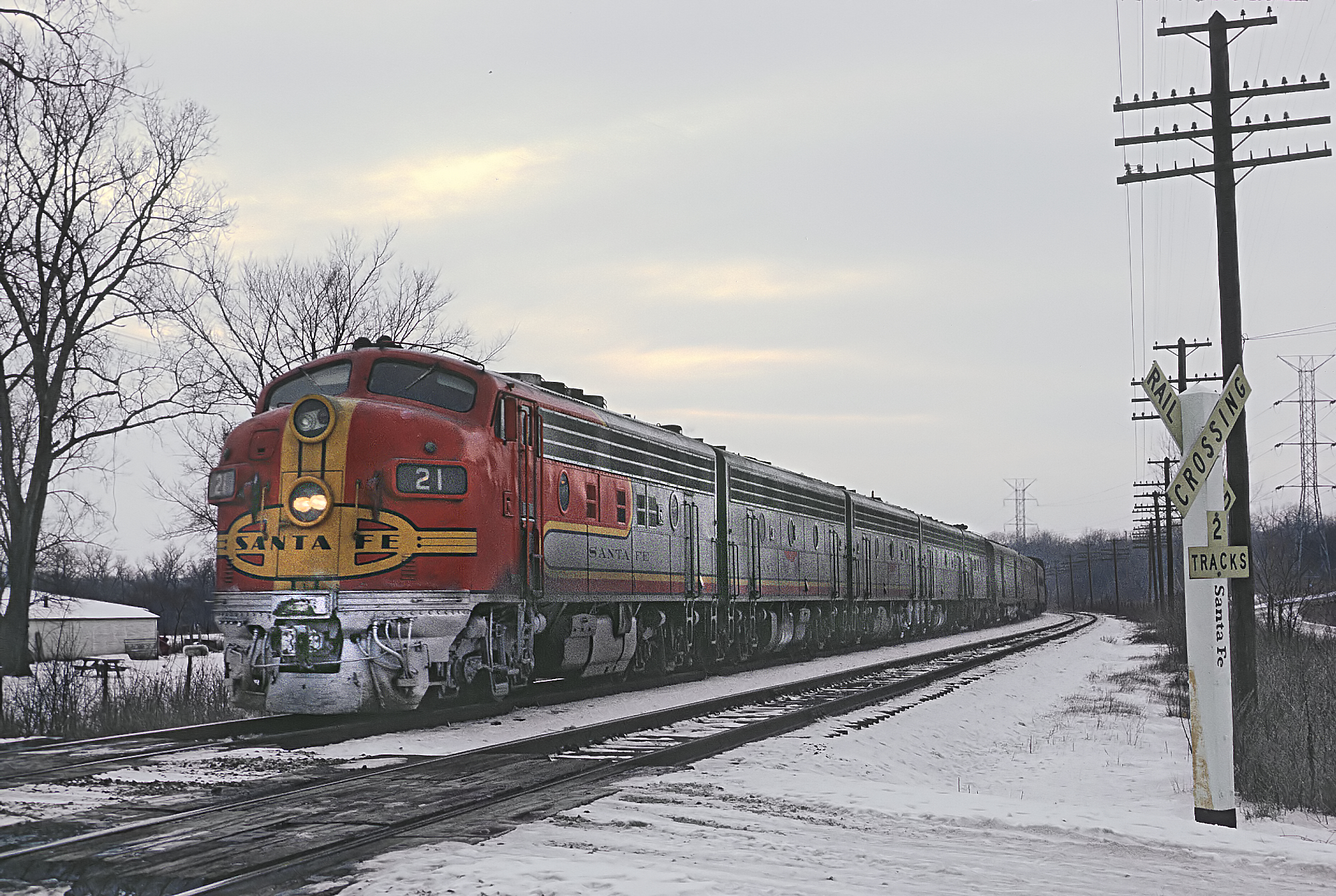
AT&SF No. 21, an EMD F3, leading the San Francisco Chief in Illinois in 1967

EMD F-units are a line of diesel-electric locomotives produced between November 1939 and November 1960 by General Motors Electro-Motive Division and General Motors-Diesel Division with 7,642 units produced. Final assembly for all F-units was at the GM-EMD plant at La Grange, Illinois, and the GMDD plant in London, Ontario. They were sold to railroads throughout the United States, Canada and Mexico, and a few were exported to Saudi Arabia. The term F-unit refers to the model numbers given to each successive type (i.e. F3, F7, etc.), all of which began with the letter F. The F originally meant "fourteen", as in 1,400 horsepower (1,000 kW), not "freight". Longer EMD E-units for passenger service had twin 900-horsepower (670 kW) diesel engines (called "prime movers" in that type of application). The E meant "eighteen" as in 1,800 horsepower (1,300 kW). Similarly, for early model EMD switchers, S meant "six hundred" and N meant "nine hundred horsepower" (450 and 670 kW respectively).

F-units were originally designed for freight service, although many without steam generators (for steam-heating passenger cars) pulled short-distance, mainly daytime, passenger trains. Some carriers even equipped small numbers of their Fs with steam generators for long-haul passenger service. On the other hand, Santa Fe maintained a large fleet of fully equipped, high-speed F3s and F7s in "warbonnet" paint schemes built exclusively for top-tier passenger trains, such as the Chief, Super Chief, and El Capitan. Almost all F-units were B-B locomotives, meaning that they ran on two Blomberg B two-axle trucks with all axles powered. The prime mover in F-units was a sixteen-cylinder EMD 567 series mechanically aspirated two-stroke diesel engine, progressing from model 16-567 through 16-567D.

Structurally, the locomotive was a carbody unit, with the body as the main load-bearing structure, designed like a bridge truss and covered with cosmetic panels. The so-called bulldog nose was a distinguishing feature of the locomotive's appearance and made a lasting impression in the mind of the traveling public.

The F-units were the most successful "first generation" road (main line) diesel locomotives in North America and were largely responsible for superseding steam locomotives in road freight service. Before that, diesel units were mostly built as switcher locomotives and only used in rail yards.

F-units were sometimes known as "covered wagons", due to the similarity in appearance of the roof of an F-unit to the canvas roof of a Conestoga wagon, an animal-drawn wagon used in the westward expansion of the United States during the late 18th and 19th centuries. When locomotives on a train included only F-units, the train would then be called a wagon train. Those two usages are still popular with the railfan community.

== Models ==
Model designation	Build year	Total produced	AAR wheel arrangement	Prime mover	Power output	Image
FT	1939–1945	555 A units, 541 B units	B-B (B-B+B-B with B unit)	EMD 16-567; EMD 16-567A	2,700 hp (2,000 kW) (with B unit)	
F2	1946	74 A units, 30 B units	B-B	EMD 16-567B	1,350 hp (1,000 kW)	
F3	1946–1949	1,111 A units, 696 B units	B-B	EMD 16-567B	1,500 hp (1,100 kW)	
F7	1949–1953	2,366 A units, 1,483 B units	B-B	EMD 16-567B	1,500 hp (1,100 kW)	
FP7	1949–1953	381 A units, no B units	B-B	EMD 567B	1,500 hp (1,200 kW)	Western Pacific 805-A, an FP7 preserved at the Western Pacific Railroad Museum in California
F9	1953–1960	99 A units, 156 B units	B-B	EMD 16-567C	1,750 hp (1,200 kW)	
FP9	1954–1959	90 A units, no B units	B-B	EMD 567C	1,750 hp (1,300 kW)	RLGN 1400 at Waterloo, Ontario, October 7, 2003
FL9	1956–1960	60 A units, no B units	B-A1A	EMD 567C or EMD 567D1; plus 660 V DC (3rd rail)	567C: 1,750 hp (1,300 kW); 567D1: 1,800 hp (1,340 kW)	

== Model development ==
The FT, introduced in 1939 with the new 1,350 hp (1.01 MW) 567 engine and Blomberg B trucks, was a successful design, and remained in production during WWII.

The F3 (1946) had a different roof arrangement that included the replacement of the FT's boxy dynamic brake structure with two under-roof grids, two exhaust stacks instead of four, and four cooling fans grouped together instead of separated pairs of cooling fans. The F3 was also 2 feet (0.61 m) longer than the FT to allow a standard draft gear to be installed at the rear of the unit. The 567B engine was uprated to 1,500 hp (1.1 MW). Some F3s were nicknamed "chickenwire" for the type of engine room air-intake structure along the sides.

The F7 (1949) and F9 (1954) were evolutionary: the F7 had improved traction motors, the F9 had a 1,750 hp (1.30 MW) 567C engine. A louver arrangement over the vents changed their appearance from the F3.

There were also 4-foot-longer (1.2 m) versions, the FP7 and FP9, the extra length being used to house a tank for extra water capacity. Only one F model did not have Blomberg B trucks: the FL9 electro-diesel locomotive had a lightweight Flexicoil B in front and a standard passenger A-1-A at the rear.

Model descriptions are as built, but EMC/EMD locomotives are often rebuilt to newer standards.

== Engine and powertrain ==
The F series used a 16-cylinder version of the 567 series diesel engine, introduced in 1939. The 567 was designed specifically for railroad locomotives, a mechanically aspirated 2 stroke 45 degree V type with 567 cu in (9.29 L) displacement per cylinder, for a total of 9,072 cu in (148.66 L). An ongoing engine improvement program saw the FT's original 1,350 hp (1,010 kW) up-rated to 1,800 hp (1,300 kW) in the FL9 by the end of F unit production. A DC generator powered four traction motors, two on each truck. The Blomberg B truck first used in the FT became the EMD production standard, being used until 1995. EMC/EMD built all of its major components after 1939.

== Passenger service ==
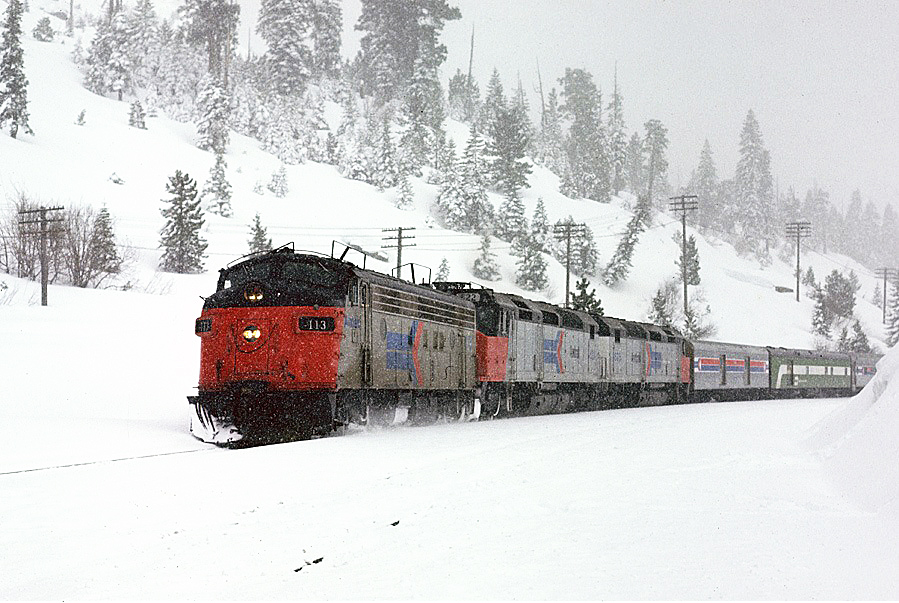
Amtrak No. 113, an EMD FP7, leading two EMD SDP40Fs with the San Francisco Zephyr at the Yuba Gap in 1975

While the F-unit series was originally conceived for freight service, many were used to haul passenger trains. The original EMC FT demonstrator was equipped with a steam generator in the B units for train heating. Several railroads took advantage of the large space in the rear of their B units to add steam generators. The first FTs built strictly as a passenger unit was the Santa Fe 167 four unit set in February 1945. Learning from that, EMD offered an optional steam generator on all later F unit models. It was mounted at the rear of the car body; steam-generator equipped locomotives can be recognized by the exhaust stack and safety valves protruding at the rear of the roof.

The F-units were popular passenger locomotives on mountain grades (where they were recommended by EMD), because a four-unit set had more motored axles than a trio of E-units of equivalent power (16 versus 12) and thus had less chance of overloading the traction motors. Additionally, the four F-unit set had all its weight on driven wheels and was thereby capable of greater tractive effort. The AT&SF Super Chief, CB&Q/D&RGW/WP California Zephyr, and GN Empire Builder all used F units on their Chicago-West Coast routes in the 1950s. The F7 was also popular for commuter lines and other passenger service where the trains were short.

== Options ==
There were several options that could be specified by customers for the F-units, such as type and mounting location of horns and bells.

=== Dynamic brakes ===
Dynamic brakes were an option on F units ordered by railroads operating in mountainous terrain and with steep grades.

=== Passenger or freight pilot ===
Either a passenger or freight style pilot could be ordered. The passenger pilot, similar to that standard on E-units, slopes smoothly down from the bottom of the nose, making a single slope all the way down from the headlight. The coupler is retractable with concealing doors. The result is a very attractive appearance that enhanced the impression of a powerful and speedy machine.

The freight pilot curves inward a little way below the bottom of the nose before sloping out again, to give more clearance to the coupler and hoses. The coupler is fixed and protrudes through a rectangular opening in the pilot.

== Licensees ==
Locomotives based on the F7 design were built by licensees in Europe and Australia.

== See also ==
- CF7 - A rebuild of an EMD F unit by the Atchison, Topeka and Santa Fe Railway.
