= EMD FT =

American cab locomotive

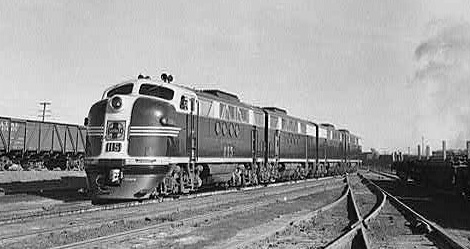
- Atchison, Topeka, and Santa Fe Railroad diesel freight locomotive which has just come out of the roundhouse, Winslow, Arizona.
Type and origin
- Power type: Diesel-electric
- Builder: General Motors Electro-Motive Division (EMD)
- Model: FTA (cab unit), FTB (regular booster), and FTSB (short booster)
- Build date: March 1939 – November 1945
- Total produced: 555 A units, 541 B units
Specifications
- Configuration
  - AAR: B-B (B-B+B-B for AB set)
- Gauge: 4 ft 8 1/2 in (1,435 mm)
Performance figures
- Maximum speed: 65–95 mph (105–153 km/h)
- Power output: 1,350 hp (1,010 kW) for A unit. 2,700 hp (2,000 kW) for AB set
Career
- Operators: Atchison, Topeka & Santa Fe Railway, Great Northern Railway, Northern Pacific Railroad
- Locale: United States
- Disposition: Two A Units, Three B Units preserved, remainder either rebuilt or presumed scrapped

The EMD FT is a 1,350-horsepower (1,010 kW) diesel-electric locomotive that was produced between March 1939 and November 1945, by General Motors' Electro-Motive Corporation (EMC), later known as GM Electro-Motive Division (EMD). The "F" stood for Fourteen Hundred (1,400) horsepower (rounded from 1,350) and the "T" for Twin, as it came standard in a two-unit set. The design was developed from the TA model built for the C,RI&P in 1937, and was similar in cylinder count, axle count, length, and layout. All told 555 cab-equipped ”A” units were built, along with 541 cabless booster or ”B” units, for a grand total of 1,096 units. The locomotives were all sold to customers in the United States. It was the first model in EMD's very successful F-unit series of cab unit freight diesels and was the locomotive that convinced many U.S. railroads that the diesel-electric freight locomotive was the future. Many rail historians consider the FT one of the most important locomotive models of all time.

== Design and production ==
The first units produced for a customer were built in December 1939 and January 1941 for the Atchison, Topeka and Santa Fe Railway and numbered the 100 set. These were the first diesel-electric locomotives ever produced with dynamic braking, a system developed at the insistence of the railroad and with its assistance. Initially the four-unit, coupler-equipped set featured two booster units between two cab units in the manner of the demonstrator set. The Brotherhoods of Locomotive Engineers and Firemen, however, insisted that the two cabs required two crews, so the railway had EMD produce extra boosters, and renumbered its earliest sets into four unit sets with one cab unit and three boosters. Negotiation with the unions soon rectified the situation, but as the road's earliest units were geared for higher speeds than subsequent units, these sets continued to be composed of one FTA cab unit and three FTB boosters. This is why the road had ten more FTB booster units than FTA cab units. The original A-B-B-A demonstrator set was sold to the Southern Railway.

The FT was equipped with the EMD 567 medium-speed two-stroke cycle Diesel engine, along with its many successors.

FTs were generally marketed as semi-permanently coupled A-B sets (a lead unit and a cabless booster connected by a solid drawbar) making a single locomotive of 2,700 hp (2,000 kW). Many railroads used pairs of these sets back to back to make up a four-unit A-B-B-A locomotive rated at 5,400 hp (4,000 kW). Some railroads purchased semi-permanently coupled A-B-A three-unit sets of 4,050 hp (3,020 kW). All units in a consist could be run from one cab; multiple unit (MU) control systems linked the units together. Some roads, like the initial customer Santa Fe, ordered all their FTs with regular couplers on both ends of each unit for added flexibility. This package included "hostler" controls for B units, enabling these units to be operated independently of A units for moving within yard limits, and a fifth porthole was provided in the carbody to enable the "hostler" some measure of visibility. Internally, EMD referred to these units as model FS.

== Engine and powertrain ==
The FT introduced a 16-cylinder version of the 567 (later 567A) series engine developing 1,350 hp (1,010 kW) at 800 rpm. Designed specifically for railroad locomotives, this mechanically scavenged (Roots-blown) two stroke 45 degree V type, with an 8 1/2 in (216 mm) bore by 10 in (254 mm) stroke giving 567 cubic inches (9.29 L) displacement per cylinder, remained in production until 1966. A D8 D.C. generator provides power to four D7 traction motors, two on each truck, one on each axle, in a B-B arrangement. The Blomberg design introduced here has been EMD's standard B truck, used with few exceptions through the F59PHI of 1994. EMD built all its own components after 1939.

Only the four demonstrator FTs used the 567 U-Deck engine. Those engines were replaced in the demonstrators by 567 V-Deck engines before sale to the Southern in May 1941. All FT locomotives built between December 1940 and February 1943 used the 567 V-Deck engine. The 567 V-Deck engine was replaced in production with the 567A engine in May 1943. All subsequent FT locomotives built from May 1943 to the end of production in November 1945 used the 567A engine.

== Body recognition and appearance ==
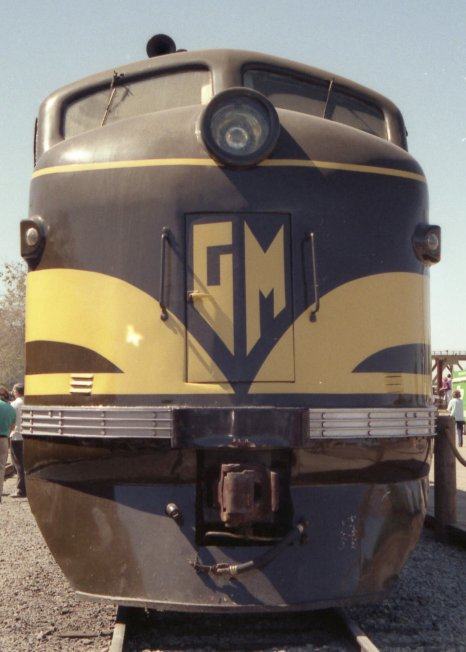
The nose of EMD 103 at the California State Railroad Museum in 1991

The FT is very similar to the later F-units in appearance, but there are some differences that render it distinguishable from later EMD freight cab units. The side panels of the FT were different, but it was fairly common for railroads to alter them to make an earlier unit appear later. As built, FT units had four porthole windows spaced closely together along their sides, and B units with couplers on both ends had a fifth window on one side for the hostler position, if equipped with hostler controls.

The roof is a more reliable indication; FTs had four exhaust stacks along the centerline (flanked by boxy structures if dynamic brakes were included). The radiator fans were recessed within the carbody, and arranged in two pairs, one near each end of the locomotive. Later units have the fans grouped together, and their shrouding extended atop the roof.

The overhangs of the body past the trucks differ in the FT compared to later units. The B-units of FTs ordered in semi-permanently coupled A-B sets, and those with couplers on both ends, have a large overhang on one end (the coupler-equipped end on the paired units) featured on no other EMD B-units. This is not present on the B-units in semi-permanently coupled A-B-A sets, which were called FTSB units (for Short Booster). At other locations, except the cab front, the FT units have less of an overhang than later units; the trucks appear to be right at the ends of the car bodies.

As with other early cab units - but unlike "hood" type locomotives - the F (and E) series used the body as a structural element, similar to a truss bridge. Most of EMD's newer passenger locomotives have a non-structural “cowl” type body built on an underframe derived from freight designs.

== Wartime restrictions ==
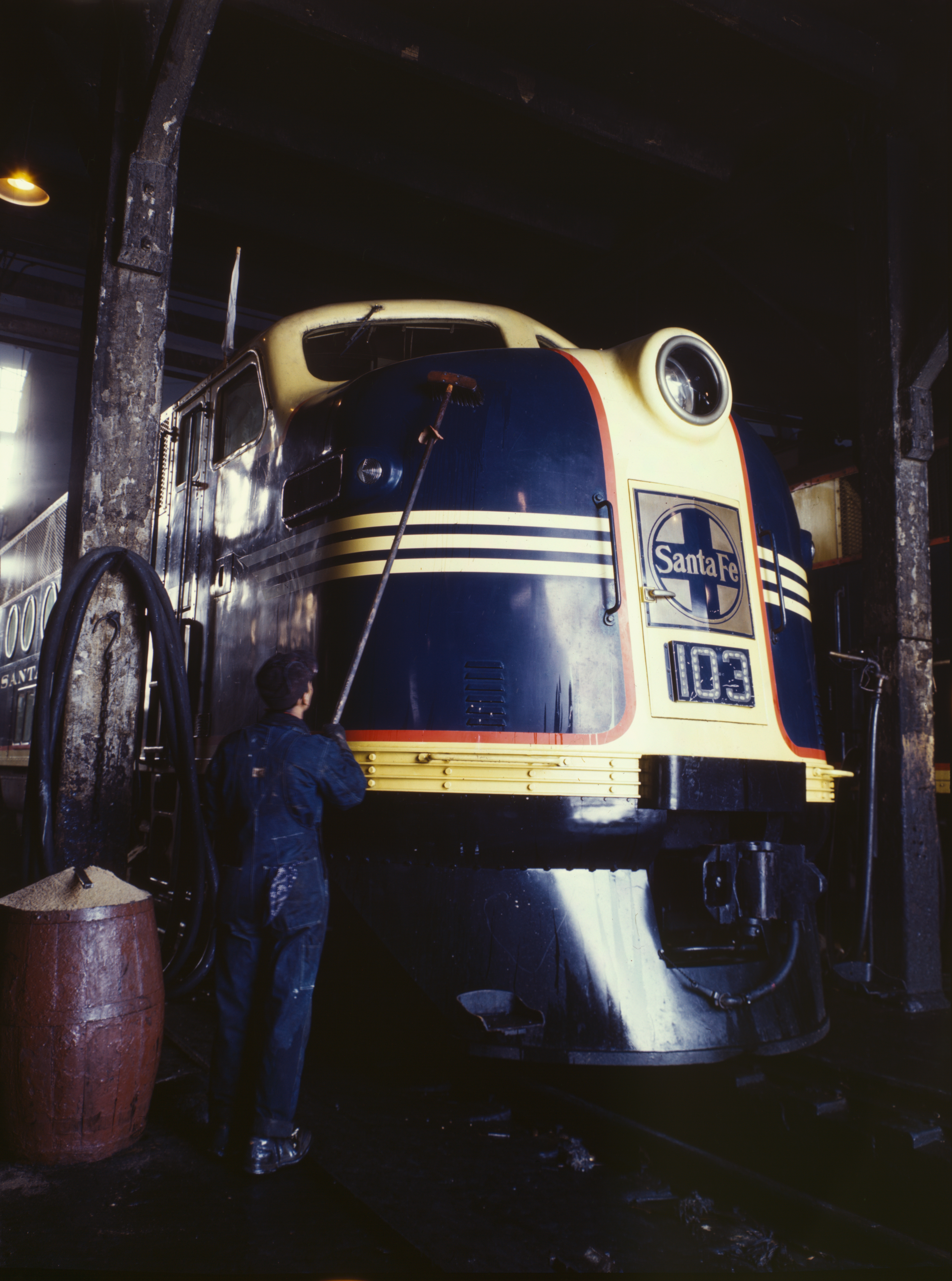
An EMD model FT of the Atchison, Topeka and Santa Fe Railway receives service during World War II.

During World War II, locomotive production was regulated by the War Production Board. First priority for the diesel prime movers' manufacturing capability, as well as the materials used in the fabrication and assembly of the engines, electric generators and traction motors was for military use. Steam locomotives could be built with fewer precious materials, and with less conflict with military needs. It was also opportune for eastern railroads to stick with coal-fired steam power while petroleum distribution to the east coast was disrupted in early days of the US war effort. The traditional locomotive builders were prohibited from developing or building diesel road locomotives until early 1945, with the exception of a few dual-service ALCO DL-109s for the New Haven Railway. EMD, however, was purely a diesel builder, and therefore was allowed to build diesel freight locomotives, as consistent with fulfilling Navy needs for their 567 engines. The WPB assigned the FTs to the railroads it deemed most able to benefit from the new locomotives. Santa Fe received by far the largest allocation, given its heavy war traffic and the difficulty and expense of providing water for steam locomotives on its long desert stretches. Were it not for the wartime restrictions, many more FTs would have been built. Most railroads wanted diesels, but often had to settle for steam locomotives.

The wartime restrictions on other manufacturers' diesel programs helped ensure EMD's dominance of the postwar diesel market, as EMD exited the wartime restrictions with a fully mature diesel engine suited for high capacity road use. Other locomotive manufacturers, under extreme competitive pressure from EMD's high-powered and reliable 567 engine in the early postwar era, embarked upon crash development programs that yielded unsatisfactory results. EMD's advantage resulted in their selling the vast majority of units in the dieselization era and a death spiral for all who tried to compete with them in the early postwar market.

== Subsequent models ==
The FT was discontinued in late 1945, replaced in production by the F2, which retained the 1,350 hp (1,010 kW) rating of the FT, but with upgraded electrical and control equipment. Additionally, the mechanically driven cooling fans, which required constant tending by the locomotive's fireman, were replaced with electrically driven fans which were automatically controlled, a system which is still in use to this day. The F2 was produced only in 1946, and afterward was replaced by updated models in the EMD F-unit series, such as the F3, F7, and F9.

== Original buyers ==
EMD built approximately 1,096 FT locomotives: 555 A units and 541 B units. Twenty-three railroads purchased locomotives; all of them purchased both A and B units. The largest single buyer was the Atchison, Topeka and Santa Fe Railway, which purchased 155 A units and 165 B units. Another major buyer was the Great Northern Railway, which purchased 51 A units and 45 B units.

== Surviving units ==
Multiple EMD FT units survive today, two A units and three B units.

=== A units ===
- EMD #103, the lead A-unit from a demonstrator set, is displayed at the National Museum of Transportation in St. Louis, Missouri. The two B units and the other A were eventually scrapped after years of service. The B unit now on display at Roanoke, originally just a regular FT B unit, was later stripped of its engine and other locomotive parts and converted to a boiler car. It later went to the museum in Virginia. In 1989, this former FT B unit, as well as the genuine demonstrator A unit from St. Louis, They toured together and then were returned to their respective museum owners.
- Ferrocarril Sonora Baja California (FSBC) 2203-A, is on display at the National Museum of Mexican Railroads in Puebla. It was originally built for the Northern Pacific Railway.

=== B Units ===
Three FT-Bs survive today. All three were rebuilt by the Southern Railway as heater cars, and had their prime movers removed.

- Southern heater car #960601 is preserved as EMD #103B at the Virginia Museum of Transportation in Roanoke, Virginia. In 1989, the #960601 was painted in the demonstrator scheme for EMD's 50th anniversary celebrations for the FT. From 2015-2020, it was displayed alongside #103 again at the National Museum of Transportation in St Louis, Missouri.
- Southern heater car #960602 is preserved in Conway, South Carolina.
- Southern heater car #960604 is preserved at the North Carolina Transportation Museum in Spencer, North Carolina.

== See also ==
- List of GM-EMD locomotives

== Bibliography ==
- Cook, Preston (Spring 2015). "F Units, T to 9". Classic Trains. pp. 20–35. ISSN 1527-0718.
- Diesel Era (1994). The Revolutionary Diesel: EMC's FT. Halifax, PA, USA: Withers Publishing. ISBN 1-881411-02-8.
- Lamb, J. Parker (2007). Evolution of the American Diesel Locomotive. Railroads Past and Present. Bloomington, Indiana: Indiana University Press. ISBN 978-0-253-34863-0.
- Marre, Louis A. (1995). Diesel Locomotives: The First 50 Years: A Guide to Diesels Built Before 1972. Railroad Reference Series. Waukesha, Wisconsin: Kalmbach Publishing. ISBN 978-0-89024-258-2.
- Pinkepank, Jerry A. (1973). The Second Diesel Spotter's Guide. Milwaukee, Wisconsin: Kalmbach Publishing. ISBN 978-0-89024-026-7.
- Schafer, Mike (1998). Vintage Diesel Locomotives. Enthusiast Color Series. Osceola, Wisconsin: MBI Publishing. ISBN 978-0-7603-0507-2.
- Solomon, Brian (2000). The American Diesel Locomotive. Osceola, Wisconsin: MBI Publishing Company. ISBN 978-0-7603-0666-6.
- Solomon, Brian (2005). EMD F-Unit Locomotives. North Branch, Minnesota: Specialty Press. ISBN 978-1-58007-192-5.
- Solomon, Brian (2006). EMD Locomotives. St. Paul, Minnesota: Voyageur Press. ISBN 978-0-7603-2396-0.
- Solomon, Brian (2010). Vintage Diesel Power. Minneapolis, Minnesota: MBI Publishing. ISBN 978-0-7603-3795-0.
- Solomon, Brian (2011). Electro-Motive E-Units and F-Units: The Illustrated History of North America's Favorite Locomotives. Minneapolis, Minnesota: Voyageur Press. ISBN 978-0-7603-4007-3.
- Solomon, Brian (2012). North American Locomotives: A Railroad-by-Railroad Photohistory. Minneapolis, Minnesota: Voyageur Press. ISBN 978-0-7603-4370-8.
- Wilson, Jeff (1999). F Units: The Diesels That Did It. Golden Years of Railroading. Waukesha, Wisconsin: Kalmbach Publishing. ISBN 978-0-89024-374-9.
