= Vicey, Virginia =

Unincorporated community in Virginia, United States

Coordinates: 37°12′25″N 82°13′43″W

Vicey is an unincorporated community in Buchanan County, Virginia, United States.

== History ==
A post office called Visey operated in the 1890s. The community was named for a local woman, Vicey Clevinger.
