= EMD F7 =

Model of 1500 hp North American cab diesel locomotive

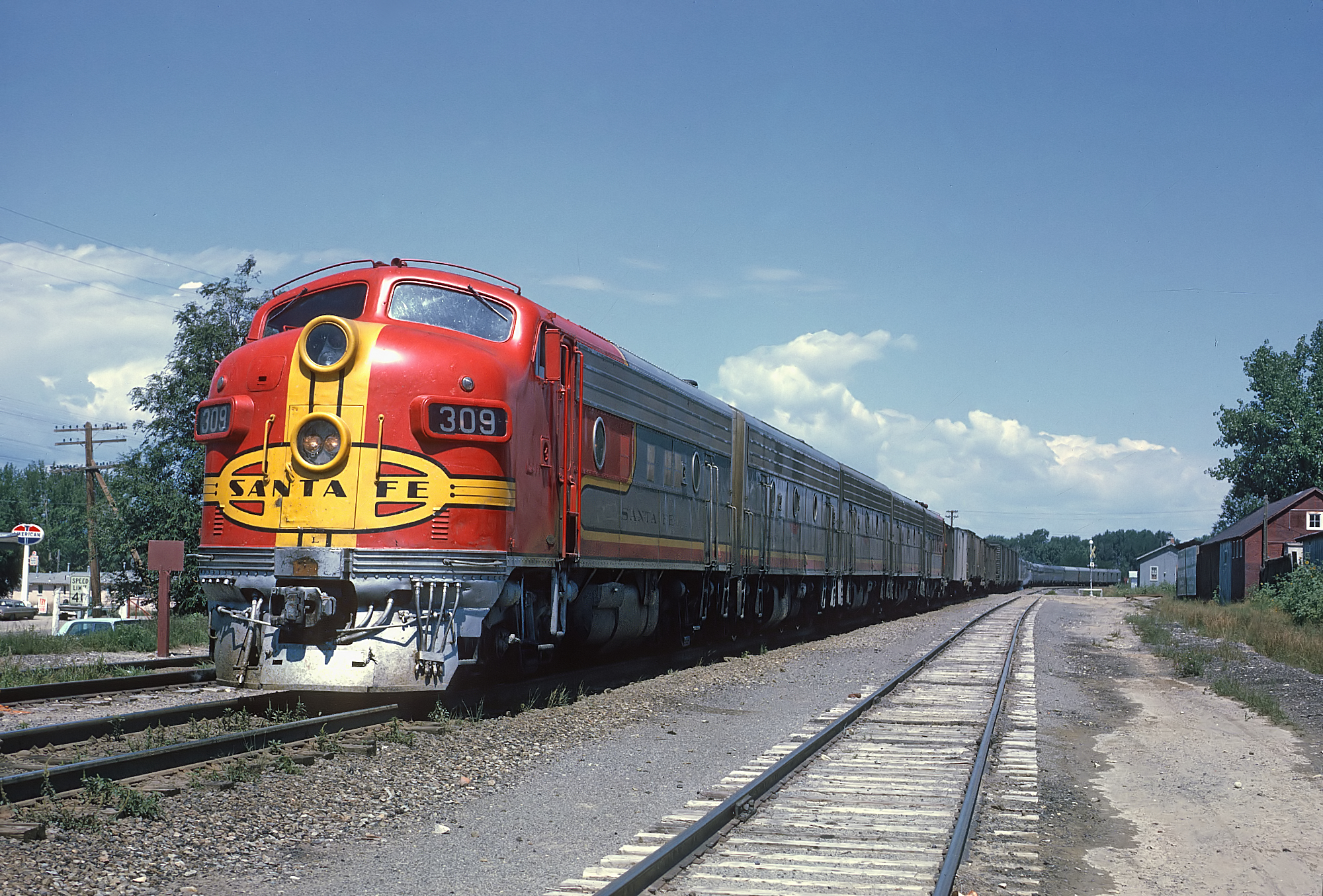
- Santa Fe Railway F7 #309 with the Grand Canyon Limited on August 19, 1967
Type and origin
- Power type: Diesel-electric
- Builder: General Motors Electro-Motive Division (EMD); General Motors Diesel (GMD, Canada)
- Model: F7
- Build date: February 1949 – December 1953
- Total produced: 2,393 A units; 1,463 B units
Specifications
- Configuration
  - AAR: B-B
  - UIC: Bo’Bo’
- Gauge: 4 ft 8 1/2 in (1,435 mm)
- Trucks: Blomberg B
- Wheel diameter: 40 in (1,016 mm)
- Minimum curve: 23° (250.79 ft or 76.44 m radius)
- Wheelbase: 39 ft (11.89 m)
- Length: A unit: 50 ft 8 in (15.44 m); B unit: 50 ft 0 in (15.24 m)
- Width: 10 ft 7 in (3.23 m)
- Height: 15 ft (4.57 m)
- Loco weight: 247,300 lb (112,200 kg)
- Prime mover: EMD 16-567B
- RPM range: 800
- Engine type: Two-stroke V16 diesel
- Aspiration: Roots blower
- Displacement: 9,072 cu in (148.66 L)
- Generator: EMD D-12
- Traction motors: (4) EMD D-27-B
- Cylinders: 16
- Cylinder size: 8 1/2 in × 10 in (216 mm × 254 mm)
Performance figures
- Maximum speed: 65–102 mph (105–164 km/h)
- Power output: 1,500 hp (1,100 kW)
- Tractive effort: Starting: 56,500 lbf (251 kN) at 25% Continuous: 40,000 lbf (180 kN) at 9.3 mph (15 km/h)
Career
- Locale: North America
- Disposition: several preserved

The EMD F7 is a model of 1,500-horsepower (1,100 kW) diesel-electric locomotive produced between February 1949 and December 1953 by the Electro-Motive Division of General Motors (EMD) and General Motors Diesel (GMD).

Although originally promoted by EMD as a freight-hauling unit, the F-series, including the F7 were also capable of passenger service, and used in hauling trains such as the Santa Fe Railway's high-speed flagship trains, the Super Chief, & El Capitan, and the Ontario Northland's Northlander.

== History ==
The F7 was the fourth model in GM-EMD's successful line of F-unit locomotives, and by far the best-selling cab unit of all time. In fact, more F7s were built than all other F-units combined. The F7 succeeded the F3 model in GM-EMD's F-unit series, and was replaced in turn by the F9. Final assembly was at GM-EMD's La Grange, Illinois, plant or GMD's London, Ontario, facility. There was no F4, -5 or -6 model; "7" was chosen to match the contemporary twin-engine E7, and was also applied to the new GP7 road-switcher.

The F7 differed from the F3 primarily in internal equipment—mostly electrical—and some external features. Its continuous tractive effort rating was 20 percent higher, e.g. 40,000 lbf (180 kN) for an F7 with 65 mph (105 km/h) gearing, compared to 32,500 lbf (145 kN) for an F3 with the same gearing.

Many F7s remained in service for decades, as railroads found them economical to operate and maintain. However, the locomotive was not very popular with yard crews who operated them in switching service because they were difficult to mount and dismount, and it was also nearly impossible for the engineer to see hand signals from a ground crew without leaning way outside the window. As most of these engines were bought and operated before two-way radio became standard on most American railroads, this was a major point of contention. In later years, with the advent of the "road switchers" such as the EMD GP7, F-units were primarily used in "through freight" and "unit train" service where there was little or no switching to be done.

== Engine and powertrain ==
The F7's prime mover is a 16-cylinder 567B series diesel engine developing 1,500 hp (1.1 MW) at 800 rpm. The 567B is a mechanically aspirated two-stroke design in a 45-degree V engine configuration, with 567 cu in (9.29 L) displacement per cylinder, for a total of 9,072 cu in (148.66 L). A direct current generator that is mechanically coupled to the flywheel end of the engine powers four traction motors, with two motors mounted on each Blomberg B truck. EMD has built all of its major components since 1939.

== Identification ==
There are no easily identifiable differences between late F3 production and early F7 production; the major differences were all internal electrical system changes. However, no F7 had the "chicken wire" grilles seen on most F3s, and no F3s had later F7 changes described below under Phases.

The F9 is distinguishable from the late F7 by having five, rather than four, carbody center louver groups covering the carbody filters. The additional one is placed ahead of the first porthole, where F7s have no openings. The F9's greater power output, of course, cannot be seen from the outside.

There were also two main classes of F7s: passenger and freight. Most passenger units had upper and lower headlights, but there were exceptions. Many freight units had the upper Mars or Pyle brand warning light as well. And some passenger units only had a single upper headlight, i.e. the Pennsylvania. Many units eventually had the upper lights or the door light removed/plated over and the Mars/Pyle light removed. These early warning lights had a motor and linkages that often required maintenance in the shops.

== Rebuilds ==
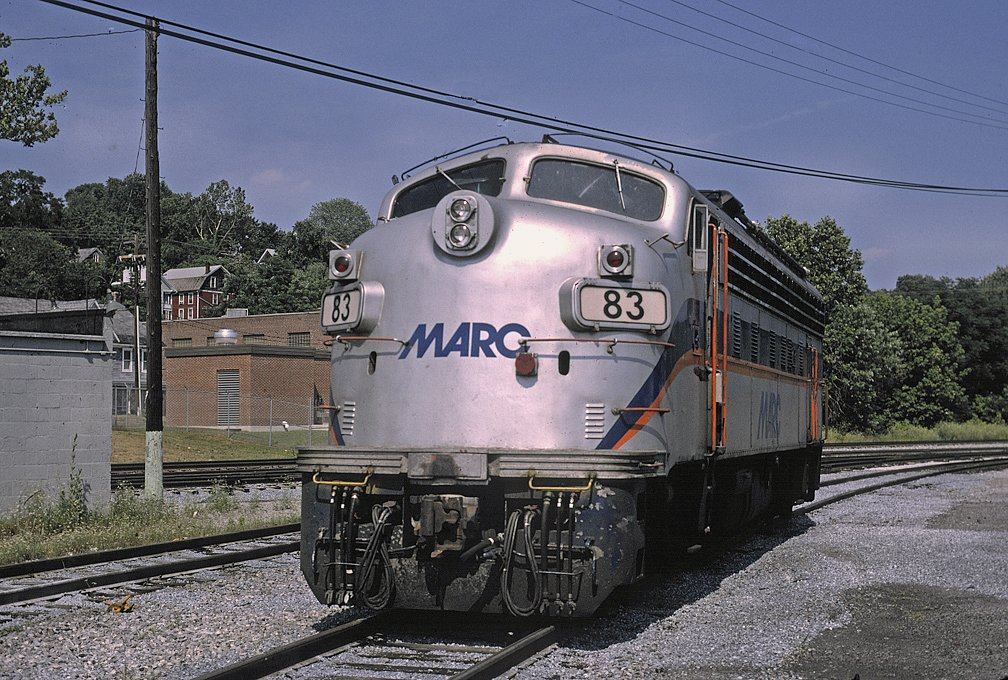
MARC Train #83, a former B&O F7 rebuilt into an F9PH, at Brunswick, Maryland in 1994.

Several F7s were rebuilt by Morrison–Knudsen as F9PHs and used in passenger operations. Another was rebuilt as the "FP10" and used by the Massachusetts Bay Transportation Authority for their commuter rail service. In addition, the Santa Fe had 190 of their F7As rebuilt into CF7 hood units in the 1970s. Only one original F7 unit from the railway exists to this day, preserved in running condition at the California State Railroad Museum in Sacramento.

In the early 2000s, a single unpowered EMD F cab unit #7100 (ex-Baltimore & Ohio Railroad F7 #4553) operated on MARC, occasionally serving as a substitute cab car. In addition to serving as an all-purpose control unit, it also had a head-end power generator that supplied electricity to the train.

== Licensees ==
Locomotives based on the F7 design were built by licensees in Europe and Australia.

== Original owners ==
A total of 2,393 cab-equipped lead A units and 1,463 cabless-booster or B units were built. Roughly fifty railroads purchased A units, B units, or both. The single largest buyer was the Southern Pacific Railroad, which purchased 294 A units and 236 B units. Other significant buyers included the Atchison, Topeka and Santa Fe Railway, the New York Central Railroad, the Baltimore and Ohio Railroad, and the Pennsylvania Railroad. Locomotives intended for use in Canada were built by General Motors Diesel, EMD's Canadian subsidiary. These included 76 for the Canadian National Railway and 29 for the Canadian Pacific Railway. The Wabash Railroad, although primarily an American railroad, purchased locomotives from both EMD and GMD. The Ferrocarriles Nacionales de México's (NdeM) 39 locomotives were built in the United States.

== Surviving units ==
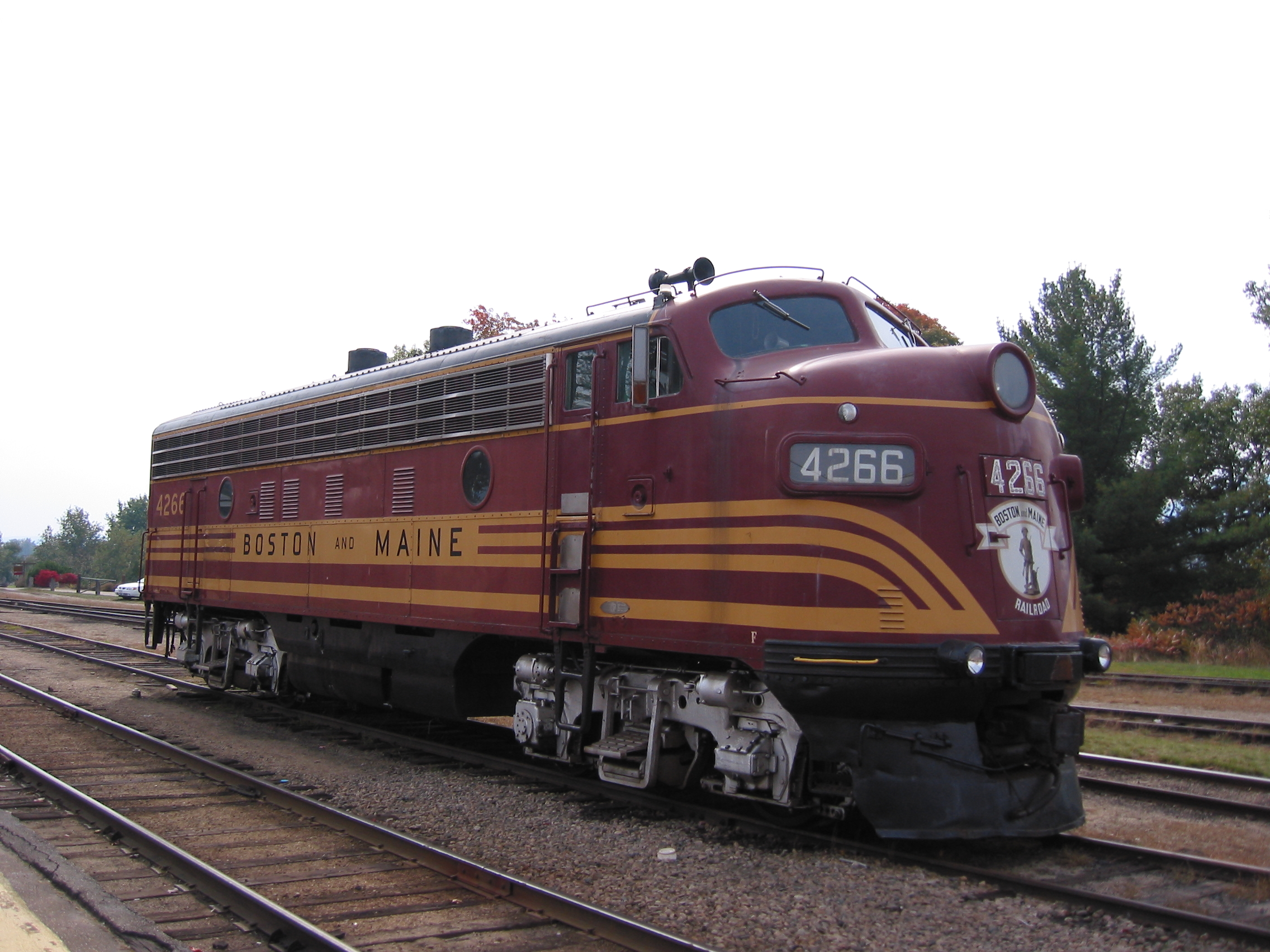
Boston & Maine 4266 at the Conway Scenic Railroad in North Conway, N.H., seen on October 9, 2004.

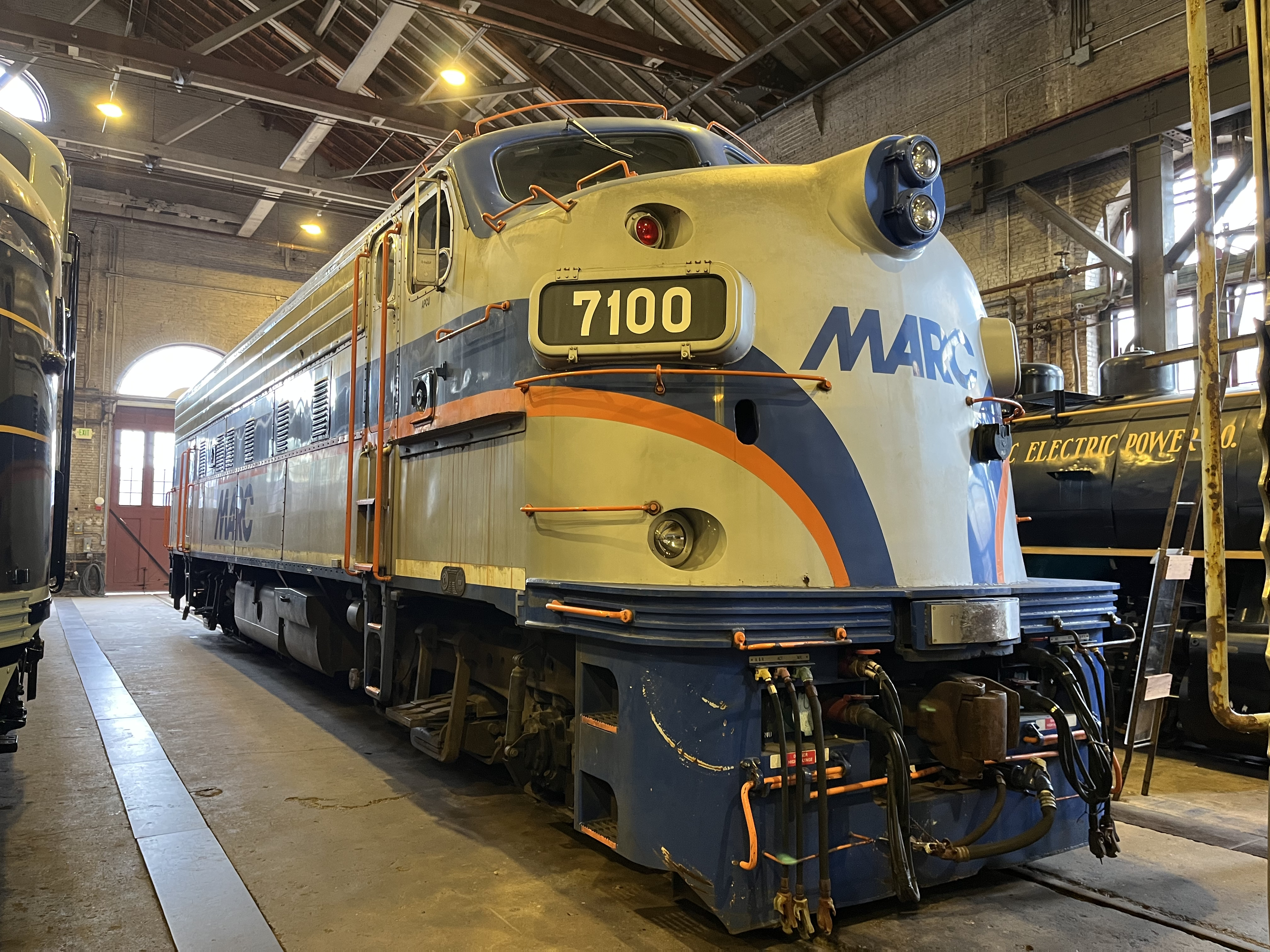
MARC APCU No. 7100 at the National Museum of Railroad History & Innovation

Several F7s are preserved at shortlines, tourist lines, and museums, including:

- Aberdeen, Carolina and Western Railway
- Boone and Scenic Valley Railroad
- California State Railroad Museum
- Conway Scenic Railroad
- Don Rhodes Mining and Transport Museum
- Galveston Railroad Museum
- Illinois Railway Museum
- Manitoba Children's Museum
- Museum of Alaska Transportation & Industry
- National Museum of Railroad History & Innovation, Baltimore, Maryland
- Oregon Coast Scenic Railroad
- Reading Blue Mountain and Northern Railroad
- Toronto Railway Museum has the cab of ex-Canadian National Railway F7A 9159 - built 1951 and scrapped 1991; cab acquired by TRM in 2006.

== See also ==
- EMD FP7
- NOHAB
- List of GM-EMD locomotives
- List of GMD Locomotives
