= Cab unit =

Body styles of locomotive

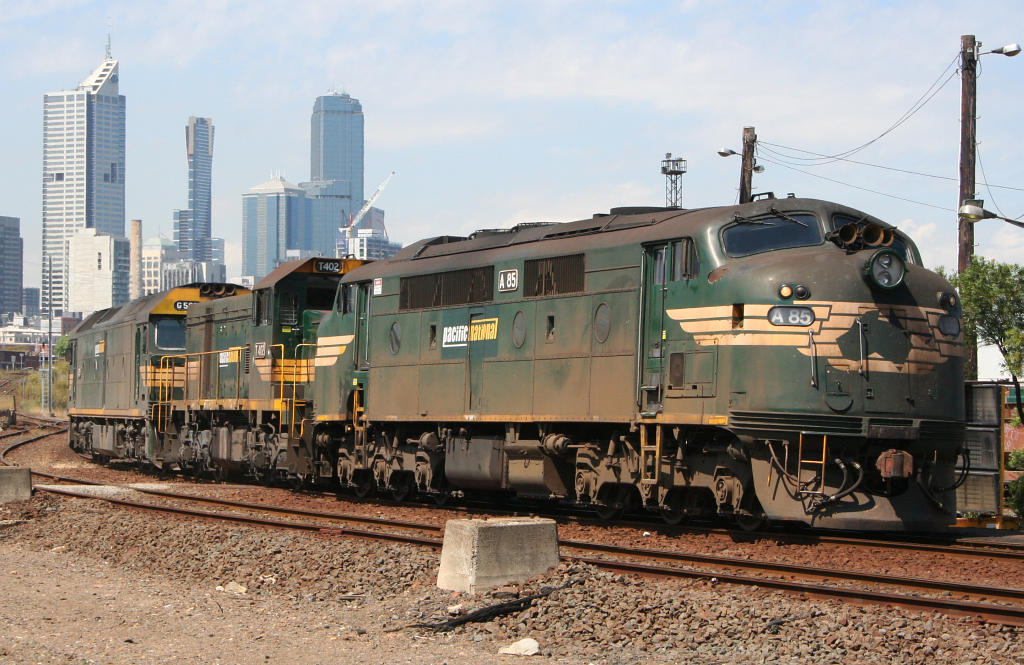
Three body styles of diesel locomotive: cab unit (front), hood unit, and flat-nose (rear). These locomotives are operated by Pacific National in Australia.

In North American railroad terminology, a cab unit is a railroad locomotive with its own cab and controls.

"Carbody unit" is a related term, which may be either a cabless booster unit controlled from a linked cab unit, or a cab unit that contains its own controls.

== Characteristics ==
With both body styles, a bridge-truss design framework is used to make the body a structural element of the locomotive. The body extends the full width and length of the locomotive. The service walkways are inside the body.

Carbody units, gaining rigidity from the body trusswork, require less structural weight to achieve rigidity than do locomotives with non-structural bodies. For that reason, carbody construction was favored to increase the power-to-weight ratio for early diesel locomotives, before the power available with diesel technology was increased. Recent years have seen carbody construction revived in the quest for greater fuel efficiency with passenger locomotives.

The full-width body gives a carbody cab unit poor rear visibility compared with a hood unit. For that reason, cab or carbody units are mostly used in situations where rear visibility is not important, such as power for through freight and passenger trains. Cab and carbody units are also more aerodynamic than hood units, and pulled many of the streamliner trains.

== A and B unit ==
A cab unit is a carbody unit with a driving cab (or crew compartment). Thus, a cab unit is also always an A unit (a locomotive with a cab). By contrast, a carbody unit can be either an A unit, or a B unit (a locomotive without a cab).

== Passenger-oriented cab units ==
- EMC TA
- EMC EA/EB
- EMC E1
- EMC E2
- EMC E3
- EMC E4
- EMD E5
- EMD E6
- EMD E7
- EMD E8
- EMD E9
- EMD FP7
- EMD FP9
- EMD FL9
- EMC AA
- EMC AB6
- ALCO DL-103b
- ALCO DL-105
- ALCO DL-107
- ALCO DL-108
- ALCO DL-109
- ALCO DL-110
- ALCO DL-202
- ALCO DL-203
- ALCO FPA/FPB-1
- ALCO FPA/FPB-2
- ALCO PA/PB-1
- ALCO PA/PB-2
- Baldwin 4-8+8-4-750/8-DE
- Baldwin DR-12-8-1500/2 ¨Centipede¨
- Baldwin DR-6-4-2000
- Baldwin DR-6-4-1500
- Baldwin DR-6-2-1000
- Baldwin DR-4-4-15
- Baldwin RF-16
- Baldwin RP-210
- Fairbanks-Morse Erie-Built
- Fairbanks-Morse CPA-20-5
- Fairbanks-Morse CPA-24-5

== Freight-oriented cab units ==
- EMD FT
- EMD F2
- EMD F3
- EMD F7
- EMD F9
- ALCO FA/FB-1
- ALCO FA/FB-2
- Fairbanks-Morse CFA/B-16-4
- Fairbanks-Morse CFA/B-20-4
- Ingalls 4-S

== Cowl unit ==
A cowl unit is an adaptation of the hood unit design with a full-width body. Despite some visual similarities, cowl units are actually very different from cab units. All structural support on a cowl unit is provided by the frame of the locomotive, rather than in the body as with a cab unit. This allows manufacturers to cheaply and easily create full-width locomotives from their hood unit designs by simply adding cowling. Cowl units were first introduced as a special order from the Santa Fe, which wanted a sleeker design for its passenger equipped hood units. Although the first cowl units (such as the EMD FP45 and the GE U30CG) were meant for passenger service, EMD would later offer freight-only derivatives starting with the F45.

== Great Britain ==
Cab units were not generally used in Great Britain. The traditional makers continued to use heavyweight frames and cowl units instead.

The LMS twins 10000 and 10001 used the design and later locomotive types such as the British Rail Class 37, and British Rail Class 40 utilised cab units but the term "cab unit" is not used in Britain. The Class 37 and Class 40, like most British diesel and electric locomotives, has a cab at each end.
