= EMC E1 =

Early American diesel-passenger locomotive

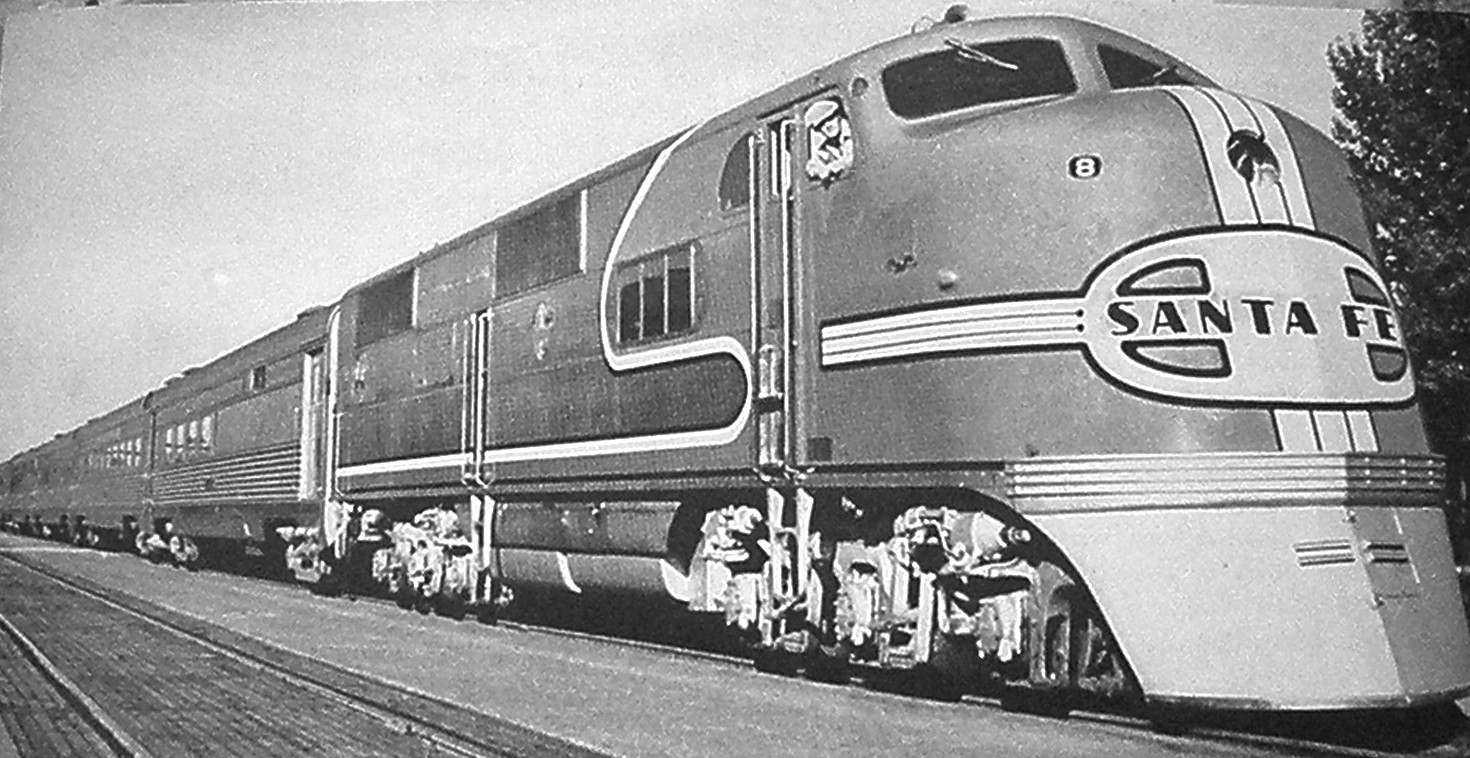
- A 1938 publicity photo of Santa Fe's Golden Gate passenger train pulled by ATSF E1 no. 8, which was used exclusively for Golden Gate service
Type and origin
- Power type: Diesel-electric
- Builder: Electro-Motive Corporation (EMC)
- Serial number: 662 (2) 791-797(3-9) 663 (2A) 798-799 (3-4A)
- Build date: June 1937–April 1938
- Total produced: 8 A units, 3 B units
Specifications
- Configuration
  - AAR: A1A-A1A
- Gauge: 4 ft 8 1/2 in (1,435 mm)
- Prime mover: Winton 201-A, 2 off
Performance figures
- Maximum speed: up to 116 mph (186.6 km/h)
- Power output: 1,800 hp (1,300 kW)
Career
- Operators: Atchison, Topeka and Santa Fe Railway
- Numbers: 2–9 (A units), 2A–4A (B units)
- Disposition: All scrapped

The EMC E1 was an early passenger-train diesel locomotive, developing 1,800 horsepower (1,300 kW), with an A1A-A1A wheel arrangement, and manufactured by Electro-Motive Corporation of La Grange, Illinois. They were built during 1937 and 1938 for the Atchison, Topeka and Santa Fe Railway for a new generation of diesel-powered streamlined trains. Eight cab-equipped lead A units and three cabless booster B units were built.

The initial three locomotives were AB pairs built to haul the Santa Fe's Super Chief diesel streamliners, while the others were built as single A units to haul shorter trains. The locomotives were diesel-electrics with two 900 hp (670 kW) Winton 201-A engines each, with each engine driving its own generator to power the traction motors. The E1 was the second model in a long line of passenger diesels of similar design known as EMD E-units. All Winton 201A-engined Santa Fe passenger units, including the E1s, were extensively rebuilt into the 80-class E8M engines in 1952–53. They were similar to production E8 models, but derated to 2,000 hp (1,500 kW) so as not to burn out the early traction (axle) motors, which were reused.

== Significance and influence ==
The E1—along with the more-or-less simultaneous EA/EB for the Baltimore and Ohio Railroad, the E2 for the Union Pacific Railroad, Chicago and North Western Railway and Southern Pacific Railroad, and the TA for the Chicago, Rock Island and Pacific Railroad—represented an important step in the evolution of the passenger diesel locomotive. While the EA, E1, E2 and TA were each built for a specific railroad, they were largely identical mechanically (though the TA used a single Winton 201-A diesel of sixteen cylinders, and produced only 1,200 hp (890 kW), and were a step further away from the custom-built, integrated streamliner and towards mass-produced passenger locomotives—a step achieved with the E3, EMD's next model.

== Styling ==
The EA/EB and E1 featured largely identical and innovative styling showing the influence of the Electro-Motive Corporation's new owner General Motors. While mechanically they had much in common with previous, experimental EMC locomotives, GM understood the importance of looking new and exciting, not merely being technically innovative. This basic "slant nose" style was continued in the subsequent E3, E4, E5 and E6 models, while a more "bulldog nose" style was tried in the E2 and a style somewhere in between was used for the E7, E8 and E9, as well as the freight diesel cab units.

It could fairly be said that the overall styling influenced passenger locomotives around the world. The "shovelnose" styling was modified on later models because the streamlined headlight was found less satisfactory than more common types with vertical lenses, and the elegantly sloped nose had a bad habit of deflecting vehicles up toward the cab in a grade crossing collision. More enduring was the paint scheme—E1 number two and her booster #2A were the first locomotives to wear the world-famous Santa Fe "Warbonnet" red and silver colors. In fact, these units used stainless steel sides on the car body to better match the road's new stainless passenger cars. This decor was not developed by the Santa Fe, but by EMC—or rather, by GM's Art and Color section.

== Numbers and assignments ==
Each E1 was initially ordered for and assigned to a particular train. The ATSF practice was to give all locomotive units in a set the same number, distinguished by letter. The lead unit was designated 'L', but this was not carried on its number boards. The second unit was 'A'; subsequent units were 'B', 'C', if present. This numbering was part of the railroad's ultimately successful campaign to convince the railroad unions that a multiple-unit diesel locomotive should be considered one locomotive of several parts (and thus needing only one crew) rather than multiple locomotives requiring multiple crews under union agreements.

- 2 and 2A - for the original streamlined Super Chief.
- 3 and 3A - for the second streamlined Super Chief trainset.
- 4 and 4A - "protection" (backup) power for the Super Chief.
- 5 - for the El Capitan.
- 6 - for the El Capitan.
- 7 - for the San Diegan.
- 8 - for the Golden Gate.
- 9 - for the Golden Gate.

About a month before inaugurating Golden Gate service, units 8 and 9 inaugurated the Chicagoan/Kansas Cityan streamlined coach trains. After the publicity photos and promotional runs had been done with these units, these services were taken over by a mechanically similar, heavily rebuilt numbers 1 and 10 (the latter being the former 1A) of 1935. Soon, additional equipment from the Budd Company allowed the Santa Fe to enlarge the wildly successful El Capitan beyond the original pair of five car consists. The 4/4A set, which originally sat around "protecting" the Super Chief, was pressed into regular service, and units five and six were combined to form one lashup. This provided four 3,600 hp (2,700 kW) lashups to serve the four trainsets in transcontinental service, providing twice-weekly service for both trains.

With the delivery of EMC E3, E6 and ALCO DL-107 and DL-108 units in 1940–41, the E1 units were less often used on the Super Chief and El Capitan. Instead they doubled up on the other trains as their consists were expanded, and occasionally handled the normally steam-powered Chief. In 1947, all the Santa Fe's E1 locomotives were pulled from transcontinental service, and used on a variety of other services where the grades were not as severe. Those units, and the similarly powered 1 and 1A, were rebuilt by EMD as E8M locomotives, eliminating the unreliable 201-A diesels. The first few units rebuilt retained their original numbers for a time, but as unit 1 was rebuilt as a booster, the group was renumbered 80-87 (cab units) and 80A-84A (boosters). Unit 3, as unit 82, was destroyed in a wreck near Hardin, Missouri in August 1959 and scrapped. The other units were sold in 1971.

None survived into preservation.

== See also ==
- List of GM-EMD locomotives
- List of GMD Locomotives
