= EMC E2 =

American passenger-train diesel locomotive

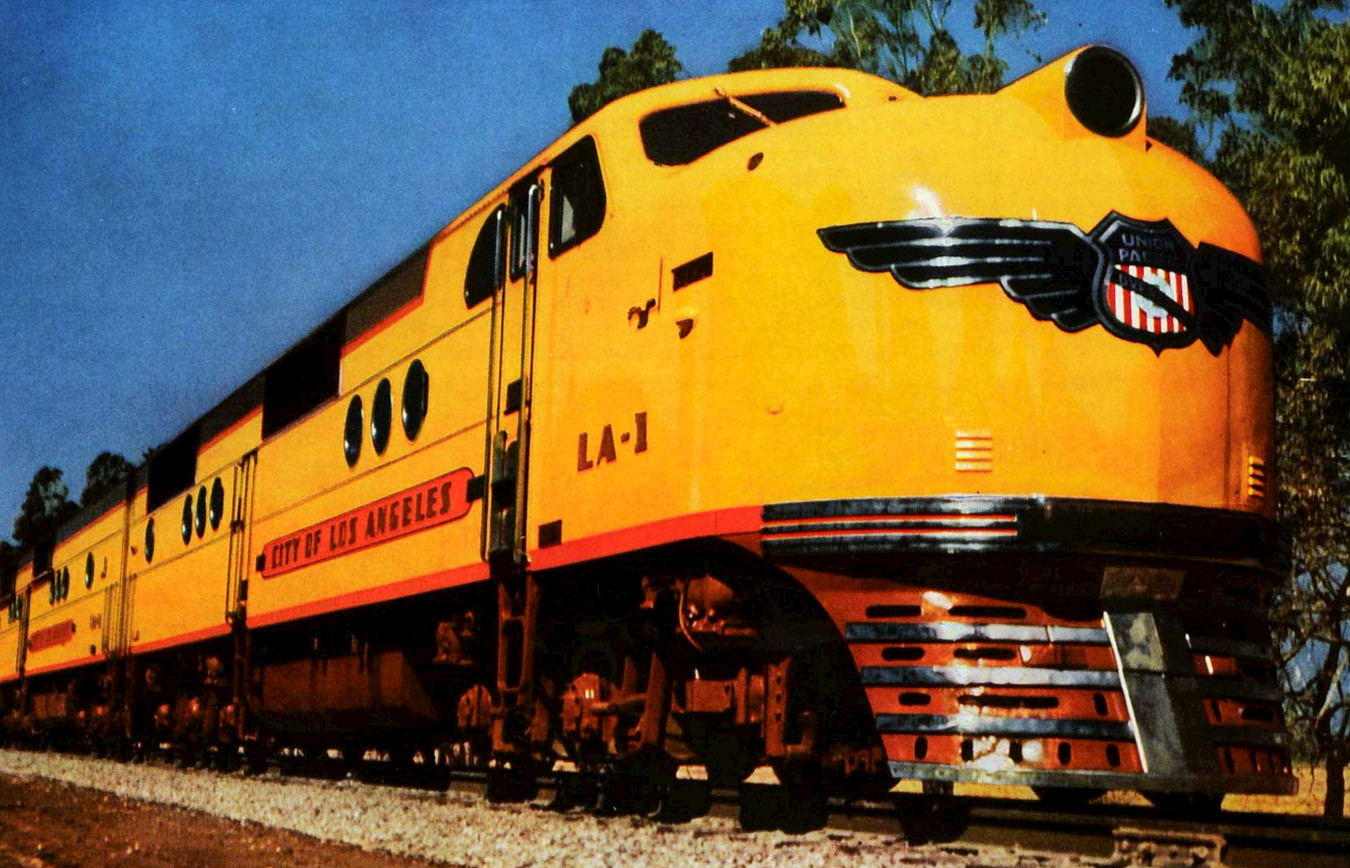
- UP E2 LA-1 on an advertisement in 1944
Type and origin
- Power type: Diesel-electric
- Builder: Electro-Motive Corporation (EMC)
- Serial number: 741 (LA-1) 742-743 (LA-2 & 3) 744 (SF-1) 745-746 (SF-2 & 3)
- Build date: October 1937-December 1937
- Total produced: 2 ABB sets
Specifications
- Configuration
  - AAR: A1A-A1A
- Gauge: 4 ft 8 1/2 in (1,435 mm)
- Prime mover: Winton 201-A, 2 off
Performance figures
- Power output: 1,800 hp (1,340 kW) total
Career
- Operators: Union Pacific Railroad, Chicago and North Western Railway, Southern Pacific Railroad
- Disposition: All scrapped.

The EMC E2 was an American passenger-train diesel locomotive which as a single unit developed 1,800 horsepower (1,300 kW), from two (2) 900 horsepower (670 kW) prime movers. These locomotives were typically operated as a unit set (A - B - B) or (A - B - A); where the three unit lashup developed 5400 horsepower. This was almost the ideal horsepower required (6,000 horsepower or 4,500 kilowatts) for the tonnage of a 15 - 18 car passenger train, operated over the ruling grades of virtually all of the mileage between major American cities. The units were of the A1A-A1A wheel arrangement, and manufactured by Electro-Motive Corporation (EMC), later Electro-Motive Diesel (EMD) of La Grange, Illinois.

Two sets (each of three units, A-B-B) (5,400 horsepower or 4,000 kilowatts) were produced in 1937 for named passenger trains; the first set (SF-1, SF-2, and SF-3) for the City of San Francisco. These motive-power sets were jointly owned and operated by the Union Pacific Railroad, the Chicago and North Western Railway, and the Southern Pacific Railroad. The second A-B-B set (LA-1, LA-2, and LA-3) was used for the City of Los Angeles; and, was jointly owned and operated by the UP and CNW only. The first locomotive power unit was the control cab, or "A" unit, while the other two were cabless boosters, or "B" units. The control cab and booster units were designed for multiple unit operation (the first in diesel motive power). A single engine crew in the cab, remotely monitored and controlled all three motive power units from a single control station in the cab. The locomotives were diesel-electrics with two 900 hp Winton 201-A engines each, with each engine driving its own generator to power the traction motors. In addition the locomotives contained steam generators for passenger car heating. An independent auxiliary diesel powered electric generator was housed in the first car of the train consist. This car was a combination power/baggage/post office, or crew dormitory. This car provided electric power for train-line "hotel" power for their named train set(s), to include the air conditioning, dining, lounge, and entertainment. The power cars were required for these train sets because of the electrical demand of their feature cars. The E2 was the third model in a long line of passenger diesels of similar design known as EMD E-units.

The E2, along with the more-or-less simultaneous EA/EB units for the Baltimore and Ohio Railroad and the E1 units for the Atchison, Topeka and Santa Fe Railway, represented an important step in the evolution of the passenger diesel locomotive. While the EA, E1 and E2 were each built for a specific railroad and train, they were largely identical mechanically and were a step further away from the concept of custom-built motive power, integrated into a particular streamliner; and towards mass-produced standardized locomotives. This transition was achieved with the E3, E4, E5, and E6, EMC (later EMD)'s next models.

== Styling ==
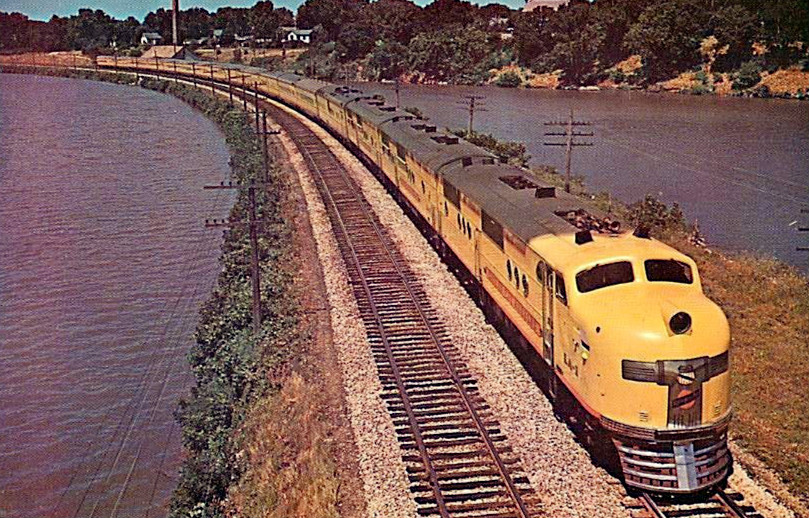
City of Los Angeles, with EMC E2 locomotive featuring its aggressive bulldog nose, 1941 paint scheme

The E2's profile was more aggressive than the sloping snouts of previous EMC passenger power, so they gained a "bulldog nose" nickname. Subsequent blunt-snouted passenger units are sometimes also called this, but the E2's nose is by far the most bulbous among the E and F series locomotives. The seven porthole windows on the sides were one less than its predecessors in Union Pacific's diesel streamliner fleet, the M-10003 to M-10006. One of the nicknames that these locomotives acquired, because of these portholes and prominent nose, was "Queen Mary," after the British Cunard liner had recently been put in service. The Union Pacific Railroad also referred to the schedule of the "City of San Francisco," a passenger train hauled by these locomotives, as sailings. Later E units for Union Pacific, including E7 locomotives, were ordered modified with extra porthole style windows. The units were painted in Union Pacific's Armour Yellow with Leaf Brown roofs and undersides, the same colors as UP's previous streamliners (the M-10000 etc.). Color photographs indicate that UP modified their color scheme with slate gray roofs around mid-1941. There was extensive stainless steel on the noses, upon which were displayed the owning railroads' heralds in color. The bulbous nose and stainless steel ornamentation of the E2 evoked the nose design of the UP's M-10003 to M-10006 streamliner locomotives, which were also bulbous, featuring a large stainless steel grille and pilot ornamentation. UP's advertising from that era often had renditions of their locomotives emphasizing their bulbous and shiny noses.

== Replacement ==
All four "B" units (SF-2, SF-3, LA-2, LA-3) went to the Union Pacific; they were used until 1953, when they were "rebuilt" into E8 locomotives. These rebuilds utilised little of the previous locomotives and were effectively trade-ins. The driving "A" unit of the SF set, SF-1, (the "Queen Mary") went to the Southern Pacific; it was likewise "rebuilt" into EMD E7 #6017. The "A" unit of the LA set, LA-1, went to the Chicago and North Western (#5003A) and was scrapped in 1953 after it was destroyed in a head-on collision near Rhinelander, Wisconsin.

No E2 survives today. However the pair of Winton Model 201A V12 diesel engines from SF-1 (the lead unit of the City of San Francisco set, nicknamed "Queen Mary") were rescued from scrap and eventually became part of the collection of artifacts at the California State Railroad Museum at Sacramento. One of the engines has now (September 2009) been transferred to the Illinois Railway Museum at Union, Illinois.

== See also ==
- List of GM-EMD locomotives
