= ALCO PA =

American locomotive class

ALCO PA1/PB1 PA2/PB2
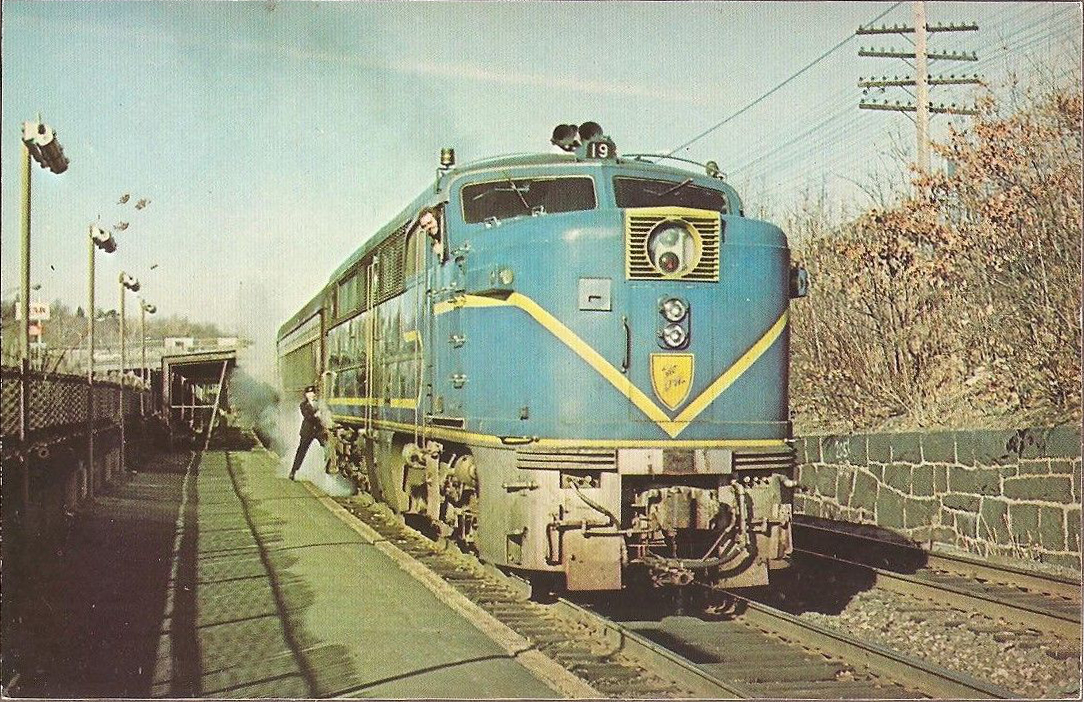
- An ALCO/M-K PA-4 of the Delaware and Hudson Railroad in April 1978
Type and origin
- Power type: Diesel-electric
- Builder: Partnership of American Locomotive Company (ALCO) and General Electric (GE)
- Model: PA1, PB1, PA2, PB2
- Build date: June 1946 – December 1953
- Total produced: 297
Specifications
- Configuration
  - AAR: A1A-A1A
- Gauge: 4 ft 8 1/2 in (1,435 mm) standard gauge 1,600 mm (5 ft 3 in), Brazil
- Length: 65 ft 8 in (20.02 m)
- Loco weight: 306,000 lb (138,799 kg; 139 t)
- Fuel type: Diesel
- Prime mover: ALCO 16-244G V16
- Engine type: V16 Four-stroke diesel
- Aspiration: Turbocharger
- Displacement: 10,688 cu in (175.14 L)
- Generator: DC
- Traction motors: 4x GE 746 or 752 DC traction motors
- Cylinders: 16
- Cylinder size: 9 in × 10 1/2 in (229 mm × 267 mm)
- Transmission: Diesel-electric
- MU working: Yes
- Loco brake: Independent air. Optional: Dynamic
- Train brakes: Air
Performance figures
- Maximum speed: 117 mph (188 km/h)
- Power output: 2,000 hp (1,490 kW) — PA-1/PB-1; 2,250 hp (1,680 kW) — PA-2/PB-2
- Tractive effort: 51,000 lbf (226.86 kN)
Career
- Class: Erie- PA1- PA-20 PA2- PA-22 NH- PA1- DER-3a NYC- PA1- various PB1- various PA2- DPA-4a PRR- PA1- AP20 P&LE- PA1- DPA-2c PA2- DPA-14b WAB- PA1- D20
- Locale: North America, Brazil
- Disposition: Three preserved, one operational, one under cosmetic restoration, one converted to steam generator car, remainder scrapped.

The ALCO PA was a family of A1A-A1A diesel locomotives built to haul passenger trains. The locomotives were built in Schenectady, New York, in the United States, by a partnership of the American Locomotive Company (ALCO) and General Electric (GE) between June, 1946 and December, 1953. Designed by General Electric's Ray Patten (along with their ALCO FA cousins), they were of a cab unit design; both cab-equipped lead A unit PA and cabless booster B unit PB models were built. While externally the PB models were slightly shorter than the PA model, they shared many of the same characteristics, both aesthetically and mechanically. However, they were not as reliable as EMD E-units.

ALCO's designation of P indicates that they were geared for higher speeds and passenger use, whereas the F designation marks these locomotives as being geared primarily for freight use. However, beyond this, their design was largely similar - aside from the PA/PB's both being larger A1A-A1A types with an even more striking nose - and many railroads used PA and FA locomotives for both freight and passenger service.

Although the majority of the PAs and PBs have been scrapped, six examples have survived. Four PAs are now preserved in railroad museums, while one PA has been restored to operational condition by Delaware-Lackawanna for use on excursion trains and a converted PB still remains in service as a power car.

== Service history ==
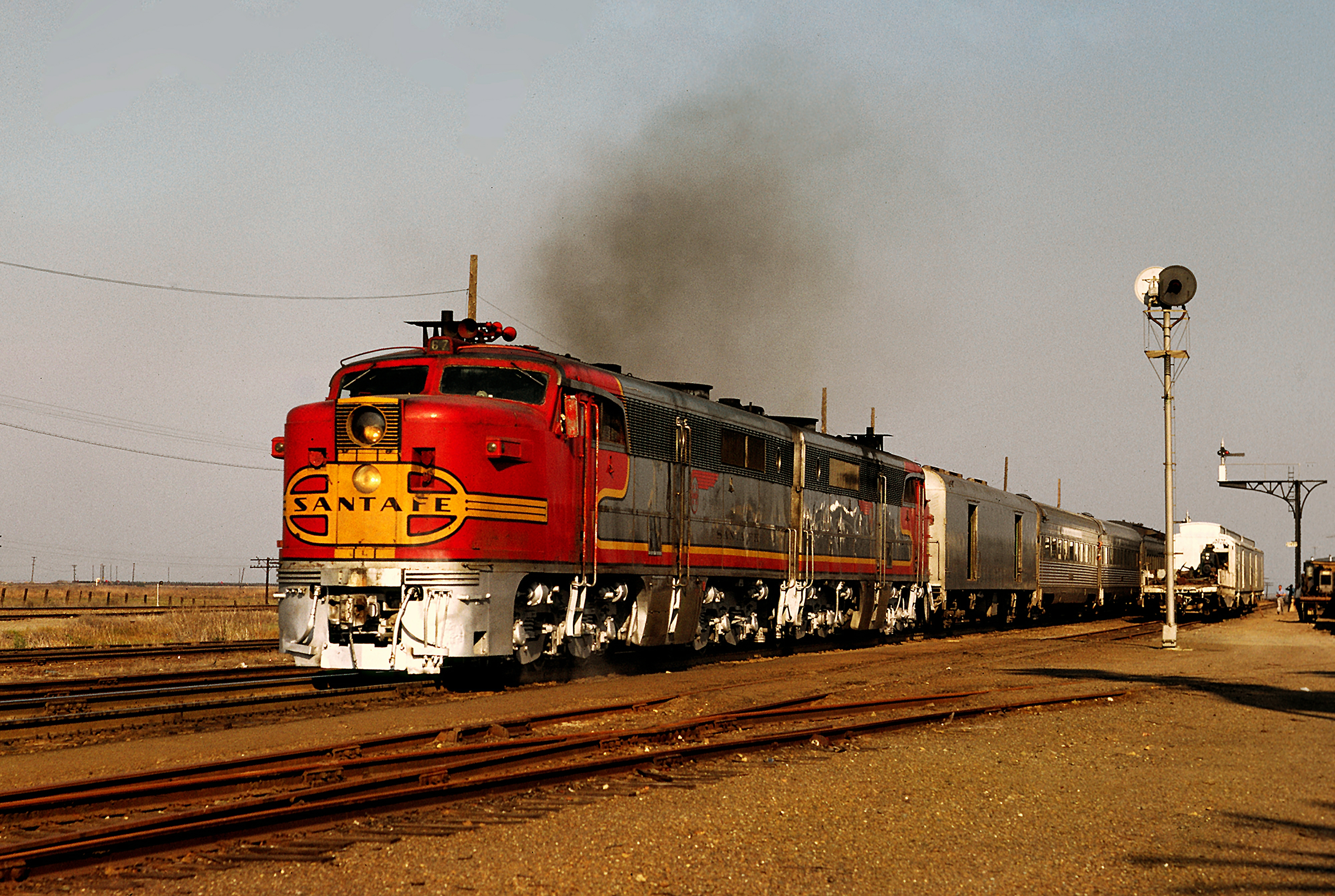
A pair of ALCO PA-1s of the Santa Fe Railway in March 1968

There were two models of PAs: the 2,000 horsepower (1,500 kW) PA-1/PB-1, which was built between September 1946 and June 1950, and the 2,250 horsepower (1,680 kW) PA-2/PB-2, which was built between April, 1950 and December, 1953.

The PAs, as well as their cousins, the ALCO FAs, were born as a result of ALCO's development of a new diesel engine design, the Model 244. In early 1944, development started on the new design, and by November 1945 the first engines were beginning to undergo tests. This unusually-short testing sequence was brought about by the decision of ALCO's senior management that the engine and an associated line of road locomotives had to be introduced no later than the end of 1946.

In preparation for this deadline, by January, 1946, the first 16-cylinder 244 engines were being tested, and, while a strike delayed work on the locomotives, the first two PA units were released for road tests in June, 1946 for testing for one month on the Lehigh Valley Railroad. After these first tests were completed, the locomotives returned to the factory for refurbishment and engine replacement.

In September, 1946, the first production units, an A-B-A set of PA1s in Santa Fe colors, numbered #51L, 51A and 51B, were released from the factory and sent to New York's Waldorf-Astoria Hotel, which had a private railroad siding, Track 61, for exhibition before being launched into road service. This set was repowered in August, 1954 with EMD 16-567C engines rated at 1,750 hp (1,300 kW). This EMD repowering of the PAs was economically unfeasible, and the remaining Santa Fe PAs retained their 244 engines.

Four PA-1s previously operated by the Santa Fe were sold to Delaware and Hudson Railway in 1967. In 1974-1975, they were rebuilt for the D&H as PA-4s by Morrison Knudsen and equipped with ALCO's 251 V-12 engines. Under D&H ownership, they were used by Amtrak for the Adirondack. (Amtrak itself only purchased EMD E- and F-units from the railroads whose service it replaced for its diesel roster, and never owned any PAs.) They were used by the Massachusetts Bay Transportation Authority in the late 1970s, then by Ferrocarriles Nacionales de México in 1978–81.

Fans deemed the PA one of the most beautiful diesels and an "Honorary Steam Locomotive", as noted by Professor George W. Hilton in a book review in September, 1968 Trains Magazine. When accelerating, until the turbocharger came up to speed, thick clouds of black smoke would pour from the exhaust stacks due to turbo lag. Photographing a moving PA while smoking became a prime objective of railfans.

== Original owners ==
Image	Railroad	PA1	PB1	PA2	PB2	PA1 road numbers	PB1 road numbers	PA2 road numbers	PB2 road numbers	Notes
	ALCO-GE Demonstrators			1	1			8375	8375B	to New York Central Railroad 4212 and 4304
	ALCO-GE Demonstrators	2				9077-9078				Demonstrated on Canadian National, painted in CN green and gold, later to Missouri-Kansas-Texas Railroad as PA-2s 59A, C. Last PA-1s built.
	American Freedom Train (original)	1				1776				First production PA1. To Gulf, Mobile and Ohio Railroad 292
	Atchison, Topeka & Santa Fe Railroad	28	16			51-62L, B, 70-73L	51-62A, 70-73A			Four PA1s sold to Delaware & Hudson in 1967; became last to operate in U.S.
	Denver & Rio Grande Western Railroad	4	2			6001, 6003, 6011, 6013	6002, 6012			
	Erie Railroad	12		2		850-861		862-863		
	Gulf, Mobile & Ohio Railroad	2				290-291				
	Lehigh Valley Railroad	14				601-614				
	Missouri-Kansas-Texas Railroad	4		8		57-58A, C		60-63A, C		59A, C were Alco PA-1 demonstrators rebuilt as PA-2s
	Missouri Pacific Railroad	8		28		8001-8008		8009-8036		8011-8012 were originally owned by International & Great Northern
	New York, New Haven and Hartford Railroad	27				0760-0786				Unit 0783 to D&H in 1967 for parts.
	New York, Chicago and St. Louis Railroad (Nickel Plate Road)	11				180-190				
	New York Central Railroad	4	4	4		4200-4203	4300-4303	4208-4211		
	Pennsylvania Railroad	10	5			5750-5759	5750B/5758B even #s			
	Pittsburgh and Lake Erie	4		2		4204-4207		4213-4214		
	St. Louis Southwestern Railway	2				300-301				To Southern Pacific Railroad 6067-6068
	Southern Pacific Railroad (T&NO)	12				200-205A, B				Renumbered to 200-211, then to Southern Pacific 6055-6066
	Southern Pacific Railroad	12	6	27	7	6005-6010A, C	6005-6010B	6019-6045	5918-5924	6005-6010A, C renumbered to 6005-6016, 6005-6010B renumbered to 5910-5915
	Southern Railway (CNO&TP)			6				6900-6905		Last PA's built by ALCO
	Union Pacific Railroad	8	6			600-607	600B, 602B, 604B-607B			607 converted for experimental coal-burning turbine in 1962
	Wabash Railroad	4				1050-1053				
	Companhia Paulista de Estradas de Ferro			3				600-602		1,600 mm (5 ft 3 in) gauge
	Totals	169	39	81	8					

=== Foreign sales ===
The PA-2 units sold to the 1,600 mm (5 ft 3 in) broad gauge Companhia Paulista de Estradas de Ferro of São Paulo State in Brazil were equipped with a bar pilot and solid horizontal steel pilot beam. One of these locomotives survives in a very bad conditions, a 1953 Alco PA2 Museum Train Jundiaí.

== Surviving examples ==
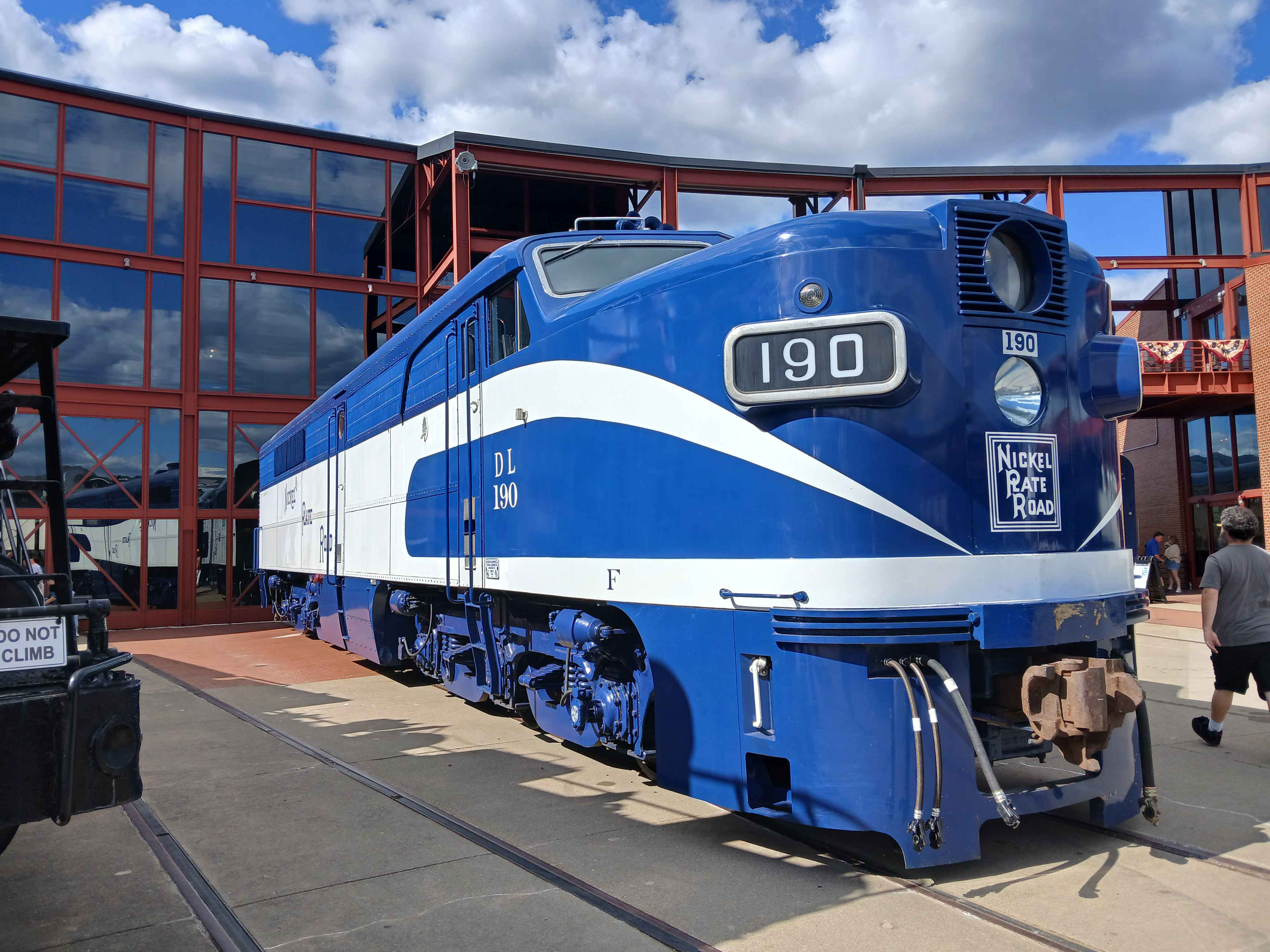
Nickel Plate Road 190 on display at Steamtown National Historic Site in 2025

Five PA units and one converted PB unit survive.

- One surviving unit, #600, is from the order of three broad gauge units sold to Companhia Paulista de Estradas de Ferro in Brazil. It exists at the Companhia Paulista Museum at Jundiai, São Paulo as a shell with no prime mover and no side panels. A restoration began in 2001 but has not been completed.
- All four Delaware & Hudson-operated PA-4s have survived, with two being in the United States, and the other two in Mexico.
  - From 1981 to 2000, No.16 and No.18 remained stored in Empalme, Sonora, Mexico. In 2000, the Smithsonian Institution and rail preservationist Doyle McCormack obtained the units and brought them back to the United States.
    - No.16, which was heavily damaged in a derailment while in Mexico, was planned to be cosmetically restored into its original "Warbonnet" colors for the Smithsonian Institution. The unit was acquired by the Museum of the American Railroad in 2011 and transported to the museum's new site in Frisco, Texas. Since then, it has been under restoration, with plans to return it to its original Warbonnet appearance and original number of ATSF 59L.
    - No.18 was owned by Doyle McCormack. It has been restored as Nickel Plate Road 190, a recreation of the first locomotive McCormack got to ride. The locomotive was moved to the Oregon Rail Heritage Center, in Portland, Oregon in 2012, where restoration work continued to take place. In March 2023, it was announced that the Genesee Valley Transportation Company would purchase the locomotive, with plans to restore it to operation for excursion use. It arrived in Scranton, Pennsylvania in May 2023. In June 2025, mechanical restoration of the locomotive was complete. It made its public debut in July on Delaware-Lackawanna trackage.
  - No.17 and No.19 are preserved at the National Museum of Mexican Railways in Puebla. Unit DH-17 (former D&H #17) was painted in the classic Southern Pacific Daylight colors, but as of February 2010 had been painted over in primer.
- Ex-Denver and Rio Grande PB-1 6002 was converted to a steam generator car in October 1965; it gained Blomberg B trucks in 1980. It was sold to Ansco in late 1987 for service on the Ski Train and later sold again in 2007 to the Algoma Central Railway.

== Additional Reading ==
- Aslaksen, James and McCormack, Doyle. NKP190.com. Retrieved on March 26, 2005.
- Hayden, Bob, ed. (1980). Model Railroader Cyclopedia-Volume 2: Diesel Locomotives. Kalmbach Books. ISBN 0-89024-547-9.
- Hollingsworth, Brian and Arthur F. Cook (1987). The Great Book of Trains. Portland House, New York, NY. ISBN 0-517-64515-7.
- Pinkepank, Jerry A. (1973). The Second Diesel Spotter's Guide. Kalmbach Publishing Co., Milwaukee, WI. ISBN 0-89024-026-4.
- Romano, Andy (1997). PA: Alco's Glamour Girl. Four Ways West Publications. ISBN 1-885614-16-0.
- Stumpf, Rolf. ALCO World: Paulista RR. Retrieved on March 26, 2005.
- The Santa Fe Diesel Volume One: Dieselization - 1960 by Dr. Cinthia Priest pages 52–56.
- EMD Repowered Locomotives see EMD order #8506 dated August 1954 for repowering data on the AT&SF 51 set of PAs.
