= ALCO DL-202 =

ALCO DL-202 & DL-203 “Black Maria”
Type and origin
- Power type: Diesel-electric
- Builder: American Locomotive Company
- Serial number: 71257–71258 (A units), 69974 (B unit)
- Model: DL202-2 (A units) and DL203-2 (B unit)
- Total produced: 2 A units, 1 B unit
Specifications
- Configuration
  - AAR: B-B
  - UIC: Bo′Bo′
- Prime mover: ALCO 12-241
- Engine type: Four-stroke diesel
- Cylinders: V12
Performance figures
- Power output: 1,500 hp (1.12 MW)
Career
- Operators: American Locomotive Company
- Numbers: 1500A, B, C
- Disposition: All scrapped, September 1947

The ALCO DL-202-2 and DL-203-2 diesel-electric locomotive (known informally as the Black Maria) was an experimental freight locomotive produced by ALCO of Schenectady, New York. The primary diesel builders Alco, Baldwin and EMD pushed the War Production Board (WPB) for more opportunities to build more diesels. The Transportation Equipment Division of the WPB announced a production schedule on December 10, 1943, that allowed Alco to build one 4500 horsepower experimental diesel locomotive. This experimental diesel locomotive was to be built in the fourth quarter of 1944. The two A units were built in January 1945 and the B unit at a later date in 1945. The two A units were put on test at Building No. 37 at Schenectady to work out problems with the connecting rods and turbocharger in the Alco 241 engine, developed by both McIntosh and Seymour and ALCo. The total production run included 2 cab DL202-2 A units, and a single DL203-2 B (cabless booster) unit. The locomotives were powered by a V12 ALCO 241 diesel engine, rated at 1,500 hp (1.1 MW). The units were released for test in September 1945. The locomotive could attain a top speed of 80 mph (130 km/h) (Freight) and 125 mph (201 km/h) (Passenger). With the B-B wheel arrangement and carbody construction, equipment layout and electrical gear these experimental units were the immediate predecessors of the FA units to come in early 1946. Outwardly, the bodies strongly resembled those on the DL-109, some of which were still under construction at Schenectady in early 1945.

The three units were numbered 1500A, B, C and were tested on the New York Central Railroad, the Delaware and Hudson Railroad, the New York, New Haven and Hartford Railroad, and the Bangor and Aroostook Railroad, among others. As no orders materialized for such units, and no railroad bought the demonstrators, the set was scrapped in Schenectady New York September 1947.
