= EMC E3 =

American diesel-passenger locomotive

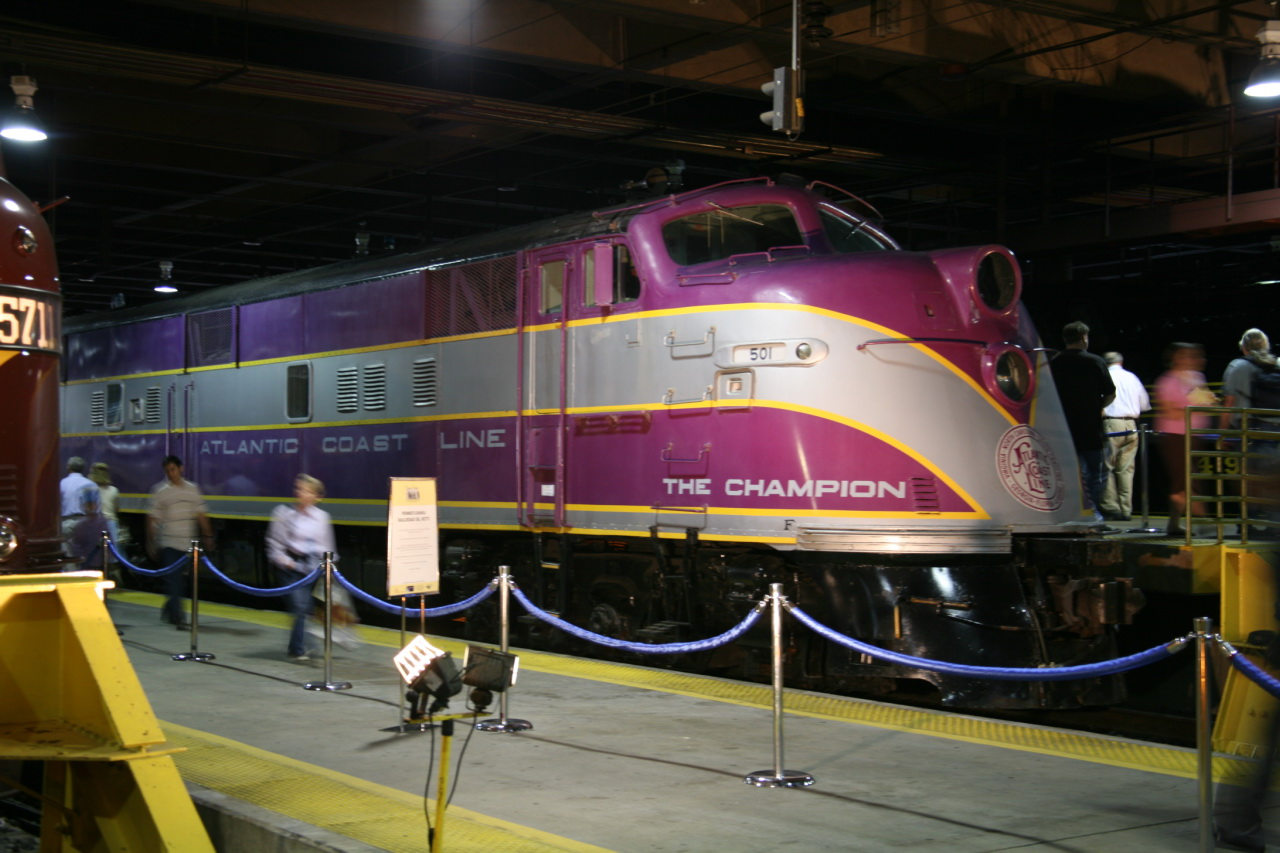
- ACL #501 at the North Carolina Transportation Museum. On the down left is lettering The Champion.
Type and origin
- Power type: Diesel-electric
- Builder: Electro-Motive Corporation (EMC)
- Model: E3
- Build date: September 1938 – June 1940
- Total produced: 17 A units, 2 B units
Specifications
- Configuration
  - AAR: A1A-A1A
- Gauge: 4 ft 8 1/2 in (1,435 mm)
- Trucks: EMC Blomberg A-1-A passenger
- Wheel diameter: 36 in (914 mm)
- Minimum curve: 21° (274.37 ft or 83.63 m radius)
- Wheelbase: 57 ft 1 in (17.40 m)
- Length: 70 ft 4 in (21.44 m) over coupler pulling faces
- Width: 10 ft 7 in (3.23 m)
- Height: 15 ft 10 in (4.83 m)
- Loco weight: 308,400 lb (139,900 kg)
- Fuel capacity: 1,200 US gal (1,000 imp gal; 4,500 L)
- Prime mover: (2) EMC 12-567C
- RPM range: 800 max
- Engine type: (2) V12 Two-stroke diesel
- Aspiration: Roots blower
- Displacement: 6,804 cu in (111.50 L) each
- Generator: (2) EMC D-4
- Traction motors: (4) EMC D-7
- Cylinders: (2) 12
Performance figures
- Maximum speed: 116 mph (187 km/h)
- Power output: 2,000 hp (1,490 kW) total
- Tractive effort: Starting: 56,500 lbf (25,628 kgf) @25% Continuous: 31,000 lbf (14,061 kgf) @11 mph (18 km/h)
Career
- Preserved: Atlantic Coast Line 501 preserved at the North Carolina Transportation Museum
- Disposition: One preserved, remainder scrapped

The EMC E3 is a 2,000 horsepower (1,500 kW), A1A-A1A diesel-electric passenger locomotive that was manufactured by Electro-Motive Corporation of La Grange, Illinois as part of the E Series of EMC/EMD diesel passenger locomotives. The EMC demonstrator #822 was released from La Grange for test on September 12, 1938. The cab version, or E3A, was manufactured from September 1938 to June 1940, and 17 were produced. The booster version, or E3B, was manufactured in March 1939 and September 1939, and 2 were produced. The 2,000 hp (1,500 kW) was achieved by putting two 1,000 horsepower (750 kW), 12-cylinder, model 567 engines in the engine compartment. Each engine drove its own electrical generator to power the traction motors. The E3 was the fourth model in a long line of passenger diesels of similar design known as EMD E-units.

Compared with passenger locomotives made later by EMD, the noses of the E3, E4, E5, and E6 cab units had pronounced slants when viewed from the side. Therefore, these four models have been nicknamed "slant nose" units. Later E models had the more vertical "bulldog nose" of the F series. E3 demonstrator 822 was built with a nose identical to earlier EA and E1A units, but later locomotives in the series featured an elevated headlamp mounted in a nacelle, distinct from the flush profile mounting of the earlier units. 822 was modified in a similar fashion prior to delivery to the Kansas City Southern Railway.

== Engine and powertrain ==
The E3 introduced a 12-cylinder version of the 567 series Diesel engine, with two being used for a total of 2,000 hp at 800 rpm. Earlier E-units had used two Winton 201A prime movers, but that engine was ill-suited to railroad use and was unreliable. The 567, which was specifically designed for railroad motive power applications, is a mechanically aspirated, two-stroke 45-degree V-type with 567 cubic inches (9,290 cm^{3}; 9.29 L) displacement per cylinder, and remained in production until 1966. Two direct current generators, one per engine, provide power to four traction motors, two on each truck, in an A1A-A1A arrangement. This truck design was used on all E-units and on MP 7100, CB&Q 9908, and Rock Island AB6 power cars. EMC/EMD has built all of its major components since 1939.

== Original owners ==
=== A units ===
image	Railroad	Quantity	Road numbers	Notes
	Electro-Motive Corporation (demonstrator)	1	822	to Kansas City Southern Railway #1
	Atlantic Coast Line Railroad	2	500, 501	500 was wrecked in Fleming, GA in 1953 and rebuilt by EMD as an E8A. 501 was wrecked before delivery and rebuilt by EMC as an E6A. The 501 is preserved at the NCTM.
	Atchison, Topeka and Santa Fe Railway	1	11	
	Chicago and North Western Railway	4	5001A, 5001B, 5002A, 5002B	Initially used in A-A back-to-back pairs on the Twin Cities 400.
	Chicago, Rock Island and Pacific Railroad	2	625, 626	
	Florida East Coast Railroad	2	1001, 1002	
	Kansas City Southern Railway	2	2, 3	
	Missouri Pacific Railroad	2	7000, 7001	Built with two sets of double round portholes on each side.
	Union Pacific Railroad	1	LA-5	Built with two sets of triple round portholes, similar to the UP EMC E2; later modified and renumbered.
Total	17			

=== B units ===
Railroad	Quantity	Road numbers	Notes
Atchison, Topeka and Santa Fe Railway	1	11A	
Union Pacific Railroad	1	LA-6	matched with A-unit (see notes for UP LA-5)

== Surviving example ==
The only remaining E3 is ex-Atlantic Coast Line Railroad E3A #501. It was formerly owned by the late Glen Monhart, and operated on excursions in Wisconsin. Later, it was owned by the North Carolina Dept. of Transportation Rail Division, and was on long-term loan to the North Carolina Transportation Museum, in Spencer, North Carolina. In January 2013, NCDOT transferred ownership of the engine to the NC Department of Cultural Resources, Spencer Shops parent organization. It is stored in operating condition, and is run occasionally.

== See also ==
- List of GM-EMD locomotives

== Bibliography ==
- Dorin, Patrick C. (1972). Chicago and North Western Power. Burbank, California: Superior Publishing. p. 128-129. ISBN 0-87564-715-4.
- Lamb, J. Parker (2007). Evolution of the American Diesel Locomotive. Railroads Past and Present. Bloomington, Indiana: Indiana University Press. ISBN 978-0-253-34863-0.
- Marre, Louis A. (1995). Diesel Locomotives: The First 50 Years: A Guide to Diesels Built Before 1972. Railroad Reference Series. Waukesha, Wisconsin: Kalmbach Publishing. ISBN 978-0-89024-258-2.
- Pinkepank, Jerry A. (1973). The Second Diesel Spotter's Guide. Milwaukee, Wisconsin: Kalmbach Publishing. ISBN 978-0-89024-026-7.
- Ross, David, ed. (2003). The Encyclopedia of Trains and Locomotives. Barnes and Noble. ISBN 978-0-7607-9679-5.
- Schafer, Mike (1998). Vintage Diesel Locomotives. Enthusiast Color Series. Osceola, Wisconsin: MBI Publishing. ISBN 978-0-7603-0507-2.
- Solomon, Brian (2000). The American Diesel Locomotive. Osceola, Wisconsin: MBI Publishing Company. pp. 53–56, 63, 65, 67, 68, 70. ISBN 978-0-7603-0666-6.
- Solomon, Brian (2006). EMD Locomotives. St. Paul, Minnesota: Voyageur Press. ISBN 978-0-7603-2396-0.
- Solomon, Brian (2010). Vintage Diesel Power. Minneapolis, Minnesota: MBI Publishing. ISBN 978-0-7603-3795-0.
- Solomon, Brian (2011). Electro-Motive E-Units and F-Units: The Illustrated History of North America's Favorite Locomotives. Minneapolis, Minnesota: Voyageur Press. ISBN 978-0-7603-4007-3.
- Solomon, Brian (2012). North American Locomotives: A Railroad-by-Railroad Photohistory. Minneapolis, Minnesota: Voyageur Press. ISBN 978-0-7603-4370-8.
- Wilson, Jeff (2002). E Units: Electro-Motive's Classic Streamliners. Classic Trains / Golden Years of Railroading series. Waukesha, WI, USA: Kalmbach Publishing. ISBN 0890246068.
