= EMC E5 =

Diesel locomotive

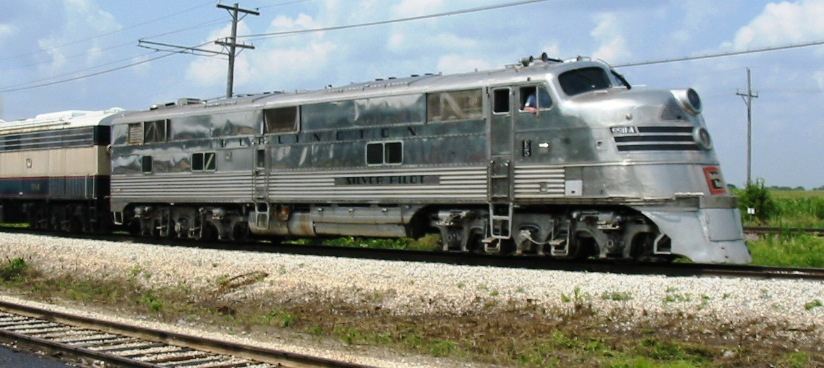
- CB&Q EMC E5 No. 9911A Silver Pilot at the Illinois Railway Museum
Type and origin
- Power type: Diesel-electric
- Builder: Electro-Motive Corporation
- Model: E5
- Build date: February 1940 – June 1941
- Total produced: 11 A units, 5 B units
Specifications
- Configuration
  - AAR: A1A-A1A
- Gauge: 4 ft 8 1/2 in (1,435 mm)
- Wheel diameter: 36 in (0.914 m)
- Wheelbase
  - Truck: 14 ft 1 in (4.29 m)
- Length: 71 ft 1 in (21.67 m)
- Width: 10 ft 3 in (3.12 m)
- Height: 15 ft 0 in (4.57 m)
- Loco weight: A unit: 315,000 lb (142,882 kg); B unit: 290,000 lb (131,542 kg)
- Prime mover: 2 EMD 12-567
- Engine type: V12 Two-stroke diesel
- Cylinders: 12 × 2
- Loco brake: D22L
Performance figures
- Maximum speed: 116 mph (187 km/h)
- Power output: 2,000 hp (1,491 kW)
- Tractive effort
  - Starting: 56,500 lbf (25,628 kgf)
  - Continuous: 31,000 lbf (14,061 kgf) @11 mph (18 km/h)
Career
- Operators: Chicago, Burlington & Quincy Railroad and subsidiaries
- Disposition: One preserved, 15 scrapped

The EMC E5 is a 2,000-horsepower (1,500 kW), A1A-A1A passenger train-hauling diesel locomotive manufactured by Electro-Motive Corporation, and its corporate successor, General Motors' Electro-Motive Division (EMD) of La Grange, Illinois. It was produced exclusively for the Chicago, Burlington & Quincy Railroad and its subsidiaries in 1940 and 1941.

The E5 was distinguished from the otherwise very similar E3, E4 and E6 by being clad in polished stainless steel to match the Burlington's Zephyr trains. It also featured unique small grill-like ornamentation on both sides of the upper headlight. Like the other pre-war models in the E-series, the E5 had a sloping “slant nose” design and was equipped with two headlights—a regular stationary headlight below a gyrating Mars signal light. The E5 was the sixth model in the EMD E-unit series.

== Engine and powertrain ==
The E5 was powered by twin 12-cylinder prime movers, developing a total of 2,000 hp (1,500 kW) at 800 rpm. Designed specifically for railroad locomotives, the mechanically aspirated, two-stroke, 45-degree V-type engine, with an 8 1/2 in (216 mm) bore by 10 in (254 mm) stroke, giving 567 cubic inches (9,290 cm^{3}; 9.29 L) displacement per cylinder. This engine design remained in production until 1966.

The E5 was originally intended to look very different with the cab section looking very similar to the streamlined diesel passenger trains that the CB&Q was famous for.

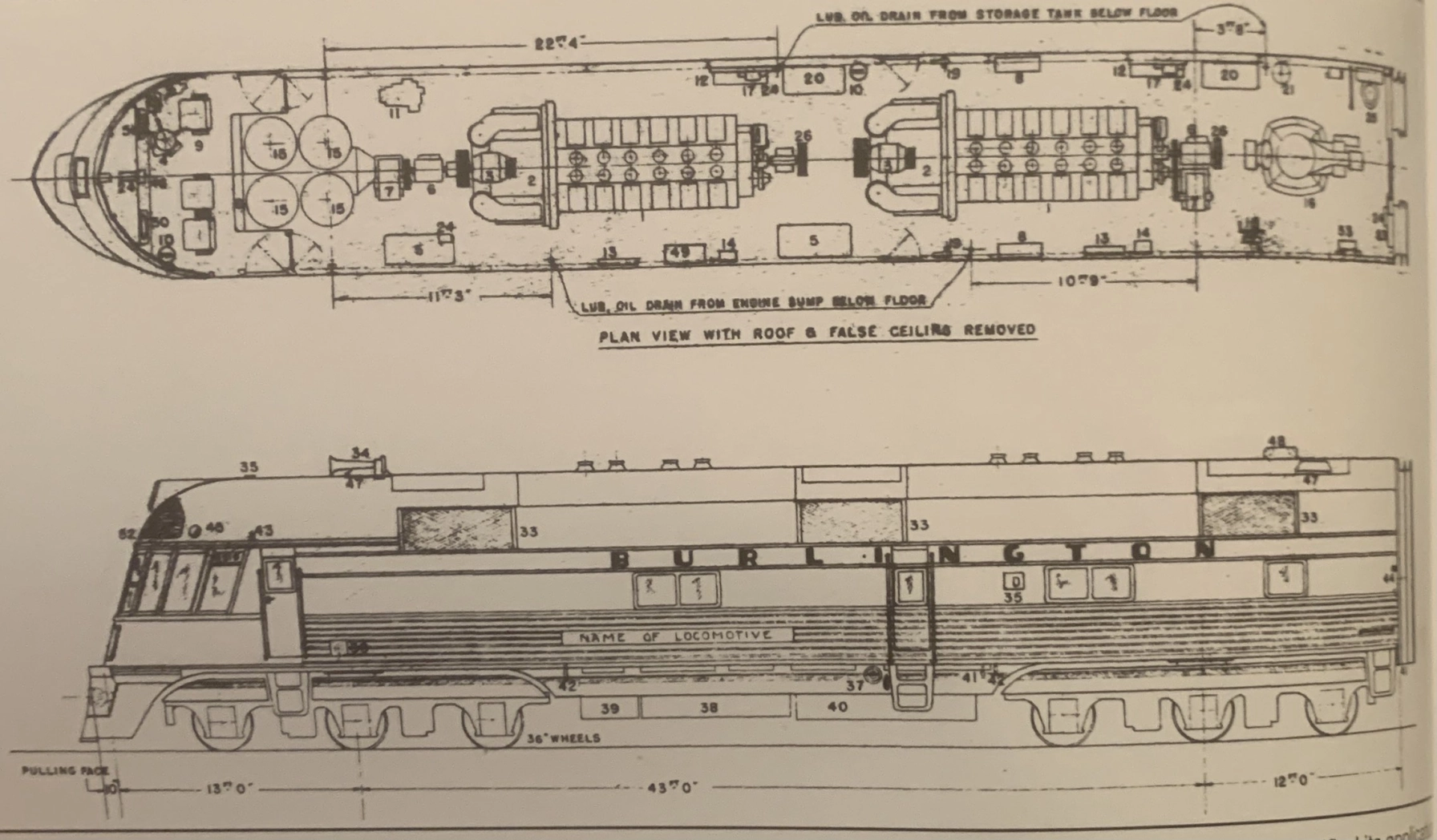
The original design for the E5, note the cab shape. This design was created on October 23, 1939.

Power for the locomotive's traction was provided by two direct-current generators, one for each prime mover. This generators powered four traction motors, two on each truck, in an A1A-A1A arrangement. This truck design was used across all E units, as well as on the MP 7100 AA6, CB&Q 9908, and CRI&P AB6 power cars. Since 1939, EMC/EMD has manufactured all of its major components.

== Original owners ==
Image	Railroad	Cab-equipped A units	Cabless booster B units	Road numbers A units	Road numbers B units	Notes
	Chicago, Burlington & Quincy Railroad	9	3	9910A–9912A, 9909, 9913, 9914A,B, 9915A,B	9910B–9912B	9911A preserved in operating condition at the Illinois Railway Museum
	Colorado & Southern Railway	1	1	9950A	9950B	
	Fort Worth & Denver Railway	1	1	9980A	9980B	
	Total	11	5			

== Locomotive details ==
Name	Cab or Booster	#(as built)	EMD order no.	EMD serial no.	Build date	History
Silver Bullet	(cab)	9909	E 278-A	970	Mar 1940	to C&S 9953 in Dec 1955;
Silver Speed	(cab)	9910A	E 278-A	967	Feb 1940	to C&S 9951A in Aug 1955; retired Oct 1967 and traded in to EMD on an SD40
Silver Power	(booster)	9910B	E 279-B	971	Feb 1940	to C&S 9951B in Aug 1955; retired Oct 1967 and traded in to EMD on an SD40
Silver Pilot	(cab)	9911A	E 278-A	968	Feb 1940	to FW&D 9982A in Aug 1955; to C&S 9952A in Oct 1955; retired in Mar 1968 and traded in to EMD on an SD40, purchased by Illinois Railway Museum in 1969
Silver Mate	(booster)	9911B	E 279-B	972	Feb 1940	to FW&D 9982B in Aug 1955; to C&S 9952B in Oct 1955; retired in Mar 1968 and traded in to EMD on an SD40
Silver Meteor	(cab)	9912A	E 278-A	969	Mar 1940	retired Mar 1965 and traded in
Silver Comet	(booster)	9912B	E 279-B	973	Mar 1940	retired Mar 1965 and traded in
Silver Wings	(cab)	9913	E 331-A	1133	Oct 1940	to C&S 9954 in Apr 1957
Silver Arrow	(cab)	9914A	E 377-A	1301	Jun 1941	to C&S 9955 in Sep 1961
Silver Swift	(cab)	9914B	E 377-A	1302	Jun 1941	wrecked at Nodaway, Missouri in Aug 1960; retired and scrapped
Silver Carrier	(cab)	9915A	E 377-A	1303	Jun 1941	wrecked at Biglow, Missouri in Apr 1963; retired and scrapped
Silver Clipper	(cab)	9915B	E 377-A	1304	Jun 1941	retired Mar 1965 and traded in
Silver Racer	(cab)	9950A (C&S)	E 278-A	1035	Mar 1940	
Silver Steed	(booster)	9950B (C&S)	E 279-B	1037	Mar 1940	
Silver Chief	(cab)	9980A (FW&D)	E 278-A	1036	Mar 1940	
Silver Warrior	(booster)	9980B (FW&D)	E 279-B	1038	Mar 1940	

== Surviving example ==
Only one E5 unit of the original 16 built survives today. The last surviving EMD E5 diesel, CB&Q No. 9911A Silver Pilot, is owned and operated by the Illinois Railway Museum in Union, Illinois. The locomotive was last used by the Fort Worth & Denver Railway on the Texas Zephyr. It is now paired with one of the Burlington's Nebraska Zephyrs, a five car, articulated, stainless steel passenger train from 1936.

This equipment has been featured in several film productions, including the 1992 movie A League of Their Own and the 2006 movie Flags of Our Fathers. E5 9911A Silver Pilot was used with four stainless steel passenger cars relettered to resemble the Zephyr train set. 9911 is equipped with dual horns, which is a Leslie A200-156 and a Leslie S2M.

== See also ==
- List of GM-EMD locomotives
