= EMD E-unit =

American diesel-passenger locomotive

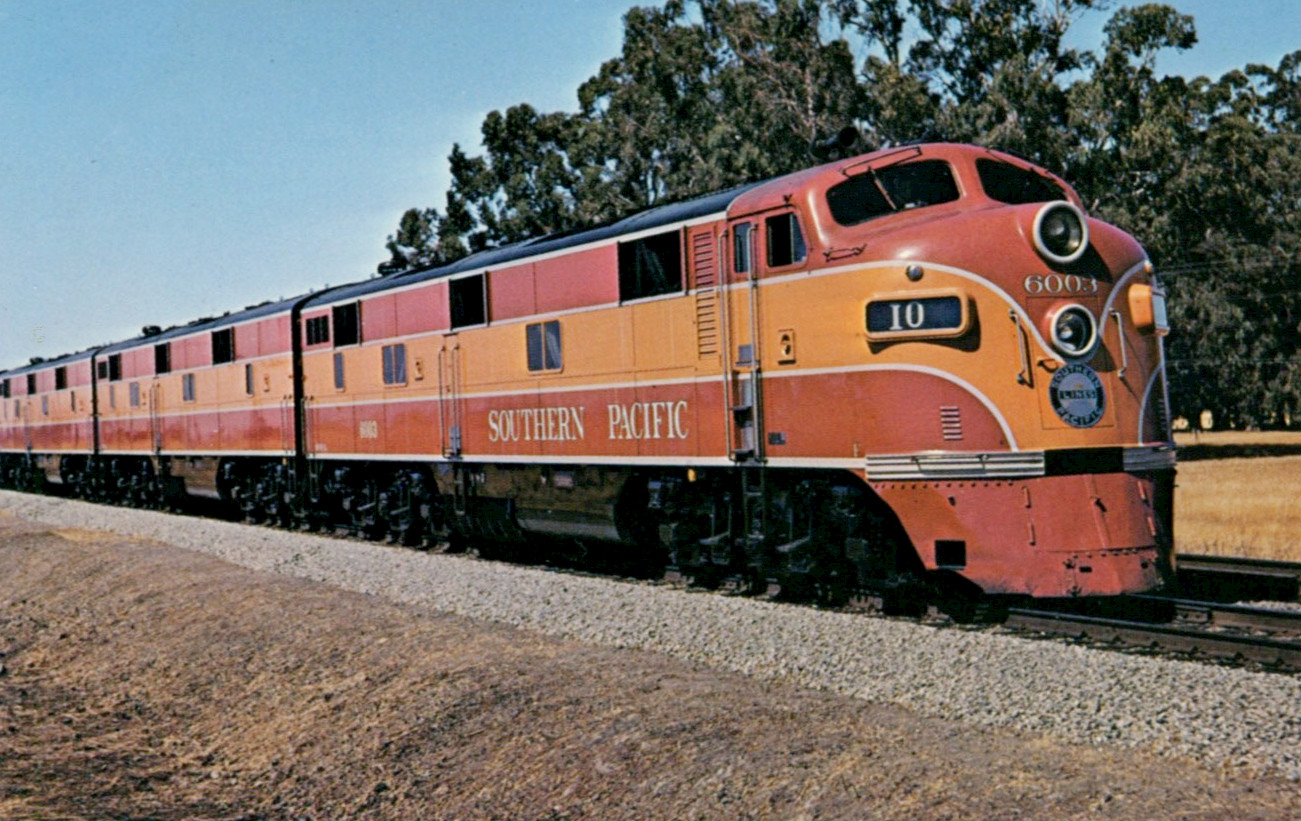
Southern Pacific EMD E7s on the Shasta Daylight in 1949

EMD E-units were a line of passenger train streamliner diesel locomotives built by the General Motors Electro-Motive Division (EMD) and its predecessor the Electro-Motive Corporation (EMC). Final assembly for all E-units was in La Grange, Illinois. Production ran from May 1937, to December, 1963 with 1,294 units produced. The name E-units refers to the model numbers given to each successive type, which all began with E. The E originally stood for eighteen hundred horsepower (1800 hp = 1300 kW), the power of the earliest model, but the letter was kept for later models of higher power.

The predecessors of the E-units were the EMC 1800 hp B-B locomotives built in 1935. These had similar power and mechanical layouts to the E-units, but in boxcab bodies on AAR type B two-axle trucks.

EMC also introduced the TA model in 1937, selling six to the Rock Island. This had similar carbody styling, but otherwise had more in common with UP M-10001, M-10002, and M-10003 to M-10006, in that it was a 1,200 hp (900 kW), single-engined unit on B-B trucks instead of the E-units' A1A-A1A wheel arrangement. It is not part of the E-unit series.

The EMD F-units followed the basic B-B truck design of the TA model, but with a V-16 EMD 567 prime mover generating 1350 hp as introduced in 1939.

E-units standardized the two engine configuration for passenger locomotives to maximize power and, while the less-reliable Winton Diesel prime movers were in use, faced a less severe loss of power should one of the engines become disabled. While E-units were used singly for shorter trains, longer trains needed multiple locomotive units; many railroads used triple units. E-units could be purchased with or without cabs; units with a cab are called A units or lead units, while cabless units are called B units or booster units. B units did contain hostler controls, but they could not be so controlled on the main line. The locomotive units were linked together with cables which enabled the crew in the lead unit to control the trailing units. Railroads tended to buy either ABA sets (two cab-equipped units facing in opposite directions with a booster in between) or ABB sets (a single cab with a pair of boosters). The former did not need to be turned to pull in either direction, but B units were less expensive than A units and gave a smoother line to the train.

As locomotives of EMC's own standardized design produced in-house, expandable to meet various power requirements, the E-units marked the arrival of Diesel power benefiting from economies of scale and were adequate for full-sized consists, a significant threshold in the viability of Diesel motive power as a replacement for steam in passenger service.

== Development ==
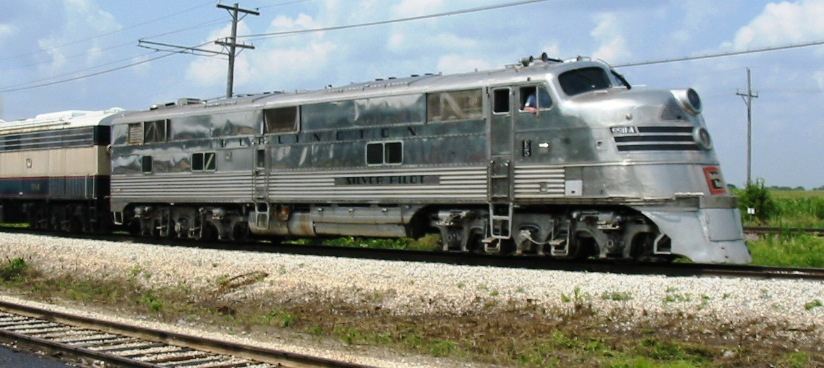
CB&Q 9911A, an EMD E5, operating at the Illinois Railway Museum, July 18, 2004.

The EA/EB, E1, and E2 models were powered by twin 900 hp Winton 201A V-12 engines in each power unit. They were standardized mechanically and in overall design. Union Pacific's E2 cab unit was distinguished from the slant-nosed EA and E1 units by its bulbous nose, round porthole style windows, and stainless steel ornamentation on the pilot and nose. The "E" designation originated to denote the locomotive units' Eighteen hundred horsepower, as opposed to the Twelve hundred horsepower "T" units but was later used to refer to all carbody constructed twin-engine mainline passenger locomotives units produced by EMC. Their twin V-12 diesel engine layout, Blomberg A-1-A trucks, and 57 ft 1 in (17.40 m) wheelbase would become the standard for all future E models. EMC/EMD has built all of its major components since 1939.

The E3, E4, E5, and E6 had the new GM-EMC 567 purpose-designed locomotive engines, for a total of 2,000 hp (1.5 MW). They had the sharply raked "slant nose", and square windows on the sides (with the exception of Union Pacific orders with porthole style windows). Production stopped in 1942. The E5 designation was used for Chicago Burlington and Quincy's stainless steel clad locomotives in keeping with their Zephyr theme.

The EA/EB, E1, E2, E4, and E5 model names reflected EMC's early convention of assigning a model name for each individual customer order. EMC started to change that convention with the multiple-customer E3 model and the new naming convention was fully incorporated with the E6 model.

The E7 was introduced in 1945, and became the best selling E model. It had the improved 567 "A" engine, and the F style "bulldog nose".

The E8 and E9 were the final E models. The E8 had 12-V567B engines (2,250 hp (1.68 MW) total), while the E9 had uprated 12V-567C engines (2,400 hp (1.8 MW) total). They both used the same body style, with a grille along the top of the sides the length of the loco, and several "porthole" windows below it.

Model descriptions are as originally built; EMC/EMD locomotives are often rebuilt to newer standards.

== Engines ==
While there were some cosmetic differences between E-unit models, the major line of development was technological, and largely that of increasing power. The first model, the EA/EB, was rated at 1,800 hp (1,300 kW), then the E3 was rated at 2,000 hp (1,500 kW). The last model, the E9, was rated at 2,400 hp (1,800 kW).

Early models (EA/EB through E2) used the Winton 201-A engine that had been developed in the early 1930s by the partnership of General Motors and Winton. While this engine represented a breakthrough in power-to-weight ratios and output flexibility for Diesel engines, it was a compromise between marine and locomotive requirements and wasn't well suited to the sustained full throttle operation often needed in railroad service. It was not unusual for heavy repairs to be done en route on one engine while the other engine propelled the train at reduced speed. The 201-A engines used in E-units were 900 hp (670 kW) V12s. Experience with the 201-A, which was the first two-stroke Diesel engine in operational use, was invaluable in the development of the next-generation Diesel engine, the EMD 567, a purpose-designed engine that achieved a factor-of-five improvement in piston life for locomotive use.

The E3 introduced the 567 series engine, which would power all later E units, the 567 being a mechanically aspirated two stroke 45 degree V-type with 567 cu in (9.29 L) displacement per cylinder, a total of 6,804 cu in (111.50 L) per engine. Models E3 through E9 used the EMD model 567 engine, named after its engine displacement in cubic inches per cylinder. The 567 model had been developed by EMD specifically for locomotive use, and exhibited excellent performance and reliability in high speed passenger train service. The 567 had a greater displacement per cylinder than the 201-A and ran at a higher maximum rpm, elements which when combined gave greater engine output. The 12V-567 V12 model used in the E3 through E6 developed 1,000 hp (750 kW). The E7 model used the 12V-567A rated at 1,000 hp. The E8 used the more advanced 567B unit, with improved exhaust manifolds and other enhancements to give 1,125 hp (839 kW) each. More development resulted in the 1,200 hp (890 kW) 567C engine used in the E9.

== Trucks ==
All E-units used the same EMD passenger truck design by engineer Martin Blomberg. This was an A1A-A1A truck, with the outer axles powered and the center axle unpowered. Like the well-known two-axle Blomberg B trucks, these trucks had outside spring hangers between the wheels for better cushioning of side-to-side motion. Also like the Blomberg B, there were no drop equalizers between the axles. Two direct current generators powered four traction motors, two on each truck, in an A1A-A1A arrangement. This truck design was used on all E units and on CB&Q 9908 and MP 7100 power cars. The success of the design is shown by the few changes to it over the years.

== Styling ==
The EA and E1 had sloping noses with recessed headlights, while the E2 had a more bulbous "bulldog" nose. Models E3 through E6 had a sloping nose but with a protruding headlight, while models E7 through E9 used a less sloped (closer to vertical) style like the freight F-units. A patent of 1937 signed by several EMC engineers defined the styling.

Many older E-units were updated to newer styles. The E8 introduced the one-piece stamped Farr stainless-steel side grilles that made a continuous band from front to rear just below the roof, but these were often retrofitted to earlier units. Side windows were half-rounded on the EA/EB, square on the E1, round on the E2, square on most E3 through E7 units, and rounded portholes again on the E8 and E9, but again many railroads updated older locomotives.

The E5 units were unique, produced for the Chicago, Burlington and Quincy Railroad in all stainless steel with fluted lower carbody sides, to match the railroad's Zephyr passenger trains.

== Other changes ==
Other improvements occurred independently of the change in engine design. The E8, for example, was the first model to incorporate electric cooling fans, and offer dynamic braking as an option.

== Models ==
Model designation	Build year	Total produced	AAR wheel arrangement	Prime mover	Power output	Image
EA/EB	1937–1938	6 A units, 6 B units (Note: For the Baltimore and Ohio Railroad.)	A1A-A1A	Winton 201-A	1,800 hp (1,300 kW)	
E1	1937–1938	8 A units, 3 B units (Note: For the Atchison, Topeka and Santa Fe Railway.)	A1A-A1A	Winton 201-A	1,800 hp (1,300 kW)	
E2	1937	2 A units, 4 B units (Note: In 2 ABB sets. For the jointly owned and run Union Pacific Railroad, Chicago and North Western Railway, and Southern Pacific trains City of San Francisco and City of Los Angeles.)	A1A-A1A	Winton 201-A	1,800 hp (1,300 kW)	
E3	1938–1940	17 A units, 2 B units (Note: For the Atchison, Topeka and Santa Fe Railway (1 A, 1 B), Atlantic Coast Line Railroad (2 A), Chicago, Rock Island and Pacific Railroad (2 A), Florida East Coast Railroad (2 A), Kansas City Southern Railroad (2 A, + ex EMC demonstrator A), Chicago and North Western Railway (4 A), Missouri Pacific Railroad (2 A), and Union Pacific Railroad (1 A, 1 B).)	A1A-A1A	EMD 567	2,000 hp (1,490 kW)	
E4	1938-1939	14 A units, 5 B units (Note: For the Seaboard Air Line.)	A1A-A1A	EMD 567	2,000 hp (1,490 kW)	
E5	1940–1941	11 A units, 5 B units (Note: For the Chicago, Burlington and Quincy Railroad.)	A1A-A1A	EMD 567	2,000 hp (1,490 kW)	
E6	1939–1942	91 A units, 26 B units	A1A-A1A	EMD 567	2,000 hp (1,490 kW)	
E7	1945–1949	428 A units, 82 B units	A1A-A1A	EMD 567A	2,000 hp (1,490 kW)	
E8	1949–1954	450 A units, 46 B units	A1A-A1A	EMD 567B	2,250 hp (1,678 kW)	
E9	1954–1964	100 A units, 44 B units	A1A-A1A	EMD 567C	2,400 hp (1,790 kW)	

== Surviving E-units ==
A number of E-units survive, many are in good running order. Several railroads retain sets that haul passenger specials, management inspection specials, etc. Others survive in museums or on short lines.

The Illinois Railway Museum in Union, Illinois has one of the largest collections of operable and preserved E's including CB&Q E5 9911A and WSOR 102, one of the few remaining operable B units.

The Southeastern Railway Museum in Duluth, Georgia has Southern Railway #6901, an E8 that once powered the Southern Crescent.
