= ALCO 241 =

Diesel locomotive engine

The ALCO 241 was a diesel prime mover built by the American Locomotive Company (ALCO). It was the company's first diesel engine originally designed to power road locomotives, with a higher output and operating speed than previous designs.

The introduction of EMC's FT freight diesel in 1939 made Alco management realize that they needed a new diesel engine in order to compete for diesel locomotive sales. The engine that Alco needed must be capable of producing in the range of 1500 horsepower for a freight locomotive and 2000 horsepower for a passenger locomotive. The diesel engine that it did have in 1940, the Alco 539T, would produce approximately 1300 horsepower in an eight-cylinder engine. The 539 engine did not have capacity to produce much more than 1300 horsepower. It was not a good candidate for long term locomotive production with capability for greater horsepower.

Design work on the 241, began in 1940, initially led by Ralph Miller, who was shortly thereafter replaced by Paul Vaughan. Alco Engineer Paul Vaughan did a study to recommend a diesel engine specification. His recommendation was for a high speed, 9" X 10.5" V-type diesel engine operating at a maximum of 1,000 rpm with a 45-degree angle between the two cylinder banks. Alco's first attempt at attaining 1500 horsepower in a diesel engine was with the Alco 241 engine program. The 241 engine was approved for development on March 12, 1940. The company authorized both 12 cylinder and 16 cylinder designs. The Alco 241 engine would have a bore (cylinder diameter) of 9 inches (229 mm), and a stroke of 10.5 inches (267 mm). Its designation combines Alco's identifier for that bore and stroke - 2 - with the year its design was approved for laboratory testing - 1941. Alco was focused on creating a diesel engine capable of competing with the EMD FT.

The Alco's design goals for the 241 engine were a high operating speed, a high cylinder output of 135 psi bmep (brake mean effective pressure), a high horsepower to weight ratio, and the capability for growth with later improvements. World War II had begun and the wartime environment caused all of Alco's businesses to grow. The diesel engine engineering and testing staff had been limited by the previous economic conditions of the Great Depression. Prior to the outbreak of the war the Gulf Mobile & Ohio Railroad ordered 80 diesel freight locomotives from Alco when and if there was a successful design. The additional burden of the war created more work for the Alco diesel engineering staff. This engineering work was mostly to expand production of diesel engines for the U. S. Navy. Effective April 4, 1942 the War Production Board began controlling all industrial production. The Transportation Equipment Branch and the Railroad Advisory Committee both of the War Production Board met on April 8, 1942, to develop a railroad equipment production program for the remainder of the year. This group recommended that diesel locomotive builders build for maximum production. Alco and Baldwin would build diesel switchers and EMD would build freight diesels. Faced with these considerable difficulties the Alco diesel engineering staff continued the 241 engine project, but at a very slow pace.

With work delayed by the onset of World War II, the first test engine, a small two-cylinder model, was not tested until late 1943, with larger 12 and 16 cylinder versions under construction at the time. During the design process, engineers concluded that the company's existing turbocharger of choice, a Buchi product, did not have the capacity to allow the engine to reach the desired horsepower output. As a result, in mid-1943, work began with General Electric to incorporate that company's aircraft turbocharger design in the 241 engine. The first tests of a 241 engine with the GE turbo were conducted on the 12-cylinder test engine in March, 1944.

On November 10, 1943, at the locomotive builders meeting with the War Production Board Alco again requested to build road diesels. On December 10, 1943, Alco received approval to build one experimental three unit road freight locomotive in the fourth quarter of 1944. A 12-cylinder 241 engine is put on test at Auburn, New York on March 29, 1944. Testing of 241 engines in 1944 revealed several shortcomings, including failures of the connecting rods and their bearings, and the GE turbocharger's inability to supply sufficient air to the engine as the engine's speed was increased. As a result, work began that year to design a new engine based on the 241; this design was named the 244. Later that year, ALCO management decided to abandon their previous plan to use the 241 in production locomotives, instead choosing to use the new 244 design as soon as possible.

Three 12-cylinder 241 engines were placed in demonstrator road locomotives in 1945, which late in the year underwent testing on the Delaware and Hudson Railroad. During these tests, the aluminum pistons proved to have weakness not found in laboratory testing, while one of the GE turbochargers failed. After installation of redesigned pistons and other modifications in 1945, the locomotives returned to road testing on August 15, 1946, on the New Haven Railroad before moving to the Bangor and Aroostook Railroad in October. These tests were abruptly halted in November after several mechanical problems, including a crankshaft failure in one of the engines. The locomotives subsequently returned to ALCO property, where the engines underwent teardown and inspection, while the carbodies were scrapped. By this time, the 241's successor, the 244, had entered production, and no further work was conducted on the 241 design.
