= Atlantic Coast Line 501 =

Preserved (and only surviving) EMC E3 passenger diesel locomotive

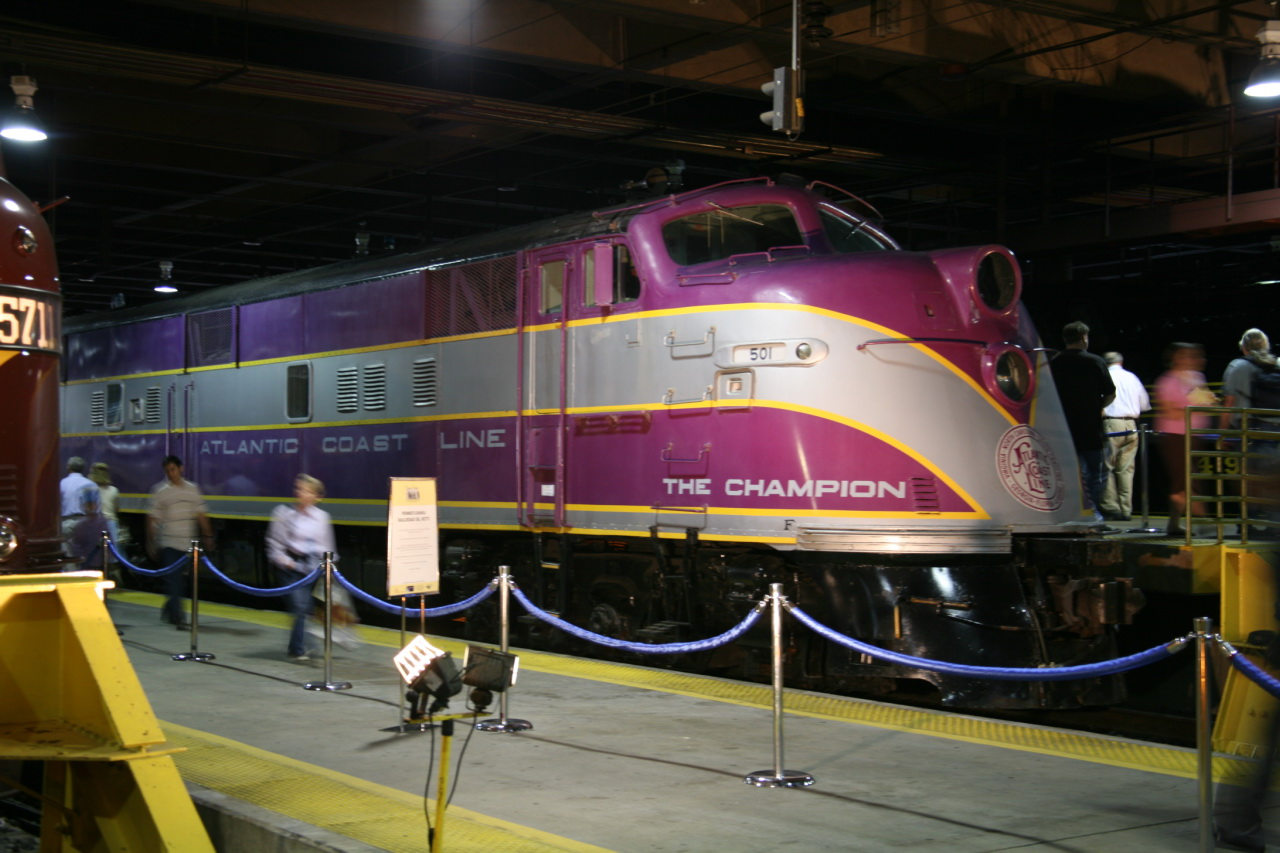
- Atlantic Coast Line No. 501 at the Washington Union Station in 2008
Type and origin
- Power type: Diesel-electric
- Builder: Electro-Motive Company
- Model: E3
- Build date: November 1939
Specifications
- Configuration
  - AAR: A1A-A1A
- Gauge: 4 ft 8 1/2 in (1,435 mm)
- Prime mover: Two 12-cylinder 567
- Engine type: Two-stroke diesel
- Aspiration: Roots blower
Performance figures
- Power output: 2,000 hp (1,491 kW)
Career
- Operators: Atlantic Coast Line Railroad, Wisconsin Western Railroad
- Numbers: 501-A
- Nicknames: The Champion
- Retired: 1970
- Current owner: North Carolina Department of Transportation
- Disposition: Operational

Atlantic Coast Line 501 is an EMC E3 diesel locomotive built in November 1939 for the Atlantic Coast Line Railroad. It was notable for being the sole EMC E3 survivor, though it was rebuilt into an E6 after delivery.

The No. 501 locomotive spent its career pulling the Champion. After retirement from regular service in 1970, the unit was restored to its, as delivered, purple and silver colors by owner Glenn Monhart. In the 1980s, the engine operated on the Wisconsin Western Railroad, a short-lived heritage railway. It is currently operational at the North Carolina Transportation Museum in Spencer, North Carolina.
