= EMC E4 =

20th century train locomotive

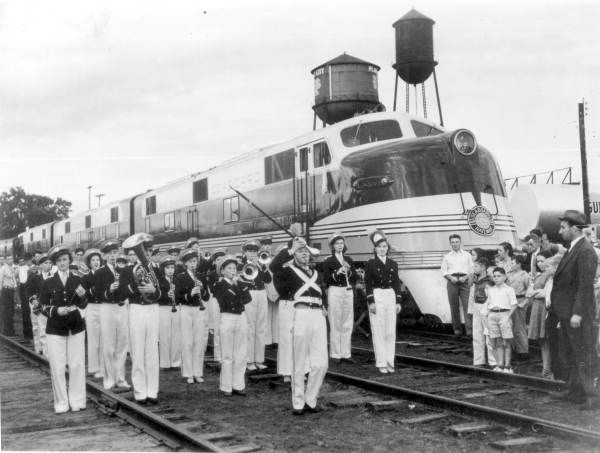
- SAL #3003 leads the Orange Blossom Special into Plant City, Florida, in December 1938, inaugurating diesel service in the Southeast.
Type and origin
- Power type: Diesel-electric
- Builder: Electro-Motive Corporation (EMC)
- Serial number: 832-837 (3000-3005), 838-840 (3100-3102), 807 (3006), 851 (1939 later 3013), 852 (1939B later 1940B then 3104), 960-965 (3007-3012) & 966 (3103).
- Model: E4
- Build date: October 1938 – December 1939
- Total produced: 14 A units, 5 B units
Specifications
- Configuration
  - AAR: A1A-A1A
- Gauge: 4 ft 8 1/2 in (1,435 mm)
- Wheel diameter: 36 in (0.914 m)
- Wheelbase
  - Truck: 14ft 1in
- Length: 71ft 1 1/4in
- Width: 10ft 7in
- Height: 13ft 11in (14ft including horns)
- Loco weight: 315,000 Lbs (A-unit), 290,000 Lbs (B-units)
- Fuel capacity: 1,200 gallons
- Lubricant cap.: 330 gallons
- Sandbox cap.: 16 cu. ft.
- Prime mover: EMC 12-567, 2 off
- RPM
  - Maximum RPM: 800
- Engine type: V12 Two stroke diesel × 2
- Traction motors: GM D7 (4),
- Cylinders: 12 × 2
- Gear ratio: 52:15
- Loco brake: Air brake
Performance figures
- Maximum speed: 116 mph (187 km/h)
- Power output: 2,000 hp (1,500 kW)
- Tractive effort
  - Starting: 56,500 lbf (251.32 kN)
  - Continuous: 31,000 lbf (137.89 kN)
Career
- Operators: Seaboard Air Line
- Retired: 1964
- Disposition: All scrapped

The EMC E4 was a 2,000 horsepower (1,500 kW), A1A-A1A passenger train-hauling diesel locomotive built by the Electro-Motive Corporation of La Grange, Illinois from October 1938 - December 1939. All were built for the Seaboard Air Line Railway. The E4 was the fifth model in a long line of passenger diesels of similar design known as EMD E-units.

The 2,000 hp (1,500 kW) was achieved with two EMC model 567 V12 engines developing 1,000 hp (750 kW), each engine driving its own electrical generator to power the traction motors.

The front noses of the EA, E1A, E3A, E4A, E5A, and E6A cab units had a pronounced slant when viewed from the side. Therefore, these six models have been nicknamed "slant nose" units. Later E-unit models received the same blunted "bulldog nose" as the F-units.

Ironically, the E4 was produced before the E3. Both models were identical, save for the E4 having a pneumatically-operated nose door passageway in order to facilitate crew movement between units in a locomotive consist.

All the E4s were retired and scrapped by 1964. No examples were preserved despite their significance.

== Original owners ==
Image	Railroad	Quantity A units	Quantity B units	Road numbers	Notes
	Electro-Motive Corporation (demonstrator)	1	—	1939	to SAL 3013
	Electro-Motive Corporation (demonstrator)	—	1	1939B	renumbered EMC 1940B, to SAL 3104
	Seaboard Air Line Railway	13	—	3000–3012	
	Seaboard Air Line Railway	—	4	3100–3103	

== See also ==
- List of GM-EMD locomotives
