= ALCO DL-109 =

Model of locomotive

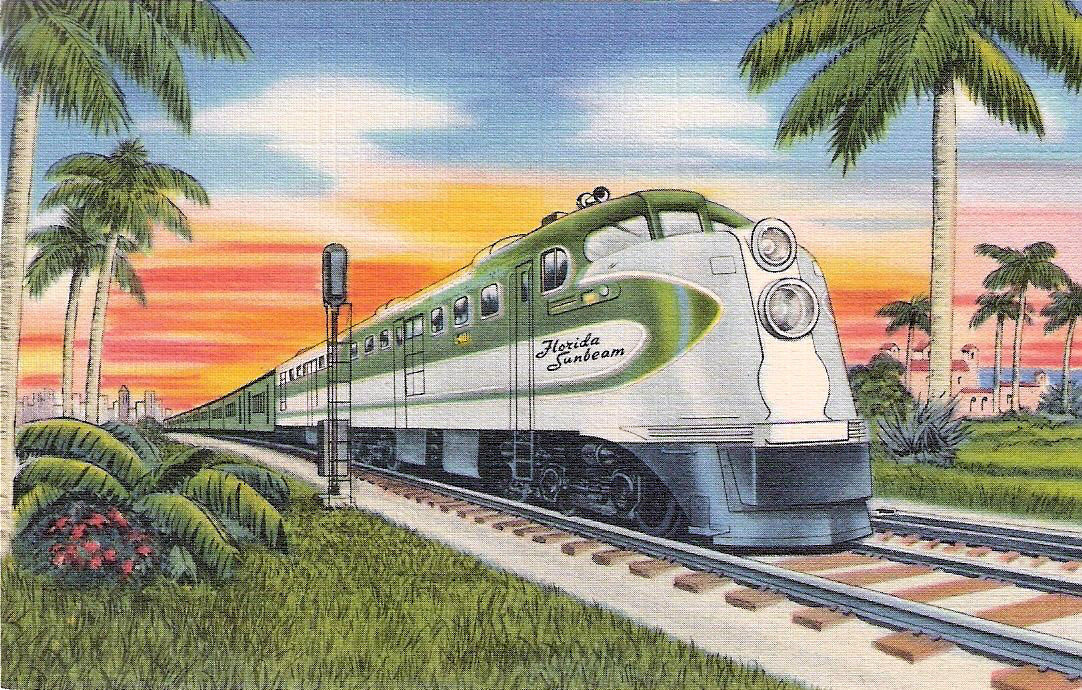
- An ALCO DL-107 pictured in a publicity postcard for the NYC-SOU-SAL Florida Sunbeam
Type and origin
- Power type: Diesel-electric
- Builder: American Locomotive Company (ALCO)
- Model: DL-109
- Build date: December 1939–April 1945
- Total produced: 74 Cab units + 4 Booster units
Specifications
- Configuration
  - AAR: A1A-A1A
- Gauge: 4 ft 8 1/2 in (1,435 mm) standard gauge
- Trucks: ALCO Trimount
- Wheel diameter: 40 in (1,016 mm)
- Minimum curve: 21° (274.37 ft or 83.63 m)
- Wheelbase: 58 ft 4 in (17.78 m)
- Length: DL-103b: 78 ft 11 in (24.05 m); DL-105, DL-107, DL-109: 74 ft 6 1/2 in (22.72 m); DL-108, DL-110: 72 ft 4 in (22.05 m)
- Width: 10 ft (3.05 m)
- Height: 14 ft 6 in (4.42 m)
- Loco weight: DL-103b: 339,000 lb (154,000 kg); DL-105, DL-107, DL-109: 331,000–357,500 lb (150,139.1–162,159.3 kilograms); DL-108, DL-110: 300,700 lb (136,395.2 kilograms)
- Fuel capacity: 1,200 US gal (4,500 L; 1,000 imp gal)
- Prime mover: DL-103b: (2) ALCO 6-538T; DL-105, DL-107/DL-108, DL-109/DL-110: (2) ALCO 6-539T
- RPM range: 315–740
- Engine type: (2) Straight-6 Four-stroke diesel
- Aspiration: Turbocharger
- Generator: (2) GE GT-557
- Traction motors: Passenger: (4) GE 730; Freight: (4) GE 726
- Cylinders: 6
- Cylinder size: 12 in × 13 in (305 mm × 330 mm)
- Gear ratio: DL-103b: 58:25; DL-105: 71:21; DL-107/DL-108: 64:19; DL-109/DL-110: 58:25 (NH units 64:19)
- Loco brake: Straight air
- Train brakes: Air
Performance figures
- Maximum speed: 80–120 mph (129–193 km/h)
- Power output: 2,000 hp (1,490 kW)
- Tractive effort: 56,250 lb (25,510 kg)
Career
- Class: MILW: 20-AP-6, NH: DER-1/b/c
- Locale: U.S.A.
- Disposition: All scrapped

The ALCO DL-109 was one of six models of A1A-A1A diesel locomotives built to haul passenger trains by the American Locomotive Company (ALCO) between December, 1939 and April, 1945 ("DL" stands for Diesel Locomotive). They were of a cab unit design, and both cab-equipped lead A units DL-103b, DL-105, DL-107, DL-109 and cabless booster B units DL-108, DL-110 models were built. The units were styled by noted industrial designer Otto Kuhler, who incorporated into his characteristic cab (US Patent D121,219) the trademark three-piece windshield design. A total of 74 cab units and four cabless booster units were built.

== History ==
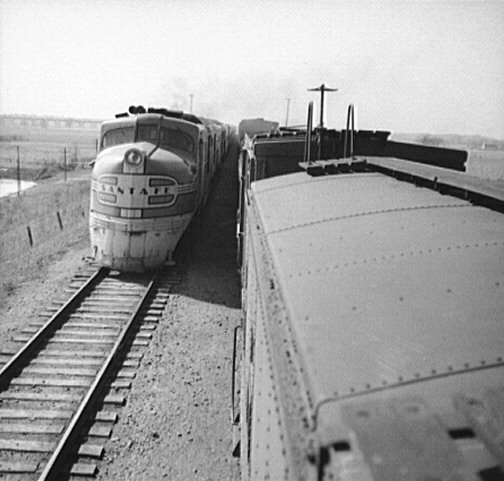
Units #50 and #50A, the Santa Fe Railway's only DL locomotive set, lead the Super Chief during World War II.

All models developed 2,000 hp (1,490 kW). The first unit built as ALCO Specification DL-103b was 4 ft 5 in (1.35 m) longer than the other cab units, and became Chicago, Rock Island and Pacific Railroad #624. The DL-103b had the two radiator sections positioned together at the end of the carbody, while all other units had a split radiator arrangement with one placed at the back of the unit and one situated in the middle. The DL-103b was built with twin 6-cylinder ALCO 538T diesel engines as prime movers; all other DLs in this series were built with the newer twin 6-cylinder ALCO 539T diesel engines. The DL-103b also had all-electric driven accessories, while the later models had belt-driven accessories. The differences between all subsequent models were minor. The DL-105s went to the Rock Island as #622 and GM&O #270-271. All other early customers got DL-107 cab units and DL-108 boosters until the first DL-109 was delivered to the New Haven. During the war, the Gulf, Mobile & Ohio and Southern Railway bought DL109s and the Southern bought the only DL-110. It is not known whether this is because the model was a significant improvement, was the model approved for wartime production, or both.

The New York, New Haven and Hartford Railroad received special permission from the War Production Board to purchase #0710–#0759 as dual-use (passenger/freight) locomotives; they were built between 1942 and 1945. Passenger-only locomotives (including the rival EMD E6) were not approved for production until early 1945. The first ten, numbers 0700 through 0709, were delivered starting right after the attack on Pearl Harbor in December 1941 from ALCO's Schenectady factory, allowing the road to prove their freight-hauling abilities just in time. The New Haven owned the most DL-109s, rostering 60 units (of the 62 built) in 1945. The New Haven DL-109s could be found hauling passenger trains during the day and freight trains at night.

There were different classes among the New Haven units noting some differences between the manufacture of each batch. Initially, they were simply listed in two groups in the Summary of Equipment, with #0700–#0709 listed separately (with a different weight and tractive effort) than the remaining DL-109 locomotives. The 9-30-1945 Summary of Equipment designates four different classes: DER-1 (Diesel-Electric Road) units #0700–#0709 had the original design with a mass of vents on the roof, DER-1b (#0710–#0719) were nearly identical, with square winterization hatches over the roof fan housings (which were also applied to the original units following the winter of 1941), DER-1b (#0720–#0729) and DER-1c (#0730–#0759) all had simplified rooflines, and other minor variations in appearance.

The classes would remain the same until the start of an extensive rebuilding program. In the 6-30-1949 Summary of Equipment the class designations were adjusted into three classes: DER-1a (#0700–#0709), DER-1b (#0710–#0749) and DER-1c (#0750–#0759). The class was rebuilt from 1949 to 1951, replacing the plywood sides, removing the decorative side windows in favor of a steel screen, and several other changes, with only #0740 retaining its original appearance after being rebuilt.

Two DL-109s received a special rebuild c1953 to make them able to "MU" (multiple unit) with more than one other unit; originally, they only had the MU cables on the rear, meaning that only a back-to-back pair could be made. The two special units had cables put on the front so they could be used to make a 3-unit set for longer trains. #0727 had the nose rebuilt with an access door, raising the headlight and changing the contour of the nose.

In the winter of 1953 to 1954 New Haven A-A-A units #0720-0722 with #0721 in the lead could be seen in far northern Maine on the Bangor and Aroostook Railroad, helping haul massive tonnage of potatoes, usually in the now-famous red white and blue "State of Maine" products reefers. These were leased by The BAR.

The DL-109s eventually ran their last miles in the late 1950s in local commuter service around Boston. One special unit was retained through the 1960s in Boston as a power plant; #0716 was converted in late 1958 to produce power for a test third rail in Boston, only having a single 539T prime mover. Eventually #PP716 became the last DL-109 and fell to the scrapper's torch under the Penn Central at Dover Street Yard in Boston, in August 1970.

The DL-109s of the other railroads were primarily scrapped during the 1950s. The Rock Island had rival builder EMD repower their newest, the #621, with dual V12 567B engines but this does not seem to have extended its career greatly. The Chicago and North Western retired its DL-107 in 1954 after it developed a cracked frame after a derailment on a turntable.

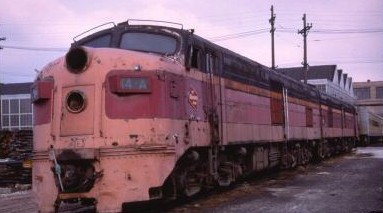
Rebuilt Milwaukee Road DL-107 #14A, "Old Maude," in 1958. Not typical of DL-107 styling, this unit was rebuilt by Milwaukee Road and resembles a contemporary EMD cab unit. Prior to its rebuilt it had the typical styled 3 piece window cab

The units on the Milwaukee logged over 3 million miles by 1953, and were overhauled. The electric motors and prime movers were sent to ALCO for rebuilding, and the shopmen at the Milwaukee Road's Menomonee Valley shops rebuilt the locomotives. They came out of the shops with facelifts, with the addition of EMD bulldog noses, and changed appearance, which made them look like an EMD locomotive. The units then worked on secondary lines to Canton, South Dakota, Green Bay, Wisconsin, and Madison-Chicago trains until retirement; #14B was finally scrapped at Jones Island in Milwaukee in May 1964. None have been preserved.

== Units produced ==
=== A units (cabs) ===
Image	Railroad	Quantity	Road numbers	Model
	Atchison, Topeka and Santa Fe Railway	1	50	DL-107
	Chicago, Milwaukee, St. Paul and Pacific Railroad	2	14A, 14B	DL-107
	Chicago and North Western Railway	1	5007A	DL-107
	Chicago, Rock Island and Pacific Railroad	1	624	DL-103b
	Chicago, Rock Island and Pacific Railroad	1	622	DL-105
	Chicago, Rock Island and Pacific Railroad	2	621, 623	DL-107
	Gulf, Mobile and Ohio Railroad	2	270, 271	DL-105
	Gulf, Mobile and Ohio Railroad	1	272	DL-109
	New York, New Haven and Hartford Railroad	60	0700–0759	DL-109
	Cincinnati, New Orleans & Texas Pacific (Southern Railway)	2	6400, 6401	DL-107
	Southern Railway	1	2904	DL-109

=== B units (cabless boosters) ===
Image	Railroad	Quantity	Road numbers	Model
	Atchison, Topeka and Santa Fe Railway	1	50A	DL-108
	Cincinnati, New Orleans & Texas Pacific (Southern Railway)	2	6425, 6426	DL-108
	Southern Railway	1	2954	DL-110
