= EMD E7 =

American passenger cab diesel locomotive

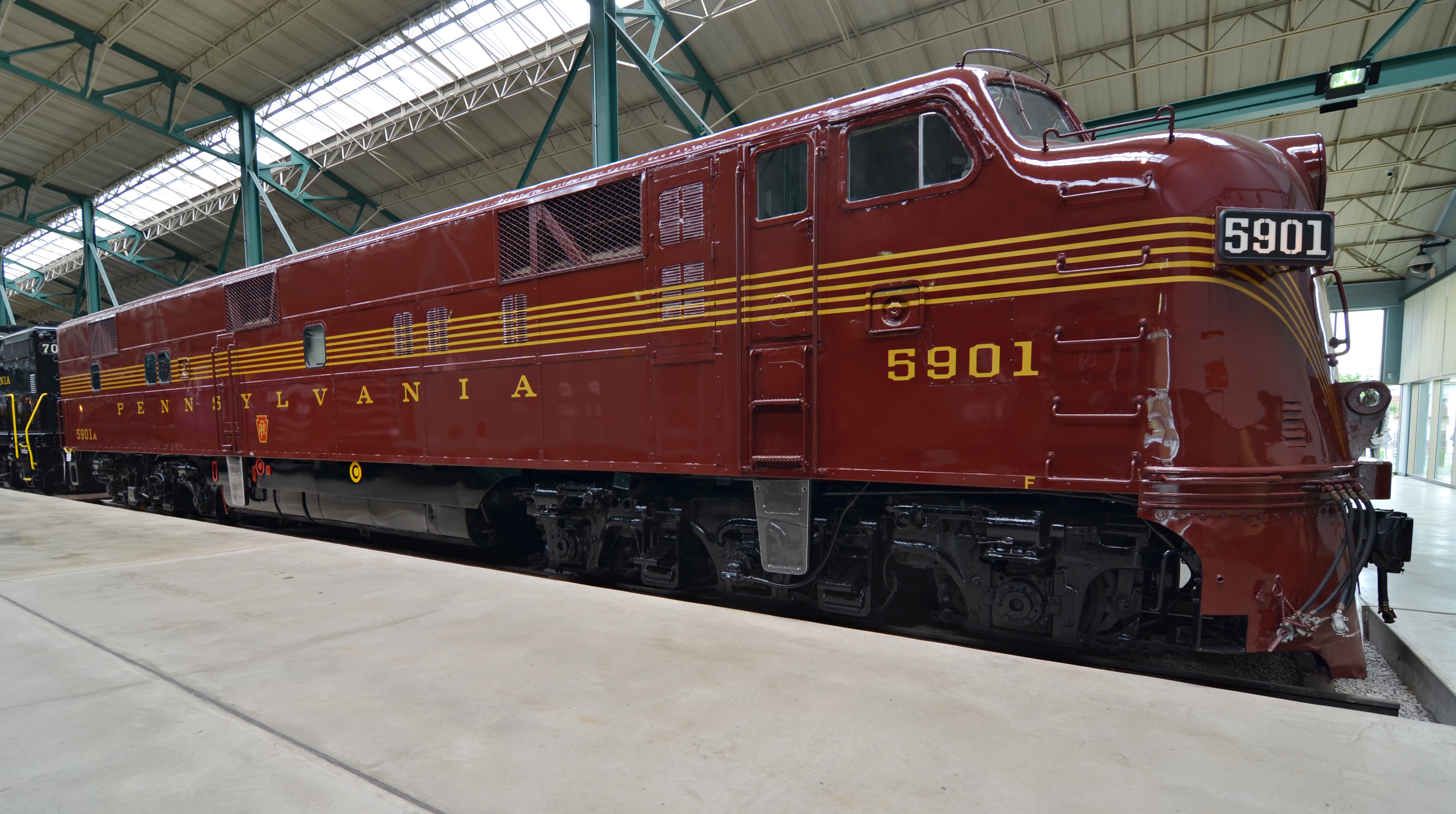
- Pennsylvania Railroad E7A #5901 on display at the Railroad Museum of Pennsylvania in 2015.
Type and origin
- Power type: Diesel-electric
- Builder: General Motors Electro-Motive Division (EMD)
- Model: E7
- Build date: February 1945 – April 1949
- Total produced: 428 A units, 82 B units
Specifications
- Configuration
  - AAR: A1A-A1A
- Gauge: 4 ft 8 1/2 in (1,435 mm)
- Wheel diameter: 36 in (914 mm)
- Minimum curve: 21° (274.37 ft or 83.63 m radius)
- Length: 71 ft (22 m)
- Width: 10 ft 6 1/2 in (3.213 m)
- Height: 14 ft 11 in (4.55 m)
- Loco weight: A unit: 315,000 lb (143,000 kg), B unit: 290,000 lb (130,000 kg)
- Fuel type: Diesel
- Prime mover: (2) EMD 12-567A
- RPM range: 800
- Engine type: V12 Two-stroke diesel
- Aspiration: Mechanical via Roots blower
- Displacement: 6,804 cu in (111.50 L) each
- Generator: (2) EMD D-4
- Traction motors: (4) GM D7 or D17 or D27
- Cylinders: (2) 12
Performance figures
- Maximum speed: 85–117 mph (137–188 km/h)
- Power output: 2,000 hp (1,491 kW) total
- Tractive effort: 56,500 lbf (251,000 N) starting, 31,000 lbf (140,000 N) continuous
Career
- Locale: United States
- Disposition: One preserved on static display, remainder scrapped.

The E7 is a 2,000-horsepower (1,500 kW), A1A-A1A passenger train locomotive built by General Motors' Electro-Motive Division of La Grange, Illinois. 428 cab versions, or E7As, were built from February 1945 to April 1949; 82 booster E7Bs were built from March 1945 to July 1948. (Circa 1953 one more E7A was built by the Los Angeles General Shops of the Southern Pacific by rebuilding an E2A.) The 2,000 hp came from two 12 cylinder model 567A engines. Each engine drove its own electrical generator to power the two traction motors on one truck. The E7 was the eighth model in a line of passenger diesels of similar design known as EMD E-units, and it became the best selling E model upon its introduction.

In profile the front of the nose of an E7A was less slanted than on earlier EMD passenger locomotives, and the E7, E8, and E9 units have been nicknamed “bulldog nose” units. Some earlier units were called “shovel nose” units or “slant nose” units.

== In film ==
A Gulf, Mobile and Ohio Railroad E7A, #103-A, appears at the start and end of the 1967 film In The Heat of the Night.

A Southern Pacific E7A, #6001, is on the point of a train that figures prominently in "The Hitch-Hiker", a popular 1960 episode of the anthology television series, The Twilight Zone, starring Inger Stevens. (According to the narration, Steven's character is said to encounter the train somewhere between Pennsylvania and Tennessee, yet the locomotive's number board shows that the train, #99, is the Coast Daylight, which travelled between Los Angeles and San Francisco.)

In the 2010 miniseries The Pacific, filmed in Melbourne, S313, an example of the similar A16C export model, was painted to resemble Louisville & Nashville Railroad E7A 758 for filming, however it retained the livery for a short while after filming wrapped.

== Surviving example ==
Ex-Pennsylvania Railroad E7A #5901 is preserved as the only surviving example of the E7. This locomotive has been cosmetically restored, and is currently on indoor display at the Railroad Museum of Pennsylvania, in Strasburg, Pennsylvania.

== Original owners ==
A total of 428 cab-equipped lead A units and 82 cabless-booster or B units were built. Approximately thirty railroads purchased A units, B units, or both. The single largest buyer was the Pennsylvania Railroad, which purchased 46 A units and 14 B units. Other significant buyers included the New York Central Railroad (36 A units and 14 B units), Chicago, Burlington and Quincy Railroad (44 A units), Seaboard Air Line Railroad (32 A units and 3 B units), and Atlantic Coast Line Railroad (20 A units and 10 B units).

== See also ==
- List of GM-EMD locomotives
