= EMC AB6 =

Unique Diesel Railroad Locomotive

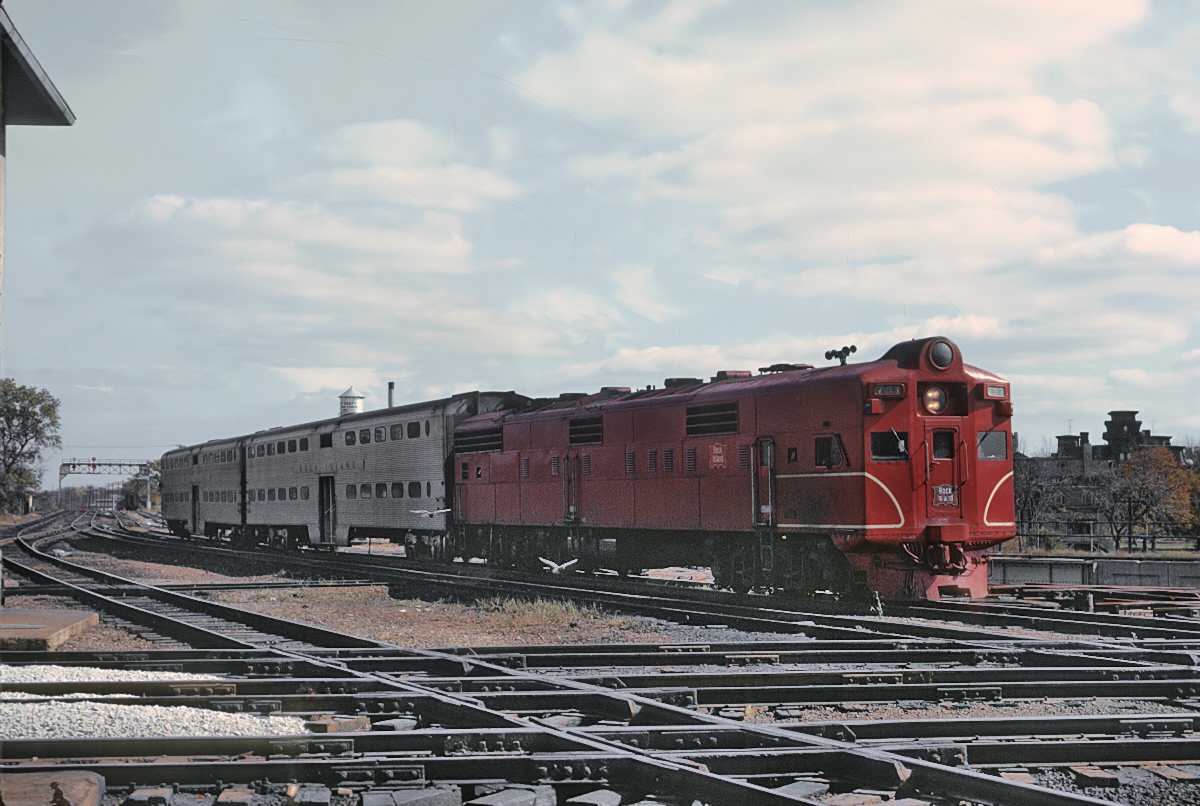
- Rock Island No. 751 at Joliet, Illinois in October 1966
Type and origin
- Power type: Diesel-electric
- Builder: Electro-Motive Corporation (EMC)
- Build date: 1940
- Total produced: 2
Specifications
- Configuration
  - AAR: New: A1A-3; Later: A1A-A1A
- Gauge: 4 ft 8 1/2 in (1,435 mm) standard gauge
- Prime mover: EMC 12-567, 1 off, later 2 off
- Engine type: V12 Two-stroke diesel
- Cylinders: 12
Performance figures
- Power output: New: 1,000 hp (750 kW); Later: 2,000 hp (1,491 kW)
Career
- Operators: Rock Island
- Numbers: 750 and 751
- Delivered: June 1940
- Retired: mid-1970s
- Disposition: Both scrapped 1973–74

The EMC AB6 was a type of diesel locomotive built exclusively for the Chicago, Rock Island and Pacific Railroad (the "Rock Island Line") by General Motors' Electro-Motive Corporation and delivered in June 1940. Two examples were built, numbered #750 and #751. They were built for the Rocky Mountain Rocket passenger train, which travelled as a unified train from Chicago, Illinois, to Limon, Colorado, which then divided. One section went to Colorado Springs, Colorado, and the other to Denver, Colorado. The Rock Island desired a locomotive that could look like an integrated part of the train during the Chicago-Limon portion of the route, and could then be operated independently to take three cars to Colorado Springs. A regular, cab-equipped A-unit could have been purchased, but that would have ruined the streamlined look of the train, so the RI had EMC build a flat-fronted locomotive based on an E-series E6B (B unit) but with an operating cab, headlight, pilot, and other features to enable it to operate as an independent locomotive.

Since the small three- and four-car trains the units would have to haul independently were very light, the AB6 pair were built with only one 1,000 hp EMC 567 V12 engine, and a baggage compartment where the second engine would have been. Later, with increasing trainloads, the baggage compartment was replaced with a second engine.

In 1965, the units had their steam generators replaced with head-end power and were reassigned to push-pull suburban service in the Chicago area. In this form, they lasted until the mid-1970s and were eventually scrapped.
