= EMD E6 =

American diesel-passenger locomotive

EMC E6
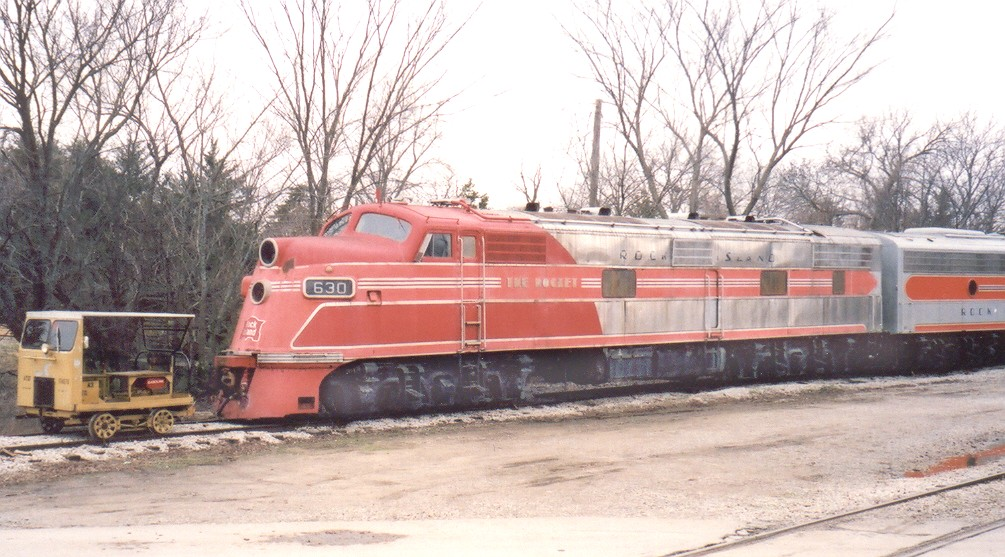
- Rock Island E6A #630, operated by Midland Railway, at Baldwin City, Kansas on November 28, 2004
Type and origin
- Power type: Diesel-electric
- Builder: Electro-Motive Corporation (EMC), known as General Motors Electro-Motive Division (GM-EMD) from 1941 onwards
- Model: E6
- Build date: November 1939 – September 1942
- Total produced: 91 A-units, 26 B-units
Specifications
- Configuration
  - AAR: A1A-A1A
- Gauge: 4 ft 8 1/2 in (1,435 mm)
- Trucks: EMD Blomberg A-1-A passenger
- Wheel diameter: 36 in (914 mm)
- Minimum curve: 23° (250.79 ft or 76.44 m radius)
- Wheelbase: 57 ft 1 in (17.40 m)
- Length: 70 ft 4 in (21.44 m) over coupler pulling faces
- Width: 10 ft 7 in (3.23 m)
- Height: 14 ft 10 in (4.52 m)
- Loco weight: A unit: 311,300 lb (141,203 kg); B unit: 290,000 lb (131,542 kg)
- Prime mover: (2) EMD 12-567
- RPM range: 800
- Engine type: V12 Two-stroke diesel
- Aspiration: Mechanical
- Displacement: 6,804 cu in (111.50 L) each
- Generator: (2) EMD D-4
- Traction motors: (4) EMD D-7
- Cylinders: (2) 12
Performance figures
- Maximum speed: 116 mph (187 km/h)
- Power output: 2,000 hp (1,500 kW) total
- Tractive effort: Starting: 56,500 lbf (251,325 N) @25% Continuous: 31,000 lbf (137,895 N) @11 mph (18 km/h)
Career
- Disposition: Two preserved, remainder scrapped

The EMC E6 is a 2,000-horsepower (1,500 kW), A1A-A1A, streamlined passenger train locomotive manufactured by Electro-Motive Corporation, and its corporate successor, General Motors Electro-Motive Division, of La Grange, Illinois. The cab version, E6A, was manufactured from November 1939 to September 1942; 91 were produced. The booster version, E6B, was manufactured from April 1940 to February 1942; 26 were produced. The 2,000-horsepower (1,500 kW) was achieved by putting two 1,000-horsepower (750 kW), 12-cylinder, model 567 engines in the engine compartment. Each engine drove its own electrical generator to power the traction motors. The E6 was the seventh model in a long line of passenger diesels of similar design known as EMD E-units.

Compared with passenger locomotives made later by EMD, the noses of the E3, E4, E5, and E6 cab units had pronounced slants when viewed from the side. Therefore, these four models have been nicknamed "slant nose" units. Later E models had the "bulldog nose" of the F series.

One interesting E6 variant custom-produced for the Missouri Pacific was the model EMC AA. This was a motorcar-style unit which had only one prime mover and 1,000 horsepower (750 kW), and substituted a baggage compartment where the other diesel V-12 would have been. The Chicago, Rock Island and Pacific owned an equally interesting pair of similar power cars known as the EMC AB6, which were mechanically identical but had boxcabs in blunt noses. These acted as boosters behind conventional E6A models on the Rocky Mountain Rocket train between Chicago and Limon, Colorado, from where the E6A would take the Denver cars north and the AB6 would take the Colorado Springs section of the train south.

== Original owners ==
Image	Railroad	Quantity A units	Quantity B units	Road numbers A units	Road numbers B units	Notes
	Electro-Motive Corporation (demonstrator)	1	—	1940	—	to Seaboard Air Line 3014
	Atlantic Coast Line Railroad	22	5	502–523	750–754	ACL 501 was built as an E3A, wrecked before delivery and rebuilt as an E6A
	Atchison, Topeka and Santa Fe Railway	4	3	12–15	12A, 13A, 15A	
	Baltimore and Ohio Railroad	8	7	52, 57–63	57x–63x	
	Chicago and North Western Railway	4	—	5005A,B, 5006A,B	—	
	Chicago, Rock Island and Pacific Railroad	5	—	627–631	—	
	Florida East Coast Railway	3	1	1003–1005	1051	
	Illinois Central Railroad	5	—	4000–4004	—	
	Kansas City Southern Railway	2	—	4, 5	—	
	Louisville and Nashville Railroad	16	—	450A,B–457A,B	—	
	Milwaukee Road	2	—	15A,B	—	
	Missouri Pacific Railroad	2	2	7002–7003	7002B–7003B	
	Seaboard Air Line Railroad	3	—	3014–3016	—	EMD Demonstrator 1940 became SAL 3014
	Southern Railway	7	4	2800–2802; 2900–2903	2900B–2903B	
	Union Pacific Railroad	6	—	7M1A, 7M2A, 8M1A, 8M2A, 9M1A, 9M2A	—	
	UP-C&NW joint City of Los Angeles	1	2	LA-4	LA-5, LA-6	
	UP-SP-C&NW joint City of San Francisco	1	2	SF-4	SF-5, SF-6	
	Total	91	26			

== Surviving units ==
Two E6 locomotives survive today:

Chicago, Rock Island & Pacific Railroad E6A #630, was operated by the Midland Railway, in Baldwin City, Kansas. RI 630 has since been sold and will become part of a future museum in Manly, Iowa, along with Rock Island E8A 652. Both units have been cosmetically restored but currently are under a mechanical restoration at Mid-America Car in Kansas City, MO as of March 2017.

Louisville and Nashville E6A #770, built as L&N 450B, is located at the Kentucky Railway Museum, in New Haven, Kentucky. This unit is for display only, as it came to the museum without most of its internal parts.

== See also ==
- List of GM-EMD locomotives
