= EMD E8 =

Model of 2250 hp American passenger cab locomotive

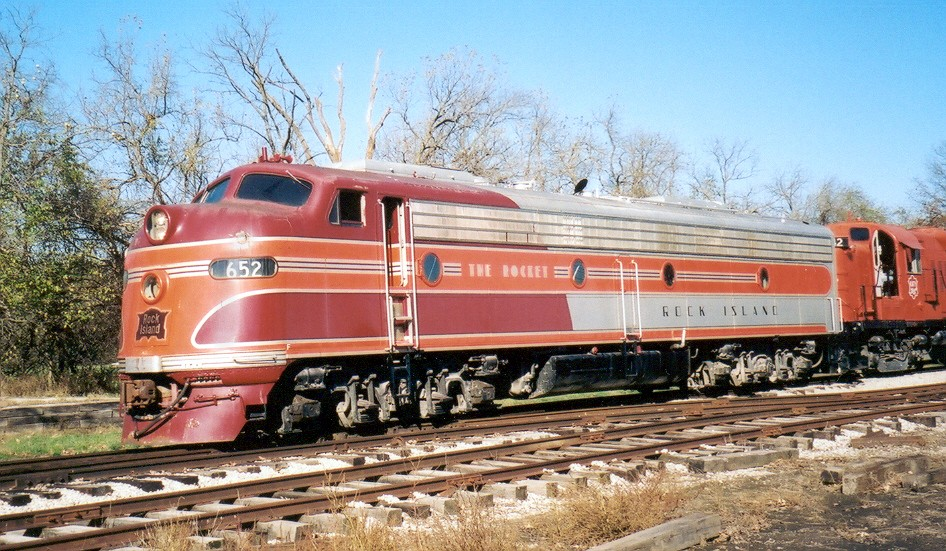
- Rock Island E8 #652, Formerly operated by Midland Railway of Baldwin City, Kansas.
Type and origin
- Power type: Diesel-electric
- Builder: General Motors Electro-Motive Division (EMD)
- Model: E8
- Build date: August 1949 – January 1954
- Total produced: 449 A units, 46 B units
Specifications
- Configuration
  - AAR: A1A-A1A
- Gauge: 4 ft 8 1/2 in (1,435 mm) standard gauge
- Trucks: EMD Blomberg A-1-A passenger
- Wheel diameter: 36 in (914 mm)
- Minimum curve: 21° (274.37 ft or 83.63 m radius)
- Length: 70 ft 3 in (21.41 m)
- Width: 10 ft 7 1/2 in (3.24 m)
- Height: 14 ft 7 in (4.45 m)
- Loco weight: A unit: 315,000 lb (142,882 kg), B unit: 290,000 lb (131,542 kg)
- Prime mover: (2) EMD 12-567B
- Engine type: V12 Two-stroke diesel
- Aspiration: Roots blower
- Displacement: 6,804 cu in (111.50 L) each
- Generator: (2) EMD D-15-A
- Traction motors: (4) GM D-27-B
- Cylinders: (2) 12
Performance figures
- Maximum speed: 85–117 mph (137–188 km/h) depending on gearing
- Power output: 2,250 hp (1,678 kW) total
- Tractive effort: 56,500 lbf (251 kN) starting, 31,000 lbf (140 kN) continuous
Career
- Locale: United States
- Disposition: About 58 preserved, remainder scrapped

The EMD E8 is a 2,250-horsepower (1,678 kW), A1A-A1A passenger-train locomotive built by General Motors' Electro-Motive Division (EMD) of La Grange, Illinois. A total of 449 cab versions, or E8As, were built from August 1949 to January 1954, 446 for the U.S. and 3 for Canada. 46 E8Bs were built from December 1949 to January 1954, all for the U.S. The 2,250 hp came from two 12 cylinder model 567B engines, each driving a generator to power the two traction motors on one truck. The E8 was the ninth model in the line of passenger diesels of similar design known as EMD E-units. Starting in September 1953, a total of 21 E8As were built which used either the 567BC or 567C engines.

In profile the front of the nose of E7, E8, and E9 units is less slanted than earlier EMD units, so E7/8/9s (and their four axle cousins, the F-unit series) have been nicknamed "bulldog nose" units. Earlier E-unit locomotives were nicknamed "slant nose" units. After passenger trains were canceled on the Erie Lackawanna in 1970 (excluding their commuter service, which the State of New Jersey subsidized starting in the late 1960s), the E8s were re-geared for freight and were very reliable for the EL. These units were on freight trains until the early years of Consolidated Railroad Corporation ("Conrail"). Amtrak used 148 E8As, 3 E8AMs, and 5 E8Bs, these all being retired between 1975 and 1985.

Units noted with the designation E8m were rebuilt using components from earlier EMC/EMD locomotives. Externally the units look just like E8s. The difference in horsepower produced in these E8m units is because the older generators are reused.

== Original owners ==
A total of 449 cab-equipped lead A units and 46 cabless-booster or B units were built. (Note: Foster gives a total of 449 without specifying B units.) Approximately thirty railroads purchased A units, B units, or both. The single largest buyer was the Pennsylvania Railroad, which purchased 75 A units. Other significant buyers included the New York Central Railroad (60 A units), Union Pacific Railroad (18 A units and 28 B units), and Chicago, Burlington and Quincy Railroad (40 A units).

== Surviving examples ==
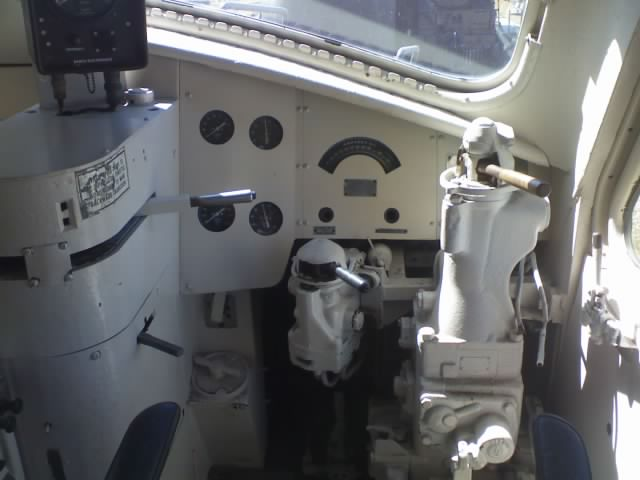
The Engineer / Operator position of an E8A

It is estimated that 58 E8s have survived. The former NYC 4085, preserved at the New York Central Railroad Museum, was the lead locomotive on the final eastbound 20th Century Limited. Another surviving E8 was operated by the Midland Railway, in Baldwin City, Kansas. Privately owned, this unit is ex-Chicago, Rock Island and Pacific Railroad E8A #652 and was used for special events. It and its companion, E6A #630, have been sold to a new museum in Iowa, which will be centered around the Rock Island. Both #630 and #652 have been cosmetically restored to their as delivered appearances, with mechanical work underway to return them to operational condition. New York Central 4097, privately owned, is on display at Merli Manufacturing Company in Duanesburg, New York.

The Monticello Railway Museum owns a former Pennsylvania Railroad E8A. It is currently undergoing restoration, and Monticello plans to paint it up as an Illinois Central E8 to match their collection of former Illinois Central passenger cars.

There are four Southern Railway E8As preserved. Unit #6900 is operational at the North Carolina Transportation Museum in Spencer, North Carolina, while the railway's #6901 is preserved at the Southeastern Railway Museum in Duluth, GA, and recently underwent an operational restoration by Norfolk Southern. These engines have pulled the Southern Crescent and both bear this train's distinct logo. A Southern Railway E8, #6913, is being restored at the Southern Appalachia Railway Museum in Oak Ridge, TN for their Southern excursion train. Yet another, Southern #6914, is nearing the completion of a nearly two-decade-long restoration at the Tennessee Valley Railroad Museum, having been unveiled at the railroad's 2018 "Railfest", resplendent in green and gold complete with "NO&NE" sublettering.

The St Louis, Iron Mountain, & Southern Railway owns former Pennsylvania Railroad E8A #5898. It was previously owned by the Blue Mountain & Reading. It is the main engine used on their tourist train, and it was repainted in 2015.

Union Pacific E8AM #942 is owned by the Southern California Railway Museum, and is occasionally used on their tourist train, usually pulling the museum's small collection of former Union Pacific passenger cars. It carries the designation E8AM from its time in Chicago-area commuter service. After its time on the Union Pacific, #942 was sold to the Chicago and Northwestern, which used it in commuter service. After serving with CNW, the 942 moved on to serve Chicago's RTA. Upon retirement, it was donated to the museum, and subsequently restored to UP colors in 2012. It was rebuilt with a HEP generator which is what gives it the designation E8AM. However, unlike many E units rebuilt for commuter service, it retained its twin EMD 12-567B prime movers.

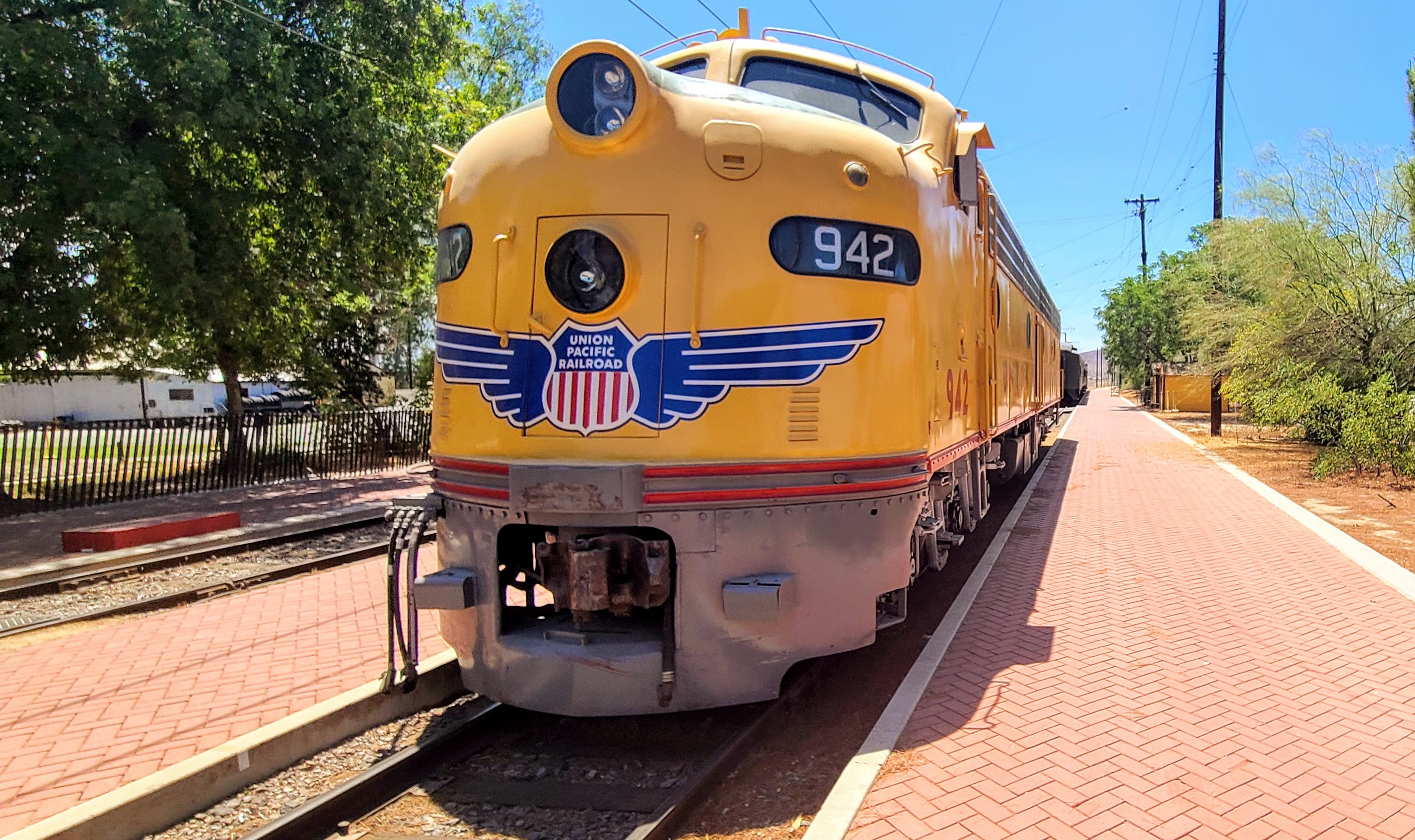
Union Pacific 942 is operational at the Southern California Railway Museum.

Chicago and North Western #5022B, later renumbered to 519 and then used by Metra, is now labeled as "MREX 97", is at the Arizona Railway Museum. It is privately owned and stored on display.

Baltimore & Ohio E8A #92 was kept offsite on a relic track at the B&O Railroad Museum in Baltimore, Maryland for many years after obtaining the unit from Amtrak (DOTX #210). On March 4, 2004, the museum gifted the unit to the West Virginia Railroad Museum. The WVRR Museum partnered with the Durbin & Greenbrier Valley Railroad to undertake restoration of the unit as of February 20, 2024.

Of the units owned by Conrail, three were saved after their freight-service retirement and went on to be refurbished by the Juniata Locomotive Shops in Altoona, PA for use as Conrail's Office Car Special (OCS) until the merger of 1999. One unit went to CSX (never operated), and two were sold off to Bennett Levin, CEO of the Juniata Terminal Company, where they have been overhauled and painted as twin Pennsylvania Railroad E8's. As of 2019, these units are not in operation due to a decision by the owner not to retrofit them with positive train control (PTC).

Another, the former EL 833, was purchased by the New York and Greenwood Lake Railway in 2007. The unit was repainted in its original livery as Erie 833, and was on display for a while on the turntable at Port Jervis, NY. Erie Railroad's E8A No. 833 is stored at Port Jervis station, in Port Jervis, New York, and had occasionally run on excursion trains.

In June 2008, two authentic New York Central E8 units (4080 & 4068) were brought to the Medina Railroad Museum in Western New York.

Pennsylvania Railroad 5702A and 5761A were acquired by the Pennsylvania Railroad T1 Trust from the Fort Wayne Railroad Historical Society in October 2026. The T1 trust intends to run the units along with their duplex locomotive that is currently under construction. Both units are currently under contracted restoration work at the Western Maryland Scenic Railroad.

== See also ==
- List of GM-EMD locomotives
