= EMC AA =

Locomotive class

Type and origin
- Power type: Diesel-electric
- Builder: General Motors Corporation (EMC/GM)
- Build date: August 1940
- Total produced: 1
Specifications
- Configuration
  - AAR: A1A-3
- Gauge: 4 ft 8 1/2 in (1,435 mm)
- Adhesive weight: 97,700 lb (44,316.0 kilograms)
- Loco weight: 247,340 lb (112,191.5 kilograms)
- Fuel capacity: 1,200 US gal (4,500 L; 1,000 imp gal)
- Prime mover: EMC 12-567
- Engine type: V12 diesel
- Cylinders: 12
Performance figures
- Maximum speed: 98 mph (158 km/h)
- Power output: 1,000 hp (746 kW)
- Tractive effort: 24,425 lbf (108.65 kN) at 34 mph (55 km/h)
Career
- Operators: Missouri Pacific Railroad
- Numbers: 7100
- Retired: 1962
- Disposition: Scrapped

AA was a designator used for several different diesel locomotive types custom built by General Motors Corporation EMC/GM with passenger or baggage space in the same body. This locomotive is listed as class AA-6 by R. Craig, and the designation is logical as the locomotive is described as "half an E6" in the Second Diesel Spotter's Guide.

One such was a single locomotive built for the Missouri Pacific Railroad, delivered in August 1940, numbered #7100. MP 7100 was built for service with the Delta Eagle passenger train, which ran between Memphis, Tennessee and Tallulah, Louisiana. Note: Missouri Pacific ordered all their 'E' units with portholes instead of square windows like most of the E series from the EA to E7's. This was the only MoPac unit with square windows (on the baggage door).

Since the two-car train the unit would have to haul was comparatively light, the AA was built with only one 1,000 hp EMD 567 V12 prime mover, and a baggage compartment where the second diesel would have been.

Other EMC/GM locomotives carrying the AA classification include the Pioneer Zephyr, Flying Yankee, and General Pershing Zephyr power units.
