= A-unit =

Type of locomotive

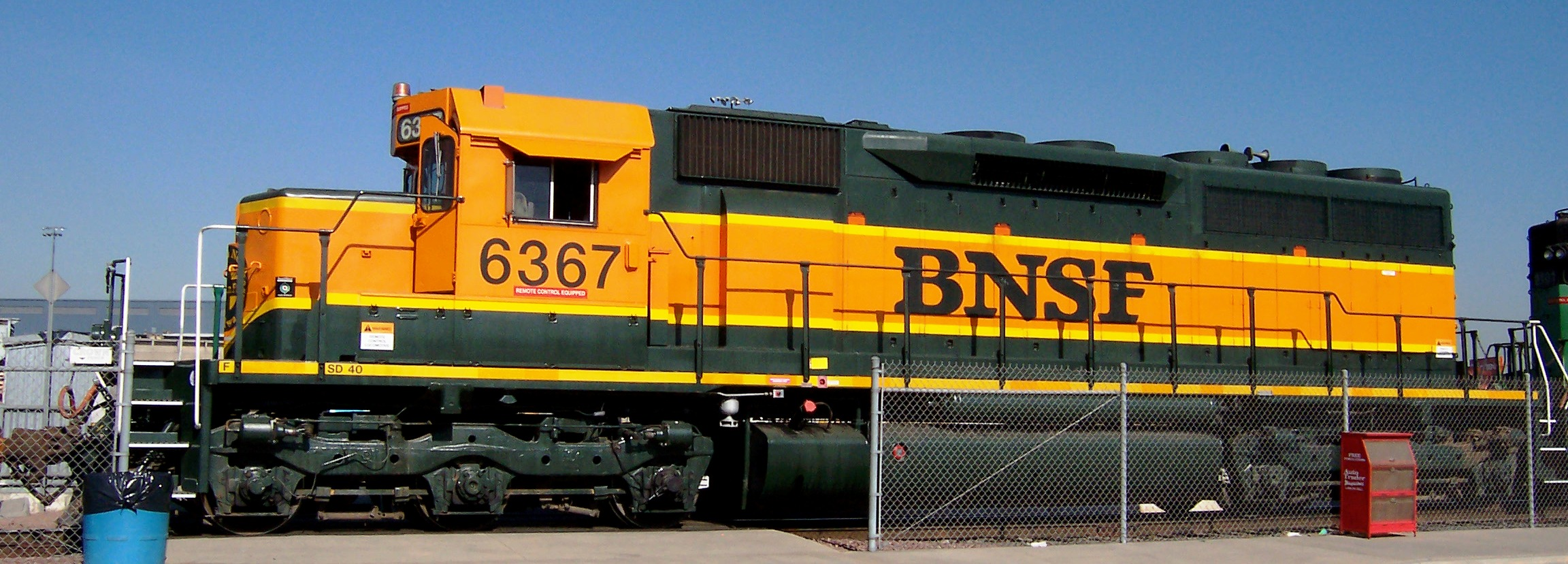
An EMD SD40 A-unit owned by BNSF Railway

An A-unit, in railroad terminology, is a diesel locomotive (or more rarely an electric locomotive) equipped with a driving cab and a control system to control other locomotives in a multiple unit, and therefore able to be the lead unit in a consist of several locomotives controlled from a single position. This terminology is generally used in North America, since only there was it commonplace to build B-units—cabless locomotive units which normally could not lead a train.

== Typical features ==
Typical driving cab features, and therefore A-unit features, include windshields, rectangular side windows, crew seats, heating, and sometimes, radios, air conditioning and toilets. B-units always lack all of these features, except that some EMD F-units have an extra porthole-style side window(s) for a hostler (an employee permitted to move a locomotive in a yard only, not on the road).

== Terminology ==
This terminology has fallen out of use for newer locomotives, since it only really applied to the cab unit style of locomotive. Thus, the term cab unit is used only when an A-unit has a carbody design. Hood unit "road switcher" types were generally equipped with driving cabs and the term "A-unit" was not generally applied to them, although the rare cabless road switchers were still called B-units.

== Conversions ==
In some cases, A-units were converted to B-units. If the unit had been involved in a collision which damaged the cab, it was sometimes more cost-effective to rebuild the unit without the cab. In rarer cases, B-units were converted to A-units. The Chicago and North Western Railway converted several E8B units purchased from the Union Pacific Railroad. The cabs on the rebuilt units were referred to as "Crandall Cabs." The BNSF also experimented with a single GP60B to make it an A-unit by using an Ex-UP SD40-2 cab on a GP60B frame and body, also required to move was the Dynamic blister from the front of the unit to the middle of the unit to make room for the cab.
