= List of Bangor and Aroostook Railroad locomotives =

The Bangor and Aroostook Railroad (BAR) of northern Maine was at the northeastern tip of the United States rail network. Its location offered no bridge traffic between other railways, but required dependable service when winter weather made transportation difficult. Potato loadings peaked during winter months, and a fleet of ten-wheelers built by Manchester Locomotive Works provided reliable service through the early 20th century. Consolidations for the heavier winter freight service were built at other American Locomotive Company (ALCO) plants. Potato traffic remained relatively constant through the Great Depression, and declining bridge traffic revenues which brought insolvency to other railroads were irrelevant to BAR. BAR provided reliable paychecks attracting competent maintenance personnel, and continued to replace older engines with modern steam locomotives through 1945. As less fortunate railroads began replacing their worn-out steam power with modern diesel locomotives, BAR initially purchased a number of used modern steam locomotives from railroads converting to diesel power.

== Steam locomotives ==
Number	Builder	Type	Date	Works number	Notes
1	Manchester Locomotive Works	2-6-0	12/95	1647	ex#27 rebuilt 1915 to 4-4-0 #215
2	Manchester Locomotive Works	2-6-0	12/95	1648	ex#28 rebuilt 1915 to 4-4-0 #216
3	Manchester Locomotive Works	2-6-0	1/96	1649	ex#29 rebuilt 1921 sold to Woodstock Railroad #4
4	Manchester Locomotive Works	2-6-0	1/96	1650	ex#30 rebuilt 1915 to 4-4-0 #214
10	Manchester Locomotive Works	4-6-0	5/94	1620	ex#17 rebuilt 1922 scrapped 8/1929
11	Manchester Locomotive Works	4-6-0	5/94	1621	ex#18 rebuilt 1921 scrapped 8/1929
12	Manchester Locomotive Works	4-6-0	6/94	1622	ex#19 rebuilt 1924 scrapped 12/1930
13	Manchester Locomotive Works	4-6-0	6/94	1623	ex#20 rebuilt 1923 scrapped 8/1929
20	Manchester Locomotive Works	4-6-0	6/99	1699	ex#35 scrapped 12/1936
21	Manchester Locomotive Works	4-6-0	6/99	1700	ex#36 scrapped 12/1936
30	Manchester Locomotive Works	2-6-0	8/99	1709	ex#38 sold 1916
31	Manchester Locomotive Works	2-6-0	8/99	1710	ex#39 sold 1917
32	Manchester Locomotive Works	2-6-0	10/99	1717	ex#40 sold 1916
33	Manchester Locomotive Works	2-6-0	4/99	1697	sold 1917
34	Manchester Locomotive Works	2-6-0	4/99	1698	sold 1913
35	Manchester Locomotive Works	2-6-0	10/99	1718	ex#41 sold 1917
36	Manchester Locomotive Works	2-6-0	11/99	1719	ex#42 sold 1917
50	Manchester Locomotive Works	4-6-0	8/01	1788	sold 8/1928 Belfast and Moosehead Lake Railroad #17
51	Manchester Locomotive Works	4-6-0	8/01	1789	scrapped 1934
52	Manchester Locomotive Works	4-6-0	8/01	1790	sold 8/1928 Belfast and Moosehead Lake Railroad #18
53	Manchester Locomotive Works	4-6-0	8/01	1791	scrapped 1935
54	Manchester Locomotive Works	4-6-0	7/01	1782	ex#44 sold 1/1940 Belfast and Moosehead Lake Railroad #19
55	ALCO Manchester	4-6-0	3/02	26022	scrapped 6/50
56	ALCO Manchester	4-6-0	3/02	26023	scrapped 1933
57	ALCO Manchester	4-6-0	3/02	26024	scrapped 8/1929
58	ALCO Manchester	4-6-0	3/02	26025	scrapped 2/1948
59	ALCO Manchester	4-6-0	3/02	26026	scrapped 1939
60	Manchester Locomotive Works	4-6-0	7/01	1783	ex#45 sold 11/1939 Belfast and Moosehead Lake Railroad #20
61	Manchester Locomotive Works	4-6-0	8/01	1784	ex#46 sold 4/1945 Belfast and Moosehead Lake Railroad #61
62	Manchester Locomotive Works	4-6-0	8/01	1785	ex#47 scrapped 1938
63	Manchester Locomotive Works	4-6-0	8/01	1786	ex#48 scrapped 12/1930
64	Manchester Locomotive Works	4-6-0	8/01	1787	ex#49 scrapped 4/1927
65	ALCO Manchester	4-6-0	5/05	31137	scrapped 6/1950
66	ALCO Manchester	4-6-0	5/05	31138	scrapped 12/1951
67	ALCO Manchester	4-6-0	5/05	31139	scrapped 5/1951
68	ALCO Manchester	4-6-0	5/05	31140	scrapped 5/1952
69	ALCO Manchester	4-6-0	7/05	37518	scrapped 1937
70	ALCO Manchester	4-6-0	5/05	37519	scrapped 1935
71	ALCO Manchester	4-6-0	1/07	41434	ex#78 scrapped 6/1950
72	ALCO Manchester	4-6-0	10/05	38813	scrapped 1929
73	ALCO Manchester	4-6-0	10/05	38814	scrapped 1935
74	ALCO Manchester	4-6-0	10/05	38815	scrapped 1929
75	ALCO Manchester	4-6-0	10/05	38816	scrapped 5/1951
76	ALCO Manchester	4-6-0	10/05	38817	scrapped 1929
77	ALCO Manchester	4-6-0	12/06	41433	scrapped 1931
82	ALCO Manchester	4-6-0	9/07	43362	scrapped 1935
83	ALCO Manchester	4-6-0	9/07	43363	scrapped 1936
84	ALCO Manchester	4-6-0	9/07	43364	scrapped 1936
85	ALCO Manchester	4-6-0	9/07	43365	scrapped 5/1951
86	ALCO Manchester	4-6-0	9/07	43366	scrapped 1935
87	ALCO Manchester	4-6-0	9/07	43367	scrapped 1941
90	ALCO Manchester	4-6-0	11/11	50547	superheated 1926 scrapped 8/1951
91	ALCO Manchester	4-6-0	11/11	50548	superheated 1926 scrapped 12/1951
92	ALCO Manchester	4-6-0	11/11	50549	superheated 1927 rebuilt 1935 scrapped 5/1952
93	ALCO Manchester	4-6-0	11/11	50550	superheated 1917 rebuilt 1939 scrapped 6/1951
94	ALCO Manchester	4-6-0	11/11	50551	superheated 1928 scrapped 12/1951
95	ALCO Manchester	4-6-0	11/11	50552	superheated 1918 scrapped 5/1951
100	ALCO Schenectady	4-8-2	11/29	68218	scrapped 1/53
101	ALCO Schenectady	4-8-2	11/29	68219	scrapped 6/50
102	ALCO Schenectady	4-8-2	11/29	68220	scrapped 6/50
103	ALCO Schenectady	4-8-2	11/29	68221	scrapped 1/53
104	ALCO Schenectady	4-8-2	10/30	68525	scrapped 6/50
105	ALCO Schenectady	4-8-2	10/30	68526	scrapped 6/50
106	ALCO Schenectady	4-8-2	10/30	68527	scrapped 1/53
107	ALCO Schenectady	4-8-2	10/35	68705	scrapped 6/50
108	ALCO Schenectady	4-8-2	10/35	68706	scrapped 1/53
109	ALCO Schenectady	4-8-2	2/45	73055	scrapped 1/53
120	ALCO Schenectady	4-8-2	7/29	67987	ex- New York, Ontario and Western Railway #452 purchased 6/1945 scrapped 6/1949
121	ALCO Schenectady	4-8-2	7/29	67989	ex- New York, Ontario and Western Railway #454 purchased 6/1945 scrapped 6/1949
122	ALCO Schenectady	4-8-2	7/29	67994	ex- New York, Ontario and Western Railway #459 purchased 6/1945 scrapped 6/1949
123	ALCO Schenectady	4-8-2	7/29	67995	ex- New York, Ontario and Western Railway #460 purchased 6/1945 scrapped 6/1949
124	ALCO Schenectady	4-8-2	7/29	67990	ex- New York, Ontario and Western Railway #455 purchased 6/1945 scrapped 2/1948
140	ALCO Rhode Island	4-6-0	10/06	41519	superheated 1916 scrapped 3/1947
141	ALCO Rhode Island	4-6-0	10/06	41520	superheated 1915 scrapped 6/1950
142	ALCO Rhode Island	4-6-0	10/06	41521	superheated 1915 scrapped 5/1951
170	ALCO Rhode Island	2-8-0	3/07	41522	scrapped 5/51
171	ALCO Rhode Island	2-8-0	3/07	41523	scrapped 6/49
172	ALCO Rhode Island	2-8-0	3/07	41524	scrapped 5/51
180	ALCO Schenectady	2-8-0	10/14	54944	wrecked 3/45
181	ALCO Schenectady	2-8-0	10/14	54945	scrapped 8/51
182	ALCO Schenectady	2-8-0	10/14	54946	scrapped 8/51
183	ALCO Schenectady	2-8-0	10/14	54947	scrapped 8/51
184	ALCO Schenectady	2-8-0	10/14	54948	scrapped 8/51
185	ALCO Schenectady	2-8-0	9/16	56742	scrapped 8/51
186	ALCO Schenectady	2-8-0	1/21	62626	scrapped 5/51
187	ALCO Schenectady	2-8-0	1/21	62627	scrapped 3/47
188	ALCO Schenectady	2-8-0	1/21	62628	scrapped 6/50
189	ALCO Schenectady	2-8-0	1/21	62629	scrapped 5/51
190	ALCO Schenectady	2-8-0	1/21	62630	scrapped 5/51
191	ALCO Schenectady	2-8-0	1/21	62631	scrapped 5/51
192	ALCO Schenectady	2-8-0	11/24	65970	scrapped 6/50
193	ALCO Schenectady	2-8-0	11/24	65971	scrapped 8/51
194	ALCO Schenectady	2-8-0	11/24	65972	scrapped 8/51
195	ALCO Schenectady	2-8-0	11/24	65973	scrapped 5/51
196	Baldwin Locomotive Works	2-8-0	3/13	39409	ex-Boston and Maine Railroad #2684 purchased 8/1946 scrapped 6/50
197	ALCO Schenectady	2-8-0	3/13	53253	ex-Boston and Maine Railroad #2692 purchased 8/1946 scrapped 12/47
200	Grant Locomotive Works	4-4-0	1876		ex-Patten and Sherman Railroad #1 acquired 1901 scrapped 1908
201	Manchester Locomotive Works	4-4-0	5/84	1195	ex-Bangor and Piscataquis Railroad #5 sold 1913
202	Manchester Locomotive Works	4-4-0	1/88	1368	ex-Bangor and Piscataquis Railroad #8 scrapped 1911
203	Manchester Locomotive Works	4-4-0	9/93	1596	ex#13 rebuilt 1921 scrapped 11/1930
204	Manchester Locomotive Works	4-4-0	9/93	1597	ex#14 rebuilt 1919 scrapped 2/1941
205	Manchester Locomotive Works	4-4-0	10/93	1598	ex#15 scrapped 1914
206	Manchester Locomotive Works	4-4-0	11/93	1617	ex#16 rebuilt 1920 sold 1940
207	Manchester Locomotive Works	4-4-0	9/94	1624	ex#21 rebuilt 1920 sold 1941
208	Manchester Locomotive Works	4-4-0	10/94	1625	ex#22 scrapped 7/1923
209	Manchester Locomotive Works	4-4-0	1/84	1172	ex-Bangor and Piscataquis Railroad #7 scrapped 1914
210	Manchester Locomotive Works	4-4-0	6/93	1592	ex#9 rebuilt 1919 sold 1936
211	Manchester Locomotive Works	4-4-0	7/93	1593	ex#10 rebuilt 1919 sold 11/1927 Belfast and Moosehead Lake Railroad #16
212	Manchester Locomotive Works	4-4-0	8/93	1594	ex#11 scrapped 1937
213	Manchester Locomotive Works	4-4-0	8/93	1595	ex#12 sold 9/1936 Belfast and Moosehead Lake Railroad 2nd #16
214	Manchester Locomotive Works	4-4-0	1/96	1650	rebuilt from 2-6-0 #4 1915 scrapped 1923
215	Manchester Locomotive Works	4-4-0	12/95	1647	rebuilt from 2-6-0 #1 1915 scrapped 1924
216	Manchester Locomotive Works	4-4-0	12/95	1648	rebuilt from 2-6-0 #2 1915 scrapped 1924
220	Manchester Locomotive Works	4-4-0	10/95	1645	ex#31 scrapped 1923
221	Manchester Locomotive Works	4-4-0	10/95	1646	ex#32 scrapped 6/1924
230	Manchester Locomotive Works	4-6-0	2/95	1629	ex#23 scrapped 7/33
231	Manchester Locomotive Works	4-6-0	3/95	1630	ex#24 scrapped 8/25
232	Manchester Locomotive Works	4-6-0	5/95	1635	ex#25 scrapped 7/24
233	Manchester Locomotive Works	4-6-0	5/95	1636	ex#26 scrapped 7/23
234	ALCO Manchester	4-6-0	10/07	43369	scrapped 1926
235	ALCO Manchester	4-6-0	10/07	43370	scrapped 1926
240	ALCO Manchester	4-6-0	1/02	26742	ex#60 scrapped 1928
241	ALCO Manchester	4-6-0	1/02	26743	ex#61 scrapped 1930
242	ALCO Manchester	4-6-0	1/02	26744	ex#62 rebuilt 1935 scrapped 11/50
243	ALCO Manchester	4-6-0	1/07	41435	ex#79 rebuilt 1935 scrapped 8/51
250	ALCO Schenectady	4-6-2	8/27	67422	scrapped 5/53
251	ALCO Schenectady	4-6-2	8/27	67423	scrapped 1953
252	ALCO Schenectady	4-6-2	8/27	67424	scrapped 3/45
253	ALCO Schenectady	4-6-2	8/27	67425	scrapped 12/53
254	ALCO Schenectady	4-6-2	8/27	67426	scrapped 12/53
300	Manchester Locomotive Works	0-4-0	2/97	1656	ex#37 sold 1917
310	Manchester Locomotive Works	0-6-0	1/00	1726	ex#43 sold 1917
311	Manchester Locomotive Works	0-6-0	7/01	1766	ex#54 sold 1916
320	ALCO Manchester	0-6-0	3/05	31135	ex#63 scrapped 1935
321	ALCO Manchester	0-6-0	3/05	31136	ex#64 scrapped 1935
322	ALCO Manchester	0-6-0	7/05	37520	ex#71 scrapped 1937
323	ALCO Manchester	0-6-0	1/07	41431	ex#80 scrapped 1935
324	ALCO Manchester	0-6-0	1/07	41432	ex#81 scrapped 1936
325	ALCO Manchester	0-6-0	6/08	43368	scrapped 1937
330	ALCO Schenectady	0-8-0	11/28	67669	scrapped 8/1951
335	ALCO Schenectady	0-8-0	9/22	63439	ex- Boston and Maine Railroad #614 purchased 2/1946 scrapped 6/1950
336	ALCO Schenectady	0-8-0	9/22	63448	ex- Boston and Maine Railroad #623 purchased 2/1946 scrapped 6/1949
337	ALCO Schenectady	0-8-0	9/22	63454	ex- Boston and Maine Railroad #629 purchased 2/1946 scrapped 6/1950
338	ALCO Schenectady	0-8-0	9/22	63436	ex- Boston and Maine Railroad #611 purchased 2/1946 scrapped 6/1950
340	ALCO Schenectady	0-8-0	11/31	68599	scrapped 5/53
341	ALCO Schenectady	0-8-0	11/31	68600	scrapped 5/53
400	ALCO Schenectady	2-8-0	11/37	69022	scrapped 7/56
401	ALCO Schenectady	2-8-0	11/37	69023	scrapped 12/53
402	ALCO Schenectady	2-8-0	11/37	69024	scrapped 8/51
403	ALCO Schenectady	2-8-0	11/37	69025	scrapped 7/56
404	ALCO Schenectady	2-8-0	11/37	69026	scrapped 12/53
405	ALCO Schenectady	2-8-0	3/45	73054	scrapped 12/53

== Diesel locomotives ==
After ALCO's Black Maria demonstrator failed to meet expectations while testing on the BAR, the company purchased Electro-Motive Diesel (EMD) E7As for passenger service, NW2 yard switchers, F3A-B-A multiple units for heavy freight service, and unusual BL2s for branch line freight service in the late 1940s. After observing their performance, BAR sold the F3B units and purchased more flexible EMD GP7s for regular service. Steam locomotives were initially retained to meet the peak winter freight loads; but these were replaced by EMD GP9s seasonally leased to the Pennsylvania Railroad to handle summer ore traffic from the Great Lakes. BAR purchased the first EMD GP38s to replace its least satisfactory first-generation diesels prior to loss of the potato shipping business. Subsequent sale of their refrigerator car fleet idled the mechanical refrigeration maintenance shop force until BAR began purchasing and rebuilding used locomotives. Rebuilt locomotives were leased or sold to other railroads, and the rebuilding efforts preserved several earlier models for subsequent purchase by museums and heritage railways.

Number	Builder	Type	Date	Works number	Notes
10	EMD	E7A	4/49	8417	ex BAR #700 renumbered soon after arrival, re-geared for freight service 1961, and repainted BAR Freight blue. Noted for pulling the named passenger train "Aroostook Flyer" from Bangor to Van Buren, ME. Traded to EMD 1967 towards a New GP38.
10	General Electric	65-ton	11/50	30806	ex- Fraser Papers #6 purchased 1972 sold 1974
11	EMD	E7A	4/49	8615	ex BAR #701 renumbered soon after arrival, re-geared for freight service 1961, and repainted BAR Freight blue, Noted for Pulling the named passenger train "Potatoland Special" a sleeper from Bangor to Van Buren, ME. Traded to EMD 1967, towards a New GP38.
20	EMD	NW2	4/49	8157	ex#800 sold 1970 Philadelphia, Bethlehem & New England #26
20	Montreal Locomotive Works	S-3	3/54	76434	ex- Fraser Papers #7 purchased 1972 sold 1975
20	EMD	GP7	1952		ex-Santa Fe Railroad purchased 1991
21	EMD	NW2	4/49	8158	ex#801 sold 1970 Philadelphia, Bethlehem & New England #28
21	EMD	GP7	1952		ex-Santa Fe Railroad purchased 1991
22	EMD	NW2	4/49	8159	ex#802 sold 1967 Republic Steel #906
22	EMD	GP7	1952		ex-Santa Fe Railroad purchased 1991
23	EMD	NW2	4/49	8160	ex#803 sold 1967 Republic Steel #907
23	EMD	GP7	1952		ex-Santa Fe Railroad #2206 purchased 1991
24	EMD	GP7	1952		ex-Santa Fe Railroad #2023 purchased 1991
30	General Electric		1936	11785	ex- New Haven Railroad #0901 purchased 1952 traded to EMD 3/66
30	EMD	SW9	3/51	14103	ex- Pittsburgh and Lake Erie Railroad #8935 purchased 1972 sold 1975
31	General Electric		1936	11786	ex- New Haven Railroad #0902 purchased 1952 scrapped 1957
31	EMD	SW9	3/51	14102	ex- Pittsburgh and Lake Erie Railroad #8934 purchased 1972 sold 1975
32	General Electric		1936	11787	ex- New Haven Railroad #0903 purchased 1952 scrapped 1965
32	EMD	SW9	3/51	14104	ex- Pittsburgh and Lake Erie Railroad #8936 purchased 1972
33	General Electric		1936	11788	ex- New Haven Railroad #0904 purchased 1952 scrapped 1962
33	EMD	SW9	3/51	14099	ex- Pittsburgh and Lake Erie Railroad #8931 purchased 1972
34	General Electric		1936	11789	ex- New Haven Railroad #0905 purchased 1952 traded to EMD 3/66
34	EMD	SW9	3/51	14106	ex- Pittsburgh and Lake Erie Railroad #8938 purchased 1972
35	EMD	SW9	3/51	14101	ex- Pittsburgh and Lake Erie Railroad #8933 purchased 1972
36	EMD	SW9	3/51	14108	ex- Pittsburgh and Lake Erie Railroad #8940 purchased 1972
37	EMD	SW9	2/51	14110	ex- Pittsburgh, Chartiers and Youghiogheny Railroad #3 purchased 1972 sold 1975
38	EMD	SW9	12/52	17224	ex- Pittsburgh, Chartiers and Youghiogheny Railroad #4 purchased 1972 sold 1975
39	EMD	SW9	9/53	18710	ex- Pittsburgh, Chartiers and Youghiogheny Railroad #5 purchased 1972 sold 1975
40	EMD	F3A	10/47	5170	ex#500 scrapped 3/84
41	EMD	F3A	10/47	5171	ex#501 traded to EMD 9/67 towards the 3rd GP38 for Sept, 1967
42	EMD	F3A	10/47	5172	ex#502, repainted original #502 and used as Heritage Unit for many years. Runs, Traction motors are out, but stored with it, in storage, Maine as of 2013 ( Oldest F3-A)
43	EMD	F3A	10/47	5173	ex#503 traded to EMD 9/67
44	EMD	F3A	5/48	5174	ex#504 sold 1986 Tri-State Historical, currently Restored as Lackawanna #663 and operates in PA, at Steamtown with sister #46 (ex 506) ( Oldest operating F3A with sister #664 )
45	EMD	F3A	5/48	5175	ex#505 scrapped 3/84
46	EMD	F3A	5/48	5180	ex#506 sold 1986 Anthracite Railroads Historical Society minus engine, generator and other major components. Restored by ARHS using components from ATSF CF7 #2649, now in Lackawanna paint as # 664. Works with Sister # 44 ( ex 504) in PA. at Steamtown ( Oldest operating F3A with Sister #663)
47	EMD	F3A	5/48	5181	ex#507 rebuilt #49 in 1973 scrapped 11/84 at Derby shops.
50	EMD	BL2	3/49	8161	ex#550 scrapped 4/84
51	EMD	BL2	3/49	8162	ex#551 lightened by 10 tons for service on the Greenville Branch scrapped 1993
52	EMD	BL2	3/49	8163	ex#552 As of 2014 operates as SNC #52 in passenger service pulling Super Domeliners at the Saratoga & North Creek Railroad, in NY
53	EMD	BL2	3/49	8164	ex#553 wrecked 9/1972
54	EMD	BL2	3/49	8165	ex#554 sold 1986 Wayne County, Pennsylvania
55	EMD	BL2	3/49	8166	ex#555 scrapped 1/84
56	EMD	BL2	4/49	8616	ex#556 lightened by 10 tons for service on the Greenville Branch, currently under restoration at Saratoga & North Creek Railway in NY
57	EMD	BL2	4/49	ex#557 repainted original paint scheme in 1980 and named American Railfan.	Currently on Static Display, Indoors, at the Cole transportation Museum in Bangor, ME., minus traction motors.
60	EMD	GP7	11/50	9933	ex#560
61	EMD	GP7	11/50	9934	ex#561 scrapped 1991
62	EMD	GP7	11/50	9935	ex#562 wrecked 1985
63	EMD	GP7	11/50	9936	ex#563
64	EMD	GP7	11/50	9937	ex#564
65	EMD	GP7	11/50	9938	ex#565
66	EMD	GP7	11/50	9939	ex#566 sold 1991 last seen at MNNR in Minnesota in 2004, scrapped in 2005-6
67	EMD	GP7	11/50	9940	ex#567
68	EMD	GP7	11/50	9941	ex#568 to MMA
69	EMD	GP7	11/50	9942	ex#569
70	EMD	GP7	11/50	9943	ex#570
71	EMD	GP7	11/50	9944	ex#571 to ACWR #710
72	EMD	GP7	8/52	9945	ex#572 sold 1991 to MNNR
73	EMD	GP7	8/52	9946	ex#573 painted Bicentennial red, white & blue in 1975, renumbered 1776 and named Jeremiah O'Brien TO MNNR
74	EMD	GP7	8/52	9947	ex#574 sold 1991 to MNNR
75	EMD	GP7	8/52	9948	ex#575
76	EMD	GP9	6/54	19553	Sold to the Green Mountain Railroad as #1848 in the 1980s and later sold to the Belvidere and Delaware River Railway in August 1997.
77	EMD	GP9	6/54	19554	became California Western Railroad # 67 in 1998
78	EMD	GP9	6/54	19555	
79	EMD	GP9	6/54	19556	to MMA # 79
80	EMD	GP9	6/54	19557	
81	EMD	GP38	2/66	31213	renumbered #361
82	EMD	GP38	2/66	31214	renumbered #358
83	EMD	GP38	3/67	33050	renumbered #357
84	EMD	GP38	3/67	33051	renumbered #365
85	EMD	GP38	3/67	33052	renumbered #350
86	EMD	GP38	9/67	33199	renumbered #352
87	EMD	GP38	9/67	33200	renumbered #359
88	EMD	GP38	9/67	33201	renumbered #360
90	EMD	GP38	12/67	7076-3	ex-Conrail #7662 purchased 1983 renumbered #354
91	EMD	GP38	12/67	7076-4	ex-Conrail #7663 purchased 1983 renumbered #362
92	EMD	GP38	12/67	7076-5	ex-Conrail #7664 purchased 1983 renumbered #355
93	EMD	GP38	1969	7151-1	ex-Conrail #7661 purchased 1983 renumbered #353
94	EMD	GP38	1969	7154-2	ex-Conrail #7666 purchased 1983 renumbered #366
95	EMD	GP38	1967		ex-Missouri Pacific Railroad renumbered #363
96	EMD	GP38	1967		ex-Missouri Pacific Railroad renumbered #356
97	EMD	GP38	1969		ex-Missouri Pacific Railroad renumbered #364
98	EMD	GP38	1969		ex-Missouri Pacific Railroad renumbered #351
600	EMD	F3B	10/47	5176	sold to Pennsylvania Railroad #9530B
601	EMD	F3B	10/47	5177	sold to Pennsylvania Railroad #9532B
602	EMD	F3B	5/48	5178	sold to Pennsylvania Railroad #9534B
603	EMD	F3B	5/48	5179	sold to Pennsylvania Railroad #9536B
