= Maine Central class H 4-4-0 =

Maine Central Class H
Type and origin
- Power type: Steam
- Builder: ALCO
- Build date: 1898
- Total produced: 13
Specifications
- Configuration
  - Whyte: 4-4-0
  - UIC: 2'B
- Gauge: 4 ft 8 1/2 in (1,435 mm)
- Leading dia.: 30 in (762 mm)
- Driver dia.: 62 in (1,575 mm)
- Wheelbase: 23 ft 5 in (7.14 m)
- Length: 56 ft 3 in (17.15 m) including tender
- Height: 14 ft (4.27 m)
- Loco weight: 127,000 lb (57.6 tonnes)
- Total weight: 229,000 lb (103.9 tonnes)
- Fuel type: Coal
- Fuel capacity: 9 t
- Water cap.: 5,000 US gal (19 m^{3})
- Cylinders: Two
- Cylinder size: 18 in × 24 in (457 mm × 610 mm)
Performance figures
- Tractive effort: 19,200 lbf (85.4 kN)
Career
- Retired: 1916-1921
- Scrapped: 1916-1921

Maine Central Railroad Class H locomotives were intended for branch line passenger service. They were of 4-4-0 wheel arrangement in the Whyte notation, or "2'B" in UIC classification . Built by the American Locomotive Company's (ALCO) Manchester in 1898 the last were completed at ALCO's Schenectady, New York plant in 1898 all were scrapped between 1916 and 1921 . None of the Maine Central Class H 4-4-0 were preserved .
