= Hoosier Valley Railroad Museum =

Railroad museum in North Judson, Indiana

Coordinates: 41.220228°N 86.773303°W

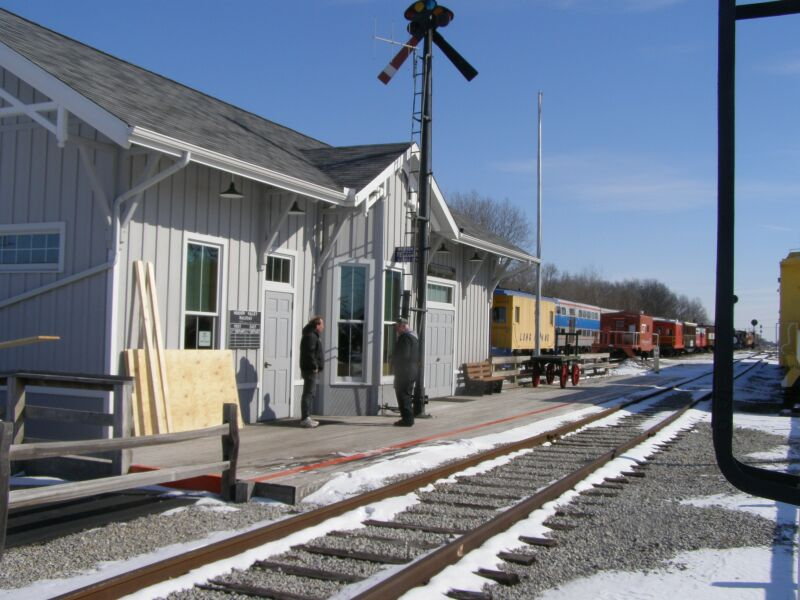

Overview
- Headquarters: North Judson, Indiana
- Reporting mark: HVRM
- Locale: Indiana
- Dates of operation: 1988–present

Technical
- Track gauge: 4 ft 8 1/2 in (1,435 mm) standard gauge

Other
- Website: https://www.hoosiervalley.org/

The Hoosier Valley Railroad Museum (reporting mark HVRM) is a railroad museum located in North Judson, Indiana. It owns a variety of historic railroad equipment and operates seasonal excursions from North Judson to English Lake, Indiana

== Overview ==
The Hoosier Valley Railroad Museum was founded in 1988, as the Miami County Steam Locomotive Association, Inc. In 1961, the organization was gifted C&O 2-8-4 Kanawha, by the Chesapeake and Ohio Railway. No. 2789 was placed on static display in West Side Park in Peru, Indiana, where it would reside for the next 2 decades. In 1985, the organization reformed and decided to restore 2789 to operating condition. In 1989, the locomotive was moved to North Judson and restoration work began. However, the Miami County Steam Locomotive Association abandoned plans to restore it operating condition and changed its name to the Hoosier Valley Railroad Museum in 1992.

The first railroad in town was the Chicago and Cincinnati Railroad Company constructed from Logansport to Valparaiso, Indiana, from 1858 through 1861. In 1865 it merged with the Chicago & Great Eastern Railway Company. Later, the line was purchased by the Pennsylvania Railroad. The town had been called Brantwood, then changed to North Judson. The second railroad in town was the Indiana, Illinois and Iowa Railroad, the 3I route. It ran from Streator, Illinois, to North Judson. Begun in 1881 it reached South Bend, Indiana, in 1894. Later it was known as the New York Central Railroad. The third line through town was the Chicago and Atlantic Railroad, built in 1881 through 1883. It was absorbed by the Erie Railroad. In 1902 the Cincinnati, Richmond and Muncie Chesapeake & Ohio Railroad was built. It later merged with the Chesapeake and Ohio Railway. At one time, a significant portion of the working population in North Judson was employed by one of the railroad companies in town. The town once hosted four major rail lines including the Chesapeake & Ohio, Erie, New York Central and Pennsylvania. North Judson had as many as 125 trains each day.

=== Museum ===
The Hoosier Valley Railroad Museum is located at a former Erie Railroad facility. The museum is open Saturdays all year with train rides also available from May to October. The collection has a variety of historic freight rolling stock, including Chesapeake and Ohio Railway #2789, a 2-8-4 Kanawha type steam locomotive.

== Equipment ==
=== Locomotives ===
Locomotive details
Number	Image	Type	Model	Built	Builder	Status	Description
1		Steam	0-4-4T	1908	Baldwin Locomotive Works	Departed Museum	Built for the Bock Lumber Company. Sold to B.J. Pollard of Detroit, Michigan in 1965, moved to Maryland in the 1970s or 80s. Sold to private owner and relocated to Illinois. Restored to operating condition by Kloke Locomotive Works and moved to Hoosier Valley Railroad Museum in 2021. The locomotive departed the museum in September 2026.
2789		Steam	2-8-4	1947	American Locomotive Company	Stored	Built for the Chesapeake and Ohio Railway. Donated by C&O to Peru, Indiana and placed on display in West side Park in 1961. Acquired by HVRM in 1988, and moved to North Judson in 1989. To be restored to operating condition, but plans fell through.
11		Diesel	95 Tonner	1952	General Electric	Operational	Built for the Interlake Iron Corporation. Sold by Interlake Iron Corporation to Acme Steel. Donated to Hoosier Valley Railroad Museum by Acme Steel in 1995.
DS-50		Diesel	SW-1	1940	Electro-Motive Diesel	Undergoing restoration	Built for the Monon Railroad. Purchased by private owner in 1989 and moved to ITM in 1989. Used for ITM's Caboose Trains from the 2000s to 2018, cab destroyed on route to Logansport, Indiana. Moved to the Hoosier Valley Railroad Museum in 2021, currently undergoing restoration to operating condition.
52		Diesel	EMD BL2	1949	Electro-Motive Diesel	Operational	Built for the Bangor and Aroostook Railroad. Sold to Iowa Pacific Holdings in the 2010s, Resold to Saratoga and North Creek Railway in 2011. Operated by SNC from 2011 to 2018. Sold to private owner in 2021, moved to Hoosier Valley Railroad Museum. Restored by HVRM from 2021 to 2023.
56		Diesel	EMD BL2	1949	Electro-Motive Diesel	Stored	Built for the Bangor and Aroostook Railroad. Sold to Iowa Pacific Holdings in the 2010s, Resold to Saratoga and North Creek Railway in 2011. Operated by SNC from 2011 to 2018. Sold to private owner in 2021, moved to Hoosier Valley Railroad Museum. Awaiting restoration.
310		Diesel	S-1	1947	American Locomotive Company	Operational	Built for the Erie Railroad, to Erie-Lackawanna Railroad in 1960. Donated to Hoosier Valley Railroad Museum by Silcott Railway Equipment Company in 1997.
467		Diesel	S-1	1950	American Locomotive Company	Stored	Built for the Long Island Railroad.
509		Diesel	44-Tonner	1941	Whitcomb Locomotive Works	Display	Built for Day and Zimmerman and numbered 4-44. Donated to the Hoosier Valley Railroad Museum by the Port Of Indiana in 1988.
814		Diesel	EMD SD9	1959	Electro-Motive Diesel	Operational	Built for Duluth, Missabe & Iron Range Railway and numbered 162. Rebuilt by the DM&IR in 1990, renumbered 314. Sold by DM&IR to Elgin, Joliet & Eastern in 1993, renumbered 814. Sold by EJ&E to Indiana Boxcar Corporation, resold to Chesapeake and Indiana Railroad. Sold by Chesapeake and Indiana to private owner. Leased to Hoosier Valley Railroad Museum in 2021 or 2022.
818		Diesel	EMD SD9	1959	Electro-Motive Diesel	Operational	Built for Duluth, Missabe & Iron Range Railway and numbered 172. Rebuilt by the DM&IR in 1990, renumbered 318. Sold by DM&IR to Elgin, Joliet & Eastern in 1993, renumbered 818. Sold by EJ&E to Indiana Boxcar Corporation, resold to Chesapeake and Indiana Railroad. Donated to Hoosier Valley Railroad Museum by Chesapeake and Indiana Railroad in 2021.
5332		Diesel	65-Tonner	1942	H.K. Porter	Display	Built for the U.S. Army. Sold by U.S. Army to the University of Notre Dame, used at Notre Dame's coal fired power plant. Donated to Hoosier Valley Railroad Museum by University of Notre Dame in 2013.

=== Passenger Cars ===
Passenger car details
Number	Image	Type	Built	Builder	Status	Description
4		Coach	1926	Pullman Standard	Stored	Built for the Chicago, South Shore & South Bend Railroad, Stored by HVRM for the South Shoreline Museum Project.
31		Coach	1929	Pullman Standard	Stored	Built for the Chicago, South Shore & South Bend Railroad, Stored by HVRM for the South Shoreline Museum Project.
344		Baggage car	1929	Pullman Standard	Display	Built for the Nickel Plate Road, Sold To Norfolk and Western Railway in 1964. Converted for Maintenance of way service by N&W in 1969 and renumbered 526706. Donated to the Hoosier Valley Railroad Museum by Norfolk Southern in September 1989.
2937		Coach	1955	American Car & Foundry	Operational	Built for the Long Island Railroad. Acquired by the Hoosier Valley Railroad Museum in the 2000s and underwent extensive restoration from 2008 to 2011.
4328		Coach	1917	Pullman Standard	Stored	Built for the Erie-Lackawanna Railroad. Used by ITM for the 1984 Indiana State Fair Train; Stored by ITM from 1985 to 2018. Sold to Hoosier Valley Railroad Museum by ITM in 2018.
2		Business Car	1924	Pullman Standard	Operational	Initially used by the Great Northern Railway on The Oriental Limited train. Purchased by Monon from Pullman in 1953, named "Lynne". Sold by Monon to private owner in 1971, moved to Michigan City, Indiana. Donated by private owner to Monon Railroad Historical Technical Society in 2011, moved from Michigan City to Indiana Railway Museum (IRM). Stored at IRM from 2011 to 2023, Donated by Monon Railroad Historical Technical Society to Hoosier Valley Railroad Museum in 2023.

=== Freight Cars ===
Freight car details
Number	Image	Type	Built	Builder	Status	Description
49114		Boxcar	1920s	Pullman Standard	Display	Built for the Wabash Railroad, Acquired by Hoosier Valley Railroad Museum in the 1990s.
15979		Boxcar	1937	GATX	Display	Built for the Nickel Plate Road, Sold to Norfolk and Western in 1964. Converted for Maintenance of way service in the 1960s and renumbered 556001. Donated to Hoosier Valley Railroad Museum by Norfolk Southern in August 1989.
15797		Boxcar	1937	GATX	Display	Built for the Nickel Plate Road, Sold To Norfolk and Western Railway in 1964. Donated to the City of Orland Park, Illinois by Norfolk Southern. Acquired by private owner, donated by private owner to Hoosier Valley Railroad Museum in May 1994.
1220		Boxcar	1941	Pullman Standard	Stored	Built for the Monon Railroad. Donated to the Indiana Transportation Museum by Alcoa Aluminum Co. of West Lafayette, Indiana, in December 1986. Moved to Logansport in 2019. Stored by ITM from 1986 to 2021. Sold to private owner and moved to the Hoosier Valley Railroad Museum on August 7, 2021.
54890		Boxcar	1937	Ralston Car Company	Display	Built for the Norfolk and Western Railway. Converted by N&W to Maintenance of way service in 1972. Donated to the Hoosier Valley Railroad Museum by Norfolk Southern in September 1989.
153177		Boxcar	1935	Pennsylvania Railroad	Display	Built for the Pennsylvania Railroad and originally numbered 607627. Sold to Penn Central in 1968, renumbered 153177. Donated to the Hoosier Valley Railroad Museum by Conrail in March 1994.
573029		Boxcar	1935	Pennsylvania Railroad	Stored	Built for the Pennsylvania Railroad. Sold to Penn Central in 1968. Donated to the Hoosier Valley Railroad Museum by Thornhope Elevator in 1989.
136470		Boxcar	19??		Stored	Built for the Louisville & Nashville. Sold by L&N to Family Lines, renumbered 136470. Donated to the Hoosier Valley Railroad Museum by CSX in 2022.
137057		Boxcar	19??		Stored	Built for the Seaboard Coast Line. Donated to the Hoosier Valley Railroad Museum by CSX in 2022.
137140		Boxcar	19??		Stored	Built for the Seaboard Coast Line, originally numbered 24503. Donated to the Hoosier Valley Railroad Museum by CSX in 2022.
507156		Boxcar	19??		Stored	Built for the Baltimore & Ohio. Donated to the Hoosier Valley Railroad Museum by CSX in 2022.
284		Boxcar	1953	Pullman Standard	Display	Built for the Chicago & North Western. Sold by C&NW to Lawrence Foods in 1983. Donated to the Hoosier Valley Railroad Museum by Lawrence Foods in April 2010.
13385		Reefer	1956	Pacific Car & Foundry	Display	Built for Merchants Despatch, Donated to Hoosier Valley Railroad Museum by Merchants Despatch in 1995.
14070		Reefer	1953	Pacific Car & Foundry	Display	Built for Merchants Despatch, Donated to Hoosier Valley Railroad Museum by Merchants Despatch in 1995.
1114		Tank car	1919	American Car and Foundry	Stored	Built for Palace Poultry Tank Car (PTCX), Sold by PTCX to Walter Haffner Company. Sold by Walter Haffner Company to Animal Byproducts of New Carlisle, Indiana. Donated to Hoosier Valley Railroad Museum by Animal Byproducts in July 1993.
87877		Tank car	1919	American Car and Foundry	Display	Built for General American Transportation Corporation (GATX), Donated by GATX to Hammond Fire Department for training purposes. Donated to Hoosier Valley Railroad Museum by Hammond Fire Department in 2021.
479727		Trailer Train Flat car	1960	Pullman Standard	Stored	Built for Trailer Train. Donated to the Hoosier Valley Railroad Museum by Trailer Train in June 1989.
13833		Flat car	1968	Pullman Standard	Operational	Built for the Missouri-Kansas-Texas Railroad (MKT). Sold by MKT to the Chicago, South Shore and South Bend Railroad (CSS), renumbered 18010. Donated to the Hoosier Valley Railroad Museum by CSS in summer 2008. Converted by HVRM into open air car.
1946		Flat car	1926	Standard Steel Car Company	Operational	Built for the Wheeling and Lake Erie Railway (MKT). To the Nickel Plate Road in 1949, Converted to haul piggyback trailers in 1956 or 1957. Sold to the Norfolk Southern Railway (NS) in 1988. Donated to the Hoosier Valley Railroad Museum by NS in 1998. Converted by HVRM into open air car.
2733		Flat car	1926	Bethlehem Steel	Stored	Built for the Nickel Plate Road. Sold to the Norfolk & Western Railway in 1964. Donated to the Hoosier Valley Railroad Museum by Norfolk Southern in 1998.
		Side Dump Car	1900s		Display	Built for the Western Indiana Gravel Company. Donated to the Hoosier Valley Railroad Museum by Vulcan Materials of West Lafayette, Indiana in 1993.

=== Cabooses ===
Caboose details
Number	Image	Type	Built	Builder	Status	Description
184		Transfer	1970		Out of service	Built for the Elgin, Joliet and Eastern Railway. Donated to the museum in 1989.
510		Cupola	1956	International Car Corporation	Operational	Built for the Elgin, Joliet and Eastern Railway and leased to the Bessemer and Lake Erie Railroad. Donated to the museum in 1989.
C345		Bay window	1953	International Car Corporation	Operational	Built for the Erie Railroad. Donated to the museum in 1995.
75072		Transfer			Stored	Built by the Grand Trunk Western Railroad from a 40' boxcar. Donated to the museum in 2006.
9914		Cupola			Display	Built for the Illinois Central Railroad. Donated to the museum in 1991.
58					Stored	
81532		Extended vision	1956	Monon Lafayette Shops	Under restoration	Built by the Monon Railroad. Donated to the museum in 2023.
81551		Transfer	1956	Monon Lafayette Shops	Awaiting restoration	Built by the Monon Railroad. Sold to a private owner & moved to the Indiana Transportation Museum in the 1980s. Stored at ITM from the 1980s to 2018, Moved to Logansport, Indiana in December 2018. Moved to HVRM in 2021.
471		Bay window	1962	International Car Corporation	Operational	Built for the Nickel Plate Road. Donated to the museum in 1995.
