= St. Peter Lutheran Church & School =

St. Peter Lutheran Church
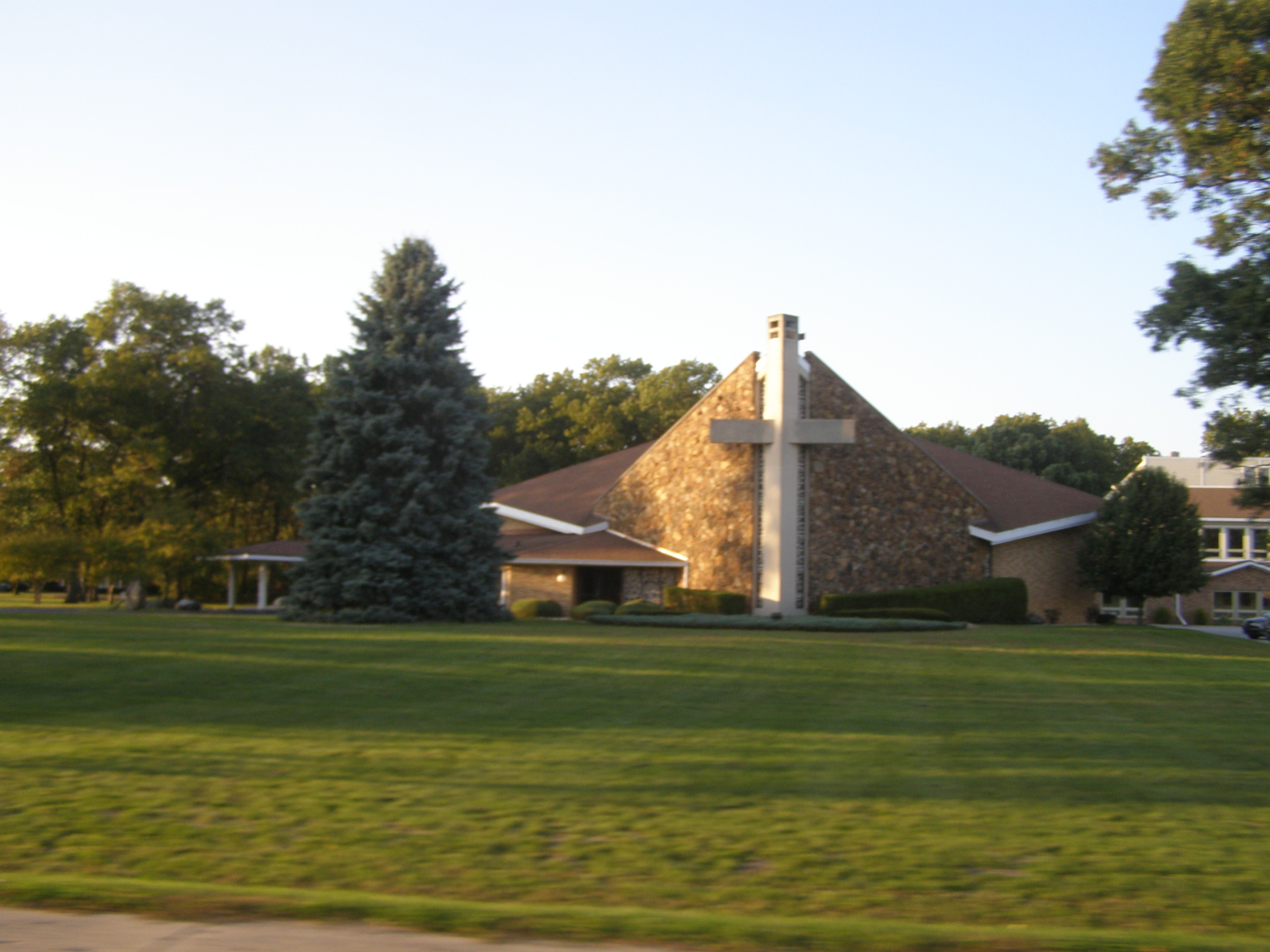
- St. Peter Lutheran Church in 2012
- St. Peter Lutheran Church
- 41.216086°N 86.787403°W
- Location: North Judson, Indiana
- Country: United States
- Denomination: Lutheran Church–Missouri Synod

History
- Status: Active
- Founded: 1872
- Founder: Rev. J. Henry Cox

Architecture
- Functional status: Active
- Completed: October 1873

Administration
- District: Indiana District

Clergy
- Pastor: Rev. Daniel Speckhard Rev. Garry Wickert

St. Peter Lutheran Church & School
- 810 W Talmer Avenue; North Judson, Starke County, Indiana 46366; United States

Information
- Type: Private
- Denomination: Lutheran
- Established: c. 1873
- Founder: Rev. J. Henry Cox
- Principal: Rhonda Reimers
- Faculty: 25
- Grades: PK-8
- Gender: Co-educational
- Enrollment: 152 (2025)
- Student to teacher ratio: 6.08
- Mascot: Wildcats
- Accreditation: National Association Committee of the Lutheran Church-Missouri Synod; State of Indiana
- Website: stpeternorthjudson.org

St. Peter Lutheran Church & School is a private school and church located in North Judson, Indiana, U.S. It is a member of the Indiana District of the Lutheran Church – Missouri Synod (LCMS).

== History ==
St. Peter Lutheran Church was organized in 1872 under Rev. J. Henry Cox. The original church building was a 26-by-40-foot (7.9 m × 12.2 m) wooden building on East Talmer Avenue. The church was built and dedicated in October 1873.

Inspired by Proverbs 22:6, the founders of the church began a Christian day school that was held in the church. The responsibility for teaching the four Rs (the three Rs plus religion) fell on the pastors. Due to pastors also teaching in surrounding areas, school was held two days a week year-round, with the exception of August during hot conditions and household work obligations.

In December 1874, St. Peter acquired its first full-time pastor. In 1880, the church became affiliated with the Evangelical Lutheran Synod of Missouri, Ohio, and Other States, now the Lutheran Church – Missouri Synod.

The first dedicated school building was built in 1893 on the East Talmer Avenue church site with pastors continuing to teach until 1912, at which time a full time teacher joined the school. In 1936, the school building was sold and the school moved to a new location at 110 East Weninger Street as an annex to the church. In 1959, planning for new buildings began, and by January 1961, students moved into the new facility at its current location on West Talmer Avenue. In December 1971, the congregation decided to build a new church next to the school. Construction began in 1974 and finished in 1975. The new church building was dedicated in June 1975.

Preschool programs were added to the school in January 1992. The school received full accreditation by the National Association Committee of the LCMS in August 1995 and has maintained accreditation since theen. On May 20, 2007, groundbreaking for a school addition took place with the aid of The Laborers for Christ, a group of men and women who do physical labor for Christ. This addition included new classrooms, a new gymnasium, and a building connection between the church and school. The new addition was completed in the spring of 2008 and officially dedicated in April 2008.
