= North Judson Erie Trail =

- Length: 11 mi (18 km)
- Location: North Judson, Indiana; Starke County
- Trailheads: North Judson, Indiana; Ora, Indiana
- Use: Hiking, Horseback Riding, Mountain Biking

The North Judson Erie Trail is a multi-use rail trail located in North Judson, Indiana. The trail was established in partnership with Prairie Trails Club and follows the former JK Line Railroad. The North Judson Erie Trail is part of the American Discovery Trail System.

== History ==
In 2008, the Town of North Judson received a $450,000 grant from then-Governor Mitch Daniels to build the North Judson-Monterrey Trail.

== Route details ==
The North Judson Erie Trail western trailhead is located in North Judson, Indiana just west of the intersection of Main and Simmons Street. The trail travels southeast continuously and crosses Indiana State Road 39/10 and Range Road before running through unincorporated Aldine. The trail also crosses U.S. Highway 35, south of Bass Lake. The trail continues to the eastern trailhead located on S 700 E just north of the intersection with E 900 S in Ora.

The trails crosses 12 roads, including one state highway and one U.S. highway. The trail crosses over six ditches.

Additional parking locations along the route include a parking lot in North Judson at the intersection of SR 39/10 and S 250 W and a parking lot in Bass Lake off of U.S. 35 between E 800 and 850 S.
