= North Judson, Indiana =

- Town
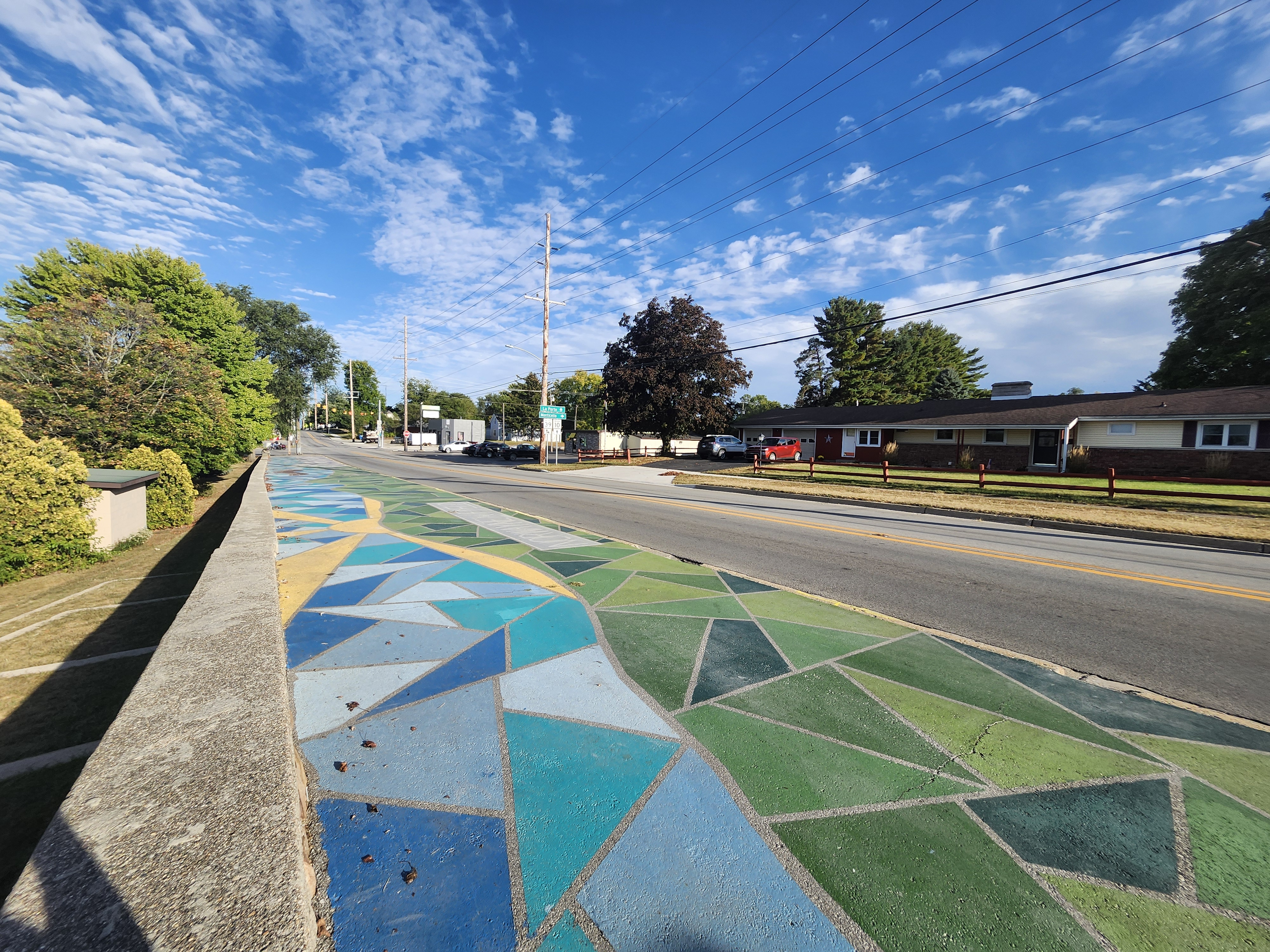
- Junction of State Roads 39 and 10 taken from Norwayne Field on Talmer Avenue (September 21, 2024).

- Seal

- Location of North Judson in Starke County, Indiana.
- Coordinates: 41°12′58″N 86°46′37″W
- Country: United States
- State: Indiana
- County: Starke
- Township: Wayne

Area
  - Total: 1.11 sq mi (2.87 km^{2})
  - Land: 1.11 sq mi (2.87 km^{2})
  - Water: 0 sq mi (0.00 km^{2})
- Elevation: 705 ft (215 m)

Population (2020)
  - Total: 1,857
  - Estimate (2024): 1,823 ▼
  - Density: 1,680/sq mi (647/km^{2})
- Time zone: UTC-6 (Central (CST))
  - Summer (DST): UTC-5 (CDT)
- ZIP code: 46366
- Area code: 574
- FIPS code: 18-54900
- GNIS feature ID: 2396820
- Website: www.northjudsonin.gov

North Judson is a town in Wayne Township, Starke County, in the U.S. state of Indiana. The population was 1,857 as of the 2020 census.

== History ==
=== Establishment ===
The area now known as North Judson was originally Brantwood, a town platted on October 1, 1859, less than a mile northwest of the current town. The town post office (postmaster Daniel Kelly) was established on September 24, 1860, as North Judson after William D. Judson, President of the Cincinnati & Chicago Railroad (later a part of the Pittsburgh, Cincinnati, Chicago and St. Louis Railroad), which had just been laid through the town. The 'North' was likely added to eliminate confusion with downstate Judson, Indiana. The post office was later reestablished on August 31, 1864, under postmaster Levi Lightcap, not moving to its current location until 1949. The town of North Judson proper was later laid out in 1866 and incorporated in 1888.

=== Railroads ===
By the last two decades of the 19th century, many developments came to North Judson. In 1881, the Indiana, Illinois and Iowa Railroad (New York Central) was built from the neighboring town of San Pierre to North Judson. This railroad was later extended east to neighboring city of Knox in 1885. The Chicago and Atlantic Railroad (later Chicago and Erie) was built through North Judson and several other surrounding towns in 1882–1883. The town formerly owned and remains the headquarters of the Chesapeake & Indiana Railroad.

=== Schools ===
In 1851, a one-room, log schoolhouse located west of North Judson served as the first school. A two-story school was later built on the corner of current-day Keller and Central Ave in 1875. The school was re-built again and updated to brick in 1896. In 1892, North Judson established a two-year high school and, in 1889, had the first commissioned four-year high school in the county. A new high school was built in 1921. Between 1922, all remaining one-room, rural schoolhouses in Wayne Township closed and consolidated into North Judson schools. North Judson High School merged with San Pierre High School in 1964 after San Pierre High School closed. North Judson Liberty Elementary opened in 1966 and acts as the current elementary school for North Judson. In 1972, construction started on the current North Judson-San Pierre (NJSP) High School building; construction finished in 1975. In 1990, the middle school extension was added to the building. The high school's Athletic & Fine Arts Center opened in 2006. In the 2010s, the NJSP Middle School and NJSP San Pierre kindergarten site closed. Kindergartners and 6th graders were moved to NJSP Liberty Elementary, while 7th and 8th graders were moved to the high school, establishing the NJSP Junior/Senior High School.

=== Churches ===
St. Peter Lutheran Church was built in 1873. Following this, United Methodist Church and Saints Cyril & Methodius Catholic Church were built in 1875 and 1881, respectively. The Catholic church was rebuilt in 1910 and still stands in its original location. The Methodist church was rebuilt and relocated to its current location in 1949. Ten years later, in 1959, the Lutheran church was also rebuilt and relocated to its current location.

=== Other history ===
The North Judson News (Kankakee Valley Times) and North Judson Fire Station were both organized in 1889 by J.A. Gilkey and Cpt. Louis Foust, respectively. 1889 also had the first town election for North Judson. The first oil street lights were introduced in 1892 and were later replaced with electric lighting in 1896. Paved roads began replacing brick ones in 1913, and a town wide water system was installed in 1921. On September 14, 1917, the town received a $10,000 grant from the Andrew Carnegie Foundation to build the North Judson Public Library; the library was established in 1921. NIPSCO installed natural gas in North Judson in 1960.

== Geography ==
North Judson is located at the intersection of State Road 10 and State Road 39.

According to the 2010 census, North Judson has a total area of 1.1 square miles (2.85 km^{2}), all land.

== Demographics ==
Historical population
Census	Pop.	Note	%±
1870	115		—
1880	165		43.5%
1890	572		246.7%
1900	868		51.7%
1910	1,122		29.3%
1920	1,189		6.0%
1930	1,348		13.4%
1940	1,408		4.5%
1950	1,705		21.1%
1960	1,942		13.9%
1970	1,738		−10.5%
1980	1,653		−4.9%
1990	1,582		−4.3%
2000	1,675		5.9%
2010	1,772		5.8%
2020	1,857		4.8%
2024 (est.)	1,823	▼	−1.8%
U.S. Decennial Census

=== 2020 census ===
As of the 2020 census, there were 1,857 people, 774 households, and 516 families residing in the town. The median age was 38.1 years. 23.6% of residents were under the age of 18 and 19.0% of residents were 65 years of age or older. For every 100 females there were 91.8 males, and for every 100 females age 18 and over there were 86.1 males age 18 and over. The gender makeup of the town was 47.9% male and 52.1% female.

0.0% of residents lived in urban areas, while 100.0% lived in rural areas.

There were 774 households in North Judson, of which 28.9% had children under the age of 18 living in them. Of all households, 41.1% were married-couple households, 18.3% were households with a male householder and no spouse or partner present, and 32.2% were households with a female householder and no spouse or partner present. About 31.9% of all households were made up of individuals and 14.0% had someone living alone who was 65 years of age or older. The average household size was 2.81 and the average family size was 3.11.

There were 843 housing units, of which 8.2% were vacant. The homeowner vacancy rate was 0.6% and the rental vacancy rate was 7.8%.

Racial composition as of the 2020 census
Race	Number	Percent
White	1,730	93.2%
Black or African American	8	0.4%
American Indian and Alaska Native	5	0.3%
Asian	5	0.3%
Native Hawaiian and Other Pacific Islander	0	0.0%
Some other race	22	1.2%
Two or more races	87	4.7%
Hispanic or Latino (of any race)	135	7.3%

=== Income and poverty ===
The median income for a household in the town was $47,578, and the median income for a family was $52,614. About 17.8% of the population were determined to be at or below the poverty line.

=== 2010 census ===
As of the census of 2010, there were 1,772 people, 706 households, and 456 families residing in the town. The population density was 1,611 inhabitants per square mile (622.0105774119/km^{2}). There were 791 housing units at an average density of 719 per square mile (278/km^{2}). The racial makeup of the town was 96.7% White, 0.1% Black or African American, 0.3% Native American, 0.2% Asian, 1.2% from other races, and 1.5% from two or more races. Hispanic or Latino of any race were 7.3% of the population.

There were 706 households, of which 32.3% had children under the age of 18 living with them, 43.5% were married couples living together, 14.9% had a female householder with no husband present, 6.2% had a male householder with no wife present, and 35.4% were non-families. 30.6% of all households were made up of individuals, and 14.7% had someone living alone who was 65 years of age or older. The average household size was 2.51 and the average family size was 3.11.

The median age in the town was 37.7 years. 27% of residents were under the age of 18; 8.3% were between the ages of 18 and 24; 24.5% were from 25 to 44; 24.7% were from 45 to 64; and 15.5% were 65 years of age or older. The gender makeup of the town was 48.0% male and 52.0% female.

=== 2000 census ===
As of the census of 2000, there were 1,675 people, 648 households, and 425 families residing in the town. The population density was 1,820.1 inhabitants per square mile (702.7/km^{2}). There were 704 housing units at an average density of 765.0 units per square mile (295.4 units/km^{2}). The racial makeup of the town was 97.01% White, 0.06% African American, 0.12% Native American, 0.06% Asian, 1.97% from other races, and 0.78% from two or more races. Hispanic or Latino of any race were 6.39% of the population.

There were 648 households, out of which 34.7% had children under the age of 18 living with them, 49.7% were married couples living together, 12.3% had a female householder with no husband present, and 34.4% were non-families. 31.5% of all households were made up of individuals, and 15.9% had someone living alone who was 65 years of age or older. The average household size was 2.58 and the average family size was 3.27.

In the town, the population was spread out, with 31.1% under the age of 18, 8.1% from 18 to 24, 29.0% from 25 to 44, 16.2% from 45 to 64, and 15.6% who were 65 years of age or older. The median age was 33 years. For every 100 females, there were 85.7 males. For every 100 females age 18 and over, there were 86.4 males.

The median income for a household in the town was $29,779, and the median income for a family was $39,792. Males had a median income of $31,071 versus $21,467 for females. The per capita income for the town was $13,052. About 10.5% of families and 12.7% of the population were below the poverty line, including 12.3% of those under age 18 and 15.2% of those age 65 or over.

== Education ==
=== Library ===
The town has a lending library, the North Judson-Wayne Township Library.

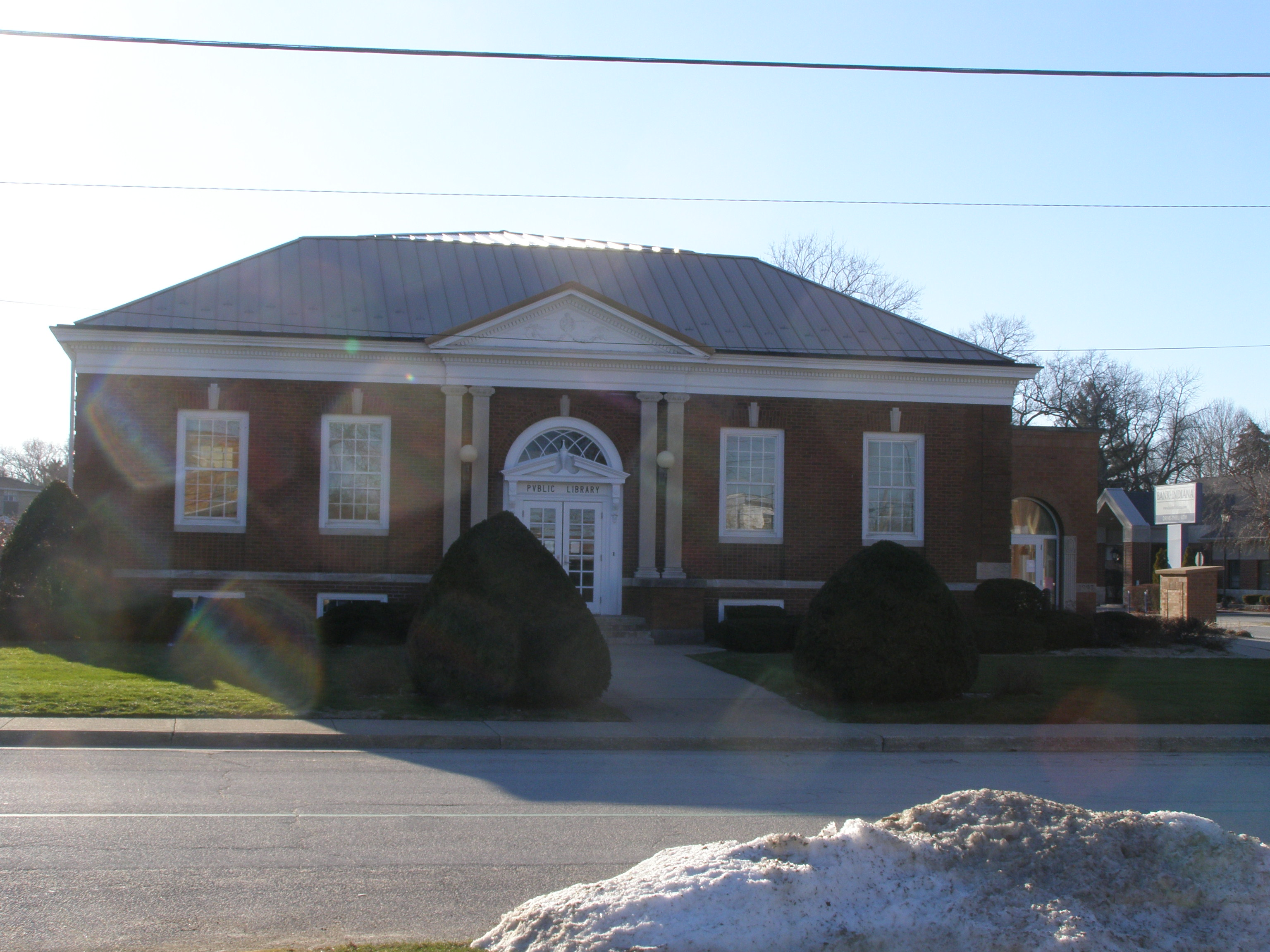
North Judson-Wayne Township Library in 2011.

=== Public education ===
North Judson-San Pierre Liberty Elementary teaches kindergarten through sixth grade, while North Judson-San Pierre Junior/Senior High School teaches seventh through twelfth grade.

=== Private education ===
St. Peter Lutheran School teaches kindergarten through eighth grade. St. Peter also provides preschool and pre-k programs.

== Arts and culture ==
=== Attractions ===
==== Hoosier Valley Railroad Museum ====
North Judson is home to the Hoosier Valley Railroad Museum, a memorial to American railroad culture that offers old-fashioned train rides on Saturdays. A short train ride reaches English Lake, at the Kankakee and Yellow Rivers' confluence, before returning to the museum. The Hoosier Valley Railroad Museum also hosts special events during the holidays that include train rides.

==== Melody Drive-In ====
About ten miles east on SR 10, just south of Bass Lake on U.S. 35, is the Melody Drive-in Theater. The Melody Drive-In has two screens across 13 acres and plays two different double features every night; concessions are available on site. The theater is typically open from May through October, weather permitting.

=== Festivals and events ===
==== Mint Festival ====
Every Father's Day weekend since 1977, the town hosts the Mint Festival to celebrate the history of mint farming in the area. During the festival, vendors are set up on Lane Street between Sycamore and Main Street. Rides and activities are set up on the corner of Keller Avenue and Main Street. Additional vendors and a beer garden are set up at Norwayne Field, a Works Progress Administration-built park, where musicians perform live throughout the weekend.

There is an opportunity for community members between the ages of 4 through 20 to compete in the Mint Pageant. The age group categories are: Little Mister and Little Miss Mint (ages 4–8), Mint Prince and Princess (ages 9–14), and Mint King and Queen (ages 15–20). Starting in 2026, there will also be a healthy baby category for contestants under the age of 4. The “Mint Court” takes parts in many activities throughout the festival, including the town parade, which takes place on Sunday.

Students that live in or attend school in Starke County are eligible to nominate their fathers or grandfathers for the Mint Festival's Father/Grandfather of the Year Award by essay. The two winning authors and father/grandfather receive a prize, are recognized during the festivals opening ceremonies, and are also part of the Mint Parade.

==== Norwayne Field Tree Lighting Ceremony ====
On the first Friday of every December, the town hosts a Christmas parade and tree lighting ceremony at Norwayne Field. The trees are decorated prior by local businesses, organizations, and community members. After the parade and lighting, refreshments are provided, and children get a chance to meet Santa Claus.

=== Sports ===
The community of North Judson is also a strong supporter of its high school North Judson-San Pierre, and the athletic teams the Blue Jays, particularly in football, and basketball, both boys and girls. The Blue Jays have a longtime football rivalry with the Knox Community High School Redskins, and games are among the biggest high school sports events each season.

== Parks and recreation ==
North Judson has a town park located on Weninger Street. The park has a playground, a basketball court, two pickleball courts, a beach volleyball court, three baseball fields, permanent cornhole boards, and a short walking trail.

The Chesapeake Run Golf Club, located on S. 250 W. off SR 10, offers an 18-hole course.

The western North Judson Erie Trail trailhead is located in North Judson just west of the intersection of Main and Simmons Street. Additional parking along the trail in North Judson is located just off SR 10 on S. 250 W. The trail travels 11 miles southeast to Ora.

Ten miles east on SR 10, the Bass Lake Beach and Campground offers swimming, fishing, boating, and camping.

== Churches ==
- First Free Will Baptist Church (209 E Talmer Avenue)
- Heartland Christian Center (301 N Main Street)
- St. Cyril & Methodius Church (303 Keller Avenue)
- St. Peter Lutheran Church (810 State Road 10)
- United Methodist Church (210 Central Avenue)

== Notable people ==
- David Haugh, sports columnist of the Chicago Tribune
- Henry F. Schricker, 36th and 38th Governor of Indiana
