= Mulberry Phosphate Museum =

Museum in Mulberry, Florida

Coordinates: 27.89366°N 81.97317°W

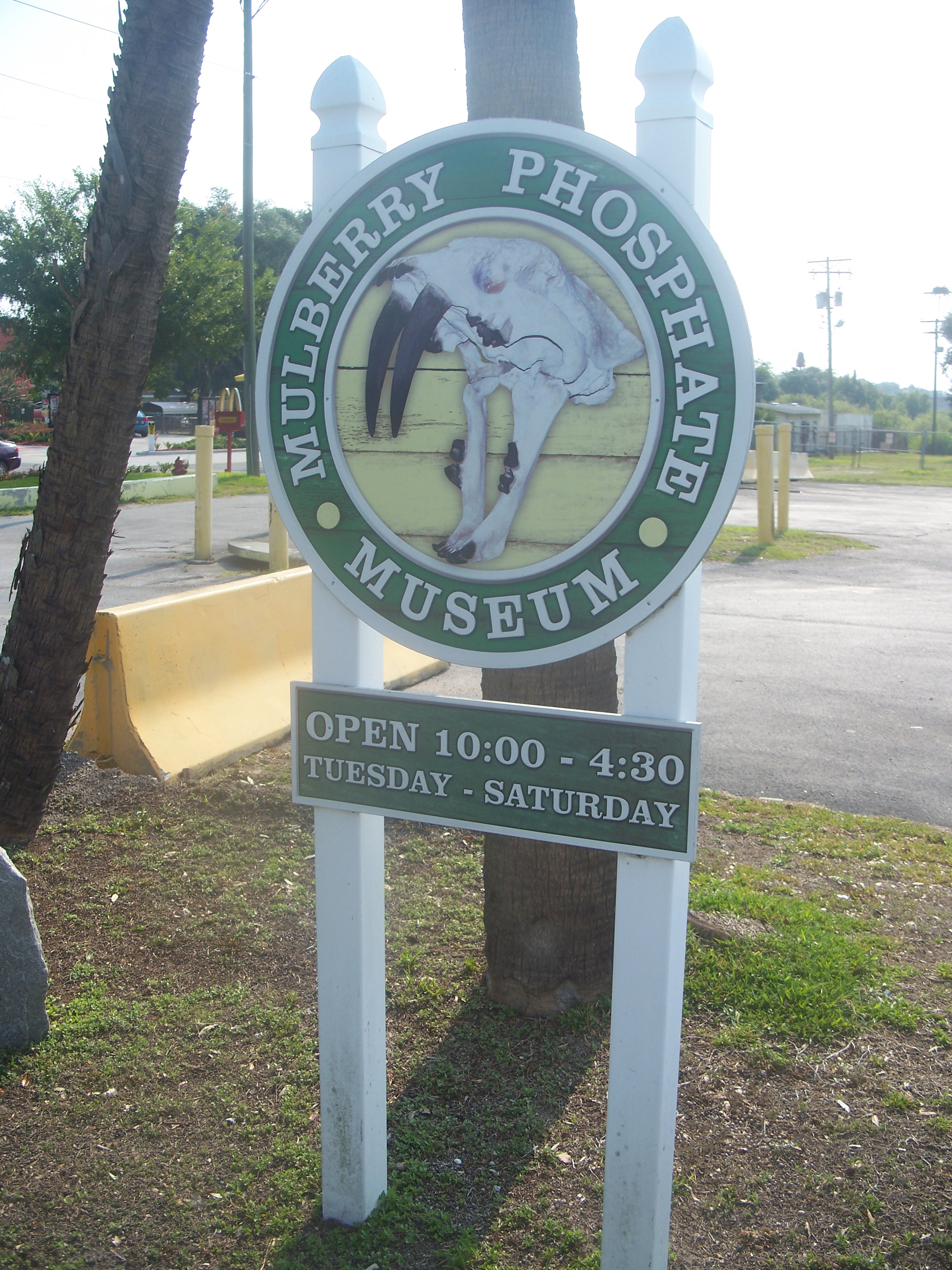
Mulberry Phosphate Museum signage

The Mulberry Phosphate Museum is a museum located in Mulberry, Florida, about the phosphate mining industry in the area. Located in the city's original railroad depot, the museum was established in 1986. Exhibitions include fossils, memorabilia and exhibits about the phosphate mining industry. In 2013 it added a recently discovered 1880s-vintage phosphate locomotive.

== Gallery ==
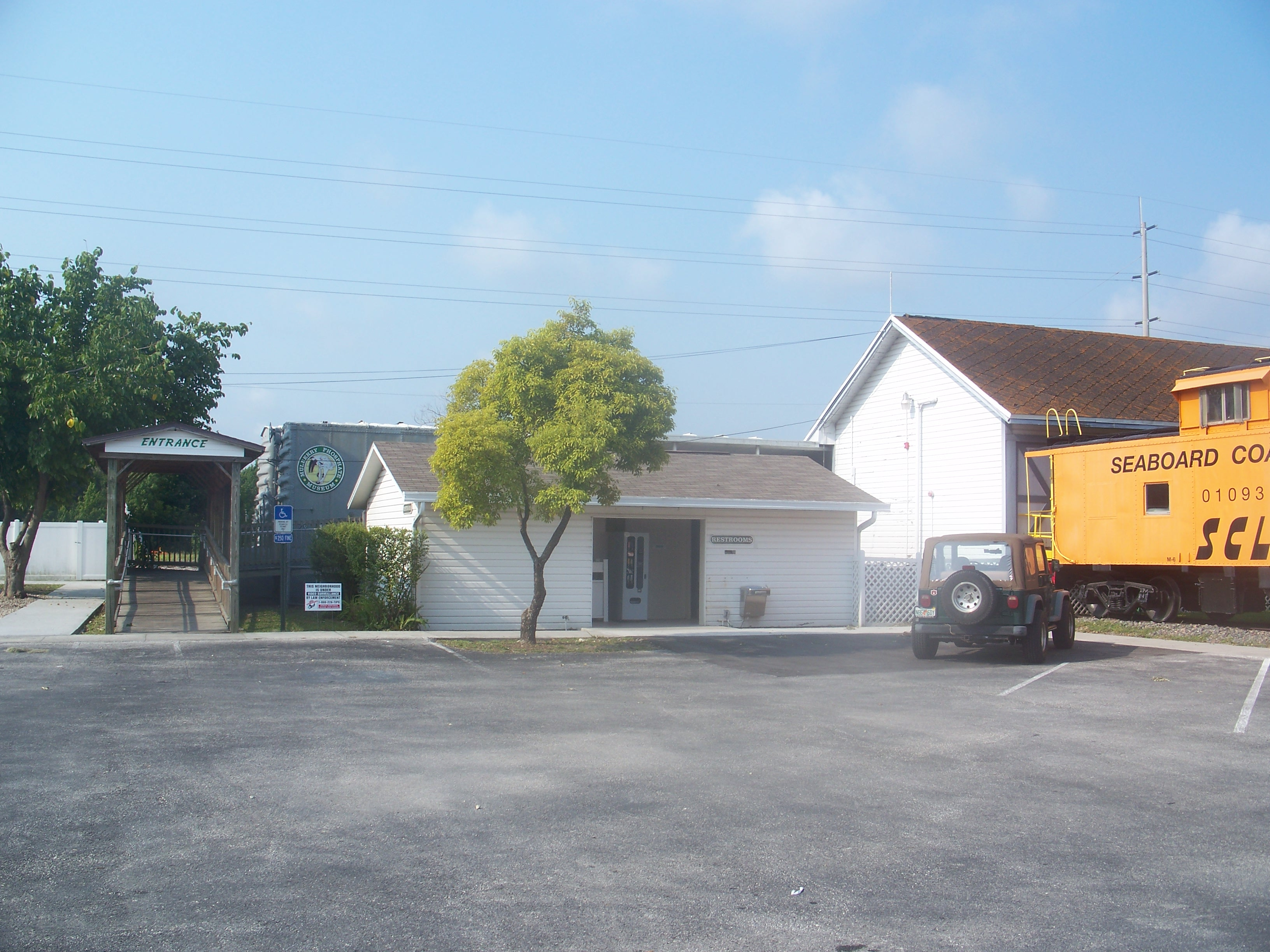
Mulberry Phosphate Museum entrance

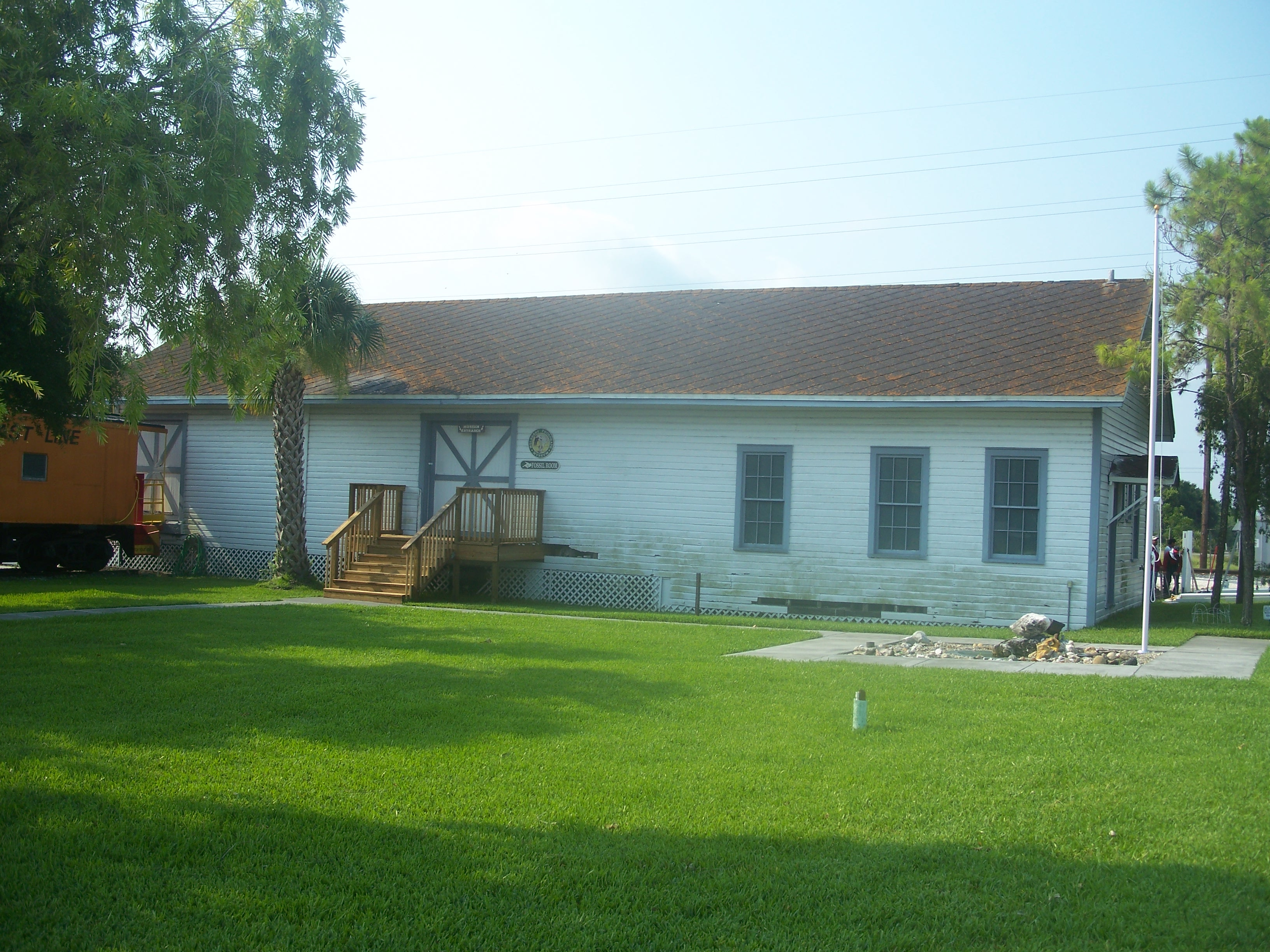
Mulberry Phosphate Museum building

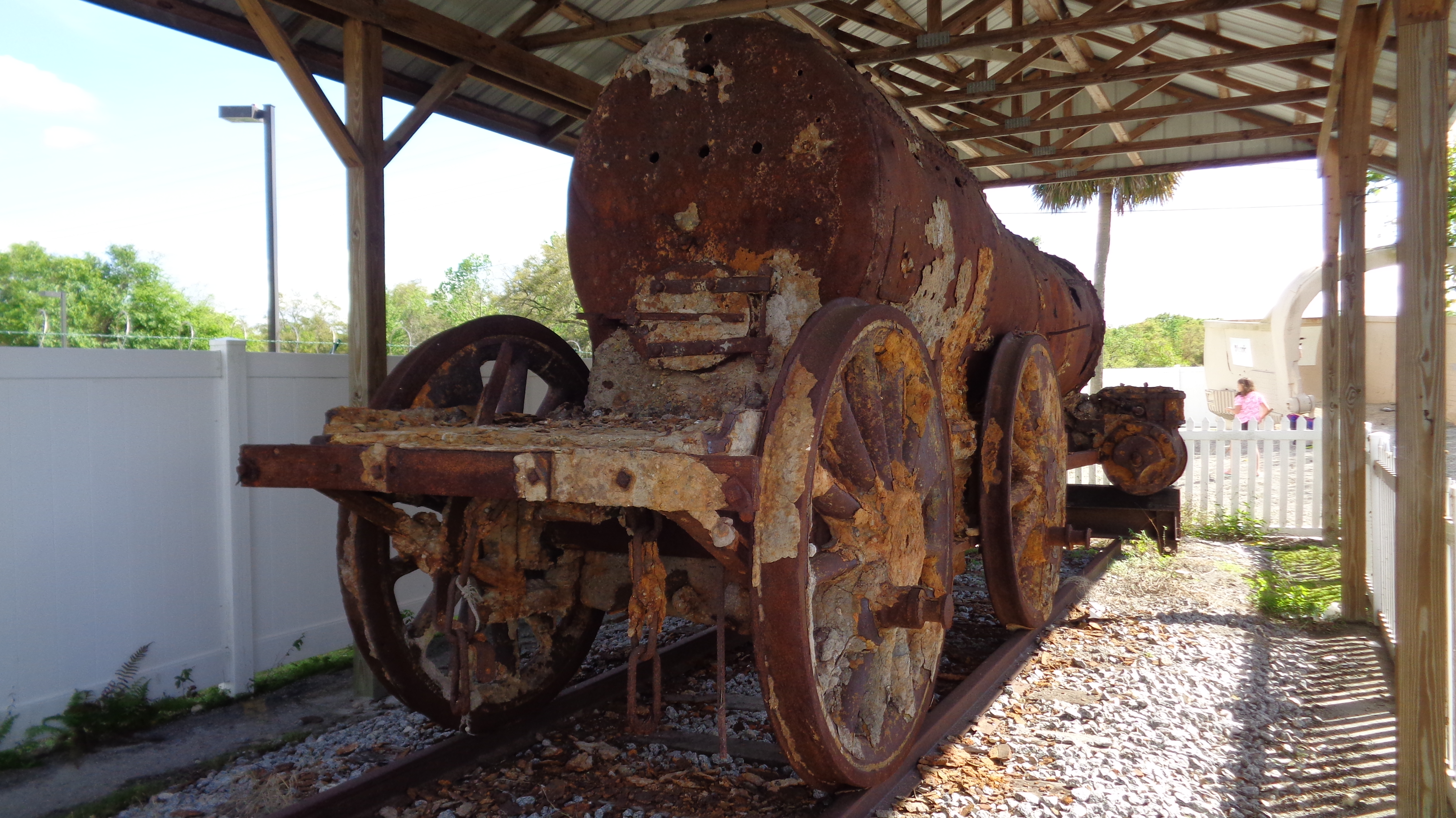
1880s-built Manchester Locomotive Works 4-4-0 steam locomotive
