= Fraser Papers =

Canadian paper company

Fraser Papers Inc.
- Type: Public
- Industry: Paper & Paper Products
- Headquarters: Toronto, Ontario, Canada
- Key people: J. Peter Gordon
- Number of employees: 3,750

Fraser Papers Inc. was a Toronto, Ontario, Canada-based manufacturer of specialized printing, publishing, and converting papers, with customers in Canada and the United States. It managed more than two million acres (8,000 km^{2}) of forest, operated a tree nursery, and sawmills. It was spun off as a public company in 2004 by parent Nexfor Inc., which became Norbord at the same time. Its shares were publicly traded on the Toronto Stock Exchange, under the symbol FPS.

== History ==
Donald Fraser began his business with construction of a sawmill in 1877. Fraser sawmills at Cabano and Plaster Rock, New Brunswick were producing 76,000 cubic metres (32 million board feet) of spruce lumber annually through the mid-20th century. Sawmill edgings, slabs, and trimmings were converted to wood chips as a raw material for paper production.

At its nexus during the 1960s, Fraser Papers employed over 3,700 workers in several pulp and paper mills and saw mills throughout North America:

- Atholville, New Brunswick pulp mill
- Edmundston, New Brunswick pulp mill
- Madawaska, Maine paper mill
- Plaster Rock, New Brunswick saw mill
- Juniper, New Brunswick saw mill
- Thurso, Quebec pulp mill
- Cabano, Quebec saw mill (destroyed by fire in 1966)
- New Hampshire

The Edmundston-Madawaska mills are the only facilities in the world that pump pulp by pipeline over an international border.

In 2000, Nexfor Fraser Papers (as it was known at the time) was the first company to receive international certification to the Sustainable Forestry Initiative. Its operations are also certified to meet the ISO 14001 Standard for Environmental Management Systems requirements.

In June 2009, the company filed with the Canadian and American governments for bankruptcy protection so that it could re-structure. At the time Brookfield Asset Management owned a 70% share of the Fraser Papers company.

The Edmundston and Madawaska mills are still in operation but are now owned by Twin Rivers Paper Company, employing approximately 1000 workers.
