= EMD GP7 =

Diesel-electric locomotive

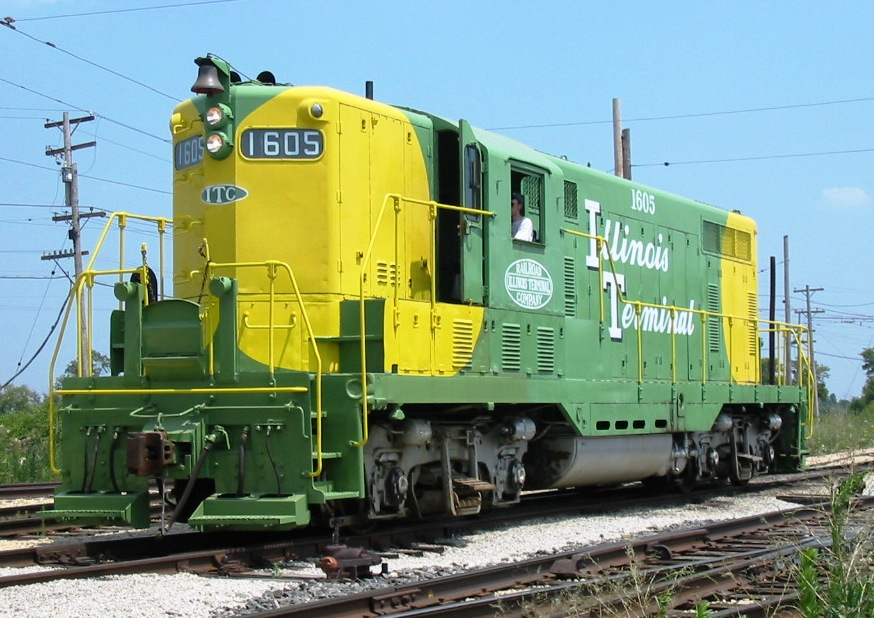
- ITC 1605, at the Illinois Railway Museum
Type and origin
- Power type: Diesel-electric
- Builder: General Motors Electro-Motive Division (EMD); General Motors Diesel (GMD)
- Model: GP7
- Build date: October 1949 – May 1954
- Total produced: 2,729 (plus 5 B units)
Specifications
- Configuration
  - AAR: B-B
- Gauge: 4 ft 8 1/2 in (1,435 mm) standard gauge
- Wheel diameter: 40 in (1.016 m)
- Minimum curve: 19° (301 ft (91.74 m) radius)
- Wheelbase: 40 ft (12.19 m)
- Length: 55 ft 11 in (17.04 m)
- Width: 10 ft 3 in (3.12 m)
- Height: 15 ft 0 in (4.57 m)
- Loco weight: 246,000 lb (112,000 kg)
- Fuel capacity: 1,600 US gal (6,100 L; 1,300 imp gal)
- Lubricant cap.: 200 US gal (760 L; 170 imp gal)
- Coolant cap.: 230 US gal (870 L; 190 imp gal)
- Sandbox cap.: 18 cu ft (510 dm^{3})
- Prime mover: EMD 16-567B
- RPM range: 275–800
- Engine type: V16 Two-stroke diesel
- Aspiration: Roots blower
- Displacement: 9,072 cu in (148.66 L)
- Generator: EMD D-12-B
- Traction motors: (4) EMD D-27-B
- Cylinders: 16
- Cylinder size: 8 1/2 in × 10 in (216 mm × 254 mm)
- Loco brake: Independent air; optional: dynamic brakes
- Train brakes: Air, schedule 6-BL or 6-BLC. Schedule 24-RL offered as optional.
Performance figures
- Maximum speed: 65 mph (105 km/h)
- Power output: 1,500 hp (1,119 kW)
- Tractive effort: Starting: 65,000 lbf (29,484 kgf) @25% Continuous: 40,000 lbf (18,144 kgf) @9.3 mph (15 km/h)
Career
- Operators: See list
- Class: Erie- MFSE-15a NYC- various P&E- 5612-5623 DRS-4c 5624-5625 DRS-4d P&LE- various NKP- ERS-15 PRR- ERS15 WAB- D15
- Disposition: Some retired, some rebuilt into GP8s or GP10s, many in service

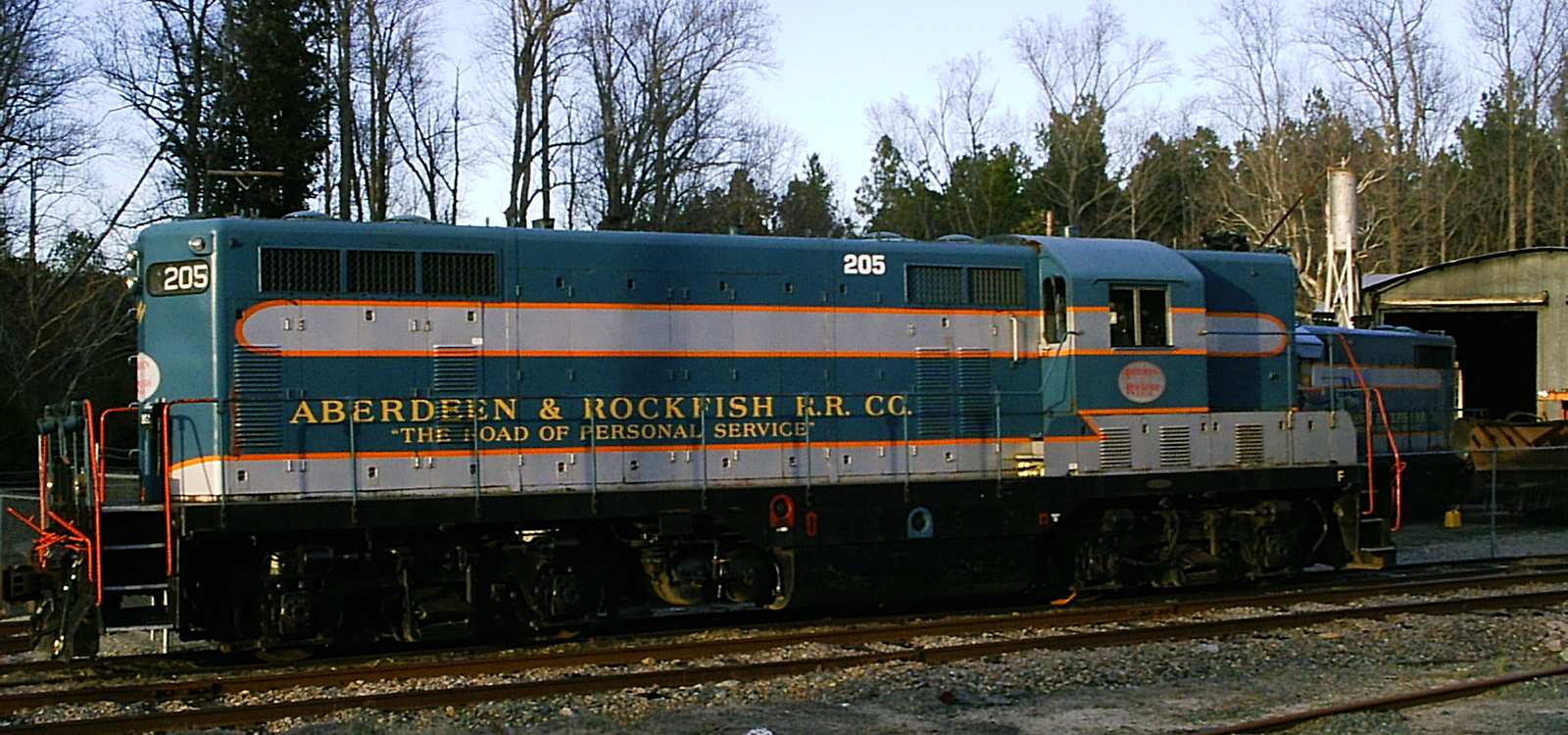
Aberdeen and Rockfish Railroad 205 at the company’s yard in Aberdeen, North Carolina

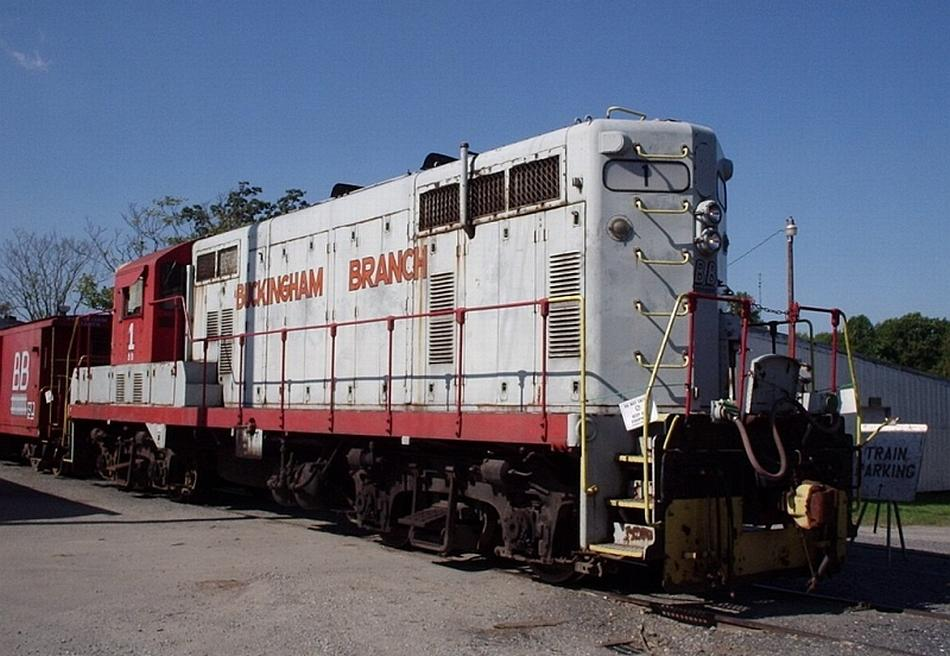
BBRR 1, a GP7, with the ODC special, Dillwyn, Virginia.

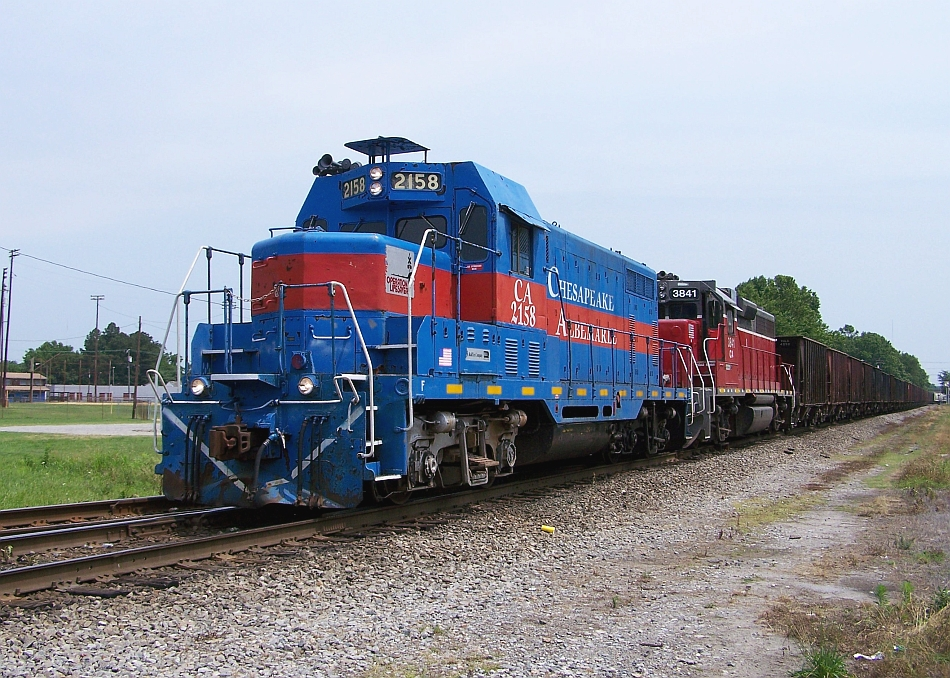
Chesapeake and Albemarle 2158 (an ex-ATSF GP7U) in Chesapeake, VA.

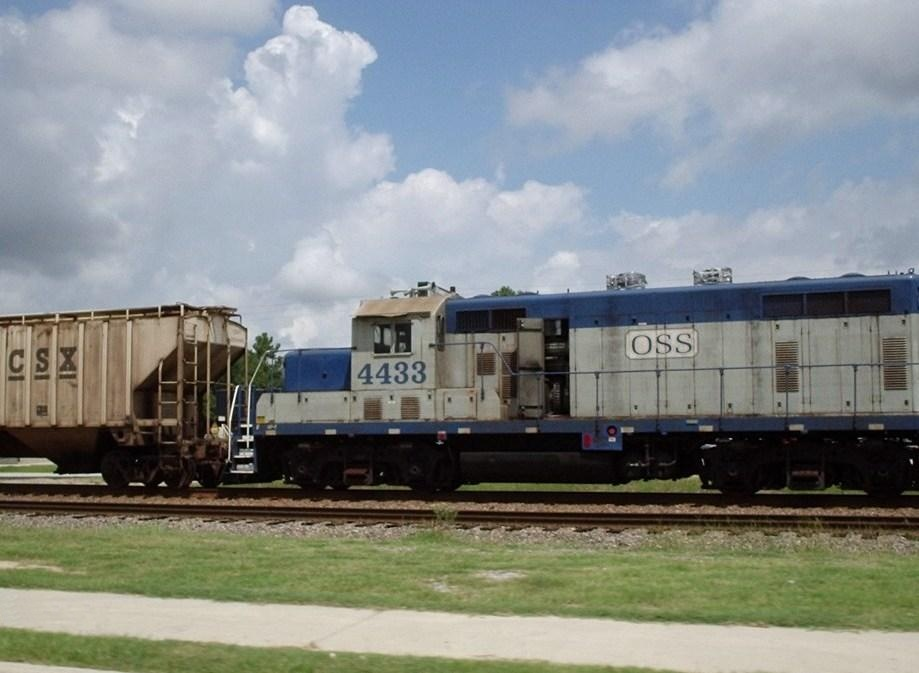
OmniTrax 4433 (a GP7 rebuilt by the Chicago and North Western Railway) spotted on CSX in Augusta, Georgia.

The EMD GP7 is a four-axle (B-B) diesel-electric locomotive built by General Motors Electro-Motive Division and General Motors Diesel between October 1949 and May 1954.

The GP7 was the first EMD road locomotive to use a hood unit design instead of a car-body design. This proved to be more efficient than the car body design as the hood unit cost less to build, was cheaper and easier to maintain, and had much better front and rear visibility for switching. Power was provided by an EMD 567B 16-cylinder engine which generated 1,500 horsepower (1,119 kW). The GP7 was offered both with and without control cabs, and those built without control cabs were called a GP7B. Five GP7B's were built between March and April 1953.

Of the 2,734 GP7's built, 2,620 were for American railroads (including 5 GP7B units built for the Atchison, Topeka and Santa Fe Railway), 112 were built for Canadian railroads, and 2 were built for Mexican railroads.

This was the first model in EMD's GP (General Purpose) series of locomotives. Concurrently, EMD offered a six-axle (C-C) SD (Special Duty) locomotive, the SD7. The GP7 was replaced by the GP9 model in GM-EMD's GP sequence.

== History ==
ALCO, Fairbanks-Morse, and Baldwin had all introduced road switchers before EMD, whose first attempt at the road-switcher, the BL2 was unsuccessful in the market, selling only 58 units in the 14 months it was in production. Its replacement, the GP7, swapped the truss-framed stressed car body for an un-stressed body on a frame made from flat, formed and rolled structural steel members and steel forgings welded into a single structure (a "weldment"), a basic design which is still being employed today. In heavy service, the GP7’s frame would bow and sag over time. This defect was corrected in later models.

The GP7 proved very popular, and EMD was barely able to meet demand, even after opening a second assembly plant at Cleveland, Ohio. Later, locomotives in EMD's GP-series came to be nicknamed ‘Geeps’. Many GP7s both high and short-hood can still be found in service today on shortline railroads and industrial operators. Although most Class 1 roads stopped using these locomotives by the 1980s some remain in rebuilt form on some major Class I railroads, as switcher locomotives. The "GP" designation stood for "general purpose", while the "7" had no meaning other than matching the EMD F7 cab unit then in production.

== Identification ==
The GP7, GP9 and GP18 locomotives share a similar car-body that evolved over time. Most GP7s had three sets of ventilation grills under the cab (where the GP9 only had one), and two pair of grills at the end of the long hood (where only the pair nearest the end was retained on the GP9). However, some late GP7s were built with car-bodies that were identical to early GP9s. Early GP7s had a solid skirt above the fuel tank, while late GP7s and early GP9s had access holes in the skirt (see photo of Illinois Terminal 1605, top left). Many railroads later removed most of the skirt to improve access and inspection.

Locomotives could be built with the engineer’s control stand installed for either the long hood, or the short hood designated as the front. Two control stands for either direction running was also an option, but one end would still be designated as the front for maintenance purposes. The GP7 was also available with or without dynamic brakes, and a steam generator installed in the short hood was also an option. In the latter case, the 1,600-US-gallon (6,100 L; 1,300 imp gal) fuel tank was divided, with half for diesel fuel, and half for boiler water. One option available for locomotives without dynamic brakes, was to remove the two 22.5 in × 102 in (570 mm × 2,590 mm) air reservoir tanks from under the frame, and replace them with four 12 in × 150.25 in (305 mm × 3,816 mm) tanks that were installed on the roof of the locomotive, above the prime mover. These "torpedo tubes" as they were nicknamed, enabled the fuel and water tanks to be increased to 1,100 US gallons (4,200 L; 920 imp gal) each, although some railroads opted for roof-mounted air tanks and 2,200-US-gallon (8,300 L; 1,800 imp gal) fuel tanks on their freight ‘Geeps’.

== Original buyers ==
=== Locomotives built by Electro-Motive Division, USA ===
Owner	Quantity	Numbers	Notes
Electro-Motive Division (demonstrator)	1	525	1350 hp GP7m; to Atchison, Topeka and Santa Fe 99, renumbered 2899 This unit was built with a 567BC engine.
Electro-Motive Division (demonstrator)	3	100 (ex-852), 200, 300	to Chicago & North Western 1518–1520. 1518 first built, preserved and operating at Illinois Railway Museum
Aberdeen and Rockfish Railroad	1	205	
Atchison, Topeka and Santa Fe	244	2650–2893	2855-2858 were built with 567C engines
Atchison, Topeka and Santa Fe	5	2788A–2792A	GP7B; 2788A-2789A, 2791A-2792A were built with 567C engines
Atlanta and St. Andrews Bay	2	501–502	
Atlanta and West Point Rail Road	5	571–575	
Atlantic and East Carolina Railway	1	501	Renumbered 406.
Atlantic Coast Line Railroad	154	100-253	
Baltimore and Ohio Railroad	33	720–731, 740–746, 910–922, 6405	728-729; 740-746 were built with 567BC engines; Long-hood-forward
Bangor and Aroostook Railroad	16	560–575	
Belt Railway of Chicago	8	470–477	
Boston and Maine Railroad	23	1555–1577	
Butte, Anaconda and Pacific Railway	3	101–103	
Central of Georgia Railway	15	106–107, 120–132	
Central Railroad of New Jersey	13	1520–1532	
Atlantic Coast Line Railroad (Charleston and Western Carolina Railway)	21	200–220	To Atlantic Coast Line 254-274
Chesapeake and Ohio Railway	180	5700–5719, 5739–5797, 5800–5900	5720–5738 built by GMD
Chicago and Eastern Illinois Railroad	30	203–232	
Chicago and North Western Railway	110	1521–1550, 1556–1559, 1562–1599, 1601–1603, 1625–1659	
Chicago and North Western (Chicago, St. Paul, Minneapolis and Omaha Railway—"Omaha Road")	11	151–161	
Chicago, Burlington and Quincy Railroad	68	200–267	253-267 were built with 567BC engines
Chicago Great Western Railway	2	120–121	
Chicago, Rock Island and Pacific Railroad	113	430–441, 1200–1237, 1250–1311, 1308 (2nd)	1294-1299 were built with 567BC engines
Clinchfield Railroad	17	900–916	
Colorado and Wyoming Railway	2	103–104	Engines 103 & 104 are owned by the Pueblo Railway Foundation. Both locomotives are operable and used occasionally on Museum grounds.
Colorado Fuel and Iron	2	101–102	Engine 102 is owned by the Pueblo Railway Foundation. The locomotive is operable and used occasionally on Museum grounds.
Atlantic Coast Line Railroad (Columbia, Newberry and Laurens Railroad)	5	100–104	To Atlantic Coast Line 275-279
Delaware, Lackawanna and Western Railroad	20	951–970	To Erie Lackawanna, 1270-1284, 1405-1409.
Denver and Rio Grande Western Railroad	14	5100–5113	
Detroit and Toledo Shore Line Railroad	10	41–50	
Detroit, Toledo and Ironton Railroad	24	950–973	964-973 were built with 567BC engines
Erie Railroad	52	1200–1246, 1400–1404	To Erie Lackawanna, same numbers
Florida East Coast Railway	15	607–621	
Georgia and Florida Railroad	6	701–706	
Georgia Railroad	16	1021–1036	1035-1036 were built with 567BC engines
Great Northern Railway	56	600–655	Long-hood-forward
Illinois Central Railroad	48	8800–8801, 8850–8851, 8900–8911, 8950–8981	8800–8801, 8900–8911 had steam generators
Illinois Terminal Railroad	6	1600–1605	
Kansas City Southern Railway	8	155–162	
Kansas City Southern (Louisiana and Arkansas Railway)	5	150–154	
Kansas, Oklahoma and Gulf Railway	9	801–809	
Louisville and Nashville Railroad	61	400–440, 500–514, 501–502 (2nd), 550–552	
Maine Central Railroad	19	561–569, 571–580	566-569 were built with 567BC engines
Meridian and Bigbee Railroad	1	1	Renumbered 101
Midland Valley Railroad	4	151–154	
Minneapolis, St. Paul and Sault Ste. Marie Railroad ("Soo Line")	7	375–378, 381–383	
Missouri Pacific Railroad	208	4116–4194, 4197–4325	4116-4120, 4159-4165, 4203-4207, 4249-4253, 4284-4286, 4323-4324 owned by St. Louis, Brownsville and Mexico, 4121-4123, 4153-4158, 4197-4202, 4254-4255, 4287-4297, 4325 owned by International-Great Northern, 4290-4291, 4316-4320, 4325 were built with 567BC engines; 4292-4315, 4321-4324 were built with 567C engines.
Missouri–Kansas–Texas Railroad	33	1501–1529, 1761–1764	1700s had steam generators; Renumbered 91–123
Nashville, Chattanooga and St. Louis Railway	37	700–731, 750–754	700-705 built with EMD AAR TypeA trucks
Ferrocarriles Nacionales de México (National Railways of Mexico)	2	6600–6601	
New York Central Railroad	169	5600–5611, 5626-5675, 5686-5712, 5738-5817	Long-hood-forward
New York Central Railroad (Peoria and Eastern Railway)	14	5612-5625	Long-hood-forward
New York Central Railroad (Pittsburgh and Lake Erie Railroad)	35	5676-5685, 5713-5737	Long-hood-forward
New York, Chicago and St. Louis Railroad ("Nickel Plate Road")	48	400–447	
Northern Pacific Railway	20	550–569	to Burlington Northern Railroad 1624–1643; 560-569 were built with 567BC engines
Pennsylvania Railroad	66	8500–8512, 8545–8587, 8797–8806	Long-hood-forward
Phelps Dodge Corporation	7	1–2, 7–8, 27–29	
Portland Terminal Company Maine	1	1081	
Reading Company	44	600–636, 660–666	625-636 were built with 567BC engines; Long-hood-forward
Richmond, Fredericksburg and Potomac Railroad	4	101–104	
Seaboard Air Line Railroad	123	1700–1822	
Southern Railway	57	2063–2077, 2156–2197	
Southern Railway (Cincinnati, New Orleans and Texas Pacific Railway)	11	6200–6205, 6240–6244	
Southern Railway (Alabama Great Southern Railroad)	5	6540–6544	
Southern Railway (Georgia Southern and Florida Railway)	4	8210–8213	
St. Louis Southwestern Railway	1	320	Renumbered 304
St. Louis–San Francisco Railway	129	500–549, 555–632, 615 (2nd)	
Tennessee, Alabama and Georgia Railway	3	707–709	
Texas and Pacific Railway	21	1110–1130	
Texas Mexican Railway	3	850–852	
Toledo, Peoria and Western Railway	2	102–103	
Union Pacific Railroad	30	700–729	720-729 were built with 567BC engines
United States Army	20	1821–1840	Built with EMD AAR TypeA trucks; 12 later served on Alaska RR and 11 were retrucked with AAR Type B road trucks
Wabash Railroad	33	450–452, 454–483	453 built by GMD
Western Maryland Railway	4	20–23	
Western Pacific Railroad	13	701–713	
Western Railway of Alabama	6	521–526	
Totals	2,617 5	GP7 GP7B	

=== Locomotives built by General Motors Diesel, Canada ===
GP7 locomotives were built at GMD's London Ontario plant for domestic Canadian railway purchasers, and for some US railroads like the C&O and Wabash who owned and operated over trackage in Canada (specifically the southern Ontario area).

Owner	Quantity	Numbers	Notes
Algoma Central and Hudson Bay	21	150–170	
Canadian National Railways	25	4824, 7555–7578	4824 rebuilt October 1958 with parts from wrecked F3A. 7555-7578 renumbered to 4800-4823 mid-1957. Long-hood-forward
Canadian Pacific Railway	17	8409–8425	8410-8411 originally built with steam generators
Chesapeake and Ohio Railway	19	5720–5738	C&O 5720-5729 resold to NYC as 5818-5827 for their Canadian operations
Quebec North Shore and Labrador Railway	22	100–101, 104–123	
Toronto, Hamilton and Buffalo Railway	7	71–77	To CP (minus wrecked 71), all rebuilt as CP 1682-1687
Wabash Railroad	1	453	Later to N&W 3453
Total	112		

== Rebuilds, modifications and conversions ==
There are five GP7s on A J Kristopan's EMD Serial number page that reused previous serial numbers: B&O 6405 (preserved), CRI&P 1308 (2nd), L&N 501 (2nd) and 502 (2nd), and SLSF 615 (2nd). These rebuilt units were rebuilt as new on new frames. Another rebuild by GMD is that CN 4824 was rebuilt as a GP7 with parts from an F3A in October 1958.

Over 100 GP7s and four of the GP7Bs were built with 567BC or 567C engines starting in March 1953 through May 1954. These are noted on the roster above.

Many railroads rebuilt their GP7s with low short hoods; some railroads went further in their rebuilding than others. Missouri Pacific Railroad upgraded their GP7s with 567BC engines (a B-block upgraded to C-block specs) and replaced the standard EMD 2-stack exhaust with a 4-stack "liberated" exhaust, raising their power output to 1,600 horsepower (1.19 MW).

Illinois Central Railroad rebuilt most of its GP7s with 567BC engines, 4-stack exhausts, paper air-intake filters, 26-L brakes (their original 6-BL brakes made them operationally incompatible with locomotives fitted with 24-RL brakes). All but the first locomotive rebuilt had their front (short) hood reduced in height for improved crew visibility. The IC designated these rebuilt locomotives GP8. The IC acquired many second-hand units through Precision National Corporation (PNC), and then started offering their GP8/GP10 rebuilding services to other railroads through their Paducah Shops (note, a rebuilt "Paducah Geep" was designated a GP8 or GP10 depending on the power output of the rebuilt engine, not necessarily what it was rebuilt from).

In 1960 the Alaska Railroad purchased a dozen GP7Ls from the US Army and rebuilt eleven of them in 1965 with low short hoods for better visual clearance. One of the ten remaining Alaska GP7s was rebuilt by Morrison-Knudsen in 1976. The other nine units were rebuilt at Paducah Shops in 1976-1977.

Canadian Pacific Railway rebuilt their GP7 fleet in the early 1980's as GP7u units for yard service, including a chopped short hood, new number boards and front cab windows, and upgrading the 567B prime movers with 645 power assemblies and to "BC" engine block specs (some upgraded with 567C engine blocks out of retired F-units).

== Preservation ==
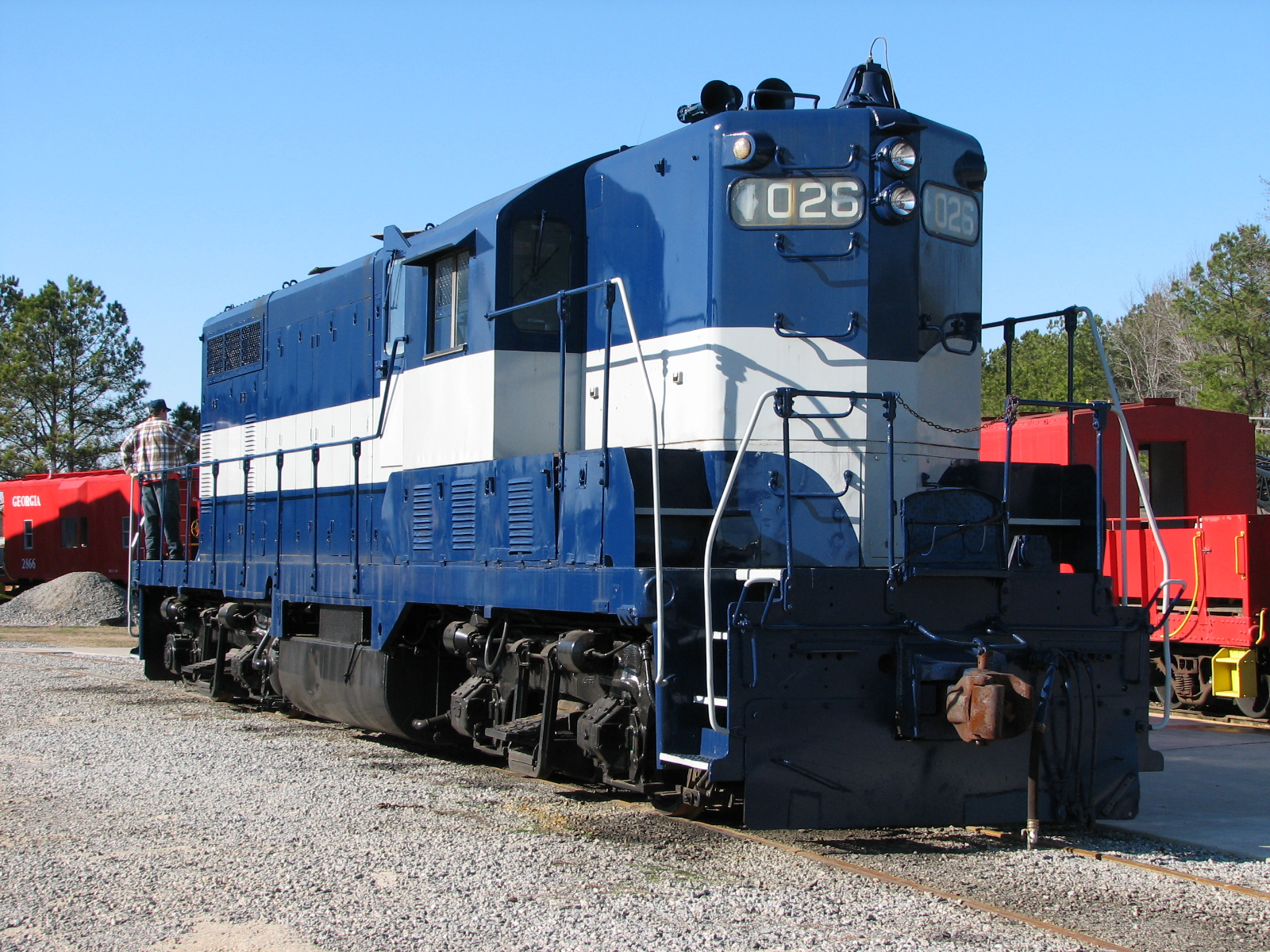
Georgia Railroad 1026, an EMD GP7 -- on permanent display in Duluth, Georgia.

Numerous GP7s have been preserved on tourist lines and in museums. Holders include:

- Conway Scenic Railroad
- Florida Railroad Museum
- Illinois Railway Museum
- Lebanon Mason Monroe Railroad
- Minnesota Transportation Museum
- Tennessee Valley Railroad Museum
- United Railroad Historical Society of New Jersey
- Western Pacific Railroad Museum
- Grand Canyon Railway
- Toronto Railway Museum
- Southeastern Railway Museum
- Stone Mountain Scenic Railroad
- Hocking Valley Scenic Railway
- Grapevine Vintage Railroad
- Conrad Yelvington Distributors Railroad

== See also ==
- List of GM-EMD locomotives
- List of GMD Locomotives
