= EMD BL2 =

Model of diesel-electric locomotive

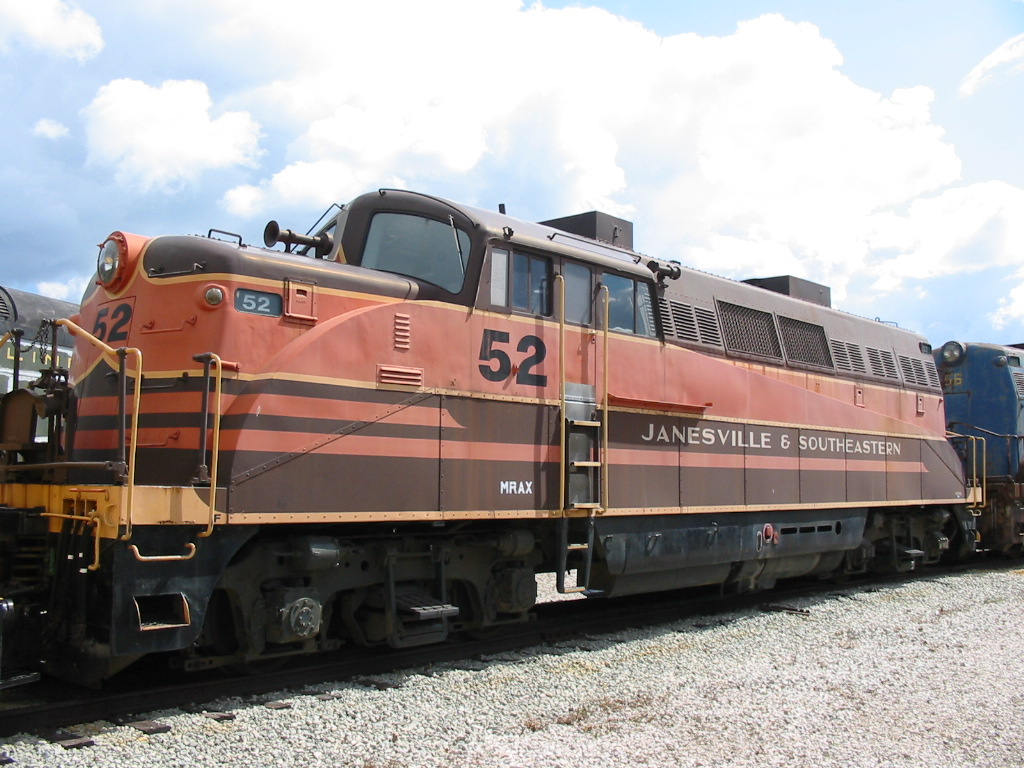
- Janesville & Southeastern #52 at the National Railroad Museum.
Type and origin
- Power type: Diesel-electric
- Builder: General Motors Electro-Motive Division (EMD)
- Model: BL2
- Build date: September 1947 – May 1949
- Total produced: 59
Specifications
- Configuration
  - AAR: B-B
- Gauge: 4 ft 8 1/2 in (1,435 mm)
- Prime mover: EMD 16-567B
- Engine type: V16
- Generator: EMD D-12A
- Traction motors: (4) EMD D-17-B or D-27-B
- Cylinders: 16
Performance figures
- Power output: 1,500 hp (1,100 kW)
- Tractive effort: 56,200 lbf (250 kN)
Career
- Operators: See "original Owners"
- Locale: United States

The EMD BL2 is a model of diesel-electric locomotive built by General Motors Electro-Motive Division (EMD). A total of 58 units (plus a single BL1) were built between 1947 and 1949. The BL2 was not very successful, as it was unreliable and occupied a gap between carbody and hood units, which resulted in it suffering from the drawbacks of both designs. However, lessons learned from the BL2 were incorporated into EMD's next design, the GP7.

== History ==
EMD's diesel program was well underway by the late 1940s thanks to the success of the company's F- and E-units. While the F-units in production were great for moving trains over the railroad, their full-width carbody made it difficult for locomotive crews to see to the rear of the locomotive while switching. This was considered an acceptable sacrifice for a mainline locomotive, which was expected to do little switch work, since the full-width carbody type was considered much more handsome and stylish. By 1948, competitors Alco, Baldwin, and Fairbanks-Morse had introduced road switcher locomotives, which used the narrow hood and full walkway of a switcher locomotive with a longer frame and the high-speed trucks of a road locomotive. These locomotives were successful at displacing steam from secondary services such as local and branch-line work.

EMD developed the BL1, basing it on the F3 and using the same bridge-truss carbody construction as the F-unit (as opposed to the weight-bearing frame of a true road switcher locomotive like the Alco RS-1) with the body cut away behind the cab to provide visibility to the rear. The first BL1 was EMD Demonstrator #499, built in September 1947. The BL1 Demonstrator was EMD Project 89499, thus the 499 Demonstrator number. The BL in the model name stood for "Branch Line", indicating that EMD felt the locomotive was best suited for light traffic and frequent switching chores. The BL1 was built with a light-weight underframe and draft gear and no multiple unit (MU) capabilities, as it was expected to operate as a single unit. However, MU capability was later added to the BL1.

In response to feedback from the railroads, the visually-identical BL2 was built with a heavier frame and draft gear and MU capability. The production BL2 used the standard Woodward, Inc. electro-hydraulic governor and notched throttle as used in the F3 (as opposed to the air-actuated throttle with which the BL1 was originally built). The BL2 could be equipped with a train-heating steam generator for passenger service, identified by an exhaust stack between the panes of the front windshield. The B&M, C&O and Rock Island ordered such units.

Limiting the locomotive's success were several mechanical and ergonomic drawbacks. The BL2 was expensive and time-consuming to build because of its unique carbody design. Rather than being built in small segments which could be moved to another area for final assembly, the BL2 had to be built entirely in once place. The mechanical components in the engine compartment were difficult to access and maintain, reducing its appeal among railroad shop crews. The locomotive's carbody lacked the full-length walkways of a true switch engine (a mistake not repeated on the subsequent "GP" series of diesels or other road switchers), making it difficult for the brakeman or switchman to move from one point on the locomotive to another during switching operations. Finally, although the industrial designers at EMD tried to build a carbody that evoked high-class passenger trains while retaining the utilitarianism of railroad work, the design never became popular. EMD applied the lessons learned from the BL2's lack of success in developing the GP7.

== Original owners ==
Railroad	Quantity	Road Number
Bangor and Aroostook	8	550-557 (later 50-57)
Boston and Maine Railroad	4	1550–1553
Chesapeake and Ohio Railway¹	14	80-85 (Ordered by Pere Marquette Railroad prior to merger), 1840–1847
Chicago and Eastern Illinois Railroad	2	1600-1601 (later 200-201)
Chicago, Indianapolis and Louisville Railway ("Monon")	9	30-38
Chicago, Rock Island and Pacific Railroad	5	425-429
Electro Motive Division	1	499 (BL1 demo, sold to C&EI 1602, later 202)
Florida East Coast Railway	6	601-606
Missouri Pacific Railroad	8	4104-4111
Western Maryland Railway	2	81-82
Total	59	

== Preservation ==
The following BL2s have been preserved:

- Monon #32; Kentucky Railway Museum .
- Western Maryland Railway #81; Baltimore and Ohio Railroad Museum , Baltimore, Maryland.
- Western Maryland Railroad #82; Durbin and Greenbrier Valley Railroad .
- Janesville & Southeastern #52, ex-Bangor and Aroostook #52; née-Bangor and Aroostook #552; operated on Saratoga and North Creek Railway #52 . To be leased to Hoosier Valley Railroad Museum as of June 2021.
- Bangor and Aroostook #54; Lackawaxen and Stourbridge Railroad , Honesdale, Pennsylvania.
- Bangor and Aroostook #56; currently owned by Saratoga and North Creek Railway #56 . Formerly Janesville, Wisconsin. Leased to Hoosier Valley Railroad Museum in operational condition as of September 2023.
- Bangor and Aroostook #557; Cole Transportation Museum , Bangor, Maine.

== Additional Reading ==
- Pinkepank, Jerry A. (1973). The Second Diesel Spotter's Guide. Kalmbach Publishing Co., Milwaukee, WI. ISBN 0-89024-026-4.
- Dover, Dan; Skinger, Ed; Cuisinier, Win. "BL2..... A Final Study". Extra 2200 South (46): 20–24. Drawings by Win Cuisinier (Preston Cook).
