= Manchester Locomotive Works =

US locomotive manufacturer from 1855 to 1913

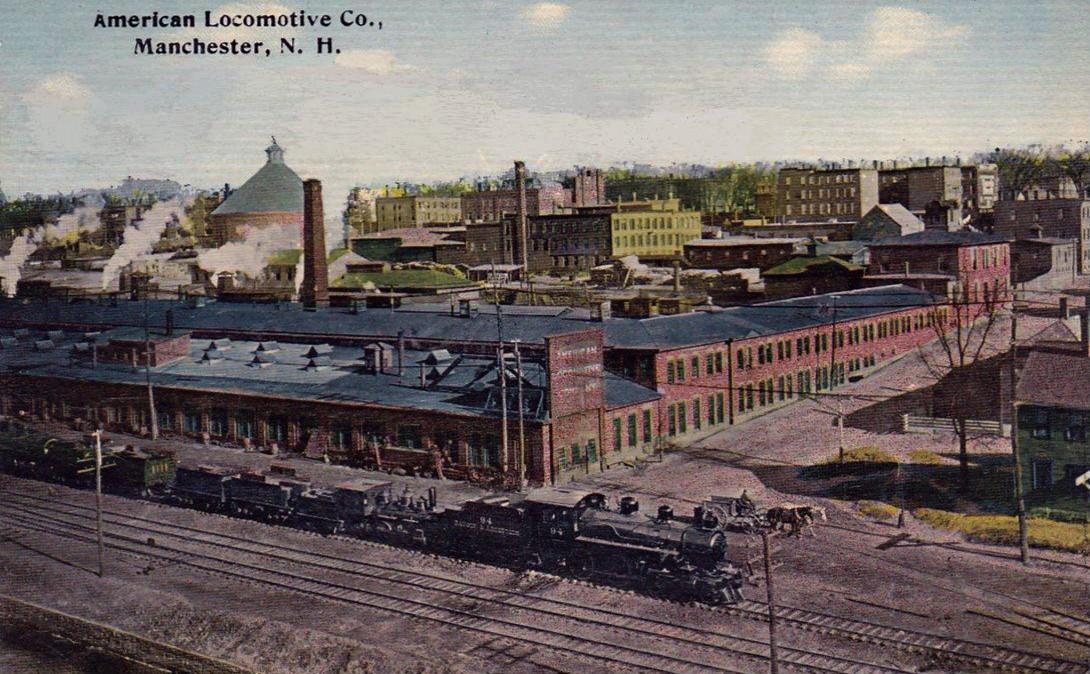
The plant in 1912.

Manchester Locomotive Works was a manufacturing company located in Manchester, New Hampshire, that built steam locomotives and fire engines in the 19th century. The first locomotive the company built was for the Chicago, Burlington and Quincy Railroad in March 1855.

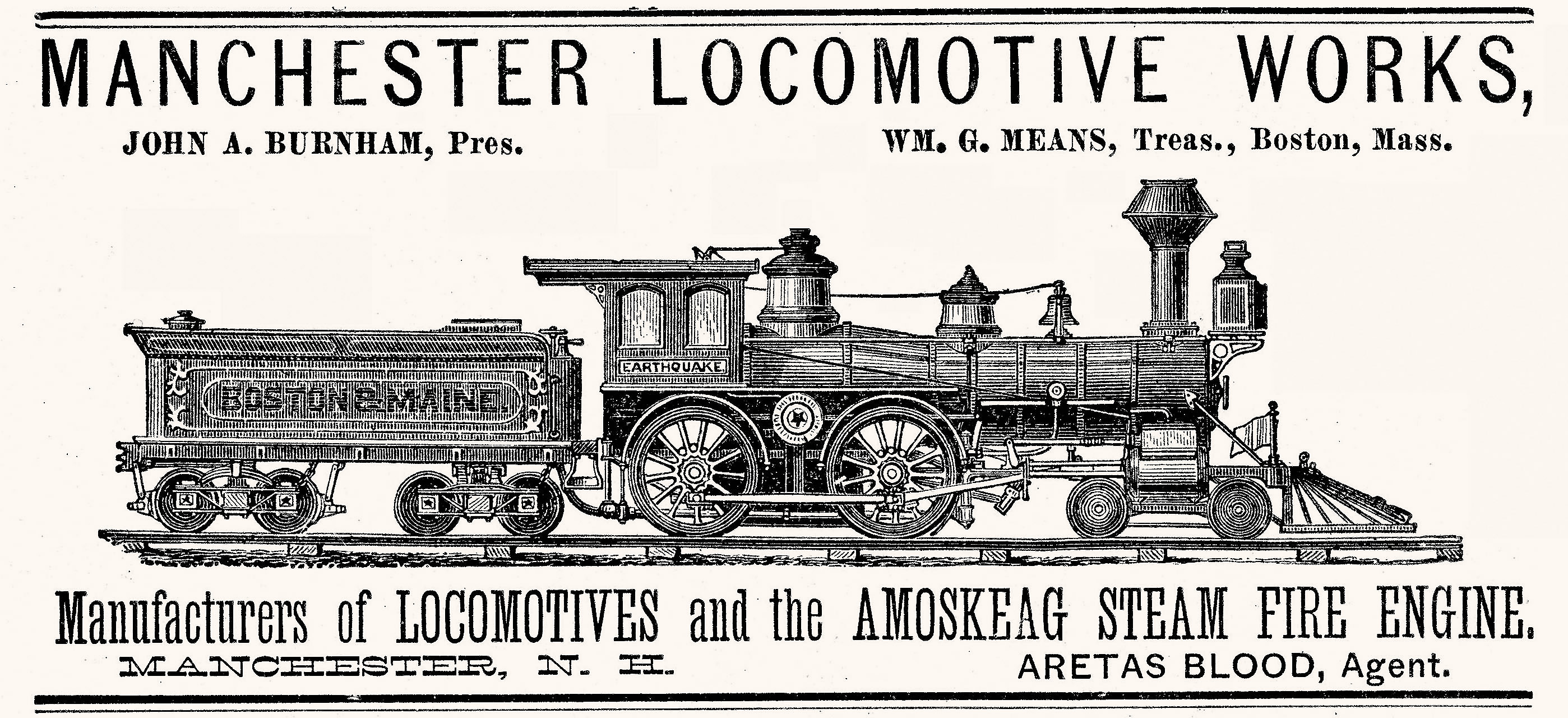
1882 advertisement for the Manchester Locomotive Works

Manchester purchased the locomotive manufacturing operation from the Amoskeag Locomotive Works in 1859. It acquired the steam fire engine business from Amoskeag Locomotive in 1876.

In 1901, Manchester and seven other locomotive manufacturing firms merged to form American Locomotive Company (ALCO). Locomotive production ceased in 1913.

== Preserved Manchester locomotives ==
The following locomotives (listed in serial number order) built by Manchester before the ALCO merger have been preserved. All locations are in the United States unless otherwise noted.

Serial number	Wheel arrangement (Whyte notation)	Build date	Operational owner(s)	Disposition
unknown	0-2-2-0 (cog)	1875	Mount Washington Cog Railway #2	Mount Washington Cog Railway, Mount Washington, New Hampshire
unknown	0-2-2-0 (cog)	1878	Mount Washington Cog Railway #6	Mount Washington Cog Railway, Mount Washington, New Hampshire
unknown	0-2-2-0 (cog)	1883	Mount Washington Cog Railway #1	Mount Washington Cog Railway, Mount Washington, New Hampshire
unknown	0-2-2-0 (cog)	1883	Mount Washington Cog Railway #3	Mount Washington Cog Railway, Mount Washington, New Hampshire
unknown	0-2-2-0 (cog)	1883	Mount Washington Cog Railway #4	Mount Washington Cog Railway, Mount Washington, New Hampshire
unknown	0-2-2-0 (cog)	1892	Mount Washington Cog Railway #8	Mount Washington Cog Railway, Mount Washington, New Hampshire
1546	4-4-0	July 1892	Boston and Maine Railroad #494	Union Station, White River Junction, Vermont
unknown	0-4-0	ca. 1870s	Edison Cement Corporation #unknown	Purchased by Henry Ford in 1932 and rebuilt as a 4-4-0, currently operating at Greenfield Village, Dearborn, Michigan
unknown	4-4-0	ca. 1880s	Unknown #unknown	Discovered buried and unearthed in Mulberry, Florida in 2012, missing significant components such as cab, smokebox, pilot truck and tender. On display at the Mulberry Phosphate Museum.
49722	0-6-0	1911	Boston and Maine Railroad #410	On display in Lowell, Massachusetts at 410 Dutton St. Now owned by the Lowell Historic Preservation Commission.
44369	2-6-0	November 1907	Boston and Maine Railroad #1455	Danbury Railroad Museum, Danbury, Connecticut
