= Classification yard =

Rail yard for sorting and assembling rail vehicles into trains

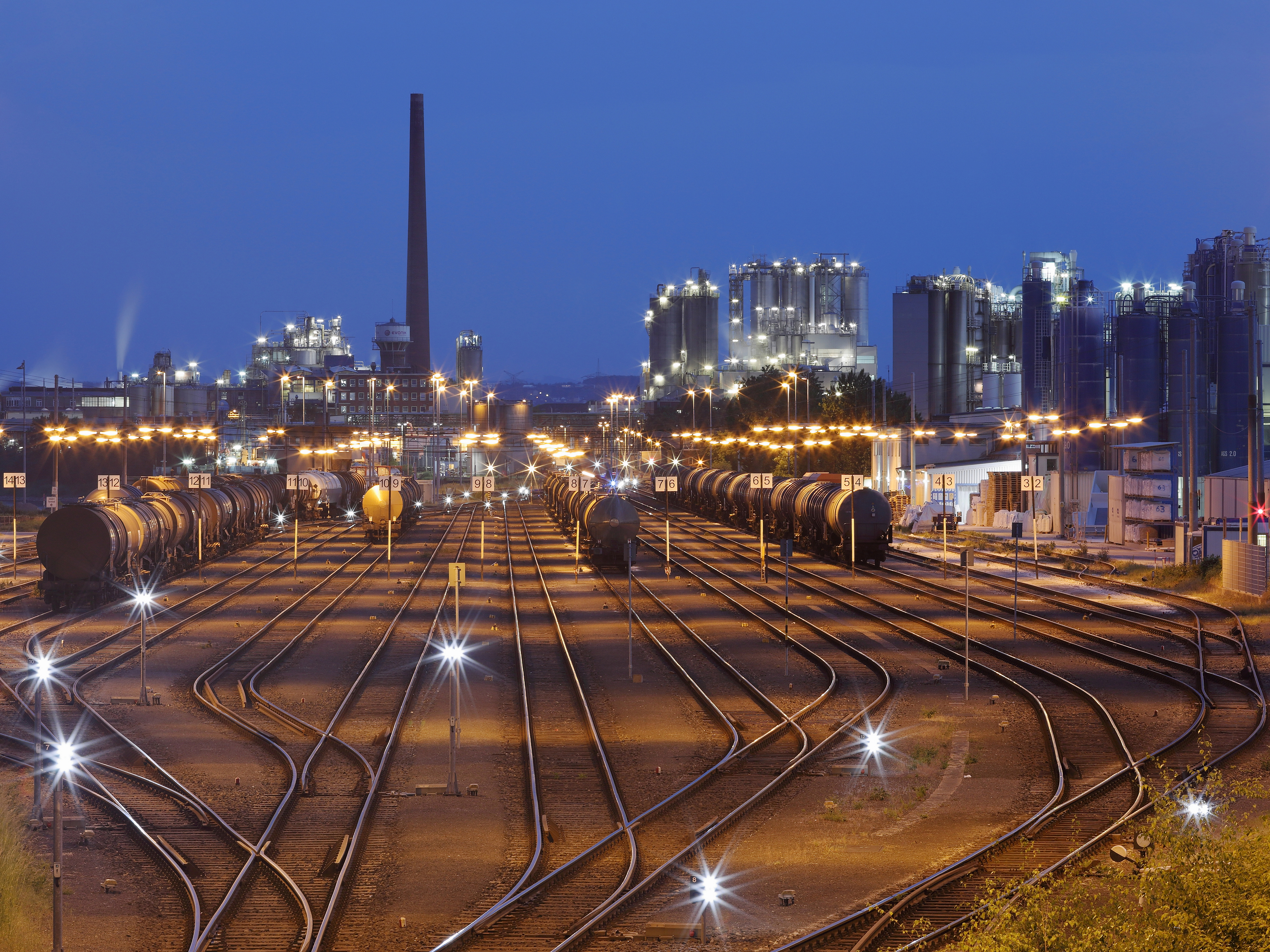
Godorf Station, Cologne, Germany

A classification yard (American English, as well as the Canadian National Railway), marshalling yard (British, Hong Kong, Indian, and Australian English, and the former Canadian Pacific Railway) or shunting yard (Central Europe) is a railway yard used to accumulate wagons or railway cars on one of several tracks. First, a group of cars is taken to a track, sometimes called a lead or a drill. From there, the cars are sent through a series of points or switches (turnouts), termed a ladder, on to the classification tracks. Some larger yards may put the lead on an artificially built hill termed a hump to use the force of gravity to propel the cars through the ladder.

Freight trains that consist of unrelated cars must be made into a train grouped according to their destinations; this shunting is done at the starting point. Some trains (US: "wayfreights") drop and pick up cars along their route in classification yards or at industrial sidings. This is in contrast is a single-product unit train that carries, for example, automobiles from the factory to a port, or coal from a mine to the power plant.

== Flat ==
Flat yards, built on level ground, allow freight cars to coast to the desired location after receiving a push by a locomotive.

== Gravity ==
Gravity yards were invented in the 19th century, saving shunting engines and instead letting the cars roll by gravity was seen as a major benefit, whereas the larger amount of manual work required to stop the rolling cars in the classification tracks was judged to be not that important. Gravity yards were a historical step in the development of classification yards. They were later judged as inferior to hump yards because it became clear that shunting engines were needed anyway (at least in inclement weather like strong winds or icy temperatures when the oil in the bearings became thick) and because manual labor was becoming increasingly expensive. Thus, only a few gravity yards were ever built, sometimes requiring massive earthwork (one example is the first German gravity yard at Dresden). The historic technique of a gravity yard is today partly presented in Chemnitz-Hilbersdorf gravity yard (museum).

Most gravity yards were built in Germany (especially in the kingdom of Saxony) and Great Britain (such as Edgehill, 1873), a few also in some other European countries, for example Łazy yard near Zawiercie on the Warsaw–Vienna Railway (in Poland). In the US, there were very few old gravity yards; one of the few gravity yards in operation today is CSX's Readville Yard south of Boston, Massachusetts.

== Hump ==
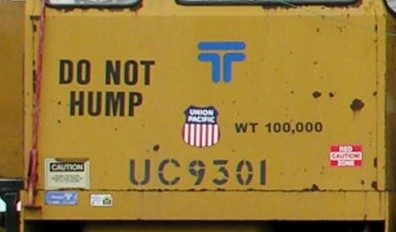
Not all cars can be sent over a classification hump. This Union Pacific track maintenance vehicle is permanently labeled "Do not hump" because it is not designed to withstand hump sorting.

Hump yards are the largest and most effective classification yards, with the largest shunting capacity, often several thousand cars a day. They work similarly to gravity yards, but the falling gradient is limited to a small part of the yard, namely the hump. It is the heart of the yard—a lead track on a small hill over which an engine pushes the cars. Single cars, or a block of coupled cars, are uncoupled at or just before the crest of the hump and roll by gravity onto their destination tracks in the area of the yard where the cars are sorted, called the classification bowl. The first hump in Germany (Leipzig) was built in 1858 and in France (Saint-Etienne) in 1863.

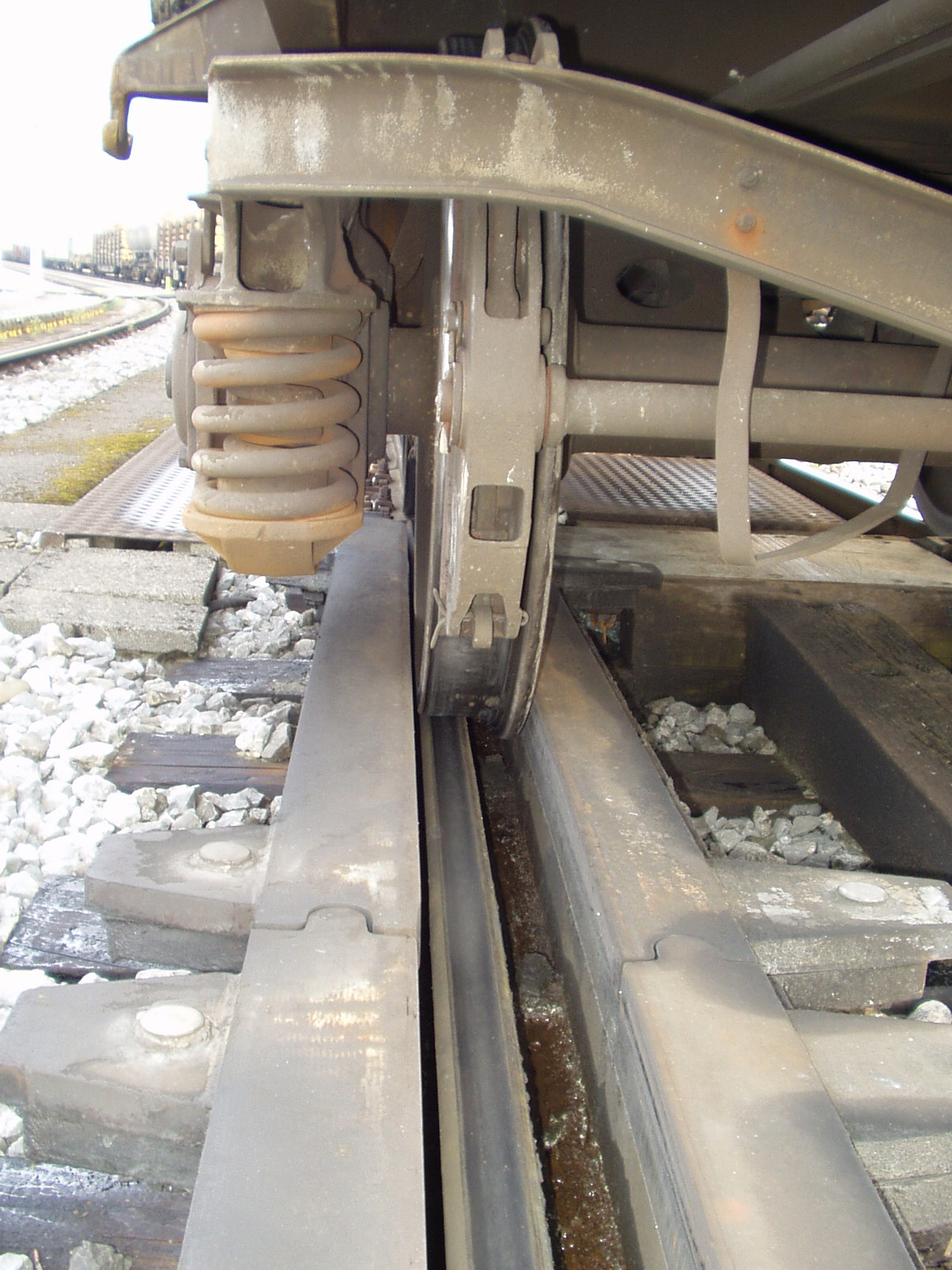
The retarders grip the sides of the wheels on passing cars to slow them down.

The speed of the cars rolling down from the hump into the classification bowl must be regulated according to whether they are full or empty, heavy or light freight, varying number of axles, whether there are few or many cars on the classification tracks, and varying weather conditions, including temperature, wind speed, and direction. In regard to speed regulation, there are two types of hump yards—with or without mechanization by retarders. In the old non-retarder yards, braking was usually done in Europe by railroaders who laid skates onto the tracks. The skate or wheel chock was manually (or, in rare cases, mechanically) placed on one or both of the rails so that the treadles or rims of the wheel or wheels caused frictional retardation and resulted in the halting of the railway car. In the United States, riders in cars did this braking. In modern retarder yards, this work is done by mechanized "rail brakes," called retarders, which brake cars by gripping their wheels. They are operated either pneumatically or hydraulically. Pneumatic systems are prevalent in the United States, France, Belgium, Russia and China, while hydraulic systems are used in Germany, Italy and the Netherlands.

Classification bowls in Europe typically consist of 20 to 40 tracks, divided into several fans or balloons of tracks, usually with eight classification tracks following a retarder in each one, often 32 tracks altogether. In the United States, many classification bowls have more than 40 tracks, frequently divided into six to ten classification tracks in each balloon loop.

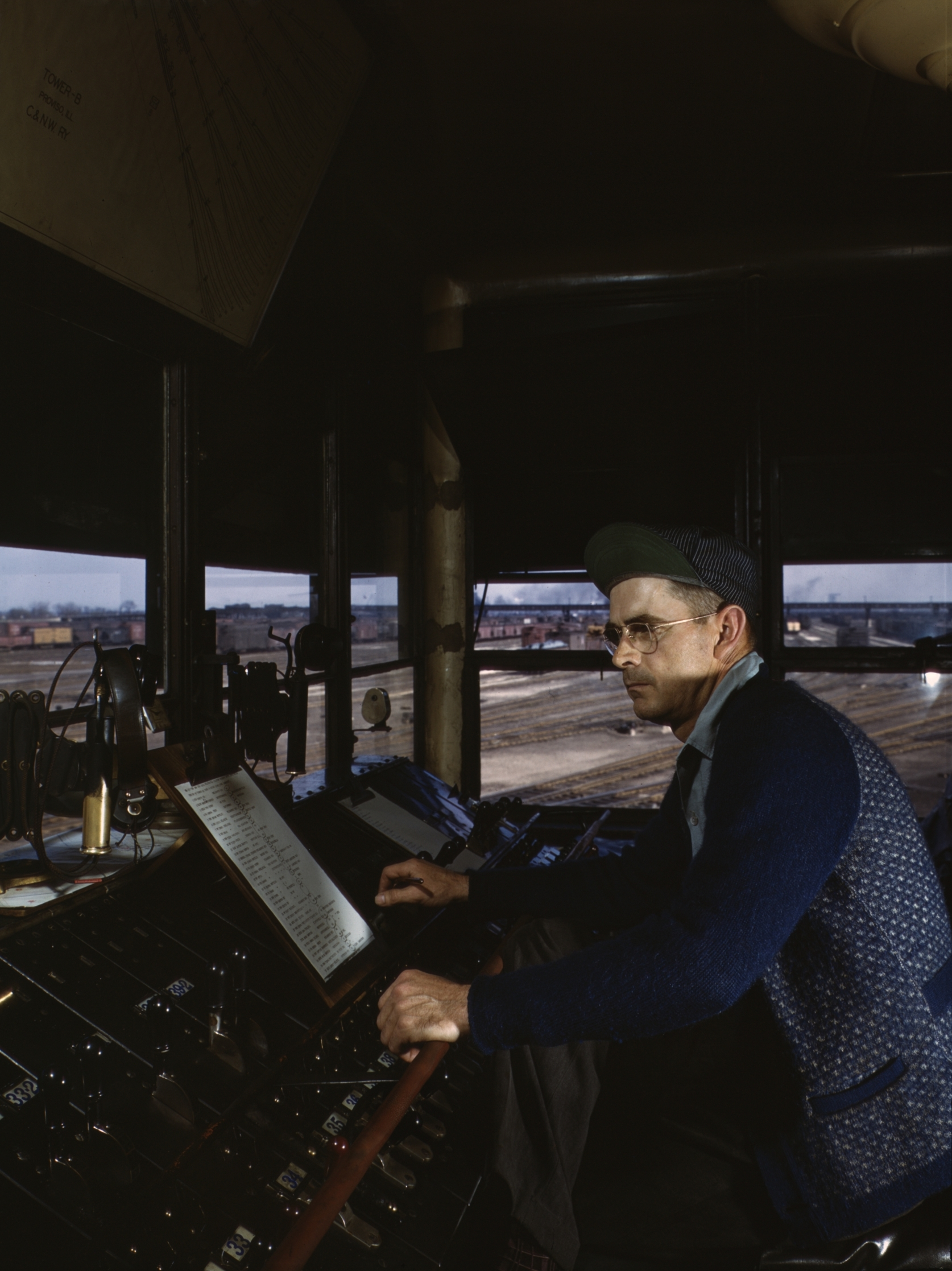
A CNW towerman operates the retarders at Proviso Yard in Chicago, Illinois (1943)

Bailey Yard in North Platte, Nebraska, United States, the world's largest classification yard, is a hump yard. Other large American hump yards include Argentine Yard in Kansas City, Kansas, Robert Young Yard in Elkhart, Indiana, Clearing Yard in Chicago, Illinois, Englewood Yard in Houston, Texas, and Waycross Rice Yard in Waycross, Georgia. Notably, in Europe, Russia, and China, all major classification yards are hump yards. Europe's largest hump yard is that of Maschen near Hamburg, Germany; it is only slightly smaller than Bailey Yard. The second largest is in the port of Antwerp, Belgium. Most hump yards are single yards with one classification bowl, but some, mostly very large, hump yards have two of them, one for each direction, and thus are double yards, such as the Maschen, Antwerp, Clearing, and Bailey yards.

Almost all gravity yards have been retrofitted with humps and are worked as hump yards. Examples include Chemnitz Hilbersdorf (today Saxon Railway Museum), Dresden Friedrichstadt and Nürnberg (Nuremberg) Rbf (Rbf: Rangierbahnhof, "classification yard"), in Germany.

== Unique locomotives ==
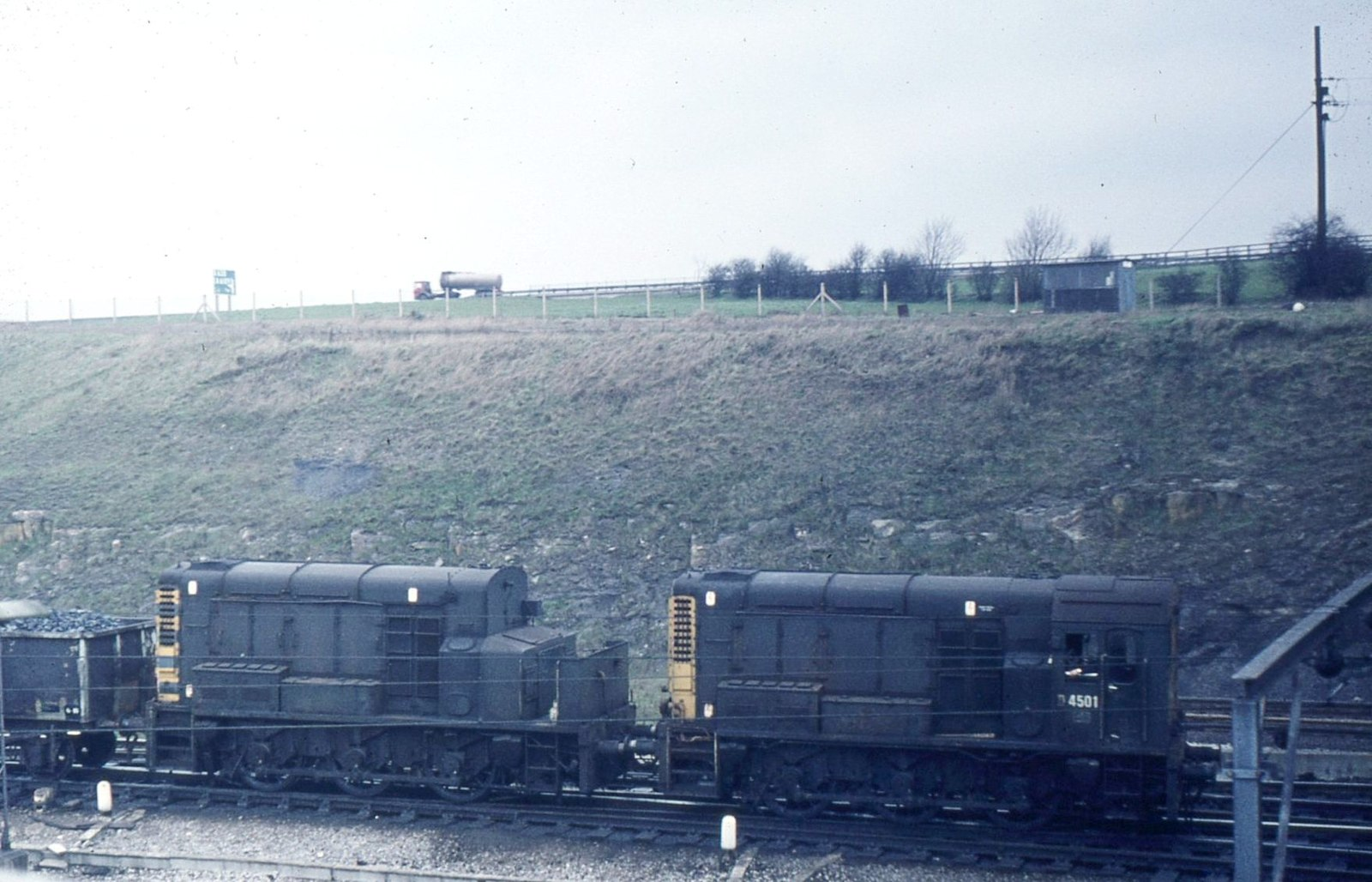
British Rail Class 13 permanently coupled pair at a hump yard

Hump yards sometimes require purpose-built or adapted shunting locomotives (US:switchers) if the chassis of mainline locomotives are so long that they cannot clear the railheads over the hump. British Rail, for example, permanently coupled pairs of Class 08 diesel shunting locomotives (Note: The pairs were delineated as Class 13.) to achieve the required tractive effort. In a classic master and slave (US: cow and calf) configuration, the slave unit had its cab removed and both units received added weight to improve traction. Special locomotives for hump yards in the US include the EMD TR family. (Note: EMD TR, EMD TR1, EMD TR2, EMD TR3, EMD TR4, EMD TR5 and EMD TR6.)

== Image gallery ==
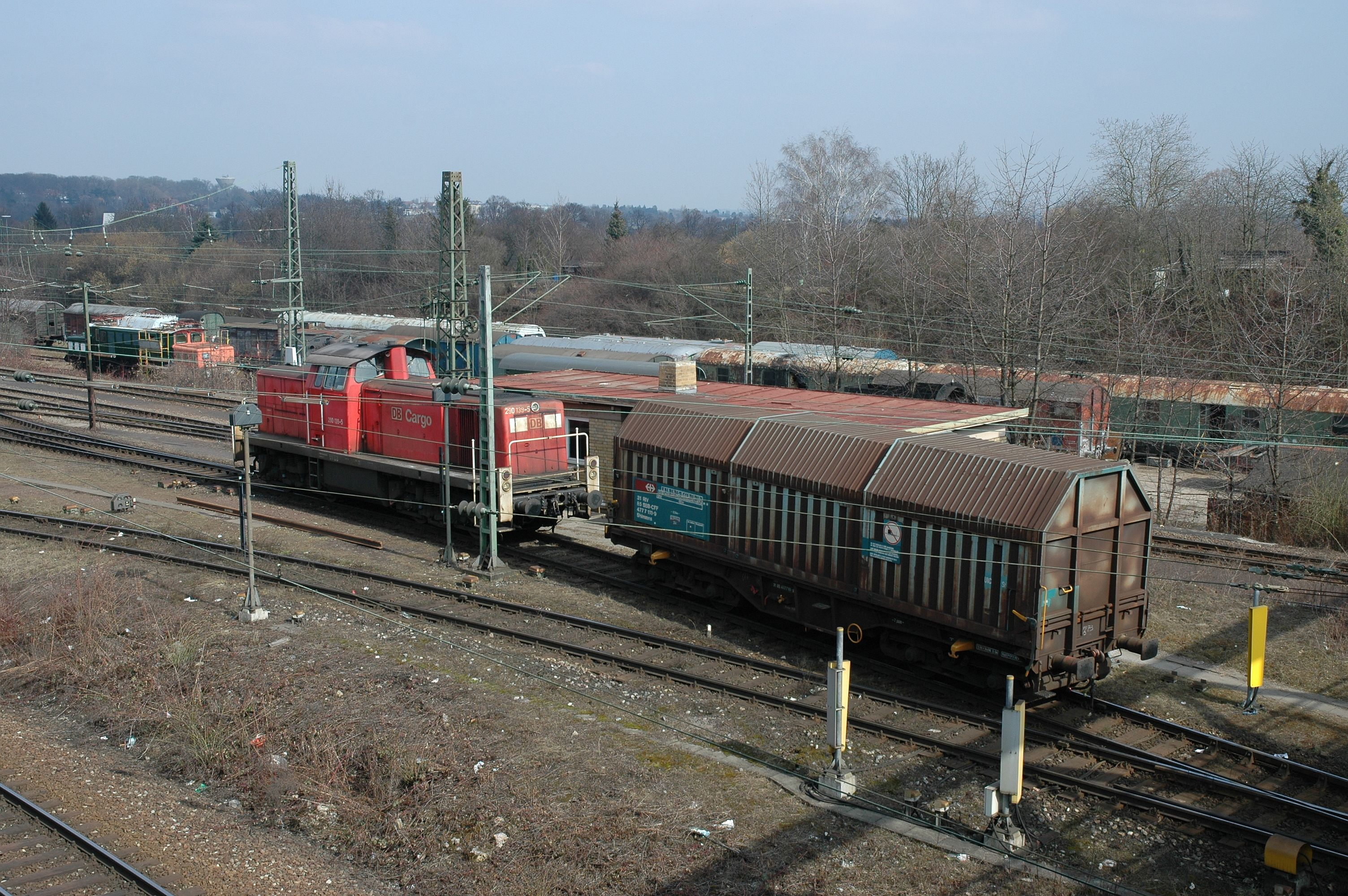
A switcher locomotive pushing a car over the hump at Kornwestheim yard

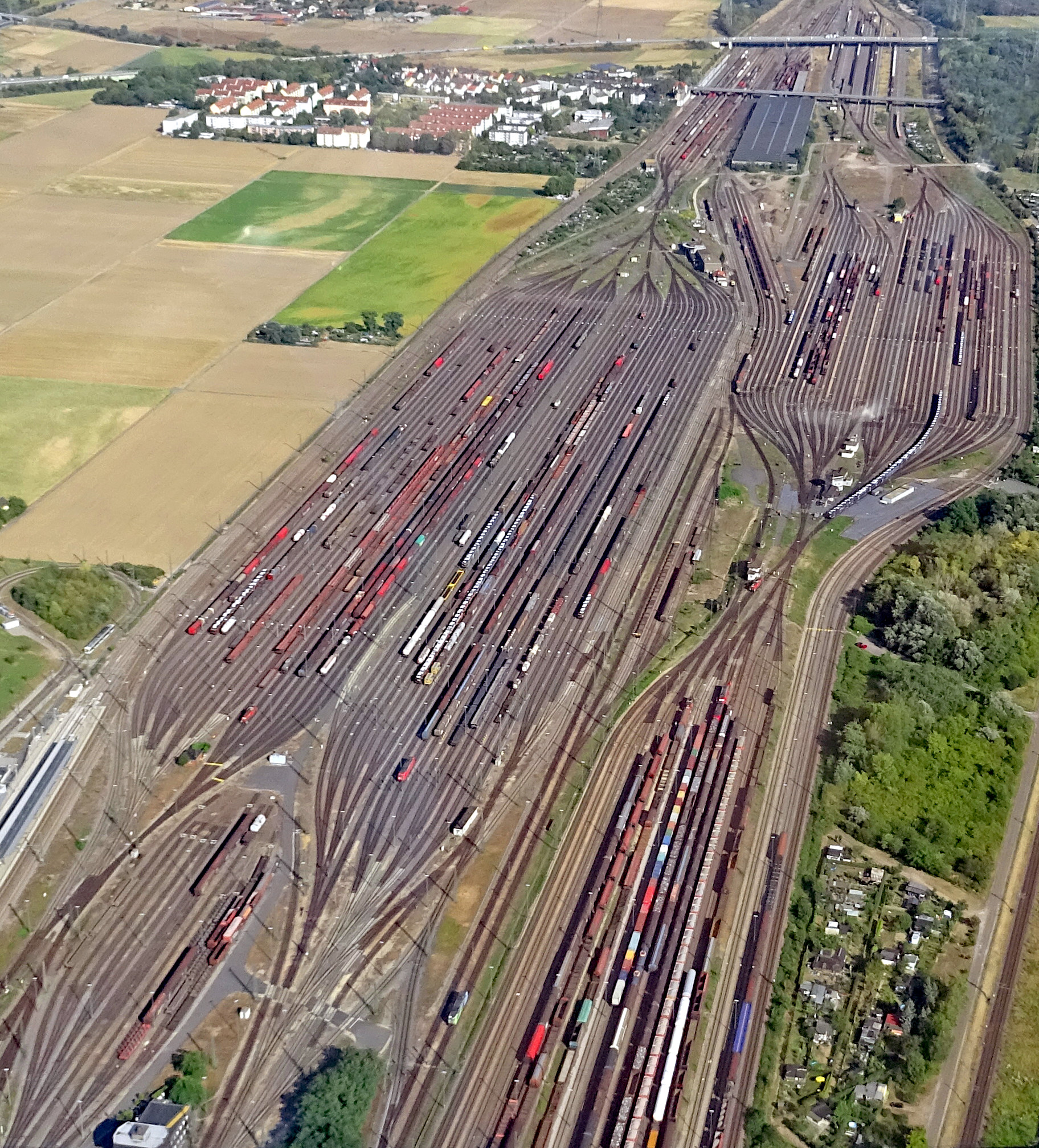
Mannheim Rangierbahnhof, Germany, two-sided nearly symmetrical systems for opposing directions

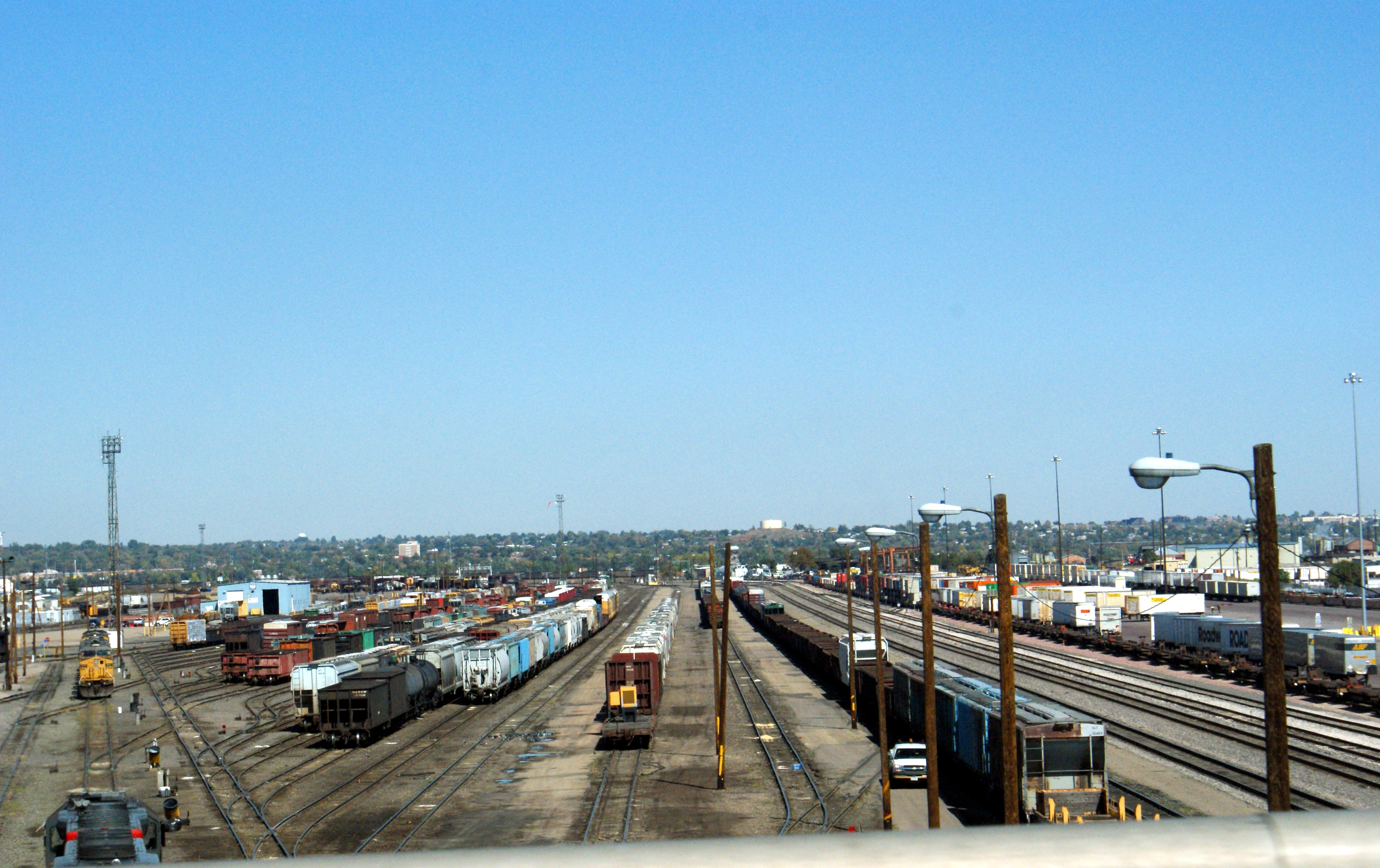
North Yard in Denver, Colorado, a typical U.S. classification yard in 2009

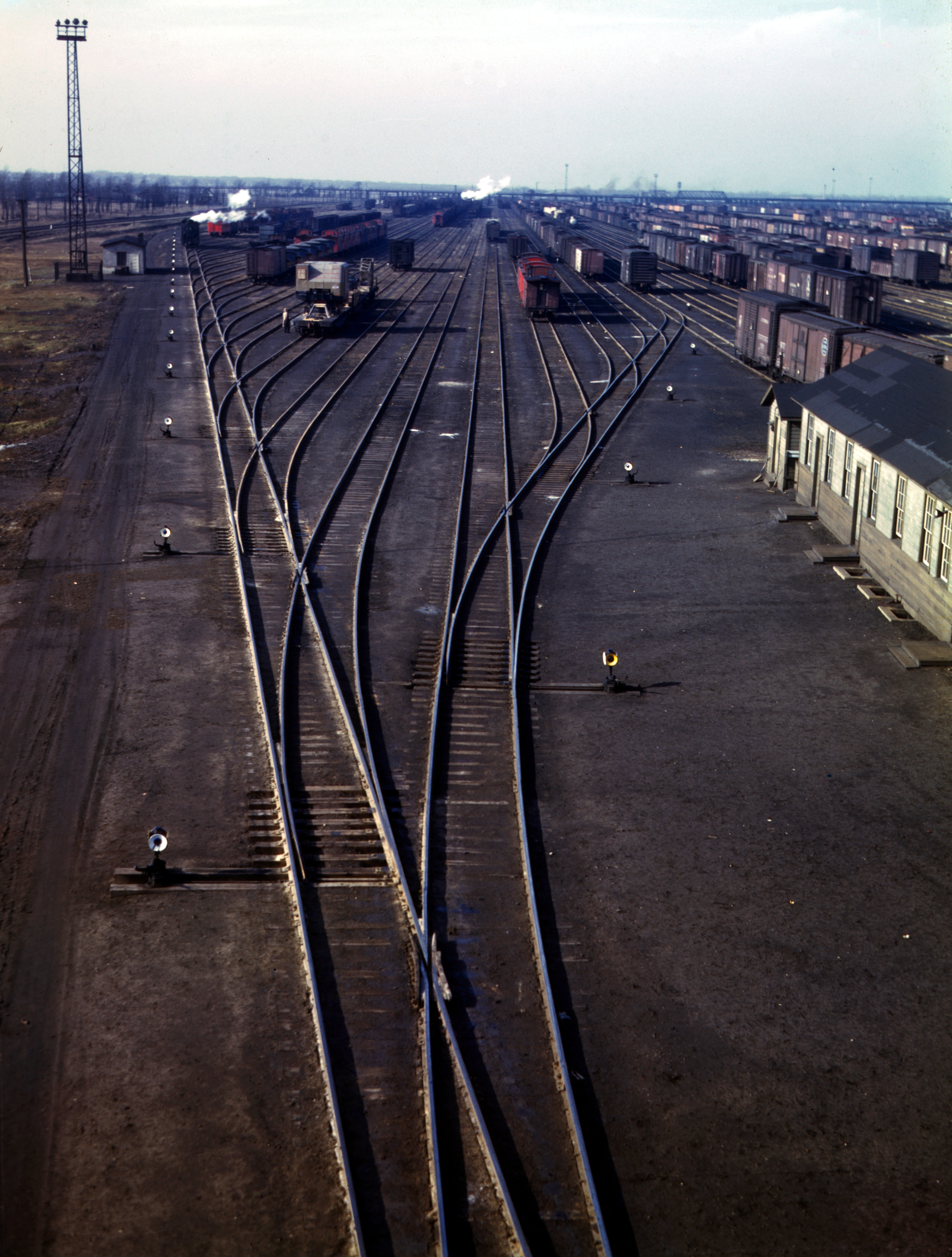
Chicago and North Western Railway's Proviso Yard in Chicago, Illinois, December 1942

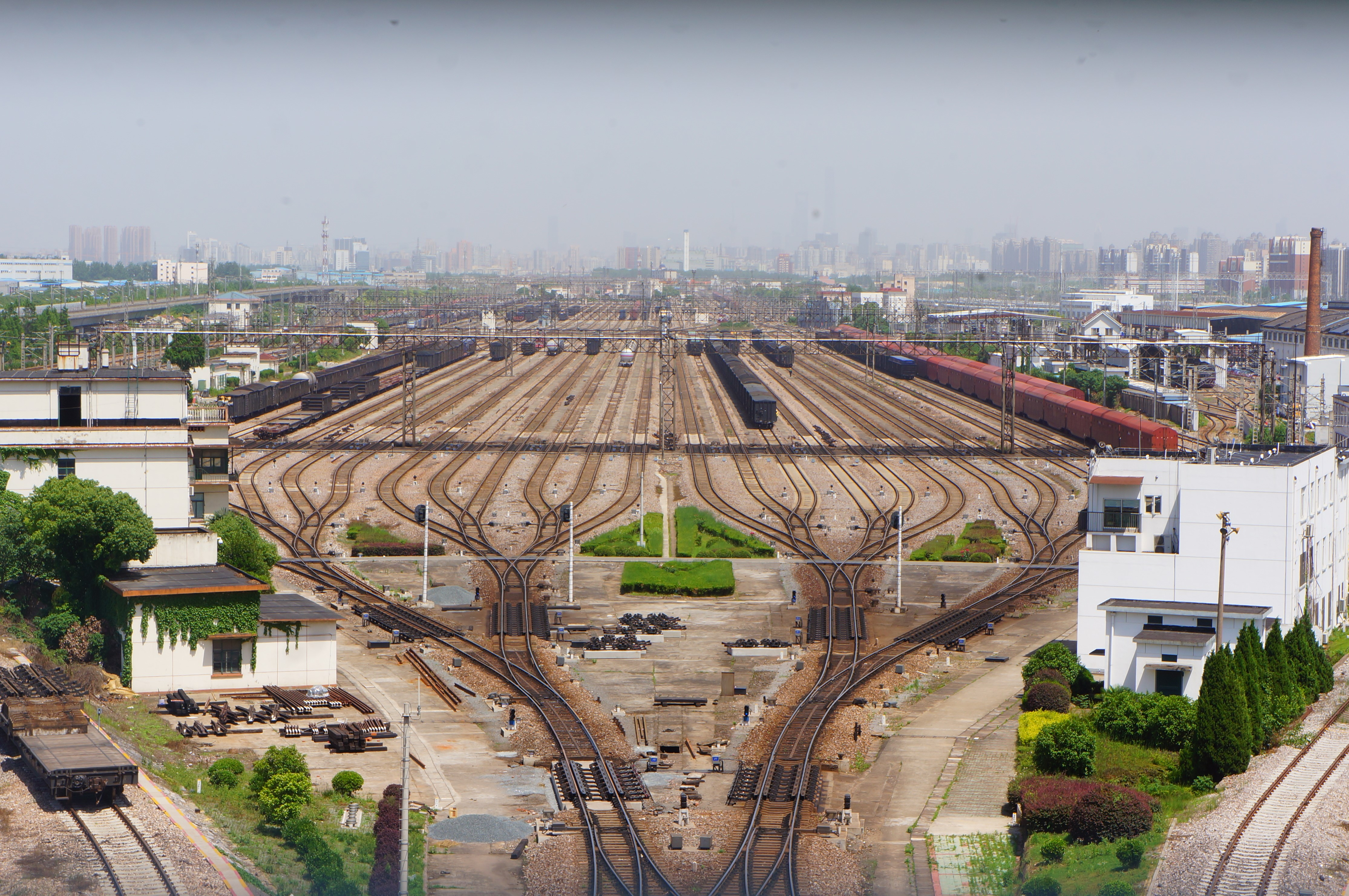
Nanxiang Classification Yard in Shanghai, China

== See also ==
- List of rail yards
- Siding (rail)
