= Cow–calf =

Pair of switcher locomotives

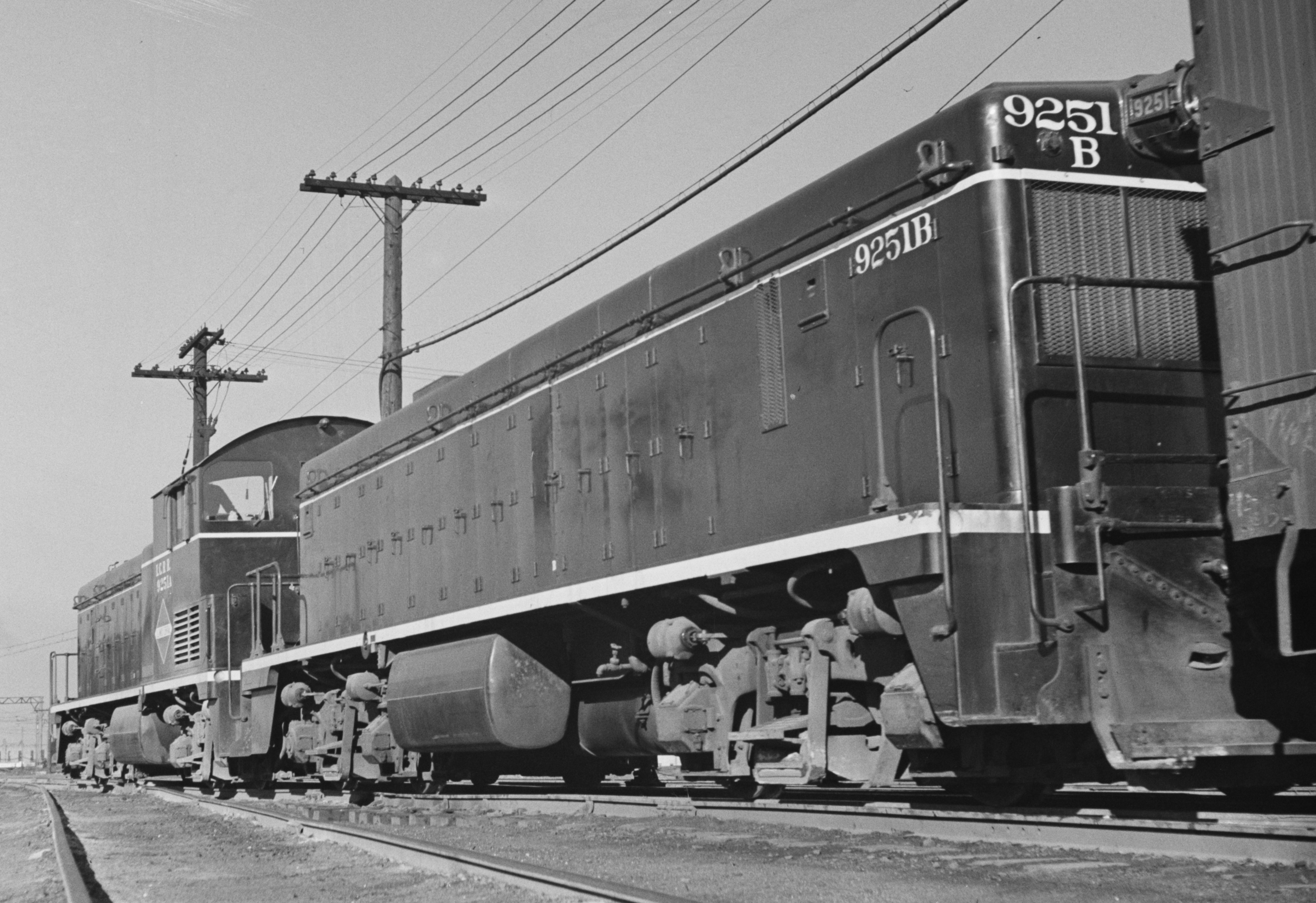
EMD TR1 diesel locomotive with two units—cow and calf

In rail transport, a cow–calf (also cow and calf, or in the UK master and slave) is a set of diesel switcher locomotives. The set is usually a pair, though a few three-unit sets (with two calves, also known as herds) were built. A cow is equipped with a cab, and a calf is not. The two are coupled together (either with regular couplers or a semi-permanent drawbar) and equipped with multiple unit train control so that both locomotives can be operated from the single cab.

A cow is analogous to an A unit, i.e. a locomotive with a cab, and a calf to a B unit, i.e. a powered, cabless road locomotive. That is, the cow and calf are each equipped with at least one prime mover for propulsion. A cow–calf set is distinct from a slug-and-mother set in that a cow and a calf are each independently powered while a slug has no prime mover and instead is dependent on power from its mother unit. Like the early EMD FT locomotives, cow–calf sets were typically built as mated pairs, with the cow and calf sharing a number. However this was not always the case, as over time many of the sets were broken up and couplers added to aid with versatility.

Most cow–calf sets were built by Electro-Motive Division (EMD), although other examples were built by the American Locomotive Company, Baldwin Locomotive Works, and British Rail (the last by combining existing locomotives together). Cow–calf sets were made obsolete by the development of road switcher locomotives, which could handle both mainline trains and switching duties.

== Distinctions between cow–calf, B units, and slugs ==
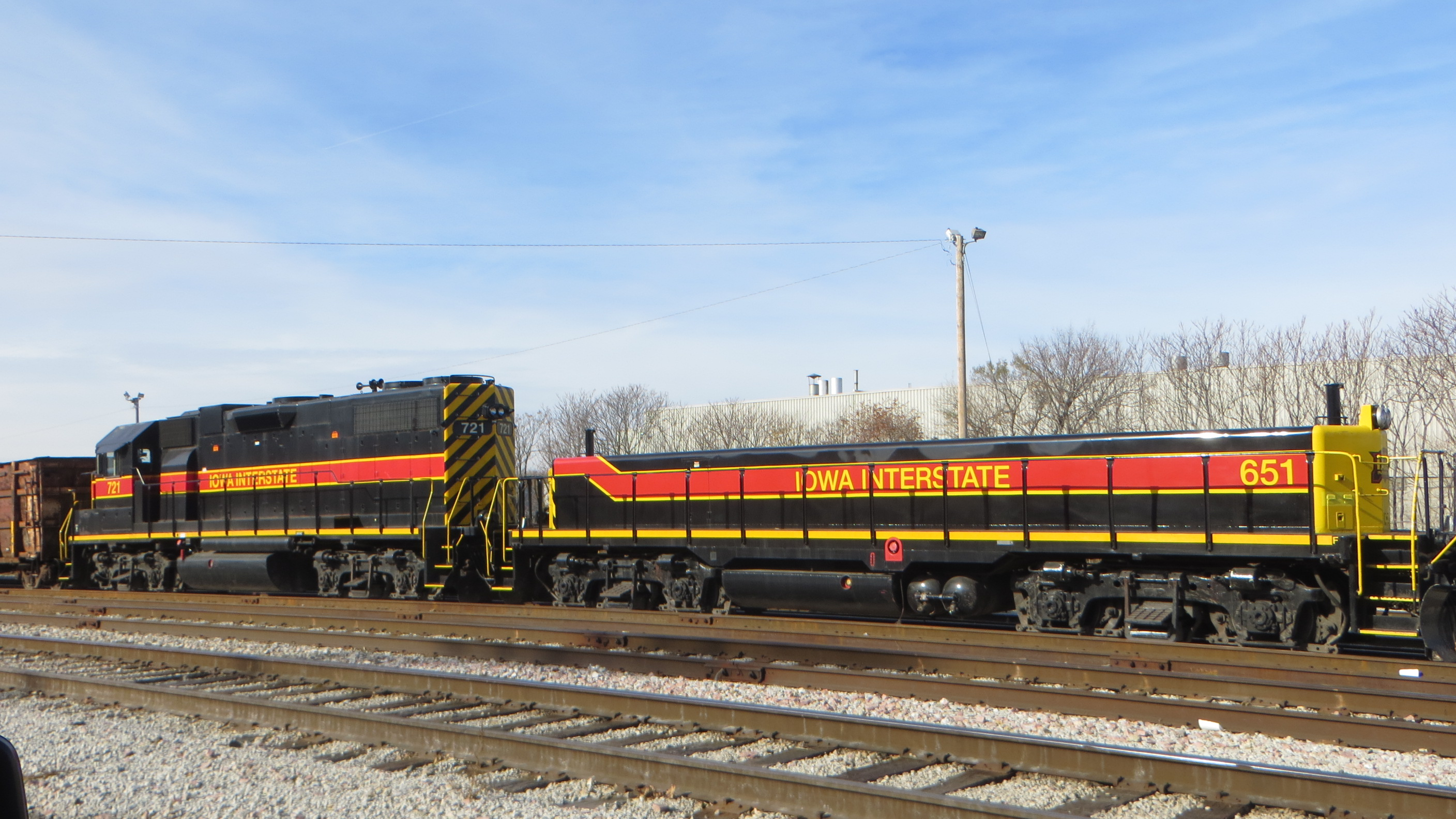
This locomotive and slug of the Iowa Interstate Railroad resemble a cow–calf set, but the slug has no engines of its own; this allows it to be cut down for better visibility.

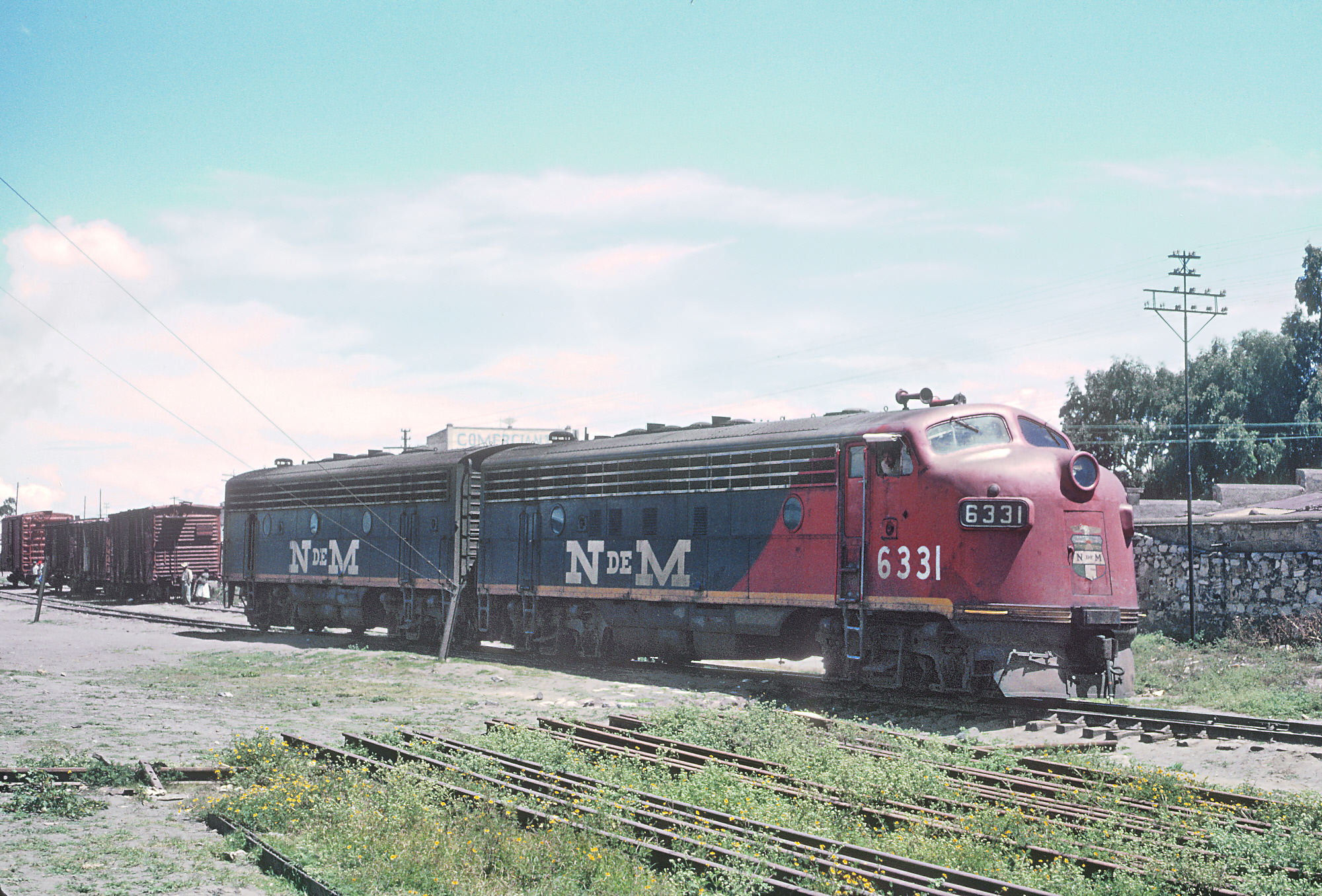
These EMD FP9 locomotives also resemble a cow and calf, but the B unit is designed for mainline speeds, and to be detachable and operate with any other locomotive.

Calves are similar to slugs (cut-down locomotives which do not have their own engines, but may have control cabs) and especially B units (powered booster locomotives which do not have cabs). A calf differs in that a B unit and a slug are both designed to operate with any other locomotives, while a cow–calf set was meant to be semi-permanently coupled to each other and operated together. They were usually connected by drawbars, though some cow–calf sets used standard couplers instead.

A slug is semi-permanently paired with a cabbed unit, but does not have its own engine. At low speeds, many diesel–electric locomotives can generate more electrical current than can be used by their motors. Slugs use this excess current to power their traction motors. In contrast, all units in a cow–calf set have their own engines.

== History ==
=== Design and nomenclature ===
In a cow–calf set, cow refers to the locomotive equipped with a cab, while calf refers to a unit without a cab. A cow–calf set with two calves is known as a herd; the only examples of this were two TR3 series sets ordered by the Chesapeake and Ohio Railway. The cow, calf, and herd designations were nicknames.

Cow–calf locomotives were designed both for transferring railroad cars between nearby classification yards in urban areas and for switching within yards. They were built with an emphasis on tractive effort, with top speed of lesser importance.

=== Production and operations ===
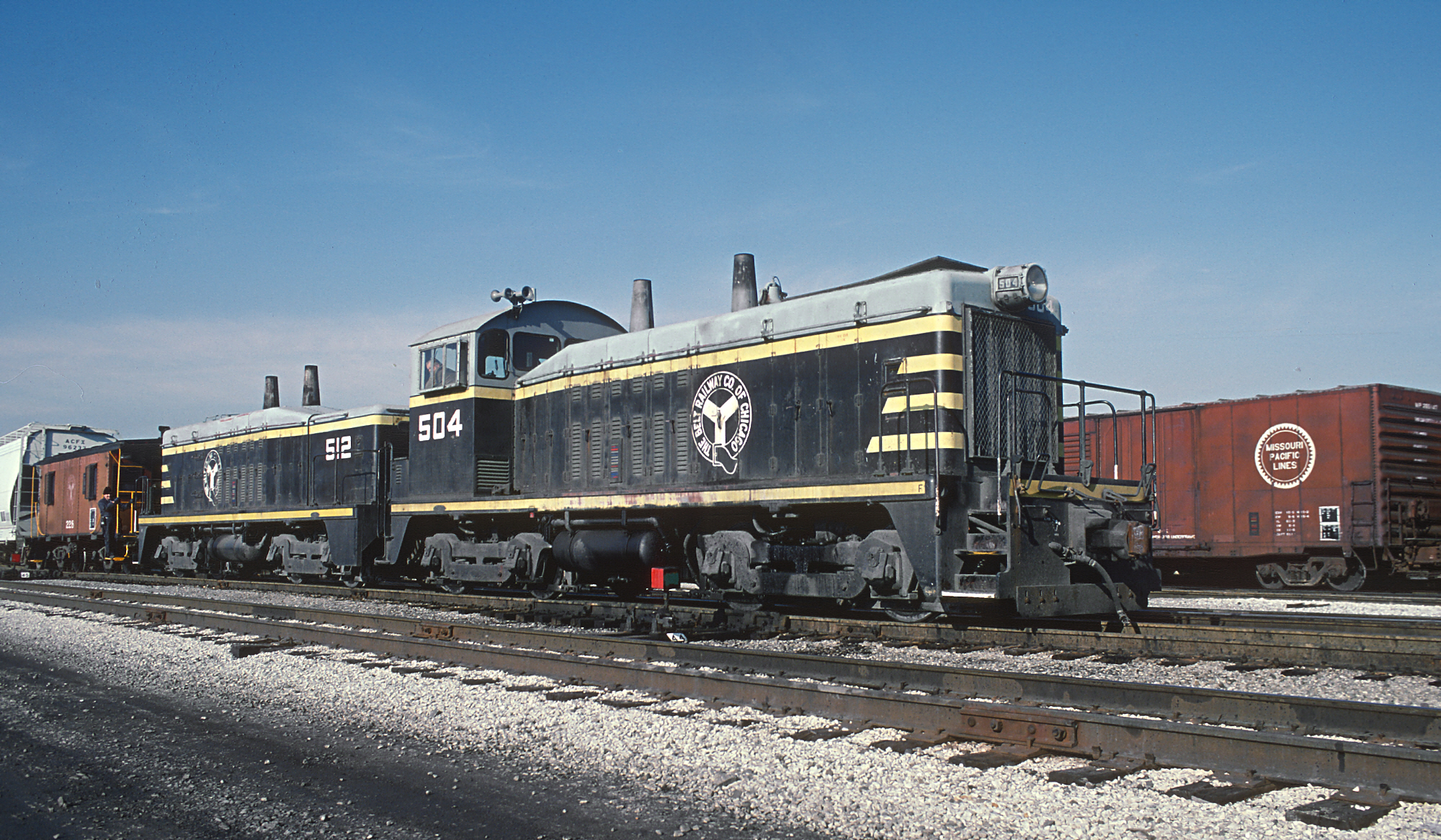
A Belt Railway of Chicago cow–calf set in 1985

Most cow–calf sets were built between the 1930s and the 1950s. They were built by several different makers, although General Motors' Electro-Motive Division built far more than the others, chiefly its TR (transfer) series. In addition to the transfer duties they were designed for, cow–calf sets were also used in hump yards to send cuts of cars over the hump for classification.

The Union Pacific Railroad made use of cow–calf sets as helpers on a steep grade near Kelso, California, until 1959, when the use of multiple-unit train control made them obsolete. Most American examples were replaced by road switcher locomotives. The Belt Railway of Chicago was the final holdout, continuing to operate TR2 and TR4 sets into the 1980s and 1990s.

== List of cow–calf models ==
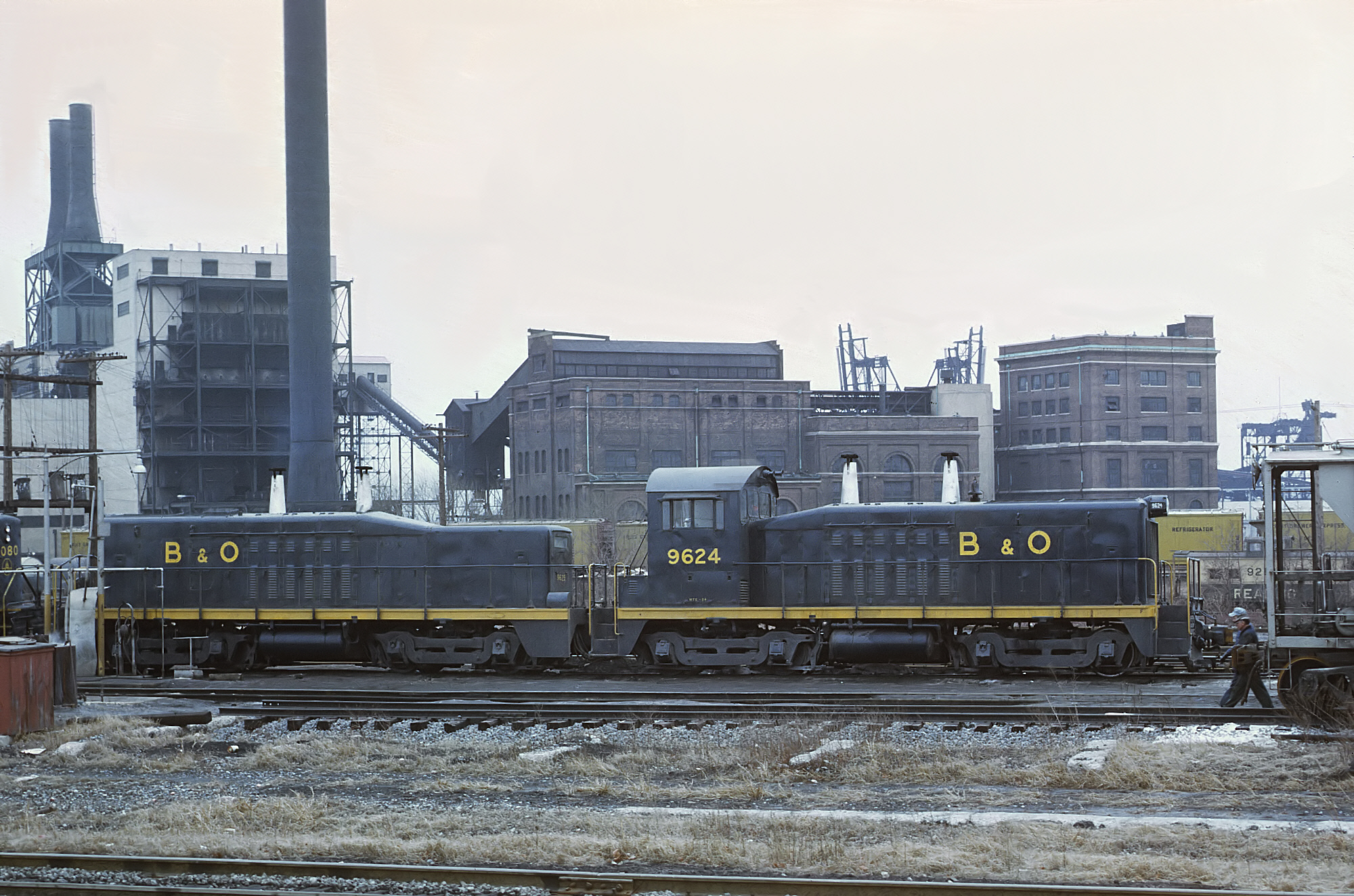
EMD TR4

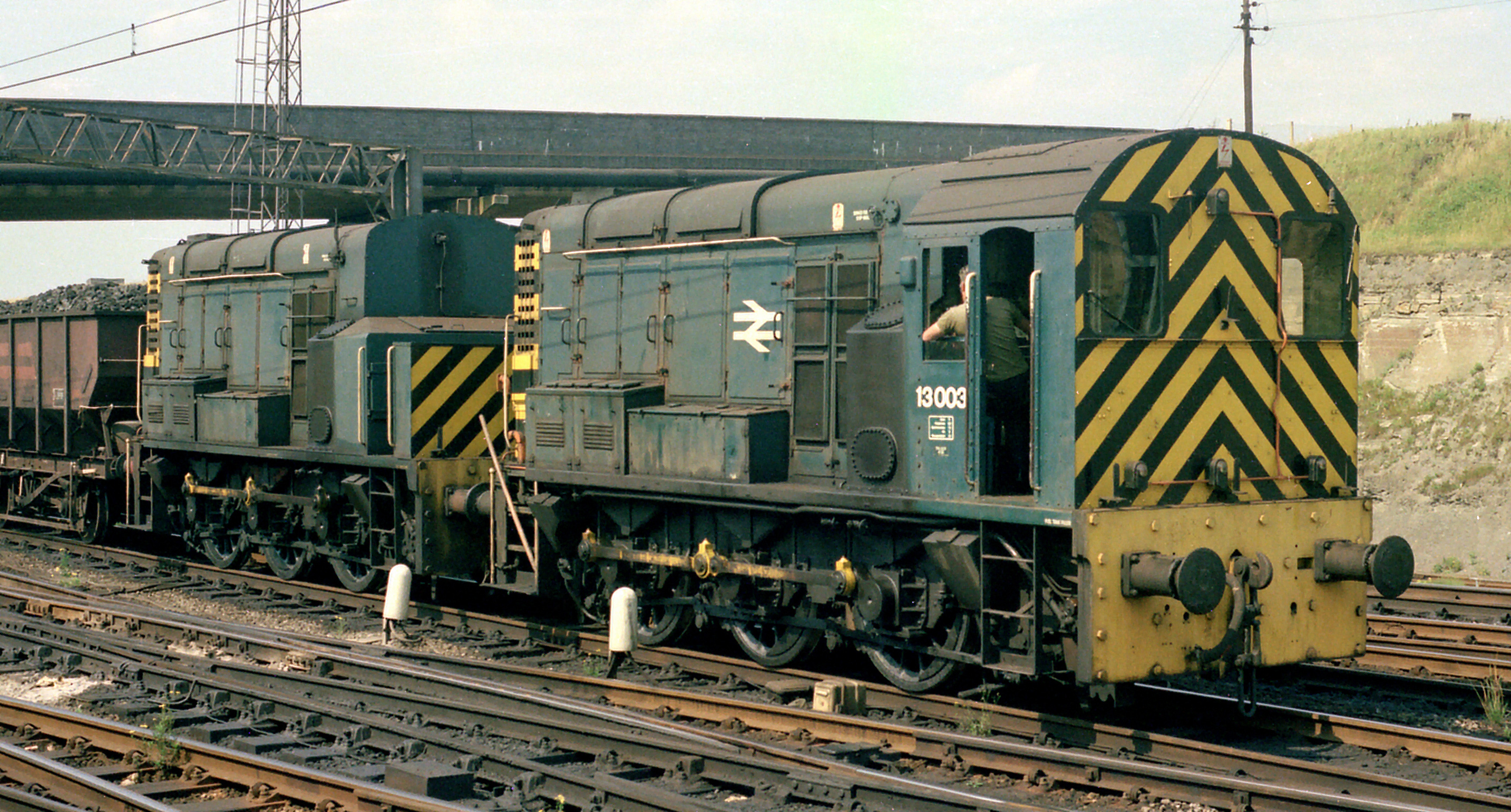
British Rail Class 13

=== TR series ===
EMD's TR (transfer) series were the largest group of cow–calf locomotives built. Produced in seven models, eighty were built between 1940 and 1953, along with two additional calves.

- EMD TR
- EMD TR1
- EMD TR2
- EMD TR3
- EMD TR4
- EMD TR5
- EMD TR6

=== Other cow–calf models ===
The American Locomotive Company (ALCO) built two cow–calf sets, derived from the ALCO S-6 and designated SSB-9.

Baldwin Locomotive Works produced nine cow–calf versions of the Baldwin S-8. Both ALCO and Baldwin's cow–calf sets all went to customer Oliver Mining.

Cow–calf locomotives in the United Kingdom are generally referred to as master and slave locomotives. Three sets were created by British Rail in 1965 by permanently coupling pairs of Class 08 0-6-0DE locomotives dating from 1959 and 1962, the cabs and controls being removed from the calves. They were designated Class 13 and operated at Tinsley Marshalling Yard, the last being withdrawn in 1985. British Steel created some in a similar manner in 1971 for use at Port Talbot Steelworks. Four 0-4-0DE locomotives built by Brush Traction between 1954 and 1957 had their cabs removed and control gear moved into metal cabinets as slaves. Five similar locomotives were equipped to work as masters. The conversions were done in 1971 and they were taken out of service in 1986.

== See also ==
- Slug – Type of rolling stock
- Twin unit – Two railcars operating together as one
