= EMD SW7 =

Model of 1200 hp American diesel switcher

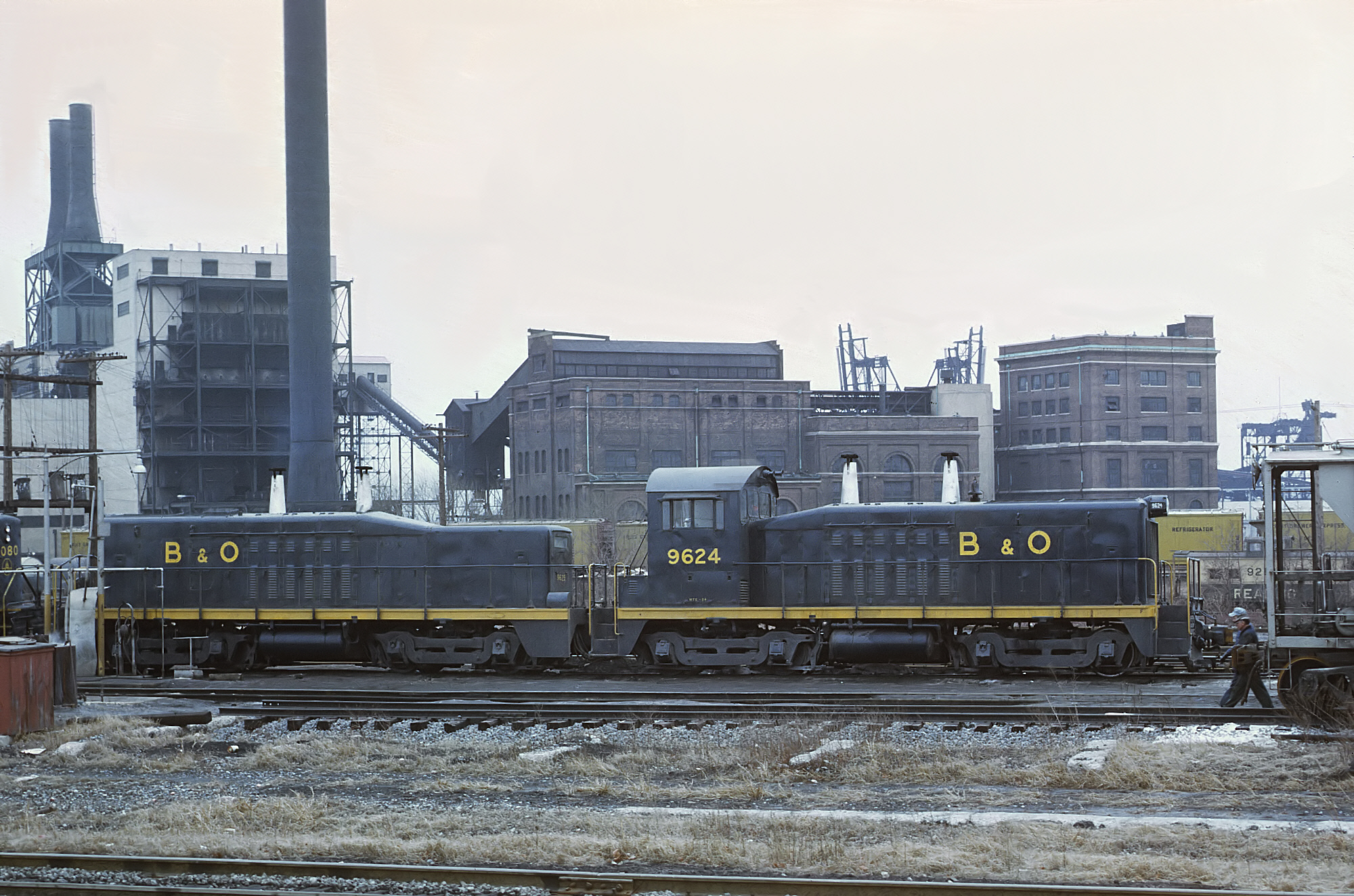
- Baltimore and Ohio No. 9624 TR4 cow–calf set at Riverside Yard, Baltimore, in 1969
Type and origin
- Power type: Diesel–electric
- Builder: General Motors Electro-Motive Division (EMD)
- Model: SW7, TR4
- Build date: October 1949 – January 1951
- Total produced: SW7: 489; TR4: 30
Specifications
- Configuration
  - AAR: B-B
  - UIC: Bo′Bo′
- Gauge: 4 ft 8 1/2 in (1,435 mm) standard gauge
- Prime mover: EMD 12-567BA
- Engine type: V12 diesel
- Aspiration: Roots-type blower
- Cylinders: 12
Performance figures
- Power output: 1,200 hp (895 kW)

The EMD SW7 was a diesel switcher locomotive built by General Motors Electro-Motive Division between October 1949 and January 1951. It was powered by a 1,200 horsepower (895 kW)12-567A engine. The SW7 replaced the earlier 1,000 horsepower NW2 switcher in EMD's catalog. A total of 489 SW7 locomotives were produced. The majority of the SW7s were built by EMD Plant #3 in Cleveland, Ohio. In addition, 30 TR4 cow–calf paired sets were produced.

SW7 production was discontinued in 1951 in favor of the new SW9.

== Original buyers ==
| Railroad | Quantity | Road numbers |
|---|---|---|
| Arkansas and Louisiana Missouri Railway | 1 | 11 |
| Atlantic Coast Line Railroad | 9 | 643–651 |
| Central Railroad of New Jersey | 4 | 1080–1083 |
| Charleston and Western Carolina Railway | 2 | 800–801 |
| Chesapeake and Ohio Railway | 26 | 5214–5239 |
| Chicago and Eastern Illinois Railroad | 6 | 126–131 |
| Chicago and Eastern Illinois (Chicago Heights Terminal and Transfer Railroad) | 2 | 132–133 |
| Chicago and Illinois Western Railroad | 3 | 101–103 |
| Chicago, Burlington and Quincy Railroad | 20 | 9249–9268 |
| Chicago, Milwaukee, St. Paul and Pacific Railroad | 1 | 1646 |
| Clinchfield Railroad | 6 | 350–355 |
| Colorado and Southern Railway | 1 | 154 |
| Conemaugh and Black Lick Railroad | 15 | 103–117 |
| Cornwall Railroad | 3 | 120–122 |
| Detroit and Toledo Shore Line Railroad | 3 | 116–118 |
| Detroit Terminal Railroad | 1 | 116 |
| Detroit, Toledo and Ironton Railroad | 5 | 920–924 |
| Erie Railroad | 6 | 428–433 |
| Great Northern Railway | 11 | 163–170, 11–13 |
| Illinois Central Railroad | 50 | 9300–9319, 9400–9429 |
| Kansas City Southern Railway | 10 | 1300–1309 |
| Kansas City Southern Railway (Louisiana and Arkansas Railway) | 6 | 1310–1315 |
| Lakeside and Marblehead Railroad | 1 | 12 |
| Lehigh Valley Railroad | 5 | 220–224 |
| Louisiana Midland Railway | 1 | 10 |
| Louisville and Nashville Railroad | 22 | 2245–2266 |
| Maine Central Railroad | 3 | 331–333 |
| Missouri Pacific Railroad | 5 | 9142–9146 |
| Monessen Southwestern Railway | 1 | 21 |
| Montour Railroad | 1 | 72 |
| Nashville, Chattanooga and St. Louis Railway | 10 | 24–33 |
| New York Central Railroad | 34 | 8851–8855, 8880–8897, 8911–8921 |
| New York Central (Indiana Harbor Belt Railroad) | 40 | 8835–8850, 8856–8879 |
| New York Central (Chicago River and Indiana Railroad) | 6 | 8898–8903 |
| New York Central (Peoria and Eastern Railway) | 7 | 8904–8910 |
| New York, Chicago and St. Louis Railroad (“Nickel Plate Road”) | 3 | 230–232 |
| Northern Pacific Railway | 8 | 107–114 |
| Pennsylvania Railroad | 48 | 8861–8868, 8871–8872, 9358–9395 |
| Peoria and Pekin Union Railway | 5 | 406–410 |
| Phelps Dodge Corporation (New Cornelia Branch Mine) | 1 | 6 |
| Philadelphia, Bethlehem and New England Railroad | 4 | 31–34 |
| River Terminal Railway | 2 | 61–62 |
| Southern Railway (Alabama Great Southern Railroad) | 5 | 6505–6509 |
| Southern Railway (Cincinnati, New Orleans and Texas Pacific Railway) | 14 | 6060–6073 |
| Southern Railway (Georgia Southern and Florida Railway) | 4 | 8200–8203 |
| Southern Railway (New Orleans and North Eastern Railway) | 12 | 6852–6863 |
| St. Louis Southwestern Railway (“Cotton Belt”) | 4 | 1054–1057 |
| St. Louis-San Francisco Railway (“Frisco”) | 5 | 300–304 |
| Texas and Pacific Railway | 4 | 1020–1023 |
| Union Pacific Railroad | 25 | 1800–1824 |
| Union Railroad | 4 | 571–574 |
| Wabash Railroad | 8 | 355–362 |
| Weyerhaueser Timber Company | 2 | 300–301 |
| Woodward Iron Company | 2 | 50–51 |
| Youngstown and Southern Railway | 2 | 70–71 |
| Total | 489 | |

=== TR4 ===
| Railroad | Quantity A units | Quantity B units | Road numbers A units | Road numbers B units | Notes |
|---|---|---|---|---|---|
| Atchison, Topeka and Santa Fe Railway | 2 | 2 | 2418L–2419L | 2418A–2419A | |
| Belt Railway of Chicago | 5 | 5 | 502A–506A | 502B–506B | |
| Chesapeake and Ohio Railway | 2 | 2 | 6001A–6002A | 6001B–6002B | |
| Chicago, Milwaukee, St. Paul and Pacific Railroad | 6 | 6 | 2001A–2006A | 2001B–2006B | |
| Total | 15 | 15 | | | |

== See also ==
- List of GM-EMD locomotives
