= Baldwin S-8 =

Diesel–electric locomotive

S8
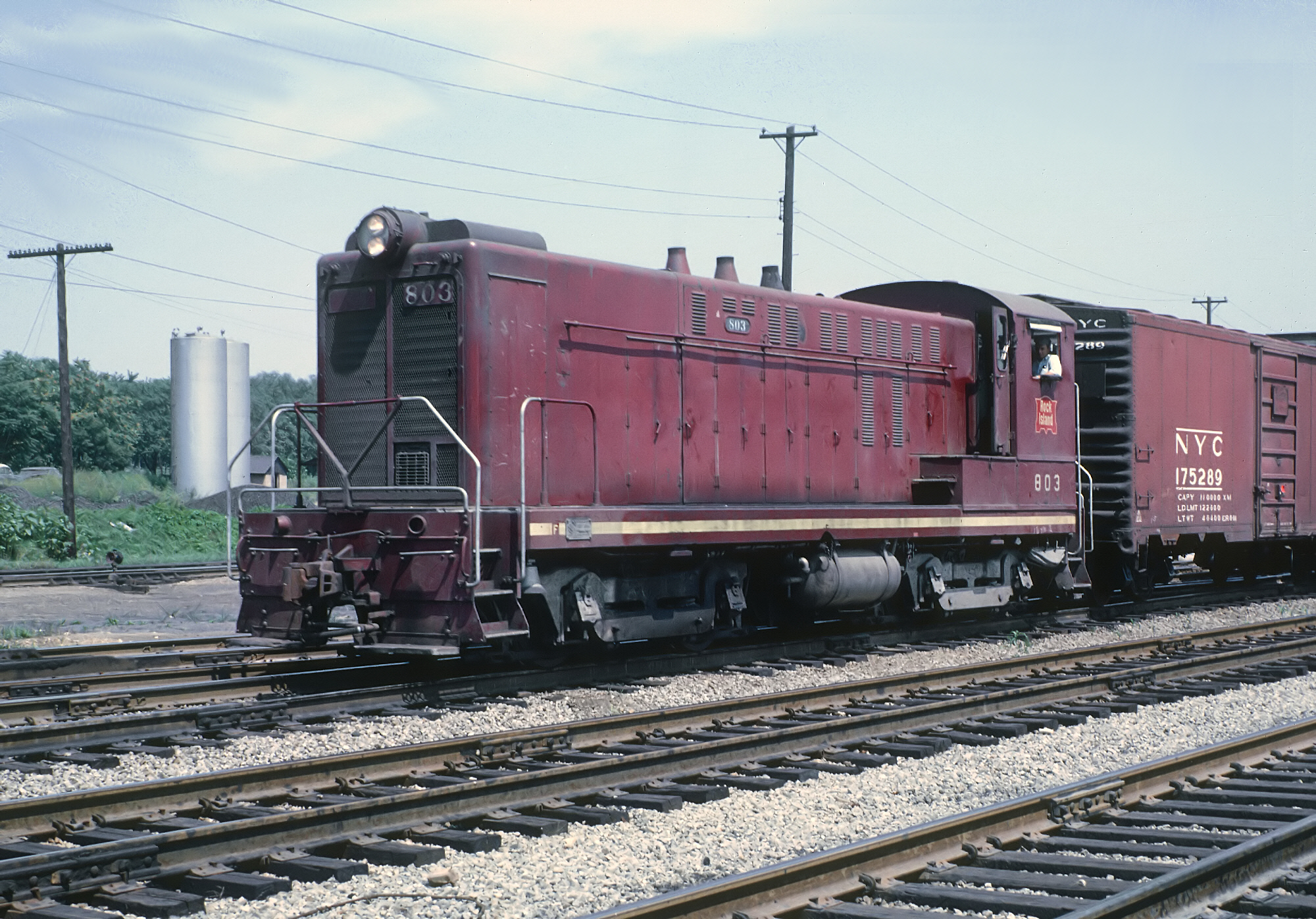
Type and origin
- Power type: Diesel–electric
- Builder: Baldwin-Lima-Hamilton
- Model: S8
- Build date: March 1951 – September 1954
- Total produced: 54, plus 9 calf units
Specifications
- Configuration
  - AAR: B-B
  - UIC: B′B′
- Gauge: 4 ft 8 1/2 in (1,435 mm) standard gauge
- Prime mover: 606
- RPM range: 625 rpm maximum
- Engine type: Straight-6 Four-stroke diesel
- Aspiration: Naturally aspirated, solid injection
- Displacement: 1,979 cu in (32.43 L) per cylinder 11,874 cu in (194.58 L) total
- Generator: Westinghouse 480F
- Traction motors: Westinghouse 362D (4)
- Cylinders: 6
- Cylinder size: 12 3/4 in × 15 1/2 in (324 mm × 394 mm)
- Transmission: Electric
- Gear ratio: 16:76
- Loco brake: Air
- Train brakes: Air
- Couplers: AAR Type E knuckle
Performance figures
- Maximum speed: 45 mph (72 km/h)
- Power output: 875 hp (652 kW) (marketed as 800 hp)
Career
- Locale: United States and Cuba
- Disposition: Two preserved, remainder scrapped

The BLH S8 was an 875-horsepower (652 kW) diesel–electric switcher locomotive. The Baldwin-Lima-Hamilton Corporation produced a total of 63 units (61 for United States railroads and 2 for use in Cuba) between 1951 and 1953. Of these, nine were calf units built for Oliver Iron Mining Company in Minnesota. A tenth calf had been built for them on order, but when delivery was refused, it was fitted with a cab, and converted to a regular S8.

== Original owners ==
Image	Railroad	Quantity	Road numbers	Notes
	American Rolling Mill Company	3	1151, 1152, 1201	
	Escanaba and Lake Superior Railroad	1	102	
	La Salle and Bureau County Railroad	1	8	
	McCloud Railway	1	31	Built with a single stack and space for a turbocharger for later conversion to a S-12, so is factored into the numbers of (and considered to be) an S-12
	Medford Corporation, (Medford, Oregon)	1	8	Only Baldwin switcher built with dynamic brakes
	New Orleans Public Belt Railroad	2	50, 51	
	Oliver Iron Mining Company	9	1200A–1206A, 1214A, 1215A	"Cow" units
	Oliver Iron Mining Company	9	1200B–1206B, 1214B, 1215B	"Calf" units
	Pennsylvania Railroad	6	8994–8999	
	Pennsylvania-Reading Seashore Lines	1	6006	
	Chicago, Rock Island and Pacific Railroad	5	802–806	
	Sharon Steel Corporation	8	3–10	
	Sloss-Sheffield Steel	4	33–36	
	United Railways of Havana, Cuba	2	8001, 8002	
	US Pipe and Foundry	1	37	Build as "calf"; fitted with cab before sale to USP&F
	US Steel	1	13	
	Weyerhaeuser Company	2	103, 105	
	Youngstown Sheet and Tube	7	703, 800–805	
	Totals	54	A units	
	Totals	9	B units	

== Preservation ==
Only two intact examples of the S-8 are known to survive today.

• Medford Corp. #8 is preserved by the Southern Oregon Railway Historical Society in Medford, Oregon.

• US Pipe & Foundry #37 is preserved as Jefferson Warrior #37 at the Heart of Dixie Railroad Museum in Calera, Alabama.
