= British Rail Class 13 =

Class of British diesel shunting locomotive

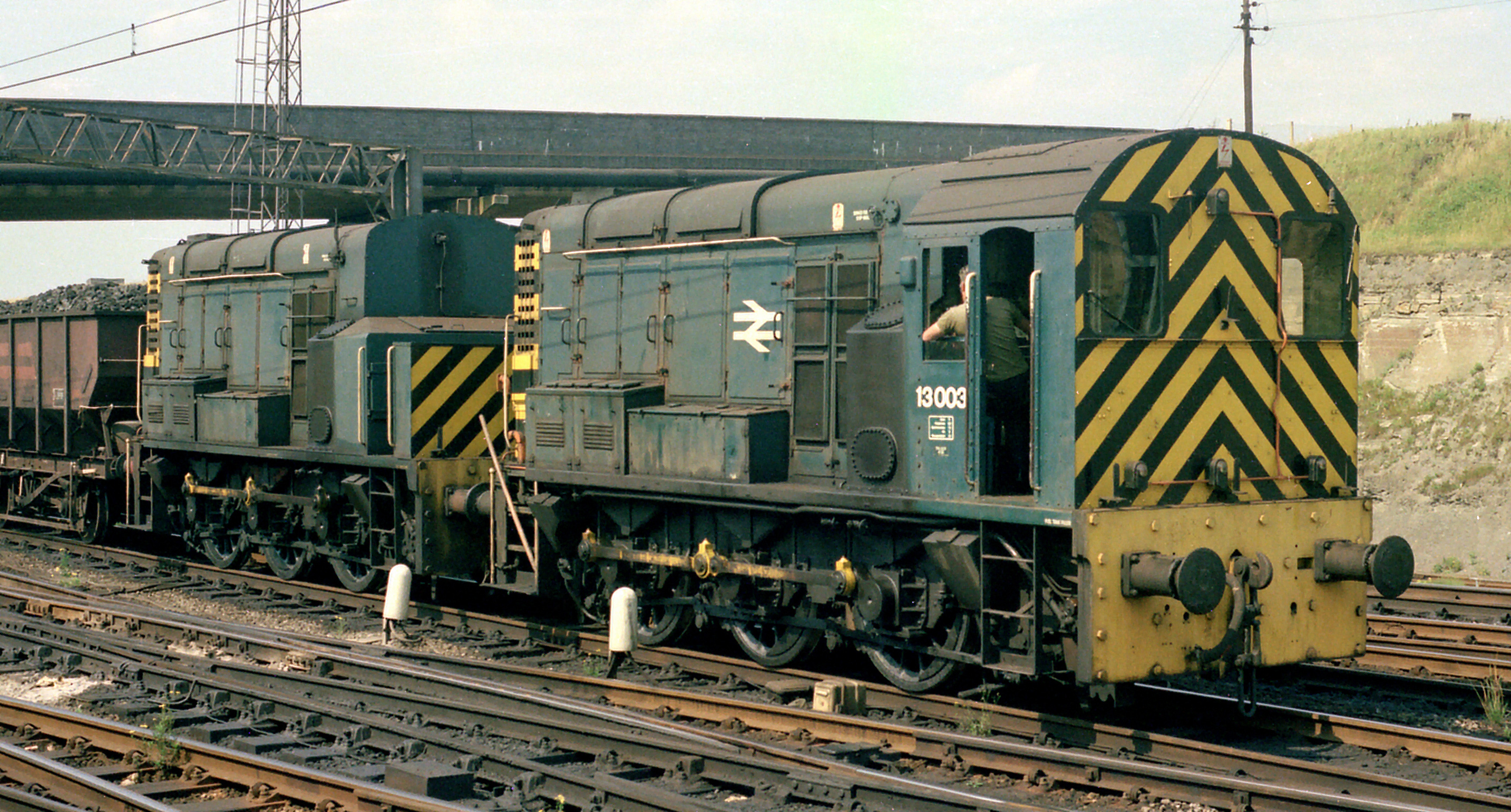
- A British Rail Class 13 at Tinsley Marshalling Yard, 1974
Type and origin
- Power type: Diesel–electric
- Builder: British Railways Darlington Works (builder and rebuilder)
- Build date: 1965 (rebuilt)
- Total produced: 3
Specifications
- Configuration
  - Whyte: 0-6-0+0-6-0
  - AAR: C-C
  - UIC: C+C
- Gauge: 4 ft 8 1/2 in (1,435 mm) standard gauge
- Wheel diameter: 4 ft 6 in (1.372 m)
- Minimum curve: 3 ch (60 m)
- Wheelbase: 42 ft 1 1/2 in (12.84 m)
- Length: 60 ft 1 in (18.31 m)
- Width: 8 ft 10 in (2.69 m)
- Height: 12 ft 8 5/8 in (3.88 m)
- Loco weight: 120 long tons (122 t; 134 short tons)
- Fuel capacity: 1,336 imp gal (6,070 L; 1,604 US gal)
- Prime mover: English Electric 6KT, 2 off
- Generator: DC
- Traction motors: EE, four off
- Transmission: Diesel electric, double reduction gearing
- MU working: Not fitted (except control of slave by master)
- Train heating: None
- Train brakes: Vacuum
Performance figures
- Maximum speed: 15 or 20 mph (24 or 32 km/h)
- Power output: Engine: 400 hp (298 kW) × 2
- Tractive effort: Maximum: 70,000 lbf (311.4 kN)
- Brakeforce: 37 long tons-force (370 kN)
Career
- Operators: British Railways
- Numbers: D4500–D4502, later 13 001–13 003
- Axle load class: RA 8
- Retired: 1981–1985
- Scrapped: 1982 (13 002); 1985-6 (13 001 and 13 003)
- Disposition: All scrapped

The British Rail Class 13 was a class of diesel–electric shunting locomotive designed in 1965 to provide more powerful shunters for the Tinsley Marshalling Yard. Due to Tinsley's status as a hump yard, it was not possible to use a single locomotive owing to the risk of grounding. To achieve the required power, a pair of Class 08 shunters were permanently coupled in master and slave formation, with the slave unit having its cab removed and both units ballasted to improve traction. Initially coupled cab-to-cab, it was found more practical to couple master nose to slave cab.

== Units ==
Three pairs were formed as follows:

Image	Unit number		Master unit	Slave unit	Withdrawn	Fate	Notes
Image	Original	TOPS	Master unit	Slave unit	Withdrawn	Fate	Notes
	D4501	13001	D4190	D4189	January 1985	Scrapped at BREL Swindon, May 1985	
	D4502	13002	D4187	D3697	June 1981	Scrapped at BREL Swindon, October 1982	
	D4500	13003	D4188	D3698	January 1985	Scrapped at BREL Doncaster, September 1986	

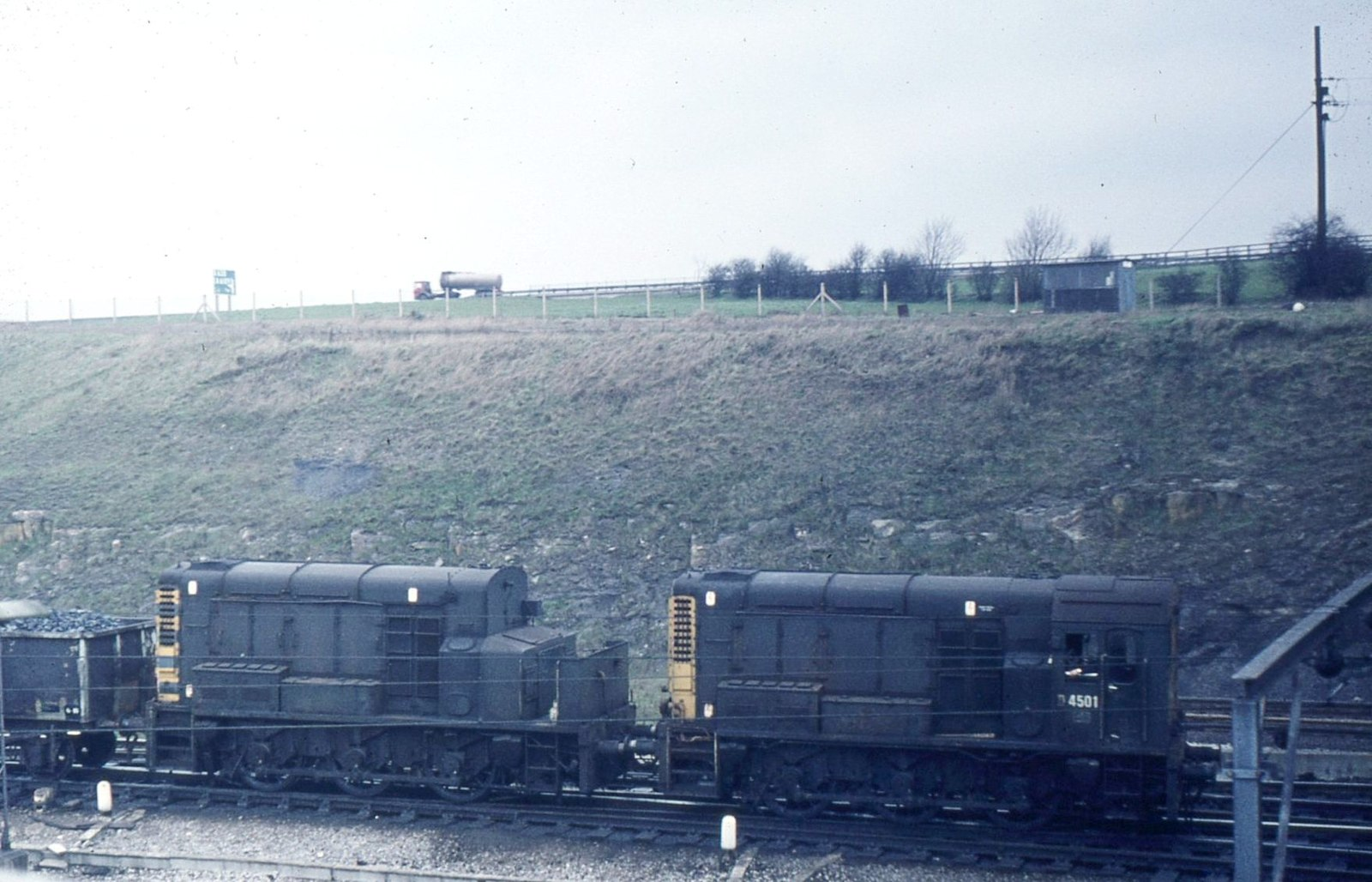
D4501 (later 13 001) at Tinsley

== Withdrawal ==
With the end of hump shunting at Tinsley the class became obsolete. The class's unique features were not required elsewhere and as such were withdrawn; 13 002 was withdrawn in 1981, with the remaining two locomotives scrapped with the closure of Tinsley hump in 1985.

== Model railways ==
Bachmann currently offer a Class 13 in OO gauge.
