= EMD TR1 =

Two-unit cow-calf diesel locomotive

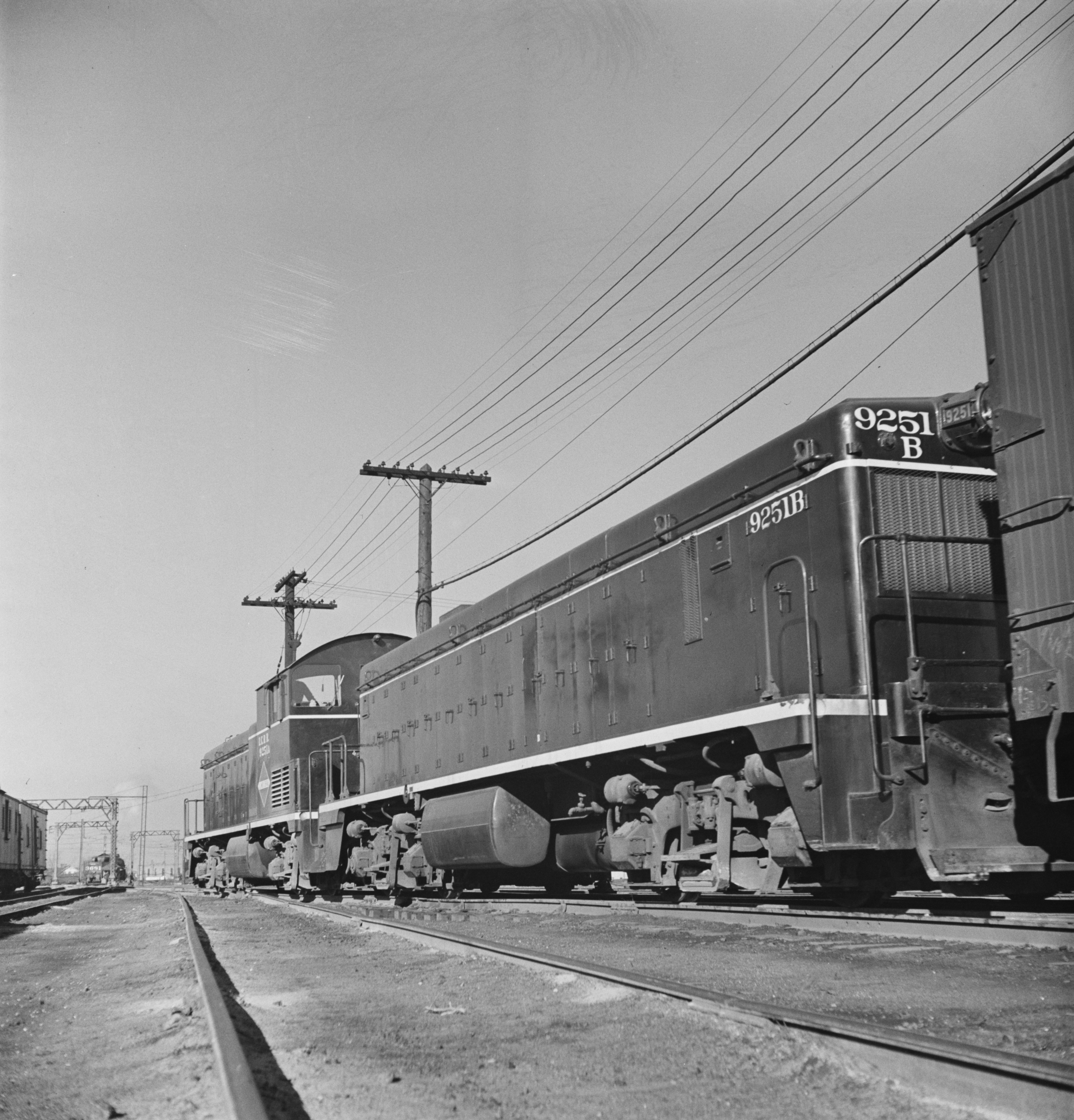
- TR1 #9251 in 1942
Type and origin
- Power type: Diesel–electric
- Builder: General Motors; Electro-Motive Division
- Model: TR1
- Build date: 1941
- Total produced: 2 pair
Specifications
- Configuration
  - AAR: B-B+B-B
  - UIC: Bo'Bo'+Bo'Bo'
- Gauge: 4 ft 8 1/2 in (1,435 mm) standard gauge
- Trucks: Blomberg B
- Prime mover: EMD 16-567 (2)
- Engine type: V16 2-stroke diesel
- Cylinders: 16 (2)
- Loco brake: Straight air
- Train brakes: Air
Performance figures
- Power output: 2,700 hp (2,000 kW)
Career
- Operators: Illinois Central Railroad
- Retired: 1966
- Disposition: Traded for parts

The EMD TR1 was a two-unit cow–calf diesel locomotive built by General Motors Electro-Motive Division of La Grange, Illinois, in 1941. Two pairs were built for the Illinois Central Railroad, the only purchaser.

The locomotive units strongly resembled the EMD NW3, with a long frame, Blomberg B road trucks, and a large cab connected to a wide area of hood that tapered going forward. The locomotives incorporated the machinery of the EMD FT in switcher locomotive bodywork; a V16 EMD 567 diesel engine of 1,350 horsepower (1,010 kW) in each unit.

The cow and calf units were semipermanently coupled together with a drawbar instead of couplers, in similar fashion to the FT's twin-unit sets.

The two locomotive pairs were numbered 9250A&B and 9251A&B, later renumbered 1350A&B and 1351A&B. They initially were assigned to Markham Yard south of Chicago, IL, but by the early 1950s had been reassigned to the yard at East St. Louis, IL.

Both remained in this service until they were retired in 1966 and traded in to EMD in part exchange for new EMD GP40 locomotives.

== See also ==
List of GM-EMD locomotives
