= Detroit Terminal Railroad =

- Map

Overview
- Locale: Detroit
- Dates of operation: 1905–1981
- Successor: Conrail

Technical
- Track gauge: 4 ft 8 1/2 in (1,435 mm) standard gauge

Detroit Terminal Railroad Company was incorporated in the State of Michigan, United States of America, on December 7, 1905, to own railroad track forming a semi-circle around the City of Detroit. It existed as a railroad until it was merged into its parent company, Consolidated Rail Corp., on May 31, 1984.

== History ==
=== Creation and development ===
By 1905 many of the prime industrial locations in the City of Detroit located on railroad lines were already taken, causing an impediment to the development of the automotive and other industries being created at that time. Detroit Terminal Railroad's trackage extended around the City of Detroit in what is called a "belt line," reaching rural undeveloped locations in order to open up opportunities for new industrial development in the rapidly growing city. Originally planned but never accomplished was a railroad-operated "car ferry" operation to sail the Detroit River to distribute freight at the many docks located along the river that were inaccessible to railway shipping.

Originally capitalized by local Detroit business owners desiring railway access to their businesses, the first section of the Detroit Terminal Railroad was completed from a location on the Detroit River east of downtown Detroit north approximately four miles to a connection with the Michigan Central Railroad and Grand Trunk Western Railroad known as Milwaukee Junction. Soon afterwards Detroit Terminal Railroad was purchased jointly by Michigan Central Railroad (25%), Grand Trunk Western Railroad (50%) and Lake Shore & Michigan Southern Railway (25%), all having railroad lines in Detroit. Detroit Terminal Railroad's route was extended in sections by its new owners according to its original plans as a belt line until it owned and operated 18 miles of main line trackage from the Detroit River on the east side of town to the Michigan Central mainline located on the west side of town by 1914. Total investment at this point was US$1.5 million. Detroit Terminal was operated as an independent organization from its owning railroads including having its own business offices and employees.

Soon after completion in 1914, Detroit Terminal Railroad was exceeding its capacity in freight business and began to double track its entire route and adding signalling for control of train movements. In 1914 about 75,000 loaded freight cars were delivered to or originating from about 50 important industries served by the railroad. These industries included many of the automotive manufacturers of the time including the Chalmers Motor Company, the Hudson Motor Company, Continental Motor Company and Ford Motor Company. Ford's Highland Park Plant at this time was the largest shipper on the railroad shipping 176 outbound freight cars daily containing automobiles and up to 100 freight cars daily bringing in supplies and materials to build the cars. When Ford completed its huge River Rouge Complex in Dearborn, Michigan Detroit Terminal Railroad's western extension was completed to service it providing Ford with the benefits of having a terminal railroad to connect with all the other railroads in Detroit for routing its freight.

The interest of Michigan Central, Grand Trunk Western and Lake Shore & Michigan Southern railroads in owning the Detroit Terminal Railroad was not only for accessing newly developed industrial sites located outside of downtown Detroit for industrial development serviced by rail but to also allow the better interchanging of freight cars between the three owner railroads and with all the other railroads in Detroit. As Detroit Terminal Railroad had physical connections with the other major Detroit railroads, Pere Marquette Railroad, the Wabash Railroad and the Detroit, Toledo & Ironton, this provided its owner railroads with these interchange connections. By handling the transfer of interchange business over the Detroit Terminal Railroad the freight classification yards on the other railroads in Detroit were relieved and the handling of local business was also facilitated by using Detroit Terminal Railroad to distribute freight to the industries located on its line.

=== Growth and decline ===
Freight movement on the Detroit Terminal Railroad saw steady growth up to 1950, largely driven by the expanding automotive industry in Detroit. Throughout the 1950s, business remained stable, but a decline began in the 1960s. By 1968, there was significant concern at the railroad's offices as carloadings had plummeted from a peak of 151,914 in 1953 to 57,543 in 1967. This decline was attributed to several factors, including shifts in urban heating preferences from coal to natural gas, the closure of major automotive plants like DeSoto and Hudson in Detroit, and the adoption of larger, high-capacity freight cars ("hi-cube" and "autorack") by automotive companies, which replaced multiple smaller freight cars previously used.During this period, revenue per freight car moved nearly doubled between 1953 and 1967, but operating expenses per freight car moved tripled. Employment also decreased from 358 in 1953 to 227 in 1967, with salaries consuming 98% of operating revenue by 1967. In 1967 there was an estimated $2.5 million in deferred maintenance to tracks and equipment. Blame was placed on poor management of the railroad by its two railroad owners (Michigan Central and Lake Shore & Michigan Southern had merged into the New York Central by this time) who were not paying enough attention to the railroad. Also "deteriorating social conditions" culminating in the 1967 race riots in Detroit at the time were causing an exodus of industries located on the railroad further reducing carloadings.

== Operations ==
The main freight yard of the Detroit Terminal was its Davison Yard located in northern Detroit at Davison and Mound Roads located about in the middle of the belt line's route. All freight cars came and went through Davison Yard where they were classified for the various trains to take the freight cars to the on-line industries or the connecting railroads for interchange. Additional lesser freight yards on Detroit Terminal Railroad included East Warren Yard, Mack Yard and Van Dyke Yard, all located east of Davison Yard, and West Warren Yard and Lonyo Yard all located west of Davison Yard. Interchanges were with New York Central Railroad (later Penn Central then Conrail) at their Livernois Yard until 1974 then afterwards at North Yard, Grand Trunk Western at their East Yard, Pere Marquette (later Chesapeake & Ohio then CSX) at their Rougemere Yard, Detroit Toledo & Ironton (before owned by Grand Trunk Western) at their Ford Yard, Pennsylvania Railroad (before merger with New York Central) and Wabash (later N&W) at "Oakman Spur" at Lonyo Avenue by West Warren Yard.

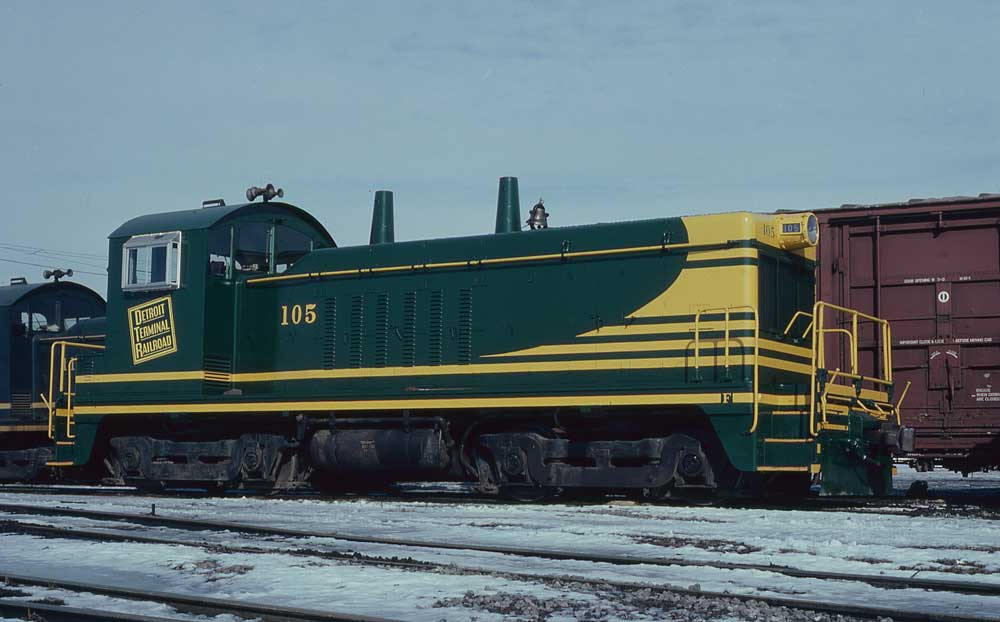
Detroit Terminal Railroad EMD NW2 #105 was just recently rebuilt and repainted in this February 15, 1981 photograph taken at the railroad's Davison Freight Yard in Detroit, Michigan USA

== Locomotives ==
Locomotives used by the Detroit Terminal Railroad in the era of steam locomotives were 0-6-0 and 0-8-0 type switch locomotives. Starting in 1945 Detroit Terminal Railroad began replacing its steam locomotives with diesel-electric locomotives. It purchased its first two diesel locomotives from Baldwin Locomotive Company in 1945, numbers 101 and 102, both models VO-1000, followed by #103, a DS44-1000 in 1947. It completed dieselization in 1947 with the purchase of nine model NW2 diesel switchers from Electro-Motive Division of General Motors, numbers 104 through 112. It purchased two more NW2 model switchers in 1949 (numbers 114 and 115) and purchased its final locomotive in 1951 with an EMD SW7 model switcher, number 116.

== The end of Detroit Terminal Railroad ==
By the late 1970s on-line business had rapidly declined on the Detroit Terminal Railroad. With railroad consolidation occurring in Detroit as well as nationwide the use of the Detroit Terminal Railroad for the interchange purposes of its two owners had also declined and in 1980 Grand Trunk Western sold its 50% interest in Detroit Terminal Railroad to its other owner, Consolidated Rail Corporation (Conrail). Conrail operated it for a year then, in August 1981, combined Detroit Terminal Railroad operations with its own railroad operations out of its North Yard in Detroit. Over the next couple years Conrail cut back on operating the former Detroit Terminal Railroad trackage and eventually stopped operating over the middle portion between West Warren ave and Gallagher St. This section was subsequently sold to the City of Detroit and is being converted into the Joe Louis Greenway. Conrail (Shared Assets) operations still run daily trains over what was the east end of the Detroit Terminal Railroad to service a Jeep manufacturing plant owned by Chrysler Group LLC. Conrail also runs as-needed on the other portions from North Yard- west, and in Dearborn.

On May 31, 1984, Conrail legally merged Detroit Terminal Railroad into itself, officially ending 79 years of continuous operation by Detroit's only terminal railroad.
