= EMD NW2 =

Switcher locomotive

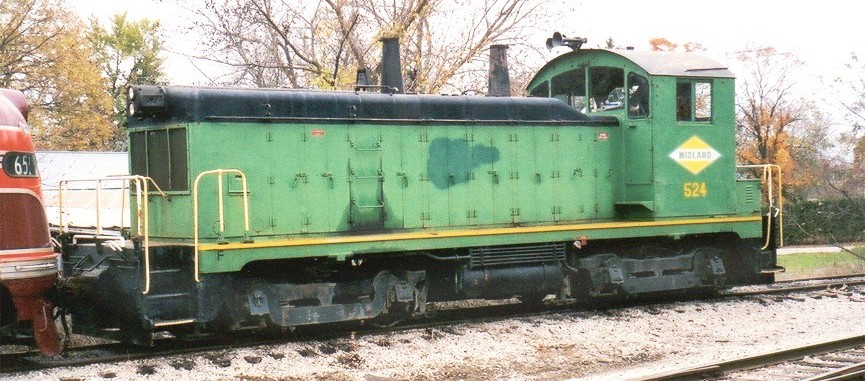
- Midland Railway EMD NW2 #524, at Baldwin City, Kansas
Type and origin
- Power type: Diesel–electric
- Builder: General Motors; Electro-Motive Division (EMD)
- Model: NW2, TR
- Build date: February 1939 – December 1949
- Total produced: NW2: 1,145; TR: 84
Specifications
- Configuration
  - AAR: B-B
- Gauge: 4 ft 8 1/2 in (1,435 mm)
- Length: 44 ft (13 m)
- Prime mover: EMD 12-567 or 12-567A
- Engine type: V12
- Generator: D4, D15 used in late 1949 production
- Traction motors: 4 D7
- Cylinders: 12
Performance figures
- Power output: 1,000 hp (750 kW)

The EMD NW2 is a 1,000 hp (750 kW), B-B switcher locomotive manufactured by General Motors Electro-Motive Division of La Grange, Illinois. From February 1939 to December 1949, EMD produced 1,145 NW2s: 1,121 for U.S. and 24 for Canadian railroads. Starting in late 1948, the NW2s were manufactured in EMD's Plant #3 in Cleveland, Ohio. The locomotives were powered by a 12-cylinder model 567 engine and later a model 567A engine. In addition, EMD built three TR cow–calf paired sets, 72 TR2 cow–calf paired sets, and two TR3 cow–calf–calf sets. The TR sets were built before World War II; the TR2 and TR3 sets afterward.

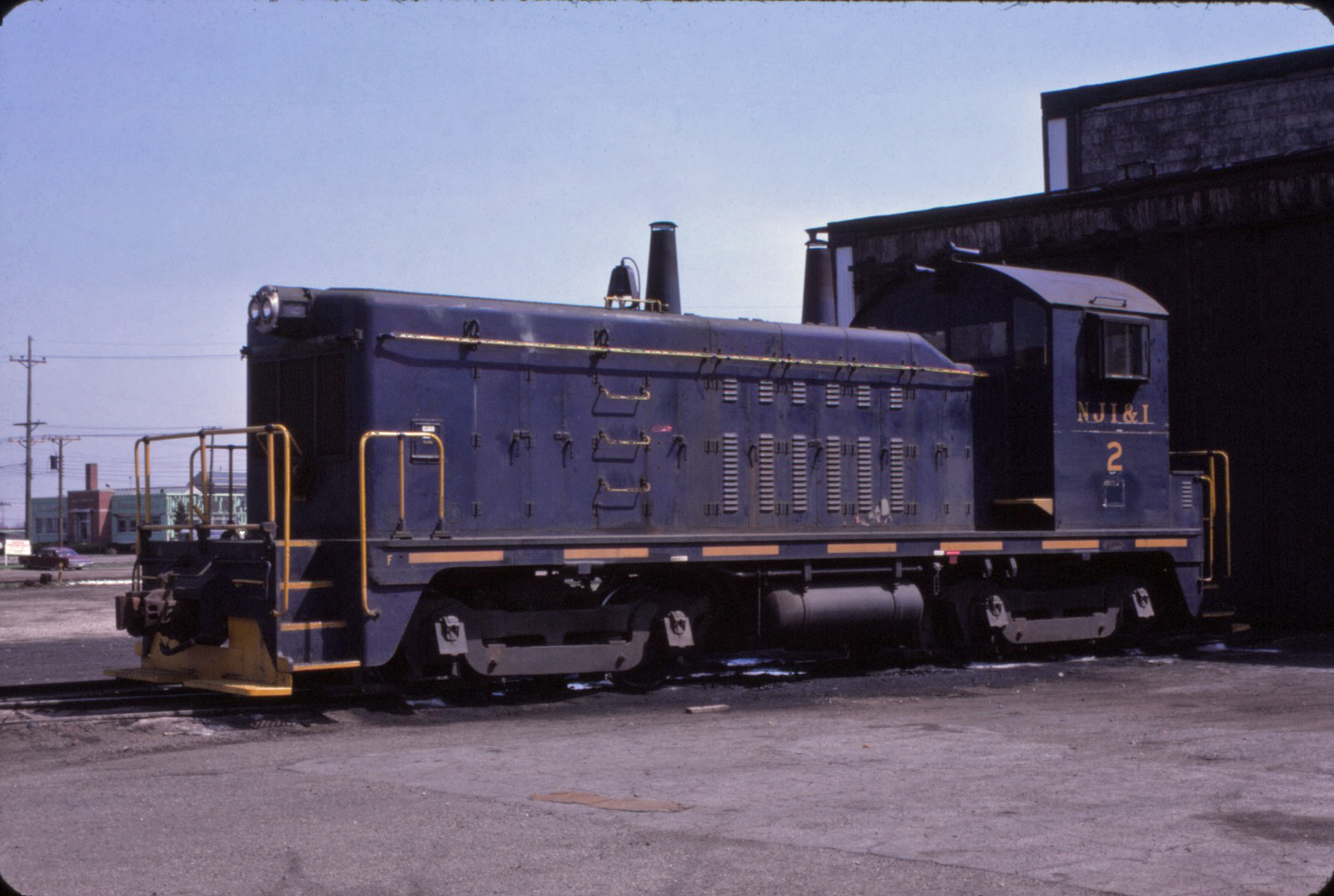
New Jersey Indiana and Illinois Railroad NW2 #2 (Formerly Indiana Northern #100) at South Bend IN

== Identification ==
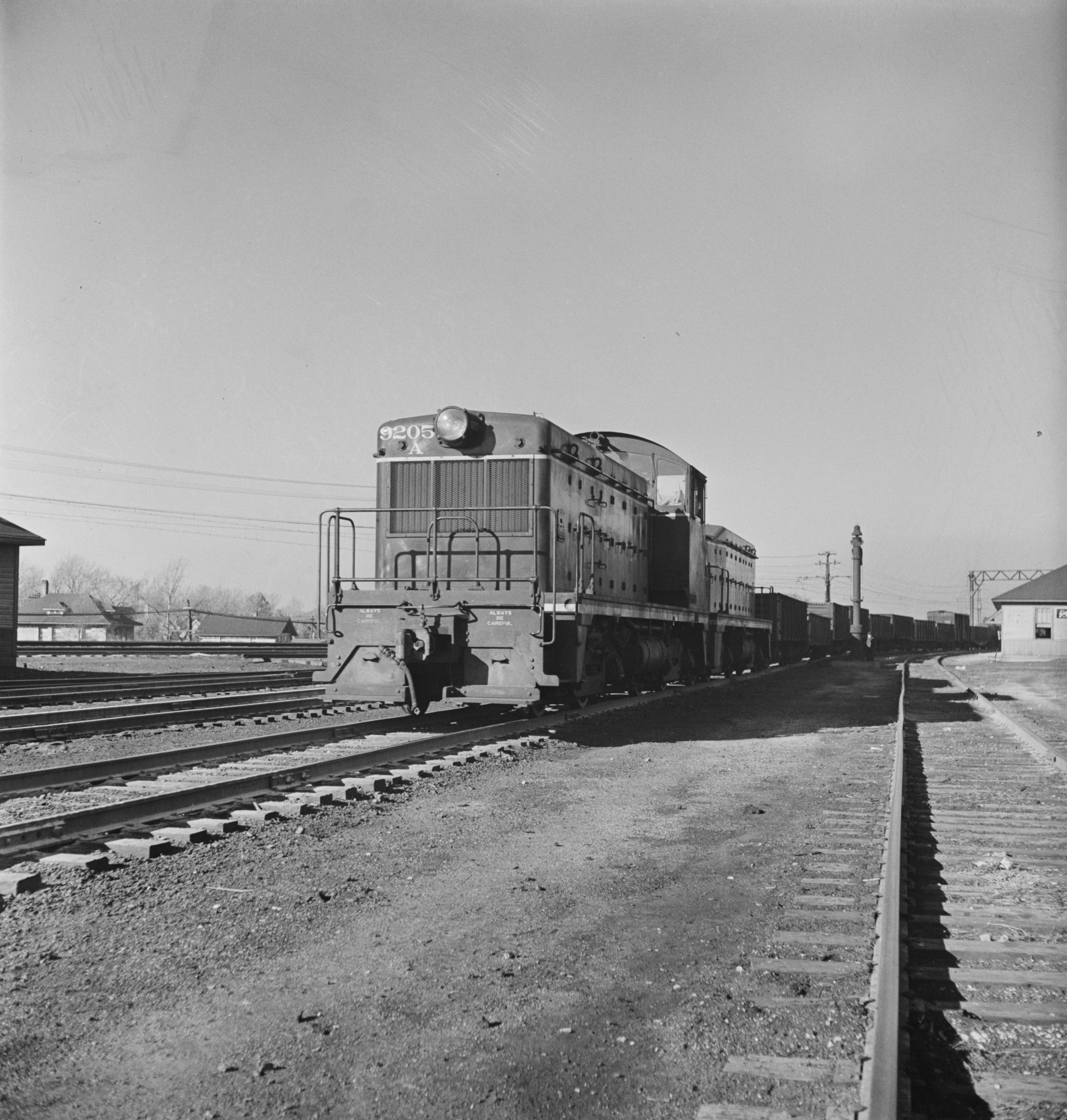
EMD TR #9205

Distinguishing features include two stacks in the middle of the hood, a half-height radiator grille, no sand box on the front platform, and no small louvers at the top front corners of the sides of the hood. The predecessor of the NW2 was the NC, NC1, NC2, NW, NW1, NW1A, NW4. The "N" stands for the nine in nine hundred hp (670 kW). The "W" in all models stands for a welded frame, with the "C" meaning a cast frame.

== Original owners ==
=== NW2 ===
Railroad	Quantity	Road numbers	Notes
Appalachicola Northern Railroad	4	701–704	Sold 11-70 to Clinchfield Railroad #357-360, retired by Clinchfield 1980, 357-358 traded to GE, 359-360 sold to Clinchfield Coal Company
Arkansas and Louisiana Missouri Railway	1	10	
Atchison, Topeka and Santa Fe Railway	15	2353–2367	Renumbered 2403–2417
Atlantic Coast Line Railroad	6	601, 603, 605, 611, 613, 615	600,611,613,615 Renumbered 600-602,604, 600-605 to Seaboard Coast Line Railroad 20-25
Baltimore and Ohio Railroad	49	400–408, 550–589	Renumbered 9500–9508, 9542-9551, 9512–9541
Baltimore and Ohio Chicago Terminal Railroad	3	409–411	Renumbered 9509–9511
Bangor and Aroostook Railroad	4	800–803	Renumbered 20–23
Boston and Maine Railroad	14	1200–1213	
Canadian National Railways	20	7936–7945, 7956–7965	
Central of Georgia Railway	2	20, 25	renumbered 1016-1017
Central Railroad of New Jersey	2	1060–1061	
Chesapeake and Ohio Railway	41	1850–1856, 5200–5213, 5060–5079	1850-1856 renumbered 9558-9564
Chicago and Eastern Illinois Railroad	6	119–124	119 renumbered 125, 120-125 renumbered 1029-1034, then 1029, 1033, 1034 to Louisville & Nashville 2207-2209
Chicago and Western Indiana Railroad	2	250–251	250 to Acme-Newport Steel 2, 251 to Roscoe, Snyder & Pacific 300
Chicago Great Western Railway	17	16–31, 42	to Chicago and North Western Railway 16-31, 42, 16-30, 42 renumbered 1017-1020, 1022–1032, 1016, 1033, 31 to East Camden & Highland 61
Chicago, Burlington and Quincy Railroad	46	9203–9248	to Burlington Northern 500-545
Chicago, Indianapolis and Louisville Railway (“Monon”)	7	DS-1, DS-2, DS-3, 14–17	DS-1, DS-2, DS-3 renumbered 11–13
Chicago, Milwaukee, St. Paul and Pacific Railroad (“Milwaukee Road”)	8	1647–1654	Renumbered 665–672
Chicago, Rock Island and Pacific Railroad	10	765–774	
Chicago, St. Paul, Minneapolis and Omaha Railway	1	70	to Chicago and North Western Railway 70
Colorado and Southern Railway	4	150–153	to Burlington Northern. Same
Conemaugh and Black Lick Railroad	3	100–102	
Delaware, Lackawanna and Western Railroad	5	461–465	to Erie Lackawanna Railroad 441-445
Denver and Rio Grande Western Railroad	1	7000	Renumbered 100
Detroit Terminal Railroad	11	104–112, 114–115	
Detroit, Toledo and Ironton Railroad	7	910–916	
Elgin, Joliet and Eastern Railway	40	403–407, 409–443	
Electro-Motive Division (demonstrator)	1	889	to Union Pacific 1000
Erie Railroad	27	401–427	to Erie Lackawanna 401-427
Fort Worth and Denver City Railway	3	603, 605–606	to Burlington Northern. Same
Fort Worth Belt Railway	1	2	to Missouri Pacific Railroad 1020
Georgia Railroad	5	901–905	
Grand Trunk Western Railroad	24	7900–7914, 7966–7974	7974 built as Central Vermont Railway 7974
Great Northern Railway	51	5302–5331, 5334-5336, 145–162	5302–5336 renumbered 102–135, to Burlington Northern 450-499
Illinois Central Railroad	17	9150–9166	Renumbered 1000–1016
Indiana Harbor Belt Railroad	78	8715–8739, 8774–8802, 8811–8834	8715 to Peoria & Eastern 8907 (2nd), 8797 to New York Central 8926 (2nd) then Penn Central 8926, 8794, 8795, 8792-8802 to New York Central same numbers, then to Penn Central same numbers
Indiana Northern Railway	1	100	to NJI&I 2, then Wabash 353, then N&W 3353
Jacksonville Terminal	7	30–36	
Kansas City Southern Railway	32	1100–1102, 1125–1126, 1200–1226	1125–1126, 1212-1221 were Louisiana & Arkansas
Kansas, Oklahoma and Gulf Railway	1	1001	to Texas & Pacific Railroad 1027
Lake Champlain and Moriah Rail Road	1	19	
Lake Superior Terminal and Transfer Railway	5	100–104	
Lake Terminal Railroad	20	1001–1020	
Lehigh Valley Railroad	7	180–186	
Louisville and Nashville Railroad	5	2240–2244	Renumbered 2215–2219
Manistee and Northeastern Railway	2	2–3	to Chesapeake and Ohio Railway 5297-5298
Maryland and Pennsylvania Railroad	2	80–81	80 to Republic Steel 334, 1958, rebuilt to remote-control "drone" after 1989. 81 to PH Glatfelter 1986, RR Museum PA, 1997.
Minneapolis and St. Louis Railway	2	D-139, D-740	Renumbered 100, 101 to Chicago & North Western Ry 100, 201, renumbered 1036, 1021
Minneapolis, St. Paul and Sault Ste. Marie Railroad (“Soo Line”)	2	300, 301	
Minneapolis, St. Paul and Sault Ste. Marie Railroad (Wisconsin Central Railway)	1	2108	
Missouri Pacific Railroad	3	9104–9106	9104, 9106 renumbered 1021, 1022
Missouri–Illinois Railroad	1	51	to Missouri Pacific Railroad 1028
Missouri–Kansas–Texas Railroad	5	1026–1030	Renumbered 7–11. No. 1029 is preserved at the Wichita Falls Railroad Museum.
Nashville, Chattanooga and St. Louis Railway	5	20–23, 25	25 renumbered 19; to Louisville and Nashville Railroad 2119-2123, renumbered 2210-2214
New York Central Railroad	57	8700–8714, 8740–8773, 8803–8810	8705-8714, 8740-8749 were Pittsburgh & Lake Erie, 8700-8704, 8750-8773, 8803-8810 to Penn Central same numbers
New York, Chicago and St. Louis Railroad (“Nickel Plate Road”)	16	7–22	
New York, Ontario and Western Railway	21	111–131	115 to Northern Pacific Railway 99, 111-113 to Unadilla Valley Railway 111-113, then to Chicago, Rock Island and Pacific 795-797, remainder to New York Central Railroad 9500-9516, renumbered 8683-8699, to Penn Central 8683-8699
Northern Pacific Railway	6	101–106	99, 102-106 to Burlington Northern 586-592
Pennsylvania Railroad	32	3909, 5921–5925, 9155–9176, 9247–9250	3909 renumbered 5912, then 5912 renumbered 8677, 5921-5925 renumbered 8651-8654, 8678, 9155-9176 renumbered 8655-8676, 9247-9250 renumbered 8647-8650, to Penn Central as 8647-8678
Peoria and Pekin Union Railway	6	400–405	
Pere Marquette Railway	14	51–64	to Chesapeake and Ohio Railway 5275-5278, 5280-5282, 9565, 5284-5289
Phelps Dodge Corporation, Lavender Pit	2	1–2	to Morenci Mine 1 (2nd), 2 (2nd)
Phelps Dodge Corporation, Morenci Mine	4	5–8	
Phelps Dodge Corporation, New Cornelia Branch Mine	7	1–5, 3 (second) 4 (second)	1, 2, 3 (1st), 4 (1st) to Morenci Mine 1-4, Morenci Mine 1, 2 returned to New Cornelia Branch 1, 2, Morenci Mine 3, 4 then to Lavender Pit 3, 4, then returned to New Cornelia Branch 3 (third), 4 (third), 5 to Lavender Pit 5, returned to New Cornelia Branch 5
Philadelphia, Bethlehem and New England Railroad	8	219, 222–225, 26–28	219, 222–225 renumbered 21–25
Reading Company	8	90–92, 100–104	
Republic Steel Corporation	1	D-815	
River Terminal Railway	1	60	
Seaboard Air Line Railroad	7	1406–1412	1406–1407, 1409-1412 to Seaboard Coast Line Railroad 31-36
Southern Railway	69	2200–2204, 2206–2207, 2233–2284, 6050–6056, 6850, 6851, 8560	6050-6056 were Cincinnati, New Orleans and Texas Pacific, 6850-6851 were New Orleans and Northeastern Railroad, 8560 was St. Johns River Terminal, 2235 renumbered 6504, then 2200-2204, 2206, 2207, 2233, 2234, 2236–2284, 6050-6056, 6504, 6850, 6851, 6560 renumbered 1018-1086
Southern Pacific Company	50	1310–1319, 1403–1425, 72–88	72-88 were Texas & New Orleans, 1310–1319, 72-88, 1403-1425 renumbered 1904-1953
Spokane, Portland and Seattle Railway	3	40–42	to Burlington Northern 593–595
St. Louis Southwestern Railway	4	1050–1053	Renumbered to 1900-1903
St. Louis–San Francisco Railway	16	250–265	
Tennessee Coal, Iron and Railroad	3	900–902	
Terminal Railroad Association of St. Louis	17	551–567	
Texas and Pacific Railway	20	1000–1019	
Toronto, Hamilton and Buffalo Railway	4	51–54	
Tucson, Cornelia and Gila Bend Railroad	1	52	
Union Pacific Railroad	95	1001–1095	
Union Railroad	20	536–555	
United States Navy, Fallbrook Naval Ammunition Depot	4	1–4	
United States Navy, Hawthorne, Nevada	1	44	
Wabash Railroad	3	350–352	to Norfolk and Western Railway 3350–3352, 3350 to Des Moines Union Railway 7
West Virginia Northern Railroad	2	50–51	
Wheeling and Lake Erie Railway	4	D-1–D-4	to New York, Chicago & St. Louis Railroad 95-98, NKP 95-97 then to Wabash 347-349, NKP 98 to Des Moines Union 5, WAB 347 then to Des Moines Union Railway 6, 348-349 to Norfolk & Western 3348-3349
Wheeling Steel Company	1	1251	
Total	1,145		

=== TR (cow–calf) ===
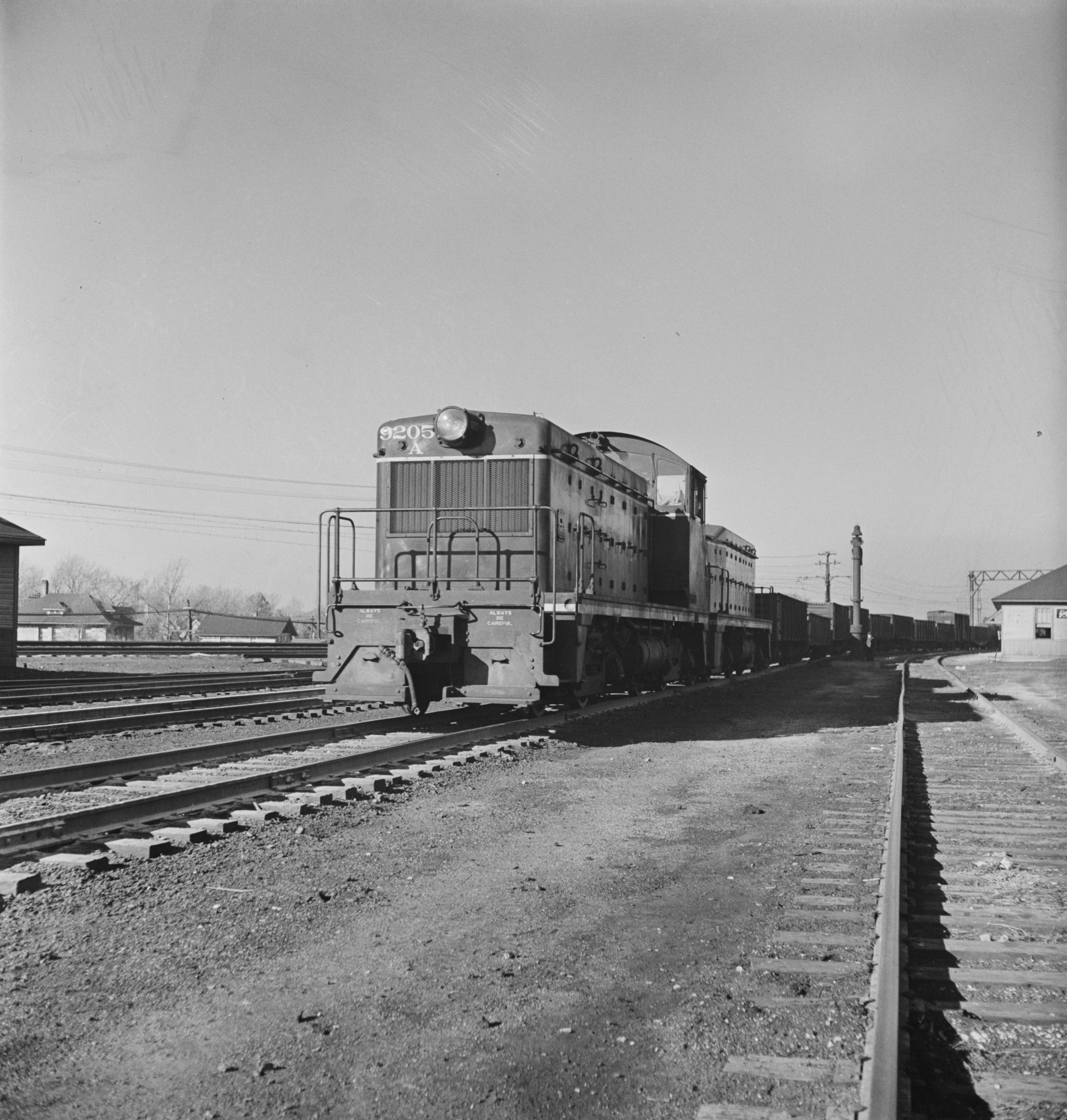
EMD TR #9205

Railroad	Road numbers A units	Road numbers B units	Notes
Illinois Central Railroad	9203A-9205A	9203B–9205B	renumbered 1026AB-1027AB, 1075, 1235
Total	3	3	

=== TR2 (cow–calf) ===
Railroad	Road numbers A units	Road numbers B units	Notes
Electro-Motive Division (demonstrator)	912A	912B	to CB&Q 9400AB, rebuilt to NW2's, to Burlington Northern 546-547
Belt Railway of Chicago	500A-501A	500B-501B	renumbered 500, 510, 501, 511
Chicago, Burlington and Quincy Railroad	9401A-9413A	9401B–9413B	rebuilt to NW2's, to Burlington Northern 548-573
Chicago and North Western Railway	2000A-2001A	2000B-2001B	2000A, 2001A renumbered 1009, 1010, 2000B, 2001B to slugs BU-4, BU-5
Chicago Great Western Railroad	58A-66A	58B–66B	to Chicago & North Western 58AB-66AB, 58A-61A, 63A-65A renumbered 1035, 1000, 1034, 1011, 1015, 1013, 1014, 58B-61B, 63B-65B renumbered 1106, 1107, 1105, 1101, 1104, 1102, 1103
Illinois Central Railroad	9206A-9208A	9206B–9208B	renumbered 1028AB-1030AB
Milwaukee Road	2000A	2000B	renumbered 696AB
Southern Railway	2400A-2404A	2400B–2404B	renumbered 2400/2450-2404/2454
Total	36	36	

=== TR3 (cow–calf–calf) ===
Railroad	Quantity A units	Quantity B units	Notes
Chesapeake and Ohio Railway	6500A-6501A	6500B,C, 6501B,C	renumbered 9552, 9554, 9556, 9555, 9557, 9553, then 9553, 9555-9557 to Chicago South Shore and South Bend 606, 602-604, returned to Chesapeake & Ohio 9553, 9555-9557, then 9552-9557 to Baltimore & Ohio 9552-9557
Total	2	4	

== Preservation ==
Numerous NW2s remain in revenue service in North America, but most have been retired. Some examples that have been preserved include:

- Canadian National #7944 at the Alberta Railway Museum in Edmonton, Alberta
- Milwaukee Road #1648 on the Boone & Scenic Valley Railroad in Boone, Iowa
- Milwaukee Road #1649 at the Monticello Railway Museum in Monticello, Illinois
- Southern Pacific #1423 on the Niles Canyon Railway in Sunol, California

== See also ==
- List of GM-EMD locomotives
