= EMD SD89MAC =

Prototype diesel locomotive

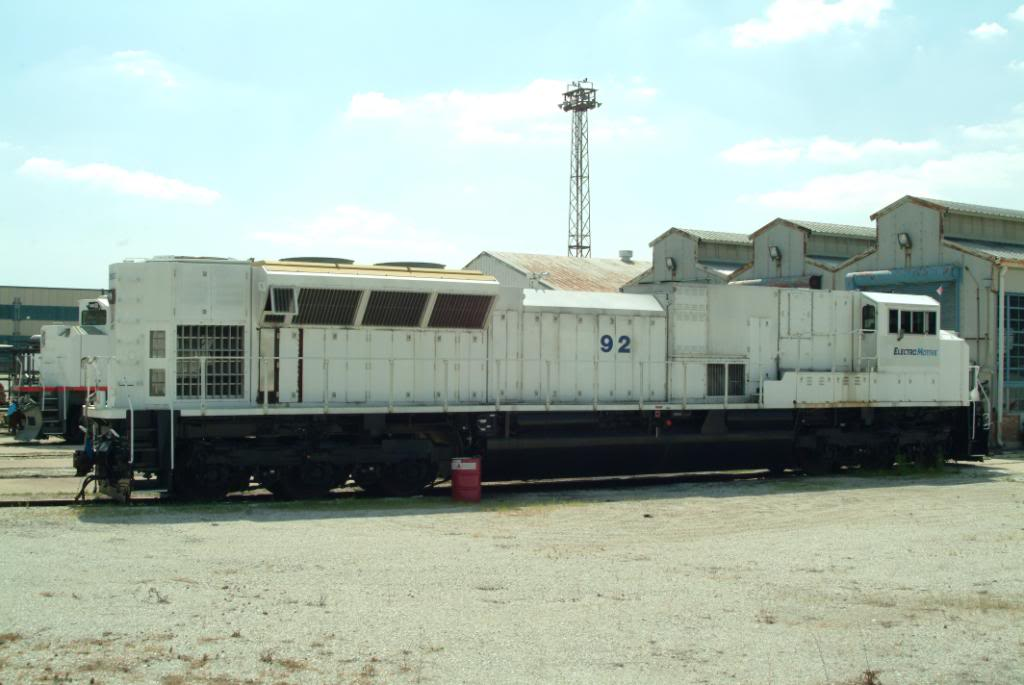
- Side/rear view of the only SD89MAC produced
Type and origin
- Power type: Diesel-electric
- Builder: Electro-Motive Diesel (EMD)
- Model: SD89MAC
- Build date: June 2000
- Total produced: 1
Specifications
- Configuration
  - AAR: C-C
- Gauge: 4 ft 8 1/2 in (1,435 mm)
- Prime mover: EMD H-Engine
- Cylinders: V12
- Transmission: diesel electric
Performance figures
- Power output: 4,500 hp (3,360 kW)
Career
- Numbers: GM 92
- Disposition: Used as a test bed by EMD

The EMD SD89MAC was a 4,500 horsepower (3,360 kW) C-C diesel-electric locomotive produced by General Motors Electro-Motive Division. Along with the SD80MAC and SD90MAC, the SD89MAC was one of the largest single-engine locomotives produced by EMD. The SD89MAC featured radial steering trucks and an isolated cab which was mounted on shock absorbers to reduce vibration. The SD89MAC used AC traction motor technology. Like the SD90MAC, it was a hood unit fitted with a safety cab and has an enlarged radiator section, nearly the entire width of the locomotive, which makes it easy to spot. The frame of GM 92, the only SD89MAC ever built, has since been retrofitted with a different engine for Tier 4 compliance tests conducted by EMD.

The SD89MAC was intended to be a less-powerful version of the SD90MAC, and eventual successor to the SD70 series. One demonstrator was built, but generated no orders.

== See also ==
- China Railways HXN3B
