= EMD 1010 =

EMD 265H

Overview
- Manufacturer: Electro-Motive Diesel
- Also called: H-Engine

Layout
- Configuration: V12 and V16
- Displacement: 1,010 cubic inches (16,600 cm^{3}) per cylinder
- Cylinder bore: 265 millimetres (10.4 in)
- Piston stroke: 300 millimetres (12 in)
- Cylinder block material: Iron
- Cylinder head material: Iron
- Valvetrain: 4 valves per cylinder
- Compression ratio: 15.3:1

Combustion
- Turbocharger: two low-inertia turbochargers
- Fuel system: Unit injector actuated by engine camshaft
- Management: Electronic
- Fuel type: Diesel
- Oil system: Wet sump
- Cooling system: Liquid-cooled

Output
- Power output: up to 4.7 MW (6,300 hp) for V16 engines; up to 3.52 MW (4,725 hp) for V12 engines.

Chronology
- Successor: EMD 1010

EMD 1010J

Overview
- Manufacturer: Electro-Motive Diesel
- Also called: J-Engine

Layout
- Configuration: V12
- Displacement: 1,010 cubic inches (16,600 cm^{3}) per cylinder
- Cylinder bore: 265 millimetres (10.4 in)
- Piston stroke: 300 millimetres (12 in)
- Cylinder block material: Iron
- Cylinder head material: Iron
- Valvetrain: 4 valves per cylinder
- Compression ratio: 15.3:1

Combustion
- Turbocharger: two-stage turbocharging with one high pressure turbocharger for low-mid RPM and two low pressure turbochargers for mid-high RPM
- Fuel system: common rail
- Management: Electronic
- Fuel type: Diesel
- Oil system: Wet sump
- Cooling system: Liquid-cooled

Output
- Power output: up to 3.43 MW (4,600 hp) for V12 engines

Emissions
- Emissions target standard: EPA IV or EU Non-road IV
- Emissions control systems: Exhaust gas recirculation

Chronology
- Predecessor: EMD 265H
- Successor: None (Note: According to Progress Rail that has been personally and privately contacted, the EMD 265H's successor would be the EMD 1010J. The Caterpillar C280 was the successor to the Caterpillar 3600 series. The EMD engines and the Caterpillar engines are their own separate entities. Therefore, for now, there is no successor to the EMD 1010J.)

The EMD 1010 or EMD 265 is a line of four-stroke diesel engines manufactured by Electro-Motive Diesel. The precursor to the 1010 was introduced around 1998 as the 265H or H-Engine. The H-engine was initially designed for use as a 6,300 hp (4,700 kW) 16‑cylinder, the EMD SD90MAC; however, the early engines were found to be unreliable, and unsuccessful in the market, with the proven EMD 710 2-stroke design being preferred. The EMD four-stroke engine was resurrected in 2015 to meet EPA Tier 4 emissions regulations.

== History ==
=== H-Engine ===
Development of the H-engine was announced in 1994 as a railway locomotive specific engine - the design was influenced by the transition to AC traction motors, which had increased adhesion and tractive effort characteristics, allowing an increase in usable power to be usefully converted traction - thus the new design was to have 6,000 horsepower (4,500 kW) available for traction - a 6000 hp locomotive design would allow one to replace two of the very common 3000 hp SD40-2 locomotives.

Instead of a development of its two stroke design, EMD chose to develop a new four stroke engine, with potential for reduced emissions being one factor in favor of the change of design. EMD had investigated the potential of four-stroke designs in 1984, building two prototype 4,500 horsepower (3,400 kW) 16‑cylinder 854H engines (with 854 cu.in. displacement per cylinder). However, EMD soon realized that to reach the 6000 hp goal, the prototypes were not enough. Therefore, the plan to use the 854H as the basis was abandoned and EMD decided to build a new design of engine with a larger displacement per cylinder, later named as the EMD 265H.

The new engine was designed using modern techniques, including 3D modelling, finite element analysis, computational fluid dynamics, and other simulations, as well as using real world fatigue and other testing. The initial locomotive designed to use the H-engine was the SD90MAC. The crankcase design switched to ductile cast iron from welded steel (in the 2 stroke series); like the 2-stroke designs the new engine incorporated unitized power assemblies. The V connecting rods switched from fork and blade to side by side and electronic fuel injection replaced mechanical fuel injection. Each engine incorporated two turbochargers, one per cylinder bank. Eight engines were produced and tested at the Transportation Technology Center under the management of the Association of American Railroads in Pueblo, Colorado.

The EMD 265H had a bore of 265 millimetres (10.4 in) and stroke of 300 millimetres (12 in) (so that the displacement per cylinder was 1010 cubic inches) with the 16‑cylinder GM16V265H rated at 4,700 kilowatts (6,300 hp) at 1000 rpm, with a brake mean effective pressure of 21.3 bars (2,130 kPa).

Union Pacific began using SD90MAC locomotives outfitted with H-Engines in commercial service in 1998.

Initial orders for the 265H engine powered locomotives were delivered powered by 4300 hp EMD 710 engines (referred to as SD9043MAC), intended to be converted to the 4 stroke design later once the engine's teething troubles were resolved. Canadian Pacific, Union Pacific and lessor CIT Group acquired this locomotive type. Only CP and UP operated H-engine powered units (SD90MAC-H). UP's fleet was returned to EMD after the lease expired. Considered unsuccessful in the domestic market due to reliability problems and limited operational flexibility of the 6000 horsepower engine, all 265H-powered versions in North America and Australia have been retrofitted with 4300 horsepower 16V710G engines or scrapped.

EMD also built one SD89MAC demonstrator, EMDX 92, as the less powerful version of the SD90MAC. It used a V12 version of the 265H engine (12-265H) generating 4500 hp. Initially the SD89MAC was intended to be the successor of the EMD SD70 Series. However, none were ordered.

The 265H engine was also used overseas: in 2005 an order for 300 6,000 horsepower (4,500 kW) Tier 2 engines was received from the Chinese Railways, with final assembly at the Dalian Locomotive Factory, introduced from 2009 as "Harmony" HXN3 class. Orders were also received from India and Australian mining railroads. Tidewater Marine acquired twenty 16-cylinder engines for marine use in tugboats in 2002.

The 16-265H remains the most powerful diesel engine ever produced by EMD.

=== J-Engine ===
To meet EPA Tier 4 emission standards for nitrogen oxides (NOx), manufacturers rely on one of two methods: exhaust gas recirculation (EGR), where exhaust gases are cooled and recirculated back through the combustion cycle, or selective catalytic reduction (SCR) using urea-based diesel exhaust fluid, which converts NOx in the catalytic converter to elemental nitrogen and water. Although EGR requires a diesel particulate filter, it is the preferred solution for Class I operators, as SCR adds another consumable with handling and storage problems by maintenance personnel.

The four-stroke engine design was re-introduced in the mid-2010s to meet Tier 4 without using SCR. Although EMD had experimented with modifying the 710 to meet Tier 4, the prototype proved to be too heavy and inefficient to be practical. The first (pre-production) locomotive using the 1010J engine, the SD70ACe-T4, using a 4,600 horsepower (3,400 kW) (4,400 traction hp) 12 cylinder engine was unveiled in late 2015. Testing of the new locomotives began in the Spring of 2016. The first two units of a 65 unit order for the new locomotive were delivered to Union Pacific in December 2016.

The block designation was changed to J to reflect the changes to the new engine, which included power assembly and block redesigns, as well as the addition of a two-stage turbocharging system consisting of three turbochargers. Other new features are an EGR system to reduce exhaust emissions and double-walled fuel injection to increase safety.

== Versions ==
| ID | Number of cylinders | Induction | Max rpm | Power (hp) | Power (MW) | Introduced | Locomotive(s) |
|---|---|---|---|---|---|---|---|
| 12-265H | 12 | 2 x Turbocharger | 1000 | 4,725 | 3.52 | 1996 | SD89MAC |
| 16-265H | 16 | 2 x Turbocharger | 1000 | 6,300 | 4.7 | 1996 | SD90MAC, JT56ACe (China Railways HXN3) |
| 12-1010J | 12 | 3 x Turbocharger | 1000 | 4,600 | 3.4 | 2015 | SD70ACe-T4 |

== See also ==
- EMD 567, EMD 645, EMD 710 - previous 2-stroke engines by EMD
