= EMD 710 =

Diesel engine

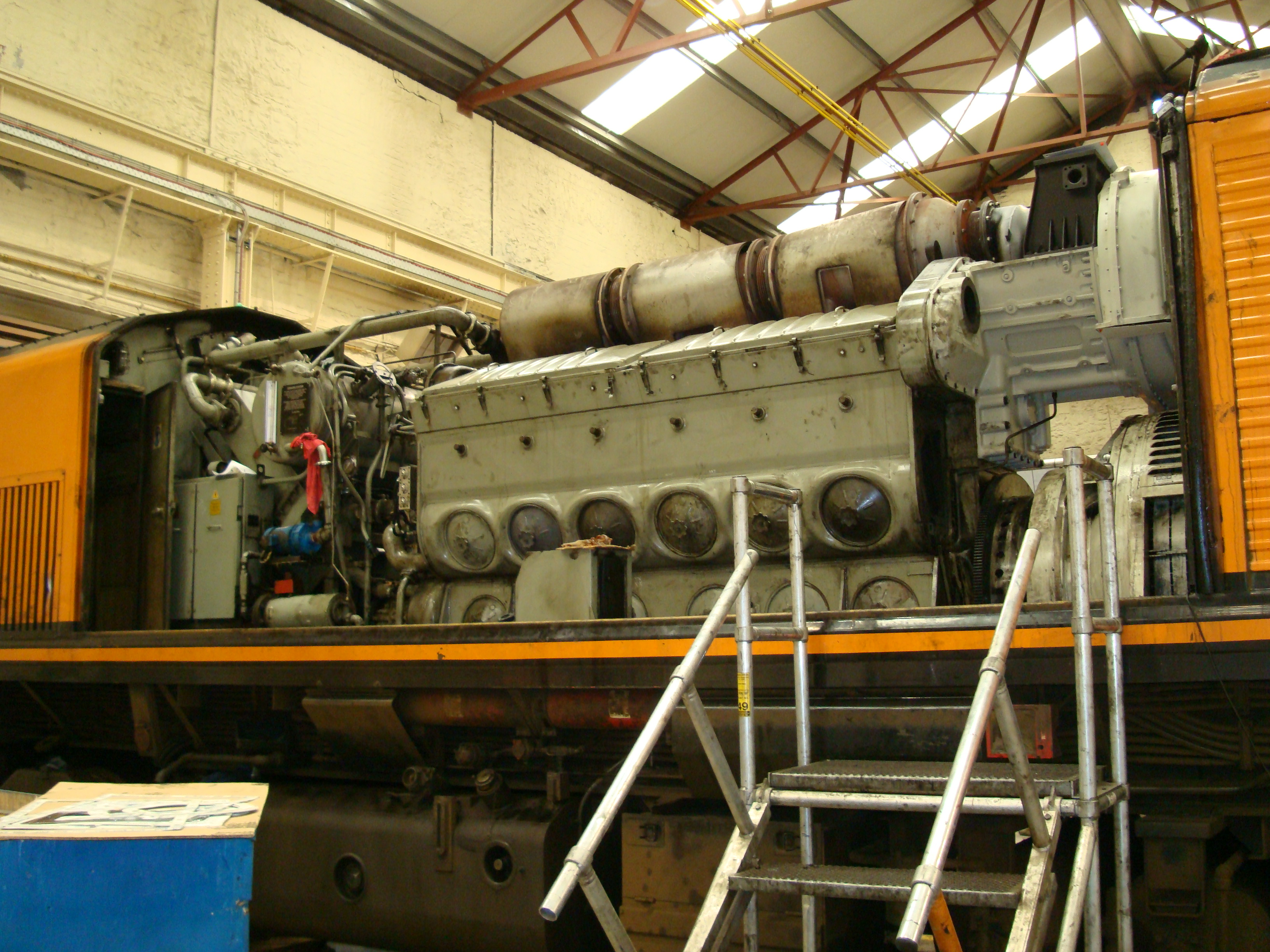
- An EMD 12-710G3B engine, installed in an Iarnród Éireann 201 class (EMD JT42HCW) locomotive

Overview
- Manufacturer: Electro-Motive Diesel
- Also called: G-Engine
- Production: April 23, 1983–present

Layout
- Configuration: V8, V12, V16, and V20
- Displacement: 710 cubic inches (11,600 cm^{3}) per cylinder
- Cylinder bore: 9 1/16 in (230 mm)
- Piston stroke: 11 in (280 mm)
- Cylinder block material: Flat, formed and rolled structural steel members, and steel forgings, integrated into a weldment
- Cylinder head material: Cast iron, one per cylinder
- Valvetrain: 4 Valves per cylinder, SOHC exhaust only
- Compression ratio: 15.3:1

RPM range
- Idle speed: 200
- Max. engine speed: 900-904-906-910-950

Combustion
- Supercharger: Centrifugal
- Turbocharger: Hybrid turbocharger, below half throttle, clutch-driven blower takes over
- Fuel system: Unit injector, actuated by engine camshaft
- Management: Electronic
- Fuel type: Diesel
- Oil system: Wet sump
- Cooling system: Liquid cooling

Output
- Power output: 203 kilowatts (272 hp) per cylinder

Dimensions
- Dry weight: up to 25.57 tonnes (25.17 long tons; 28.19 short tons)

Chronology
- Predecessor: EMD 645
- Successor: EMD 1010 - the heavily redesigned and refined EMD 265H to meet Tier-4 emission standard

The EMD 710 is a line of diesel engines built by Electro-Motive Diesel (previously General Motors' Electro-Motive Division). The 710 series replaced the earlier EMD 645 series when the 645F series proved to be unreliable in the early 1980s 50-series locomotives which featured a maximum engine speed of 950 rpm. (Note: 40-series versions of the 645, save the initial teething problems with the 20-645E, which were eventually resolved, proved to be exceptionally reliable.) The EMD 710 is a relatively large medium-speed two-stroke diesel engine that has 710 cubic inches (11.6 liters) displacement per cylinder, and a maximum engine speed of 900 rpm. (Note: Same parts suitable for 1000 rpm speed, yet rated lower because of earlier problems in EMD 645. Factory-fitted governor limits to 900 rpm.)

In 1951, E. W. Kettering (son of Charles F. Kettering) wrote a paper for the ASME entitled, History and Development of the 567 Series General Motors Locomotive Engine, which goes into great detail about the technical obstacles that were encountered during the development of the 567 engine. These same considerations apply to the 645 and 710, as these engines were a development of the 567C, applying a cylinder bore increase (645) and a stroke increase (710), to achieve a greater power output, without changing the external size or weight of the engines, thereby achieving significant improvements in horsepower per unit volume and horsepower per unit weight.

Since its introduction, EMD has continually upgraded the 710G diesel engine. Power output has increased from 3,800 horsepower (2,800 kW) on 1984's 16-710G3A to 4,500 horsepower (3,400 kW) (as of 2012) on the 16-710G3C-T2, although most current examples are 4,300 horsepower (3,200 kW).

The 710 has proved to be exceptionally reliable, although the earlier 645 is still supported and most 645 service parts are still in new production, as many 645E-powered GP40-2 and SD40-2 locomotives are still operating after four decades of service. These often serve as a benchmark for engine reliability, which the 710 would meet and eventually exceed. A significant number of non-SD40-2 locomotives (SD40, SD45, SD40T-2, and SD45T-2, and even some SD50s) have been rebuilt to the equivalent of SD40-2s with new or remanufactured engines and other subsystems, using salvaged locomotives as a starting point. Some of these rebuilds have been made using new 12-cylinder 710 engines in place of the original 16-cylinder 645 engines, retaining the nominal rating of 3000 horsepower, but with lower fuel consumption.

Over the production span of certain locomotive models, upgraded engine models have been fitted when these became available. For example, an early 1994-built SD70MAC had a 16-710G3B, whereas a later 2003-built SD70MAC would have a 16-710G3C-T1.

The engine is produced in V8, V12, V16, and V20 configurations; most current locomotive production uses the V16 engine, whereas most current marine and stationary engine applications use the V20 engine.

== Specifications ==
All 710 engines are two-stroke 45° V engines. The 710 model was introduced in 1985 and has a 1-inch (25 mm) longer stroke (now 11 in or 279 mm) than the 645 (10 in or 254 mm stroke). The engine is uniflow scavenged with four poppet exhaust valves in the cylinder head. For maintenance, a power assembly, consisting of a cylinder head, cylinder liner, piston, piston carrier, and piston rod can be individually and relatively easily and quickly replaced. The block is made from flat, formed, and rolled structural steel members and steel forgings welded into a single structure (a "weldment"). Blocks may, therefore, be easily repaired, if required, using conventional shop tools. Each bank of cylinders has a camshaft which operates the exhaust valves and the unit injectors.

Pre-1995 engines have mechanically controlled unit injectors (UIs), patented in 1934 by General Motors, EMD's former owner. Post-1995 engines have electronic unit injectors (EUIs) which fit within the same space as a mechanical unit injector. (Note: The camshaft still operates the unit injector's built-in plunger pump, but the electronics control the timing of certain events within the unit injector, as directed by the engine control system.) The use of EUI is EMD's implementation of non-common-rail electronic fuel injection on its large-displacement diesel engines.

See EMD 645 for general specifications common to all 567, 645, and 710 engines.

Unlike the 567 or 645, which could use either Roots blowers or a turbocharger, the 710 engine is only offered with turbocharging. The turbocharger is gear-driven and has an overrunning clutch that allows it to act as a centrifugal blower at low engine speeds (when exhaust gas flow and temperature alone are insufficient to drive the turbine) and a purely exhaust-driven turbocharger at higher speeds. The turbocharger can revert to acting as a supercharger during demands for large increases in engine output power.

While more expensive to maintain than Roots blowers, EMD claims that this design allows "significantly" reduced fuel consumption and emissions, improved high-altitude performance, and even up to a 50 percent increase in maximum rated horsepower over Roots-blown engines for the same engine displacement. But, unlike the earlier 645 and 567, which could use either turbochargers or Roots blowers, the turbocharger is a standard feature of most 710 models.

Horsepower for any naturally aspirated engine is usually derated at 2.5% per 1,000 feet (300 m) above mean sea level, a penalty which becomes extremely large at altitudes of 10,000 feet (3,000 m) or greater as power losses would exceed 25%. Forced induction effectively eliminates this derating.

Some 710 engines have been converted to, or even delivered as, Roots-blown engines with conventional exhaust-driven turbochargers. Others have received modifications that permit lower fuel consumption (but possibly at the expense of higher NOx emissions or reduced power output), lower emissions, or even higher power (at the expense of increased fuel consumption).

== Rail versions ==
ID	Engine type	Max RPM	Power (hp)	Power (MW)	Introduced	Locomotive(s)
8-710G3A-T2	V8	900	2150	1.6	2007	GT38ACe, GT38LC, GT38ACL, Romanian Class 63, Class 65, Class 66-2, EGM-621, GP22ECO, SD22ECO
8-710G3A-T3	V8	900	2150	1.6	2007	GP20ECO, SD20ECO
8-710G3B-T2	V8	900	2200	1.6	2009-2010	JT38CW-DC
12-710G3A	V12	900	3000	2.2	1985	GP59, F59PH, AT42C, JT42C.
12-710G3A-T2	V12	900	3150	2.3	2007	SD32ECO EFI equipped.
12-710G3C-U2	V12	950	3150	2.3	2006	Euro 3000/AC EFI equipped.
12-710G3C-EC	V12	950	3200	2.3	1993	F59PHI EFI equipped.
12N-710G3B-EC	V12	900	3200	2.5	1998	British Rail Class 66, British Rail Class 67, British Rail Class 69, Irish Rail 201 Class, RENFE Class 334, EMD DE/DM30AC, Sri Lanka Railways M11
12N-710G3B-ES	V12	900	3200	2.4	1998	WAGR S class (diesel), Downer EDI Rail GT42CU AC, Downer EDI Rail GT42CU ACe, Downer EDI Rail JT42C-DC
12N-710G3B-EES	V12	900	3300	2.5	2017	GT42AC, GT42ACL
16-710G3A	V16	900	3800	2.8	1984	GP60, GP60M, GP60B, SD60, SD60M, SD60I, SD60F, JT46C, GT46CWM.
16-710G3B	V16	900	4000	3.0	1992	Early SD70, SD70M, SD70MAC and SD70I.
16-710G3B-EC	V16	900	4000	3.0	1997	SD70, SD70M, SD70M and SD70I models equipped with electronic fuel injection (EFI)|GT46MAC and GT46PAC (Indian Rail Class WDG-4 and WDP-4)
16N-710G3B-EC	V16	950	4500	3.4	2008	GT46PACe and JT46PACe (WDP-4B and WDP-4D), GT46ACe and JT46ACe (WDG-4 and WDG-4D), SD70ACu
16-710G3B-ES	V16	900	4000	3.1	1997	Downer EDI Rail GT46C
16-710G3B-T1	V16	900	4000-4200	3.0-3.1	2003	EPA Tier 1 Emissions compliant/EFI Equipped SD70M, SD70MAC, Alstom PL42AC EPA Tier I emissions compliant/EFI equipped.
16-710G3B-T2	V16	900	4000	3.0	2005	SD70M-2 (Norfolk Southern), MP40PH-3C EPA Tier II emissions compliant/EFI equipped.
16-710G3C	V16	950	4300	3.2	1995	SD75M, SD75I.
16-710G3C-EC	V16	950	4300	3.2	1995	SD75M, SD75I, EMD SD70 SD90/43MAC EFI equipped.
16-710G3C-ES	V16	950	4300	3.2	2007	Downer EDI Rail GT46C ACe
16-710G3C-T1	V16	950	4300	3.2	2003	SD70M (late model), SD70MAC (late model)
16-710G3C-T2	V16	950	4300-4500	3.2	2004	SD70ACe, SD70M-2, SD70ACS, SD70ACe/45South Africa Prasa Afro 4000, EPA Tier II emissions compliant/EFI equipped.
16-710G3C-U2	V16	950	4300	3.2	2006	Euro 4000 EFI equipped.
20-710G3B-ES	V20	900	5000	3.7	1995	SD80MAC EFI equipped,
20N-710G3B-EC	V20	900	5500	4.1	2011	GT50AC (IR WDG-5) EFI equipped, SD80ACu (Proposed SD80MAC Rebuild Programme, Now Cancelled)
20-710G3C-ES	V20	950	5300	3.9	2011	SD80ACe EPA Tier 1 Emissions compliant.

== Stationary/marine versions ==
EMD E23G

Overview
- Manufacturer: Progress Rail

Layout
- Configuration: V8, V12, V16, and V20
- Displacement: 710 cubic inches (11,600 cm^{3}) per cylinder
- Cylinder bore: 9 1/16 in (230 mm)
- Piston stroke: 11 in (280 mm)
- Cylinder block material: Flat, formed and rolled structural steel members, and steel forgings, integrated into a weldment
- Cylinder head material: Cast iron, one per cylinder
- Valvetrain: 4 Valves per cylinder
- Compression ratio: 16:1

RPM range
- Idle speed: 315
- Max. engine speed: 904

Combustion
- Supercharger: Centrifugal
- Turbocharger: Hybrid turbocharger, below half throttle, clutch-driven blower takes over
- Fuel system: Unit injector, actuated by engine camshaft
- Management: Electronic
- Fuel type: Natural gas
- Oil system: Wet sump
- Cooling system: Liquid cooling

Output
- Power output: 193 kilowatts (259 hp) per cylinder

Dimensions
- Dry weight: up to 25.85 tonnes (25.44 long tons; 28.49 short tons)

Chronology
- Predecessor: none, this variant is a conversion
- Successor: Caterpillar CG170

Like most EMD engines, the 710 is also sold for stationary and marine applications.

Stationary and marine installations are available with either a left or right-hand rotating engine.

Marine engines differ from railroad and stationary engines mainly in the shape and depth of the engine's oil sump, which has been altered to accommodate the rolling and pitching motions encountered in marine applications.

Engine Speed

- Full . . . . . . . . . . . . . . 900 RPM
- Idle . . . . . . . . . . . . . . 350 RPM

Compression Ratio . . 16:1

Brake Horsepower (ABS Rating)

- Model 710G7 Engines
  - 8-cylinder: 1800
  - 12-cylinder: 2800
  - 16-cylinder: 3600
  - 20-cylinder: 4300

== See also ==
- EMD 567
- EMD 645
- EMD 1010
