= Electronically controlled unit injector =

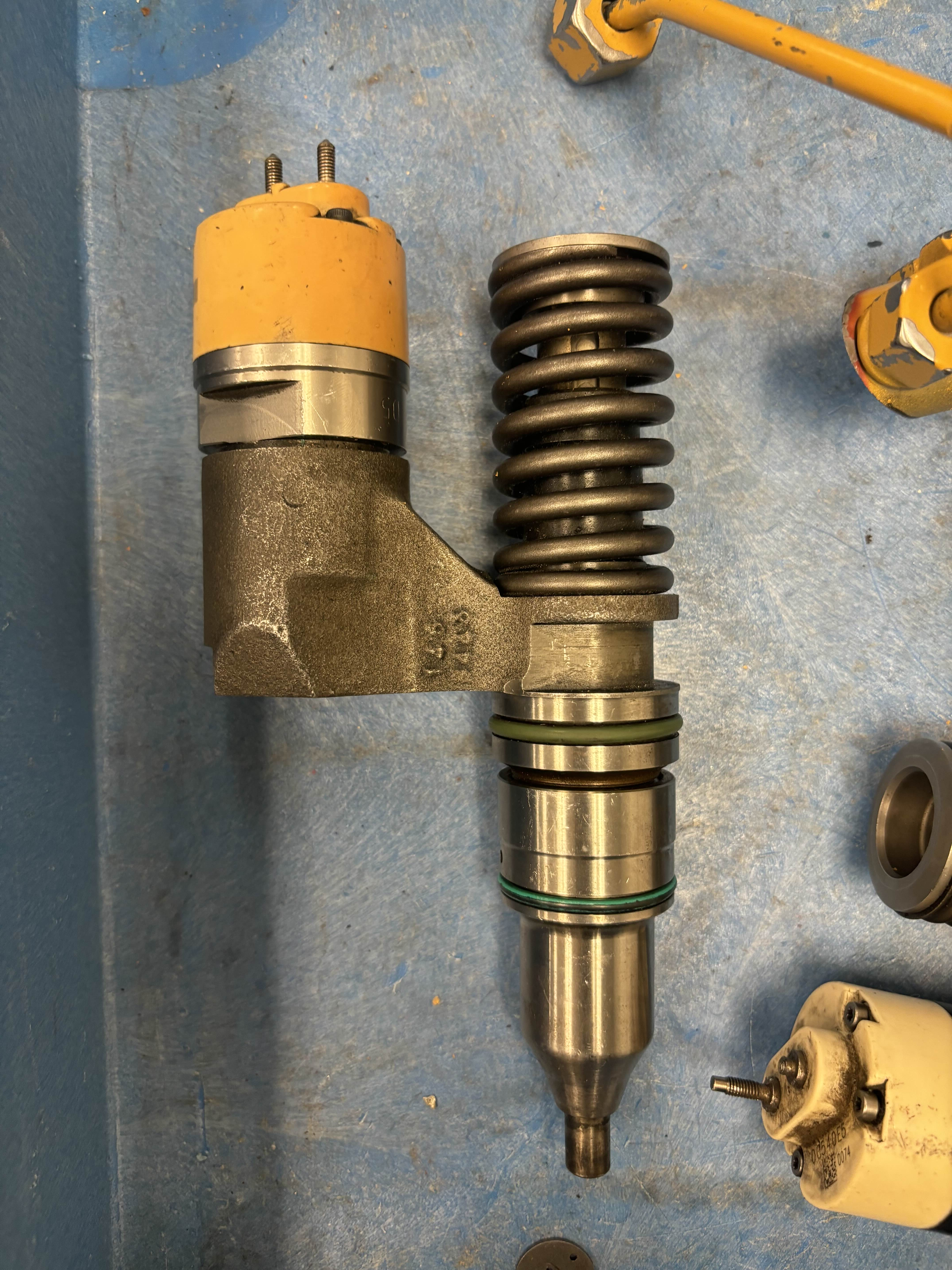
Mechanical Actuated Electronically Controlled Unit Injector from a Caterpillar 3406e

An electronically controlled unit injector (EUI) sometimes referred to as a mechanical electronic unit injector (MEUI) is a unit injector (UI) with electronic control. It performs the same function as a conventional unit injector in an internal combustion engine, such as in an on-road or off-road vehicle or a diesel-electric locomotive. The pressurized delivery of fuel is camshaft-driven, but the timing of the injector's internal operations are controlled by the engine control unit so as to achieve certain advantages.

== Advantages ==
- Maximum horsepower, within the applicable emissions tier
- Minimum emissions, possibly at the expense of slightly increased fuel consumption
- Minimum fuel consumption, possibly at the expense of slightly increased emissions
- Optimum vehicle performance

== Construction ==
Central to the EUI is the built-in plunger pump, which, just as in a UI, allows for low-pressure fuel delivery and return to all injectors, yet provides exceptionally high pressure and concomitant injection and atomization of the fuel to a cylinder during the engine's power cycles. As in a UI, the injector is connected to common banks of fuel supply and fuel return. Fuel is always circulating within the EUI as two of its functions, other than injection for combustion, are injector lubrication and injector cooling. Connections on UIs are by formed steel tubes. Connections on EUIs are by stainless steel-reinforced hoses.

The controlled part of the injector is a solenoid-operated spill valve. Normally, it is open, allowing the fuel to return to the supply line when the pump plunger descends. When the solenoid is energized, the spill valve closes, and the fuel is forced through the spray tip into the cylinder.

The four phases of EUI operation are:

Fill phase
As the pump plunger retracts, fuel is drawn into the pump chamber from the fuel supply line.
Spill phase
The pump plunger begins descending, but the spill valve is open, and fuel recirculates back to the return line.
Injection phase
Partway through the pump stroke, the solenoid is energized, which closes the spill valve. The fuel is forced into the cylinder through the spray tip.
Pressure reduction phase
Toward the end of the pump stroke, the spill valve is re-opened, allowing the fuel to recirculate again and ending the injection phase.

Thus, although the mechanical plunger pump has a fixed stroke, electronic control can select any part of that stroke to deliver to the cylinder, thereby controlling the volume and timing of fuel delivery.

== Users ==
This system is employed primarily on Electro-Motive Diesel (EMD) locomotive, marine and stationary engines, and primarily on the 710 family of diesel engines.

== Locomotive use ==
When implemented in a locomotive, the ECU may also be incorporated into the Locomotive Control Unit (LCU), which performs a variety of functions, such as wheel-slip control, "phone home" for incident reporting and scheduling of delivery of service parts, etc. EMD's LCU is often GPS-assisted, and maintenance personnel can effectively monitor the performance of perhaps thousands of locomotives at all times.

EMD has released updated LCU software, and EIUs which complement that software, which allows mixing Tier-1 and Tier-0 injectors within the same engine, and yet meets the applicable emissions tier for that engine. A specific benefit is reduced inventory of injectors.

A significant feature of the new EUIs is reduced "smoke". Also improved fuel economy. Indeed, the new "Tier 1/Tier 0" injectors are also applicable to locomotives which are not certified to any Tier, and the same "smoke" reduction and fuel economy benefits apply thereto.
