= China Railways HXN3 =

Class of Chinese diesel-electric locomotives

HXN3 JT56ACe 和谐内3
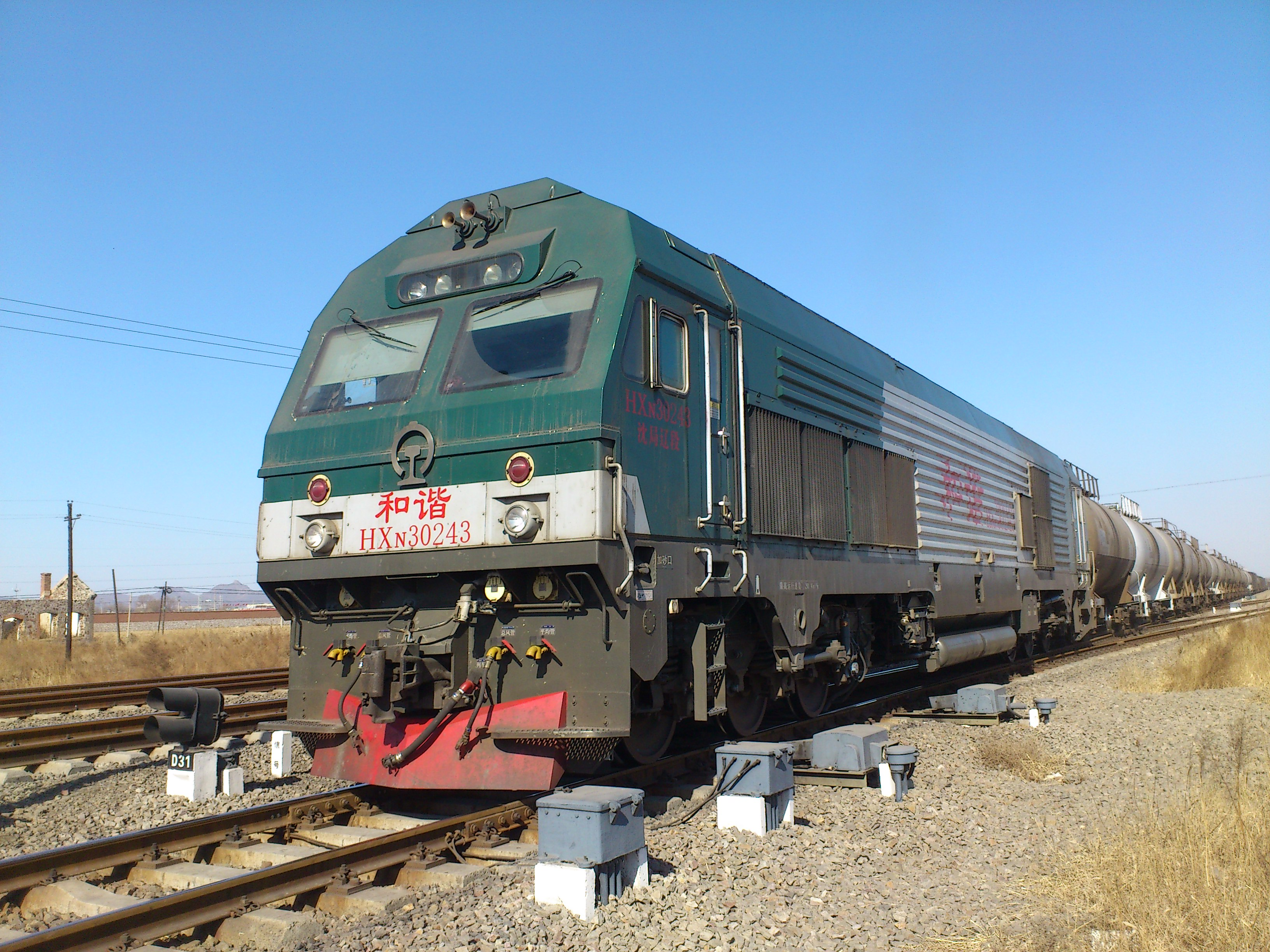
- HXN3-0243
Type and origin
- Power type: Diesel-electric
- Builder: EMD (USA), Dalian Locomotive Works
- Model: JT56ACe
- Build date: 2008－2014
- Total produced: 334
Specifications
- Configuration
  - UIC: Co′Co′
- Gauge: 1,435 mm (4 ft 8 1/2 in)
- Wheel diameter: 1,050 mm (41.3 in)
- Minimum curve: 250 m (12 ch)
- Axle load: 25 t (24.6 long tons; 27.6 short tons)
- Loco weight: 150 t (147.6 long tons; 165.3 short tons)
- Prime mover: EMD H-Engine 16-265H
- Engine type: Four-stroke diesel
- Cylinders: V16
- Transmission: Electric（AC—DC—AC）
Performance figures
- Maximum speed: 120 km/h (75 mph)
- Power output: 6,300 hp (4,700 kW); 5,550 hp (4,140 kW) @ wheel
- Tractive effort: 620 kN (140,000 lb_{f}) (starting); 598 kN (134,000 lb_{f})@24 km/h (15 mph) (continuous)
Career
- Operators: China Railway
- Numbers: HX_{N}30001-HX_{N}30300; HX_{N}30301-HX_{N}30330; HX_{N}37001-HX_{N}37004
- Locale: China

The HXN3 (Chinese: 和谐内3) (EMD classification JT56ACe) is a 6,000 hp (4.5 MW) diesel-electric locomotive designed by Electro-Motive Diesel in the United States for export to China. All JT56ACe locomotives use AC traction motor technology and use the EMD H-Engine as their prime mover. The locomotives are capable of meeting the EPA's Tier 2 emissions regulations.

In September 2005, the People's Republic of China announced an order for 300 JT56ACe locomotives. The locomotives were jointly manufactured by EMD and China's own Dalian Locomotive Works. They are dual cab locomotives.

Number 0301 - 0330 are single cab locomotives. They are coupled back to back and used on Tibet line.

Number 7001 - 7004 are delivered to Shenhua Mining Group.

The locomotive has been deployed to Qinghai–Tibet railway in 2018.

== See also ==
- List of locomotives in China
- Electro-Motive Diesel
- EMD SD90MAC
- EMD 265
- China Railways HXN5
