= EMD SD90MAC =

Model of American diesel-electric locomotive

EMD SD90MAC and SD9043MAC
- Union Pacific EMD SD90MAC no. 8076
Type and origin
- Power type: Diesel-electric
- Builder: Electro-Motive Diesel (EMD)
- Model: SD90MAC
- Build date: 1995–2000
- Total produced: 657
Specifications
- Configuration
  - AAR: C-C
  - UIC: Co’Co’
- Gauge: 4 ft 8 1/2 in (1,435 mm)
- Wheel diameter: 45 in (1,100 mm)
- Length: 80 ft 2 in (24.43 m)
- Loco weight: 415,000 lb (188,000 kg) (SD9043MAC) and 425,000 lb (193,000 kg) (SD90MAC-H & SD90MAC-H2)
- Fuel capacity: 5,000 US gal (19,000 L; 4,200 imp gal)
- Sandbox cap.: 40 cu ft (1.1 m^{3})
- Prime mover: EMD 16-710 G3C-T1 and 16-265H
- RPM range: 225-1,000 rpm
- Engine type: V16 diesel
- Traction motors: 6 Siemens 1TB2830 AC motors
- Cylinders: 16
- Cylinder size: 10.45 in × 11.80 in (265 mm × 300 mm)
Performance figures
- Maximum speed: 70 mph (113 km/h)
- Power output: SD9043MAC: 4,300 hp (3,210 kW); SD90MAC: 6,000 hp (4,470 kW)
- Tractive effort: Small engine (SD9043MAC): 185,000 lbf (820 kN) starting, 147,000 lbf (650 kN) continuous Large engine (SD90MAC-H and SD90MAC-H2): 200,000 lbf (890 kN) starting, 165,000 lbf (730 kN) continuous
Career
- Operators: See table
- Nicknames: Big Macs
- Disposition: Some still in service, most rebuilt into SD70ACUs, one preserved

The EMD SD90MAC is a model of 6,000 hp (4,470 kW) C-C diesel-electric locomotive produced by General Motors Electro-Motive Division (EMD). It is, with the SD80MAC, the largest single-engined locomotives produced, and among the most powerful diesel-electric locomotives made by EMD, surpassed only by the dual-engined DDA40X.

The SD9043MAC is the 4,300 hp (3,210 kW) variant, using a 16-cylinder 710G engine instead of the H-engine, which was originally intended as a temporary alternative while EMD tried to solve the H-engine's issues. However, the accompanying upgrade program was never utilized by its customers.

The SD90MACs features include radial steering trucks with AC traction motors and an isolated safety cab which is mounted on shock absorbers to lessen vibrations in the cab. The SD90/43MACs and early 265H equipped SD90MACs are built with the WhisperCab like the SD70 series and SD80MAC, while later SD90MACs were equipped with the Phase 2 safety Cab with notches on the side of the nose similar to the SD70ACe. The SD90MAC, like the SD80MAC, SD70ACe, and SD70M-2, has a wide radiator section, nearly the entire width of the locomotive, which along with their size makes them easy to spot.

As of 2025, most SD90MACs have been rebuilt, being the 4300hp SD90/43MACs. The SD90MACs equipped with the 16 cylinder 265H have long been scrapped. Norfolk Southern had rostered 110 SD90MAC locomotives purchased or traded from Union Pacific or the CIT Group respectively, that have now all been rebuilt as EMD SD70ACU locomotives. Canadian Pacific has also converted their small fleet of long-stored SD90/43MACs into SD70ACUs as well.

== History ==
Union Pacific SD9043MAC locomotive No. 8027

The SD90MAC was introduced in 1995, along with the SD80MAC locomotives. The SD90MAC was designed to utilize the new 16-cylinder H-engine, while the SD80MAC was designed to use the 20-cylinder version of the existing 710G engine. However, technical problems with the 6,000 horsepower (4,500 kW) engine resulted in the first locomotives being shipped with 4,300 hp (3,210 kW) 16-cylinder 710G engines, making them similar to the SD70MACs. These locomotives were informally designated SD9043MAC by railroads that purchased them with the option to re-engine them with 6,000 hp (4,470 kW) engines when they became available. This upgrade program, however, was never taken advantage of by SD90MAC buyers due to reliability issues with the newer engine. Over 400 SD90MAC locomotives fitted with the 4,300 hp (3,210 kW) 710 engine were built.

In 1996, Electro-Motive Diesel entered full production on their 6,000 hp (4,470 kW), 16-cylinder H-engine, and all SD90MACs made from then on used that for its prime mover. Locomotives fitted with this engine are sometimes referred to as SD90MAC-H locomotives. Later versions of the SD90MAC-H feature a Phase II cab, with a new nose which offers higher visibility from the cab than the old nose. The SD90MAC-H did not prove popular with railroads and less than 70 were built, including Electro-Motive Diesel demonstrator units.

Since the SD90MAC-H had such a large prime mover, it didn't offer the same operational flexibility as smaller units, limiting its possible customer base to only the largest railroads. Also, since the H-engine was a new design, it hadn't reached the same level of reliability as EMD's previous engine. The low reliability on such a large engine was an especially bad combination since the loss of one engine in a train meant the loss of a larger percentage of pulling power than had a smaller engine failed. In the end, the SD90MAC-H was only delivered to two railroads; the Union Pacific and Canadian Pacific. The Canadian Pacific locomotives were part of an earlier order for 710-engine equipped SD90MAC locomotives that was still in production when Electro-Motive Diesel switched over to the H-engine.

Electro-Motive Diesel also tried offering a lower-power version of the SD90MAC with a 12-cylinder engine called the SD89MAC, but none were produced other than the prototype.

== Specifications ==
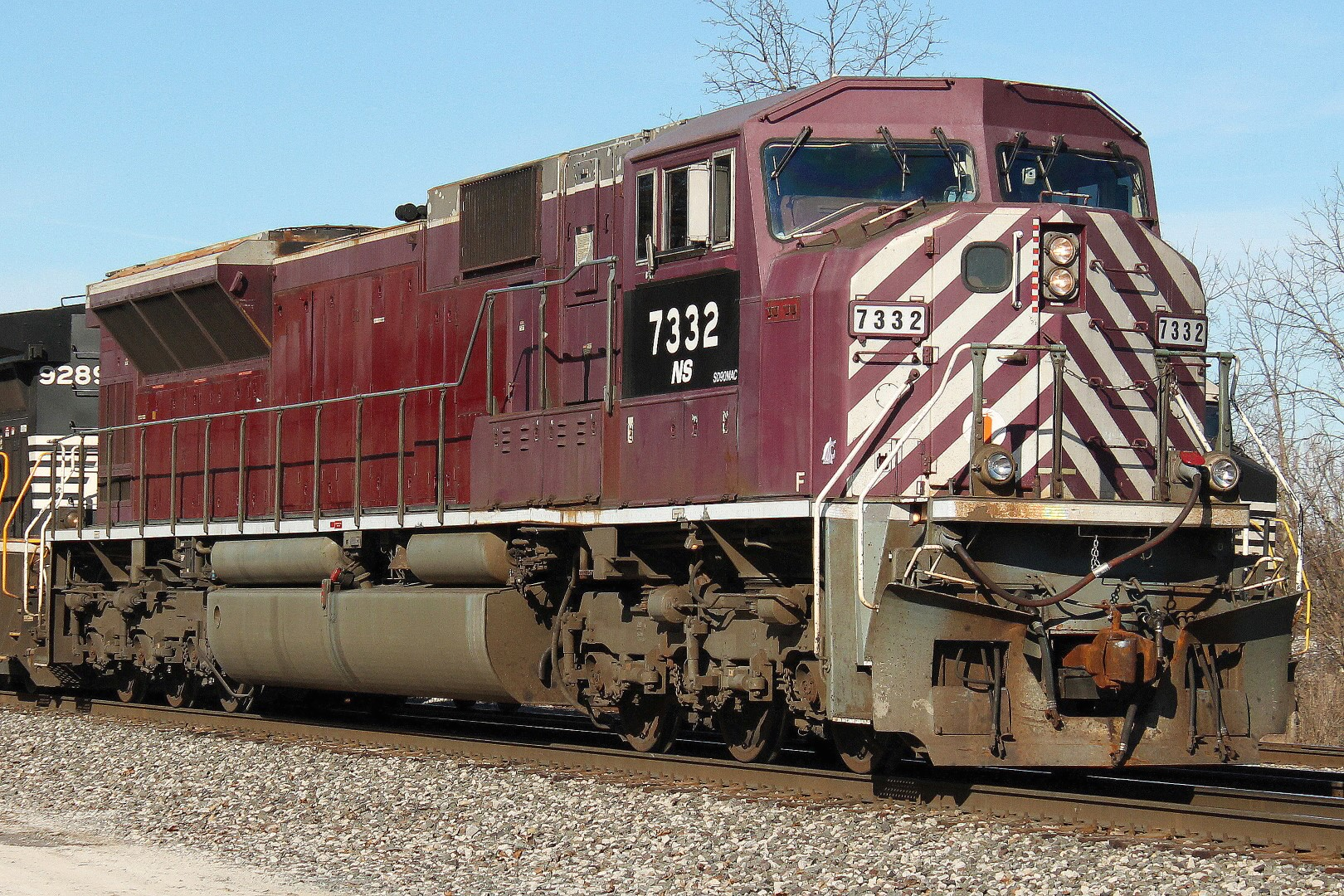
Norfolk Southern no. 7332 in Ohio

Prime mover (EMD 710):

- EMD V16 710G3C-T1
- Power Output - 4,300 hp or 3,210 kW at 900 rpm
- Idle - 200 rpm
- Full Speed - 950 rpm

Prime mover (EMD 265):

- EMD V16 EMD GM16V265
- Power Output - 6,000 hp or 4,470 kW at 1,000 rpm
- Idle - 200 rpm
- Full speed - 1,000 rpm

Traction motors:

- 6 Siemens 1TB2830 AC motors mounted 3 each on 2 HTCR-2 radial self-steering trucks.
- Rated output - 855 hp or 638 kW
- Gearing - 83:16
- Wheel size - 45 in (1,143 mm)
- Max revolutions - 3,435 rpm
- Starting torque - 16,300 N⋅m or 12,022 lbf⋅ft
- Continuous torque - 12,900 N⋅m or 9,515 lbf⋅ft
- Maximum voltage - 2,183 V

Performance (parenthesis indicate H-Engine equipped specifications):

- Maximum speed - 70 mph (113 km/h)
- Starting tractive effort - 185,000 lbf (820 kN) and 200,000 lbf (890 kN))
- Continuous tractive effort - 147,000 lbf (650 kN) and 165,000 lbf (730 kN))
- Braking effort - 115,000 lbf (510 kN)
- Weight - 210 short tons (188 long tons; 191 t)/420,000 lb or 190,500 kg

== Fleet rosters ==
| Image | Railroad | Quantity | Road Numbers | Notes |
SD9043MAC
| | Canadian Pacific | 61 | 9100-9160 | Units were at one time up for sale in "as is" condition, but no buyer was ever found. Some units had been intermittently placed into freight service to help combat motive power shortages. 30 of them will be rebuilt in 2019 as EMD SD70ACUs and renumbered 7000-7029. It was later announced that the order would be upped to 60 units in total, using the remainder of the 58 usable cores from the long-stored SD90MAC fleet and buying two SD90MACs from the Union Pacific to make up the difference. In 2021, Canadian Pacific purchased 40 more SD90MACs from Union Pacific for further continuation of the SD70ACU rebuild program. |
| | CEFX | 40 | 100-139 | Units are on lease fleet. 10 units traded to Norfolk Southern for 15 MP15DCs. |
| | Indiana Rail Road | 14 | 9001-9013, 9025 | These units are on long-term lease from CEFX. All retired in 2023 and replaced with 10 ex-Norfolk Southern SD70Ms. |
| | Norfolk Southern | 110 | 7229-7338 | NS purchased 100 units in September 2014 from EMD/Progress Rail. Those units are ex-UP. 10 units were acquired from CEFX in June 2016, in exchange for 15 MP15DCs. All units have been converted to SD70ACUs. 65 of them sold to PRLX. 30 of the PRLX units were sold to Ferromex in 2024. Unit 7314 was renumbered to 7339. |
| | Union Pacific | 309 | 8000-8308 | Most of them were renumbered 3470–3775 to make room for new GE ES44ACs. Both the Norfolk Southern and Canadian Pacific have purchased locomotives from Union Pacific's fleet for SD70ACU rebuilds; in September 2014, Norfolk Southern purchased 100 of these and in 2019 and 2021 Canadian Pacific purchased 42 of these in total. 8138 later renumbered to 3568, then donated to the Midwest Overland Rail Preservation Society in October of 2026. |
| | Fortescue | 5 | 905-909 | Ex Union Pacific Nos. 8527, 8530, 8531, 8541 & 8554, rebuilt from SD90MAC-Hs at Juniata Shops |
SD90MAC-H
| | Canadian Pacific | 4 | 9300-9303 | These were scrapped in Lachine, QC. |
| | EMLX | 40 | 8500, 8523-8561 | Former Union Pacific 8500, 8523-8561, currently stored. All leased to Kansas City Southern (KCS) in 2008 on a one-year lease. Several went to the Buffalo & Pittsburgh Railroad upon returning from KCS lease. All currently stored. 8522, 8527, 8529-8531, 8539, 8541, 8549 & 8554 sold in 2011 to Fortescue in Western Australia. Have since been sold to many different owners, primarily for scrap. |
| | Union Pacific | 62 | 8500-8561 | Fleet Retired, some after less than 5 years of service. 8500, 8523–8561 to EMLX Lease fleet, 8501-8522 renumbered 8911-8931. Retired in late 2008-2009. Sold to Metro East Industries in Alorton, Illinois. Scrapped mid to late 2009. |
| | Fortescue | 4 | 901-904 | ex Union Pacific Nos. 8522, 8529, 8539 & 8549, rebuilt Juniata Shops |
SD90MAC-PII
| | Fortescue | 8 | 910-917 | Ex Union Pacific Nos. 8538, 8548, 8550, 8557, 8525, 8533, 8543 & 8547, rebuilt by Progress Rail, Mayfield, Kentucky, all scrapped 2022. |

== Current status ==
Norfolk Southern SD70ACU No. 7236. The SD70ACU was part of Norfolk Southern's SD90MAC rebuild program.

As of January 2005, the SD90MAC is no longer in production due to the Environmental Protection Agency's Tier 2 locomotive emission regulations, although EMD had planned to be able to get the H-engine approved at some later date. However, China recently announced an order for 300 JT56ACe locomotives, which also use the H-Engine as its prime mover. A portion of the locomotives will be assembled in kit form by China's own Dalian Locomotive Works. These units were reportedly capable of meeting the EPA's strict regulations and began delivery in the latter half of 2007.

Due to reliability issues, Fortescue units 910 to 917 were stored. They were purchased to be used as slave units, and were more offline than they were in use. All were scrapped in 2022. As at October 2024, six SD90MAC-Hs remained in service with two in store.

On 1 August 2008, Union Pacific announced that it would be retiring 21 of the SD90MAC locomotives. Common parts will be used to maintain the railroad's 710-engined SD90MAC fleet. The 265H prime mover will be cut up or exported. The only part that is not reusable is the frame. These units, in the 8900 series will be removed from storage in Denver, and will be sent to East St. Louis, in small batches to be dismantled. As of 2019, Union Pacific still operates some of the remaining SD9043MACs, which sport new numbers and UP wings on the cab. These units take the original road numbers of the Union Pacific's original SD40-2 fleet.

Canadian Pacific's SD90MAC-H locomotives 9300-9303 (listed as SD90MAC6000s) were up for tendered sale in 2009. The bidding ended 31 March 2010. While they were originally thought to be shipped overseas, they were eventually moved to Quebec for scrapping.

Canadian Pacific's SD90MAC locomotives, numbered in the 9100–9160 series had been in long-term storage in Winnipeg, Manitoba, for much of the 2010 decade. Three units, the 9129, 9133 and 9138, were scrapped in November 2012 due to errors in preparing them for long-term storage. The entire fleet had been put up for sale in November 2012 and again in January 2013 with no offers being received. These units remained stored until the winter of 2018 when at first 30, then all 58 remaining units entered a rebuild program to be converted into SD70ACUs. In 2021, Canadian Pacific purchased 40 more SD90MACs from the Union Pacific for further rebuilding into SD70ACU engines.

In September 2014, Norfolk Southern purchased 100 4300 hp SD9043MACs from Union Pacific with the intent to rebuild them into SD70ACUs at the Juniata Shops. The last four SD90MACs were delivered to Norfolk Southern on October 3, 2015, running parallel to Western Avenue in Chicago.

In 2015, Cummins rebuilt a single SD90MAC with its QSK95 engine, designed to meet Tier 4 emissions standards. Sygnet Rail Technologies and Brookville Equipment Corporation performed the conversion. The rebuild was designated HTL4200AC. The locomotive, numbered CECX No. 1919, had been Union Pacific No. 8559.

== Preservation ==
- Union Pacific No. 3568 (built in April 1997 as UP No. 8138) was acquired by the Midwest Overland Rail Preservation Society on October 25th, 2026. It is the very first SD90MAC/SD9043MAC to be preserved.

== See also ==
- GE AC6000CW A similarly powerful locomotive built by GE that entered production soon after the SD90MAC.
- China Railways HXN3
