= EMD SD80MAC =

Model of diesel-electric locomotive built by EMD

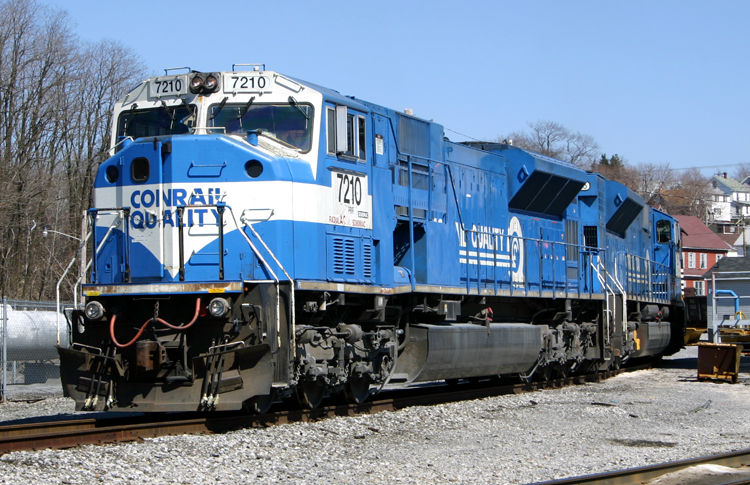
- A pair of Norfolk Southern EMD SD80MACs with no. 7210 leading before repainting by Norfolk Southern; originally built as Conrail no. 4118
Type and origin
- Power type: Diesel-electric
- Builder: General Motors Electro-Motive Division (EMD)
- Model: SD80MAC, SD80ACe, GT50AC
- Build date: SD80MAC: 1995–1996; SD80ACe: 2011–2012; GT50AC: 2012-2018
- Total produced: SD80MAC: 30; SD80ACe: 7 GT50AC: 7
Specifications
- Configuration
  - AAR: C-C
  - UIC: Co′Co′
- Gauge: 4 ft 8 1/2 in (1,435 mm) standard gauge
- Trucks: EMD HTCR II
- Wheel diameter: 45 in (1,143 mm)
- Length: 80MAC: 80 ft 2 in (24.43 m); 80ACe: 76 ft 6 in (23.32 m)
- Height: 80MAC: 15 ft 5 in (4.70 m); 80ACe: 15 ft 10 in (4.83 m)
- Loco weight: 80MAC: 420,000 lb (191,000 kg); SD80ACe: 432,500 lb (196,000 kg)
- Fuel capacity: SD80MAC: 5,800 US gal (22,000 L; 4,800 imp gal); SD80ACe: 4,900 US gal (19,000 L; 4,100 imp gal); GT50AC: 1,981 US gal (7,500 L; 1,650 imp gal)
- Prime mover: SD80MAC: EMD 20-710G3B-ES; SD80Ace: 20-710G3C-ES; GT50AC: 20N-710G3B-EC
- Engine type: V20 diesel
- Alternator: Electro-Motive Diesel TA22-CA8A
- Traction motors: 6 Siemens 1TB2830 AC motors mounted 3 each on 2 HTCR-2 Radial Self Steering trucks
- Cylinders: 20
- Transmission: diesel electric
Performance figures
- Maximum speed: 75 mph (121 km/h)
- Power output: 80MAC: 5,000 hp (3.7 MW); 80ACe: 5,300 hp (4.0 MW)
- Tractive effort: SD80MAC: 185,000 lbf (822.92 kN) starting, 147,000 lbf (653.89 kN) continuous 80ACe: 191,000 lbf (849.61 kN) starting GT50AC: 125,893 lbf (560.00 kN) starting, 91,047 lbf (405.00 kN) continuous
Career
- Operators: SD80MAC (Only Former Operators): Conrail, Norfolk Southern and CSX; SD80ACe: Vale Mining and Progress Rail; GT50AC: Indian Railways
- Class: CSX 800–812, renumbered to 4590–4602; NS 7200–7228; Vale 101-107; Indian Railways 50001-50007
- Nicknames: Conrail Cadillacs
- Disposition: VALE and Indian units in service, six NS units stored, remainder scrapped.

The EMD SD80MAC was a 5,000 horsepower (3.7 MW) C-C diesel-electric locomotive first produced in 1995 and in service until February 2020. It was powered by a 20-cylinder version of EMD's 710G prime mover, and was the second diesel locomotive by GM-EMD to use a V20 engine, since EMD's SD45 series. It introduced a wide radiator housing similar to GE Transportation locomotives and the placement of dynamic brakes at the rear of the locomotive, which is a quieter location, features that were incorporated into the SD90MAC and SD70ACe models. Key spotting differences between the SD80MAC and SD90MAC include no external rear sandbox on the SD90MAC, no rear lighted number boards on the SD90MAC, and the placement of the front number boards (above the cab windows on the SD80MAC, on the nose on most SD90MACs). The SD80MAC also had recessed red marker lights in the nose, an identifying feature unique to Conrail (CR) locomotives, although Norfolk Southern (NS) had removed the lights on most of their former Conrail engines.

All 30 SD80MAC units built were delivered to Conrail, and the 28 production units were completed, tested, and painted at the former Pennsylvania Railroad shops in Altoona, Pennsylvania.

Prior to the 1995 merger with Union Pacific, Chicago and North Western Railway placed an order of 15 locomotives. Canadian Pacific placed an order as well but it was changed to SD90MACs. Conrail planned a second order of SD80MACs, but its new owners changed the order to SD70s and SD70MACs, all of which would be built at the Juniata Shops in Altoona.

Vale Mining of Brazil ordered a set of seven updated locomotives designated as the SD80ACe model. These locomotives feature Tier 1 compliant 20-710G3C-ES engines, with 5,300 hp (4.0 MW) at 950 RPM. The design is currently for export only, and these specific locomotives will run on Vale Mining's 5 ft 3 in (1,600 mm) broad gauge trackage.

Another broad gauge variant introduced in 2012 is the EMD GT50AC, also known as the Indian locomotive class WDG-5, a smaller and lighter 135-ton variant, with an up-tweaked EMD 20N-710G3B-EC engine, capable of producing 5,500 hp (4.1 MW) at 910 RPM, to serve the Indian Railways, whose current tracks are weak to handle very heavy locomotives, just like how EMD GT46MAC (a) WDG-4 was developed from SD70MAC by reducing the weight. The seven locomotives of the class were developed indigenously by Banaras Locomotive Works (BLW) of India. The locomotives are not a part of the SD80 series, but are completely based on it, making it the second International application of the V20-710 prime mover, after the Brazilian SD80ACe.

After the split of Conrail in 1999, the SD80MACs were split up between Norfolk Southern Railway and CSX Transportation. Norfolk Southern received 17 units (numbered 7200–7216) while CSX got 13 (800–812, renumbered starting in 2007 to 4590–4602). The former Conrail units were the first AC traction locomotives owned by Norfolk Southern, with the railroad not ordering more until late 2008 with an order of General Electric's ES44AC. In late 2014, Norfolk Southern announced that they had reached an agreement with CSX Transportation to trade 12 EMD SD40-2 units (NS 3425–3447) for CSX's remaining 12 SD80MACs (one unit being scrapped after an accident), leaving NS as the model's sole operator. They were delivered to the NS in April 2015.

In February 2020, following the beginning of COVID-19 pandemic, Norfolk Southern retired all 29 of its remaining SD80MACs, owing to their operational costs. Six units were sold to Canadian Pacific Kansas City (then Canadian Pacific Railway) as parts sources for their recent EMD SD70ACU rebuilds. The remainder of the NS fleet went to Progress Rail and were scrapped. As of January 2022, the Conrail Historical Society was in contact with Canadian Pacific Kansas City Limited hoping to have one SD80MAC set aside for preservation, after failing to make an agreement with Progress Rail. As of 2025, the six SD80MACs still remain in storage as the remainder were scrapped.

== Incidents ==
On January 31, 2005, CSX 808, built as CR 4121 received damage after a broken rail caused the train to derail and drive into a ditch on the Popes Creek Secondary. CSX 809, built as CR 4122 also derailed but with very little damage, with CSX 806, built as CR 4113 receiving absolutely no damage.

CSX 4594, formerly CSX 804, and built as CR 4110, was scrapped in January 2014 after being used as a parts donor following a derailment in early 2009.

A Norfolk Southern South Fork crew was securing their engines for the night on 18 November 2016, when an electrical fire broke out in the cab of NS 7210 (built as CR 4118). There were no injuries, but the SD80MAC's cab interior was completely destroyed. The unit was hauled to the Juniata Shops in Altoona where it was stored in the deadline until it was among the units that were sold off to Progress Rail. The unit was scrapped in December 2021.
