= China Railways HXN5 =

Chinese diesel-electric locomotive class

HXN5 ES59ACi 和谐内5
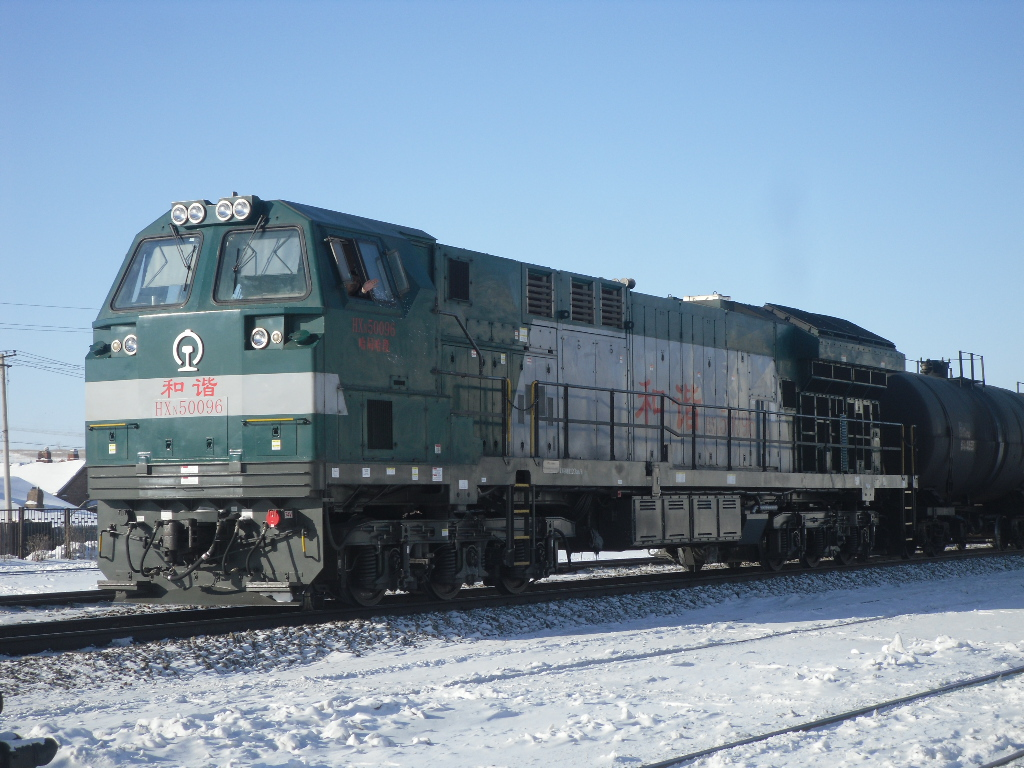
- HXN5-0096
Type and origin
- Power type: Diesel-electric
- Builder: General Electric, CSR, CRRC Qishuyan
- Model: ES59ACi
- Build date: 2008–2010
- Total produced: 300
Specifications
- Configuration
  - UIC: Co′Co′
- Gauge: 1,435 mm (4 ft 8 1/2 in)
- Length: 22,295 mm (73 ft 1.8 in)
- Width: 3,119 mm (10 ft 2.80 in)
- Height: 4,775 mm (15 ft 7.99 in)
- Axle load: 25 t (24.6 long tons; 27.6 short tons)
- Loco weight: 150 t (148 long tons; 165 short tons)
- Prime mover: GEVO16
- Displacement: 251.33 L (15,337 cu in)
- Cylinders: V16
- Cylinder size: 250 mm × 320 mm (9.843 in × 12.598 in) bore x stroke
- Transmission: Electric （AC—DC—AC）
- Loco brake: Straight air and dynamic
Performance figures
- Maximum speed: 120 km/h (75 mph)
- Power output: 6,250 hp (4,660 kW); 5,572 hp (4,155 kW) @ wheel
- Tractive effort: 620 kN (140,000 lb_{f}) (starting); 565 kN (127,000 lb_{f}) @ 22.3 km/h (14 mph) (continuous)
Career
- Locale: China

The GE ES59ACi, also known as the HXN5 (Chinese: 和谐内5) or China Mainline Locomotive, is a type of diesel-electric locomotive built by GE Transportation and CRRC Qishuyan for use on freight trains from Harbin to Qiqihar and Mudanjiang in China.

In October 2005, China Railway ordered 700 ES59ACi Evolution Series locomotives from GE Transportation and CRRC Qishuyan for delivery in 2008–2009. Two have been built at Erie, Pennsylvania, in 2008; the rest were assembled by Qishuyan at Changzhou in 2008–2010. The first Chinese made loco was unveiled on 25 November 2008. The initial order was reduced from 700 to an actual 300 units produced.

The locomotive is equipped with a GE GEVO-16 engine, with an output of 6,250 horsepower (4,660 kW).

== Gallery ==
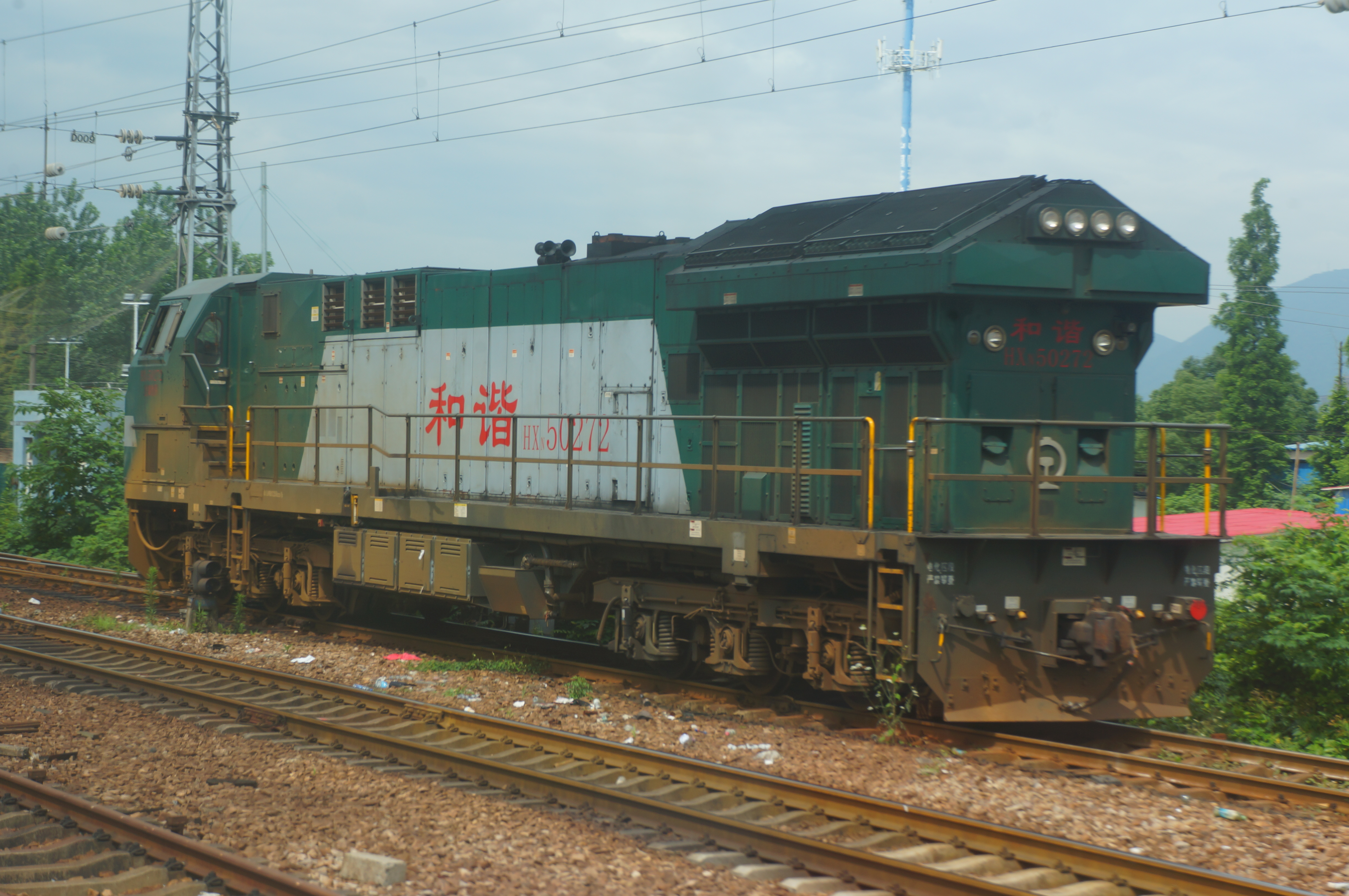
HXN5-0272 at Qiaosi Railway Station

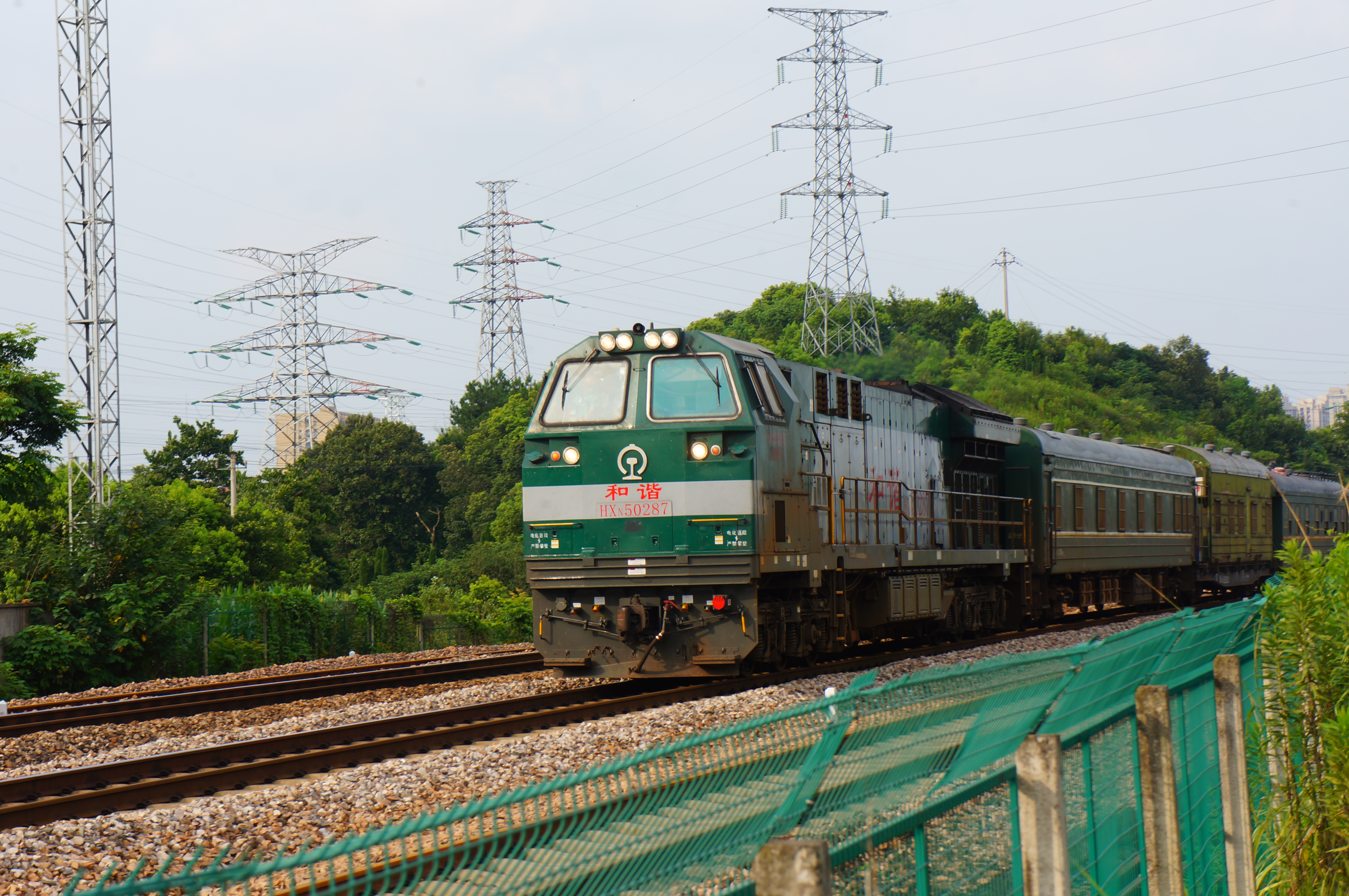
HXN5-0287 at Xingqiao Railway Station

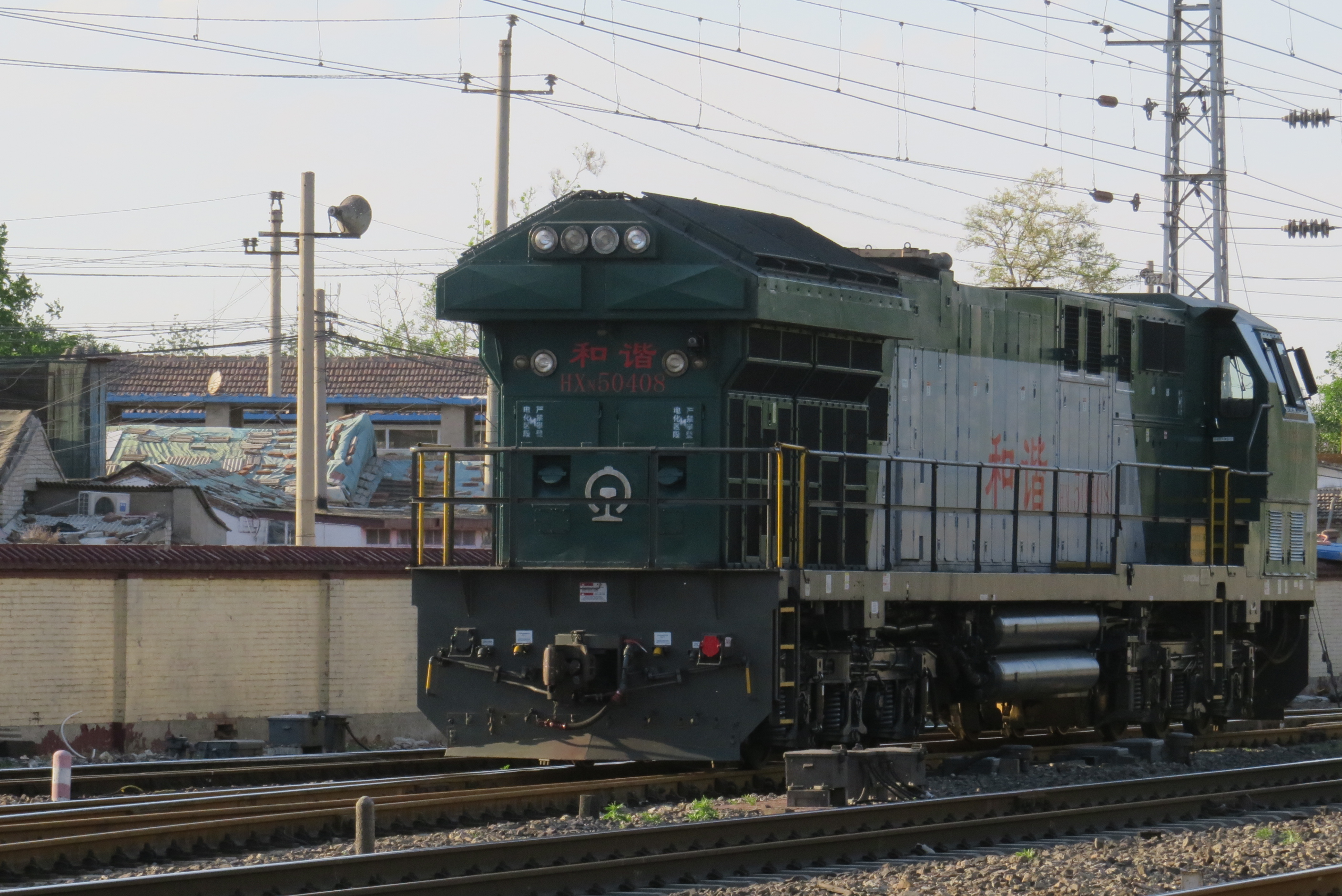
HXN5-0408 at Fengtai South Signal Base

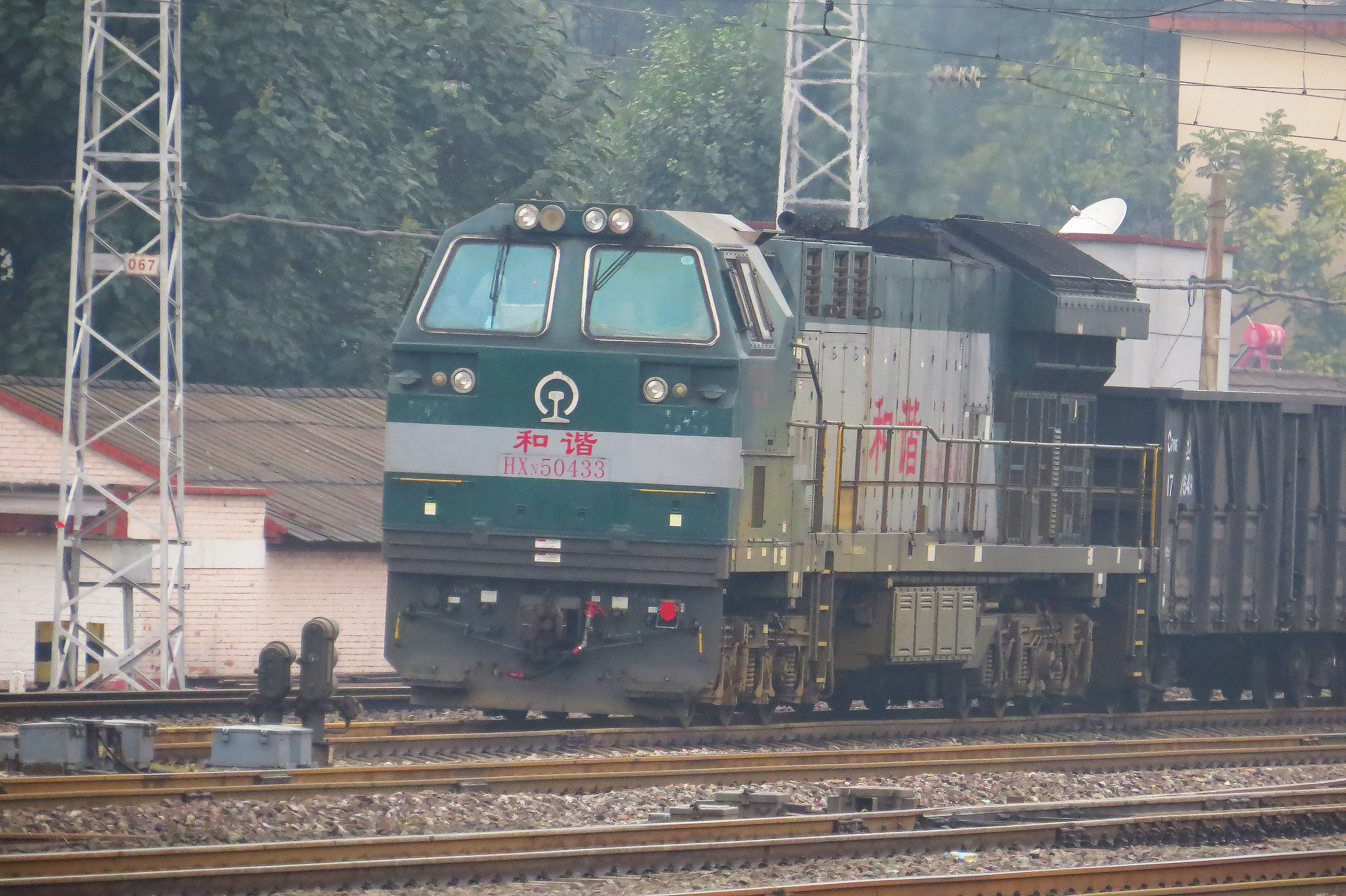
HXN5-0433 at Shijingshan South Railway Station

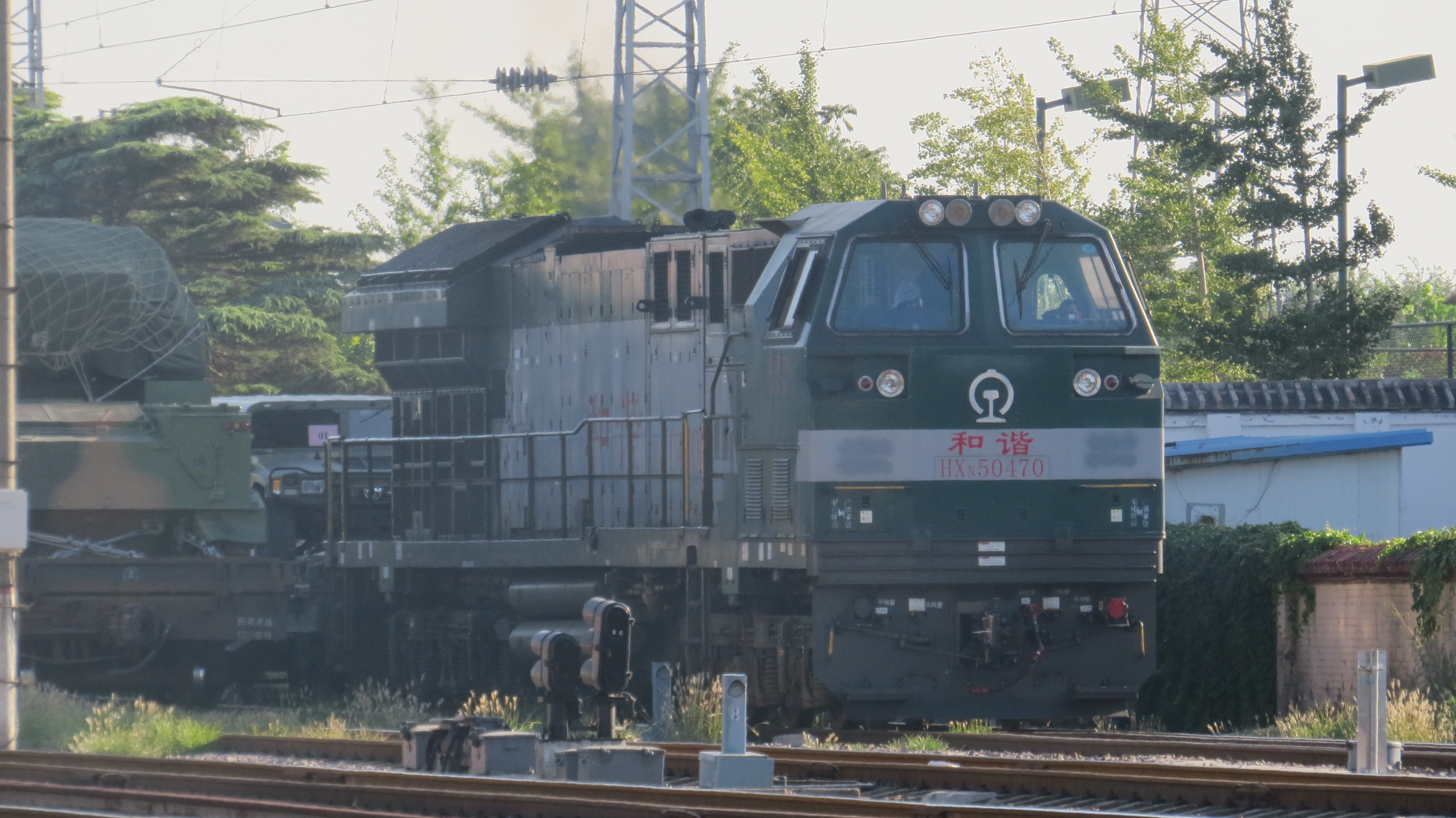
HXN5-0470 at Fengtai South Signal Base

== See also ==
- C38Emi - variant of GE Dash 9-44CW operating in Brazil
- GE C36-7 - operated by CR as ND5 locomotives
- China Railways NJ2
- China Railways HXN3
- China Railways HXN5B
