= Power assembly =

The term power assembly refers to an Electro-Motive Diesel (EMD) engine sub-assembly designed to be "easily" removed and replaced in order to restore engine performance lost to wear or engine failure. Typical of heavy-duty internal combustion engines used in industrial applications, EMD engines are designed to allow the cylinder liners, pistons, piston rings and connecting rods to be replaced at overhaul without removing the entire engine assembly from its application location. This increases engine value, reduces downtime and allows the engine to be returned to true new engine performance. Other terms such as cylinder pack, liner pack, cylinder assembly and cylinder kit are used in the engine industry to describe similar assemblies. In the large-engine industry, the term "power assembly" has also become generic and is often used to refer to the assemblies used in non-EMD engines where "power pack" may be the preferred term, although both terms are functionally the same.

Because of the size and weight of the engine assembly and the difficulties of removing and transporting them for repair, they are typically serviced on-site in stationary applications and in the ship or locomotive in transportation applications. Designing the engine for "easy" service is done out of necessity rather than the desire to increase engine serviceability. Power assemblies are large and heavy and overhead lifting equipment sufficient to lift the fixture and assembly are required.

An EMD power assembly consists of the following components:

1. Cylinder head assembly (including valves, springs, keepers etc.) less fuel system components
2. Cylinder liner
3. Piston and piston rings
4. Piston carrier
5. Connecting rod

In an EMD diesel engine, since two power assemblies share a common connecting-rod journal, and since the power assemblies are directly opposite each other rather than staggered as in a typical V-type engine, two different power assemblies are required in a single engine. The difference between the two assemblies is in the connecting rods. One connecting rod "big end" has to fit inside that of its companion rod and the two types are referred to as "blade rods" and "fork rods". The "fork rod" is logically the "master" as only it has a "rod cap", in this specific case referred to as a "basket", whereas the "blade rod" is logically the "slave" as its "big toe" is designed to fit completely within, and is guided by, and is retained by the "fork", and both are retained by the single "basket".

Several situations can require power assembly replacement. Most are due to failure within the power assembly itself such as a dropped valve, broken piston or internal coolant leak. Less common are replacements to repair catastrophic failures such as broken connecting rods or a "hydro-locked" power assembly that has been broken or knocked out of the cylinder block when the cylinder filled with coolant during engine operation and the inability of the piston to compress the liquid caused catastrophic failure. Complete power assembly replacements, where all of the assemblies in an engine are replaced, are least common and are normally done as part of a comprehensive engine overhaul.

In a normal in-service power assembly replacement situation, the replacement will follow an inspection of the engine specifically performed to find internal engine failures. With the engine crankcase access and cylinder block airbox covers removed, a visual inspection of the engine's rotating and reciprocating assemblies can be performed. The use of a fiber optic endoscope (flexible borescope) may facilitate this inspection and evaluation, but this is not a requirement, nor is it a part of EMD's maintenance program.

The engine airbox covers (the upper covers observed on the side of an EMD engine - they cover the "airbox" that allows air to flow through the cylinder block to the power assemblies) are removed to allow visual inspection of the inside of the cylinder liners and the piston crowns, skirts and rings. The crankcase access covers (the lower covers observed on the side of an EMD engine) are also removed to inspect for coolant leakage, damaged components and excessive wear. A proper inspection requires filling and pressurizing the cooling system to check for leakage from the power assemblies.

To inspect the engine, it can be manually "barred over" with a lever, but manual engine rotation is slow and inefficient. In some applications manually barring the engine over can be difficult or impossible. The preferred tool for engine rotation is an electrically powered, hydraulically operated "turning jack". The turning jack uses a hydraulic cylinder and ram assembly that automatically advances to engage a hole in the flywheel. When the ram reaches its limit, it automatically retracts and advances again to engage another hole. The engine is then progressively rotated through its cycle and can be rotated in either direction by installing the jack on either side of the engine. Not only is a turning jack faster and more efficient, it is also safer since there is no risk of a barring lever coming loose and causing injury or damage. Also, with a turning jack, there is no need for the mechanic to be in physical contact with the engine at any point during the inspection process.

A turning jack also allows a complete top deck and crankcase inspection to be performed by one mechanic in minutes, and inspecting the engine with the components in motion produces a better inspection. Rocker arm rollers can be inspected for proper rotation, potential valvetrain problems such as insufficient or excessive clearance can be observed, piston ring movement in the ring grooves indicating excessive groove wear can be observed, broken valvesprings can be more easily seen, and so on. A turning jack also allows the mechanic to observe the flywheel timing marks while the engine is rotating to time the engine properly for maintenance or post-repair engine valve-train and fuel-system adjustments.

Claims of power assembly replacement being possible with "ordinary tools" in a "few hours" are subjective, as the tools necessary are hardly "ordinary" in typical mechanic shops and actual repair times can vary widely depending on the situation. At the minimum, large sockets and high-capacity torque multipliers are necessary to enable the large nuts retaining the hold-downs to be removed and retorqued to proper specifications. Various other special tools, while not strictly required, make the job much easier. Additionally, there are special tools required for adjustment of the fuel system after assembly replacement.

As far as repair time goes, power assembly replacement is typically performed by at least two mechanics so the labor involved is at least twice the repair time required. If the engine comes in for inspection or repair "hot", the unit may need to cool for several hours before repairs can begin. If parts are not readily available, the delays will increase. Typically, for a power assembly replacement in an engine cool enough to work on and with the proper tools and necessary parts readily at hand, two mechanics can replace a power assembly properly and safely in a 4-hour period. Rarely are major repairs involving expensive engines and components and significant safety hazards rushed to create "efficiency" at the expense of safety and reliability.

The quality and layout of the work area also has a big effect on the time required and the quality of the work. Proper equipment and tools make the job "easy". Poor working conditions and having to make do without the appropriate tools and equipment can make the replacement process a nightmare. The aforementioned "barring over" with a lever versus having a turning jack is a good example of being properly equipped. A properly equipped repair shop for mobile equipment (locomotives) or individual engines (rebuild/overhaul shop) or the area where stationary engines are permanently installed (marine applications where the engine cannot be practically removed for service or electrical power plants, etc.) will be equipped with sufficient overhead lifting equipment to allow the assemblies to be safely and efficiently handled, removed and installed.

Although the components are large and heavy and specialized tools are required, the replacement process is straightforward and simple. The engine coolant is drained, the test valve "snifter" is removed, the rocker arm assembly and fuel system components are removed, the connecting rod is disconnected from the crankshaft, the power assembly hold-downs (commonly called "crabs") are removed, the cooling system plumbing is disconnected, piston cooling tube is removed, the lifting fixture is installed and the power assembly is lifted out of the cylinder block. The process is reversed to install the replacement power assembly.

Following installation of the replacement assembly, all hardware is torqued to specs, the cooling system is refilled, the engine crankshaft is properly timed to allow the valves and fuel injector of the new power assembly to be adjusted, the valve train and fuel injection system is adjusted using appropriate gauges, the fuel system is primed and the engine is started and checked for proper operation and leaks within the cooling system, if any, are identified. As in any other situation where an engine is rebuilt, there is a "break-in" period for replacement power assemblies that should include operating the engine at varying speeds and loads for a specified period of time to seat the cylinder rings before the engine is placed into normal service.
