= Electro-Motive Diesel =

American locomotive manufacturer

- Formerly: Electro-Motive Engineering Corporation (1922); Electro-Motive Company (1922–30); Electro-Motive Corporation (1930–1940); Electro-Motive Division (1941–2004)
- Type: Subsidiary
- Industry: Transport
- Founded: August 31, 1922; 104 years ago, in Cleveland, Ohio, United States
- Founder: Harold L. Hamilton; Paul Turner
- Headquarters: La Grange, Illinois, (Note: The plant and headquarters, officially in "La Grange, Illinois," are actually situated in McCook, Illinois, a suburb of Chicago, but use a postal address in La Grange.) United States
- Products: Locomotives
- Number of employees: 3,260 (2008)
- Parent: Progress Rail (2010–present); Berkshire Partners (2005–2010); General Motors (1930–2005)

Electro-Motive Diesel (abbreviated EMD) is a brand of diesel-electric locomotives, locomotive products and diesel engines for the rail industry. Formerly a division of General Motors, EMD has been owned by Progress Rail since 2010.

Electro-Motive Diesel traces its roots to the Electro-Motive Engineering Corporation, founded in 1922 and purchased by General Motors in 1930. After purchase by GM, the company was known as GM's Electro-Motive Division. In 2005, GM sold EMD to Greenbriar Equity Group and Berkshire Partners and, in 2010, EMD was sold to Progress Rail, a subsidiary of the heavy equipment manufacturer Caterpillar. After the 2005 sale, the company was renamed to Electro-Motive Diesel.

EMD's headquarters and engineering facilities are based in McCook, Illinois, while its final locomotive assembly line is located in Muncie, Indiana. EMD also operates a traction motor maintenance, rebuild, and overhaul facility in San Luis Potosí, Mexico.

As of 2008, EMD employed approximately 3,260 people, and in 2010 it held approximately 30% of the market for diesel-electric locomotives in North America. Its principal competitor is Wabtec-owned GE Transportation, which held up to 70% of the North American market in 2007.

== History ==
=== 1920s: Foundation ===
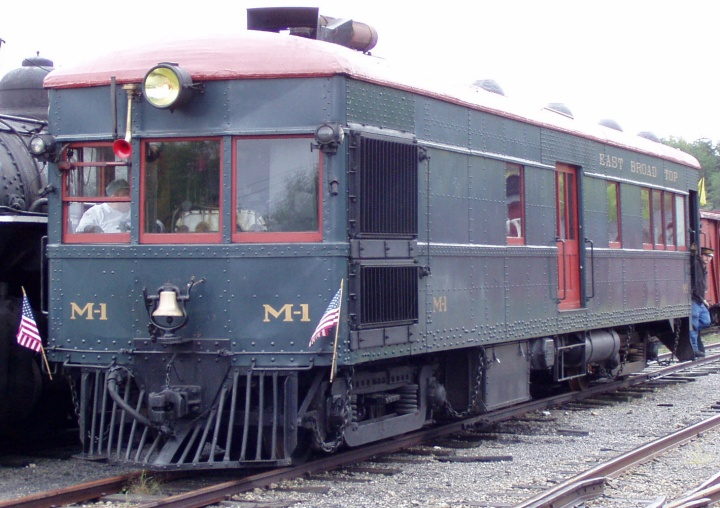
1920s gasoline-electric railcar

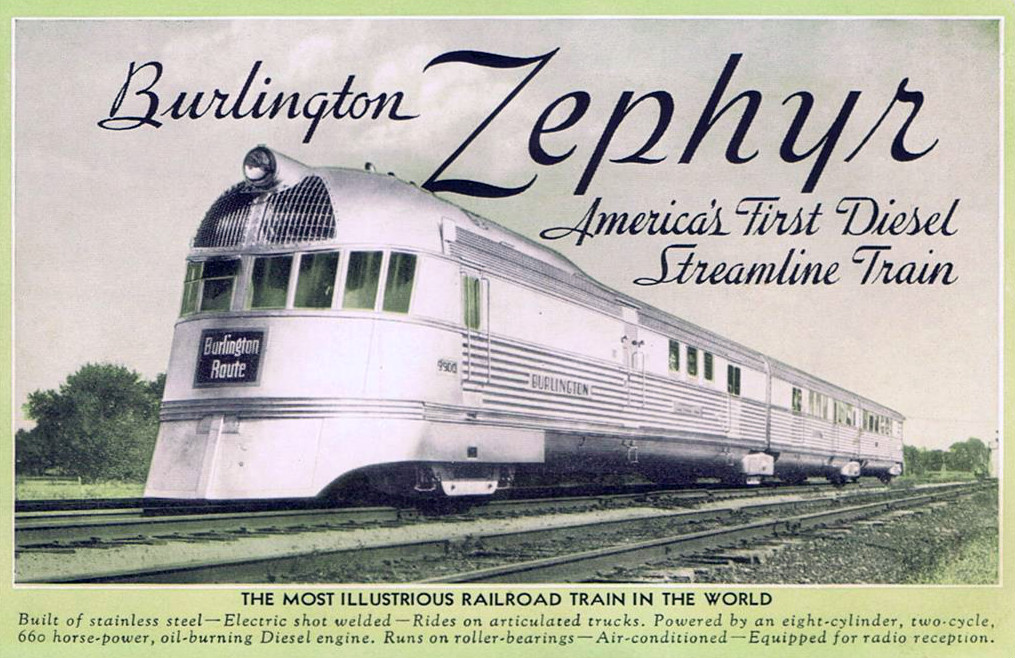
Burlington Zephyr, powered by EMC diesel-electric drive

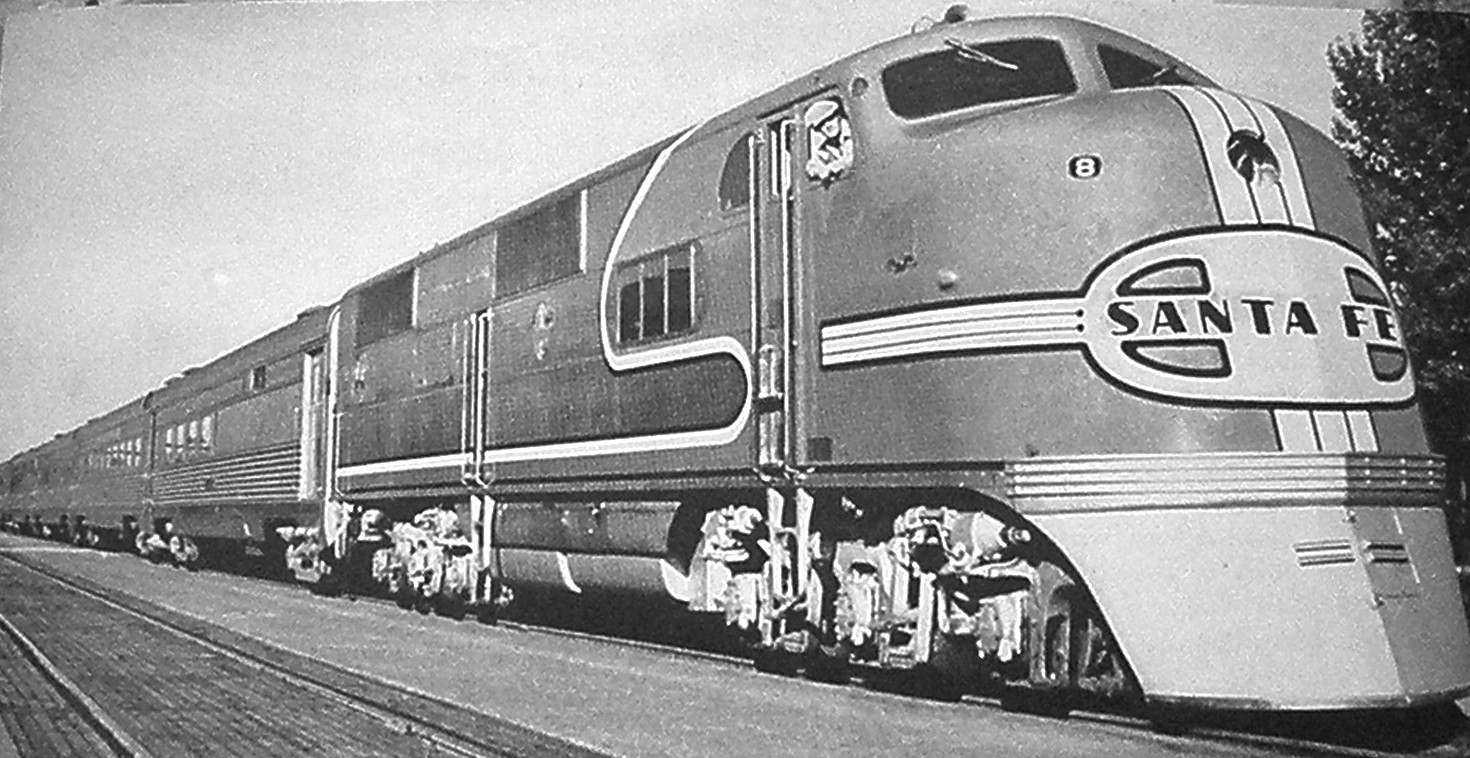
EMC E1, one of EMC's earliest standard production model locomotives

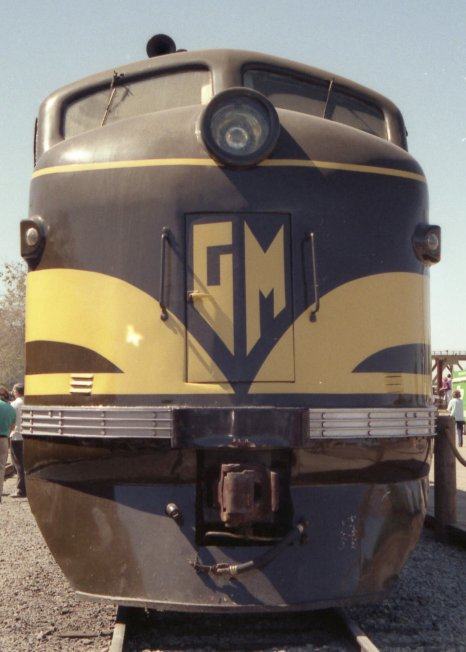
FT demonstrator unit EMD 103 at the California State Railroad Museum in 1991

Harold L. Hamilton and Paul Turner founded the Electro-Motive Engineering Corporation in Cleveland, Ohio, in 1922, soon renaming it to Electro-Motive Company (EMC). The company developed and marketed self-propelled railcars using General Electric's newly developed internal combustion-electric propulsion and control systems.

Hamilton had started his railroading career as a fireman, then locomotive engineer, on the Southern Pacific Railroad. He became a manager with the Florida East Coast Railway before he left railroading for a marketing position with the White Motor Company in Denver, an early manufacturer of trucks and buses. Training and service agreements were part of White's marketing package that Hamilton would carry over to EMC. Aware of the needs of railroad branch line services, and the opportunities provided with GE's new internal combustion-electric propulsion and control technology, he quit his position with White and set up shop in a Chicago hotel with his partner and a designer, to develop and market a new generation of self-propelled railcars.

In 1923, EMC sold two gasoline-powered rail motor cars, one to the Chicago Great Western and the other to the Northern Pacific. EMC subcontracted the body construction to St Louis Car Company, electrical components to General Electric, and the prime mover to the Winton Engine Company of Cleveland, Ohio. The railcars were delivered in 1924 and worked well, fortunately for the fledgling company, because the sales were conditional on satisfactory performance. In 1925, EMC entered full-scale production, selling 27 railcars.

=== The General Motors years ===
==== 1930s ====
In 1930, General Motors (GM) was seeking to enter production of diesel engines and broaden their range of applications. They purchased the Winton Engine Company, who had in their product line a variety of stationary and marine diesel engines and spark-ignition engines for heavy vehicles. GM saw EMC's role in developing and marketing Winton-engined heavy vehicles as fitting their objectives and purchased the company shortly after the Winton acquisition, renaming it Electro-Motive Corporation (EMC), a subsidiary of GM. Supported by the GM Research Division headed by Charles F. Kettering, GM's Winton Engine Corporation focused on developing diesel engines with improved power-to-weight ratios and output flexibility suitable for mobile use. Eugene W. Kettering, son of Charles Kettering, led Winton's side of the development project.

In 1933, EMC designed the power setups for the Zephyr and M-10000 streamliners, a breakthrough in the power and speed available with their propulsion systems. The Zephyr used the first major product of the new GM-Winton venture, a 600 hp, eight cylinder version of the Winton 201A Roots blown, uniflow scavenged, unit injected, 2-stroke diesel engine. As the Budd and Pullman Standard companies entered contracts to build more diesel-powered streamliners, they became major customers for EMC. Diesel power had been shown suitable for small, lightweight, high speed trains, in addition to its more established role in yard service.

Seeing opportunities to broaden the role of diesel in railroading, EMC invested in a new locomotive factory and started development work on the locomotives that it would produce. The factory headquarters on 55th Street in McCook, Illinois, west of Chicago, remains the corporate headquarters. The 1935 EMC 1800 hp B-B development design locomotives featured the multiple-unit control systems that became the basis of cab/booster locomotive sets, and the twin engine format that would be adopted for the newest Zephyr power units in 1936 and EMC's E series streamlined passenger locomotives that their new factory began producing in 1937. Prior to their introduction of the E units EMC was in production of switch engines, which remained the mainstay of their production until dieselization of freight and passenger service hit full stride in the mid-1940s.

The GM-Winton research and development effort continued through the mid-1930s, building on experience with the Winton 201A, to develop diesel engines to better meet the specific needs of locomotive use. The fruit of that effort was GM's new 567 engine, introduced by their renamed Cleveland Diesel Engine Division in 1938. The new engine upgraded the horsepower of EMC's E series locomotives to 2000 per locomotive unit and increased reliability substantially. Also in 1938, EMC increased its reach up the chain of locomotive production by transitioning from General Electric equipment to in-house produced generators and traction motors. With Eugene Kettering moving to EMC that year, EMC moved into a leading role in further development of GM's locomotive engines.

GM-Winton-EMC's long development efforts put the company in an advantageous position relative to other developers of diesel-electric locomotion. Their nearest competitor was the American Locomotive Company (ALCO), who had produced diesel-electric switch engines since the mid-1920s, provided motive power for the Rebel streamliner trainsets in 1935, and started production of development design locomotives to compete with the E-units in 1939. EMC's other main competitor, the Baldwin Locomotive Works, had their development work with diesel delayed by their belief through the 1930s that the future of mainline service remained with steam, and by financial difficulties that effectively froze their diesel development while EMC and ALCO continued theirs. Baldwin started producing diesel-electric switch engines in 1939.

Passenger trains made little money for the railroads, but replacement of steam engines with reliable diesel units could provide railroads with a crucial difference for profitability. With standardized production of locomotives, EMC simplified the processes for ordering, manufacturing, and servicing locomotives and introduced economies of scale that would lower unit costs. EMC offered support services including financing, training, and field maintenance that would ease the transition from steam to diesel and boost their market in the last years before US entry into World War II. The performance of the new 567 engine in passenger locomotives also built confidence in the viability of diesel power for freight service.

In 1939, the company built a four-unit freight locomotive demonstrator, the FT, and began a tour of the continent's railroads. The tour was a success. Western railroads in particular saw that the diesels could free them from dependence on scarce water supplies for steam locomotives. In 1940, after incorporating dynamic braking at the suggestion of customers, they were receiving their first orders for the new freight locomotive.

==== 1940s ====
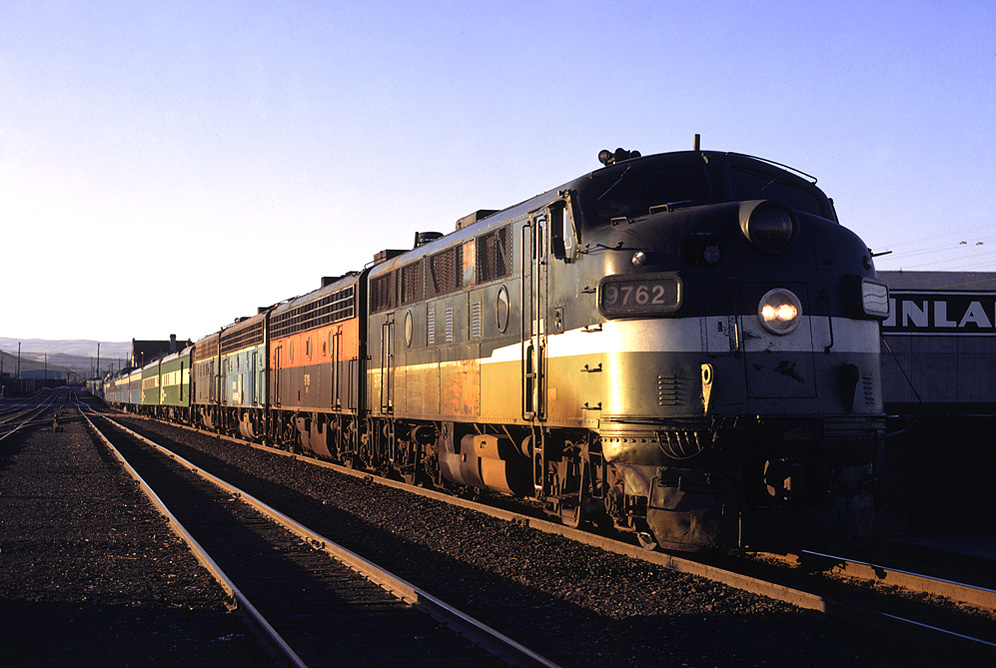
Burlington Northern EMD F3 in service for Amtrak in 1971, leading the North Coast Hiawatha.

General Motors moved production of locomotive engines under the authority of EMC to create the GM Electro-Motive Division (EMD) on January 1, 1941. With that move, EMD became a fully self-contained development, production, marketing, and service entity. Nonlocomotive products (large marine and stationary diesel engines) continued under GM's Cleveland Diesel Engine Division for another twenty years.

In January 1941 EMD delivered the first FT unit to the Atchison, Topeka & Santa Fe Railway, numbered Unit 100, and through that year they were in full-stride production of road and switch locomotives, becoming the world's biggest producer. America's entry into World War II temporarily slowed EMD's locomotive production; United States Navy ships gained priority for diesel power and the petroleum crisis of 1942–43 made coal-fired steam a more attractive option. The War Production Board stopped production of new passenger equipment between September 1942 and December 1944. Later in the war, diesel locomotive production for freight service was picking up as more locomotives were needed to haul wartime supplies. By the time the FT model was replaced in 1945, 555 cab units and 541 booster units had been produced.

EMD emerged from the war years with major advantages over its competitors in diesel locomotive production, having entered them with fully developed lines of mainline road diesel locomotives while war production allocations restricted their competitors, principally ALCO and Baldwin, to selling mainly diesel switchers and steam locomotives of pre-existing designs. That gave an advantage to EMD's state of technical development with higher powered diesels in the critical postwar years. New model passenger locomotives were delivered starting in February 1945. New models of their freight locomotive followed later in 1945 and 1946.

By the late 1940s the vast majority of American railroads had decided to dieselize their locomotive fleets. Passenger services facing increasing competition from air and automotive travel rapidly replaced steam for image and cost reasons, but the biggest growth market was for freight locomotives. To meet post-war demands, EMD opened another locomotive production facility in Cleveland, Ohio, in 1948.

Alco-GE was EMD's strongest competitor during the dieselization era, having produced the first road-switcher diesel locomotives in 1941 and gained about a 26% market share of diesel locomotives, mostly for switching and short-haul applications, as of 1946. ALCO's higher-powered locomotives for mainline service were less successful, as they were plagued by reliability problems. In 1948 the ALCO-GE partnership developed a prototype gas-turbine-electric locomotive; series production began in 1952. Latecomers to the diesel locomotive business Baldwin, Fairbanks-Morse, and Lima-Hamilton struggled in the market as their products failed to gain a solid reputation. In 1949 EMD's new EMD GP7 road switcher locomotive entered the market niche previously held by ALCO and Baldwin, and by 1950 it was clear that EMD's competitors could not break its position in mainline road diesels.

==== 1950s ====
In 1950, EMD's new plant in London, Ontario, Canada, began production. The plant was operated by the Canadian subsidiary General Motors Diesel (GMD), producing existing EMD as well as unique GMD designs for the Canadian domestic and export markets. GMD were, as a Canadian concern, able to sell products to other British Commonwealth nations without the tariffs encumbering trade with non-Commonwealth nations, gaining the same market access as ALCO and Baldwin through their subsidiaries Montreal Locomotive Works and Canadian Locomotive Company.

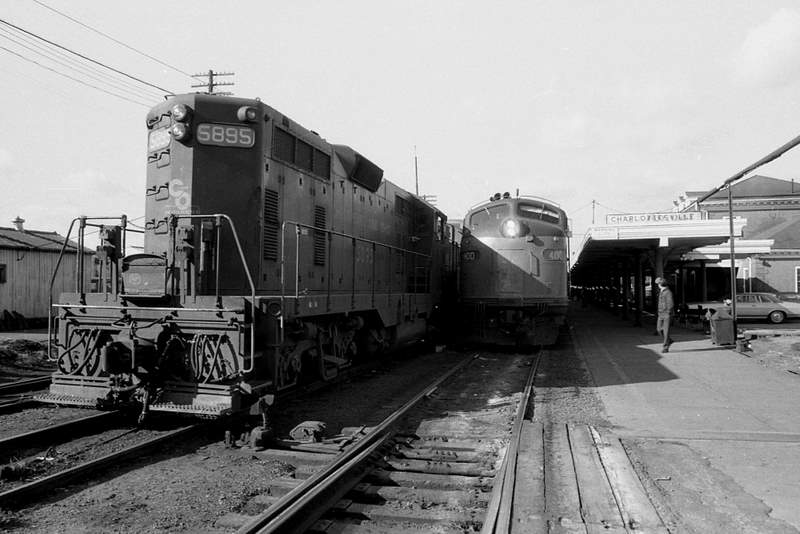
EMD GP7 (left) and E9A (right)

EMD's road-switcher locomotives with power and reliability sufficient for mainline use overturned the market for freight locomotives, soon displacing their competitors' road-switchers, then later their own F-series carbody locomotives. The GP9 became the most-produced EMD model ever, with 4,112 A units and 165 B units sold between 1954 and 1963. Owing to their ease of maintenance and versatility, most locomotives sold in North America since the introduction of the GP9 have been road-switcher, or hood, units. Flush-sided locomotives based on a road-switcher chassis, or cowl units, would later be produced for passenger service.

During the mid-1950s, more difficult market conditions followed the peak demand of the dieselization era. The 1950s saw collapse in the positions of all of EMD's established competitors and the strong emergence of a new one, the General Electric Company. Lima-Hamilton failed first, in 1951 merging with Baldwin to form Baldwin-Lima-Hamilton. Baldwin's own position was precarious, with their market share dwindling until they left the locomotive business in 1956. Fairbanks-Morse, after struggling to maintain a foothold in the industry with their opposed piston marine powerplant, left the locomotive field in 1963. General Electric dissolved the ALCO-GE partnership in the wake of ALCO's lackluster efforts at developing reliable higher-powered engines, and took over the ALCO-GE gas-turbine-electric venture in 1953. In 1956 GE was marketing its own Universal series Cooper-Bessemer powered diesel-electrics as export locomotives. ALCO's belated introduction of improved locomotive power in 1956 provided the company little benefit; they no longer had the marketing, financing, or service support of GE and the GP9 was a formidable competitor in the saturated domestic market. In 1960 the U25B was the first of GE's road locomotives powered by their FDL-16 diesel engine, which would rapidly displace ALCO's position and eventually displace EMD's position in the domestic market. Competition from the two giants with large capital resources overwhelmed ALCO until they went out of business in 1969.

The 567 engine was continuously improved and upgraded. The original six-cylinder 567 produced 600 hp (450 kW), the V-12 1,000 hp (750 kW), and the V-16 1,350 hp (1,010 kW). EMD began turbocharging the 567 around 1958; the final version, the 567D3A (built from October, 1963, to about January, 1966) produced 2,500 hp (1,900 kW) in its V-16 form.

==== 1960s ====
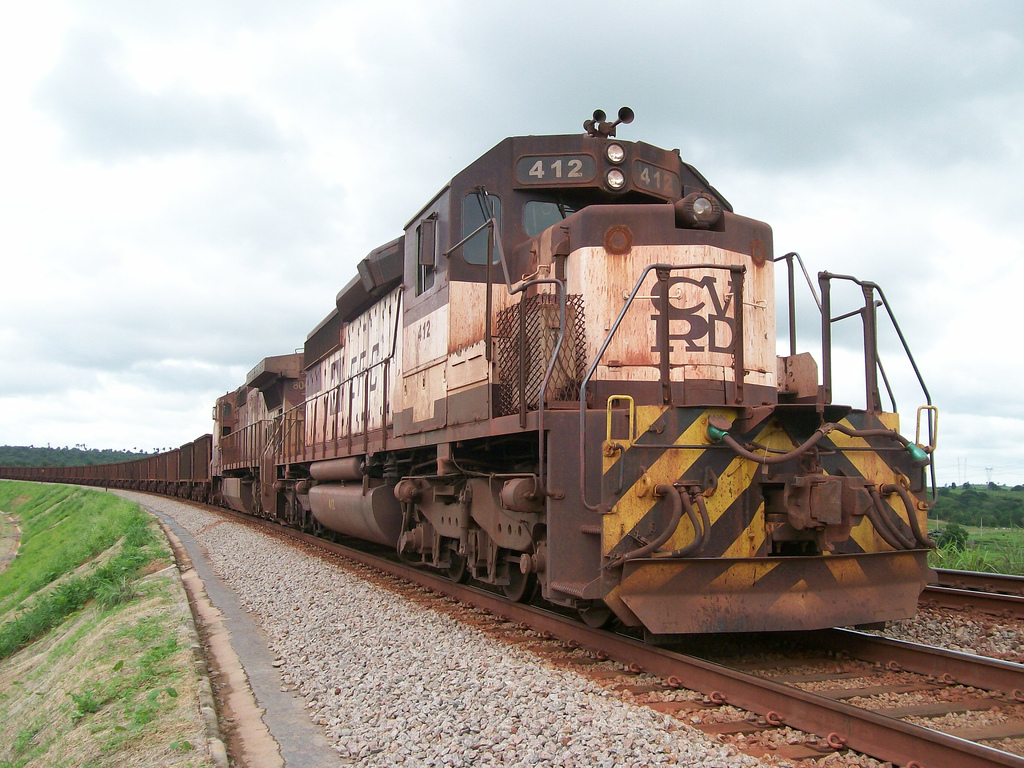
EMD SD40-2

As the 1960s opened EMD was compelled to respond to the challenge offered by GE's U25B, upgrading the features of their GP (General Purpose) and SD (Special Duty/Standard Duty) series locomotives, boosting the power of their 567 engines, then developing the more powerful 645 engines. Those endeavors as well as the feature upgrades introduced with the SD40-2 were sufficient to maintain EMD's competitive advantage over GE until the mid-1980s.

In 1962 GM moved their remaining production of large non-locomotive diesel engines from Cleveland to the EMD facility in McCook, ending the existence of the Cleveland Diesel Engine Division.

In late 1965, EMD introduced the enlarged 645 engine. Power ratings were 1,500 hp (1,100 kW) V-12 nonturbocharged, 1,500 hp (1,100 kW) V-8 turbocharged, 2,300 hp (1,700 kW) V-12 turbocharged, 2,000 hp (1,500 kW) V-16 nonturbocharged, and 3,000 hp (2,200 kW) V-16 turbocharged. In late 1965 EMD built their first twenty-cylinder engine, a turbocharged 3,600 hp (2,700 kW) V20 for the EMD SD45. The final variant of the sixteen cylinder 645 (the 16-645F) produced 3,500 hp (2,600 kW).

==== 1970s ====
In 1972, EMD introduced modular control systems with the Dash-2 line; the EMD SD40-2 became one of the most successful diesel locomotive designs in history, both in terms of sales and service longevity. A total of 3,945 SD40-2 units were built.

==== 1980s ====
EMD introduced their new 710 engine in 1984 with the 60 Series locomotives (EMD SD60 and EMD GP60), the EMD 645 engine continued to be offered in certain models (such as the 50 Series) until 1988. The 710 is produced as an eight-, twelve-, sixteen-, and twenty-cylinder engine for locomotive, marine and stationary applications. Concurrently with the introduction of the 710, EMD's control systems on locomotives changed to microprocessors, with computer-controlled wheel slip prevention, among other systems.

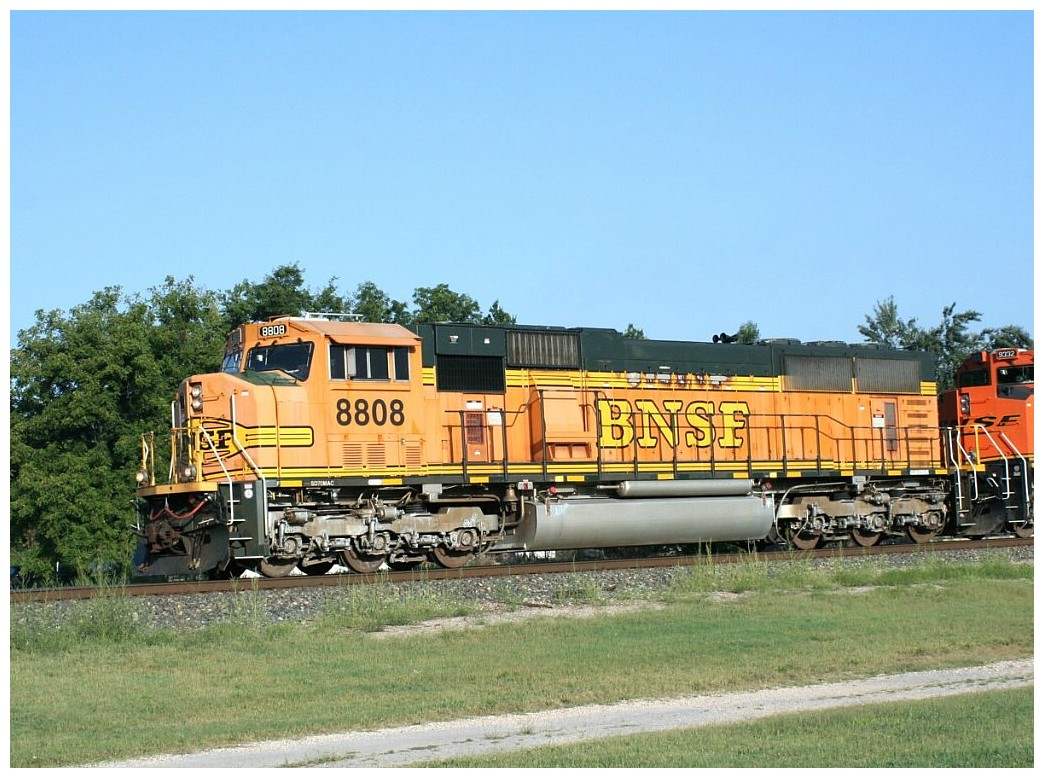
EMD SD70MAC

EMD's North American market share dropped below that of its main competitor General Electric in 1987. After the Canada-United States Free Trade Agreement came into effect in 1989, EMD decided to consolidate all locomotive production at the Diesel Division of General Motors of Canada (formerly GMD) plant in London, Ontario, a development which ended locomotive production at the La Grange, Illinois plant in 1991, although the Illinois facility continued to produce engines and generators.

==== 1990s ====
In the late 1980s and 1990s EMD introduced AC induction motor drive in EMD locomotives using Siemens technology. In the early 1990s, EMD introduced the radial steering truck, which reduced wheel and track wear. In 1995 EMD replaced mechanical unit injectors with electronically controlled unit injectors on its 710 engines.

In 1998 EMD introduced the four-stroke sixteen cylinder 265H-Engine, used as the prime mover in the EMD SD90MAC-H locomotive. Instead of completely replacing the 710 series engine, the H-engine was concurrently produced alongside EMD's two stroke engines, although mainly for export. Acceptance of the 265H was limited over reliability issues. The 265H, at 6,300 hp (4,700 kW), was the most powerful engine ever produced by EMD and the first four-stroke engine offered to the market by EMD or its ancestral companies since the Winton 201A introduced their breakthrough in two-stroke diesel power in 1934.

In 1999, Union Pacific placed the largest single order for diesel locomotives in North American railroad history when they ordered 1,000 units of the EMD SD70M. Union Pacific's fleet of SD70Ms has since been expanded by more than 450 additional units. In addition, Union Pacific also owns nearly 500 EMD SD70ACe locomotives, six of which have been painted in "Fallen Flags" (acquired/merged railroads) commemorative liveries. All of these locomotives are 710G-powered.

=== 2000s: Greenbriar and Berkshire years ===
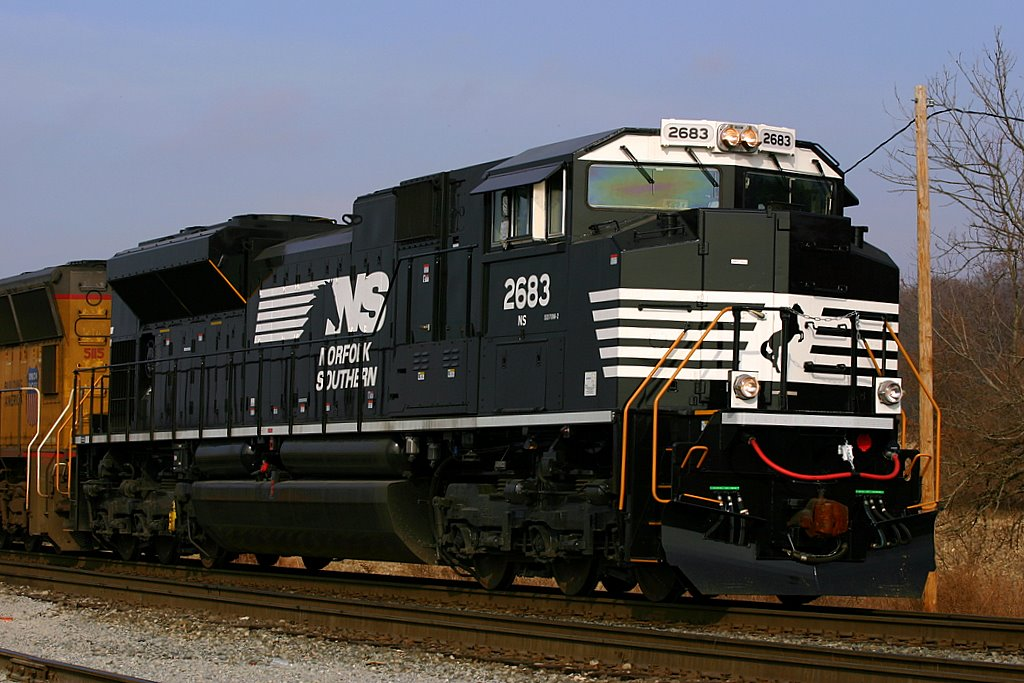
EMD SD70M-2

In 2004, CSX took delivery of the first SD70ACe units, which were advertised by EMD as more reliable, fuel efficient, and easier to maintain than predecessor model SD70MAC. The model meets the EPA Tier 2 emission requirements using the two-stroke 710 diesel engine.

The following year Norfolk Southern became the first carrier to receive the new SD70M-2 - successor to the SD70M. Like its sister road switcher, the SD70ACe, the SD70M-2 met the United States EPA Tier 2 diesel emissions requirements using the same engine. And like the "ACe", the "M-2" is certified to be in conformance with ISO 9001:2000 and ISO 14001:2004.

In June 2004, The Wall Street Journal published an article indicating EMD was being put up for sale. On January 11, 2005, Reuters published a story indicating a sale to "two private U.S. equity groups" was likely to be announced "this week". Confirmation came the following day, with a press release issued by General Motors, stating it had agreed to sell EMD to a partnership led by Greenbriar Equity Group and Berkshire Partners. The newly spun-off company was called Electro-Motive Diesel, Inc., thus retaining the famous "EMD" initials. The sale closed on April 4, 2005.

=== The Caterpillar / Progress Rail years ===
==== 2010s ====
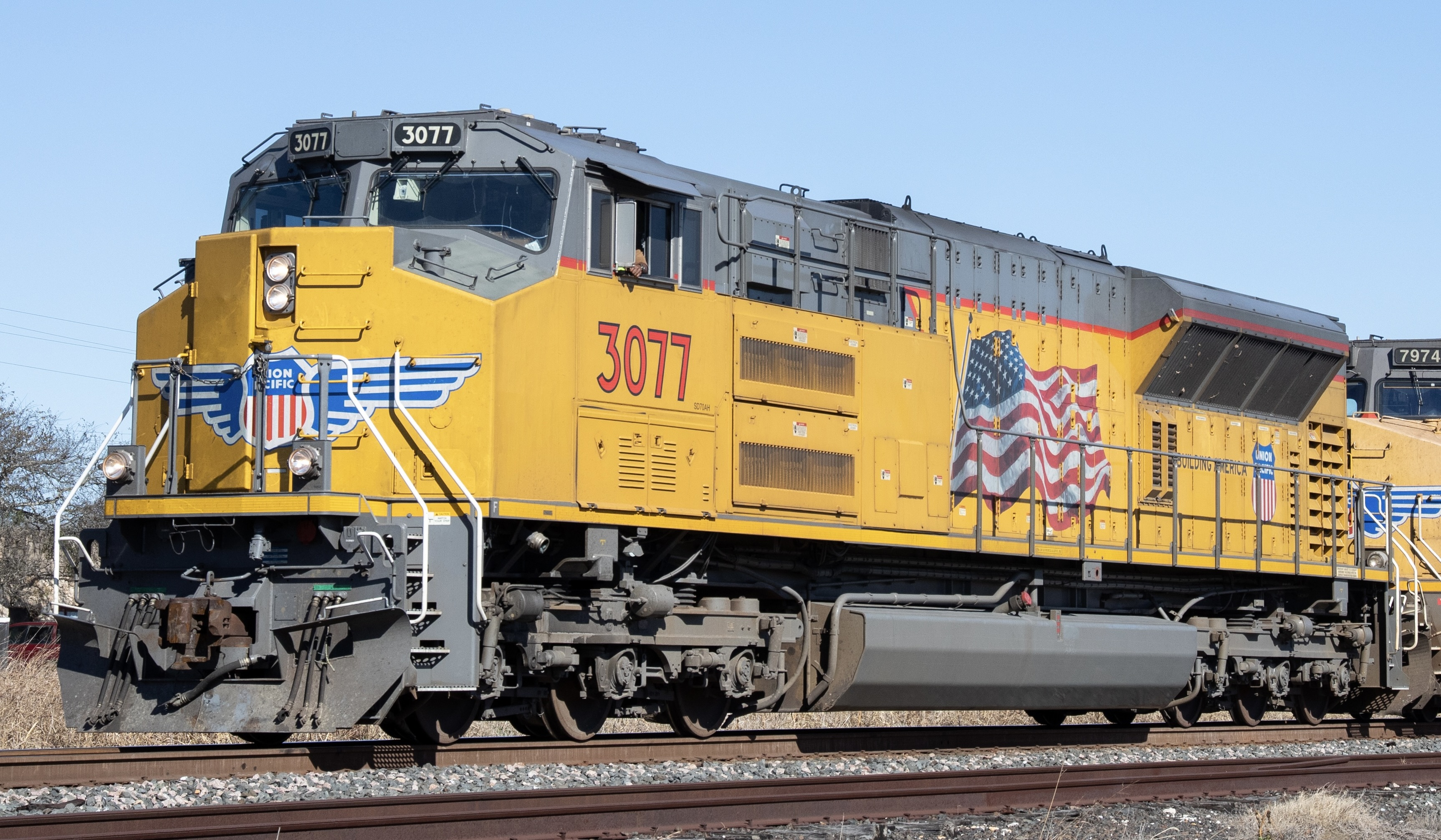
The EMD SD70ACe-T4, introduced in 2015

On June 1, 2010, Caterpillar announced it had agreed to buy Electro-Motive Diesel from Greenbriar, Berkshire et al. for $820 million. Caterpillar's wholly owned subsidiary, Progress Rail, completed the transaction on August 2, 2010. Although Caterpillar announced that John S. Hamilton would continue in his roles of president and CEO of EMD after the close of the transaction, Hamilton left EMD for unspecified reasons in late August 2010.

The U.S. Environmental Protection Agency's Tier-4 locomotive emissions regulations on new locomotives went into effect on January 1, 2015. As of that date, EMD's 710-engined locomotives (e.g. SD70ACe's) could be built only for use outside the contiguous United States (i.e. Canada, Alaska, Mexico, and overseas). EMD had originally thought the 710 engine could be modified or "tuned-up" to meet Tier-4 standards, but it was not able to meet those requirements while maintaining optimum performance and reliability during rigorous "real world conditions" tests. Development of a Tier-4-compliant locomotive shifted from its original focus on the two-stroke 710 to the four-stroke 1010J engine, derived from the 265H engine.

The first (pre-production) locomotive using the 1010J engine, the SD70ACe-T4, that used a 4,600 horsepower (3,400 kW) (4,400 traction hp) 12 cylinder engine was unveiled in late 2015. Testing of the new locomotives began in the Spring of 2016. The first two units of a 65 unit order for the new locomotive were delivered to Union Pacific in December 2016.

==== 2020s ====
In 2022, Progress Rail celebrated 100 years of EMD. Progress Rail continues to offer 710-powered EMD locomotives for export as well as "ECO" upgrade packages for modernizing of older locomotives, which sustained their business during the hiatus of locomotive production for the domestic market.

== Manufacturing and assembly facilities ==
EMD maintains major facilities in McCook, Illinois, and Muncie, Indiana in the United States, Sete Lagoas, Brazil and San Luis Potosí, Mexico. The company operated a manufacturing facility in London, Ontario, Canada until its closure in 2012.

=== EMD La Grange (McCook) ===
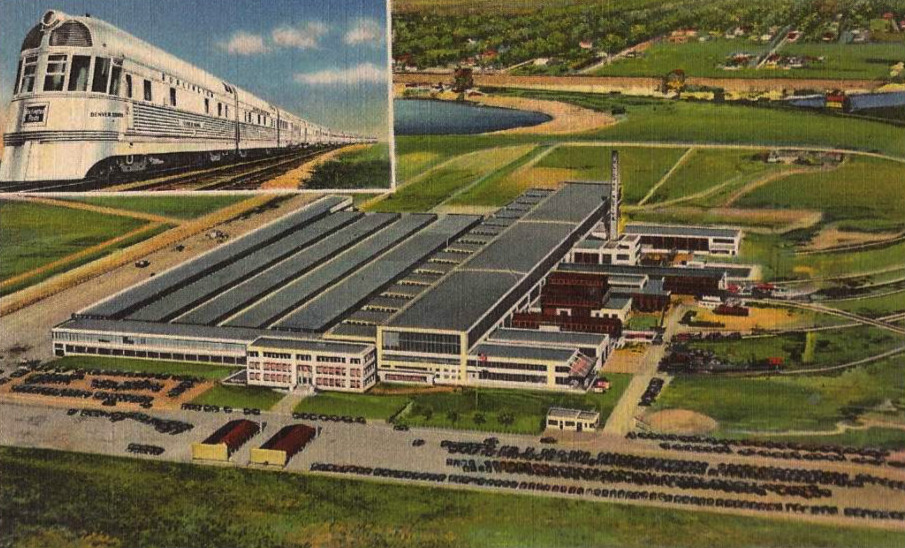
Postcard depiction of the plant circa late 1930s (Denver Zephyr train inset top left)

Since its ground breaking in 1935, the La Grange facility has been the headquarters for EMD. In addition to the corporation's administrative offices, La Grange houses design engineering, emissions testing, rebuild operations, and manufacturing of major components, including prime mover engines, traction alternators, electrical cabinets, and turbochargers. The La Grange facility includes three main buildings, with over 1,200,000 square feet (110,000 m^{2}) of office and manufacturing space. Ancillary buildings are used to provide maintenance and testing capabilities. EMD La Grange is ISO 9001:2008 Certified for Quality and ISO 14001 Certified for Environmental Management. A large part of the property's land has been sold off including the land where the original factory building stood. With the sale of the land, the large sign of "Electro Motive Division" that stood at the corner of 55th St. and East Ave. was removed but is preserved at the Illinois Railway Museum.

=== EMD London ===
The EMD London plant, in London, Ontario, Canada, opened in 1949 under EMD's Canadian subsidiary General Motors Diesel, to produce locomotives during a time of rapidly rising demand. EMD London's Canadian location was useful for General Motors' when attempting to procure Canadian federal contracts and serve Canadian rail customers. Situated on a 100-acre (0.40 km^{2}) site, the EMD London facility included two main buildings and multiple ancillary buildings with over 500,000 square feet (46,000 m^{2}) of office and manufacturing space, as well as a locomotive test track. Following reorganization under the Diesel Division of General Motors of Canada in 1969, the facility was at times used to produce a variety of products in the General Motors family, including transit buses (until 1979) and military vehicles. Following passage of the US-Canada Free Trade Agreement in 1989, EMD London became the location where all of the construction, finishing, and testing of EMD locomotives in North America was performed. The facility also manufactured components such as locomotive underframes, traction motors, truck assemblies, and locomotive equipment racks. The rate of production was approximately one locomotive completed per day. EMD London was ISO 9001:2000 Certified for Quality and ISO 14001 Certified for Environmental Management.

In January 2012, 450 Canadian Auto Workers union workers were locked out of the EMD London facility, after refusing to ratify EMD's proposed new contract which included a pay cut of 50% for some workers - labour costs at the Canadian plant were much greater than in some of the company's US plants. In February 2012 Progress Rail announced the closure of the plant; Caterpillar's actions were criticised in Canada; the company stated it would relocate production to other sites in North and South America, including the non-unionised plant in Muncie, Indiana. At the time of closure the plant employed approximately 775 people directly.

=== EMD San Luis Potosí ===
On April 14, 2010, Electro-Motive opened a facility in San Luis Potosí, Mexico for the maintenance, rebuild, and overhaul of traction motors and principal alternators equipment.

=== EMD Muncie ===
In October 2010, Caterpillar announced it was investing US$50 million to acquire and to renovate an existing 740,000-square-foot (69,000 m^{2}) building for assembly of EMD brand locomotives and to build a locomotive test track on a 75-acre (0.30 km^{2}) site located in Muncie, Indiana. The Muncie facility allows EMD to supply locomotives to publicly funded passenger rail agencies that require their rail equipment be assembled in the United States exclusively. (see Buy America Act)

On July 25, 2011, it was announced that production at the facility was planned to begin by the end of the year, with 125 workers having been hired and plans to add more. On October 28, the plant was officially opened, and the first locomotive produced at the plant, a Ferromex SD70ACe #4092, was rolled out.

=== Subcontractors and licensees ===
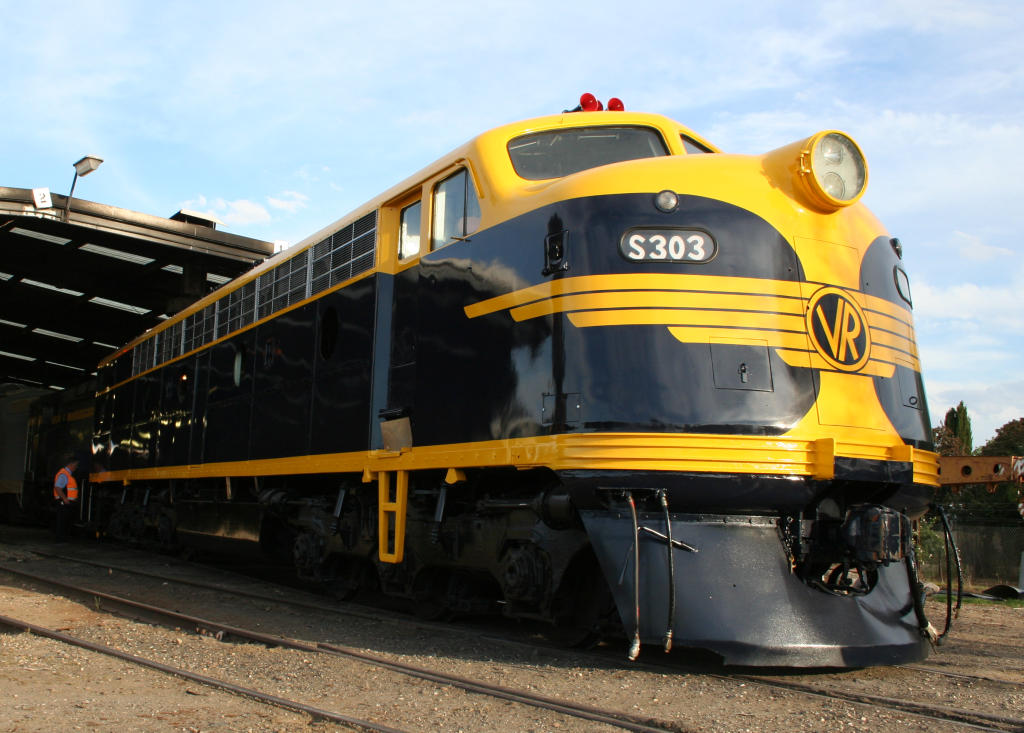
Victorian Railways S class (EMD A7) locomotive, built by Australian licensee Clyde Engineering

The company also entered into subcontracting and licensing arrangements, both for whole locomotives, and diesel and electrical drivetrains (genset plus traction motors and control electronics).

In Europe, licensees included Henschel (Germany) from the 1950s-80s which manufactured locomotives for export to African, South Asian, and Scandinavian countries, as well as Austria; NOHAB (Sweden) from the 1950s-70s, and after NOHAB's closure Kalmar Verkstad (KVAB) (Sweden) in the 1980s. When the KVAB and Henschel factories were acquired by ABB in 1990, EMD-licensed manufacture ended.

In Belgium, EMD-engined locomotives were manufactured by Société Franco-Belge, and then by La Brugeoise et Nivelles in the 1950s and 60s.

In Spain, MACOSA and its successors assembled and manufactured EMD locomotives, including standard EMD export designs as well as variants for the domestic market, as of 2011 EMD-engined diesels are still manufactured in Spain as the Vossloh Euro series.

Đuro Đaković of Croatia (Yugoslavia) also held a license from EMD and manufactured locomotives for the Yugoslav Railways.

By 2000, EMD had produced with its collaborators around 300 locomotives using EMD technology in Scandinavia, 500 in western Europe, and 400 in eastern Europe. Approximately 75% of EMD's European locomotives sold by 2000 were license-built in Europe. The company also entered into a collaboration (early 2000s) with Lyudinovsky Locomotive Plant (Russia) (Людиновский тепловозостроительный завод), (now part of Sinara Group) creating a single-body eight axle 3MW (Bo'Bo')'(Bo'Bo')' diesel locomotive ТЭРА1, powered by an EMD 710 16-cylinder engine. In the early 2010s the company began a collaboration with Croatian rolling stock company TŽV Gredelj.

Locomotives were also assembled by General Motors Industria Argentina, General Motors South Africa, and under license by Delta Motor Corporation (South Africa), Equipamentos Villares (Brazil), and Hyundai (Korea). Bombardier Transportation has also acted as subcontractor, manufacturing units at its plant in Ciudad Sahagún, Mexico since 1998, with over 1,000 locomotives completed by 2007. The manufacturing agreement continued under Progress Rail ownership.

In Australia, Clyde Engineering used EMD components in locally manufactured locomotives beginning in the 1950s. That company was absorbed into what eventually became Downer Rail.

In India, the Banaras Locomotive Works (DLW) manufactured EMD designs from the late 1990s to late 2010s. In 2010, EMD announced its intention to establish its own manufacturing facility in India, potentially in Bihar, through a PPP project with the state government, or in Uttar Pradesh. As of 2011 EMD's cooperative development association with Indian Railways is ongoing.

In China, CRRC Dalian has manufactured the EMD-designed units China Railway HXN3 (JT56ACe) since 2008.

In 2012, the EMD formed a joint venture with Barloworld, Electro-Motive Diesel Africa (Proprietary) Limited, to supply locomotive and rail-related products to the sub-saharan African market. In September 2012, EMD also signed a deal with Bombardier Transportation; Bombardier's factory in Savli, India, would assemble EMD products for Asian customers.

== Maintenance and support facilities ==
EMD also provides maintenance services, technical support, parts inventory, and sales and marketing services from many other locations spread throughout the United States, Canada, Mexico, the United Kingdom, China, India, Pakistan, Australia, Germany, Switzerland, Brazil, Egypt, and South Africa.

== Engines ==
=== Locomotive engines ===
EMD has produced this series of engines:

- EMD 567 – The 567 was produced from 1938 through 1965, named for its displacement-per-cylinder of 567.45 in^{3} (bore 8½ inches, stroke 10 inches). Other design features: two-cycle (or two-stroke), Roots-blown, Uniflow-scavenged, Unit-injected, overhead camshafts, four exhaust valves per cylinder. Built in V-6, V-8, V-12 and V-16 configurations. 567AC, 567BC, 567C, 567D and "567E" engines may be retrofitted with 645 Power assemblies and other major components, mainly for so-called "life-extension" programs; 567E engines are actually 645E blocks which were originally manufactured with 567 power assemblies
- EMD 645 – "E- and F-Engines"; in production by request; most 645 major assemblies remain in new production for replacement purposes
- EMD 710 – "G-Engine"; in production, but locomotive versions are restricted to use outside the U.S. due to EPA Tier 4 emissions regulations taking effect in 2015; mechanical unit injectors on pre-1995 engines, electronically controlled unit injectors on post-1995 engines. The 710G engine has passed tier 4 regulations.
- EMD 265 – "H-Engine"; no longer in domestic production, and most existing 265-powered locomotives in North America have been removed from service.
- EMD 1010 – "J-Engine"; in production. Introduced at the Railway Interchange Expo 2015 at BNSF North Town Yard, Minneapolis, Minnesota, from October 4 to October 7, 2015. This new engine was first used on SD70ACe-T4, the Tier 4 freight locomotive from EMD. This engine features a two-stage turbocharging system consisting of three turbochargers: one turbo (the primary/high pressure turbo) for low-mid RPM range and two turbos (the secondary/low pressure turbos) for mid-high RPM range. The results are bigger power throughout a broader RPM range, better fuel efficiency, and lower emissions.

=== Stationary and marine engines ===
Most of the above locomotive engines were available, in modified form, for stationary and marine work. Marine engines differ from railroad and stationary engines mainly in the shape and depth of the engine's oil sump, which has been altered to accommodate the rolling and pitching motions encountered in marine applications.

==== EMD "pancake" diesels ====
A new aluminum block lightweight compact engine was designed that ran at a higher rpm. These engines feature a vertical crankshaft and the cylinders were arranged in an X pattern of four cylinder banks in four cylinder rows. These were the 16-184 and 16-338 "pancake" engines. The 16-388 engine was 13.5 feet (4.1 m) from the base of the generator to the top of the air intake filter and 4 feet (1.2 m) wide. It is a mechanically injected two-stroke diesel engine that used a Roots blower. The 16-184A was installed in some 110-foot (34 m) subchasers of the SC-497 class during World War II. The two 1,540 bhp (1,150 kW) 16-184A diesel engines driving two shafts produced a faster subchaser that achieved 21 knots.

The EMD 16-338 developed 1,090 bhp (810 kW) at 1600 rpm. On the top was an air intake then four layers of four cylinders each. Each cylinder had a 6-inch (15 cm) bore and a 6 1/2-inch (17 cm) stroke. On the bottom of the crank shaft was an Elliot generator which developed 817 kW at a maximum of 710 volts DC. This proved problematic as the engine fluids ran down into the generator. The whole engine weighed just over eight tons. Being 4 feet wide it allowed for four engines in an engine room only 22 feet (6.7 m) long and also allowed design engineers to eliminate a submarine engine room. The Tang-class submarine and the research submarine USS Albacore used the troublesome EMD 16-338. On the Tang-class the Navy decided to replace the "pancake" engines with ten-cylinder Fairbanks-Morse opposed-piston 38D 8-1/8 diesels. The unreliability and lack of spares led to the decommissioning of USS Albacore in 1972 as further cannibalized parts became unavailable.

== Reporting marks ==
The following reporting marks are listed for rolling stock:

- EMDX – Electro-Motive Division Leasing
- EMLX – Electro-Motive Division Leasing
- GMCX – General Motors
- GMDX – General Motors Diesel Canada

== See also ==
- List of GM-EMD locomotives
- List of preserved EMD SD40-series locomotives
