= List of EMD locomotives =

EMD made locomotive list

The following is a list of locomotives produced by the Electro-Motive Corporation (EMC), and its successors General Motors Electro-Motive Division (GM-EMD) and Electro-Motive Diesel (EMD).

== Streamlined Power Cars and Early Experimental Locomotives ==
EMC participated in the construction of a number of motorized railcars, integrated streamliner trainsets, and experimental locomotives in the 1930s. Most of these were short production runs (one, two, or four units) that were used by a single railroad. These consisted of Winton prime movers and General Electric generating, control, and transmission components inside a carbody whose assembly was subcontracted to another manufacturer, since EMC did not commence regular road locomotive production until 1937.

Type	Road number	Build year	Total produced	AAR wheel arrangement	Prime mover	Power output	Image
EMC 1800 hp B-B	ATSF 1	1935	1	B-B+B-B	Dual Winton 12-201-A	1,800 hp (1,342 kW)	
EMC 1800 hp B-B	B&O 50	1935	1	B-B	Dual Winton 12-201-A	1,800 hp (1,342 kW)	
Flying Yankee	BM-MEC 6000	1935	1	B-2 Jacobs bogie	Winton 8-201-A	600 hp (447 kW)	
Pioneer Zephyr	CB&Q 9900	1934	1	B-2 Jacobs bogie	Winton 8-201-A	600 hp (447 kW)	
Twin Zephyr	CB&Q 9901, 9902	1935	2	B-2 Jacobs bogie	Winton 8-201-A	600 hp (447 kW)	
Mark Twain Zephyr	CB&Q 9903	1935	1	B-2 Jacobs bogie	Winton 8-201-A	600 hp (447 kW)	
Twin Zephyr	CB&Q 9904, 9905	1936	2	B-B	Dual Winton 12-201-A	1,800 hp (1342 kW)	
Denver Zephyr	CB&Q 9906, 9907	1936	2	B-B+B-B	Dual Winton 12-201-A (A-unit) Winton 16-201-A (A-unit)	1,800 hp (1342 kW, A-unit) 1,200 hp (890 kW, B-unit)	
General Pershing Zephyr	CB&Q 9908	1939	1	A1A-2	EMD 12-567	1,000 hp (745 kW)	
EMC 1800 hp B-B	EMC 511, 512	1935	2	B-B	Dual Winton 12-201-A	1,800 hp (1,342 kW)	
Green Diamond	IC 121	1936	1	B-2; Jacobs bogie	Winton 16-201-A	1,200 hp (890 kW)	
St. Louis Car Company Doodlebug	SAL 2027, 2028	1936	2	B-2	Winton 8-201-A	600 hp (447 kW	
EMC/Pullman M-10000	UP M-10000	1934	1	B-2 Jacobs bogie	Winton 12-191-A	600 hp (447 kW)	
EMC/Pullman M-10001	UP M-10001	1934	1	B-B Jacobs bogie	Winton 12-201-A	900 hp (670 kW)	
EMC/Pullman M-10002	UP M-10002	1936	1	B-B+B-B	Winton 16-201-A (A-unit) Winton 12-201-A (B-unit)	1,200 hp (890 kW, A-unit) 900 hp (670 kW, B-unit)	
EMC/Pullman M-10003 to M-10006	UP M-10003 to M-10006	1936	4	B-B+B-B	Winton 16-201-A (A-unit) Winton 16-201-A (B-unit)	1,200 hp (890 kW, A-unit) 1,200 hp (890 kW, B-unit)	
EMD LWT12	Rock Island 1–3	1956	3	B-1	EMD 12-567C	1,200 hp (890 kW)	

== Switchers (SW/NW/SC/NC/MP) ==
The "S" designation originally stood for six hundred horsepower and the "N" designation for nine hundred horsepower, although they were used for the more general designation of smaller and larger engine models after the more powerful 567 model engines replaced the Winton engines. The "C" designation stood for cast frame locomotives and the "W" designation for welded frame locomotives. EMC standardized on welded frames after 1939. The "TR" designation stood for transfer locomotives.

The SC and SW switchers were the first locomotives produced in EMC's new factory after its completion in 1936. The pre-SC and Model 90 switchers were development design locomotives outshopped in 1935.

Model designation	Build year	Total produced	AAR wheel arrangement	Prime mover	Power output	Image
EMC pre – SC	1935	2	B-B	Winton; 8-201-A	600 hp (447 kW)	
SC	1936–1939	43	B-B	Winton; 8-201-A	600 hp (447 kW)	
Model 90	1935	1	B-B	Winton; 12-201-A	900 hp (671 kW)	
SW	1936–1939	76	B-B	Winton; 8-201-A	600 hp (447 kW)	
NC	1937–1938	5	B-B	Winton; 12-201-A	900 hp (671 kW)	
NC1	1937	5	B-B	Winton; 12-201-A	900 hp (671 kW)	
NC2	1937	2	B-B	Winton; 12-201-A	900 hp (671 kW)	
T	1936	1	B-B+B-B	Dual Winton; 12-201-A	1,800 hp (1,342 kW)	
NW	1937–1938	8	B-B	Winton; 12-201-A	900 hp (671 kW)	
NW1	1937–1939	27	B-B	Winton; 12-201-A	900 hp (671 kW)	
NW1A	1938	3	B-B	Winton; 12-201-A	900 hp (671 kW)	
NW2	1939–1949	1,145	B-B	EMD 12-567 or 12-567A	1,000 hp (750 kW)	
NW3	1939–1942	7	B-B	EMD 12-567	1,000 hp (750 kW)	
NW4	1938	2	B-B	Winton; 12-201-A	900 hp (671 kW)	
NW5	1946–1947	13	B-B	EMD 12-567A	1,000 hp (750 kW)	Great Northern Railway - 192 diesel locomotive (General Motors Electro-Motive Division NW5) 1 (22105888878)
TR	1940	6	B-B+B-B; Cow–calf	Dual; EMD 12-567	2,000 hp (1,490 kW)	
TR1	1941	2	B-B+B-B; Cow–calf	Dual; EMD 16-567	2,700 hp (2,013 kW)	
TR2	1945–1949	72	B-B+B-B; Cow–calf	Dual; EMD 12-567A	2,000 hp (1,490 kW)	
TR3	1949	6	B-B+B-B+B-B; Cow–calf–calf	Triple; EMD 12-567A	3,000 hp (2,337 kW)	
TR4	1950–1951	30	B-B+B-B; Cow–calf	Dual; EMD 12-567A	2,400 hp (1,789 kW)	Baltimore and Ohio 9624 (TR4) Cow and Calf at Riverside Yard, Baltimore (22341847029)
TR5	1951	10 A units 12 B units	B-B+B-B; Cow–calf	Dual; EMD 12-567B	2,400 hp (1,789 kW)	
TR6	1950–1953	24	B-B+B-B; Cow–calf	Dual; EMD 8-567B	1,600 hp (1,193 kW)	
SW1	1939–1953	661	B-B	EMD 6-567 or 6-567A	600 hp (447 kW)	
SW7	1949–1951	489	B-B	EMD 12-567A	1,200 hp (895 kW)	
SW8	1950–1954	374	B-B	EMD 8-567B	800 hp (600 kW)	
DH2	1953	1	B-B	EMD 8-567B	800 hp (600 kW)	
SW9	1950–1953	815	B-B	EMD 12-567B	1,200 hp (890 kW)	
SW600	1954–1962	15	B-B	EMD 6-567C	600 hp (447 kW)	
SW900	1954–1969	371	B-B	EMD 8-567C	900 hp (670 kW)	
SW1000	1966–1972	119	B-B	EMD 8-645E	1,000 hp (750 kW)	
SW1001	1968–1986	230	B-B	EMD 8-645E	1,000 hp (750 kW)	
SW1200	1954–1966	1,052	B-B	EMD 12-567C	1,200 hp (890 kW)	
SW1500	1966–1974	808	B-B	EMD 12-645E	1,500 hp (1,100 kW)	
SW1504	1973	60	B-B	EMD 12-645E	1,500 hp (1,100 kW)	
MP15DC	1974–1980	351	B-B	EMD 12-645E	1,500 hp (1,100 kW)	
MP15AC	1975–1984	246	B-B	EMD 12-645E	1,500 hp (1,120 kW)	
MP15T	1984–1987	43	B-B	EMD 8-645E3	1,500 hp (1,100 kW)	
RS1325	1960	2	B-B	EMD 12-567D1	1,325 hp (988 kW)	
GMD1	1958–1960	101	B-B or A1A-A1A	EMD 12-567C	1,200 hp (890 kW)	

== Passenger Cab Units (E) ==
Model designation	Build year	Total produced	AAR wheel arrangement	Prime mover	Power output	Image
TA	1937	6	B-B	Winton 201-A	1,200 hp (890 kW)	Rock Island Rocket circa 1937
EA	1937–1938	6 AB Sets	A1A-A1A	Dual; Winton 201-A	1,800 hp (1340 kW)	EMD EA diesel locomotive of the Baltimore and Ohio Railroad
E1	1937–1938	8 A units, 3 B units	A1A-A1A	Dual; Winton 201-A	1,800 hp (1340 kW)	
E2	1937	2 ABB sets	A1A-A1A	Dual; Winton 201-A	1,800 hp (1340 kW)	
E3	1938–1940	17 A units, 2 B units	A1A-A1A	Dual; EMC 12-567	2,000 hp (1490 kW)	
E4	1938–1939	14 A units, 5 B units	A1A-A1A	Dual; EMC 12-567	2,000 hp (1490 kW)	
AA	1940	1	A1A-3	EMD 567	1,000 hp (745 kW)	
AB6	1940	2	As Built: A1A-3; After Rebuild: A1A-A1A	As Built: EMD 567; After Rebuild: Dual EMD 567	1,000 hp (745 kW) (After Rebuild: 2000 hp)	CRI&P 751 (AB6) at Joliet, IL on October 16, 1966
E5	1940–1941	11 A units, 5 B units	A1A-A1A	Dual; EMD 12-567	2,000 hp (1490 kW)	Preserved EMD E5 at Illinois Railway Museum
E6	1939–1942	91 A units, 26 B units	A1A-A1A	Dual; EMD 12-567	2,000 hp (1490 kW)	Chicago, Rock Island and Pacific Railroad E6A#630, operated by Midland Railway, at Baldwin City, Kansas on November 28, 2004.
E7	1945–1949	428 A units, 82 B units	A1A-A1A	Dual; EMD 12-567A	2,000 hp (1490 kW)	
E8	1949–1954	449 A units, 46 B units	A1A-A1A	Dual; EMD 12-567B	2,250 hp (1670 kW)	Rock Island (CRIP) locomotive#652, EMD model E8A
E9	1954–1964	100 A units, 44 B units	A1A-A1A	Dual; EMD 12-567C	2,400 hp (1800 kW)	BN 9918, an EMD E9, working on Metra's line to Aurora, Illinois, September 1992

== Freight Cab Units (F) ==
Model designation	Build year	Total produced	AAR wheel arrangement	Prime mover	Power output	Image
FT	1939–1945	555 A units, 541 B units	B-B (B-B+B-B with B unit)	EMD 16-567; EMD 16-567A	2,700 hp (with B unit)	
F2	1946	74 A units, 30 B units	B-B	EMD 16-567B	1,350 hp (1000 kW)	
F3	1946–1949	1,113 A units, 702 B units	B-B	EMD 16-567B	1,500 hp (1,100 kW)	
F7	1949–1953	2,366 A units, 1,483 B units	B-B	EMD 16-567B	1,500 hp (1,100 kW)	
FP7	1949–1953	375 A units, no B units	B-B	EMD 16-567B	1,500 hp (1,200 kW)	Western Pacific 805-A, an FP7 preserved at the Western Pacific Railroad Museum in California
F9	1953–1960	90 A units, 148 B units	B-B	EMD 16-567C	1,750 hp (1200 kW)	
FP9	1954–1959	90 A units, no B units	B-B	EMD 567C	1,750 hp (1,300 kW)	RLGN 1400 at Waterloo, Ontario, October 7, 2003
FL9	1956–1960	60 A units, no B units	B-A1A	EMD 567C or EMD 567D1; plus 660 V DC (3rd rail)	567C: 1,750 hp (1,300 kW); 567D1: 1,800 hp (1,340 kW)	

== Industrial Locomotives ==
Model designation	Build year	Total produced	AAR wheel arrangement	Prime mover	Power output	Image
Model 40	1940–1943	11	B	Dual; GM 6–71	300 hp (220 kW)	
DH1	1951	33	1A-A1	Dual; GM 6–71	340 hp (250 kW)	
GMDH-1	1956–1959	4	B-B	Detroit Model 60	2 Units: 600 hp 2 Units: 800 hp	
GMDH-3	1960	1	C	8V-71	275 hp (210 kW)	

== Military Locomotives ==
Model designation	Build year	Total produced	AAR wheel arrangement	Prime mover	Power output	Image
MRS-1	1952	13	C-C	EMD 16-567B	1,600 hp (1,200 kW) (1.2 MW)	

== Four-Axle "Branch Line" Series Roadswitchers (BL) ==
Model designation	Build year	Total produced	AAR wheel arrangement	Prime mover	Power output	Image
BL1	1947	1	B-B	EMD 16-567B	1,500 hp (1,100 kW)	
BL2	1948–1949	58	B-B	EMD 16-567B	1,500 hp (1,100 kW)	Janesville and Southeastern Railroad#52, an EMD BL2.
BL20-2	1992	3	B-B	EMD 16-567	2,000 hp (1.5 MW)	

== Four-Axle Roadswitchers or General Purpose Locomotives (GP) ==
Model designation	Build year	Total produced	AAR wheel arrangement	Prime mover	Power output	Image
GP7	1949–1954	2,729 A units 5 B units	B-B	EMD 16-567B	1,500 hp (1.1 MW)	GA#1026, a GP7 owned by the Georgia RR & Banking Co, on display in Duluth, GA
GP9	1954–1963	4,092 A units 165 B units	B-B	EMD 16-567C	1,750 hp (1.3 MW)	DVGR#40, a GP9 owned by the Shenandoah Valley RR
GP15-1	1976–1982	310	B-B	EMD 12-645E	1,500 hp (1,119 kW)	NPBL#1435 is an EMD GP15-1 owned by the Norfolk Southern Railway
GP15AC	1982	34	B-B	EMD 12-645E	1,500 hp (1,119 kW)	UPY 722-EMD GP15AC (45880320755)
GP15T	1982–1983	28	B-B	EMD 8-645E3	1,500 hp (1.1 MW)	
GP18	1959–1963	405	B-B	EMD 16-567D1	1,800 hp (1.3 MW)	
GP20	1959–1962	260	B-B	EMD 16-567D2	2,000 hp (1.5 MW)	ATSF#3055, a GP20 formerly owned by the ATSF, now part of the BNSF
GP28	1964–1965	31	B-B	EMD 16-567D1	1,800 hp (1.3 MW)	
GP30	1961–1963	908 A units 40 B units	B-B	EMD 16-567D3	2,250 hp (1.6 MW)	LN#1030, a GP30 formerly owned by the Louisville & Nashville, now part of CSX
GP35	1963–1966	1,334	B-B	EMD 16-567D3A	2,500 hp (1.9 MW)	
GP38	1966–1971	706	B-B	EMD 16-645E	2,000 hp (1.5 MW)	CCP#2008, an EMD GP38 formerly owned by the Chicago Central and Pacific RR, now part of CN
GP38AC	1970–1971	261	B-B	EMD 16-645E	2,000 hp (1.5 MW)	LLPX#2210, an EMD GP38AC, a rental locomotive owned by the GATX Rail Locomotive Group, at Kitchener, Ontario
GP38-2	1972–1986	2,213	B-B	EMD 16-645E	2,000 hp (1.5 MW)	IMCX#3801, a GP38-2 owned by the Mosaic Co, near Brewster, FL
GP38-2L			B-B	EMD 16-645E	2,000 hp (1.5 MW)	
GP38-2W	1973–1974	51	B-B	EMD 16-645E	2,000 hp (1.5 MW)	CN#4769, an EMD GP38-2W owned by Canadian National, at St Félicien, Québec, Canada
GP39	1969–1970	21	B-B	EMD 12-645E3	2,300 hp (1.7 MW)	
GP39DC	1970	2	B-B	EMD 12-645E3	2,300 hp (1.7 MW)	
GP39X	1980	6	B-B	EMD 12-645E3	2,600 hp (2.0 MW)	
GP39-2	1974–1984	239	B-B	EMD 12-645E3	2,300 hp (1.7 MW)	BNSF#2866, a GP39-2 owned by the Burlington Northern Santa Fe RR, at Commerce, CA
GP40	1965–1971	1,221	B-B	EMD 16-645E3	3,000 hp (2.2 MW)	DME#4006, a GP40 owned by the Dakota, Minnesota & Eastern, running long hood forward at Byron, MN
GP40P	1968	13	B-B	EMD 16-645E3	3,000 hp (2.2 MW)	
GP40P-2	1974	3	B-B	EMD 16-645E3	3,000 hp (2.2 MW)	
GP40TC	1966	8	B-B	EMD 16-645E3	3,000 hp (2.2 MW)	
GP40X	1965; 1977–1978	24	B-B	EMD 16-645F3B	3,500 hp (2.2 MW)	
GP40-2	1972–1986	1,140	B-B	EMD 16-645E3	3,000 hp (2.2 MW)	CSXT#6023 and #6019, GP40-2s owned by CSX, now fitted for remote operation, near Tampa, FL
GP49	1983–1985	9	B-B	EMD 12-645F3B	2,800 hp (2.1 MW)	
GP50	1980–1985	278	B-B	EMD 16-645F3B	3,500 hp (2.6 MW)	BN#3157, a GP50 formerly owned by the Burlington Northern, now part of BNSF.
GP59	1985–1989	36	B-B	EMD 12-710G3A	3,000 hp (2.2 MW)	NS#4610, a GP59 owned by the Norfolk Southern RR, painted in Southern Railway scheme
GP60	1985–1994	294 A units 23 B units	B-B	EMD 16-710G3A	3,800 hp (2.8 MW)	SSW#9673, a GP60 formerly owned by the Cotton Belt RR, later part of the Southern Pacific – and now the Union Pacific.
GP60M	1990	63	B-B	EMD 16-710G3A	3,800 hp (2.8 MW)	BNSF#122, a GP60M owned by the Burlington Northern Santa Fe RR, formerly an ATSF unit
GP15D	2000–2001	20	B-B	Caterpillar 3512 (EMD 12-170B15-T2)	1,500 hp (1.2 MW)	
GP20D	2000–2001	40	B-B	Caterpillar 3516 (EMD 16-170B20-T2)	2,000 hp (1.5 MW)	

== Six-Axle Locomotives or Special Duty Locomotives (SD) ==
Model designation	Build year	Total produced	AAR wheel arrangement	Prime mover	Power output	Image
SD7	1952–1953	188	C-C	EMD 16-567B	1,500 hp (1.1 MW)	
SD9	1954–1959	515	C-C	EMD 16-567C	1,750 hp (1.7 MW)	
SD18	1960–1963	114	C-C	EMD 16-567D1	1,800 hp (1.3 MW)	
SD24	1958–1963	224	C-C	EMD 16-567D3	2,400 hp (1,880 kW)	
SD28	1965–1966	12	C-C	EMD 16-567D1	1,800 hp (1,300 kW)	
SD35	1964–1966	360	C-C	EMD 16-567D3A	2,500 hp (1.9 MW)	CNJ SD35 2512 at Jim Thrope, PA on July 12, 1970 02 (24160277741)
SDP35	1964–1965	35	C-C	EMD 16-567D3A; Steam generator	2,500 hp (1.9 MW)	
SD38	1967–1971	108	C-C	EMD 16-645E	2,000 hp (1,500 kW)	
SD38AC	1971	15	C-C	EMD 16-645E	2,000 hp (1,500 kW)	B&LE SD38AC
SD38-2	1972–1979	90	C-C	EMD 16-645E	2,000 hp (1,500 kW)	
SDP38	1967	40	C-C	EMD 16-645E	2,000 hp (1,500 kW)	
SD39	1968–1970	54	C-C	EMD 12-645E3	2,300 hp (1,700 kW)	EMD SD39 East portal of the Hoosac Tunnel.
SDL39	1969–1972	10	C-C	EMD 12-645E3	2,300 hp (1.7 MW)	
SD40X	1964–1965, 1979	13	C-C	EMD 16-645E3	3,000 hp (2.2 MW)	
SD40	1966–1972	1,268	C-C	EMD 16-645E3	3,000 hp (2.2 MW)	BNSF 6367, at Commerce, California, October 2006
SD40A	1969–1970	18	C-C	EMD 16-645E3	3,000 hp (2,240 kW)	
SDP40	1966–1970	20	C-C	EMD 16-645E3; Steam generator	3,000 hp (2,240 kW)	
SD40T-2	1974–1980	312	C-C	EMD 16-645E3	3,000 hp (2.2 MW)	EMD SD40T-2 Locomotive UP 2935 at Anaheim, California, US.
SD40-2	1972–1989	3,896	C-C	EMD 16-645E3	3,000 hp (2.2 MW)	
SD40-2W	1975–1980	123	C-C	EMD 16-645E3	3,000 hp (2.2 MW)	Canadian National#5321, an EMD SD40-2W
SD40-2S	1978–1980	12	C-C	EMD 16-645E3	3,000 hp (2.2 MW)	
SD45	1965–1971	1,260	C-C	EMD 20-645E3	3,600 hp (2.7 MW)	Erie Lackawanna 3607, preserved at the St.Louis Museum of Transportation
SD45X	1970–1971	7	C-C	EMD 20-645E3A	4,200 hp (3.1 MW)	
SDP45	1967–1970	52	C-C	EMD 20-645E3; Steam generator	3,600 hp (2.7 MW)	Burlington Northern Railroad EMD SDP45 diesel locomotive#6597
SD45T-2	1972–1975	247	C-C	EMD 20-645E3	3,600 hp (2.7 MW)	EMD SD45T-2 SP.
SD45-2	1972–1974	136	C-C	EMD 20-645E3	3,600 hp (2.7 MW)	
SD50	1980–1985	426	C-C	EMD 16-645F3B	3,500–3,600 hp (2.6 MW)	CSX Corporation EMD SD50 diesel locomotive
SD50S	1980	6	C-C	EMD 16-645F3B	3,500 hp (2.6 MW)	
SD60	1984–1991	737	C-C	EMD 16-710G3A	3,800 hp (2.8 MW)	Soo Line 6022, an EMD SD60, pulls a Westbound train through Wisconsin Dells, WI.
SD60I	1993–1995	188	C-C	EMD 16-710G3A	3,800 hp (2.8 MW)	EMD SD60I, CSX Transportation; Plymouth Michigan
SD60M	1989–1993	564	C-C	EMD 16-710G3A	3,800 hp (2.8 MW)	
SD60MAC	1991–1992	44	C-C	EMD 16-710G3A	3,800 hp (2.8 MW)	
SD70	1992–1999	122	C-C	EMD 16-710G3B	4,000 hp (3.2 MW)	
SD70I	1995	26	C-C	EMD 16-710G3B	4,000 hp (3.2 MW)	CN SD70I similar design to the SD70M. Differences include an isolated cab.
SD70ACe	2003–	3,246	C-C	EMD 16-710G3C-T2	4,300 hp (3.2 MW)	
SD70ACS	2009–	86	C-C	EMD 16-710G3A	4,500 hp (3.4 MW)	EMDX 3025 (behind 3024, 3023, 3017) SD70ACS heading north through St. Mary's from EMD plant in London Ontario. Part of 25-unit order for Saudi Railway Company (SAR)
SD70M	1992–2004	1,758	C-C	EMD 16-710G3B	4,000 hp (3.2 MW)	UP SD70M.
SD70M-2	2004–	363	C-C	EMD 16-710G3C	4,300 hp (3.2 MW)	
SD70MAC	1993–2004	1,154	C-C	EMD 16-710G3B/C	4,000-4,300 hp (3.2 MW)	
SD75M	1995–1996	76	C-C	EMD 16-710G3C	4,300 hp (3.2 MW)	BNSF 8231 Showing 2nd blower duct on this side.
SD75I	1996–1999	207	C-C	EMD 16-710G3C	4,300 hp (3.2 MW)	
SD80MAC	1995–1996	37	C-C	EMD 20-710G3B	5,000 hp (3.7 MW)	5,000 horsepower EMD SD80MAC 4100 in Conrail Livery
SD89MAC	2000	1	C-C	EMD 12-265H	4,500 hp (3.4 MW)	
SD90MAC	1995–2005	657	C-C	EMD 16-265H/EMD 16-710G3B	6,000/4,300 hp (4.5 MW)	Union Pacific#8512 an SD90MAC
SD70ACe-T4	2015–	123	C-C	EMD 12-1010J	4,600 hp (3.5 MW)	UP SD70ACe-T4 #3053

== Eight-Axle Locomotives ==
Model designation	Build year	Total produced	AAR wheel arrangement	Prime mover	Power output	Image
DD35	1963–1964	30	D-D	Dual; 16-567D3A	5,000 hp (3.7 MW)	B Unit
DD35A	1965	15	D-D	Dual; 16-567D3A	5,000 hp (3.7 MW)	What_an_awesome_lash-up!_DD35A,_DD35B,_DD35B,_GP30B-_17,225_horsepower._March_1979
DDA40X	1969–1971	47	D-D	Dual; 16-645E3A	6,600 hp (4.9 MW)	Union Pacific #6936 is the only DDA40X still in service with Union Pacific Railroad, though it is mostly used to haul excursions.

== Cowl Units ==
locomotives with a fully enclosed carbody

Model designation	Build year	Total produced	AAR wheel arrangement	Prime mover	Power output	Image
FP45	1967–1970	14	C-C	EMD 20-645E3 with steam generator	3,600 hp (2.7 MW)	
F45	1968–1971	86	C-C	EMD 20-645E3	3,600 hp (2.7 MW)	
SDP40F	1973–1974	150	C-C	EMD 16-645E3 with steam generator	3,000 hp (2.2 MW)	
F40C	1974	15	C-C	EMD 16-645E3 with HEP	3,200 hp (2.3 MW)	EMD F40C diesel locomotive owned by Metra (Chicago)#602
F40PH	1975–1988	187	B-B	EMD 16-645E3 With HEP	3,000–3,200 hp (2.2–2.4 MW)	Amtrak EMD F40PH No. 229 leading the San Diegan into Los Angeles in 1978
F40PHR	1977–1985	132	B-B	EMD 16-645E3 With HEP	3,000 hp (2.2 MW)	Amtrak EMD F40PHR No. 315 leading the California Zephyr out of Tunnel No. 17 in 1995
F40PH-2M	1982–1985	4	B-B	EMD 16-645E3 With HEP	3,000 hp (2.2 MW)	Rust-red locomotive with smooth front in rail yard
F40PH-2	1985–1989	31	B-B	EMD 16-645E3	3,200 hp (2.4 MW)	Metra EMD F40PH-2 No. 120 at Deerfield, Illinois
F40PH-2C	1987–1988	26	B-B	EMD 16-645E3	3,200 hp (2.4 MW)	MBTA EMD F40PH-2C No. 1064 at Ruggles in 2008
F40PHM-2	1991–1992	30	B-B	EMD 16-645E3	3,200 hp (2.4 MW)	Metra EMD F40PHM-2 No. 185 at Lisle, Illinois
F40PH-3C	1998	6	B-B			
F40PH-2C	1987	6	B-B			
F40PHM-2C	1994	17	B-B			
F40PHL-2	1985	5	B-B			
SD40-2F	1988	25	C-C	EMD 16-645E3	3,000 hp (2.2 MW)	CP 9011 on Train 119-25 in Chalk River, ON
SD50F	1985–1987	60	C-C	EMD 16-645F3B	3,600 hp (2.6 MW)	
SD60F	1985–1989	64	C-C	EMD 16-710G3A	3,800 hp (2.8 MW)	
F59PH	1988–1994	72	B-B	EMD 12-710G3	3,000 hp (2.2 MW)	
F59PHI	1994–2001	83	B-B	EMD 12-710G3	3,000 hp (2.2 MW)	EMD F59PHI, Amtrak/NCDOT "Piedmont" passenger train north, out of Charlotte, NC, at 6:45pm, near the intersection of I-485 and NC 49
F69PHAC	1989	2	B-B	EMD 12-710G3	3,000 hp (2.2 MW)	
DE30AC, DM30AC	1997–1999	23 (DE30AC); 23 (DM30AC)	B-B	EMD 12N-710G3B-EC	3,000 hp (2.2 MW)	An example of an DM30AC body type (also used for the DE30AC)
F125	2015–2021	40	B-B	Caterpillar C175-20	4,700 hp (3.46 MW)	

== Electric Locomotives ==
Model designation	Build year	Total produced	AAR wheel arrangement	Voltage	Power output	Image
SW1200MG	1963–1971	9	B-B	2,400 V AC 60 Hz (Overhead)		Photos
AEM-7	1978–1988	65	B-B	11,000 V AC, 25 Hz; 11,000–13,500 V AC, 60 Hz; 25,000 V AC, 60 Hz (Overhead)	7,000 hp (5.2 MW)	AEM-7 916 at Union Station, Washington, D.C.
GM5FC	1985–1987	45	C-C	25,000 V AC, 50 Hz	5,550 hp (4,140 kW)	
GM6C	1975	1	C-C	11,000 V AC, 25 Hz; 25,000 V AC, 60 Hz (Overhead)	6,000 hp (4,470 kW)	
GM10B	1976	1	B-B-B	11,000 V AC, 25 Hz; 25,000 V AC, 60 Hz (Overhead)	10,000 hp (7,460 kW)	
GF6C	1983–1984	7	C-C	50,000 V AC	6,000 hp (4,470 kW)	

== Battery-Electric Locomotives ==
Model designation	Build year	Total produced	AAR wheel arrangement	Voltage	Power output	Image
Joule Series	2022–					
BE14.5BB			B+B-B+B	Battery electric locomotive Battery capacity: 14.5 megawatt hours		

== Export and Narrow Gauge Locomotives ==
Model designation	Build year	Total produced	AAR wheel arrangement	Prime mover	Power output	Image
NF110	1952–1953	9	C-C	EMD 12-567	1,200 hp (890 kW)	Preserved GMDD NF110 902 at Lewisporte, Newfoundland.
NF210	1956–1960	38	C-C	EMD 12-567C	1,200 hp (890 kW)	Ever Hear of a GMD NF210 Diesel locomotive? -- 2 Photos (35574080381)
B12	1953–1956	49	B-B (9); A1A-A1A (40)	EMD 567	1,125 hp (840 kW)	EMD B12 B-B nº6009 – RFFSA
G6B	1963–1968	75	B-B	EMD 6-567C/EMD 6-645E	600/650/750	
GM6	1959–1961	6	C	EMD 6-567C	600 hp (450 kW)	
G8	1954–1965	382	B-B or A1A-A1A	EMD 8-567C	950/875	ID diesel loco BB 200-05 040913 004 lpy
G8C	1960–1964	18	C-C	EMD 8-567C/EMD 8-567CR	275-835	
GL8	1960–1965	149	B-B (137); A1A-A1A (12)	EMD 8-567C/EMD 8-567CR	950/870	
GL8C	1963	12		EMD 567		
GA8	1960–1968	94	B-B	EMD 8-567CR/EMD 8-567E	850/800	S300 series Locomotive of Taiwan Railway Administration
JL8	1962	37	B-B	EMD 8-567C	950/875	
T41	1956	5	A1A-A1A	EMD 12-567C	1428/1065	T41 204-Karlsborgsbruk-2012
T43	1961–1963	50	B-B	EMD 12-567C	1428/1065	
G12	1953–1968	979	B-B or A1A-A1A	EMD 12-567C	1425/1310	Locomotive#120 of Israel Railways.
GL12	1967	10	B-B	EMD 12-567E	1425/1310	
GA12	1961–1962	30	1B-B1	EMD 12-567C	1275/1200	
G12C	1964–1966	42	C-C	EMD 12-567C	1425/1310	
GA12C	1964	25	1B-B1	EMD 12-567C	1275/1200	
GR12	1961–1969	151	C-C	EMD 12-567C	1425/1310	
G16	1958–1972	430	C-C	EMD 16-567C	1950/1800	
GT16	1962	72	C-C	EMD 16-567D3	2700/2500	
G18	1967–1981	59	B-B or A1A-A1A	EMD 8-645E	1100/1000	
GL18M	1977	30	A1A-A1A or C-C	EMD 8-645E	1100/1000	
GL18C	1966–1968	56	C-C	EMD 8-645E		
GL18B	1990–2000	28	B-B	EMD 8-645	1000	
GA18	1969	7	B-B	EMD 8-645E	1100/1000	S400 series Locomotive of Taiwan Railway Administration
GT18MC	1974–1978	252	C-C	EMD 8-645E3	1525/1425	
GT18B-M	2001–2004	59		EMD 8-645E3C		
GT18LC-2	1970–2001	87	C-C	EMD 8-645E3C	1,500 hp (1,120 kW)	
JL18	1966	12	B-B	EMD 8-645E	1100/1000	
JT18-LC	1990	3	C-C	EMD 8-645E3C	1500/1500	
T44	1968–1987	123	B-B	EMD 12-645E	1656/1235	Diesellok T44
T46	1973–1974	4	C-C			
G22W	1967–1987	223	B-B	EMD 12-645E	1650/1500	
G22W-AC	1980–1991	231	B-B	EMD 12-645E		Egypt ENR EMD G22W AC 02
G22W-2	1991	3	C-C	EMD 12-645E	1650/1500	
G22U	1967–1981	290	A1A-A1A	EMD 12-645E	1650/1500	R100 (AAR wheel arrangement: A1A-A1A series locomotive of Taiwan Railway Administration
G22CW, G22CW-2	1969–1990	58	C-C	EMD 16-645E	2250/2000	El Gran Capitán
G22CU	1969–1982	213	C-C	EMD 12-645E	1650/1500	
G22CU-2	1992–2001	21	C-C	EMD 12-645E	1650/1500	
GL22C	1971–1977	38	C-C	EMD 12-645E	1650/1500	
GL22C-2; QR Class 2400 / 2450 / 2470	1996	80	C-C	EMD 12-645E	1650/1500	
GT22CW	1972–1988	107	C-C	EMD 12-645E3	2475/2250	
GT22CU	1972–1980	54	C-C	EMD 12-645E3	2475/2250	
GT22HW-2	1981–1984	34	A1A-A1A	EMD 12-645E3	2168/1617	
GT22CUM-1	1982	52	C-C	EMD 12-645E3		
GT22CUM-2	1986	10	C-C	EMD 12-645E3		
GT22CW-2	1988–1997	41	C-C	EMD 12-645E3		
GT22LC	1985–1986	28	C-C	EMD 12-645E3		
GT22LC-2	1981–1996	129	C-C	EMD 12-645E3		HGG-ZugNr12Gweru
JT22CW	1976–1984	25	C-C	EMD 12-645E3	2450/2250	
JT22MC	1983–1985	30	C-C	EMD 12-645E3	2475/2250	
JT22LC-2	1981	10	C-C	EMD 12-645E3B	2475/2250	
G26	1969–1980	116	C-C	EMD 16-645E	2,200 hp (1,640 kW)	
G26CW	1982–1989	137	C-C	EMD 16-645E		
G26CU	1972–1977	44	C-C	EMD 16-645E	2250/2000	
G26MC-2U	1986–2008	48	C-C	EMD 16-645E	2250/2000	
GL26AC	1978–1979	14	C-C	EMD 16-645E	2000/1491	
GL26C	1983	3	C-C	EMD 16-645E	2250/2000	
GL26C-AC		34	C-C	EMD 16-645E		
GL26C-2		45	C-C	EMD 16-645E		
GL26MC	1966	20	C-C	EMD 16-645E	2200/2000	
GT26CW	1967–1988	131	C-C	EMD 16-645E3	3300/3000	
GT26CWP	1976		C-C	EMD 16-645E3		
GT26CW-1	1971–1985	369	C-C	EMD 16-645E3	3,000 hp (2,200 kW)	
GT26CW-2	1972–2006	481	C-C	EMD 16-645E3	3300/3000	GT26CW2-IR701
GT26HCW-2	1989–1994	20	C-C	EMD 16-645E3		
GT26MC	1971–1982	309	C-C	EMD 16-645E3	2900/2600	
GT26CU-2	1976–1992	53	C-C	EMD 16-645E3	3300/3000	
GT26CU-MP	1990–1992	24	C-C	EMD 16-645E3	3300/3000	
JT26CW-SS; Class 59	1985–1995	15	C-C	EMD 16-645E3C	3,300 hp (2,460 kW)	
DDM45	1970–1976	83	D-D	EMD 20-645E3	3,600 hp (2,680 kW)	EMD DDM45 D-D nº813 – EFVM
FT36HCW-2	1986–1987	15	C-C	EMD 16-645F3B/EMD 16-645E3	3,300 hp (2,500 kW)	
GT36CW	2007	16	C-C	EMD 16-645F3B	3,600 hp (2,680 kW)	
GT36HCW	2007-2008	14	C-C	EMD 16-645F3B	3,600 hp (2,680 kW)	
GT38ACe	2011–2021	91	C-C	EMD 8-710G3A	2200/2000	
GT42AC	2018–	20	C-C		3,000 hp (2,240 kW)	
JT42HCW	1994–1995	34	C-C	EMD 12-710G3B	3,000 hp (2,240 kW)	
JT42CW	1996	8	C-C	EMD 12N-710G3B	3,000 hp (2,240 kW)	
JT42BW	1996–2006	48	B-B	EMD 12N-710G3B	3,000 hp (2,240 kW)	
JT42CWR; BR Class 66	1998–2017	695	C-C	EMD 12N-710G3B-EC/EMD 12N-710G3B-T2	3,000 hp (2,240 kW)	
GT46MAC	1997–2017	1,432	C-C	EMD 16-710G3B	4500	
GT46PAC	2001–2010	282	C-C	EMD 16-710G3B	4500	
GT50AC	2012–2018	7	C-C	EMD 20N-710G3B-ES	5500	
Euro 4000	2006–2015	168	C-C	EMD 16-710G3C-U2	4,250 hp (3,170 kW)	
JT56ACe	2007–2015	334	C-C	EMD 16-265H	6,000 hp (4,470 kW)	
GPL-15T	2004–2008	16	B-B	EMD 8-645E	1,500 hp (1100 kW)	
SDP28	1966	6	C-C	EMD 16-567D1	1,800 hp (1,340 kW)	
SDP38	1967	40	C-C	EMD 16-645E	2,000 hp (1,490 kW)	
SD38-2TC	1994	8	C-C	EMD 16-645E	2,000 hp (1,490 kW)	
SDL38-2	1978	6	C-C	EMD 16-645E	2,000 hp (1,490 kW)	
SDL40-2	1981–1997	21	C-C	EMD 16-645E3	3,000 hp (2,240 kW)	
SDL50	1981–2005	31	C-C	EMD 16-645F3B	3,500 hp (2,610 kW)	
SD70ACe-BB	2015–present		B+B-B+B	EMD 16-710G3C-T1	3,240 hp (2,420 kW)	

== Aftermarket Conversions ==
Model designation	Rebuild year	Total rebuilt	AAR wheel arrangement	Prime mover	Power output	Image
SWBLW "Beep"	1970	1	B-B	EMD 16-567BC	1,500 hp (1,119 kW)	
SW10	1980–1999	75	B-B	EMD 8-645E	1,000 hp (750 kW)	UP No. 1266. An EMD SW10
SW14	1978–1982	112	B-B	EMD 12-567B	1,000 hp (750 kW)	
CF7	1970–1978	233	B-B	EMD 16-567BC	1,500 hp (1,119 kW)	
GP5	1958–1959	16	B-B	EMD 16-567 (Traded from EMD FT)	1,350 hp (1,000 kW)	
GP7U			B-B			
GP8	1969–1978	111	B-B	EMD 567BC		
GP10	1967–1979		B-B	EMD 567C		
GP11	1978–1981	54	B-B			
GP15C	1990–1991	7	B-B	CAT 3512	1,500 hp (1,100 kW)	
GP16	1979–1982	155	B-B	EMD 16-645	1,600 hp (1,200 kW)	
G18AR	1979–1981	10	A1A-A1A	EMD 8-645	950 hp (709 kW)	
G22AR	1977–1982	85	A1A-A1A	EMD 12-645	1,650 hp (1,230 kW)	
G22CR	1998–2001	16	C-C	EMD 12-645	1,650 hp (1,230 kW)	
GP28M			B-B			
GP28P			B-B			
GP30C	1990–1991	3	B-B	CAT 3515	2,000 hp (1,500 kW)	
GP38H-3	2004–2005	8	B-B	EMD 16-645E with HEP	2,000 hp (1.5 MW)	
GP39H-2	1988	6	B-B	EMD 16-645E with HEP	2,300 hp (1.7 MW)	
GP40-2H	1996	6	B-B	EMD 16-645E3 with HEP		
GP40FH-2	1987–1990		B-B	EMD 16-645E3 with HEP	3,000 hp (2.2 MW)	
GP40PH-2	1991–1994		B-B	EMD 16-645E3 with HEP	3,000 hp (2.2 MW)	
GP40WH-2	1990	20	B-B	EMD 16-645E3	3,000 hp (2.2 MW)	MARC GP40WH-2#52 at Camden Station, Baltimore, Maryland
SD20			C-C		2,000 hp (1,490 kW)	
SD20-2	1964–1980	5	C-C			
SD26	1973–1978	80	C-C	EMD 567 with 645 power assemblies	2,650 hp (1,980 kW)	
SD39-2M			C-C	EMD 12-645E	2,300 hp (1.7 MW)	
GP22ECO	2009		B-B	EMD 8-710	2,150 hp (1,600 kW)	
SD22ECO	2009	4	C-C	EMD 8-710	2,150 hp (1,600 kW)	
SD32ECO	2009		C-C	EMD 12-710	3,150 hp (2,350 kW)	
GP20C-ECO	2013	130	B-B	EMD 8-710-G3A	2,000 hp (1,490 kW)	
SD30C-ECO	2013–2017	63	C-C	EMD 12-710-G3	3,000 hp (2,240 kW)	
SD70MACH	2022–		C-C	EMD 16-710G3C	4,500 hp (3,360 kW)	
J16CW/AC	1984–1985	20	C-C	EMD 16-567C	1,870 hp (1,390 kW)	

== Proposed, but Never Built ==
Model designation	Proposal year	AAR wheel arrangement	Prime mover	Power output	Notes
EMD RB-3600	1960s	C-C	2x EMD 12-567	3,600 horsepower (2,700 kW)	Offered to Southern Pacific as a competitor to the KM ML 4000 diesel-hydraulic locomotives. Replaced by the EMD DD35.
SD49	-	C-C	EMD 12-645F3B	-	Six-axled version of the GP49
EMD AMT-125	late 1970s	B-B	Likely EMD 645	-	Streamlined 125 MPH locomotive for unrealized Amtrak high-speed services on un-electrified lines in a top-and-tail formation with Amfleet cars similar to British Rail's contemporary HST.

== See also ==
- List of preserved EMD locomotives
