= EMC Winton-engined switchers =

North American diesel locomotive

Early Electro-Motive Corporation switcher locomotives were built with Winton 201-A engines. A total of 175 were built between February 1935 and January 1939. Two main series of locomotives were built, distinguished by engine size and output: the straight-8, 600 hp (450 kW) 'S' series (with the 'S' standing for "six hundred" horsepower), and the V12, 900 hp (670 kW) 'N' series (with the 'N' standing for "nine hundred" horsepower). Both were offered with either one-piece cast underframes from General Steel Castings of Granite City, Illinois, denoted by 'C' after the power identifier, and fabricated, welded underframes built by EMC themselves, denoted by 'W'. This gave four model series: SC, SW, NC and NW. Further developments of the 900 hp (670 kW) models gave model numbers NC1, NC2, NW1, and NW1A, all of which were practically indistinguishable externally from the others, as well as a pair of unique NW4 models for the Missouri Pacific Railroad and a solitary, twin-engined T transfer locomotive model built for the Illinois Central Railroad.

== 600 hp (450 kW) S series ==
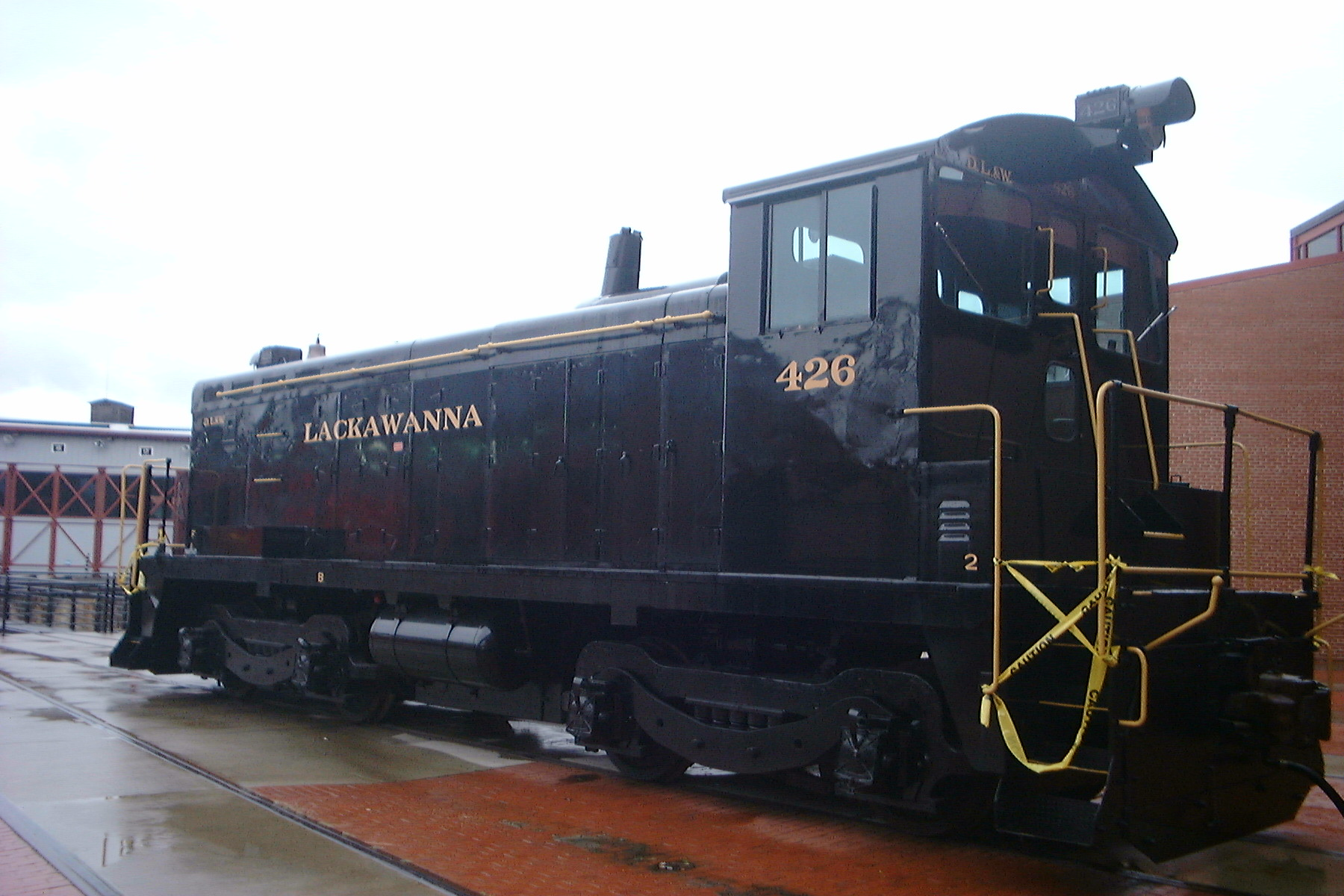
Lackawanna 426, a preSC

The production S series locomotives are identical except for cast or welded underframes, which are identical to those used under the N-series 900 hp (670 kW) locomotives. The hood on the S series is shorter, and the locomotives have a characteristic, rounded-edged "satchel" in front of the radiator. The straight-8 600 hp (450 kW) Winton 201-A engine moved the exhaust stacks off-center to the engineer's left, while the N series' were central. The Winton-engined switchers can be distinguished from later EMD 567-engined units by small louvres at the top front sides of their hoods, as well as top-of-hood ventilation through several lifting vents rather than the large top grille of those later units.

The 600 hp (450 kW) series was much more successful than the 900 hp (670 kW) during this early period; 114 were sold.

=== Pre-SC ===
Two pre-production units were built in February 1935; they differed from full production units by having a hood that did not taper in toward the cab, and six rather than three small louvres on each top front hood side. They were delivered to the Delaware, Lackawanna and Western Railroad as Nos. 425 and 426. Both were re-engined with EMD 567 engines in 1962. One, 426, was purchased by the Delaware-Lackawanna Railroad and is on display at Steamtown National Historic Site in Lackawanna colors.

=== SC ===
43 cast-frame SC units were built between May 1936 and January 1939. They were delivered to a wide assortment of railroads:

1. Atchison, Topeka and Santa Fe Railway: 4 locomotives, #2301, 2151–2153
2. Inland Steel: 3 locomotives, #40, 42 & 44
3. New York Central Railroad: 7 locomotives, #567-573 (CR&I)
4. Boston and Maine Railroad: 6 locomotives, #1103-1108
5. Chicago Great Western Railway: 3 locomotives, #5-7
6. South Buffalo Railway: 2 locomotives, #50 and 51
7. River Terminal Railway: 1 locomotive, #52
8. Electro-Motive Corporation: 1 locomotive, #620 to Canton #20
9. Philadelphia, Bethlehem and New England Railroad: 2 locomotives, #204 and 205
10. Patapsco and Back Rivers Railroad: 3 locomotives, #51-53
11. Minneapolis and St. Louis Railway: 1 locomotive, 637
12. Missouri Pacific Railroad: 4 locomotives, #9000-9003
13. Grand Trunk Western Railroad: 2 locomotives, #7800-7801
14. Central Railroad of New Jersey: 4 locomotives, #1005-1008

One SC locomotive still survives: Missouri Pacific 9001 (as Dardanelle & Russellville 14, a later owner) at the Illinois Railway Museum it is not operational.

=== SW ===
76 fabricated welded-frame SW units were built between December 1936 and January 1939. Original owners included:

1. Elgin, Joliet and Eastern Railway: 9 locomotives, #200-#208
2. Reading Company: 6 locomotives, #10-15
3. River Terminal Railway: 1 locomotive, #51
4. Chicago and Eastern Illinois Railroad: 2 locomotives, #100-#101
5. Philadelphia, Bethlehem and New England Railroad: 1 locomotive, #206
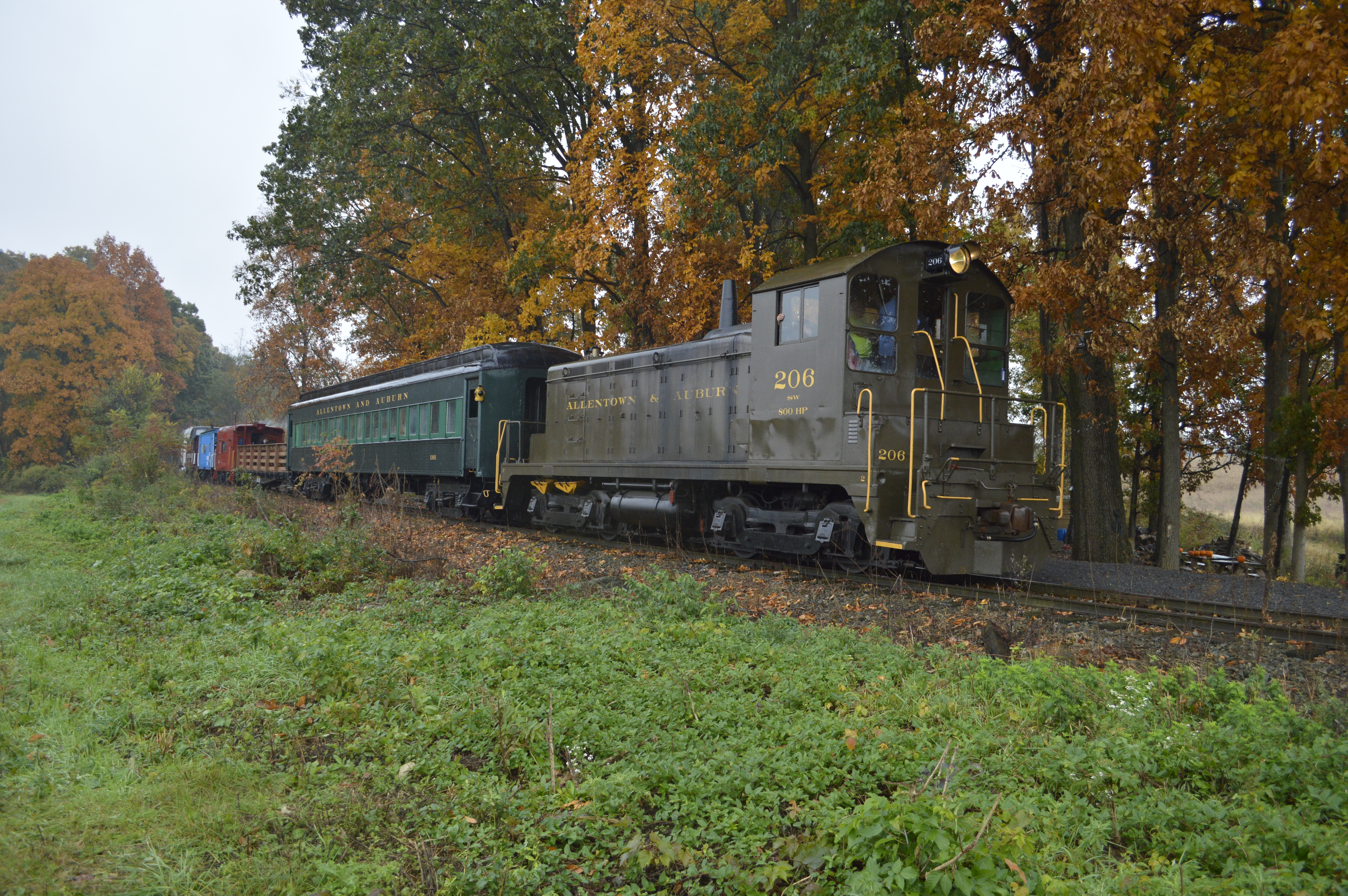
  Allentown and Auburn 206 arrives at Picnic Grove in October 2019.
6. Chicago and North Western: 1 locomotive #1201
7. Inland Steel: 3 locomotives, #43, 45-46
8. Chicago, Rock Island and Pacific Railroad: 29 locomotives, #500-#528
9. Great Lakes Steel: 2 locomotives, #6 and #7
10. Chicago, Burlington and Quincy Railroad: 6 locomotives, #9130-9135
11. Buffalo Creek Railroad: 2 locomotives, #40-41
12. Pennsylvania Railroad: 1 locomotive, #3908
13. Steelton and Highspire Railroad: 1 locomotive, #32
14. Lehigh Valley Railroad: 6 locomotives, #106-111
15. Patapsco and Back Rivers Railroad: 2 locomotives, #61-62
16. Missouri Pacific Railroad: 1 locomotive, #5 (UTSJ)
17. Minneapolis and St. Louis Railway: 1 locomotive, D838
18. Union Terminal Railway: 1 locomotive, #10 (UTSJ)
19. Baltimore and Ohio Railroad: 1 locomotive #2 (B&OCT)

Two SW locomotives survive, but neither retains the original Winton engine. PB&NE 206 was reengined with a 567CR block (R for counter-clockwise revolution) in 1955. The locomotive operated on both the Maryland & Pennsylvania Railroad (as #83) and Stewartstown Railroad (as #11). Since 2014, it has operated under its original #206 on the Allentown and Auburn Railroad in Kutztown, Pennsylvania. While it now has an EMD 567C block, it retains its EMC electrical system and early lifting hood vents.

Missouri Pacific #5 survives and operates as Thermal Belt Railway #1, repowered with a 600 hp (450 kW) Cummins diesel.

== 900 hp (670 kW) N series ==
These locomotives were all nearly identical, except for cast versus welded underframes. The 900 hp (670 kW) V12 Winton 201-A-engined NC and NW series locomotives can be distinguished from the less powerful 600 hp (450 kW) SC and SW because, although the underframes are identical, the hood on the N series is longer, leaving only a small amount of room before the front walkway. Many, but not all, N series locomotives have a short electrical box with sharp-angled corners in that location; this is easily distinguished by the lower, longer, rounded-cornered "satchel" of the SC and SW series. The other distinguishing feature from the S series is the central location of the twin exhaust stacks; the S series have them offset towards the engineer's left, because of the inline diesel engine.

=== Pre-NC ===
One experimental locomotive was built in March 1935 as a demonstrator, numbered EMC 518. It was assembled by Bethlehem Steel of Wilmington, Delaware. After demonstration purposes, it was sold to the Philadelphia, Bethlehem and New England Railroad in October as #203, later renumbered to 55; it was later sold to the Parrish Line Railway as their #10.

=== NC ===
Five NC locomotives were built. Some had General Electric electrical equipment, while others had Westinghouse, since EMC's own designs were not yet ready. This model did not have multiple unit equipment. They were:

1. EMC S/N 647:1 (built January 1938): Great Northern Railway #5101 (later #5300) rebuilt to an SW1200 in 1955.
2. EMC S/N 648:1 (built July 1937): Philadelphia, Bethlehem and New England Railroad #208.
3. EMC S/N 649:1 (built July 1937): Philadelphia, Bethlehem and New England Railroad #209.
4. EMC S/N 650 (built May 1937): Youngstown and Northern Railroad #201, to Elgin, Joliet and Eastern Railway #402 in April 1946, to Philadelphia, Bethlehem and New England #55, re-engined with an EMD 567 by PBNE
5. EMC S/N 651 (built May 1937): Youngstown and Northern Railroad #202, to Elgin, Joliet and Eastern Railroad #408 in April 1946, to Marinette, Tomahawk & Western Railroad #408, then finally to the Sabine River and Northern Railroad as #408 before being preserved in the National Museum of Transportation in St. Louis, Missouri.

=== NC1 ===
Five NC1 locomotives were built during March 1937, all with Westinghouse electrics. The only difference between models NC and NC1 was the fitting of multiple unit connections to the NC1, to enable multiple working. All were delivered to the Birmingham Southern Railroad, as EMC S/N 642-646, BSR #71-75.

=== NC2 ===
Two NC2 locomotives were built in July 1937 for the Missouri Pacific Railroad. They were functionally identical to the NC1; Pinkepank states EMC as recording, enigmatically, "Wiring" as the difference. They were EMC S/N 714 and 715, MP #4100 and 4101.

=== NW ===
Eight NW locomotives were constructed between September 1937 and December 1938. They were identical to the NC except for the EMC-built welded underframes. The first three were built as EMC S/N 725-727 for the Atchison, Topeka and Santa Fe Railway as their #2350-2352, later renumbered #2400-2402 and rebuilt into SW1200s in 1959. Two were constructed as S/N 728 and 729 for the Philadelphia, Bethlehem and New England Railroad as their #210 and 211, later renumbered as #53 and 54. Another two were built as S/N 730 and 731 for the Kansas City Terminal Railway as their #60 and 61. The final NW, S/N #732 was built for the Northern Pacific Railway as their #100. NP 100 was rebuilt to an SW900m in Jan 1957. It was in service on the Burlington Northern with same number and sold in 1983.

=== NW1 ===
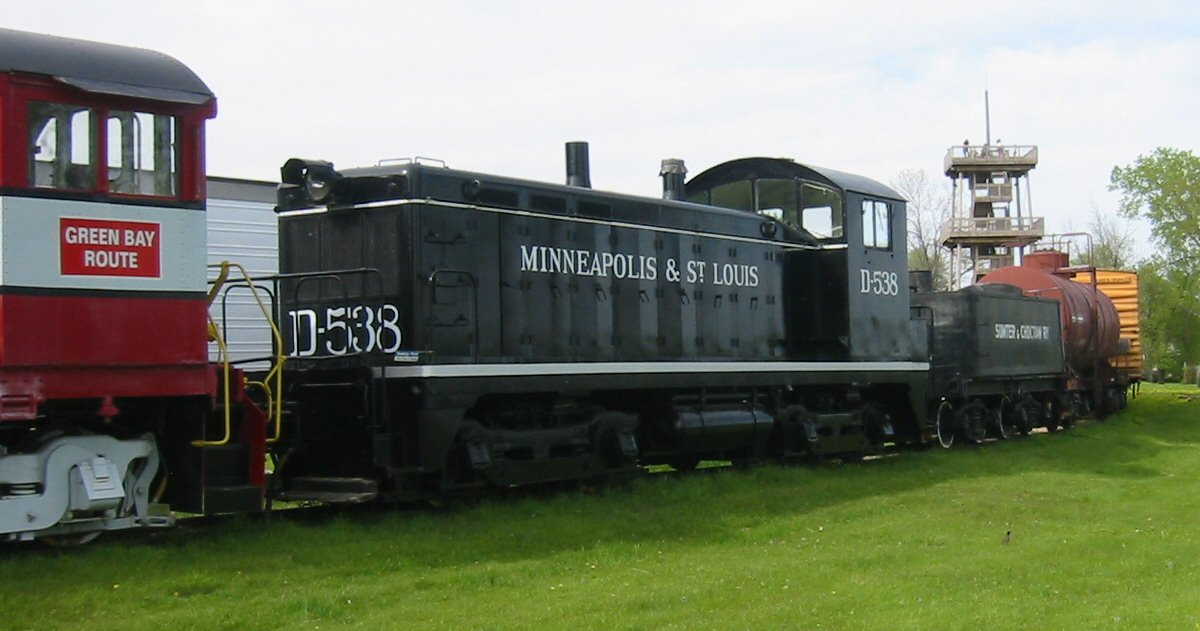
Minneapolis and St. Louis Railway locomotive D-538 at the National Railroad Museum.

The NW1 was the only 201-A-engined N series locomotive model to be ordered in any significant number; 27 were built between November 1937 and January 1939. It had a lengthened hood and no electrical box in front of it as in the other N series models. Electrical equipment was General Electric. Owning railroads were:

1. Elgin, Joliet and Eastern Railway: 2 locomotives, #400-401
2. Lehigh Valley Railroad: 11 locomotives, #120-130
3. Chicago, Burlington and Quincy Railroad: 2 locomotives, #9200-9201
4. Great Northern Railway: 1 locomotive, #5102 (rebuilt to an SW8 #101)
5. Chicago, Rock Island and Pacific Railroad: 8 locomotives, #700-707
6. Chicago and North Western Railway: 1 locomotive, #901
7. Minneapolis and St. Louis Railway: 2 locomotives, D538 (now preserved at the National Railroad Museum, Green Bay, Wisconsin) and D738

=== NW1A ===
The NW1A, of which only 3 were built, was equipped with EMC-built traction motors, although the generator was still a General Electric unit. All were built for the Soo Line: EMC S/N 841-843, SOO #2100-2102.

=== NW2 ===
The model wasn't Winton 201-A powered. See EMD NW2 for details of this model.

=== NW3 ===
The model wasn't Winton 201-A powered. See EMD NW3 for details of this model.

=== NW4 ===
The NW4, of which two examples were built for the Missouri Pacific Railroad, used the hood and cab configuration of the regular N-series, but with an additional straight section between cab and hood, mounted on a lengthened frame with large air tanks on the front platform, in front of the radiator. The additional hood section contained a steam generator; the NW4 was the first switcher so equipped, for switching passenger cars. The water tanks were mounted beneath the frame; the air tanks were therefore displaced to the front. The locomotives ran on AAR type B trucks re-used from EMC boxcab demonstrators #511 and 512. The two NW4s were EMC S/N 823 and 824, and were MP #4102 and 4103. They were scrapped in 1961.

=== NW5 ===
The model wasn't Winton 201-A powered. See EMD NW5 for details of this model.

=== T ===
The solitary EMC transfer locomotive classified T was built in May 1936 for the Illinois Central Railroad as their No. 9201, but soon renumbered as 9202. The bodywork was built by St. Louis Car Company and the electrical equipment was by General Electric. The main frame rested on two subframe bolsters which were articulated together; the four two-axle trucks were mounted to the bolsters, giving it a B-B+B-B wheel arrangement. The locomotive was a center-cab design, with twin hoods extending in both directions, each containing a V12 Winton 201-A diesel engine of 900 hp (670 kW), giving 1,800 hp (1,300 kW). The locomotive's main underframe sagged over time, and was returned to EMD for straightening and gusseting for extra strength. The locomotive was scrapped in 1950.

== See also ==
- List of GM-EMD locomotives
