= NW3 =

NW3 may refer to:

- London NW3, a postcode area in England
- EMD NW3
- National Waterway 3, India
