= Southern Railway of British Columbia =

Canadian short line railway branded as SRY Rail Link

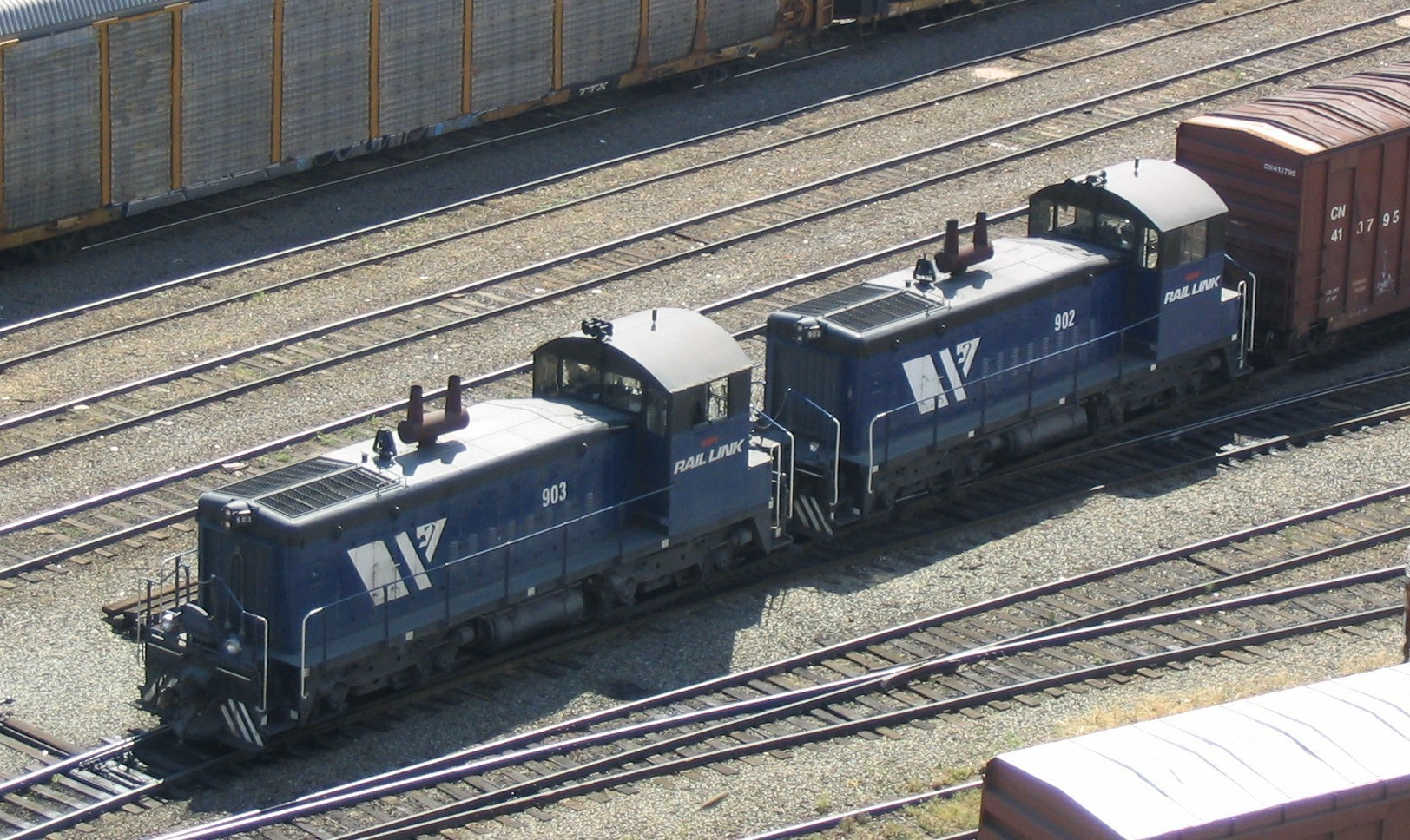
- A pair of Southern Railway of British Columbia SW900

Overview
- Headquarters: New Westminster, BC, Canada
- Reporting mark: SRY
- Locale: Vancouver Island and Lower Mainland, British Columbia
- Dates of operation: 1989–
- Predecessor: British Columbia Electric Railway

Technical
- Track gauge: 1,435 mm (4 ft 8 1/2 in) standard gauge
- Length: 132 mi (212 km)

Other
- Website: Southern Railway

The Southern Railway of British Columbia, branded as SRY Rail Link (reporting mark SRY) is a Canadian short line railway operating in southwestern British Columbia. The main facility is the port at Annacis Island with major import of cars, export of forestry products, and other shipments. The railway has interconnections with three Class I railroads, including Canadian Pacific Kansas City (CPKC), Canadian National (CN) and Burlington Northern Santa Fe (BNSF). SRY operates 29 locomotives, mostly consisting of EMD (8) GP-9 locomotives, (3) MP15 locomotives, and (12) SW900 locomotives. SRY also currently rosters 2 SD38-2s, 1 SD38AC and 1 SD35. Additionally, SRY formerly rostered 4 GMD1s. The railroad also operates a fleet 2,000 rail cars, hauling approximately 65,000 carloads annually. SRY operates around 123 miles (198 km) of track, 62 miles (100 km) of which is mainline track. SRY operates in New Westminster, British Columbia, and runs on the Fraser Valley Subdivision to Chilliwack, British Columbia.

== History ==
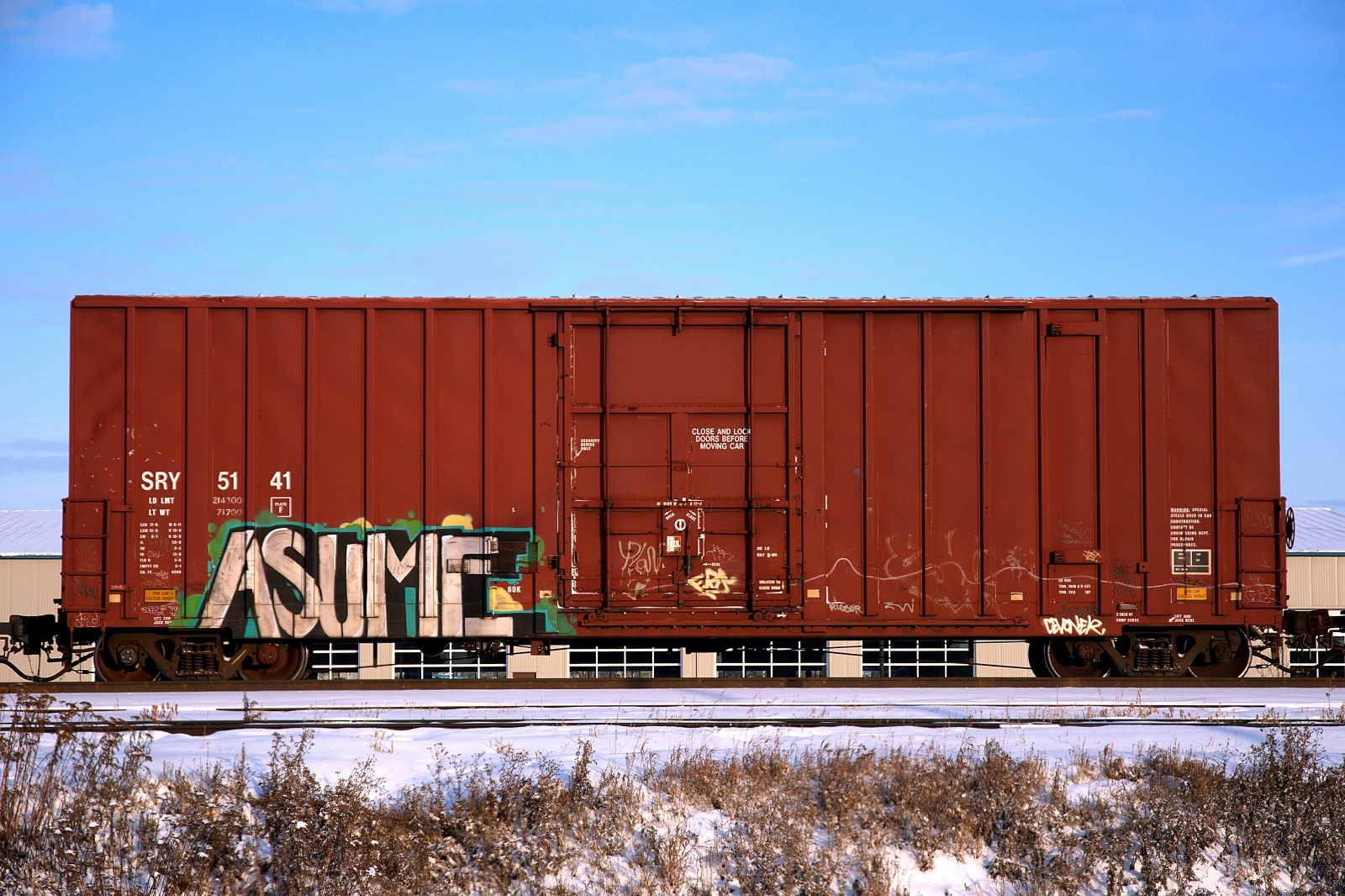
SRY boxcar

The Government of British Columbia sold the railway to the Itel Rail Group in 1988. The railway was renamed the Southern Railway of British Columbia. The line was originally built in 1910 as the British Columbia Electric Railway (BCER), an interurban trolley service for passengers (until 1950s) as well as for freight such as farm produce. The railway was taken over by Crown corporation BC Hydro in 1961, and was known as the BC Hydro Railway. In 1988 freight rights, rolling stock and rails were sold to Itel of Chicago with protected passenger rights at no cost. In 1994, it was bought by Washington Group International but kept the SRY name. The Washington Group has since merged with URS. To this day the provincial government and BC Hydro retain the right to reintroduce passenger service. In recent years, with congestion and growing environmental concerns, there has been increasing demand for this service, and willingness to pay, from persons wishing to travel among Fraser Valley communities other than by private automobile. In 2019, the South Fraser Community Rail campaign was being launched, promoted by former BC premier Bill Vander Zalm and former Langley mayor Rick Green, to resurrect passenger service to Chilliwack using the former BCER right-of-way. The proposed light-rail line would be 103 km (64 miles) long.

== See also ==
- Southern Railway of Vancouver Island, a sister system to SRY.
