= EMD RS1325 =

American locomotive model

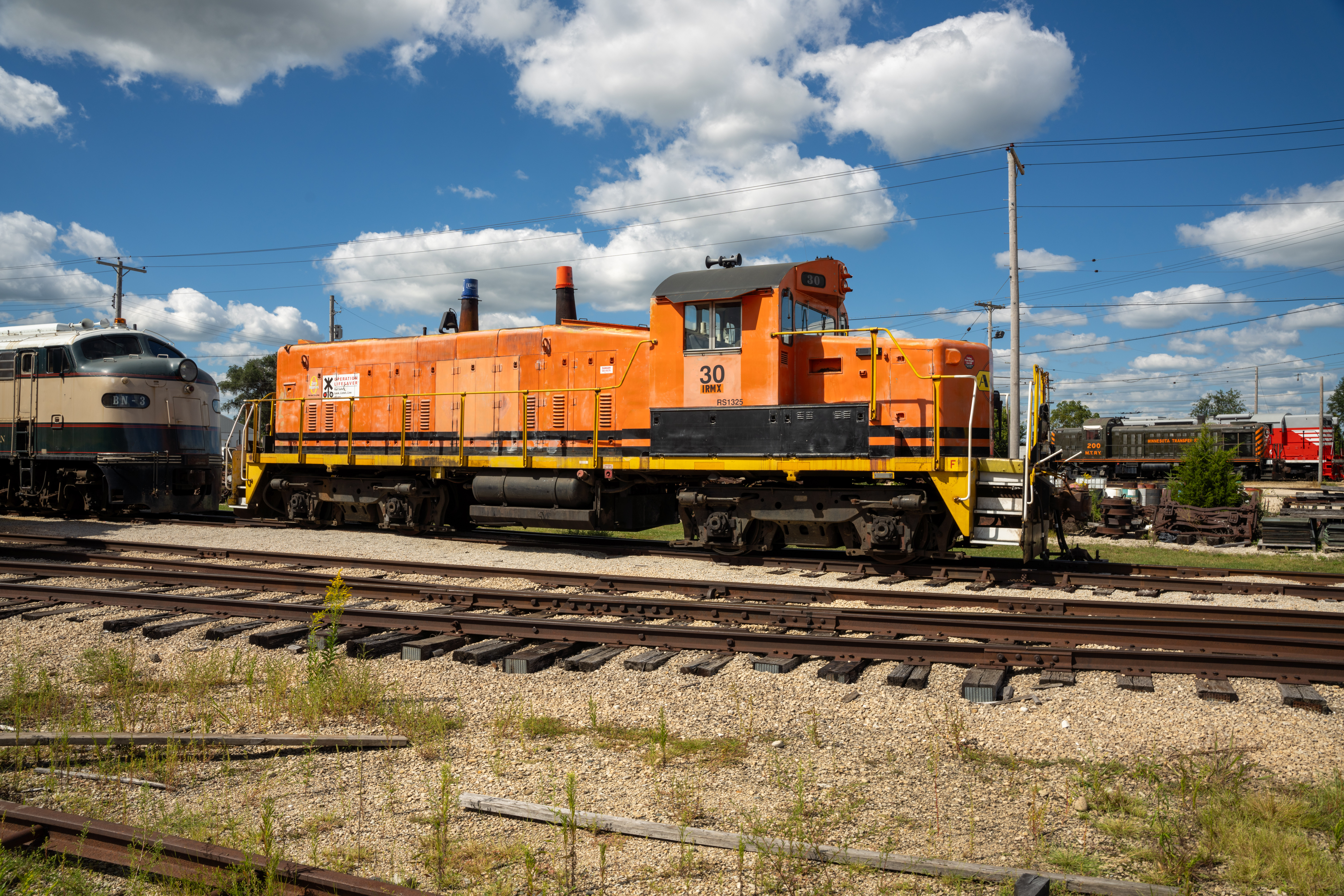
Type and origin
- Power type: Diesel-electric
- Builder: Electro-Motive Division
- Build date: 1960
- Total produced: 2
Specifications
- Configuration
  - AAR: B-B
- Gauge: 4 ft 8 1/2 in (1,435 mm) standard gauge
- Trucks: Flexicoil
- Wheel diameter: 40 in (1.016 m)
- Length: 52 ft 2 in (15.90 m)
- Width: 10 ft 6 7/8 in (3.22 m)
- Height: 14 ft 7 in (4.45 m)
- Loco weight: 125 short tons (113 t; 112 long tons)
- Fuel capacity: 900 US gallons (3,400 L; 750 imp gal)
- Prime mover: EMD 12-567D1
- Engine type: V12 diesel
- Cylinders: 12
Performance figures
- Power output: 1,325 hp (0.988 MW)
Career
- Withdrawn: 2020
- Disposition: Both examples preserved.

The RS1325 is a North American locomotive model built by Electro-Motive Division, having characteristics of both a switcher locomotive and a road switcher locomotive. Only two units were built.

In 1960, EMD built a pair of light road switcher locomotives, consisting of switcher carbodies and mechanicals on longer roadswitcher frames. These were given the designation of RS1325, RS denoting a roadswitcher not part of a specific series, and 1325 denoting the unit's horsepower. The RS1325's were 4-axle, B-B diesels constructed by GM-EMD in September 1960. The cab and forward is styled similarly to that of the SW7, SW9 or SW1200 with a long sloping hood and the standard rounded top cab of the time. The long hood is low and more representative of a true switcher body. They had, similarly to the NW5 switchers, a short hood that could contain auxiliaries and a steam generator for passenger equipment, as EMD intended for them to be purchased as passenger switchers. However, the only two built lacked such amenities, as they were purposefully built for freight service.

Only two units were produced in total, serial numbers 25773 and 25774. They made up order #4438, placed by the Chicago & Illinois Midland Railway, and they were given the numbers #30 and #31 in service. A green paint scheme with a thin red stripe adorned them until the C&IM was renamed as the Illinois & Midland Railroad when they were bought by Genesee & Wyoming and added to the G&W's ever-increasing roster of shortlines. 25774 (#31) was last in service with Illinois and Midland, but in June 2016, 25773 (#30) was transferred to the Atlantic & Western Railway. In 2020, #31 was acquired by the Monticello Railway Museum, and in 2022, #30 was donated to the Illinois Railway Museum, arriving in June 2023.

== See also ==
- List of GM-EMD locomotives
