= EMD SW1504 =

Type of diesel-electric locomotive

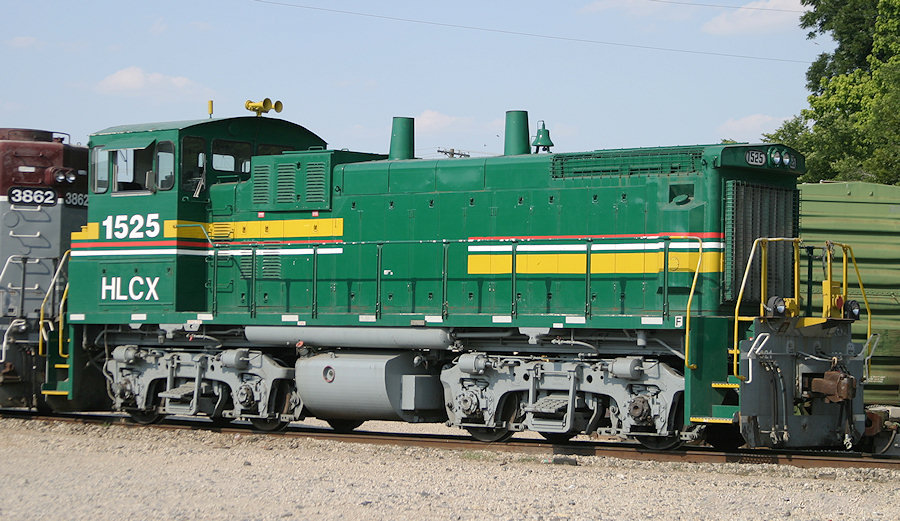
- HLCX 1525
Type and origin
- Power type: Diesel
- Builder: General Motors Electro-Motive Division (EMD)
- Model: SW1504
- Build date: May 1973 – August 1973
- Total produced: 60
Specifications
- Configuration
  - AAR: B-B
- Gauge: 4 ft 8 1/2 in (1,435 mm)
- Length: 46 ft 8 in (14.22 m)
- Loco weight: 248,000 lb (112,000 kg)
- Fuel capacity: 600–1,000 US gal (2,300–3,800 L; 500–830 imp gal)
- Prime mover: EMD 12-645E
- Engine type: V12 2-stroke diesel
- Aspiration: Roots blower
- Displacement: 9,072 in^{3} (149 L)
- Cylinders: V12
- Cylinder size: 9.5 in × 10 in (240 mm × 250 mm)
- Transmission: Main generator: D32, traction motors: D77/78DC
- Loco brake: Straight air
- Train brakes: Air
Performance figures
- Power output: 1,500 hp (1,119 kW)
Career
- Locale: when new: Mexico

The EMD SW1504 is a 1,500 hp (1,119 kW) diesel-electric switcher locomotive built by General Motors' Electro-Motive Division. The type was sold only to Mexico's national railroad, Ferrocarriles Nacionales de México; 60 examples were built between May and August 1973. With the breakup of NdeM, the locomotives have been passed to the variety of successor railroad operators in Mexico; some have been sold to leasing companies in the USA.

== Original buyers ==
Railroad	Quantity	Road numbers	Notes
Nacionales de México	60	8800–8859	
Total	60		

== See also ==
- List of GM-EMD locomotives
