= EMD GT22CUM-1 =

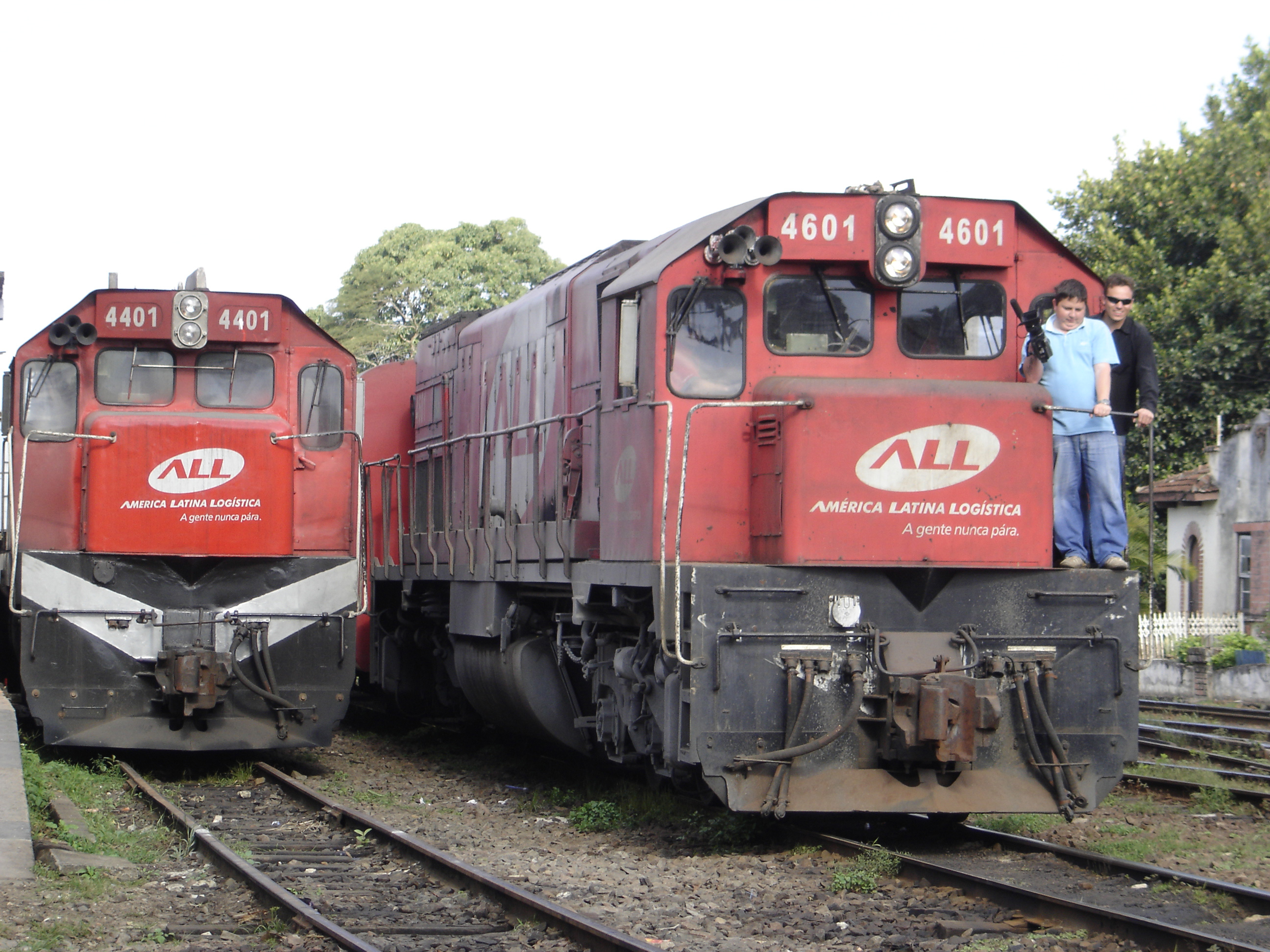
Type and origin
- Power type: Diesel-electric
- Builder: General Motors Electro-Motive Division
Specifications
- Configuration
  - AAR: C-C
  - UIC: Co'Co'
- Gauge: 1,000 mm (3 ft 3 3/8 in)
- Loco weight: 108 metric tons
- Cylinders: 12
Performance figures
- Maximum speed: 100 km/h (60 mph)
- Power output: 2,250 hp
Career
- Locale: South America

The EMD GT22CUM1 is a narrow gauge diesel-electric locomotive built by EMD. It has six axles in two trucks, giving it a C-C wheel arrangement. The name means a C-C locomotive, U for metre gauge (the rails are a metre apart), 12-cylinder 645 series. They were built for service in South America by the Villares with license of EMD. The Rede Ferroviaria Federal Sociedade Anonima (RFFSA) a state railroad in Brazil bought about 55 in the early 1980s in order to expand their locomotive roster. The RFFSA needed a powerful single-engined locomotive with light weight per axle for their metric system, and the GT22 represented the highest-rated model that EMD had to offer at the time.

The model name "GT22CUM1" deconstructs as follows:

- G - general Use
- T - turbo charged
- 22 - 12-cylinder 645E diesel engine
- C - C-C wheel arrangement
- U - metrical gauge
- M1 - model 1

== See also ==
- EMD GT22CUM-2
