= EMD NW5 =

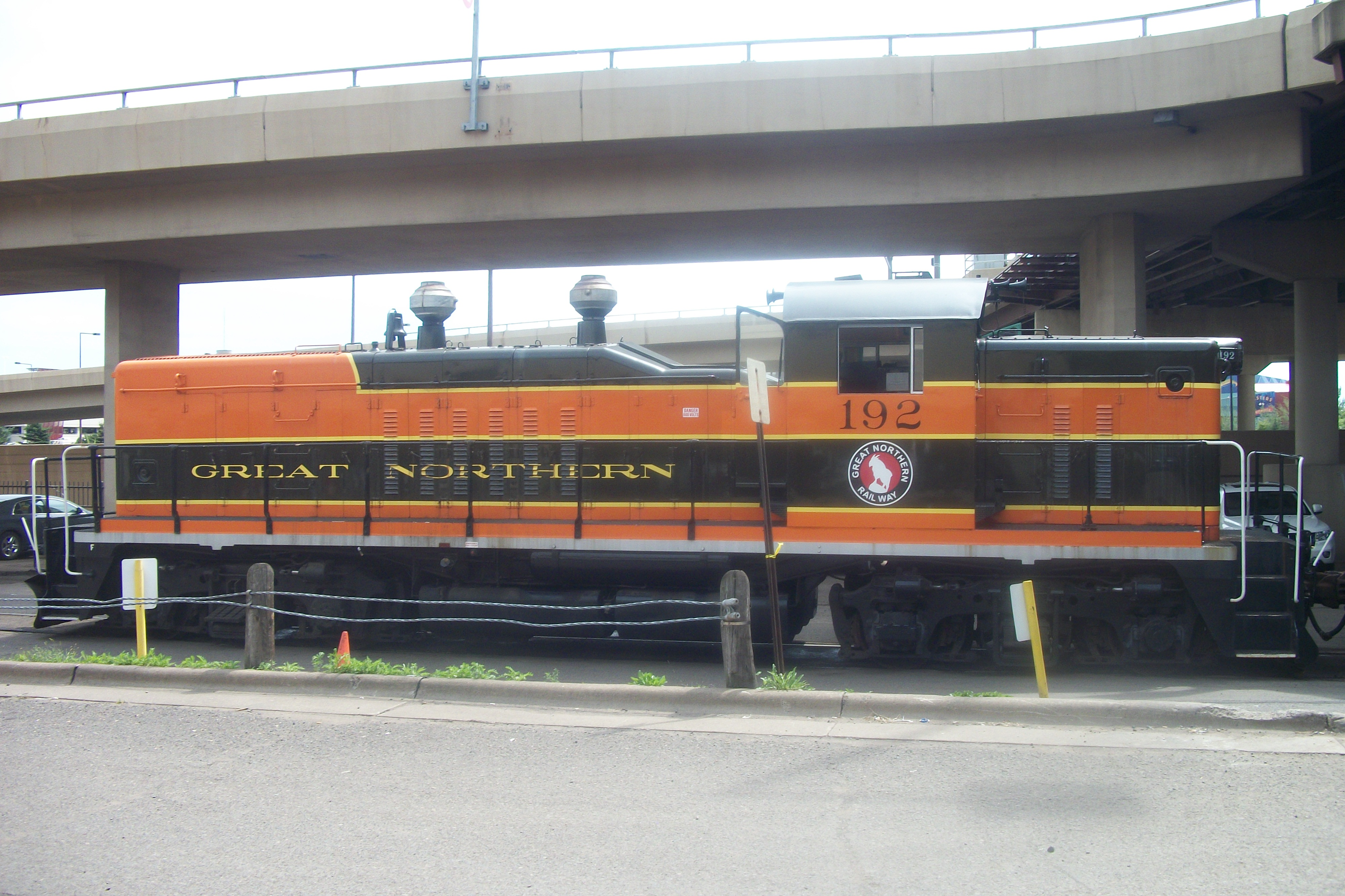
- GN 192 is preserved at the Lake Superior Railroad Museum
Type and origin
- Power type: Diesel-electric
- Builder: General Motors; Electro-Motive Division
- Model: NW5
- Build date: December 1946 – February 1947
- Total produced: 13
Specifications
- Configuration
  - AAR: B-B
- Gauge: 4 ft 8 1/2 in (1,435 mm)
- Trucks: Blomberg B
- Prime mover: EMD 12-567B
- Engine type: V12 diesel
- Cylinders: 12
- Loco brake: Straight air
- Train brakes: Air
Performance figures
- Power output: 1,000 hp (750 kW)

The EMD NW5 is a 1,000 hp (750 kW) road switcher diesel-electric locomotive built by General Motors Electro-Motive Division of La Grange, Illinois between December 1946 and February 1947.

A total of 13 were produced, of which the majority (ten locomotives) went to the Great Northern Railway. A further two were delivered to the Union Belt of Detroit (though lettered "Fort Street Union Depot") as their #1 and #2, one of which is still in existence today at the Florida Gulf Coast Railroad Museum. The final locomotive was sold to the Southern Railway where it became #2100.

== Description ==
The NW5, like the NW3 that preceded it, is basically an EMD NW2 switcher hood, prime mover (a V12 EMD 567 diesel engine) and main generator on a stretched frame and riding on road trucks (the standard EMD Blomberg B design).

Large, road-sized fuel and water tanks were fitted between the trucks under the frame. The NW5 design was also fitted with a steam generator to heat passenger cars. The NW3 had this fitted in an extended cab and extended hood section, and the NW5 had a standard EMD switcher cab about three-quarters of the way down the frame, above the inboard axle of the rear truck, and a fairly high short hood on the other side to house the steam generator.

== Similarity to Alco design ==
This was fundamentally identical to what ALCO had done to create the successful RS-1 design—fitting a switcher long hood and cab on a stretched frame and road trucks, with a short hood on the other side for the steam generator—and the NW5 can be seen as EMD's answer to the RS-1.

However, EMD were seemingly not very keen on producing road switchers at the time; Hayden speculates that the small profit and small numbers were not appealing, and that only when the prospects of high sales became more obvious did they place much interest in the concept.

== Original buyers ==
Railroad	Quantity	Road numbers	Notes
Great Northern Railway	10	186–195	to Burlington Northern 986–995
Southern Railway	1	2100	to Mass Central 2100
Union Belt of Detroit (“Fort Street Union Depot”)	2	1–2	FSUD #2 on display at Florida Railroad Museum, out of service.
Total	13		

== Subsequent history ==
Historically, railroads had not realized much profit on local and branchline service, and therefore were unwilling to spend much on equipment for them; most were handed down from more prestigious service.

All ten Great Northern units survived to the Burlington Northern Railroad merger. In BN service, the initial '1' of their numbers was replaced by a '9', and they were repainted into the railroad's green and black scheme. #989 burned in 1978 and was retired, but all other locomotives survived until withdrawal from BN service in 1982; this was a service life of 35 years for their first owners. Most were scrapped at this point.

- GN #186 was sold to the Colorado and Eastern Railroad and subsequently to the Denver Terminal Railway, both times keeping its BN number of 986. This unit was subsequently owned by the Denver Rock Island Railroad. The president of the DRIR has confirmed that the locomotive left DRIR possession and was scrapped around 1996.
- GN #187 was sold to Pacific Transportation Services as #1001; it was subsequently sold to Repco as their #187, then to the Molalla Western Railway under the same number, then to related East Portland Traction; the two latter systems merged into the Oregon Pacific Railroad in 1997. This locomotive was scrapped in 2013, after heavy vandalism.
- GN #189, which had burned, was rebuilt by the Diesel Electric Service Corporation and entered service with Phoenix Steel under its BN number of 989. It was retained when Phoenix Steel became CitiSteel, and was scrapped in October 1993.
- GN #190 was sold to the Colorado & Eastern and then subsequently to the Kyle Railroad, keeping its BN number of #990.
- GN #192 was sold to the Colorado & Eastern and passed from there to the Kyle Railroad, then to the Iowa Southern Railroad. Today it is in service in Duluth, Minnesota for the North Shore Scenic Railroad and resides at the Lake Superior Railroad Museum.
- GN #194 was sold to the Great Western Railway, then to the Council Bluffs Railroad, later scrapped. The hood of which is still in existence at a scrap yard in Council Bluffs, Iowa.
- SOU #2100 now works for the Massachusetts Central Railroad.
- Fort Street Union Depot #2 was sold to Mississippi Export RR. Renumbered #61. Now on static display at the Florida Railroad Museum in Parrish, Florida.

== See also ==
- List of GM-EMD locomotives
