= EMD BL20-2 =

Diesel locomotive produced by EMD

Type and origin
- Power type: Diesel-electric
- Builder: Electro-Motive Diesel
- Build date: May 1992 - August 1992
- Total produced: 3
Specifications
- Configuration
  - AAR: B-B
- Gauge: 4 ft 8 1/2 in (1,435 mm) standard gauge
- Length
  - Over body: 56 ft 2 in (17.12 m)
- Loco weight: 250,000 lb (110,000 kg)
- Prime mover: EMD 16-567
- Alternator: AR10
- Traction motors: D77
- Cylinders: 16
Performance figures
- Power output: 2,000 hp (1.5 MW)
Career
- Disposition: All 3 in service

The EMD BL20-2 is a model of diesel electric locomotive produced by Electro-Motive Diesel in 1992. The locomotives were designed as rebuilds of the EMD GP9 with the addition of new technology, including an alternator and electronics equivalent to those of the Dash 2 line of locomotives. Despite the BL prefix, these locomotives were unrelated to the earlier EMD BL2.

EMD produced three BL20-2 demonstrators numbered 120–122, but no customers could be found for the model, which was competing in a saturated rebuilt locomotive market. The three demonstrators remain in service as part of a locomotive leasing company run by GATX and EMD's leasing division.
