= EMD GT22 Series =

American locomotive

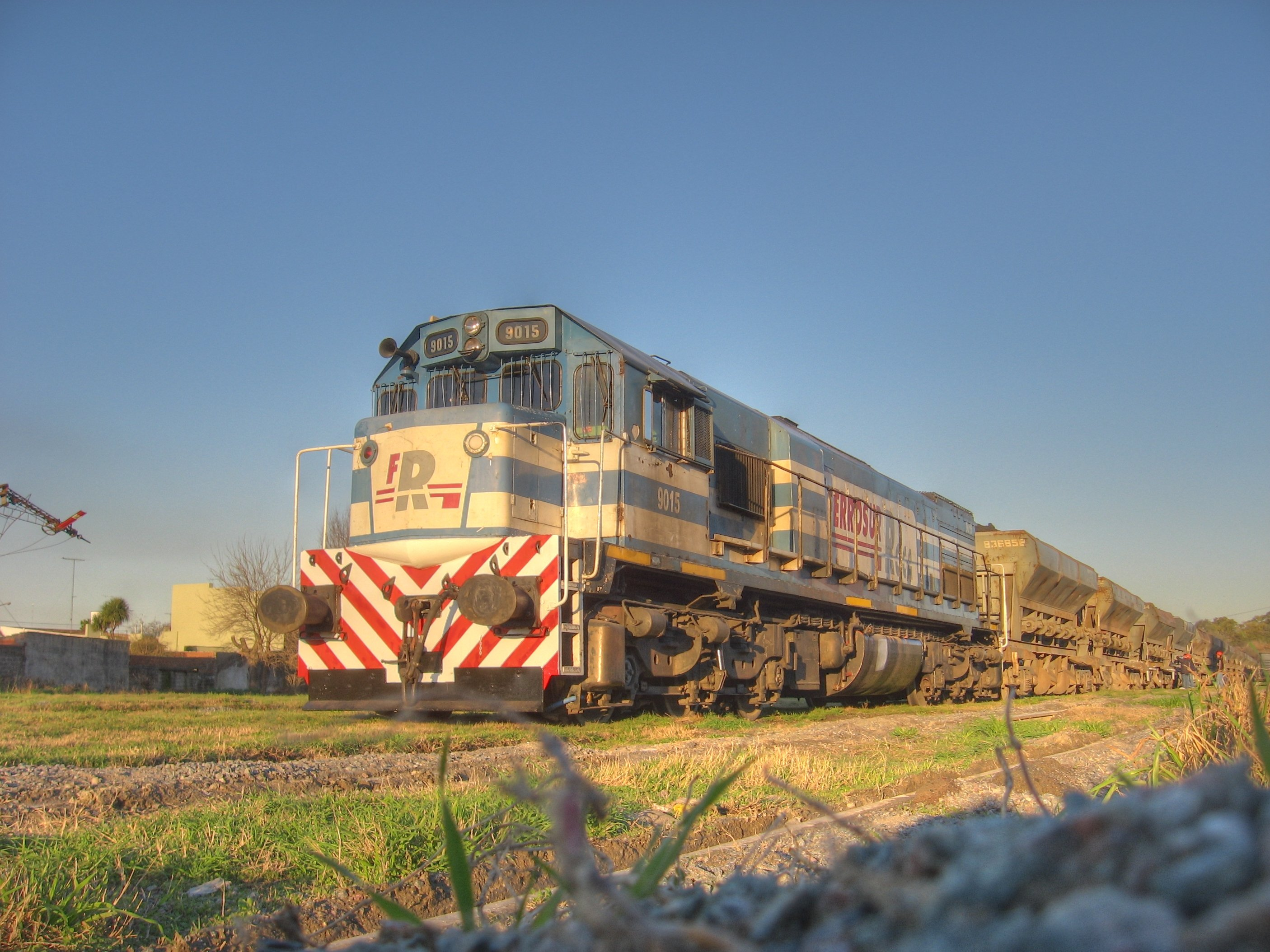
- Ferrosur Roca GENERAL MOTORS-Astarsa GT22CW #9015 by Astarsa transporting empty coal hoppers.
Type and origin
- Power type: Diesel–electric
- Builder: Astarsa, Đuro Đaković, Equipamentos Villares S.A., Electro-Motive Division, General Motors Diesel & Henschel & Sohn GmbH
- Model: GT22CW, GT22CU, GT22CW-2, GT22HW-2, GT22CUM-1, GT22CUM-2, GT22LC & GT22LC-2
- Build date: June 1972 - December 1997
- Total produced: 455
Specifications
- Configuration
  - AAR: C-C & A1A-A1A (GT22HW-2)
  - UIC: Co'Co' & (A1A)(A1A) (GT22HW-2)
- Gauge: 5 ft 6 in (1,676 mm); 4 ft 8 1/2 in (1,435 mm); 3 ft 6 in (1,067 mm); 1,000 mm (3 ft 3 3/8 in)
- Wheel diameter: 40 inches (1,000 mm)
- Wheelbase: 11 ft 11 in (3.63 m) between bolsters; 6 ½' ft (1.98 m) between axles in each truck
- Length: 57 ft (17,000 mm) over the coupler pulling faces
- Width: 9 ft 3 in (2.82 m) over the grabirons
- Height: 13 ft 2.5 in (4.026 m)
- Loco weight: 107 tons (107,752 kg)
- Fuel capacity: 1,700 - 3,000 US gal (6434 - 11,355 L)
- Prime mover: EMD 12-645E3
- Engine type: V12 - 45 Deg
- Aspiration: Turbocharged - Intercooler
- Generator: Alternator AR10 & D14
- Traction motors: EMD D 77 B
- Loco brake: Westinghouse - WXOV - 26 LAV
Performance figures
- Maximum speed: 65 - 93 MPH (105 - 150 km/h)
- Power output: 2,475 HP (1845 kW) - 2,250 HP in coupler
Career
- Nicknames: "Stretch", "Karavela/Mala Karavela" (GT22HW-2)
- Locale: Algeria, Argentina, Brazil, Botswana, DR Congo, Ivory Coast, Mali, Mozambique, Nigeria, Saudi Arabia, Senegal, Yugoslavia & Zimbabwe

The EMD GT22 Series were first introduced in 1972 after the rise in popularity of six axle locomotives. The GT series now carried a turbocharger that increased the horsepower depending on customer input. The GT series also utilized six axle HTC Trucks, which allowed the locomotive to haul heavier loads at slower speeds with minimal wheelslip.

The GT22C series also gave itself various individual designations depending on customer input. Standard suffixes after the model designation were either a U or W suffix to indicate the type of traction motors. A C generally indicated six axle trucks but due to a six axle locomotive being too oversized for most second and third world countries, EMD developed the L suffix to indicate the locomotive was constructed with a Lightweight frame. EMD Dash 2 electronics also became a popular choice for the export railroads by the late 1970s.

These designations could apply to any kind of export locomotive design of EMD or another licensee of EMD as long as the electrical & mechanical gear was left unaltered.

== Overview ==
With the introduction of the 645 engine for export models in 1967, the model designation numbers changed by adding 10 to the designation of a similar model (For example: the G12 now became the G22). To meet customer demands of a six axle version of the popular G12, EMD created the GR12 which was slightly longer and taller to accommodate the Type-C trucks.

EMD then designed the GT22 model to accommodate the HT-C truck first found on the American EMD SD45X. Extending the carbody and increasing the fuel tank capacity, the GT22C series was introduced. Production spanned longer than the four axle G22 version, but with smaller orders.

Several models were introduced:

- GT22CW
- GT22CU
- GT22CW-2
- GT22HW-2
- GT22CUM-1/-2
- GT22LC
- GT22LC-2
- GT22MC

== GT22CWP ==
The EMD GT22CWP was first appeared in 1972 and now carried a CW suffix which indicated that this model had six axles (C) and traction motors that could fit from 1,435 mm (4 ft 8 1/2 in) standard gauge to 5 ft 6 in (1,676 mm) gauge tracks (W). Another new suffix introduced to this model was the T, which indicated the use of a turbocharger, "P" stands for Passengers.

The GT22CWP found most of its popularity in Argentina, while two unusual orders went to the Saudi Railways Organization in Saudi Arabia & the Société Nationale des Transports Ferroviaires of Algeria.

Production spanned from July 1972 to February 1988

EMD GT22CW Orders
Builder	Country	Railroad	Quantity	Road Numbers	Notes
GMD	Algeria	Société nationale des chemins de fer algériens	25	060DH1 - 060DH25	DH series built by GM
EMD & ASTARSA	Argentina	Ferrocarriles Argentinos	79	9001 - 9064, 9201 - 9215	9001 - 9025 & 9201 - 9215 built by EMD, 9026 - 9064 built by ASTARSA
EMD	Saudi Arabia	Saudi Railways Organization	3	2001–2003	

== GT22CU ==
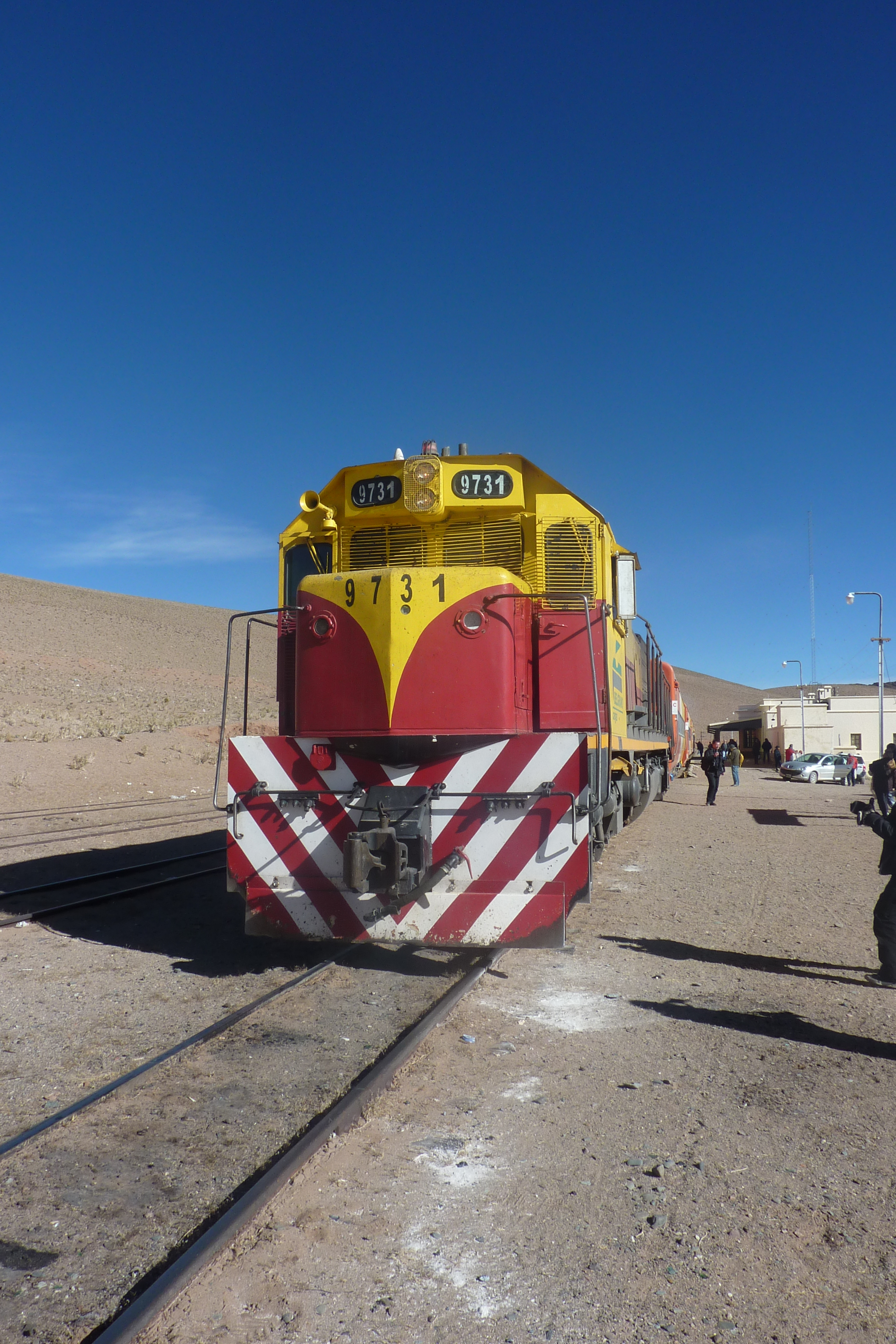
GT22CU in San Antonio de los Cobres, Argentina

The EMD GT22CU was first appeared in 1972. Designed mainly for the narrow gauge market, the GT22CU now carried a CU suffix which indicated that this model had six axles (C) and traction motors that could fit from one meter to 5 ft 6 in (1,676 mm) gauge tracks (U). Another new suffix introduced to this model was the T, which indicated the use of a turbocharger.

The GT22CU was purchased by the Ferrocarriles Argentinos from June 1972 to January 1980.

EMD GT22CU Orders
Builder	Country	Railroad	Quantity	Road Numbers	Notes
EMD & ASTARSA	Argentina	Ferrocarriles Argentinos	54	9701 - 9754	9701 - 9720 built by EMD, 9721 - 9754 built by ASTARSA

== GT22CW-2 ==
The EMD GT22CW-2 was first appeared in 1988 and now carried a CW suffix which indicated that this model had six axles (C) and traction motors that could fit from Standard Gauge rails to 5 ft 6 in (1,676 mm) gauge tracks (W). Another new suffix introduced to this model was the T, which indicated the use of a turbocharger. Finally, this model now carried the popular EMD Dash 2 electronics which improved its reliability.

The GT22CW-2 found most of its popularity in Argentina and even after the breakup of Ferrocarriles Argentinos, did the successors of that company continued to purchase more GT22CW-2s.

Production spanned from March 1988 to December 1997.

EMD GT22CW-2 Orders
Builder	Country	Railroad	Quantity	Road Numbers	Notes
ASTARSA	Argentina	Ferrocarriles Argentinos	25	9065 - 9089	
EMD	Argentina	San Martín Line	5	A913 to A917	Gauged to 5 ft 6 in (1,676 mm) 12-645E3C - Build date 1997
EMD	Argentina	Roca Line	10	A908 to A912 & A918 to A922	Gauged to 5 ft 6 in (1,676 mm) 12-645E3C - Build date 1997
HDRS	South Korea	Hyundai Cement Company	1	Numberless	Built by Hyundai Rolling Stock Co., later known as Hyundai Precision (Present day successor is: Hyundai Rotem)

== GT22HW-2 ==
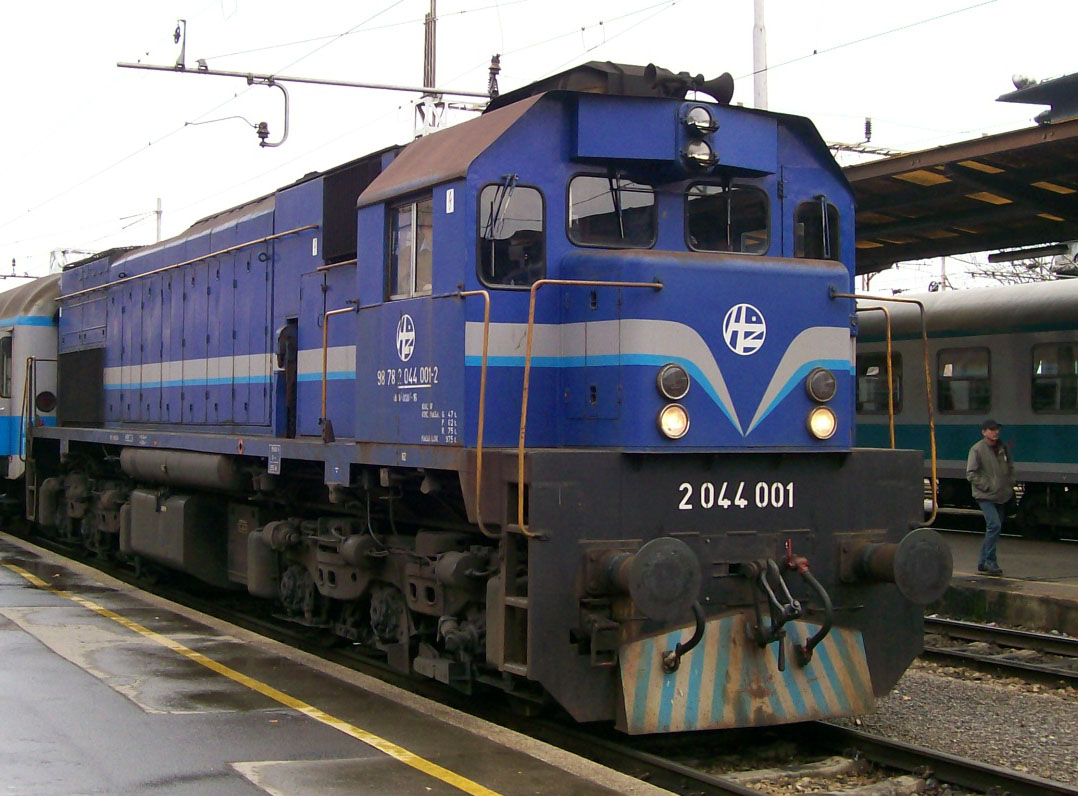
Hrvatske Željeznice ĐĐ GT22HW-2 #2044.001

The GT22HW-2 was a departure from the standard production of the GT22 Series as it was a custom model designed to meet the conditions of Yugoslavia. This multipurpose locomotive was introduced with a turbocharger (T), Head End Power (H) for passenger use and EMD Dash 2 Electronics (-2), with an A1A-A1A axle arrangement. Due to the locomotive's compact appearance, the length was shortened by 1.25 feet (380 mm) from a normal GT22CW-2. Thirty four of these locomotives were manufactured by Đuro Đaković between February 1981 and August 1984. Since Yugoslavia had various languages arising from the ethnicities in the country, the locomotives were given four different lettering variations:

EMD GT22HW-2 Orders
Builder	Country	Railroad	Quantity	Road Numbers	Notes
Đuro Đaković	Yugoslavia	Yugoslav Railways	34	645.001 - 645.034	.001 - .030 are lettered JUGOSLAVENSKE ŽELJEZNICE (Croatian).031 - .032 are lettered ЈУГОСЛОВЕНСКЕ ЖЕЛЕЗНИЦE (Serbian Cyrillic).033 - .034 are lettered JUGOSLOVENSKE ŽELEZNICE - HEKURUDHAT JUGOSLLAVE (Serbian Latin/Albanian)

== GT22CUM-1/-2 ==
First introduced in January 1982, the GT22CUM series were locomotives were a powerful single-engined locomotive with light weight per-axle. Designed exclusively for the RFFSA by Equipmentos Villares S.A., the GT22CUM now carried a CU suffix which indicated that this model had six axles (C) and traction motors that could fit from one meter to 5 ft 6 in (1,676 mm) gauge tracks (U). Two custom designations were introduced for this locomotive: M for meter gauge (1,000 mm / 3 ft 3 3/8 in) and -1/-2 to indicate a Type 1 or Type 2 model.

- The Type 1 Model is distinguished by not including an air reservoir on both sides of the carbody.
- The Type 2 Model is distinguished by an extended nose and an air reservoir on both sides of the carbody.

Production spanned from January 1982 to May 1986.

EMD GT22CUM-1/GT22CUM-2 Orders
Builder	Country	Model	Railroad	Quantity	Road Numbers	Notes
EVSA	Brazil	GT22CUM-1	Rede de Viação Paraná-Santa Catarina (RFFSA)	30	2501–2530	
EVSA	Brazil	GT22CUM-1	Viação Férrea do Rio Grande do Sul (RFFSA)	22	6451 - 6472	
EVSA	Brazil	GT22CUM-2	Rede Ferroviária Federal Sociedade Anônima (RFFSA)	10	4653 - 4662	

All subsidiaries of the RFFSA were consolidated in 1983 with the introduction of the SIGO System by the federal government.

== GT22LC ==
When most second and third world railroads couldn't operate standard EMD GT22s due to their weight, EMD introduced the GT22LC; which is the same as a GT22C, but now incorporated with a much lighter (L) frame to handle harsher conditions than normal while still equipped with a turbocharger. Due to the lightweight frame, the U or W suffixes no longer applied as the locomotive was designed to handle any rail gauge the locomotive is applied to.

Production spanned from February 1985 to August 1986.

EMD GT22LC Orders
Builder	Country	Railroad	Quantity	Road Numbers	Notes
GMD	Botswana	Botswana Railways	20	D013 - D032	
GMD	DR Congo	Société Nationale des Chemins de Fer du Congo	8	CC501 - CC508	Paint scheme is the same as the SNTF GT22CW order

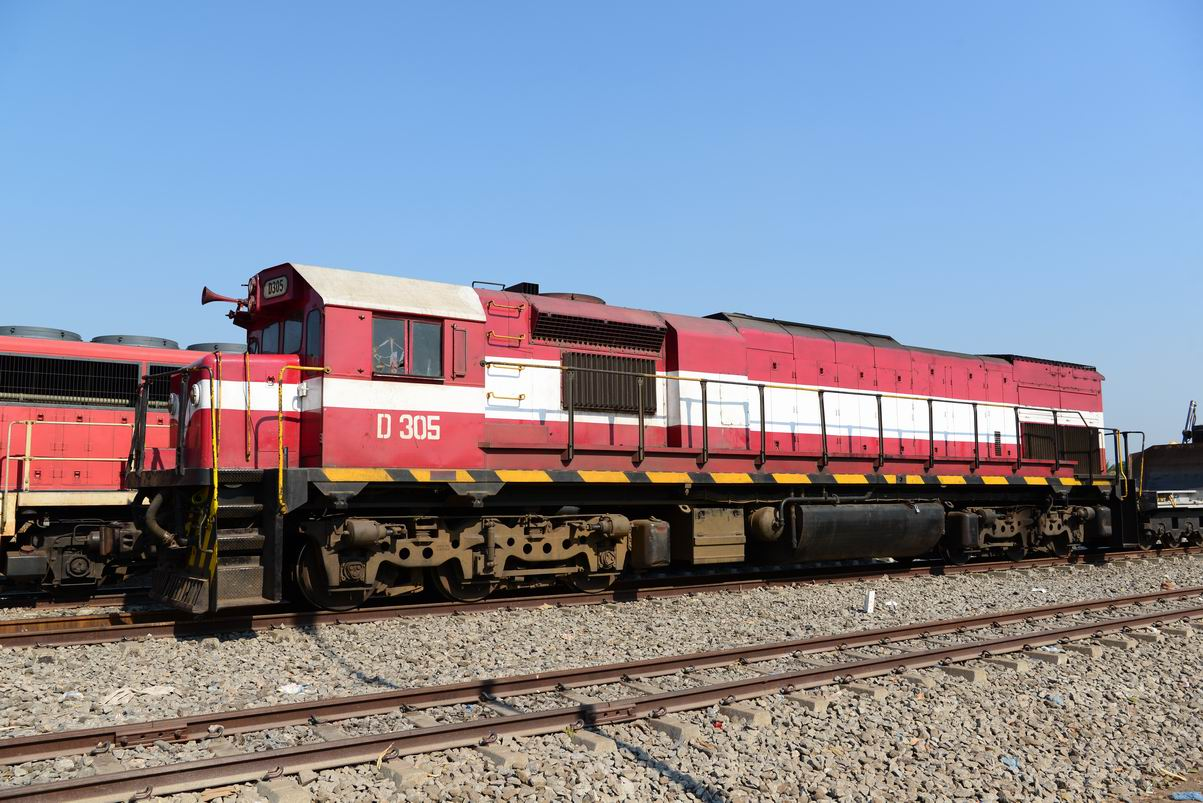
Loco D-305 (Typ GT22LC-2) at 23. August 2018 in station Caia (Mozambique)

== GT22LC-2 ==
Basically the same as the GT22LC, the GT22LC-2 now added EMD Dash 2 Electronics while still retaining a turbocharger. Due to the Lightweight frame, the U or W suffixes no longer applied.

Production spanned from November 1981 to November 1996.

EMD GT22LC-2 Orders
Builder	Country	Railroad	Quantity	Gauge	Road Numbers	Notes
GMD	Ivory Coast	Régie des Chemins de Fer Abidjan-Niger	25	1,000 mm (3 ft 3 3/8 in)	CC2201 - CC2225	Generally lettered RAN
GMD	Mali	Régie du Chemin de fer du Mali	8	1,000 mm (3 ft 3 3/8 in)	CC2283 - CC2290	
GMD	Mozambique	Portos e Caminhos de Ferro de Moçambique	10	1,067 mm (3 ft 6 in)	D301 - D310	Equipped with modern-day Cowcatchers
Henschel & Son	Nigeria	Nigerian Railway Corporation	10	1,067 mm (3 ft 6 in)	1901–1910	
EMD	Senegal	Société d'Exploitation Ferroviaire des ICS (Indistruies Chimiques du Sénégal)	4	1,000 mm (3 ft 3 3/8 in)	2461–2464	
EMD & GMD	Senegal	Société Nationale des Chemins de fer du Sénégal	11	1,000 mm (3 ft 3 3/8 in)	CC2476 - CC2477 & CC2481 - CC2489	CC2476, CC2477 & CC2481 - CC2484 built by GMD & CC2484 - CC2489 built by EMD
EMD & GMD	Zimbabwe	National Railways of Zimbabwe	61	1,067 mm (3 ft 6 in)	1001–1061	1001 - 1035 built by EMD & 1036 - 1061 built by GMD

== See also ==
- List of GM-EMD locomotives
- List of GMD Locomotives

== Sources ==
- Electro-Motive Division Export GM Models
- Astilleros Argentinos Rio de la Plata S.A. GM Export Models
- Henschel und Sohn GmbH GM Export Models
- Đuro Đaković GM Export Models
- Equipamentos Villares S.A. GM Export Models
- General Motors Diesel Division Export Models
- GM GT22CU/GT22CW Data Sheet
- pt:EMD G22CU EMD G22CU Article in Portuguese.
