= EMC 1800 hp B-B =

Locomotive class

EMC 1800 hp B-B locomotives
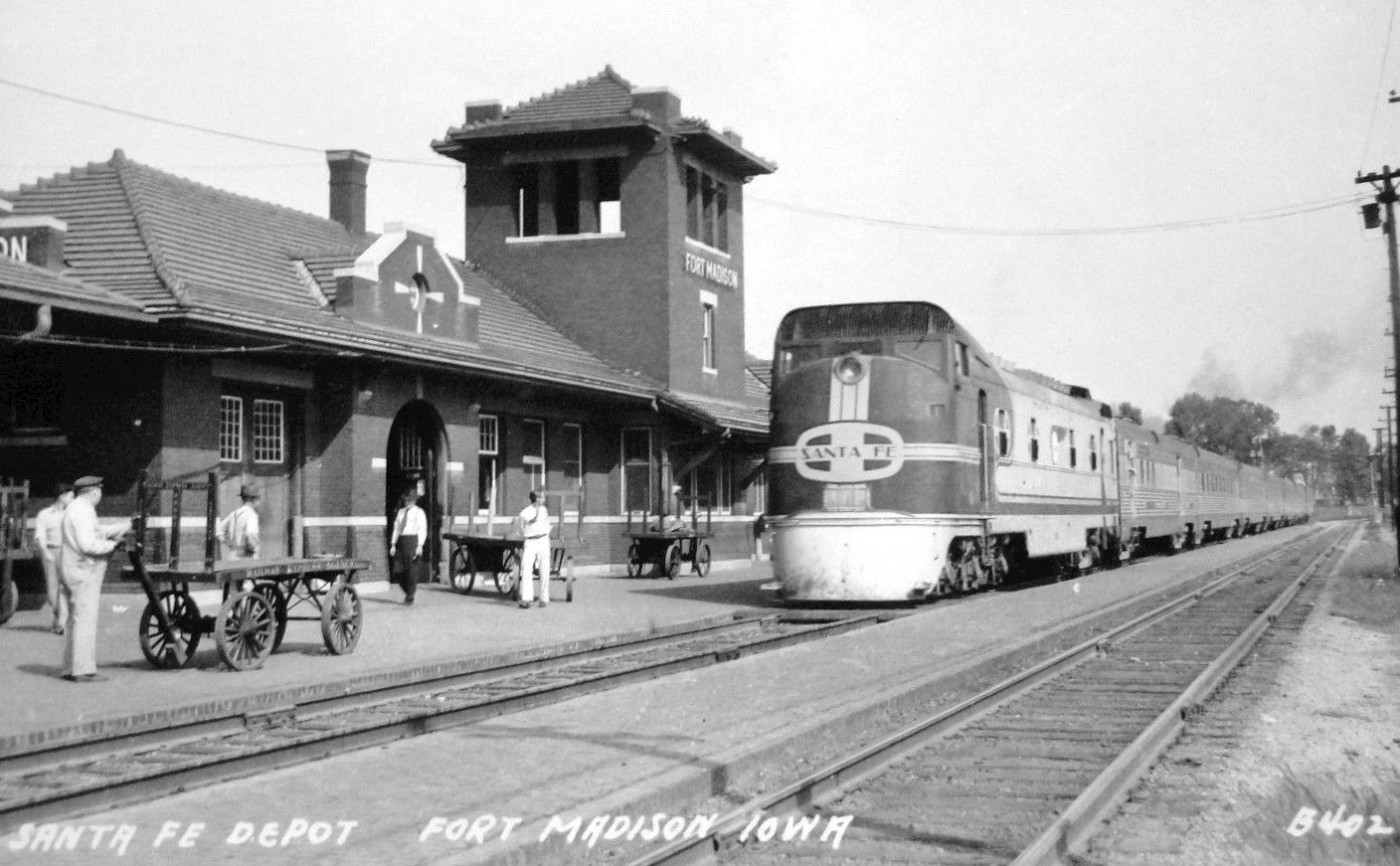
- Postcard of the Santa Fe's No. 1 locomotive after rebuild
Type and origin
- Power type: Diesel-electric
- Builder: Electro-Motive Corporation
- Model: 1935
- Total produced: 5
Specifications
- Configuration
  - AAR: B-B
- Fuel type: Diesel
- Prime mover: Winton 201-A (two)
- Engine type: V12 diesel
- Cylinders: 12
- Transmission: Diesel-electric
- Loco brake: Westinghouse
- Train brakes: Westinghouse
Performance figures
- Power output: 1,800 hp (1,342.26 kW)
Career
- Locale: North America
- Disposition: One preserved, remainder scrapped

Electro-Motive Corporation (later Electro-Motive Division, General Motors) produced five 1800 hp B-B experimental passenger train-hauling diesel locomotives in 1935; two company-owned demonstrators, #511 and #512, the Baltimore and Ohio Railroad's #50, and two units for the Atchison, Topeka and Santa Fe Railway, Diesel Locomotive #1. The twin engine power unit layout and multiple unit control systems developed with the B-B locomotives were soon adopted for other locomotives such as the Burlington Route's Zephyr locomotives built by the Budd Company in 1936 and EMC's own EMD E-units introduced in 1937. The B-B locomotives worked as proof-of-concept demonstrators for diesel power with the service loads of full size trains, breaking out of its niche powering the smaller custom Streamliners.

In 1935, EMC was just starting to switch from a design and marketing company to a locomotive-building company, and could not yet produce the locomotives it designed. Construction of carbodies for EMC demonstrators #511 and #512, and B&O #50 was therefore subcontracted to General Electric's factory in Erie, Pennsylvania, and AT&SF #1 to St. Louis Car Company. Like most boxcabs, they initially had control cabs at both ends, a feature that would rarely be repeated in North American locomotives, although it would become common elsewhere. Power was provided by twin 900 hp (670 kW) 12 cylinder Winton 201-A diesel engines in each power unit, exceeding by 50% the most power that could be attained with a single engine at that time. The added "headroom" in power extended the life of mechanical parts, which was a critical issue with early diesel engines in locomotives. The units were built with AAR type B two-axle trucks. As development design locomotives, modifications were frequently made to them to overcome various teething problems; the EMC demonstrators spent considerable time in aluminum paint substituting for the units under modification.

== EMC demonstrators 511 and 512 ==
EMC Demonstrators
- EMC demonstrator #511 on the Chicago, Burlington and Quincy Railroad in 1937. The locomotive is painted silver, to serve as a backup for CB&Q's Zephyr and AT&SF's Super Chief locomotives.
Type and origin
- Power type: Diesel-electric
- Builder: General Electric (EMC design)
- Serial number: 511–512
- Build date: August 1935
- Total produced: 2
Specifications
Career
- Numbers: 511–512
- Official name: 1800 hp B-B
- Locale: North America
- Disposition: Scrapped

The two EMC demonstrators, numbered 511 and 512, were built in August 1935 to demonstrate the future of passenger diesel power to potential customers. The boxy bodywork was not what EMC intended to sell, but it was an easy way to demonstrate the power units and hauling capacity, which would not be changed in the future E-units.

They were demonstrated both together and singly; the latter for shorter trains for local and less busy services, the former to replace larger steam locomotives on heavier trains. These units were highly significant in pioneering multiple unit connections which could be quickly connected and disconnected in the field, allowing units to be "lashed up" into more powerful combinations (operated by a single crew) at will, and allowing malfunctioning units to be replaced with fresh units with ease.

EMC #512, painted silver, was added to the ATSF locomotive #1 cab/booster pair to help pull the first regular run of the streamlined, Budd Company-built Super Chief on May 18, 1937, after the EMC E1 pair 2/2A built for the train burned out some of their traction motors on a record-breaking exhibition run days before.

In 1938, having outlived their usefulness, the two demonstrators were scrapped. Trucks and some other components were re-used for the two EMC NW4 switchers built for the Missouri Pacific Railroad.

== Baltimore & Ohio 50 ==
Baltimore & Ohio #50
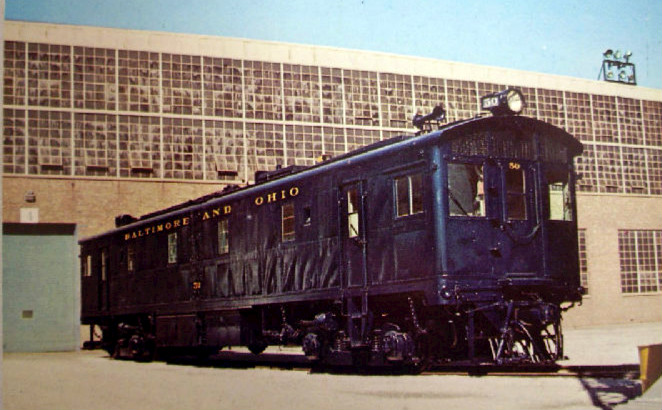
- In 1972 at the EMD plant for EMC/EMD's 50th anniversary celebration
Type and origin
- Power type: Diesel-electric
- Builder: General Electric (EMC design)
- Serial number: 532
- Build date: August 1935
- Total produced: 1
Specifications
Career
- Operators: Baltimore and Ohio Railroad; Chicago and Alton Railroad; Gulf, Mobile and Ohio Railroad
- Numbers: B&O 50; C&A 50; GM&O 1,200
- Official name: 1800 hp B-B
- Locale: North America
- Current owner: National Museum of Transportation, St. Louis, Missouri
- Disposition: Museum artifact

Baltimore and Ohio Railroad #50 was fundamentally identical to demonstrators 511 and 512 when delivered. In this form, it hauled the first Diesel-powered Royal Blue until the introduction of the EMC EA/EB units in 1937.

Following that, it had a semi-streamlined "shovel nose" applied to one end, and transferred to the B&O-owned Chicago and Alton Railroad to haul the Abraham Lincoln. When the Alton left B&O control in the merger that created the Gulf, Mobile and Ohio Railroad, #50 entered the GM&O roster as #1200. After the Second World War, the shovel-nose treatment was removed, restoring the unit to its prior boxcab appearance. The locomotive was placed into local freight and passenger service until it was retired, upon which it was donated to the National Museum of Transportation, St. Louis, Missouri, where it remains.

== Santa Fe 1 ==
AT&SF 1
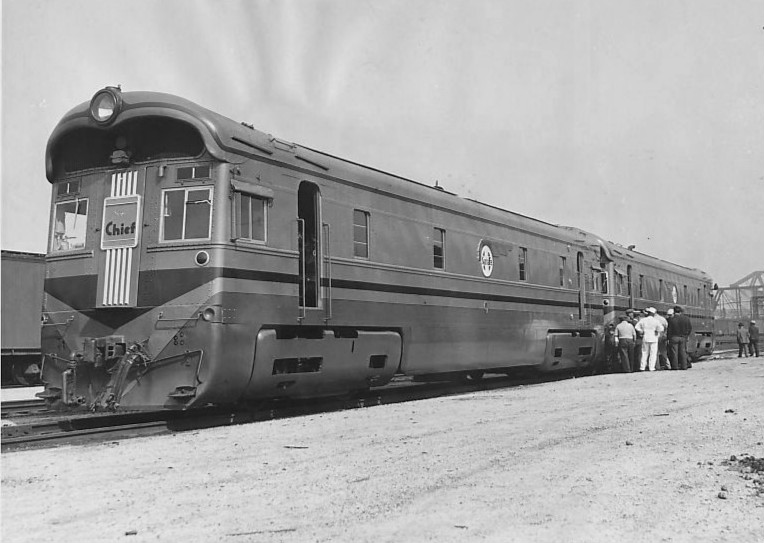
- The two units of Atchison, Topeka and Santa Fe Railway Diesel locomotive #1, photographed in Chicago on August 31, 1935
Type and origin
- Power type: Diesel-electric
- Builder: St. Louis Car Company (EMC design)
- Serial number: 535–536
- Build date: August 1935
- Total produced: 2
Specifications
Career
- Operators: Atchison, Topeka and Santa Fe Railway
- Numbers: 1
- Official name: 1800 hp B-B
- Nicknames: Amos and Andy
- Locale: North America
- Scrapped: 1953
- Disposition: scrapped

Atchison, Topeka and Santa Fe Railway #1 was a twin-unit set built by St. Louis Car Company in August 1935 to haul the Santa Fe's new train, the Super Chief, for its first year of operation from May 12, 1936, until May 18 of the following year.

The Santa Fe Railway was an ideal railroad to be a dieselization pioneer; its long desert runs in the Southwest made the provision of water supplies for steam locomotives problematic. Santa Fe saw the potential for rapid dieselization of its southwestern passenger service so the railroad asked for two locomotives like the EMC demonstrators as proof of concept, letting the railroad gain some experience with diesel operation before production model diesel locomotives and the lightweight, streamlined trains they would haul were ready. The 2226.6 mile route that these units were intended to run, covering mountain and desert, was completely unprecedented, and exposed weaknesses in the design. Their working up period extended for about eight months before they were introduced into service, during which time modifications were continually made to them.

Santa Fe asked for some cosmetic "dressing up" of the locomotives, since they would be hauling a prestige passenger train, and EMC obliged with a treatment by Sterling McDonald's GM styling department, which included large hooded air intakes at the front of the units and a striking paint scheme: Olive Green with Cobalt Blue and Sarasota Blue stripes separated by pinstripes of Crimson and Tuscan Red. This livery reduced the boxiness of the locomotives and gave them more of a look of speed.

The units were delivered with shrouding around their trucks, which was soon removed because the bearings on the trucks tended to run hot. Engine cooling was another problem that needed to be addressed during the testing period. The second unit in particular had trouble getting enough air to cool the radiators; likely the stylish hood over the air intake contributed to this problem. A number of vents were added to the roofs in their first year of existence. Both units required larger steam generators, and a greater fuel and water supply.

Because they were always run coupled together, Santa Fe employees nicknamed the two units the "One Spot Twins" and "Amos & Andy" (after the popular radio situation comedy). Both units shared a common road number and the operating department considered them a single locomotive. The mechanical department referred to them as "Unit A" (lead unit) and "Unit B" (trailing unit). While the pair substituted for a Super Chief E1 set with burned-out traction motors in 1937, the company leased EMC demonstrator #512 as a third unit called "Unit C".

After new EMC E1s replaced the proof-of-concept #1 in 1937, the Santa Fe began to further modify the two locomotive units. The two units were rebuilt as single-ended locomotives in 1938 with a "bulldog" front end — a very high, raised cab above a rounded snub nose. The locomotives were painted in the Warbonnet paint scheme similar to the E1s. The trucks were replaced with three axle drop-equalizer trucks of unusual AAR wheel arrangement 1B configuration; the lead axle was unpowered, while the two rear axles were powered. The three-axle trucks were more stable at speed and lighter on the track with a lower axle loading. Roller bearings on the new trucks alleviated the overheating problem. "Unit A" retained road number 1 and "Unit B" was renumbered number 10, since it was now regarded as a separate locomotive. The revamped locomotives pulled the new Chicagoan (ATSF train) and Kansas Cityan named trainsets between Chicago and Wichita, KS, with the run soon extended to Oklahoma City.

In 1941, No. 10 had its cab removed, and became a booster unit numbered 1A. In 1948, AT&SF rebuilt unit 1A into freight transfer locomotive No. 2611 running on EMD Blomberg B trucks; locomotive 1 remained unmodified from its 1938 rebuild as a passenger unit.

Both 1 and 2611 went to Electro-Motive Division as trade-ins on EMD E8 locomotives in 1953. Both emerged as booster units, numbered 83A and 84A, respectively.
