= EMD SD38AC =

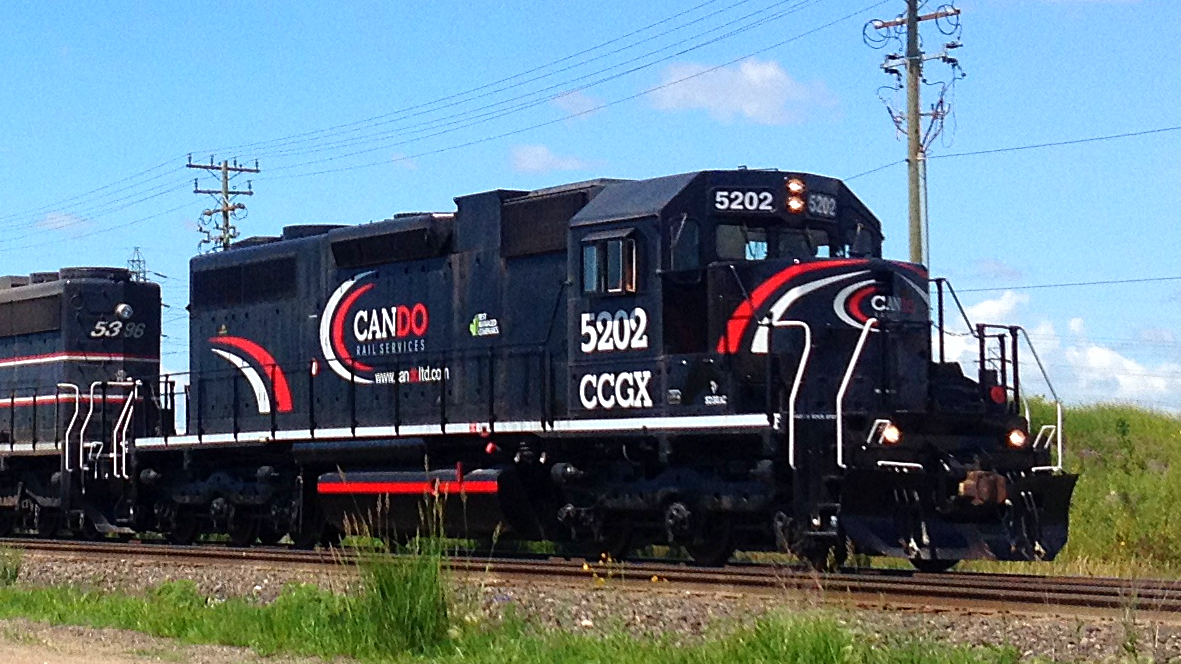
Type and origin
- Power type: Diesel-electric
- Builder: General Motors Electro-Motive Division (EMD)
- Model: SD38AC
- Build date: June – October 1971
- Total produced: 15
Specifications
- Configuration
  - AAR: C-C
- Gauge: 4 ft 8 1/2 in (1,435 mm) standard gauge
- Fuel capacity: 3,200 US gal (12,000 L; 2,700 imp gal)
- Prime mover: EMD 16-645E
- Engine type: V16 diesel engine
- Cylinders: 16
Performance figures
- Power output: 2,000 hp (1,500 kW)
Career
- Locale: North America

An EMD SD38AC is a 6-axle diesel-electric locomotive built by General Motors Electro-Motive Division between June and October 1971. This model is an SD38 with an AR10 alternating current alternator instead of the SD38's normal direct current generator. It produces 2,000 horsepower (1,500 kW) from a 16-cylinder EMD 645E roots blown prime mover. It came equipped with or without dynamic brakes. This locomotive shares a common frame with the SD38, SD39, SD40 and SD45. The SD38AC was a transition between the SD38 and its successor, the SD38-2. 15 examples of this model were built; 6 for B&LE, 8 for DMIR and one for BC Hydro.

== Original owners ==
Railroad	Quantity	Road numbers
Bessemer and Lake Erie Railroad	6	864-869. 866,867,868 are the last 3 SD38AC's on A Class 1 Railroad and 868 is the last one working in its home territory. 866 works in Chicago and 867 works on the former Duluth, Missabe and Iron Range Railway. All three are owned by the Canadian National Railway.
Duluth, Missabe and Iron Range Railway	8	201-208
BC Hydro	1	381
Totals	15	
