= EMD NW3 =

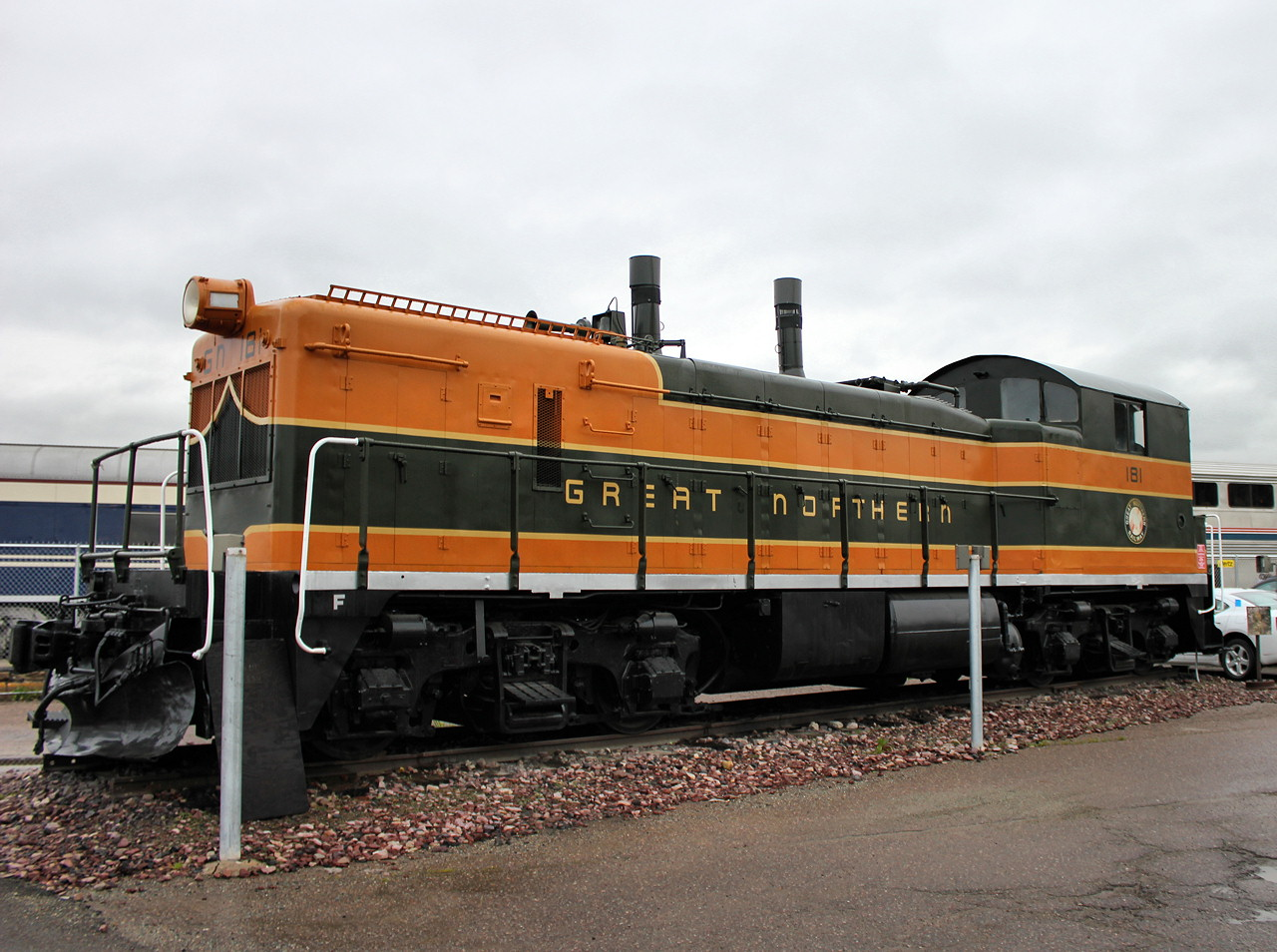
- 181 at Whitefish in 2013.
Type and origin
- Power type: Diesel Electric
- Builder: Electro-Motive Division
- Model: NW3
- Build date: November 1939 – March 1942
- Total produced: 7
Specifications
- Configuration
  - AAR: B-B
  - UIC: Bo'Bo'
- Gauge: 4 ft 8 1/2 in (1,435 mm)
- Trucks: Blomberg B
- Prime mover: EMD 12-567
- Engine type: V12 Two-stroke diesel
- Aspiration: Roots blower
- Cylinders: 12
- Loco brake: Straight air
- Train brakes: Air
Performance figures
- Maximum speed: 80 mph (129 km/h)
- Power output: 1,000 hp (750 kW)
Career
- Operators: Great Northern Railway
- Numbers: 5400–5406; later 175–181
- Retired: 1965–1968
- Disposition: One preserved, remainder scrapped

The EMD NW3 was a 1,000 hp (750 kW) diesel-electric road switcher locomotive built by General Motors Electro-Motive Division of La Grange, Illinois between November 1939 and March 1942. A total of seven were built for the Great Northern Railway, the sole original purchaser; they were originally numbered #5400-5406 and later renumbered #175-181.

The locomotive fundamentally consists of an NW2 hood, prime mover (a V12 EMD 567 diesel engine) and main generator on a long frame with road trucks (Blomberg Bs). The extra length was used for a large cab and an additional, full-width hood section, which contained a steam generator for passenger service. The boiler's exhaust was in the front center of the cab, between the front windows and exiting at the middle of the roof front.

The locomotives were delivered in GN's black diesel paint scheme of the time, but were later repainted in the bright, orange and green "Empire Builder" scheme. The short exhaust stacks as delivered were at some point replaced by standard conical EMD switcher stacks.

The first four locomotives were traded in by GN to EMD on new locomotives in 1965. The remaining three locomotives were sold to other railroads: #179 was sold to A.E. Staley Co. of Morrisville, Pennsylvania, keeping the same number; then locomotive #179 was purchased by Locomotive Trouble Shooters, from Fairless Hills, PA 19030 and the engine was replaced, #180 was sold to the Clinchfield Railroad as their #361; #181 went to Anaconda Aluminum as their #100. The Clinchfield locomotive was scrapped; the Anaconda Aluminum unit is on display at the Whitefish, Montana depot in its GN "Empire Builder" colors, locomotive #179 was still in service in Morrisville, Pennsylvania until 2019 when it was scrapped.

== See also ==
- List of GM-EMD locomotives
