= EMD SD40 =

North American diesel-electric locomotive

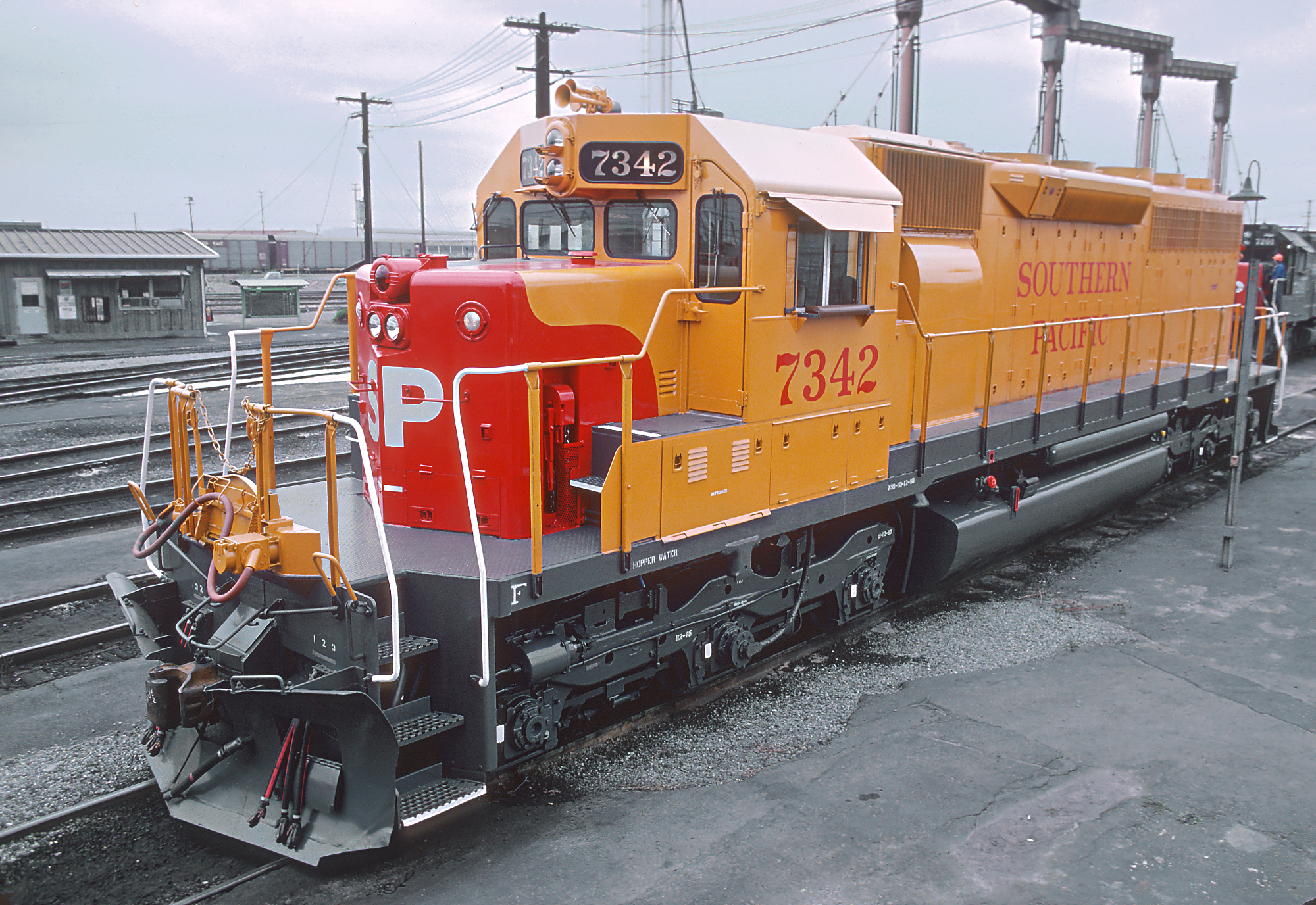
- Southern Pacific 7342, an SD40R, in 1980
Type and origin
- Power type: Diesel-electric
- Builder: GM Electro-Motive Division (EMD); General Motors Diesel (GMD)
- Model: SD40
- Build date: January 1966 – August 1972
- Total produced: 1,268
Specifications
- Configuration
  - AAR: C-C
- Gauge: 4 ft 8 1/2 in (1,435 mm) standard gauge 5 ft 3 in (1,600 mm), Brazil
- Driver dia.: 40 in (1,016 mm) diameter
- Length: 65 ft 8 in (20.02 m) over the coupler pulling faces; 65 feet 9 1/2 inches (20.053 m) on some units starting early 1968.
- Width: 10 ft 0 in (3.05 m)
- Height: 15 ft 5 1/4 in (4.71 m)
- Loco weight: 360,000 lb (160 t)
- Fuel capacity: 3,200 US gal (12,000 L; 2,700 imp gal)
- Lubricant cap.: 243 US gal (920 L; 202 imp gal)
- Coolant cap.: 295 US gal (1,120 L; 246 imp gal)
- Sandbox cap.: 56 cu ft (1.6 m^{3})
- Prime mover: EMD 16-645E3
- Engine type: V16 diesel
- Aspiration: turbocharged
- Alternator: main : AR-10 auxiliary : D14
- Traction motors: D-77
- Cylinders: 16
- Loco brake: Independent air optional: dynamic brakes
- Train brakes: Air, schedule 26-L
Performance figures
- Maximum speed: 83 mph (134 km/h)
- Power output: 3,000 hp (2,240 kW)
Career
- Locale: North America; South America; Africa

The EMD SD40 is a model of 6-axle diesel-electric locomotive built by General Motors Electro-Motive Division between January 1966 and August 1972. 1,268 locomotives were built between 1966 and 1972. In 1972, an improved version with new electronics was developed and marketed as a new locomotive, the SD40-2.

== Design ==
Like its predecessor in EMD's catalog, the SD35, the SD40 is a high-horsepower, six-axle freight locomotive. The SD40 is a member of EMD's long-running Special Duty class of locomotives, which all are built with 6 axles.

In 1966, EMD updated its locomotive catalog with entirely new models, all powered by the new 645 diesel engine. These included six-axle models SD38, SD40, SDP40 and SD45. All shared standardized components, including the frame, cab, generator, trucks, traction motors, and air brakes. The primary difference was the power output: SD38 = 2,000 hp (1,490 kW) from a non-turbocharged V16, SD40 = 3,000 hp (2,240 kW) from a turbocharged V16, and SD45 = 3,600 hp (2,680 kW) from a turbocharged V20.

== Original owners ==
856 examples of this locomotive model were built for American railroads, 330 were built for Canadian railroads, 72 were built for Mexican railroads, 6 were built for the Guinea-Boke Project, and 4 SD40Ms riding on 5 ft 3 in (1,600 mm) gauge trucks were exported to Brazil. They were manufactured at McCook, Illinois.

Built	Serial	Phase	Railroad	Road numbers	Quantity	Notes
6/66	31766	Ia2	ASAB	506	1	No d/b
3/66-5/66	32036-32055		ATSF	1700–1719	20	1708/5008 preserved
10/71-11/71	5801-1 - 5801-25	IIc	BN	6300-6324	25	
5/67	33161-33173	Ic	B&O	7482-7494	13	Drop grabs on nose, 7482–7490 to CNJ
4/69	34775-34778	IIb_	B&O	7497-7500	4	
8/66-9/66	32092-32100	Ia2	CGW	401-409	9	
1/66-2/66	31263-31282	Ia1	CNW	867-886	20	No d/b, 867 first SD40 built
4/66	31760-31765	Ia2	CNW	887-892	6	No d/b
9/66	32314	Ia2	CNW	893	1	No d/b
2/67	32686-32688	Ib2	CNW	894-896	3	No d/b
7/66-8/66	31929-31948	Ia2	C&O	7450-7469	20	
5/67	33154-33160	Ic	C&O	7475-7481	7	Drop grabs on nose
4/69	34779-34784	IIb_	C&O	7501-7506	6	
6/70	36696-36705	IIb2	C&O	7507-7516	10	
7/70	36746-36755	IIb2	C&O	7517-7526	10	
3/71	37204-37213	IIc	C&O	7527-7536	10	
10/67	33516-33519	IIa2	C&S	875-878	4	To Burlington Northern Same numbers.
4/68	33918-33926	IIb1	C&S	879-887	9	To Burlington Northern Same numbers. 879 to BNSF.
9/66	32141-32148	Ia2	CRR	3000-3007	8	
9/68	34177	IIb_	CRR	3008	1	
9/68	34742-34747	IIb_	CRR	3009-3014	6	
6/71	37417-37422	IIc	CRR	3015-3020	6	
6/71	37538-37541	IIc	CRR	3021-3024	4	
4/70	36124-36129	IIb2	DE	001-006	6	Numbers out of sequence
7/72	5817-1 - 5817-2	III	DE	013-014	2	
7/72	5818-1 - 5818-3	III	DE	015-017	3	
6/66	31799	Ia2	GM	10	1	No d/b
2/66	31007-31018	Ia1	GM&O	901-912	12	
9/66	32161-32169	Ia2	GM&O	913-921	9	
8/69	35184-35195	IIb_	GTW	5900-5911	12	No d/b
1/70	35831-35839	IIb2	GTW	5912-5920	9	
9/70	36887-36895	IIb2	GTW	5921-5929	9	No d/b
12/67	33244-33249	IIa2	IC	6000-6005	6	No d/b
8/69	34939-34951	IIb_	IC	6006-6018	13	SD40A: 70 ft 8 in (21.54 m) frame, 5,000-US-gallon (19,000 L; 4,200 imp gal) fuel tank
1/70	35685-35689	IIb2	IC	6019-6023	5	SD40A: 70 ft 8 in (21.54 m) frame, 5,000-US-gallon (19,000 L; 4,200 imp gal) fuel tank
10/66-11/66	32101-32114	Ib1	KCS	600-613	14	Some equipped with Locotrol
8/68	33958-33965	IIb_	KCS	614-621	8	Some equipped with Locotrol
6/70	35493-35498	IIb2	KCS	622-627	6	Some equipped with Locotrol, numbers out of sequence
3/71	35840-35847	IIc	KCS	628-635	8	Some equipped with Locotrol
3/71	38363	IIc	KCS	636	1	
6/66-9/66	32088-32091	Ia2	L&N	1225–1228	4	
4/69	34758-34762	IIb_	L&N	1229–1233	5	
4/70	35948-35952	IIb2	L&N	1234–1238	5	
8/70-9/70	36809-36818	IIb2	L&N	1239–1248	10	
5/71	38203-38212	IIc	L&N	1249–1258	10	
1/68-2/68	33771-33784	IIb1	MP	720-733	14	No d/b
2/69	34504-34523	IIb_	MP	734-753	20	No d/b
1/70	35725-35740	IIb2	MP	754-769	16	No d/b
3/71-4/71	37543-37562	IIc	MP	770-789	20	No d/b
3/67-4/67	32968-32987	Ib2	MP	700-719	20	No d/b
5/66-6/66	31899-31928	Ia2	NW	1580–1609	30	High short hood
5/71	35605-35619	IIc	NW	1610–1624	15	High short hood
12/70-1/71	36896-36926	IIb2	PC	6240-6270	31	
1/71-2/71	36997-37010	IIb2	PC	6271-6284	14	To Conrail same numbers; Various units wrecked and retired
2/66-3/66	31285-31349	Ia12, Ia2	PRR	6040-6104	65	To Penn Central same numbers.
4/69-5/69	34889-34898	IIb_	SOO	736-745	10	No d/b
3/70	36099-36102	IIb2	SOO	746-749	4	No d/b
5/71	37425-37431	IIc	SOO	750-756	7	No d/b
4/71	37355-37370	IIc	SOU	3170-3185	16	High short hood; To Norfolk Southern same numbers
12/71-1/72	7375-1 - 7375-15	III	SOU	3186-3200	15	High short hood: To Norfolk Southern same numbers
1/66-5/66	31491-31569	Ia1, Ia2	SP	8400-8478	79	Numbers out of sequence
4/68-6/68	33671-33680	IIb_	SP	8479-8488	10	
10/66-12/66	32400-32434	Ib1	UP	3048-3082	35	
4/66	31414-31438	Ia2	UP	3000-3024	25	
4/66	31575-31589	Ia2	UP	3025-3039	15	
8/71-9/71	37639-37653	IIc	UP	3083-3097	15	
9/71-10/71	37904-37928	IIc	UP	3098-3122	25	
8/66	32134-32138	Ia2	WM	7470-7474	5	
11/68	34104-34105	IIb_	WM	7495-7496	2	
7/69	34967-34971	IIb_	WM	7445-7449	5	

Built by GMD at London, Ontario

Built	Serial	Phase	Railroad	Road numbers	Quantity	Notes
10/71	A2561-A2563		AC	180-182	3	
9/67	A2246-A2253		CN	5000-5007	8	
10/67-12/68	A2260-A2327		CN	5008-5075	68	No d/b . 5062 destroyed in the 1986 Hinton train collision .
2/69-11/69	A2335-A2369		CN	5076-5110	35	No d/b . 5104 destroyed in the 1986 Hinton train collision .
11/69-12/69	A2370-A2391		CN	5111-5132	22	
12/69-4/71	A2392-A2434		CN	5133-5175	43	No d/b
4/71-11/71	A2493-A2542		CN	5176-5225	50	No d/b
11/71-12/71	A2588-A2602		CN	5226-5240	15	No d/b
7/66	A2133-A2164	Ia2	CP	5500-5531	32	Nose brakewheel
12/66	A2177-A2209		CP	5532-5564	33	
7/68	A2328-A2333		QNSL	200-205	6	
6/71	A2543-A2557		QNSL	206-220	15	

Export SD40's Built by EMD at McCook, Illinois or GMD at London, Ontario

Built	Serial	Phase	Railroad	Road numbers	Quantity	Notes
4/67	32228-32231		RFFSA	3701-3704	4	Brazil, 5 ft 3 in (1,600 mm) Broad gauge, model SD40M on a shortened 60 ft 10 in (18.55 m) frame
5/68	33385-33403		NdeM	8503-8521	19	
3/68	33895-33897		NdeM	8500-8502	3	
12/71	38893-38932	III	NdeM	8536-8575	40	
8/72	37894-37899		BOKE	101-106	6	Companie de Bauxite du Guinea
1/72	A2603-A2612		NdeM	8576-8585	10	Low-nose headlight, bell between number boards

Phases are as listed by Robert Sarberenyi.

== Derivatives and Experimental ==
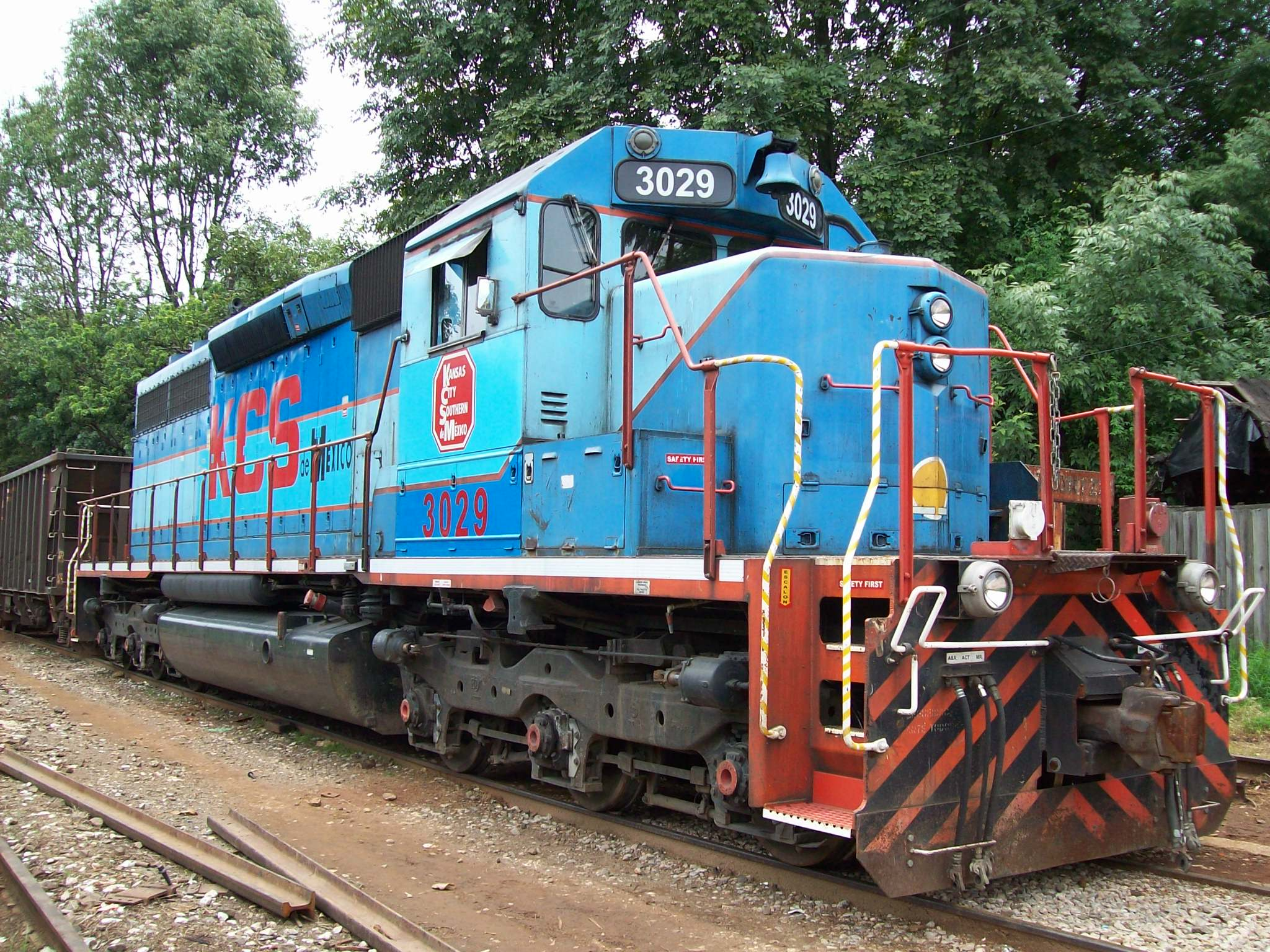
GMD SD40 KCSM 3029 in Caltzonzin Station

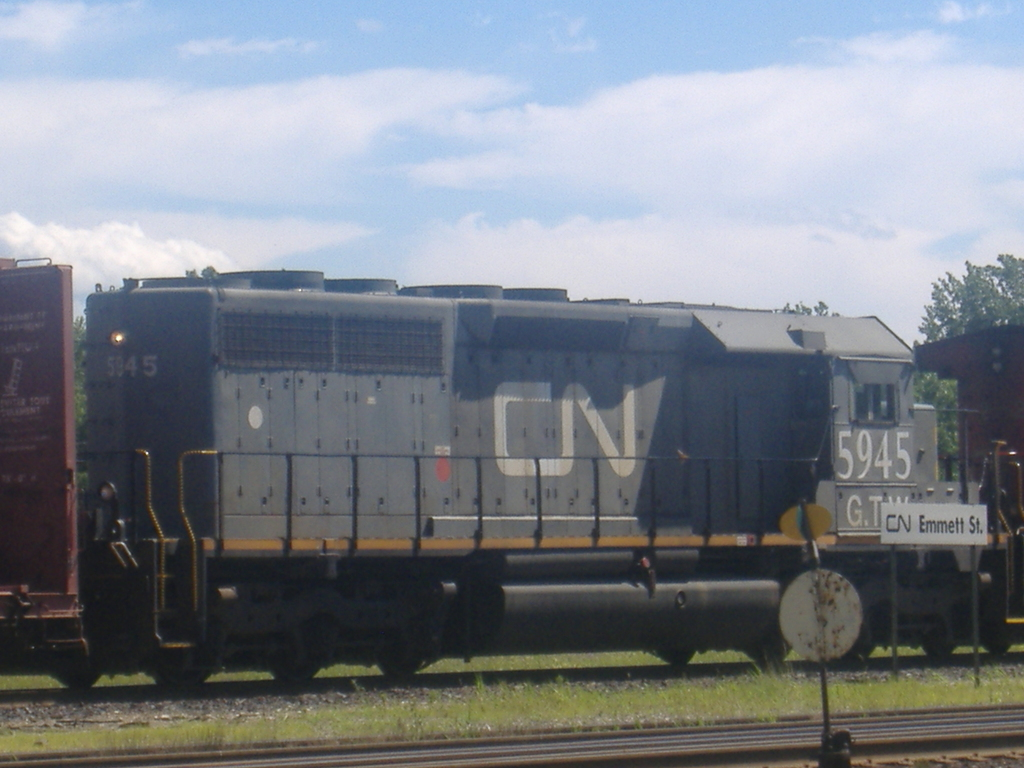
GTW/CN #5945, a former GMD-built CN SD40, rebuilt to SD40-3 standards.

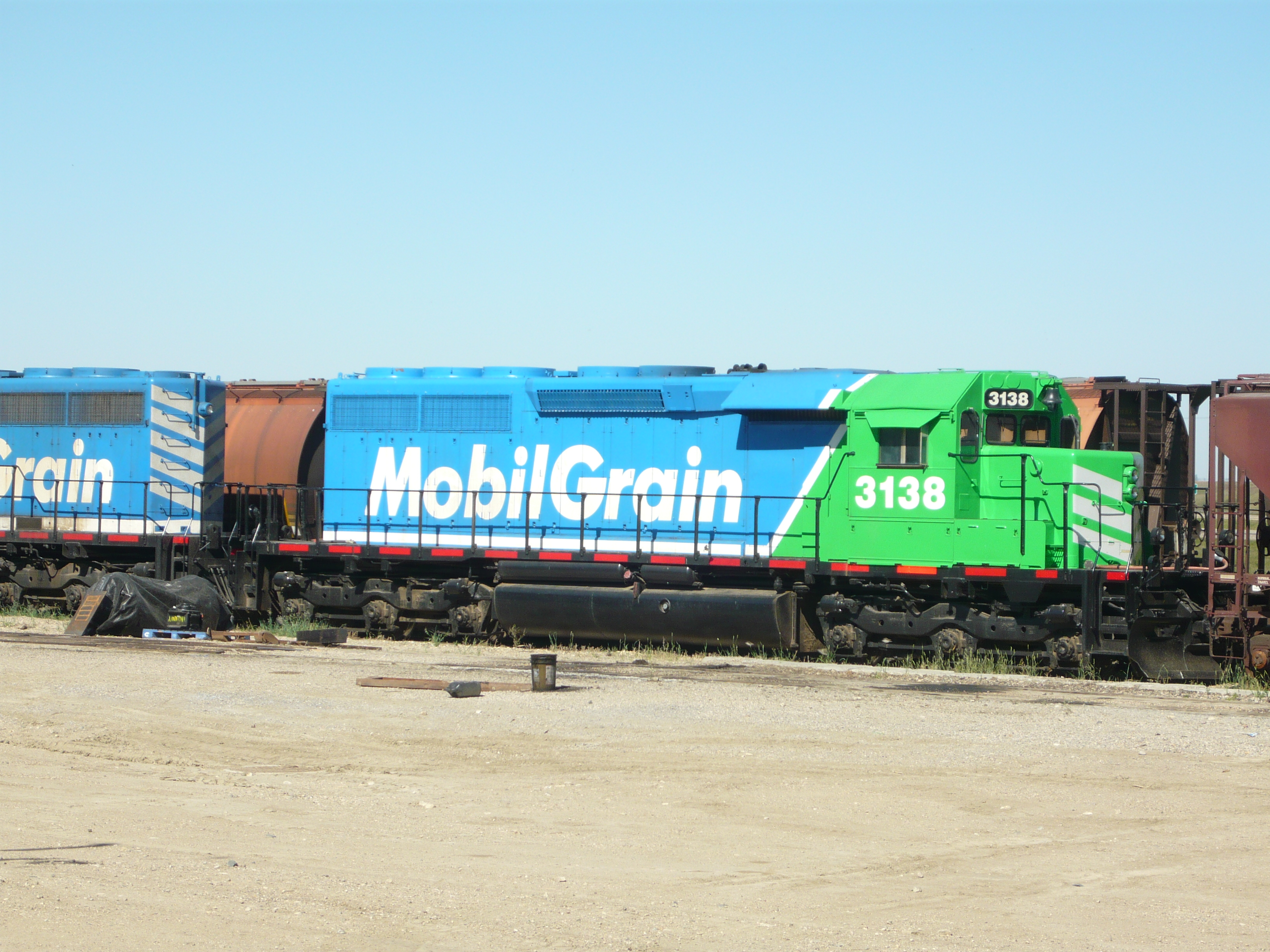
Last Mountain Railway SD40-3 at Aylesbury, Saskatchewan

The very first test bed SD40, EMD 434, constructed on an SD35 frame in July 1964 was in active service until retired by Canadian National Railway in March 2009 and donated to the Monticello Railway Museum in July 2009, albeit having been upgraded to an "SD40-2R", as Illinois Central 6071.

18 customized SD40s were built for the Illinois Central Railroad as model SD40A, using the longer SDP45 frame, which allowed for a larger 5,000 gallon fuel tank.

Versions of the SD40 modified for the Australian loading gauge were sold to WAGR and Victorian Railways as their L and C classes respectively.

The SD40 was succeeded by an upgraded Dash 2 version called the SD40-2.

== SD40 rebuilds ==
After having been succeeded by the more modern SD40-2, a large number of SD40s have been upgraded with more modern equipment. The main difference between rebuilt SD40s and genuine SD40-2s is that the latter use a longer frame and have longer front and rear porches, while the rebuilt SD40s have a shorter frame.

A common product of rebuilding SD40s, and sometimes SD40-2s, is an SD40-3. The major addition denotes that the rebuilt unit or units as an SD40-3 is the addition of a micro-processor, and sometimes other modern components. The usual reasons for installing a micro-processor are improved traction control, and better fuel economy (via better injection control). Also, electronic control over braking systems (independent and automatic). This may include some SD39, SD45 and SD45-2 rebuilt to SD40-2 standards.

The SD40R is a rebuilt of all the Southern Pacific's SD40 between 1980 and 1981.

The SD40M-2 was a rebuild done by Morrison Knudsen for two railroads, the Southern Pacific, using 97 SD45s, 30 SD40s and 6 SDP45s, and the Canadian Pacific, using another three SD40s and seven SD45s.

The SD40-2XR designates 15 SD40 and a SDP40 rebuilt to Dash-2 standards for Montana Rail Link.

The SD40E is an SD50 rebuilt by the Norfolk Southern Railway and derated to 3000 HP (equivalent to an SD40-2).

== Preservation ==
=== SD40 ===
- Canadian Pacific SD40 #5500 is preserved at the Revelstoke Railway Museum in Revelstoke, British Columbia. It was CP's first SD40, built in 1966 at GMD's London plant and was retired in 2001. The unit was donated to the museum in 2007. Plans are being made to restore the locomotive to its original grey/tuscan red paint scheme, known as the Canadian Pacific "Script"
- Chesapeake and Ohio #7534 is preserved at the C&O Historical Society in Clifton Forge, Virginia. While #7534 spends most of its time at the Historical Society's museum, it sees occasional revenue service on the Buckingham Branch Railroad.
- CSX #4621 (formerly Western Maryland #7496) is preserved at the Western Maryland Scenic Railroad. It was donated by CSX in 2025. The WMSR plans to restore #4621 to operation and return it to its original appearance.
- Louisville and Nashville #1230 is owned by the Tennessee Valley Railroad Museum. The museum plans to use #1230 on the museum's for-profit subsidiary, the Tyner Terminal Railroad, It will eventually be restored to one of its earlier L&N liveries.
- Norfolk Southern #1580 is preserved by the Roanoke Chapter NRHS. It was donated by Norfolk Southern in 2024. It is presently being restored to its N&W "Pevler Blue" paint scheme.
- Santa Fe #5007 is preserved at the Western America Railroad Museum in Barstow, California. It's currently numbered GN 6307, after being donated to the museum by BNSF.
- Santa Fe #5008 is preserved at the Walt Disney Hometown Museum in Marceline, Missouri.
- Southern #3170 is preserved at the Tennessee Valley Railroad Museum in Chattanooga, Tennessee. Originally restored by Norfolk Southern in 2015 and used in revenue service, it was donated to the TVRM in 2016.
- Western Maryland #7471 is owned by Precision Locomotive Leasing and was leased to various shortlines, including Western Maryland Scenic Railroad, Steam Railroading Institute in Owosso, Michigan, and Buckingham Branch Railroad.

=== Rebuilds ===
- Illinois Central SD40-2R #6071, the first SD40 built, is preserved at the Monticello Railway Museum in Monticello, Illinois. It was donated in 2009. #6071 is preserved in near-operable condition, only needing new traction motors to operate.

=== Crew Training Programs ===
- PRLX 3066 (ex-KCSM #1343) is owned by the Coastal Pines Technical College in Waycross, Georgia. It is used to train prospective student engineers and conductors.
- Union Pacific SD40R #7362 is owned by the North Platte Community College in North Platte, Nebraska. It is used on the NPCC's North Campus as a training locomotive.

== See also ==
- List of EMD locomotives
- List of GMD Locomotives
