= EMD SDP40 =

Model of 20 North American locomotives

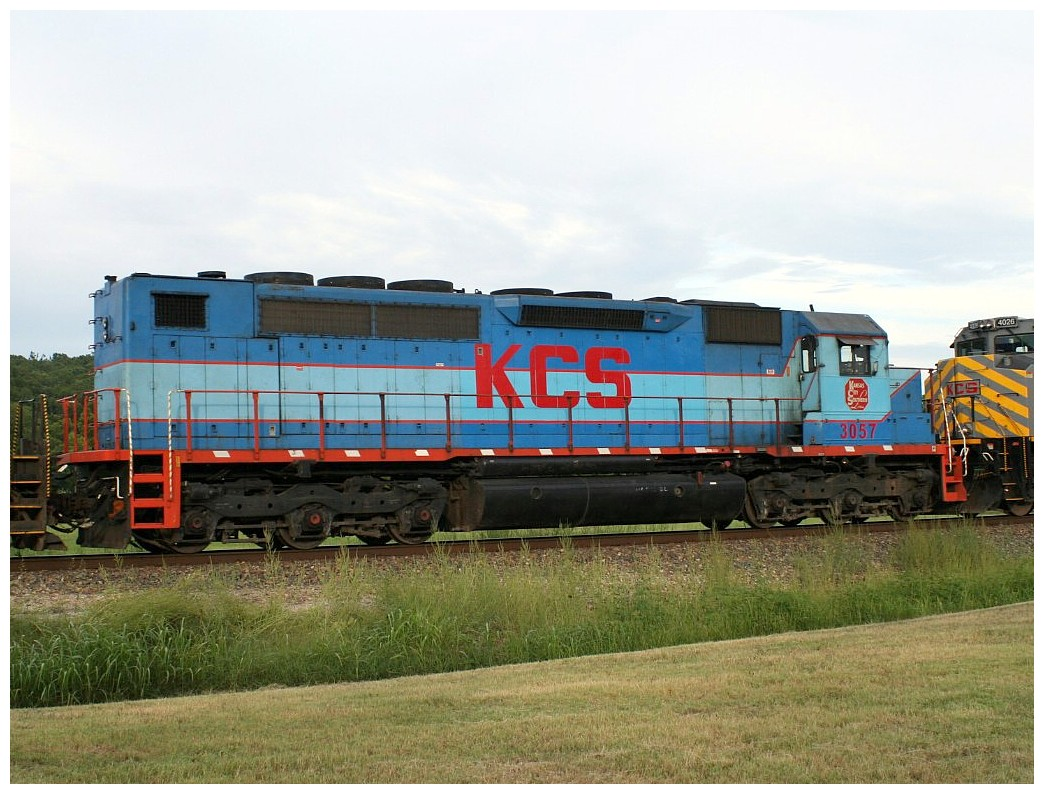
- Kansas City Southern Railway 3057
Type and origin
- Power type: Diesel-electric
- Builder: General Motors Electro-Motive Division (EMD)
- Model: SDP40
- Build date: June 1966 – May 1970
- Total produced: 20
Specifications
- Configuration
  - AAR: C-C
  - UIC: Co'Co'
  - Commonwealth: Co-Co
- Gauge: 4 ft 8 1/2 in (1,435 mm) standard gauge
- Trucks: Flexicoil C2L
- Wheel diameter: 40 in (1,000 mm)
- Minimum curve: 57°/274 ft (84 m)
- Wheelbase: 13 ft 7 in (4.14 m)
  - Truck: 6-Wheel
- Pivot centres: 53 ft 7 in (16.33 m)
- Length
  - Over couplers: 65 ft 8 in (20.02 m)
- Width: 10 ft 4 in (3.15 m)
- Height: 15 ft 7.5 in (4.763 m)
- Loco weight: 368,000 lb (167,000 kg)
- Fuel type: Diesel
- Fuel capacity: 3,200 US gal (12,000 L; 2,700 imp gal)
- Lubricant cap.: 243 US gal (920 L; 202 imp gal)
- Coolant cap.: 295 US gal (1,120 L; 246 imp gal)
- Water cap.: 2,200 US gal (8,300 L; 1,800 imp gal)
- Sandbox cap.: 56 ft^{3} (1.6 m^{3})
- Fuel consumption: 167 US gal (630 L; 139 imp gal) per hour
- Water consumption: 45 US gal (170 L; 37 imp gal) per hour
- Prime mover: EMD 16-645E3
- RPM
  - RPM low idle: 215
  - RPM idle: 315
  - Maximum RPM: 900
- Engine type: V16 Two-stroke diesel
- Aspiration: Mechanically-assisted turbocharger
- Displacement: 10,320 in^{3} (169,100 cm^{3})
- Alternator: Delco 64-72
- Generator: Main: GM - D32; Auxiliary: GM
- Traction motors: GM - D77 (6)
- Cylinders: 16
- Cylinder size: 8.5 in (220 mm) × 10 in (250 mm)
- Transmission: Diesel-electric transmission
- Gear ratio: 59:15
- MU working: Yes
- Train heating: Vapor-Clarkson Steam Boiler AR4125
- Loco brake: Independent air optional: dynamic brakes
- Train brakes: Westinghouse 26L (Air Brake)
Performance figures
- Maximum speed: 83–95 mph (134–153 km/h)
- Power output: 3,000 hp (2,200 kW)
- Tractive effort
  - Starting: 90,000 lbf (400,000 N) @25%
  - Continuous: 82,100 lbf (365,000 N) @ 6.6 mph (10.6 km/h)
Career
- Locale: North America
- Preserved: Great Northern #325
- Disposition: 6 still in service, 1 preserved, remainder scrapped

The SDP40 is a 6-axle passenger diesel-electric locomotive built by General Motors Electro-Motive Division (EMD) between June 1966 and May 1970.

== Design ==
Like its predecessor in EMD's catalog, the SDP35, the SDP40 is a high-horsepower freight locomotive with equipment for passenger train service.

In 1966, EMD replaced all their production units with those powered by the new 645E-series diesel engine. They included six-axle models SD38, SD39, SD40 and SD45, in addition to SDP40. All had standard components including the frame, cab, generator, trucks, traction motors, and air brakes.

The main difference was the power output: the SD38 produced 2,000 hp (1,490 kW) from a non-turbocharged V16, the SD39 produced 2,300 hp (1,720 kW) from a turbocharged V12, the SD40 produced 3,000 hp (2,240 kW) from a turbocharged V16, and the SD45 produced 3,600 hp (2,680 kW) from a turbocharged V20.

The SD40 and SDP40 were so similar that EMD published common operator's and service manuals to cover both.

At the time, most passenger locomotives needed to provide steam to the passenger cars for heating, cooking, and sometimes cooling. They needed a higher gear ratio for faster running, the graduated-release feature on the air brakes, and type F tightlock couplers to keep equipment together in the event of a derailment. To fit a steam generator to the freight-only SD40, the designers had to move the machinery forward about 2 feet (0.61 m) on the frame, add a compartment behind the radiators for the boiler, and divide the fuel tank into fuel and water sections.

== Appearance ==
Earlier passenger diesel locomotives, like EMD E8, ALCO PA, FM Erie-built and Baldwin Sharknose locomotives, were streamlined cab units designed for visual appeal and the appearance of speed. The SDP40 and the SDP35 & SDP45 instead have the same appearance as their freight counterparts. This look was contemporary to, and eventually overtaken by cowl units like the GE U30CG and EMD FP45, SDP40F and F40PH.

Visually, the locomotive is a hood unit distinguished only by the shape of its rear end behind the radiators, with its flat end having no number boards, shuttered boiler air intake on each side, extra exhaust stacks over the boiler, cantilevered walkway around the flat end, and very steep rear steps. EMD applied this same end to the passenger SDP35, SDP45, and GP40P locomotives, as well as the freight DD35, DDA40X and SD40T-2.

Amtrak's SDP40F locomotive, although sharing several mechanical specifications, is visually a much different locomotive. Seven years separate their introductions, and the SDP40F was actually based on the SD40-2. It had a full-width carbody, similar to the FP45, and was also 6 feet (1.83 m) longer than the SDP40, but was not successful after a series of derailments, which made the F40PH succeed the SDP40F.

== Original owners ==
Great Northern Railway (GN) purchased the first six SDP40s in 1966, to replace older E-units on their Western Star and smaller regional trains. Options included a Vapor OK-4740 steam generators, water-transfer capability between units, 59:18 gearing for a top speed of 83 mph (134 km/h), and Type-F couplers. These were followed in 1967 by eight more powerful SDP45 3,600 hp locomotives ordered for the Empire Builder. After the startup of Amtrak in 1971, Great Northern's successor Burlington Northern Railroad (BN) converted the locomotives to freight service.

One SDP40, former GN 323, was temporarily renumbered BN #1976 and painted in elaborate red, white and blue colors for the United States Bicentennial in 1976.

NdeM had ten units delivered in 1968 and another four in 1970. In 1998, the government of Mexico privatized the NdeM locomotives. These locomotives were split between two successor companies. Eight went to TFM, which was later purchased by Kansas City Southern Railway and became KCSM. Of those eight, two were rebuilt to SD22ECOs, and the other six were scrapped. The remaining six went to Ferromex. Of those six, four were rebuilt to SDP40-2s and remain in service, the other two were scrapped.

== Roster ==
| Railroad | Numbers | Comments |
|---|---|---|
| Great Northern Railway | 320-325 | 325 donated to the Minnesota Transportation Museum |
| Ferrocarriles Nacionales de México | 8522-8535 | |
| Totals | 20 | |

== Preservation ==
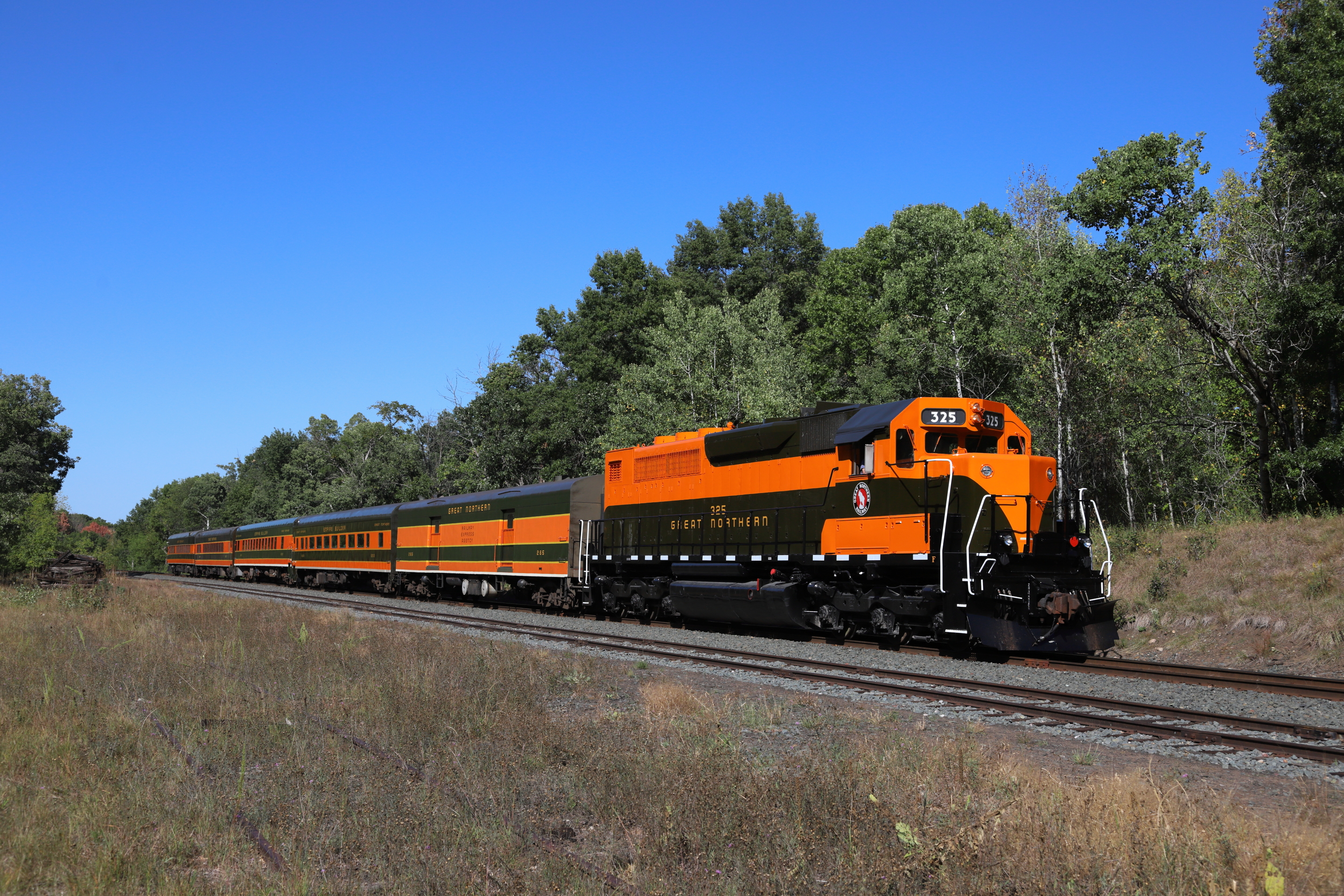
Great Northern 325 in September 2023

BNSF Railway donated #6327 - former Great Northern #325 and their last SDP40 in service - to the Minnesota Transportation Museum in May 2009. Since then, it has been in service on the Osceola and St. Croix Valley Railway. In 2023, the museum repainted the locomotive into the Great Northern's simplified orange and green color paint scheme.

== See also ==
- GP40P
- List of GM-EMD locomotives
- List of GMD Locomotives

== Sources ==
- Moran, Miles (1975). "And Passenger Service Too". Railroad Modeler. 5 (8): 40–47.
- Pinkepank, Jerry A. (1973). The Second Diesel Spotter's Guide. Milwaukee, Wisconsin: Kalmbach Publishing. ISBN 978-0-89024-026-7.
- Shine, Joseph W. (1992). Great Northern Color Pictorial - Volume 2: Division Assignment, Second Generation Diesels, The Big Sky Blue Era. La Mirada, CA: Four Ways West Publications. ISBN 0-9616874-7-9
- Strauss, John F. Jr. (1998). Great Northern Color Pictorial - Volume 5: Rocky's Robe of Many Colors. La Mirada, CA: Four Ways West Publications. ISBN 1-885614-22-5
- The UNofficial EMD Homepage. Retrieved on May 1, 2009
- Sarberenyi, Robert. EMD's SD40, SD40A, and SDP40 - Original Owners. Retrieved on May 5, 2009
- Great Northern Empire - GN EMP SDP40 Roster. Retrieved on May 5, 2009
- KCS NAFTA Rosters. Retrieved on May 5, 2009
- Service Department (1966). SD40 - SDP40 Operator's Manual. La Grange, IL: Electro-Motive Division of General Motors Corporation
- F. Hol Wagner, Jr.; Dave G. Chornell, eds. (1981). "BN Developments: 1977-80". Burlington Northern 1977-80 Annual. 7. P.O. Box 17111, Denver, Colorado 80217: Motive Power Services: 100.
- Erickson, Ron (June 2010). "Great Northern Automatic Heater Cars 1965-1968". The Great Northern Goat. 143 (Reference Sheet 360). Great Northern Railway Historical Society.
- EMD SD 6 WHEEL TRUCKS-DATA. Retrieved on July 25, 2010
