= Copas, Minnesota =

Neighborhood of Scandia, Minnesota, US

Coordinates: 45°14′05″N 92°45′53″W

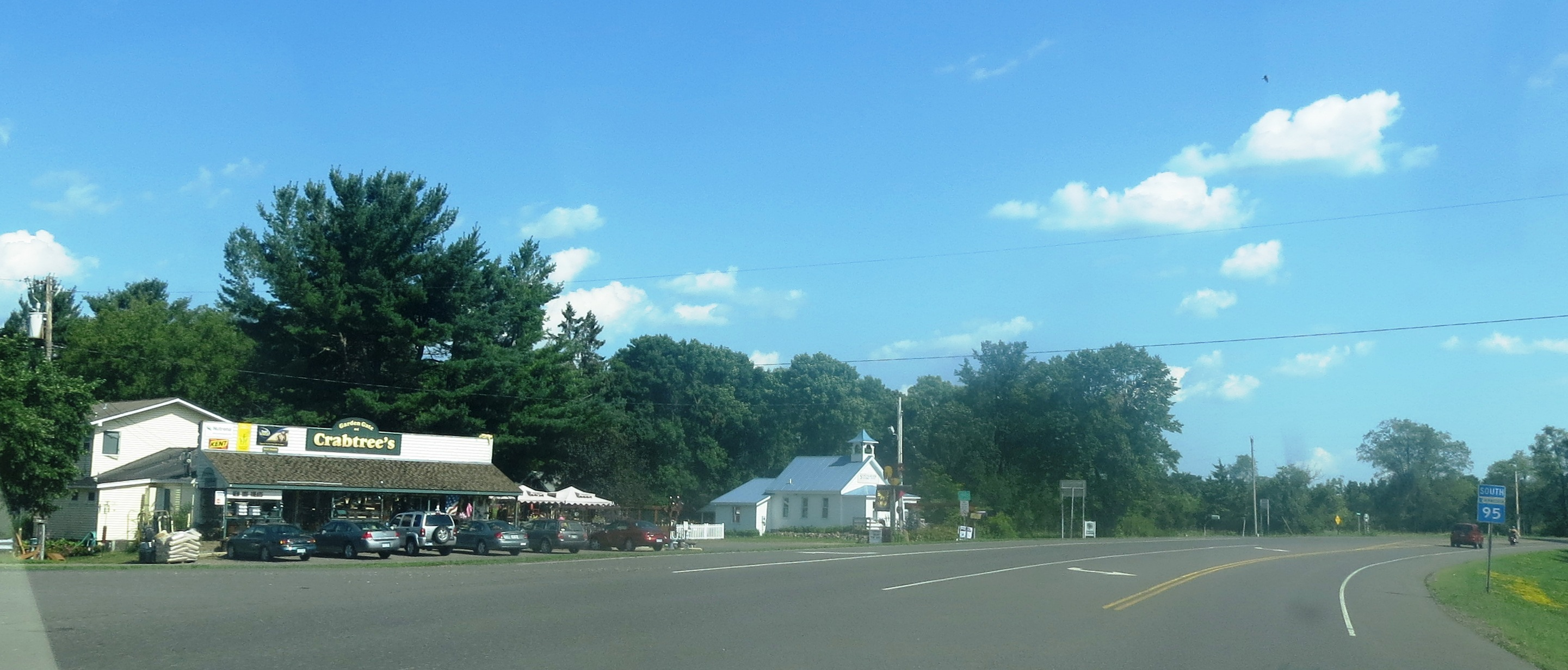
Copas alongside Minnesota State Highway 95

Copas is a neighborhood of the city of Scandia in Washington County, Minnesota, United States. The Osceola and St Croix Valley Railway, which is part of the Minnesota Transportation Museum, goes through Copas. Minnesota State Highway 95 serves as a main route in the community. The John Copas House, built circa 1880 for the settler for whom the community was named, is listed on the National Register of Historic Places.
