= EMD SD40A =

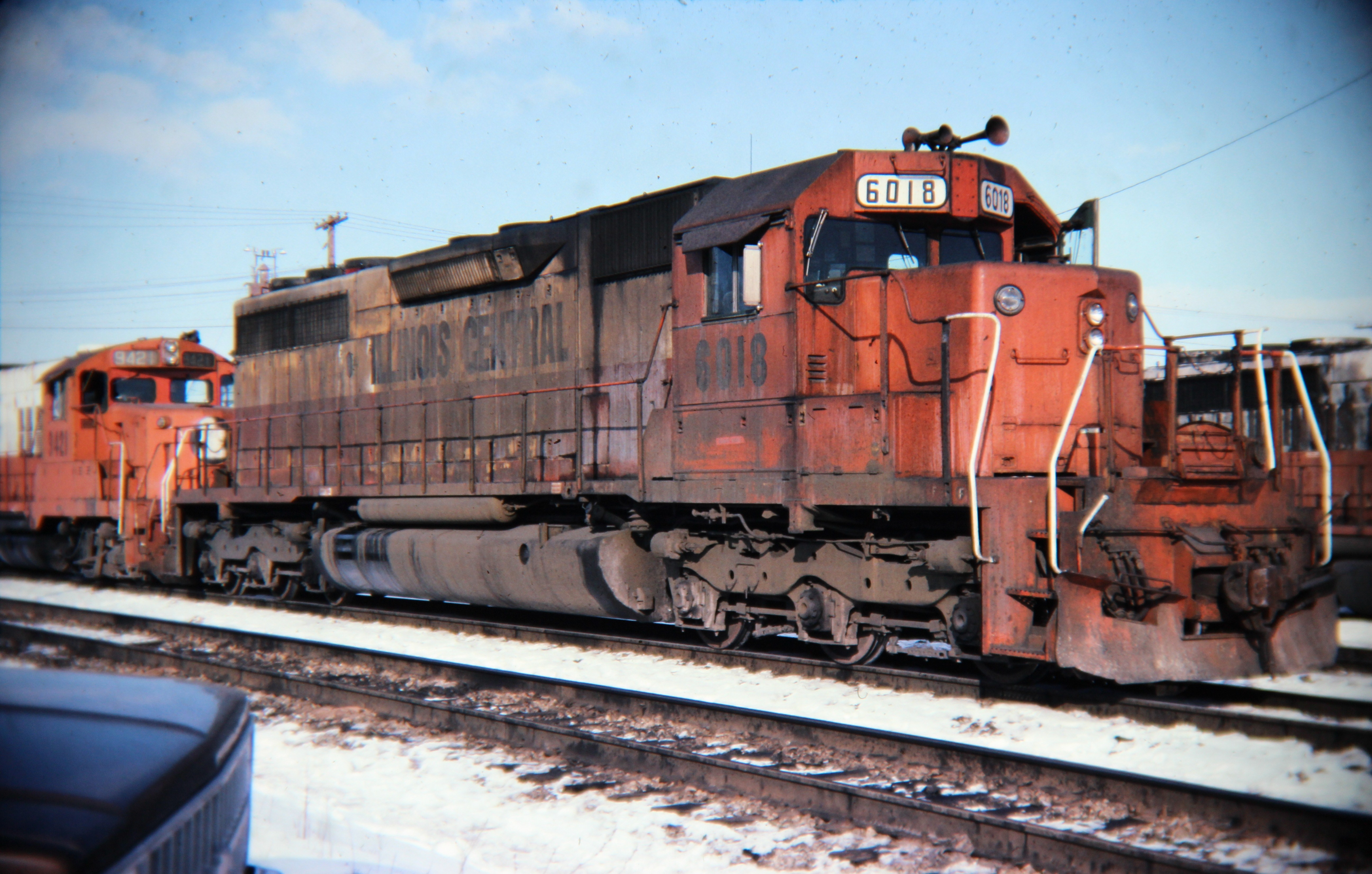
Type and origin
- Power type: Diesel-electric
- Builder: General Motors Electro-Motive Division (EMD)
- Model: SD40A
- Build date: 1969 – 1970
- Total produced: 18
Specifications
- Configuration
  - AAR: C-C
- Gauge: 4 ft 8 1/2 in (1,435 mm) standard gauge
- Prime mover: EMD 16-645E3
- Engine type: V16 diesel
- Cylinders: 16
Performance figures
- Power output: 3,000 hp (2,240 kW)
Career
- Operators: Illinois Central
- Numbers: 6006 – 6023
- Locale: United States
- Disposition: At least one preserved, most retired

The EMD SD40A is a model of diesel-electric locomotive built by General Motors Electro-Motive Division between 1969 and 1970. 18 locomotives were built for the Illinois Central Railroad.

== History ==
A total of 18 units were built by General Motors Electro-Motive Division exclusively for the Illinois Central Railroad between 1969 and 1970. The SD40A was designed as an EMD SD40 built on a frame of an EMD SDP45. The longer SDP45 frame allowed for a larger, 5000 gallon fuel tank.

This locomotive is powered by a 16-cylinder EMD 645E3 diesel engine, which could provide 3,000 horsepower (2,240 kW). Illinois Central Railroad used the SD40A as a long-range road-switcher, utilizing the larger fuel tank found on the SDP45.

Illinois Central sold five SD40As to Helm Financial Corporation in 1985 where they were purchased by the Soo Line Railroad Company, and in 1992 Illinois Central sold one SD40A to National Railway Equipment. Illinois Central rebuilt and reclassified the rest to SD40-2R, during which their dynamic brakes were removed and the locomotive cabs modified. Canadian National Railway having purchased Illinois Central, retired the remaining SD40As in 2010 and two of those, numbers 6009 and 6014, were acquired by Indiana Boxcar Corporation.

== Preservation ==
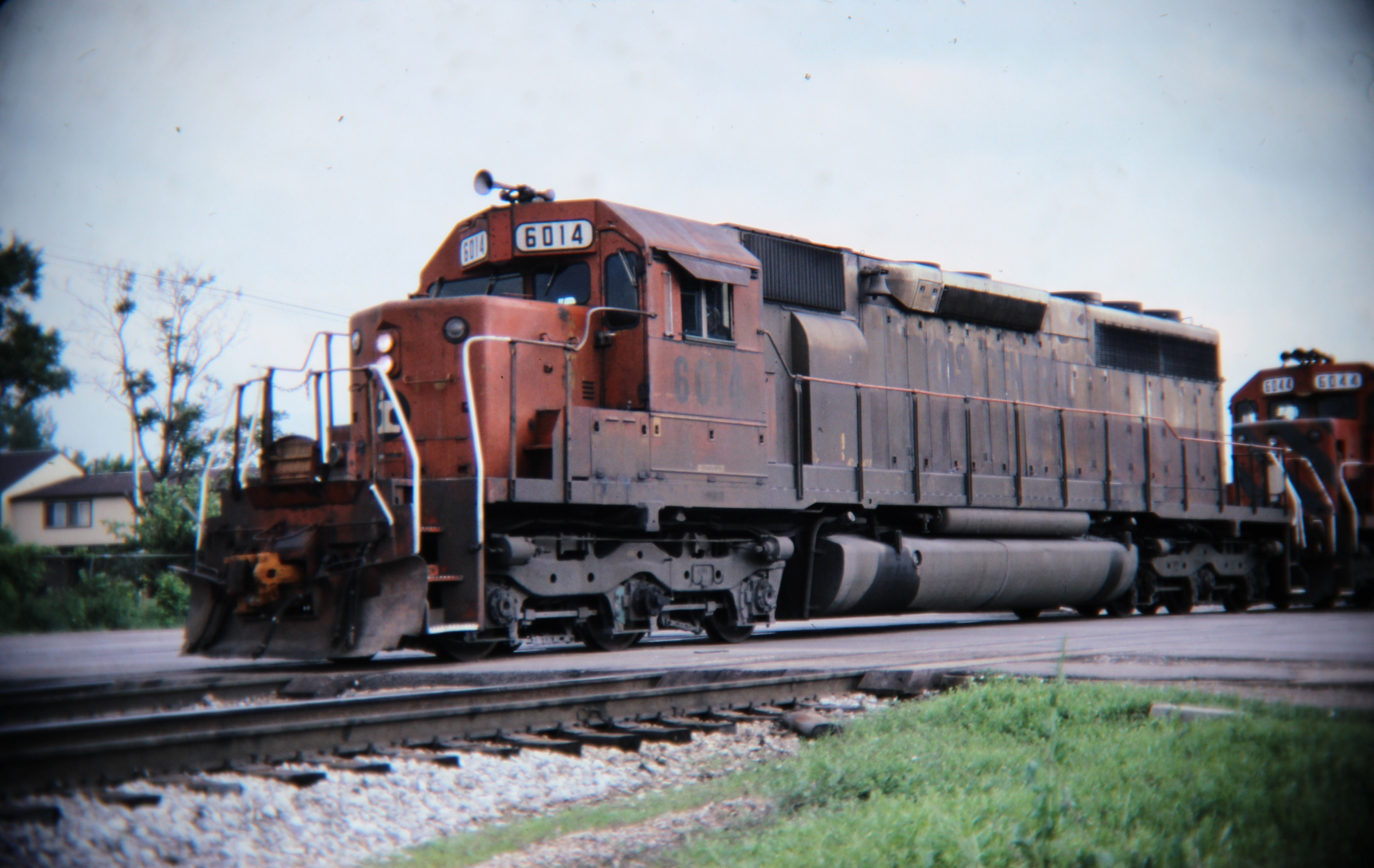
IC #6014 in its Illinois Central Gulf livery.

- Illinois Central 6014 is preserved by Railexco, and is currently undergoing restoration. The unit was purchased by Railexco in 2023 and had planned to operate the unit by the end of 2025. However, the locomotive was listed on the rail equipment brokerage firm Ozark Mountain Railcar in Spring 2026.
