= John Copas House =

Historic house in Minnesota, United States

- U.S. National Register of Historic Places
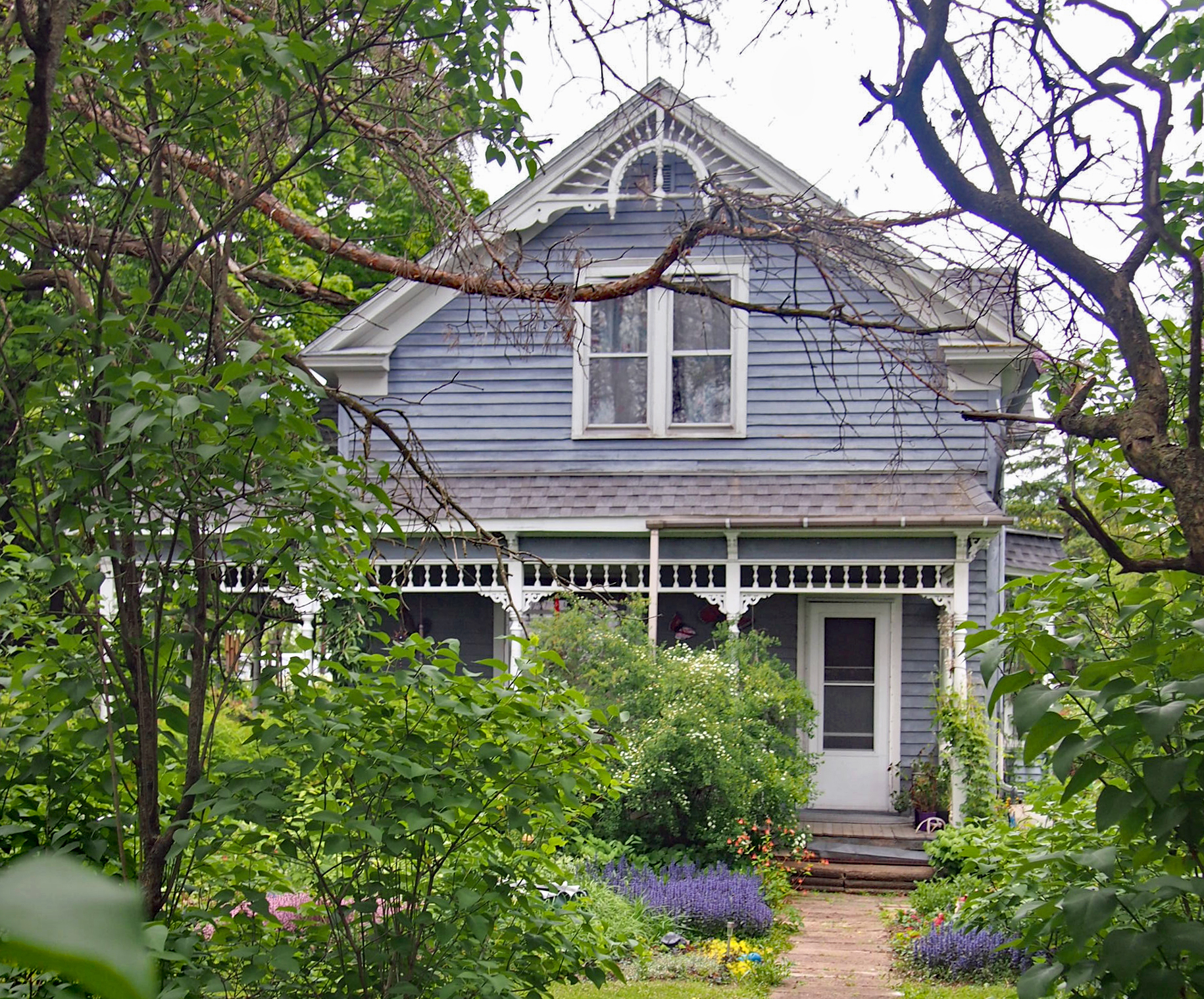
- The John Copas House viewed from the west

- Location within Minnesota Location within the United States
- Location: 19489 St. Croix Trail North, Copas, Minnesota
- Coordinates: 45°13′51.5″N 92°45′47.2″W
- Area: Less than one acre
- Built: c. 1880
- Architectural style: Queen Anne
- MPS: Washington County MRA (AD)
- NRHP reference No.: 80002176
- Designated: July 21, 1980

The John Copas House is a historic house in the unincorporated community of Copas, Minnesota, United States. Its original owner was an Italian immigrant who settled the property in the early 1850s and built this house around 1880 to enlarge or replace his previous residence. The house was listed on the National Register of Historic Places in 1980 for its local significance in the themes of architecture and exploration/settlement. It was nominated for its association with John Copas, an early settler and leading figure in the community platted in 1857 and ultimately named in his honor.

== See also ==
- National Register of Historic Places listings in Washington County, Minnesota
