= EMD SD45 =

North American diesel–electric locomotive class

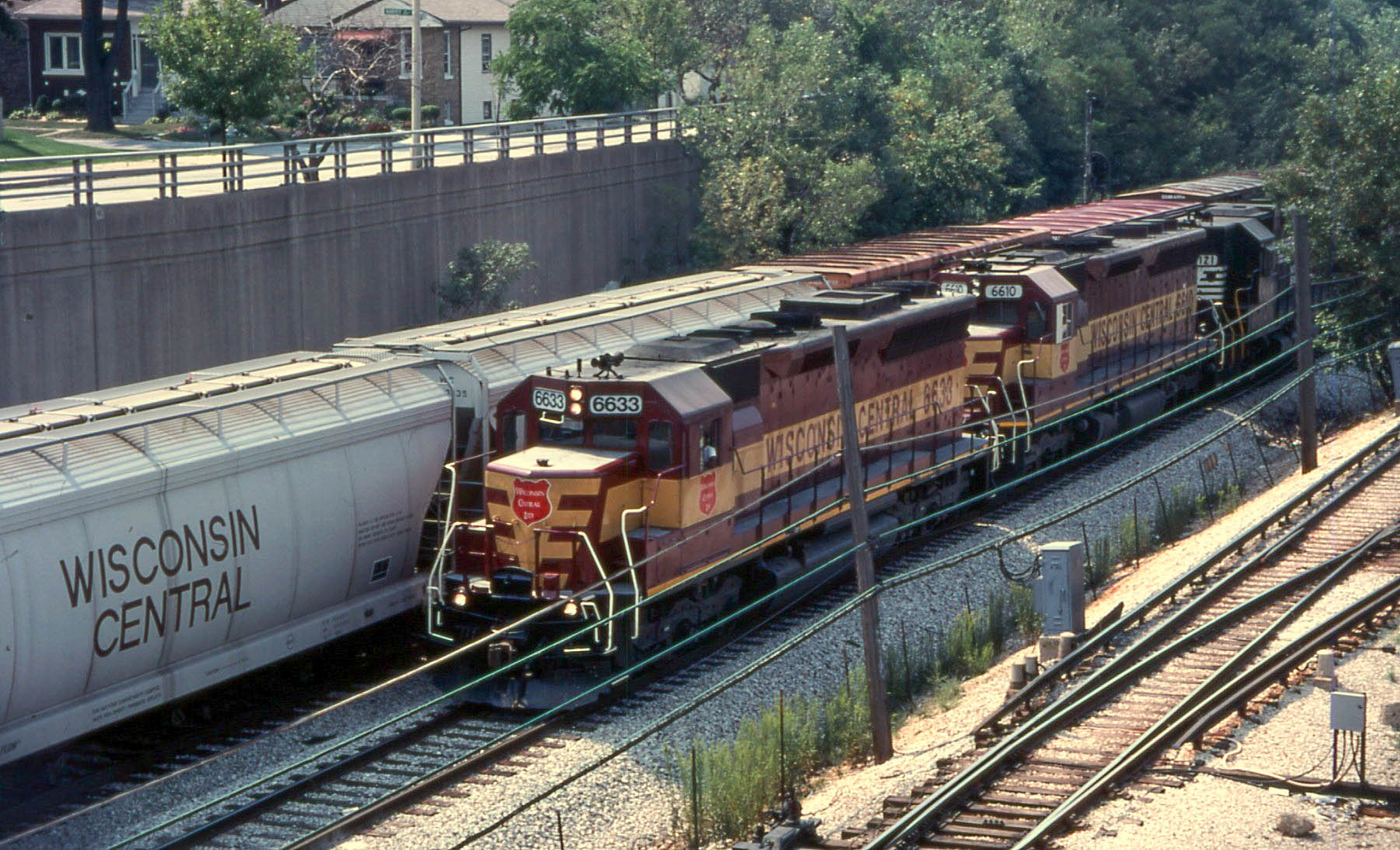
- A pair of Wisconsin Central (WC) SD45s nos. 6633 and 6610 at Oak Park, Illinois on September 5, 1999 on the CSX (Baltimore & Ohio Chicago Terminal Railroad) Altenheim Subdivision. The tracks on the right are the Chicago Transit Authority's Blue Line.
Type and origin
- Power type: Diesel
- Builder: General Motors Electro-Motive Division (EMD)
- Model: SD45, SD45X
- Build date: Dec. 1965 – Dec. 1971
- Total produced: 1,260 SD45; 7 SD45X
Specifications
- Configuration
  - AAR: C-C
- Gauge: 4 ft 8 1/2 in (1,435 mm) standard gauge
- Length: 65 feet 8 inches (20.02 m); 65 feet 9 1/2 inches (20.053 m) on some units starting early 1968.
- Loco weight: 368,000 pounds (167,000 kg)
- Prime mover: EMD 20-645E3
- Engine type: V20 diesel
- Generator: AR10B
- Cylinders: 20
Performance figures
- Maximum speed: 71 miles per hour (114 km/h)
- Power output: 3,600 hp (2,680 kW)
- Tractive effort: Starting: 92,000 lbf (410 kN); Continuous: 82,100 lbf (365 kN) @ 11 mph (18 km/h)

The SD45 is a six-axle diesel-electric locomotive class built by General Motors Electro-Motive Division between 1965 and 1971. It has an EMD 645E3 twenty-cylinder engine generating 3,600 hp (2,680 kW) on the same frame as the SD38, SD39, SD40, and SDP40. As of 2023, most SD45s have been retired, scrapped, or rebuilt to SD40-2 standards.

== Design ==
A total of 1,260 were built for American railroads before the SD45-2 replaced it in 1972, along with the related SD45T-2 "Tunnel Motor."

SD45s had several teething problems. Reliability was not as high as anticipated; the twenty-cylinder prime mover was prone to crankshaft failure from engine block flex. Though it produced 600 horsepower (450 kW) more than the 16-645E3 in the SD40, some railroads felt the extra horsepower was not worth it, even after EMD strengthened the block to eliminate crankshaft failures. At low speeds when tractive effort was adhesion-limited, the SD45 provided no advantage over the SD40.

Buyers included the Burlington Northern, Southern Pacific, Santa Fe, Pennsylvania Railroad, Norfolk and Western Railway, Great Northern Railway, Union Pacific, Denver and Rio Grande Western Railroad, Southern Railway, and Northern Pacific Railway. Many SD45s still exist, some rebuilt with sixteen-cylinder 645s for lease companies. SD45s and SD45-2s owned by Montana Rail Link retain their 20-cylinder prime movers. Wisconsin Central used to roster a large fleet of SD45s, but its sale to CN has resulted in the retirement of the entire fleet, with mass scrappings. Montana Rail Link is also starting to sell some for scrap.

EMD built seven examples of an experimental modification of the SD45, designated SD45X. The SD45X trialed several new features, including a more powerful EMD 645E3 engine producing up to 4,200 horsepower (3,130 kW) and a newly designed truck intended to have higher adhesion. Changes to the body included the use of different radiator fans and a flat rather than beveled end to the long hood. The SD45X was supposed to be a precursor to the proposed EMD 55 series of locomotives (SD55), however due to the failure of the 50 series locomotives, the cataloged SD55 was never put into production. Six of the SD45X locomotives were purchased by the Southern Pacific Railroad, with the seventh kept by EMD.

== Accidents and incidents ==
- On February 20, 1989, Southern Pacific SD45R locomotive #7502 was involved in a wreck that derailed 48-cars of an 82-car train and three of these cars had contained residue from chlorine, phosphoric acid and hydrocarbons.
- On May 12, 1989, Southern Pacific SD45R locomotives #7551 (formerly #8985) and #7549 (formerly #9038) were both destroyed in the 1989 Cajon Pass Runaway when they crashed along Duffy Street in San Bernardino, California.
- On March 4, 1996 Wisconsin Central SD45 6525 would be leading WC L022-4 when it would derail in Weyauwega, Wisconsin. Three cars would explode, causing the town to be evacuated for two weeks. The locomotive has since been renumbered to 7525 and is now on display at the Illinois Railway Museum.

== Rebuilds ==
=== SD45u ===
The Atchison, Topeka and Santa Fe Railway rebuilt 115 units into what had become the EMD SD45u. They were all renumbered as 5300-5483 between 1979 and 1989.

=== SD44R ===
In 1981, the Southern Pacific Transportation Company rebuilt a single SD45 (SP SD45 #8837) into a single locomotive model designated the SD44R and numbered it #7399.

=== SD45R ===
The Southern Pacific Transportation Company rebuilt a total of 167 EMD SD45 units into EMD SD45R diesel locomotives at their own Sacramento Shops under the Southern Pacific's M-99 rebuild program and renumbered their units as 7400 through 7566. Most of them in their SD45 form were classified by the Southern Pacific as EF636-1, EF636-2, EF636-3, EF636-4, EF636-5 and EF636-6, but when they were all rebuilt under the Southern Pacific's M-99 rebuild program, they were classified as EF636LR-1, EF636R-2 and EF636LR-3.

=== SD40M-2 ===
In 1993, the Southern Pacific Transportation Company had made a contract with Morrison–Knudsen to supply 133 locomotives, as part of the contract, Southern Pacific was to supply no car-bodies or shells. The rebuilds consisted of a total of thirty EMD SD40 units, ninety-seven EMD SD45 units and six EMD SDP45 units all of which from various other railroads. Morrison–Knudsen also made ten SD40M-2s for the Canadian Pacific Railway using seven SD45s and three SD40s.

=== SD40-2/SD40-3 ===
The units are rebuilt with a 16-cylinder engine and derated the units from 3600 to 3000 HP.

== SD45 operators ==
Table of original purchasers
Photograph	Railroad	Qty	Road numbers	Notes
	Electro-Motive Diesel (demonstrators)	4	4351-4354	4351 to Illinois Central Gulf as 7000; Units 4352-4354 to Delaware and Hudson as 801-803
	Atchison, Topeka and Santa Fe Railway	125	1800-1889, 5590-5624	84 rebuilt to SD45u renumbered to 5300-5483 between 1979 and 1989.
	Atlantic Coast Line Railroad	10	1024-1033	Except wrecked and scrapped units, renumbered and operated by Seaboard Coast Line Railroad after 1967 merger, many eventually operated by CSX after 1986 merger before being sold to other railroads or scrapped.
	Burlington Northern Railroad	96	6472-6567	
	Chicago, Burlington and Quincy Railroad	15	516-530	To Burlington Northern
	Chicago, Milwaukee, St. Paul and Pacific Railroad	10	4000-4009	
	Chicago and North Western Railway	61	901-920, 937-977	Only SD45's built without dynamic brakes.
	Colorado and Southern Railway	7	868-874	To Burlington Northern
	Denver and Rio Grande Western Railroad	26	5315-5340	
	Erie Lackawanna Railway	34	3601-3634, 801-803	To Conrail. 801-803 ex-D&H; reacquired by D&H in April 1976
	Great Northern Railway	27	400-426	To Burlington Northern
	Norfolk and Western Railway	115	1700-1814	High short hoods; except wrecked and scrapped units, remainder transferred to Norfolk Southern in 1982 merger; many in service until retired in 1987, then sold into leasing or other services. Unit 1728 wrecked and rebuilt with low hood
	Northern Pacific Railway	30	3600-3629	To Burlington Northern
(Ex-PRR unit)	Penn Central Transportation Company	5	6235-6239	To Conrail
	Pennsylvania Railroad	130	6105-6234	To Penn Central, and later Conrail
	Reading Company	5	7600-7604	To Conrail
	Seaboard Coast Line Railroad	35	2010-2044	Except wrecked and scrapped units, Atlantic Coast Line Railroad units renumbered and operated by Seaboard Coast Line after 1967 merger, many of both railroads' units eventually operated by CSX after 1986 merger before being sold to other railroads or scrapped.
	Southern Railway	70	3100-3169	High short hoods; except wrecked and scrapped units, remainder transferred to Norfolk Southern in 1982 merger; many in service until retired in 1987, then sold into leasing or other services.
	Southern Pacific Railroad	317	8800-8963, 8982–9051, 9069-9151	Most rebuilt to SD45R locomotives. 7551 and 7549 destroyed 1989 Cajon Pass Runaway and scrapped.
	St. Louis-San Francisco Railway	49	900-948	To Burlington Northern and renumbered to 6650–6696
	St. Louis Southwestern Railway	39	8964-8981, 9052–9068, 9152-9155	
	Union Pacific Railroad	50	3600-3649	Renumbered 1-60
	Totals	1,260		

== SD45X operators ==
Railroad	Quantity	Road Numbers	Notes
Electro-Motive Diesel	4	4201-4203, 5740	
Southern Pacific Transportation Company	3	9500-9502	
Totals	7		

== Preservation ==
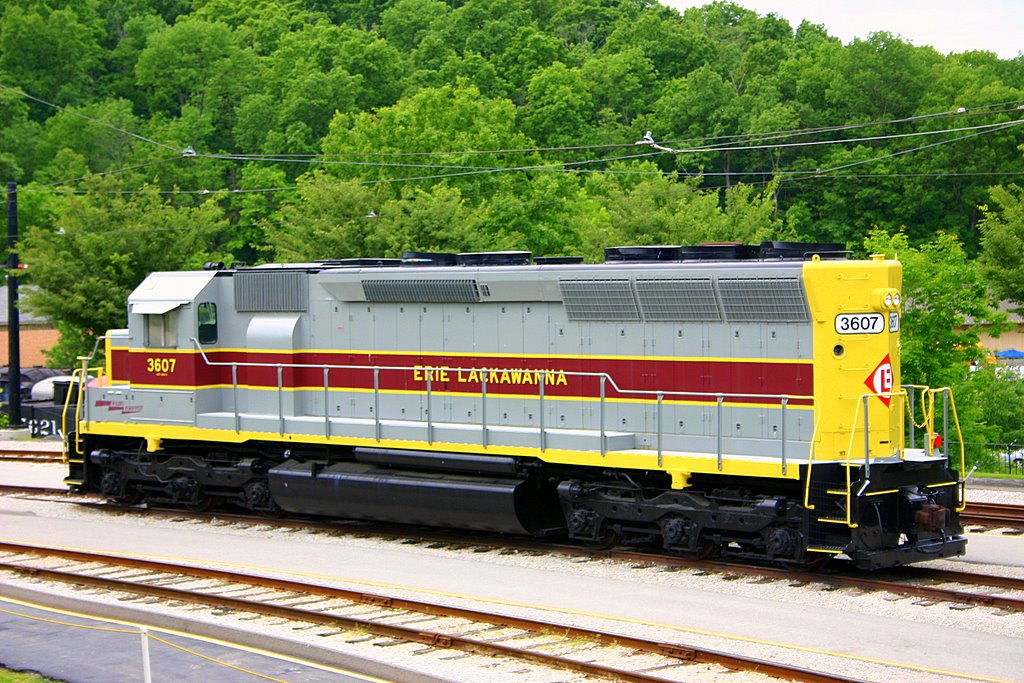
Erie Lackawanna No.3607 is one of 34 SD45's once operated by the railroad.

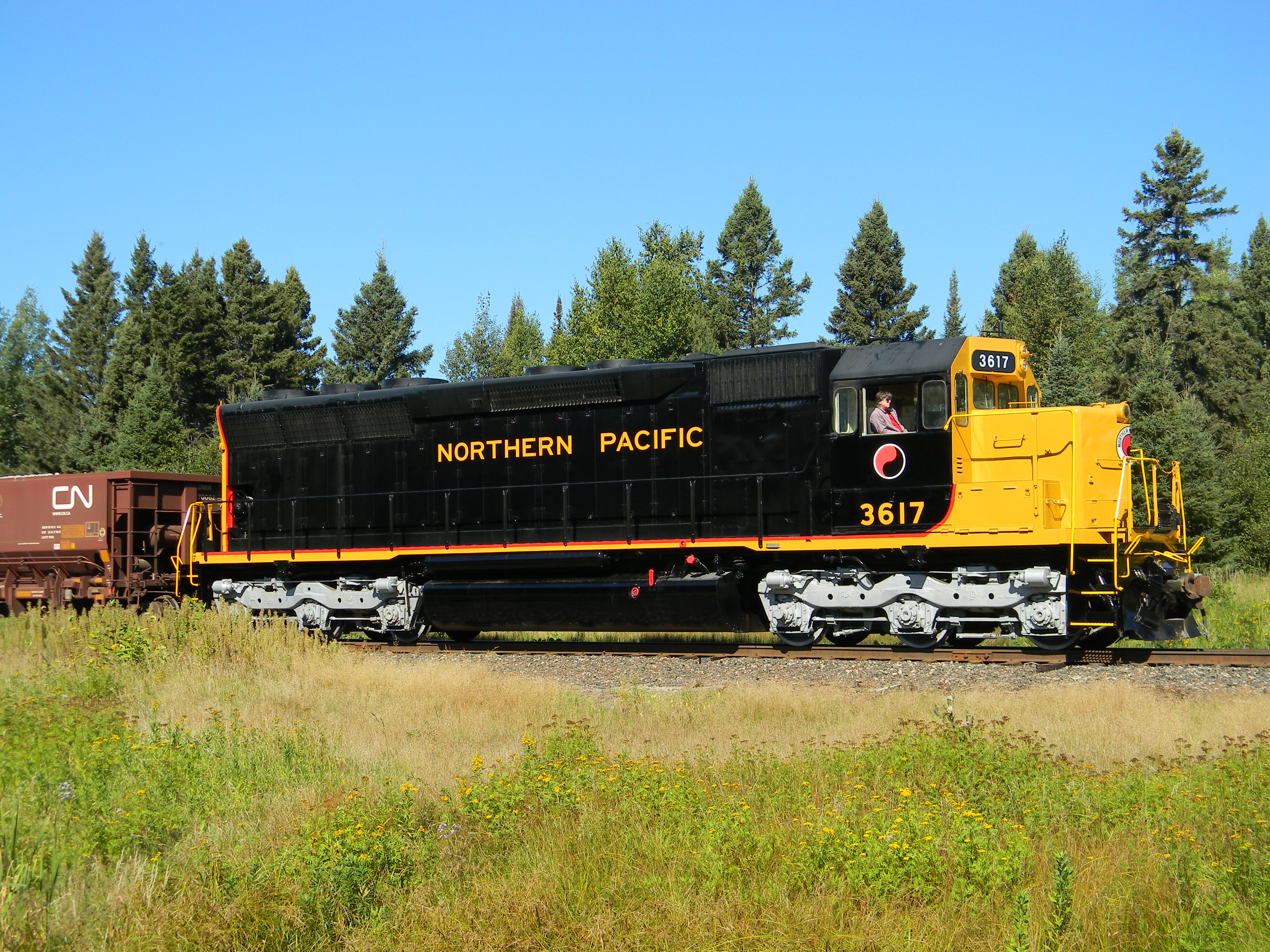
Northern Pacific No.3617, a preserved SD45 in Minnesota

- Erie Lackawanna No. 3607 is preserved at the St. Louis National Museum of Transportation. Restored to EL colors, this unit is a static display.
- Great Northern 400, named "Hustle Muscle", was the first production SD45. It is preserved by the Great Northern Railway Historical Society, based out of Saint Paul, Minnesota. It was in active service on the Minnesota Transportation Museum's Osceola and St. Croix Valley Railway until it suffered a crankshaft failure in its original 20-645E3 engine, requiring a replacement engine to be installed. BNSF Railway overhauled a 20-645E3 engine from a retired ex-ATSF SD45-2 and donated and installed the new engine in January 2019.
- Kansas City Southern No. 1200 (former D&H 801/EMDX 4354) is at the Rail Museum of Heroica Matamoros in Matamoros, Mexico on static display
- Norfolk and Western No. 1776, a high-hood unit, is a static display at the Virginia Museum of Transportation.
- Northern Pacific 3617 is preserved at the Lake Superior Railroad Museum. It has been restored to active service.
- Seaboard Coast Line No. 2024 is preserved at the Southern Appalachia Railway Museum in Oak Ridge, Tennessee, and is currently painted in the Clinchfield Railroad scheme as of December 2017.
- Southern Pacific 7457 is a static display at the Utah State Railroad Museum in Ogden, Utah.
- Wisconsin Central No. 7525 is at the Illinois Railway Museum and is operable. It is one of two WC SD45 units to be painted in an Operation Lifesaver scheme.
