= EMD SDP45 =

North American diesel locomotive class

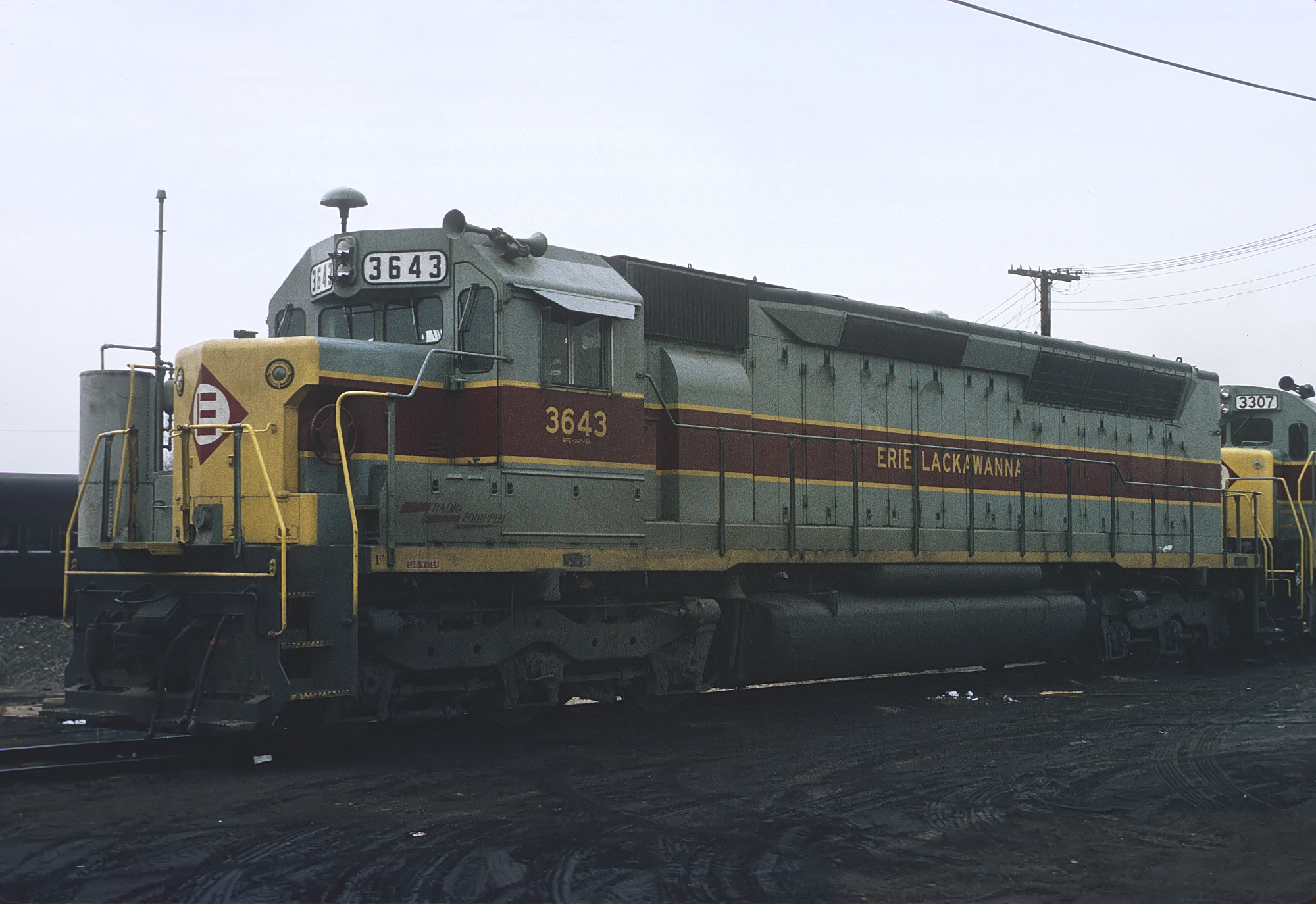
- EL 3643 at the Hammond, Indiana train yard on December 22, 1969
Type and origin
- Power type: Diesel-electric
- Builder: General Motors Electro-Motive Division (EMD)
- Model: SDP45
- Build date: May 1967 – August 1970
- Total produced: 52
Specifications
- Configuration
  - AAR: C-C
- Gauge: 4 ft 8 1/2 in (1,435 mm) standard gauge
- Wheel diameter: 40 in (1,000 mm)
- Minimum curve: 57°
- Wheelbase: 13 ft 7 in (4,140 mm)
  - Truck: 6-Wheel
- Pivot centres: 58 ft 7 in (17,860 mm)
- Length: 70 ft 8 in (21,540 mm)
- Width: 10 ft 4 in (3,150 mm)
- Height: 15 ft 7.5 in (4,762 mm)
- Loco weight: 396,000 lb (180,000 kg)
- Fuel type: Diesel
- Fuel capacity: 3,200 US gal (12,000 L; 2,700 imp gal)
- Lubricant cap.: 294 US gal (1,110 L; 245 imp gal)
- Coolant cap.: 295 US gal (1,120 L; 246 imp gal)
- Sandbox cap.: 56 ft^{3} (1.6 m^{3})
- Prime mover: EMD 20-645E3
- RPM
  - RPM low idle: 215
  - RPM idle: 315
  - Maximum RPM: 900
- Engine type: V20 diesel engine
- Aspiration: turbocharged
- Alternator: GMD14
- Generator: Main: GM - AR10; Auxiliary: GM
- Traction motors: GM - D77 (6)
- Cylinders: 20
- Cylinder size: 8.5 in (220 mm) × 10 in (250 mm)
- Transmission: Diesel-electric
- Gear ratio: 59:15
- MU working: Yes
- Train heating: Vapor-Clarkson Steam Boiler AR4125
- Loco brake: Independent air; optional: Dynamic brakes
- Train brakes: Westinghouse 26L (Air Brake)
Performance figures
- Maximum speed: 95–109 mph (153–175 km/h)
- Power output: 3,600 hp (2,700 kW)
- Tractive effort
  - Starting: 89,500 lbf (40,600 kgf) @25%
  - Continuous: 82,100 lbf (37,200 kgf) @ 6.6 mph (10.6 km/h)
Career
- Locale: North America

The SDP45 is a six-axle, C-C, 3,600-horsepower (2,680 kW) diesel-electric locomotive built by General Motors' Electro-Motive Division of La Grange, Illinois. It was a passenger-hauling version of the SD45 on a stretched locomotive frame with an extended, squared-off long hood at the rear, aft of the radiators, giving space for a steam generator for passenger train heating. This steam generator placement followed the pattern set by the SDP35 and SDP40.

== History ==
The Southern Pacific Railroad ordered their ten on May 9, 1966, with the units being placed in service between May 24 and July 26, 1967, initially on the City of San Francisco between Oakland and Ogden, and eventually used system-wide. As built, each unit carried 2,500 US gallons (9,500 L; 2,100 imp gal) of fuel and 3,000 US gallons (11,000 L; 2,500 imp gal) of steam generator water in a partitioned underframe tank. The steam generator was a Vapor Model OK-4740. SP's units had Pyle National Gyralights on the leading end, came with Nathan P-3 horns, and cost $317,156 each (SP's straight SD45's from the same period cost $290,788 each). Ordered with 62:15 gearing with the overspeed set at 72 mph (116 km/h), the gearing was changed to 60:17 (overspeed at 83 mph or 134 km/h) during 1968–1969. All except 3201 and 3207 would eventually be re-geared back to 62:15 once they entered commuter service.

After Amtrak took over long-distance routes in 1971, various units were leased to Amtrak for West Coast service (primarily on the Coast Starlight) until Amtrak purchased their SDP40F locomotives, while the rest were used in freight service and on Company specials. Beginning in 1973 the SDP45s were used for commuter service on the San Francisco Peninsula Commute, replacing the Fairbanks-Morse Train Masters. SP's commuter service was demanding work and the locomotives required electrical modification to meet those demands. A "Passenger Start" switch was installed inside the cab electrical cabinet; in the "COMM" position the units were held in Parallel, in the "FRT/PASS" position normal transition was made. They stayed on the commute route (often working in freight service on weekends) until 1985 when Caltrain equipment arrived, and they were placed into freight service until their retirement, initially working out of Roseville, then in local and hauler service in the Los Angeles Basin. All were retired between 1986 (3208) and 1990 (3204) and sold for scrap.

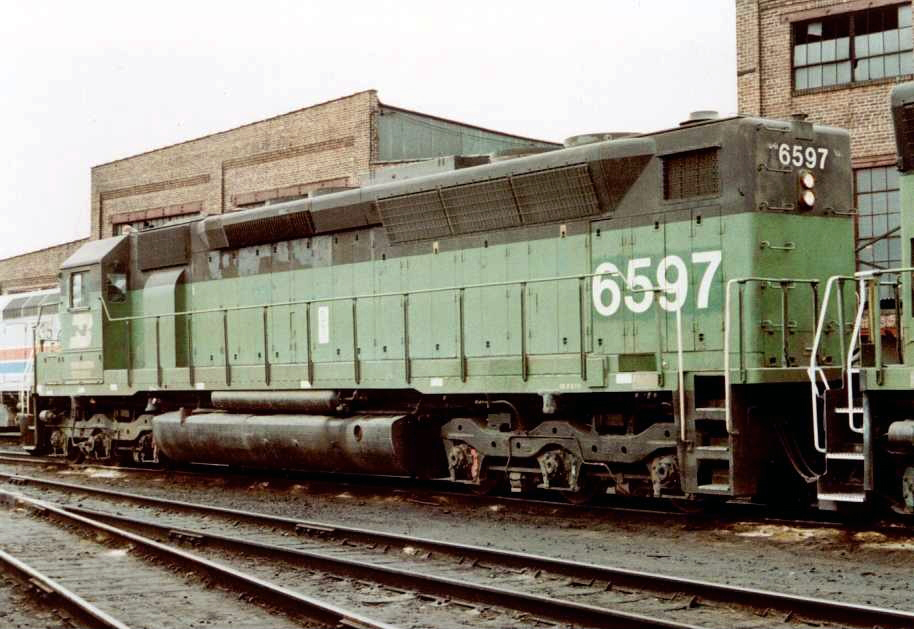
BN 6597, showing the extended long hood aft of the radiators for the steam generator

The Great Northern Railway purchased eight SDP45s in 1967 to replace F-units on the Empire Builder. Normally paired back-to-back, they were also used singly leading F-units. These joined six smaller SDP40 locomotives ordered in 1966 for the Western Star. After the startup of Amtrak in 1971, Great Northern Railway successor Burlington Northern Railroad converted all fourteen SDP locomotives to freight service.

The Erie Lackawanna Railroad ordered 34 SDP45s in 1969 and 1970. Intended only for freight service, these units had standard (angled) long hood ends, and the extra space aft of the radiators had concrete ballast where a passenger unit would have a steam generator and venting. Their longer frames permitted a larger fuel tank which gave the locomotives a greater range between fuel stops. EMD later redesignated these as SD45Ms.

== Experiments ==
One Burlington Northern Railroad SDP45 6599 was retrofitted with an articulated four-axle truck by EMD in 1983–84, converting it to an A1A-B+B wheel arrangement. The middle traction motor in the lead truck was removed and placed in the rear truck. The rear truck, called the HT-BB, for High Traction B+B arrangement, was tested successfully but advances in traction motors obviated the need for four-axle trucks. This testing was not related to the development of the HTCR three-axle radial truck first seen under EMD SD60s and SD60MACs and made standard on the early SD70 series.

== Rebuilds ==
Southern Pacific Railroad 8691-8696 were SD40M-2 rebuilds done by Morrison-Knudsen. They were ex-EL 3654, 3668, 3666, 3665, 3662, and 3659. It is this group that most surviving SDP45s belong to.

== Roster ==
| Order | Built | Serial numbers | Quantity | 1st no. | 2nd no. | 3rd no. | Notes |
|---|---|---|---|---|---|---|---|
| 7955 | 5/67-7/67 | 32849-32858 | 10 | SP 3200-3209 | | | Model SDP45. All scrapped. |
| 7979 | 7/67-8/67 | 33041-33048 | 8 | GN 326-333 | BN 9856-9863 | BN 6592-6599 | Model SDP45. BN 6599's rear truck was rebuilt as two B-type Flexicoil trucks giving the locomotive an A1A-B+B wheel arrangement, the only locomotive of its kind. All to LTEX and presumed scrapped. |
| 7174 | 5/69-6/69 | 34976-34994 | 19 | EL 3635-3653 | CR 6667-6684 | NS 6667-6684 | Model SDP45, EL 3637 wrecked and rebuilt as a slug. Rest to CR and then to NS and eventually traded back to EMD for new SD60 locomotives. |
| 7246 | 7/70 | 36658-36665 | 8 | EL 3654-3661 | CR 6685-6692 | VMVX 6685-6692 | Model SDP45. (later SD45M). All to VMVX and then rebuilt into SD40M-3 locomotives. |
| 7246 | 8/70 | 36880-36886 | 7 | EL 3662-3668 | CR 6693-6699 | VMVX 6693-6699 | Model SDP45. (later SD45M). All to VMVX and then rebuilt as SD40M-3 locomotives. |

== Preservation ==
- Erie Lackawanna Railroad 3639, later Conrail 6670, was listed as being preserved at the Virginia Museum of Transportation. However it currently remains stored offsite at the Museum.
