= Osceola and St. Croix Valley Railway =

Railway in Wisconsin

Coordinates: 45°19′02.6″N 92°42′31.9″W

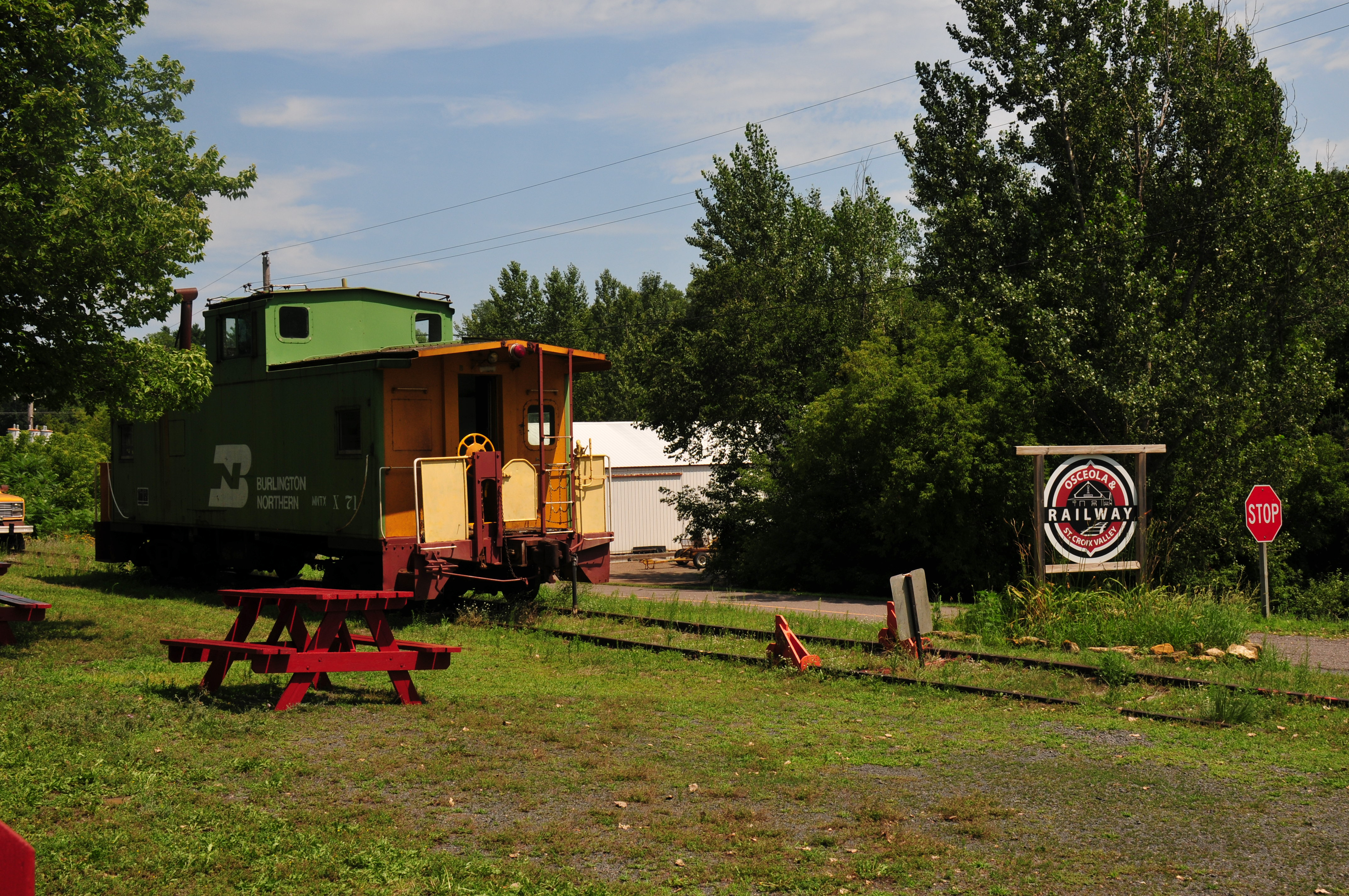
- A Burlington Northern Railroad caboose near the entrance
- Locale: Minnesota; Wisconsin
- Terminus: Withrow, Minnesota; Dresser, Wisconsin
- Connections: Canadian National Railway

Commercial operations
- Built by: Minneapolis, St. Paul and Sault Ste. Marie Railroad
- Original gauge: 4 ft 8 1/2 in (1,435 mm) standard gauge

Preserved operations
- Owned by: Minnesota Transportation Museum
- Reporting mark: MNTX
- Stations: 1
- Preserved gauge: 4 ft 8 1/2 in (1,435 mm) standard gauge

Commercial history
- Opened: 1992

Preservation history
- Headquarters: 114 Depot Road, Osceola, Polk County, Wisconsin

Website
- trainride.org

The Osceola and St. Croix Valley Railway (reporting mark MNTX) is a heritage railroad in Osceola, Wisconsin owned and operated by the Minnesota Transportation Museum. It operates on former Minneapolis, St. Paul and Sault Ste. Marie Railroad ("Soo Line") trackage now owned by the Canadian National Railway.

== History and operations ==
The original Museum railway operated out of Stillwater, Minnesota, however urban crowding caused the railway to seek other areas for service. Invited to operate out of Osceola, Wisconsin, the railway moved in 1992, undergoing a name change to Osceola and St. Croix Valley Railway.

The line itself has operating rights from Withrow, Minnesota up to Dresser, Wisconsin. Due to climate conditions, the line does not operate in winter.

Under successive railroad ownership of the rail line "right-of-way" itself, Operations are currently based in the historic 1916 Soo Line depot, owned by the Osceola Historic Society and leased to the Minnesota Transportation Museum for its rail operations.

The line follows the original route of the Soo Line, running down the bluffs of the St. Croix River, and crossing into Minnesota on the 1887 iron bridge at Cedar Bend, then on to Marine on St. Croix through William O'Brien State Park.

The railway operates every weekend May through October. On alternating weekends it operates the Osceola and St. Croix Dinner Train.

== Equipment ==
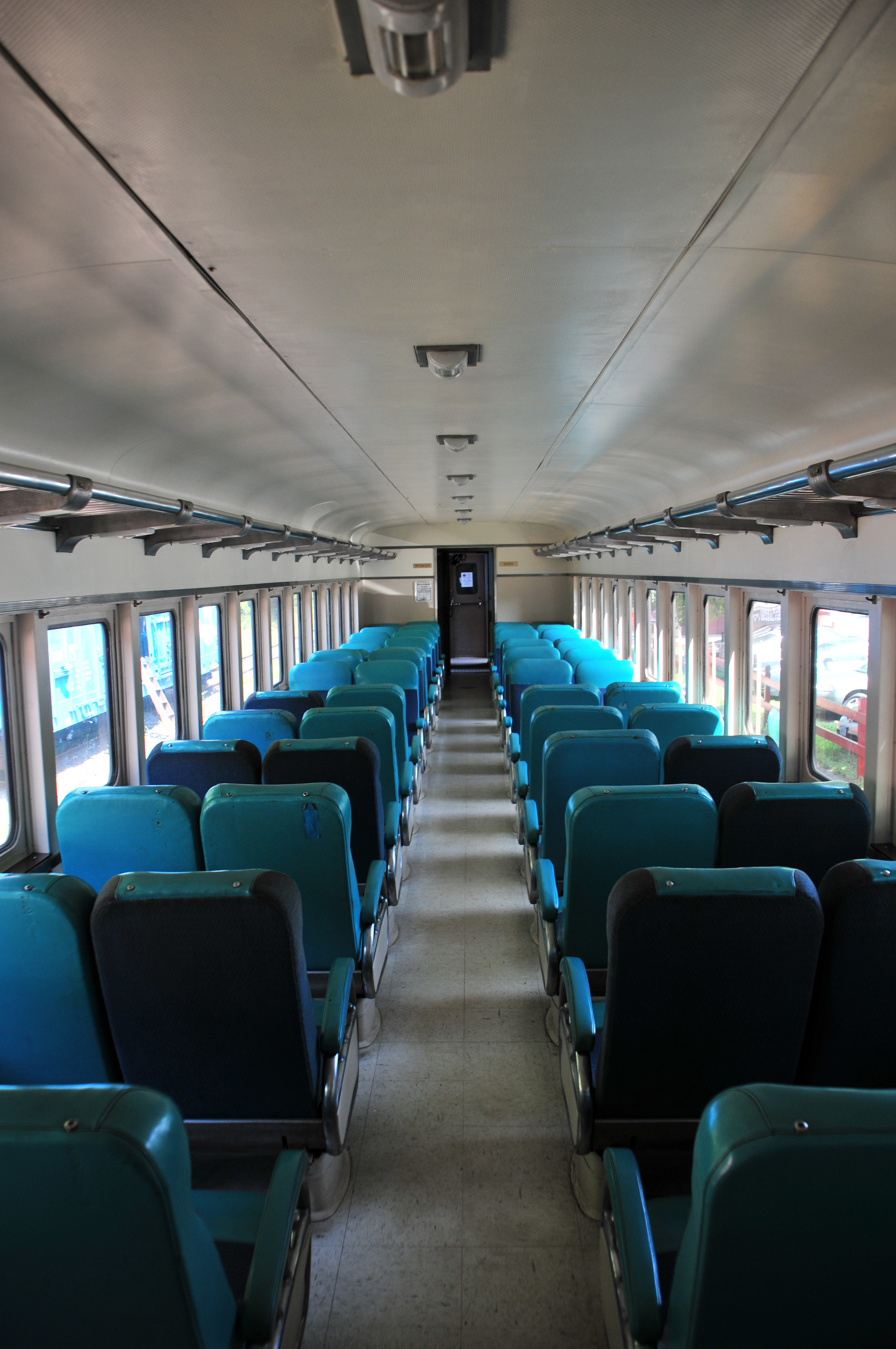
The interior of a passenger coach on the Osceola and St. Croix Valley Railway

The railroad uses historic diesel locomotives from its fleet of Electro-Motive Diesel (EMD) locomotives. It uses a variety of passenger cars for historic presentation and tourist runs throughout the operational season. The railroad runs coach trains every weekend from mid-May through October to Marine on St. Croix (Saturdays and Sundays) and to Dresser (on Saturday).

All operational equipment is serviced at MTM's Jackson Street Roundhouse, a functional railway roundhouse constructed in 1907. The Museum has its headquarters and maintenance base co-located at JSR, which is open to the public for railroad history. Every fall, 2–3 locomotives and up to 5 cars are ferried to St. Paul for annual servicing before returning to Osceola in late spring. Over winter, the maintenance shop demonstrate the servicing and repairs, being one of the few such facilities open to the public.

=== Locomotives ===
These are the locomotives that are active or in restoration for service on the Osceola and St. Croix Valley Railway:

Railroad	Number	Model	Built	Retired	Acquired	Status	Image
Burlington Northern Railroad	6234	EMD SD9	1959	2003	Donated 2003	Operational	
Great Northern Railway	325	EMD SDP40	1966	2008	Donated 2009	Operational	
Soo Line Railroad	559	EMD GP7	1951	N/A	Purchased 1998	Operational	
Great Northern Railway	454-A	EMD F7A	1950	1981	2003	Stored	
Great Northern Railway	558	EMD SD7	1952	1983	2018	Stored, awaiting restoration	

=== Visiting ===
These locomotives visited Osceola and St. Croix Valley Railway under lease:

Railroad	Number	Model	Built	Retired	Status	Notes	Image
Burlington Northern Railroad	400	EMD SD45	1966	1986 (restored 1989)	Operational, at Lake Superior Railroad Museum	Operated on MTM from 2015 to 2017	

=== Passenger cars ===
Type	Number	Name	Railroad	Trains in use	Notes
Streamlined lounge, observation, and business car	A-11		Great Northern Railway	First-class brunch and dinner trains	In service
Streamlined parlor-buffet	1084	"Twin Ports"	Great Northern Railway	First-class brunch and dinner trains	In restoration in Saint Paul, Minnesota
Streamlined baggage	265	"Mariah"	Great Northern Railway	All trains	In service, concession car
Streamlined coach	1096		Great Northern Railway	Coach class	In service
Streamlined coach	1097		Great Northern Railway	First-class brunch and dinner trains	In service, converted to dining car
Streamlined coach	1213		Great Northern Railway	Coach class	In service
Streamlined coach	1215	"City Of Osceola"	Great Northern Railway	Coach class	In service.
Heavyweight MU trailer commuter coach	2232		Erie Lackawanna Railway	Coach class/pumpkin trains	In service
Heavyweight commuter coach	2604		Chicago, Rock Island and Pacific Railroad	Coach class and pizza trains	In service
Heavyweight commuter coach	2608		Chicago, Rock Island and Pacific Railroad	Coach class and pizza trains	In service
Heavyweight triple combination	1102		Northern Pacific Railway	U.S. mail car/Railway Express Agency	In service

== See also ==
- List of heritage railroads in the United States
