= EMD SDP35 =

American model of diesel-electric locomotive

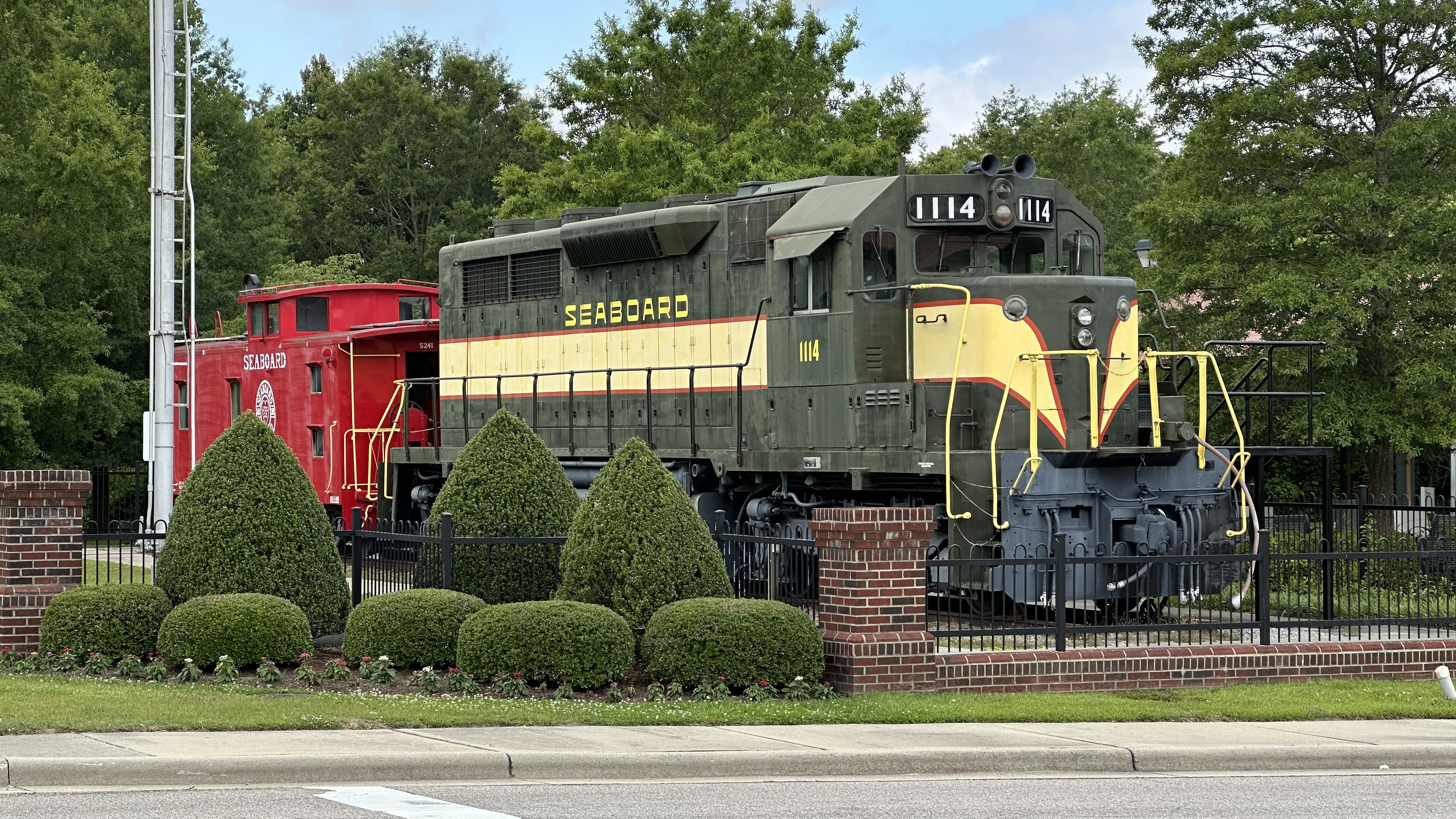
- Seaboard Air Line Railroad 1114, an EMD SDP35, on display in Hamlet, North Carolina.
Type and origin
- Power type: Diesel-electric
- Builder: General Motors Electro-Motive Division (EMD)
- Model: SDP35
- Build date: July 1964 – September 1965
- Total produced: 35
Specifications
- Configuration
  - AAR: C-C
- Gauge: 4 ft 8 1/2 in (1,435 mm) standard gauge
- Trucks: 6-Wheel
- Wheel diameter: 40 in (1,000 mm)
- Minimum curve: 57°
- Wheelbase: 13 ft 07 in (4,140 mm)
- Pivot centres: 48 ft 07 in (14,810 mm)
- Length: 60 ft 08 in (18,490 mm)
- Width: 10 ft 04 in (3,150 mm)
- Height: 15 ft 08.5 in (4,788 mm)
- Loco weight: 360,000 lb (160,000 kg)
- Fuel type: Diesel
- Fuel capacity: 3,200 US gal (12,000 L; 2,700 imp gal)
- Lubricant cap.: 243 US gal (920 L; 202 imp gal)
- Coolant cap.: 260 US gal (980 L; 220 imp gal)
- Sandbox cap.: 56 ft^{3} (1.6 m^{3})
- Prime mover: EMD 567D3A
- RPM
  - RPM low idle: 315
  - Maximum RPM: 900
- Engine type: V16 diesel
- Alternator: GMD14
- Generator: Main: GM - D32; Auxiliary: Delco A8102
- Traction motors: GM - D77 (6)
- Cylinders: 16
- Cylinder size: 8.5 in (220 mm) × 10 in (250 mm)
- Gear ratio: 59:15
- MU working: Yes
- Train heating: Vapor-Clarkson Steam Boiler AR4125
- Loco brake: Westinghouse 24L (Air Brake)
- Train brakes: Westinghouse 24L (Air Brake)
Performance figures
- Maximum speed: 95 mph (153 km/h)
- Power output: 2,500 hp (1,900 kW)
- Tractive effort
  - Starting: 90,000 lbf (41,000 kgf) @25%
  - Continuous: 82,100 lbf (37,200 kgf) @ 6.6 mph (10.6 km/h)

The EMD SDP35 is a model of 6-axle diesel-electric locomotive built by General Motors Electro-Motive Division between July 1964 and September 1965. Power was provided by an EMD 567D3A 16-cylinder engine which generated 2,500 horsepower (1.9 MW). Essentially this locomotive was an EMD SD35 equipped with a steam generator, located in the extended long hood end, for passenger use. 35 examples of this locomotive model were built for American railroads.

== History ==
With its older E-units reaching the end of their serviceable lives, Seaboard Air Line asked EMD for a passenger version of the SD35 that could double as a freight unit, especially if passenger trains continued to be discontinued. EMD came up with the SDP35, and SAL placed an order, trading in E4 and E6 units. The first of SAL's new SDP35s was delivered in summer 1964. Eventually the SDP35 wound up going to four railroads: SAL (20, numbered 1100–1119), Atlantic Coast Line (1, numbered 550), Louisville and Nashville (4, numbered 1700–1703) and Union Pacific (10, numbered 1400–1409).

The SD35 and SDP35 were so similar that EMD published a single operator's manual to cover both.

Although SAL successfully used the SDP35 in high-speed passenger service as well as on expedited freight and piggyback trains, Union Pacific found it unsuitable and relegated its entire fleet to freight service while its famous yellow E-units continued to handle passengers. With the July 1, 1967 Seaboard Coast Line merger, SAL units received passenger numbers 601-620 and also served SCL in both high-speed freight service and on passenger trains. With the arrival of Amtrak, SCL renumbered them into the freight series and numbers 1951–1970. Later in their SCL years, they were renumbered again and assigned into the heavy yard duty and assigned 4500-series numbers. ACL's lone unit was renumbered 1099 when the line acquired former MKT E8s. At the SCL merger, it was assigned number 600 and then later received SCL number 1950.

Louisville & Nashville's four SDP35s (1700–1703), ordered in spring 1964 to replace aging E and F units in passenger service, were completed and delivered without steam generation equipment installed, after approval of several passenger train cancellations from government regulatory agencies during the locomotives' assembly, leaving L&N with a surplus of passenger locomotives. After delivery L&N assigned the SDP35s to general freight service, installing radio control locomotive equipment in the steam generator compartment and using the engines in locotrol service until 1969. In 1966, when the EMD 645 prime mover superseded the EMD 567, the SDP35 was replaced in EMD's catalog by the EMD SDP40.

== Original owners ==
Railroad	Quantity	Road numbers	Notes
Seaboard Air Line Railroad	20	1100–1119	
Atlantic Coast Line Railroad	1	550	
Louisville and Nashville Railroad	4	1700–1703	
Union Pacific Railroad	10	1400–1409	
Total	35		

== Preservation ==
Seaboard Air Line Railroad 1114 is displayed by the depot in Hamlet, North Carolina. It is owned by the National Railroad Museum and Hall of Fame.
