= V20 engine =

Piston engine with two banks of ten cylinders in a "V" configuration

A V20 engine is a twenty-cylinder piston engine where two banks of ten cylinders are arranged in a V configuration around a common crankshaft. Large diesel V20 engines have been used in diesel locomotives, haul trucks, electric generators and marine applications.

== History ==
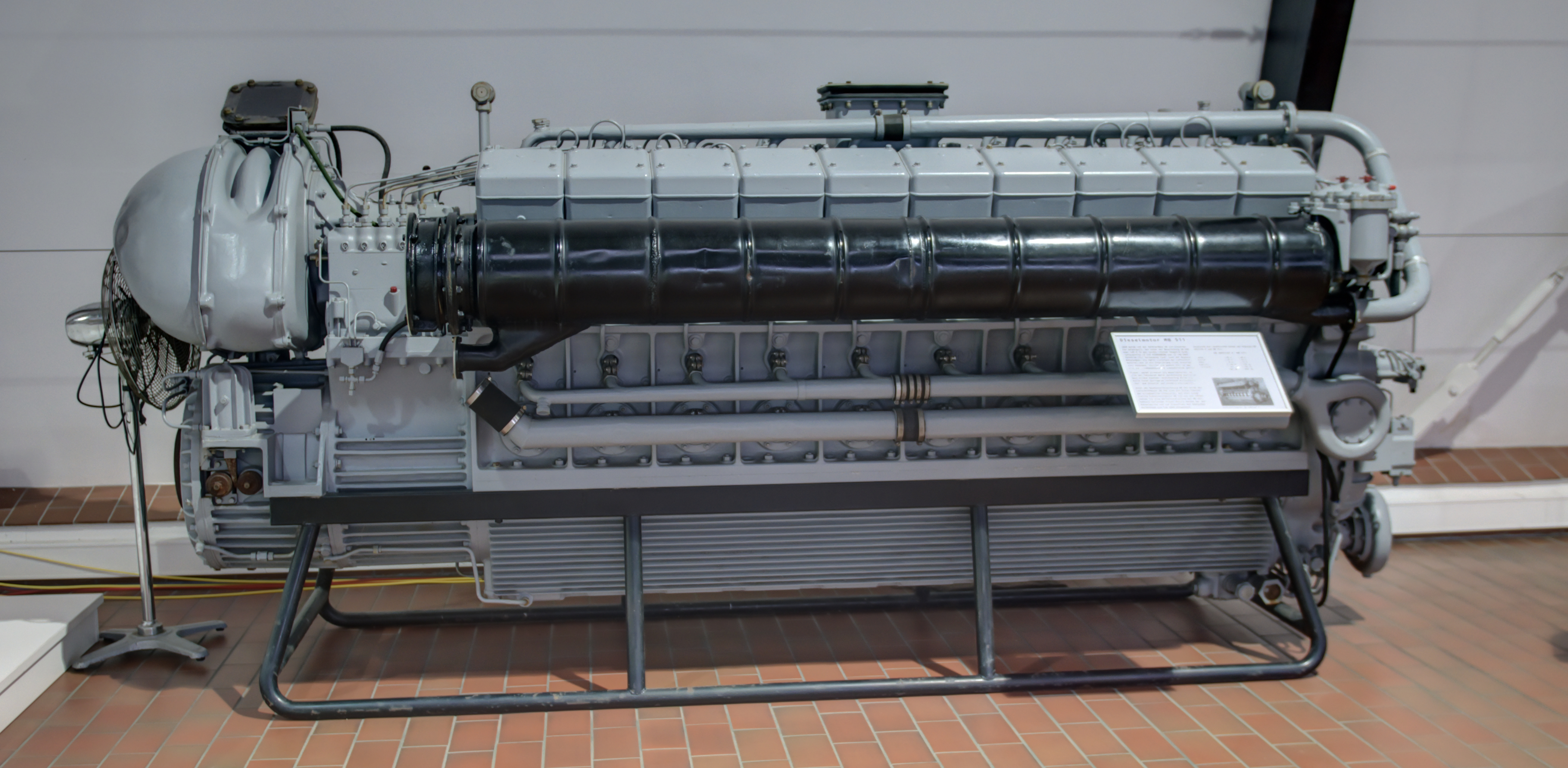
Mercedes-Benz MB 511 marine diesel engine

Beginning in the late-1930s, Mercedes-Benz produced several large V20 diesel engines for use in marine applications. The first engine was the MB 501 which was based on the MB 500 V12 engine and was installed in the 1937 class Schnellboot (fast attack boat) and several submarines. Later versions included the supercharged MB 511 engine and the MB 518, which also added an intercooler. A copy of the MB 511 was produced by VEB Motorenwerk in Ludwigsfelde and called the VEB 20 KVD 25. Production of the MB 518 resumed in 1951, and a version of the engine was also manufactured by MTU, called the MB 20 V 672.

The Electro-Motive Diesel EMD 645E3 two-stroke V20 turbo-diesel engine was used in 1960s diesel-electric locomotives such as the EMD SD45. The engine has a displacement of 211 L (12,876 cu in) and produces a net traction of 2.7 MW (3,600 hp). The maximum gross power output is closer to 5,000 hp when operated in self-test mode (with the generated output being dissipated by resistors). Later versions of the EMD 645 engine were used in the EMD SD45-2 and EMD SD45T-2 locomotives. EMD also produces a V20 version of the EMD 710 diesel engine, which was used in the 1995 EMD SD80MAC locomotive. The EMD 710 remains in production to this day, and is mostly used in power generation and marine propulsion.

The Detroit Diesel Series 149 20V149 has an output of 2,936 hp (2,189 kW) from a capacity of 2,980 cu in (48.8 L). It was discontinued in 2000.

Current production V20 diesel engines include the Fairbanks Morse FM | MAN 28/33D STC, FM | MAN 32/44CR, FM | MAN 175D, FM | COLT-PIELSTICK PA6B STC. Others are the Wärtsilä 20V32 which produces up to 9.8 MW (13,100 hp), the MTU 20V1163 6 MW (8,045 hp)MTU 20V4000 2.8 MW (3,755 hp), MTU 20V8000 10 MW (13,410 hp), Cummins 120.0L QSK120 (5,000 hp). Caterpillar C175-20 4 MW (5,364 hp) and the G3520 series.

== See also ==
- V engine
- Media related to V20 engines at Wikimedia Commons
