= EMD 567 =

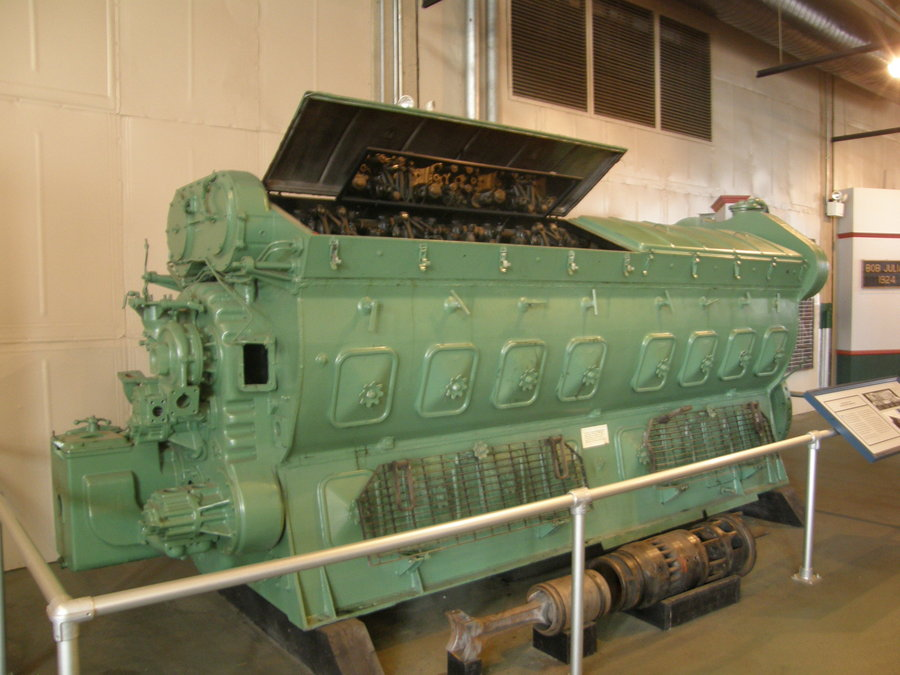
- An EMD 16-567B on display at the North Carolina Transportation Museum. Shown in the foreground is an exploded power assembly, with the piston, piston carrier and piston rod (fork type) on the left, and the cylinder liner and cylinder head on the right.

Overview
- Manufacturer: Electro-Motive Division of General Motors
- Also called: A-Engine, B-Engine, C-Engine, and D-Engine
- Production: 1938–1966

Layout
- Configuration: 45° Vee in V6, V8, V12, or V16
- Displacement: 3,405 to 9,080 cu in (55.8 to 148.8 L); 567.5 cu in (9.3 L) per cylinder
- Cylinder bore: 8 1/2 in (216 mm)
- Piston stroke: 10 in (250 mm)
- Valvetrain: Overhead camshaft, one per bank
- Compression ratio: 16:1 (Roots-style blower); 14.5:1 (turbocharged)

RPM range
- Idle speed: 180
- Max. engine speed: 900

Combustion
- Supercharger: One or two Roots-type
- Turbocharger: Single, clutch driven
- Fuel system: Unit injector actuated by engine camshaft
- Management: Woodward governor
- Fuel type: Diesel
- Oil system: Wet sump
- Cooling system: Liquid cooled

Output
- Power output: 156.25 hp per cylinder

Chronology
- Predecessor: Winton 201A
- Successor: EMD 645

The EMD 567 is a line of large medium-speed diesel engines built by General Motors' Electro-Motive Division. This engine, which succeeded Winton's 201A, was used in EMD's locomotives from 1938 until its replacement in 1966 by the EMD 645. It has a bore of 8 1/2 in (216 mm), a stroke of 10 in (254 mm) and a displacement of 567 cu in (9.29 L) per cylinder. Like the Winton 201A, the EMD 645 and the EMD 710, the EMD 567 is a two-stroke engine.

GE now makes EMD-compatible replacement parts.

== History ==
Eugene W. Kettering, son of Charles F. Kettering, joined Winton Engine in 1930. He moved to Detroit in 1936, and was a central figure in the development of the 567 and the Detroit Diesel 6-71. He moved to EMD in 1938, became chief engineer at EMD in 1948, then division director in 1956 and subsequently research assistant to the general manager in 1958 until his retirement in 1960. The 567 was released in 1938.

In 1951, Eugene Kettering presented a paper to the American Society of Mechanical Engineers entitled History and Development of the 567 Series General Motors Locomotive Engine, which goes into great detail about the technical obstacles that were encountered during the development of the 567 engine (these same considerations apply to the 645 and 710). The 567's designers started with a tabula rasa, systematically eliminating each of the 201A's many deficiencies which were preventing the earlier design from becoming successful in freight service, although the 201A was relatively successful in the less-demanding passenger and switching services. The 567 design had nothing in common with the 201A except the two-stroke cycle itself as every component of the 201A was replaced with a new design, even the "dipstick", to paraphrase one of Kettering's off-hand comments.

The 567 proved to be exceptionally successful in passenger, switching, freight, marine and stationary services, and, counting its two successors, the 645 and 710, which are not materially different from the 567 (all have the same external dimensions, differing mainly in per cylinder displacement), collectively have given nearly 80 years of exceptionally reliable service to those applications. As but one example of the achievements of the tabula rasa design: whereas the Winton 201A was doing very well with a 50,000-to-100,000-mile (80,000 to 161,000 km) piston lifetime, the 567 immediately achieved a 400,000-to-500,000-mile (640,000 to 800,000 km) piston lifetime, and in at least one case, reached a 1,000,000-mile (1,600,000 km) piston lifetime, a 10:1 to 20:1 improvement.

== Specification ==
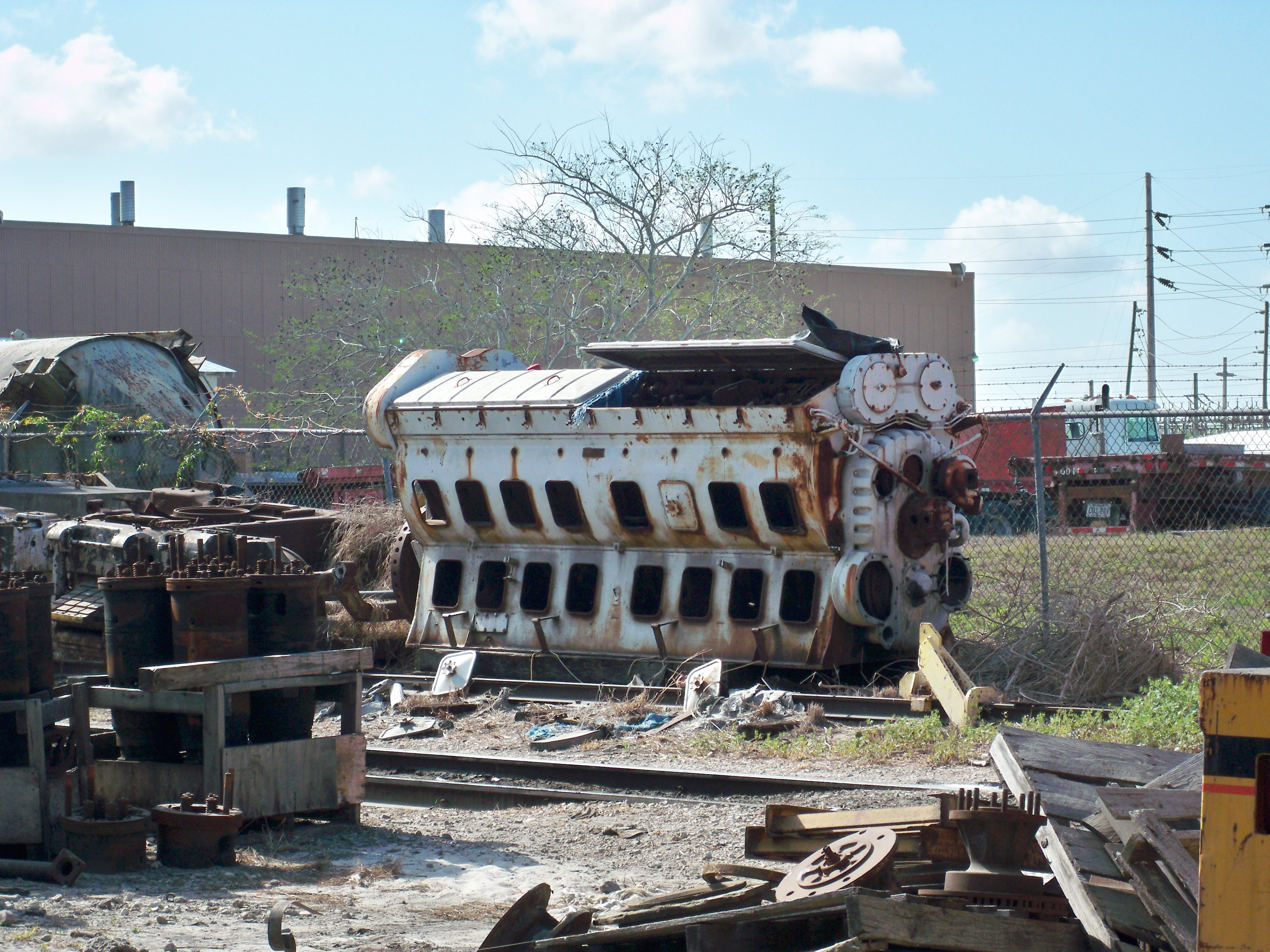
An EMD 16-567A at the Florida Central Railroad locomotive shops

All 567 engines are two-stroke V-engines with an angle of 45° between cylinder banks. The 201A was 60° between cylinder banks; 45° later proved to be significant when EMD subsequently adapted the road switcher concept for most of its locomotives, and which required the narrower (albeit taller) engine which 45° provides. The 710, 645, and 567 are the only two-stroke engines commonly used today in locomotives.

Schematic animation of a two-stroke uniflow diesel engine

The engine is a uniflow design with four poppet-type exhaust valves in the cylinder head. For maintenance, a power assembly, consisting of a cylinder head, cylinder liner, piston, piston carrier, and piston rod, can be individually and relatively easily and quickly replaced. The block is made from flat, formed and rolled structural steel members and steel forgings welded into a single structure (a "weldment"). Blocks may, therefore, be easily repaired, if required, using conventional shop tools. Each bank of cylinders has an overhead camshaft which operates the exhaust valves and the unit injectors.

The 567 is laid out with engine accessories (oil and water pumps and governors) at the "forward" end and the power take off at the "rear" end. The blowers and camshafts are at the "rear" end of the engine, with the blowers mounted above the power take off.

All engines have mechanically-controlled unit injectors (patented in 1934 by General Motors, EMD's former owner).

All 567 engines use forced induction, with either a Roots blower or a turbocharger. The turbocharger (a combination turbo-compressor system) follows EMD's innovative design that uses a gear train and over-running clutch to drive the compressor rotor during low engine speed, when exhaust gas temperature (and, correspondingly, heat energy) alone is insufficient to drive the turbine. At higher engine speeds, increased exhaust gas temperature is sufficient to drive the turbine and the clutch disengages, turning the turbo-compressor system into a true turbocharger. The turbo-compressor can revert to compressor mode momentarily during demands for large increases in engine output power. While more expensive to maintain than Roots blowers, the turbocharger significantly reduces fuel consumption and emissions, while improving high-altitude performance. Additionally, EMD's turbo-compressor can provide a 50 percent increase in maximum rated horsepower over Roots-blown engines for the same engine displacement.

Output for naturally aspirated engines (including Roots-blown two-stroke engines) is usually derated 2.5 percent per 1,000 feet (300 m) above mean sea level. Turbocharging effectively eliminates this derating.

== Modifications ==
567AC engines (an "A" block upgraded to "C" block specifications) and 567BC engines (a "B" block upgraded to "C" block specifications), both of which modifications eliminate the engine's "water deck" and substitute a "water manifold", as well as 567C and 567D engines, may be upgraded to use 645 power assemblies, theoretically achieving an increase in horsepower, but not without corresponding changes to the engine's Woodward governor which activates and controls the engine's "fuel rack". Although this power increase is not recommended, horsepower-for-horsepower updates (e.g., 2,000 hp or 1,500 kW 567D to 2,000 hp or 1,500 kW "645D"—645 power assemblies in a 567 block) are quite successful and common.

As 645 power assemblies are more readily available than 567 power assemblies, this upgrade may also be employed in so-called "life extension" programs, in which case the power assemblies would be upgraded, and the engine may be de-turbo-ed, without corresponding changes to the engine's Woodward governor, hence without a corresponding power increase.

Because of their age, 567 engines are generally exempt from emissions rules. EMD manufactures a special series of 645 power assemblies which are particularly useful in updating these exempt 567 engines and also certain exempt 645 engines.

== Versions ==
Numerous early improvements were aimed at increasing reliability and life, including a switch from the U-shaped top (exhaust) well to a V-shaped top well. This eliminated the cast top deck, which had been the source of some early-life failures, in favor of a top deck fabricated from plate steel. The 567 gave way to the 567A in 1941, which incorporated further top deck improvements and camshaft gear train changes. The 567B followed in 1946 with minor improvements. The 567C was released to further improve reliability and manufacturability. Visually, the 567C may be distinguished from earlier models by the presence of round (instead of square) handholes.

The cost of a 16-567 in 1941 was US$24,000, and a 16-567B in 1951 was US$32,905.

Engine model	Max RPM	Aspiration	Dates built	Compression ratio	6-cylinder		8-cylinder		12-cylinder.		16-cylinder		Notes
Engine model	Max RPM	Aspiration	Dates built	Compression ratio	hp	kW	hp	kW	hp	kW	hp	kW	Notes
567	800	Roots blown	9/38-3/43	16:1	600	447			1,000	746	1,350	1,007	"U" Deck or "V" Deck versions were built with rectangular hand hole covers.
567A	800	Roots blown	5/43-9/53	16:1	600	447			1,000; 1,200	746; 895	1,350	1,007	Rectangular hand hole covers.
567B	800	Roots blown	7/45-3/54	16:1	600	447	800	597	1,000; 1,125; 1,200	746; 839; 895	1,350; 1,500; 1,600	1,007; 1,119; 1,193	Rectangular hand hole covers.
567C	800; 835	Roots blown	3/53-2/66	16:1	600	447	900	671	1,125; 1,200	839; 895	1,500; 1,750	1,119; 1,305	New crankcase design with round hand hole covers and replacing the water deck with water manifold piping.
567AC	800	Roots blown	8/53-6/61	16:1	600	447			1,000	746			Rebuild of 567A block to incorporate water manifold piping and to use 567C or certain 645 power assemblies
567BC	800	Roots blown	9/53-10/63	16:1					1,125; 1,200	839; 895	1,500	1,119	Production engine from September 1953 to May 1954 then used to rebuild 567Bs block to incorporate water manifold piping and to use 567C or certain 645 power assemblies
567CR	835	Roots blown	10/56-11/65	16:1			900	671					"Rebalanced"
567D1	835	Roots blown	12/59-11/65	20:1					1,325	988	1,800	1,342	
567D2	835	Turbocharged	11/59-4/62	14.5:1							2,000	1,491	De-turbo-ed versions using 645 power assemblies, but still rated 2,000 hp are quite common
567D3	835	Turbocharged	7/58-11/63	14.5:1							2,250; 2,400	1,678; 1,790	De-turbo-ed versions using 645 power assemblies, but re-rated 2,000 hp are very rare
567D3A	900	Turbocharged	7/63-1/66	14.5:1							2,500	1,864	De-turbo-ed versions using 645 power assemblies, but re-rated 2,000 hp are somewhat common
567E	835	Roots blown	2/66-4/66	16:1					1,200	895	2,000 (Note: Figure from 16V 567E engine installed in RENFE Class 319.2)	1,491	645E block with 567C power assemblies

== Stationary/marine versions ==
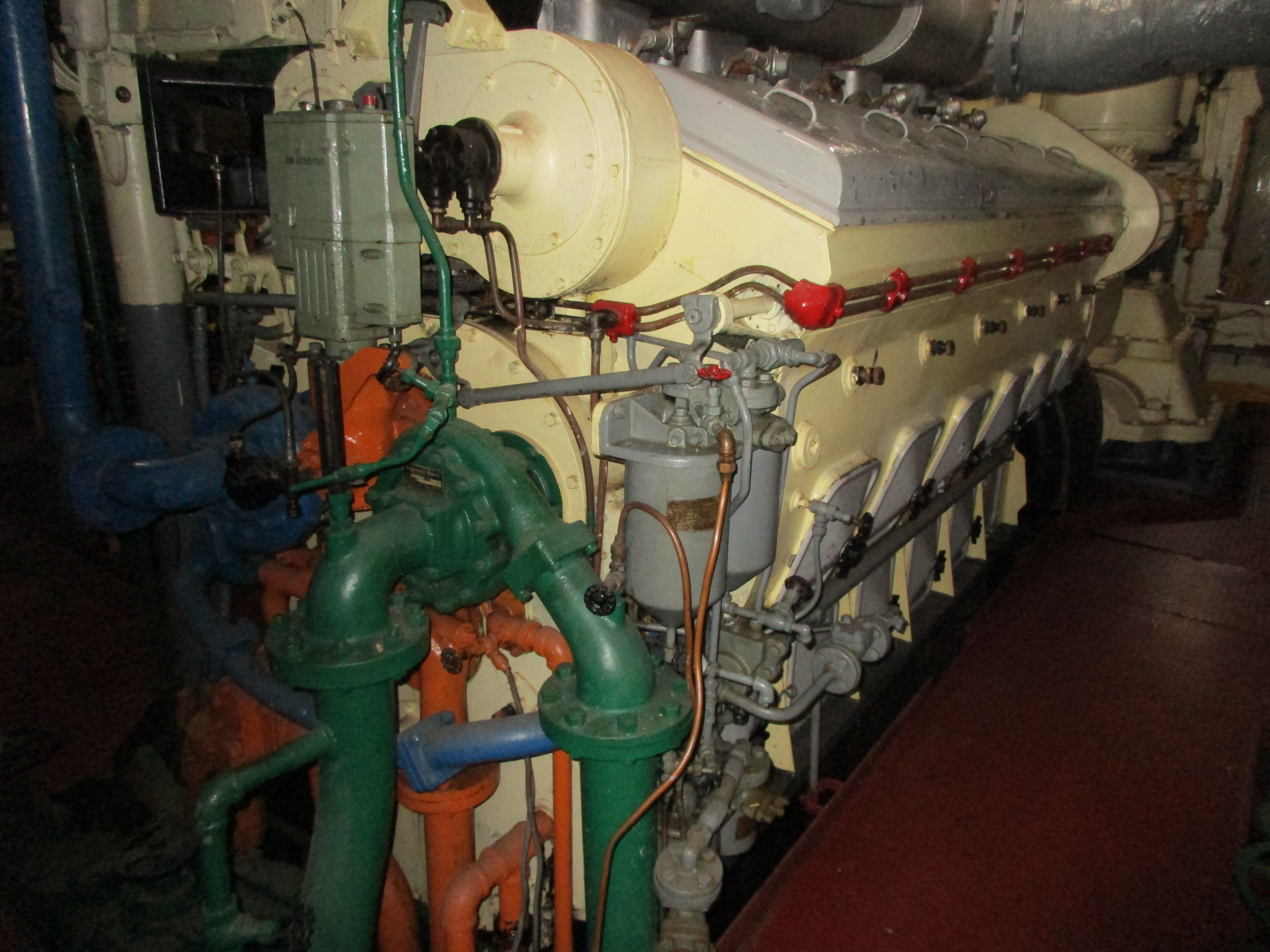
A GM EMD 12-567ATLP diesel engine as installed in LST 393 (Landing Ship Tank), located in Muskegon, Michigan, July 2017

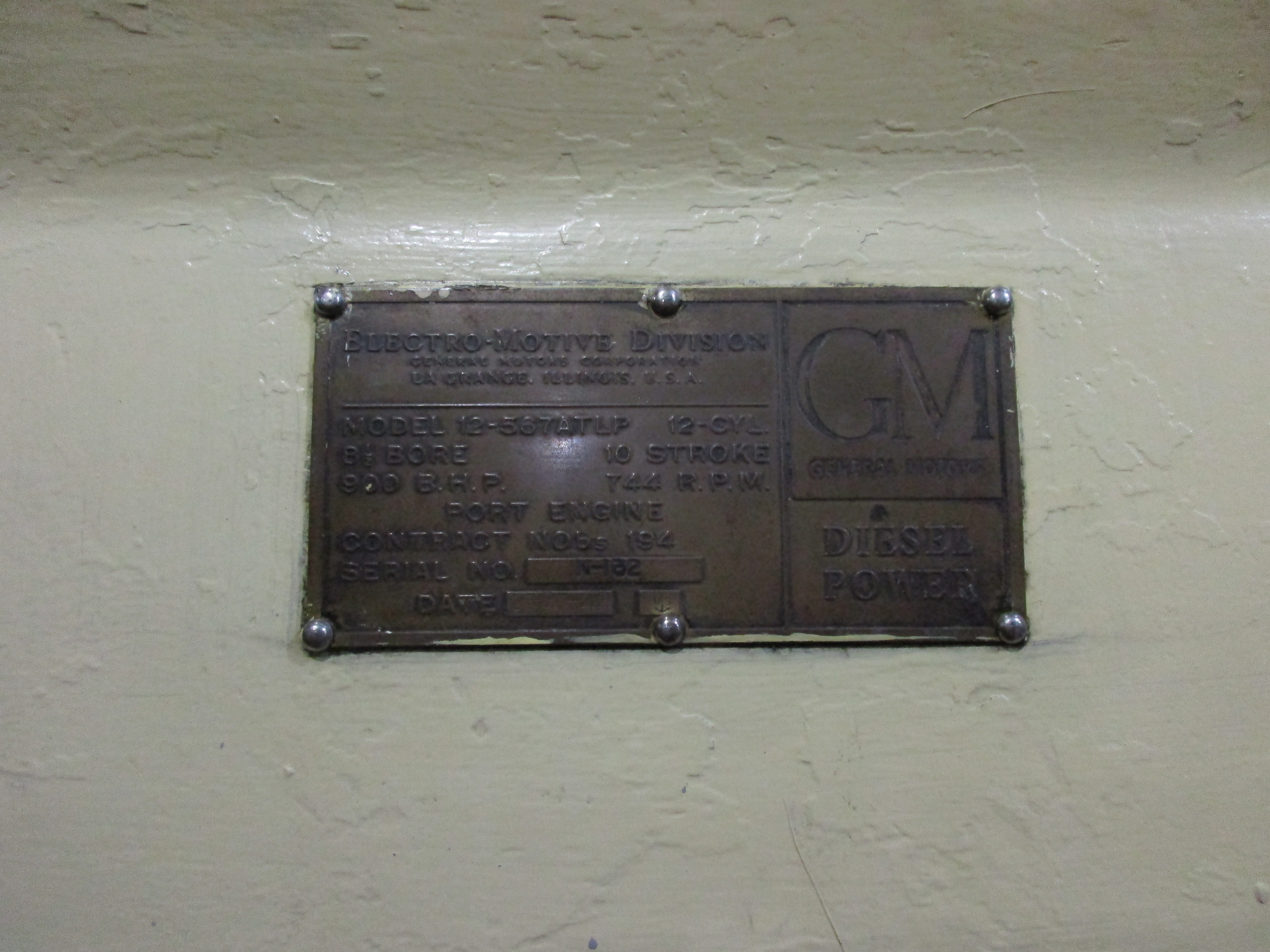
Engine ID tag from the LST393 port engine, showing the power rating of 900 hp at 744 rpm

Like most EMD engines, the 567 was also sold for stationary and marine applications. Stationary and marine installations were available with either a left or right-hand rotating engine.

Marine engines differ from railroad and stationary engines mainly in the shape and depth of the engine's oil sump, which was altered to accommodate the rolling and pitching motions encountered in marine applications.

== 567 locomotive models ==
An EMD locomotive catalog, contemporary with the 567, lists the following models:

Locomotive	Prime Mover	Horsepower	Kilowatts	Purpose	Notes
F9	16-567C	1,750	1,305	4-motor Freight or Passenger (Blomberg B trucks) (Note: Blomberg B trucks are common on competitive road switchers, e.g. early ALCo and GE four-axle road switchers, as many purchasers elected to re-use traded-in Blomberg B trucks; otherwise AAR Type B road trucks are often found; Indeed a few EMD road locomotives were supplied with reclaimed AAR Type B road trucks, mainly to save cost.)	Derivatives FP9 and FL9 also produced, FL9 using Flexicoil Trucks
G8	8-567C	1,067	796	4-motor General Purpose Road Switcher (Blomberg B trucks)	
G12	12-567C	1,067	796	4-motor General Purpose Road Switcher (Blomberg B trucks)	
GP7	16-567B	1,500	1,119	4-motor General Purpose Road Switcher (Blomberg B trucks)	
GP9	16-567C	1,750	1,305	4-motor General Purpose Road Switcher (Blomberg B trucks)	
SD7	16-567B	1,500	1,119	6-Motor Special Duty Road Switcher (Blomberg Flexicoil C trucks)	
SD9	16-567C	1,750	1,305	6-Motor Special Duty Road Switcher (Blomberg Flexicoil C trucks)	
SD18	16-567D1	1,800	1,342	6-Motor Special Duty Road Switcher (Blomberg Flexicoil C trucks)	
SD24	16-567D3	2,400	1,790	6-Motor Special Duty Road Switcher (Blomberg Flexicoil C trucks)	
SD28	16-567D1	1,800	1,342	6-Motor Special Duty Road Switcher (Blomberg Flexicoil C trucks)	
SDP28	16-567D1	1,800	1,342	6-Motor Special Duty Road Switcher (Blomberg Flexicoil C trucks)	
SD35	16-567D3A	2,500	1,864	6-Motor Special Duty Road Switcher (Blomberg Flexicoil C trucks)	
SDP35	16-567D3A	2,500	1,864	6-Motor Special Duty Road Switcher (Blomberg Flexicoil C trucks)	
E6	12-567 or 12-567A (x2)	2,000	1,491	4-Motor Passenger Locomotive (Blomberg A1A trucks)	
E9	12-567C (x2)	2,400	1,790	4-Motor Passenger Locomotive (Blomberg A1A trucks)	
NW2	16-567A	1,000	746	115-Ton Yard Switcher (AAR type A truck, Flexicoil B optional)	
NW3	16-567	1,000	746	115-Ton Yard Switcher (AAR type A truck, Flexicoil B optional)	
NW5	16-567B	1,000	746	115-Ton Yard Switcher (AAR type A truck, Flexicoil B optional)	
SW1	6-567B	600	447	115-Ton Yard Switcher (AAR type A truck, Flexicoil B optional)	
SW7	12-567B	1,200	895	115-Ton Yard Switcher (AAR type A truck, Flexicoil B optional)	
SW8	8-567B	800	597	115-Ton Yard Switcher (AAR type A truck, Flexicoil B optional)	
SW9	12-567B	1,200	895	115-Ton Yard Switcher (AAR type A truck, Flexicoil B optional)	
SW600	6-567C	600	447	100-Ton Yard Switcher (Blomberg AAR Type A switcher trucks) (Note: Blomberg Flexicoil B lightweight road trucks were optional.)	
SW900	8-567C	900	671	115-Ton Yard Switcher (AAR type A truck, Flexicoil B optional)	
SW1200	12-567C	1,200	895	125-Ton Yard Switcher (AAR type A truck, Flexicoil B optional)	
GP18	16-567D1	1,800	1,342	4-motor General Purpose Road Switcher (Blomberg B trucks)	
GP20	16-567D2	2,000	1,491	4-motor General Purpose Road Switcher (Blomberg B trucks)	
GP28	16-567D1	1,800	1,342	4-motor General Purpose Road Switcher (Blomberg B trucks)	
GP30	16-567D3	2,250	1,678	4-Motor Freight Locomotive (AAR type A truck, Flexicoil B optional)	
GP35	16-567D3A	2,500	1,864	4-Motor Freight Locomotive (AAR type A truck, Flexicoil B optional)	
BL2	16-567B	1,500	1,100	4-Axle Road Switcher (B-B Configuration)	
Indian locomotive class YDM-5	12-567C	1,390	1,037	Mainline export meter gauge mixed traffic locomotive	
NOHAB AA16 (built with license from EMD/GM)	16-567B, 16-567C and 16-567D	1,500 (567B), 1,700 (567C), 1,950 (567D)	1,100 (567B)	(A1A)(A1A) configuration diesel electric locomotives built for passenger and freight services.	The locomotives are based on the EMD F7. It was designed for DSB, Denmark as Class MY and was first built in 1954, with number 1101 to be the first unit of all AA16's. Later exported around Europe as Di3 (NSB, Norway) and M61 (MAV, Hungary), 202 (SNCB, Belgium) 1600 (CFL, Luxembourg).
Nohab AA12 (Class MX) (Built with license from EMD/GM)	12-567C (Mx 1001 - 1021), 12-567D (Mx 1022 - 1045)	1,425 (567C), 1,445 (567D)		Locomotives based on the design of Nohab AA16, slightly lighter due to use for branchlines in Denmark.	The locomotives were initially built for use in Denmark, but some units have been sold to Sweden under the designation TMX.
SJ class T43 (Built by Nohab with license from GM 1961-1963)	12-567D1	1,450	1,065	Bo'Bo' road switcher. One locomotive was equipped with heating for passenger coaches. Mostly used for freight service and switching.	
ÖBB 2050 (Build by Henschel with license from EMD/GM)	12-567C	1,520	1,119	Bo'Bo' locomotives based on Prototype G12 7707 for mixed traffic use, later only goods service.	Only engine, generator and motors from GM

Most 567C locomotive models used D37B traction motors until mid 1959 when the D47B traction motor was used in production locomotives. Very early 567C locomotives from 1953 used the D27B traction motor.

== 567C and 567D engine maintenance ==
These two models are by far the most maintainable, with many 645 service parts being rather easily fitted to C and D engines.

The 567D's turbocharger is perhaps the least maintainable part of such an engine, and the 567D turbo has many more maintenance issues than 645E and later turbos. A common choice is conversion of a 567D turbo engine to Roots-blown, thereby abandoning the turbo and its many issues. Installation of 645 power assemblies will still allow Roots-converted 4-axle locomotives (GP20s) to produce 2,000 hp (1,500 kW), as does a Roots-blown 16-645E, thereby becoming the functional equivalent of a GP38, although with older electrical equipment and controls, and, of course, the older carbody.

Many EMD locomotives with C and D engines are still operating, particularly as their relatively light weight (about 260,000 pounds or 120,000 kilograms) is of significant benefit to shortline and industrial operators.

== See also ==
- EMD 645
- EMD 710
- EMD 1010
