= Max Ephraim Jr =

Max Ephraim, Jr. (1918-2001) was an American railroad mechanical engineer who played a significant role in the transition from steam-powered to diesel-electric locomotives during the 1950s.

== Early life ==
Max Ephraim was born to Max and Margaret at Washington Park Hospital on October 15, 1918 and raised on the South Side (Chicago) along with two brothers. His father was Jewish and his mother Irish, and he experienced the discrimination common to both groups at the time. He graduated from Harper High School in February 1936. Ephraim attended “Illinois Institute of Technology” and graduated first in his mechanical engineering class and second in the entire Class of 1939 —all while editing the school newspaper, playing intramural sports, participating in the Rho Delta Rho fraternity, working two jobs to pay his way through school, and within 3 ½ years. Max received offers from Pullman-Standard, American Air Filter, and Electro-Motive Corporation.

== Early career ==
Ephraim started his career at the Electro-Motive Corporation of General Motors on Monday June 12, 1939, just a few days after closing out his student days at IIT. He was assigned as a draftsman, the entry position for a mechanical engineer, at a monthly wage of $125.00. Initially he was with the Power Product section where diesel-electric generators were designed as stand-by power for clients such as telephone companies. He later worked with Richard Dilworth and Martin P Blomberg in developing and improving EMD's diesel-electric locomotives. As he became financially stable with EMD, he and Audrey were married on Nov 22, 1941.

== Navy service ==
During World War II, Ephraim accepted a commission with the US Navy in 1943. His initial assignment was at the Navy installation in Mechanicsburg PA. For sea duty, he was assigned to the Pacific Theater as an engineering officer aboard the USS PCE-843, a 185-foot Patrol Craft Escort of the corvette type that was laid down on 25 June 1943 and delivered to the US Navy on Jan 30, 1944 by Pullman-Standard.

== Career ==
Ephraim returned to EMD where he was assigned as project manager for the NW5. The NW5 was an early concept road-switcher, and was used to switch passenger cars at major passenger stations such as Chicago's Union Station. After the NW5, he headed development of the Branch Line locomotives – BL1 and BL2. The BL models were intended to address the shortcomings of a car body style locomotive. They provided superior visibility to their car body styled counterparts, while also eliminating the requirement to be turned around for a return trip on the same rail. Electro-Motive subsequently mothballed the BL2 and replaced it with the GP7.

In 1955, Ephraim became the locomotive section engineer. In 1959, he led a team in the development of turbocharger for the EMD 567 engine and was promoted to assistant chief engineer. In 1973, just as the Dash 2 series of diesel-electric locomotives were moving tonnage across the land, he became the chief engineer. He retired from EMD in 1983.

After his retirement from EMD, Ephraim became chairman of the board of Modern Process Equipment, Inc. (MPE) of Chicago, Illinois, a family owned firm managed by his sons.

== Death ==
In 1989, Ephraim's wife suffered a stroke. She recovered and he became her primary caregiver. She died in 1999. Ephraim died on September 16, 2001, of kidney failure at the age of 82.

== Honors ==
Ephraim was elected a fellow in the American Society of Mechanical Engineers, and was honored with the Professional Achievement Award from the Illinois Institute of Technology. The Max Ephraim, Jr. Conference Room at the McCormick Tribune Campus Center on The Illinois Institute of Technology campus is named in his honor. Endowed Max Ephraim scholarships have been established at IIT and Evangel University.
