= EMD SD24 =

American diesel-electric locomotives

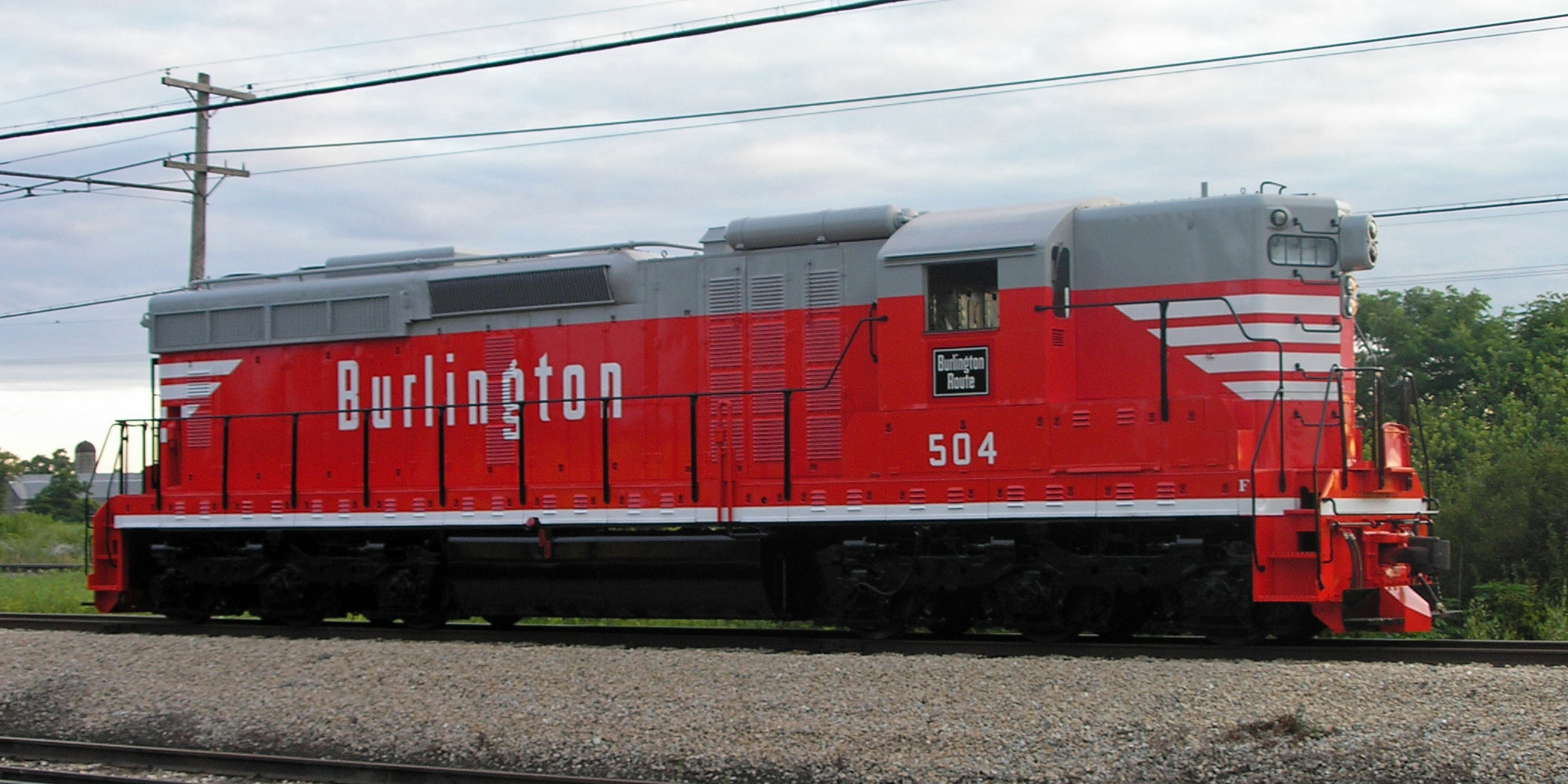
- Chicago Burlington & Quincy 504, at the Illinois Railway Museum, July 19, 2009; Note the "F" on the sill under the short high hood, indicating the "front" of the locomotive
Type and origin
- Power type: Diesel-electric
- Builder: General Motors Electro-Motive Division (EMD)
- Model: SD24
- Build date: July 1958 – March 1963
- Total produced: 224, 179 A units, 45 B units
Specifications
- Configuration
  - AAR: C-C
- Gauge: 4 ft 8 1/2 in (1,435 mm) standard gauge
- Prime mover: EMD 16-567D3
- Engine type: V16 diesel
- Aspiration: Turbocharged
- Cylinders: 16
Performance figures
- Power output: 2,400 hp (1.8 MW)
Career
- Locale: United States

The EMD SD24 is a 2,400 hp (1,800 kW) six-axle (C-C) diesel-electric locomotive built by General Motors' Electro-Motive Division of La Grange, Illinois between July 1958 and March 1963. A total of 224 units were built for customers in the United States, comprising 179 regular, cab-equipped locomotives and 45 cabless B units. The latter were built solely for the Union Pacific Railroad.

The SD24 was the first EMD production locomotive to be built with an EMD turbocharged diesel engine. The first SD24 was built sixteen months before the four-axle (B-B) model GP20. Power output of the SD24 was 33 percent higher than the 1,800 hp (1,340 kW) of the concurrent Roots blower-equipped SD18s with the same engine displacement. The SD24 has 400 hp (298 kW) per axle, limited by the traction motors available. Nevertheless, the turbocharged SD24 provides full rated power at all altitudes, which the Roots-blown SD18 could not provide.

In terms of sales, the SD24 was only a moderate success, and had average service lives in SD24 configuration (though a few non-turbocharged rebuilds are still in operation), but the SD24 was a milestone in EMD locomotive development and the forerunner to today's high-powered six-axle locomotives.

EMD thought the Duluth, Missabe & Iron Range Railway would want to start purchasing the SD24 and sent the first demonstrator to the DMIR painted in the road's livery. The DMIR did not end up purchasing the SD24 and the demonstrator went to the Union Pacific Railroad.

== EMD-type Turbo-Compressor (Turbocharger) ==
The turbocharger was the then-new EMD mechanically assisted turbo-compressor. During engine startup, and at lower power levels, during which there is not sufficient exhaust heat energy to drive the turbine fast enough for the compressor to supply the air necessary for combustion, the engine drives the compressor through a gear train and an overrunning clutch. At higher power levels, the overrunning clutch is disengaged, and the turbo-compressor operates as a true turbocharger. It is possible for the turbo-compressor to revert to compressor mode momentarily during commands for large increases in engine power. Turbocharging provides higher horsepower and good running characteristics at all altitudes. Turbocharging also improves fuel consumption and reduces emissions.

Previous Union Pacific experiments with turbocharging had used multiple Elliot or Garrett AiResearch turbochargers feeding the usual pair of Roots blowers. EMD's mechanically assisted turbocharger eliminated the need for the pair of Roots blowers and also integrated the turbocharging function from two (Elliot) or four (AiResearch) smaller add-on turbochargers into one much larger, turbo-compressor (turbocharger) with intercooling.

The introduction of the EMD-type turbocharger was successful and all subsequent SD series were offered with this turbocharger, although not all models within a series were offered with turbocharging (e.g., the 38 sub-models within the 40 Series were Roots-blown).

== Options ==
Optional equipment that could be specified by ordering railroads included multiple unit controls, a steam generator, dynamic brakes, winterization equipment, an air signal line, and hump control. Despite the options the vast majority were similar in configuration.

The standard fuel tank offered a 1,200-US-gallon (1,000 imp gal; 4,500 L) capacity, while 2,400-or-3,000-US-gallon (2,000 or 2,500 imp gal; 9,100 or 11,400 L) tanks were optional. In practice, all SD24s ordered had the 3,000-US-gallon (2,500 imp gal; 11,000 L) tank except for the last built, Kennecott Copper's single locomotive. In order to provide room for a larger fuel tank, the air reservoirs were relocated on the roof just behind the locomotive's cab. The tanks were known as "torpedo tubes" due to their long, thin design.

Winterization included a winterization hatch over one of the radiator fans, to direct warm air back into the engine compartment.

Either a low or high short hood could be ordered; in either case, the short hood was front by default. The Burlington, Southern and first EMD demonstrator had high short hoods; all others were low short hood. Low short hoods from the factory had a pronounced downward slope of the top towards the nose, as did those of the contemporary GP20. Many of the high short hood units had their noses chopped later on, often as a consequence of rebuilding; these as a rule have flat-topped short hoods.

== Original purchasers ==
Table of original purchasers
Photograph	Railroad	Qty	Road numbers	Notes
	Atchison, Topeka and Santa Fe Railway	80	900–979	
	Chicago, Burlington and Quincy Railroad	16	500–515	High short hood, to Burlington Northern 6240–6255.
	General Motors-EMD (demonstrators)	4	5579 and 7200–7202	5579 first SD24 built, high hood; 7200–7202 next to last built, low hood with Southern Pacific paint scheme. All sold to UP as numbers 448 (EMD 5579) and 445 – 447 (EMD 7200 – 7202).
	Kennecott Copper	1	904	Last SD24 ordered, turbocharging required due to high altitude operation. Small fuel tank fitted, only SD24 not to have "torpedo tube" air reservoirs. No MU fitted.
	Southern Railway	23	2502–2524	High short hood
	Southern Railway (CNO&TP)	21	6305–6325	High short hood
	Southern Railway (NO&NE)	4	6950–6953	High short hood
	Union Pacific Railroad	A units 30; B units 45	A units 400–429, B units 400B–444B	
	Totals	224		

== Rebuilds ==
As the SD24 locomotives aged, they began to develop reliability problems, especially electrical ones. In addition, the extra maintenance requirements of the turbocharged engine were acceptable when they were some of the most powerful locomotives available, but in secondary service, they were an expensive way to get 2,400 hp (1,800 kW). Thus, a large number of SD24s were rebuilt by various owners to extend their lives.

=== Illinois Central Gulf SD20 ===
From August 1979 through December 1982, the Illinois Central Gulf Railroad rebuilt various C-C locomotives (the EMD SD24, the EMD SD24B, the EMD SD7, and the EMD SD35) to 2000 horsepower road switchers powered by EMD 645E prime movers, resulting in the EMD SD20. All units had the electricals upgraded to Dash 2 technology, and the turbocharger was removed on the SD24s and SD35s. 35 of the 42 SD20s built were rebuilt from either the SD24 or the SD24B. Illinois Central, the successor to the ICG, retired them in 1995. They later found work on shortlines such as the Chicago & Illinois Midland, the Wisconsin Southern (WSOR), the Iowa Interstate (IAIS), and the Indiana Harbor Belt. These units are slowly being retired, with the IAIS and WSOR having completely removed them from their rosters. The IHB has only 3 left, and the CIM (now the Illinois Midland) retains only 1 of their 5.

=== Santa Fe SD26 ===
From January 1973 through January 1978 the Atchison, Topeka and Santa Fe Railway rebuilt its fleet of eighty SD24 locomotives, naming the resulting type the SD26. The rebuild boosted the power output of the locomotives by upgrading the 16-567D3 engines with EMD 645 power assemblies. Other work improved the reliability by replacing the entire electrical systems, and replacing the multiple body-side vents with a central air filtration system. The large box fitted high on the body behind the cab for the air filters required relocating the "torpedo tube" air reservoirs further back on the long hood, and gave the SD26 a noticeable "hump-backed" appearance. One unit was wrecked, 44 were traded to EMD in 1985 and 35 were sold to Guilford Rail System in 1986. All have since been scrapped.

=== Union Pacific SD24M ===
The Union Pacific Railroad modified three SD24 locomotives experimentally to see if it would be worthwhile to upgrade their fleet of 30 such locomotives.

Unit 410 received the most minor modification: upgraded air filters.

UP 423, however, was substantially rebuilt to UP 3100 in August 1968 with a constant-speed 16-645 3,000 hp (2,240 kW) prime mover, a new alternator and new traction motors. With the constant-speed engine, speed control was via changing the level of excitation of the alternator; the traction motors were permanently wired in parallel. New, variable dynamic brakes were also fitted, as was a self load feature enabling testing under load without an external electrical load apparatus. This latter feature became standard on later locomotive models. The constant-speed prime mover, on the other hand, was not successful enough to duplicate. From 1975, the locomotive was used as a heavy switcher at UP's North Platte, Nebraska hump yards, a fate common to UP's other surviving SD24s.

UP 414 did not receive as major a modification as #423, but it was refitted with a 16-645 engine, AR10 alternator and Dash Two electrical cabinet in May 1974, making it effectively an EMD SD40-2. This was a testbed for a proposed upgrade of all UP's SD24s, but UP decided not to go ahead with the work. Both UP 3100 and UP 414 were classified as "SD24m" by the UP, but some UP internal documents class UP 414 as a "SD24-4".

=== CNW SD18R ===
Several high-nose Southern SD24s were rebuilt by the Milwaukee Road and Morrison Knudsen for Precision National's lease fleet in 1979. The turbochargers and dynamic brakes were removed, and Precision gave them class SD10. In 1980 more followed, though they were low-nose units of Union Pacific origin. In 1982 the Chicago & North Western bought 22 of the high-nose and four of the low-nose units. Producing 1,800 horsepower (1,340 kW) (without the turbocharger), they were designated model SD18R - not to be confused with actual SD18 locomotives as manufactured by General Motors Electro-Motive Division.

== Preservation ==
At least three SD24s survive in museums:

- Chicago Burlington & Quincy 504, later Burlington Northern 6244 (which can be seen in the movie Groundhog Day), is preserved in operating condition at the Illinois Railway Museum.
- Wisconsin Central 2402, ex Fox River Valley Railroad 2402, built as Burlington 510, is at the National Railroad Museum in Green Bay, WI, mechanically complete except for traction motors, its currently being restored back to its Fox River Valley Railroad appearance. It previously operated at Steamtown NHS dressed as DL&W #880.
- Will County Coal Handling 1802, originally Union Pacific 427B and later rebuilt into an SD20 for the Illinois Central Gulf Railroad as their 2002, was acquired by the Illinois Railway Museum in June of 2026. The museum plans to repaint the unit to its Illinois Central Gulf appearance.
