= EMD SD20 =

American diesel-electric locomotives

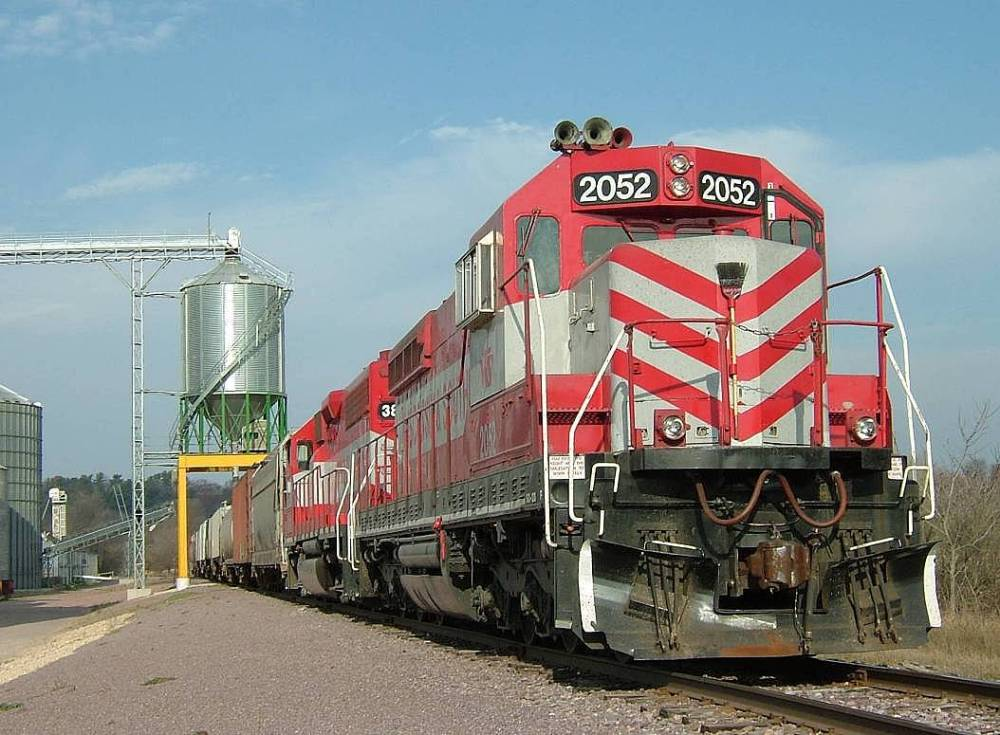
- A Wisconsin and Southern Railroad grain train loads at a co-op in Rock Springs, Wisconsin.
Type and origin
- Power type: Diesel-electric
- Builder: General Motors Electro-Motive Division (EMD)
- Model: SD20
- Total produced: 42
- Rebuild date: August 1979 - December 1982
Specifications
- Configuration
  - AAR: C-C
- Gauge: 4 ft 8 1/2 in (1,435 mm) standard gauge
- Engine type: V16 diesel engine
- Cylinders: 16
Career
- Operators: Illinois Central Gulf Railroad
- Locale: United States
- Disposition: Several still in service, one preserved

The EMD SD20 is the product of a rebuilding program by the Illinois Central Gulf's Paducah Shops as a conversion from the EMD SD7, EMD SD24, SD24B (cabless), and EMD SD35 locomotives. The program involved rebuilding the 567 engine to 645E with 2000 horsepower rating, eliminating the turbocharger if equipped with one, upgrading the electronics to Dash 2 technology, and adding cabs to the B units. A total of 42 units were rebuilt. Original heritage of the rebuilt units was 3 Union Pacific SD7s, 4 Union Pacific SD24s, 10 Union Pacific SD24Bs, 21 Southern SD24s, and 4 Baltimore and Ohio SD35s. Many of the units to be rebuilt were purchased from Precision National. Three of the ex-Southern SD24s wore Precision reporting marks. The locomotives were rebuilt between August 1979 and December 1982. Road Numbers assigned were 2000–2041. Unit 2041 was the last Paducah rebuild.

== Usage ==
Many SD20s are still in use with leasing companies and regional and shortline railroads. The Wisconsin and Southern Railroad and Indiana Harbor Belt were both notable second and third owners of the SD20. On January 22, 2008, the Wisconsin Southern ran its last run using an SD20, all have now been sold.

== Preservation ==
One SD20 has been preserved. Originally built as SD24B 427B for Union Pacific in 1959, it was outshopped by Illinois Central Gulf as SD20 2002. It was last used at the Will County Generating Station in Romeoville, Illinois and was donated by NRG to the Illinois Railway Museum in June 2026. Plans call for the locomotive to eventually be restored back to its Illinois Central Gulf Railroad appearance.
