= EMD GP20 =

American diesel locomotive

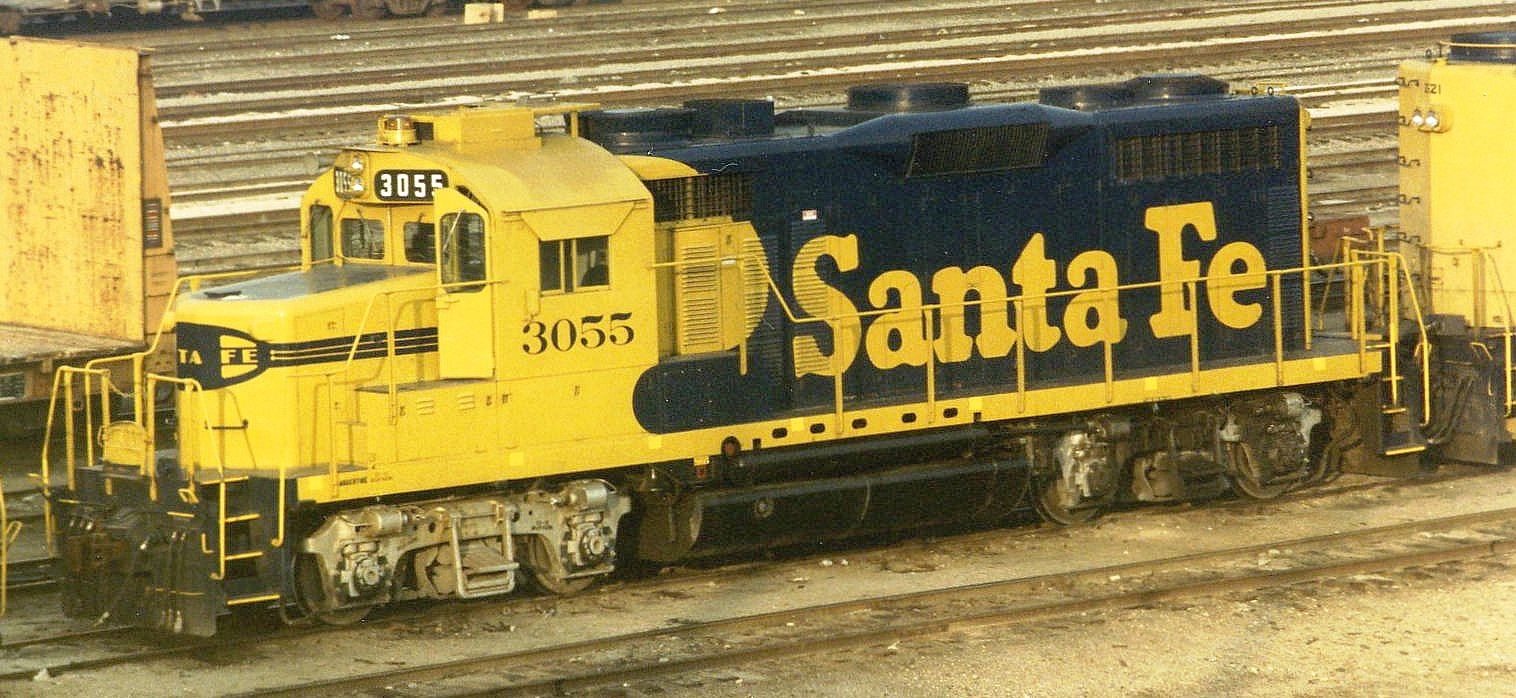
- ATSF 3055 in San Bernardino, California
Type and origin
- Power type: Diesel-electric
- Builder: General Motors Electro-Motive Division (EMD)
- Model: GP20
- Build date: November 1959 to April 1962
- Total produced: 260
Specifications
- Configuration
  - AAR: B-B
  - UIC: Bo′Bo′
- Gauge: 4 ft 8 1/2 in (1,435 mm)
- Length: 56 ft 2 in (17.12 m)
- Width: 10 ft 3 in (3.12 m)
- Height: 14 ft 6 in (4.42 m)
- Loco weight: 240,000 lb (108,862 kg)
- Fuel capacity: 2,350 US gal (8,896 L; 1,957 imp gal)
- Lubricant cap.: 227 US gal (859 L; 189 imp gal)
- Coolant cap.: 220 US gal (833 L; 183 imp gal)
- Sandbox cap.: 18 cu ft (0.51 m^{3})
- Prime mover: EMD 16-567D2
- Engine type: Two-stroke V16 diesel
- Aspiration: Turbocharged
- Displacement: 9,072 cu in (148.66 L)
- Generator: EMD D-22
- Traction motors: EMD D47 (4) or D57 (4)
- Cylinders: 16
- Cylinder size: 8 1/2 in × 10 in (216 mm × 254 mm)
- Transmission: Diesel electric
- Loco brake: Schedule 24RL or 26L Straight air, optional: dynamic
Performance figures
- Maximum speed: 65 mph (105 km/h)
- Power output: 2,000 hp (1.5 MW)
- Tractive effort: Starting: 63,375 lbf (28,746 kgf) Continuous: 45,000 lbf (20,412 kgf) @9.3 mph (15.0 km/h)
Career
- Locale: United States

The EMD GP20 is a 4-axle diesel-electric locomotive built by General Motors' Electro-Motive Division between November 1959 and April 1962. Power was provided by an EMD 16-567D2 16-cylinder turbocharged engine which generated 2,000 horsepower (1,500 kW). EMD was initially hesitant to turbocharge their 567-series diesel engine, but was spurred on to do so following successful tests made by Union Pacific in the form of UP's experimental Omaha GP20 units. 260 examples of EMD's production locomotive model (with the EMD turbocharger) were built for American railroads.

The GP20 was the second EMD production locomotive to be built with an EMD turbocharged diesel engine, sixteen months after the six-axle (C-C) model SD24. Power output of the turbocharged SD24 was 33 percent higher than the 1,800 hp (1,340 kW) of the concurrent Roots blower-equipped SD18s with the same engine displacement, 400 hp (298 kW) per axle, but the power output of the turbocharged GP20 was only 11 percent higher than the 1,800 hp (1,340 kW) of the concurrent Roots blower-equipped GP18s with the same engine displacement 500 hp (373 kW) per axle, due to the limitations of the traction motors then available. Nevertheless, the turbocharged GP20 provided full-rated power at all altitudes, which the Roots-blown GP18 could not provide.

== EMD-type Turbo-Compressor (Turbocharger) ==
The turbocharger was the then-new EMD mechanically assisted turbo-compressor. During engine startup, and at lower power levels, during which there is not sufficient exhaust heat energy to drive the turbine fast enough for the compressor to supply the air necessary for combustion, the engine drives the compressor through a gear train and a freewheel. At higher power levels, the freewheel is disengaged, and the turbo-compressor operates as a true turbocharger. It is possible for the turbo-compressor to revert to compressor mode momentarily during commands for large increases in engine power. Turbocharging provides higher horsepower and good running characteristics at all altitudes. Turbocharging also improves fuel consumption and reduces emissions.

Previous Union Pacific experiments with turbocharging had used multiple Elliot or Garrett AiResearch turbochargers feeding the usual pair of Roots blowers. EMD's mechanically assisted turbocharger eliminated the need for the pair of Roots blowers and also integrated the turbocharging function from two (Elliot) or four (AiResearch) smaller add-on turbochargers into one much larger, turbo-compressor (turbocharger) with intercooling.

The introduction of the EMD-type turbocharger was successful and all subsequent GP series were offered with this turbocharger, although not all models within a series were offered with turbocharging (e.g., the 38 models were Roots-blown).

== Original buyers ==
Railroad	Quantity	Road numbers	Notes
Electro Motive Division (demonstrators)	4	5625–5628	to Southern Pacific 7234–7237
Atchison, Topeka and Santa Fe Railway	75	1100–1174	
Chicago, Burlington and Quincy Railroad	36	900–935	to Burlington Northern Railroad 2036–2071
Great Northern Railway	36	2000–2035	High short hood; to Burlington Northern Railroad 2000–2035, 1700 gallon fuel tanks
New York Central Railroad	15	6100–6114	no dynamic brake; to Penn Central 2100-2112; to Conrail same numbers
Southern Pacific Company	34	7200–7233	
St. Louis Southwestern Railway	20	800–819	
Union Pacific Railroad	30	700–729	
Western Pacific Railroad	10	2001–2010	High short hood; Second Order used Blomberg B trucks from traded-in FTs
Total	260		

== Preservation ==
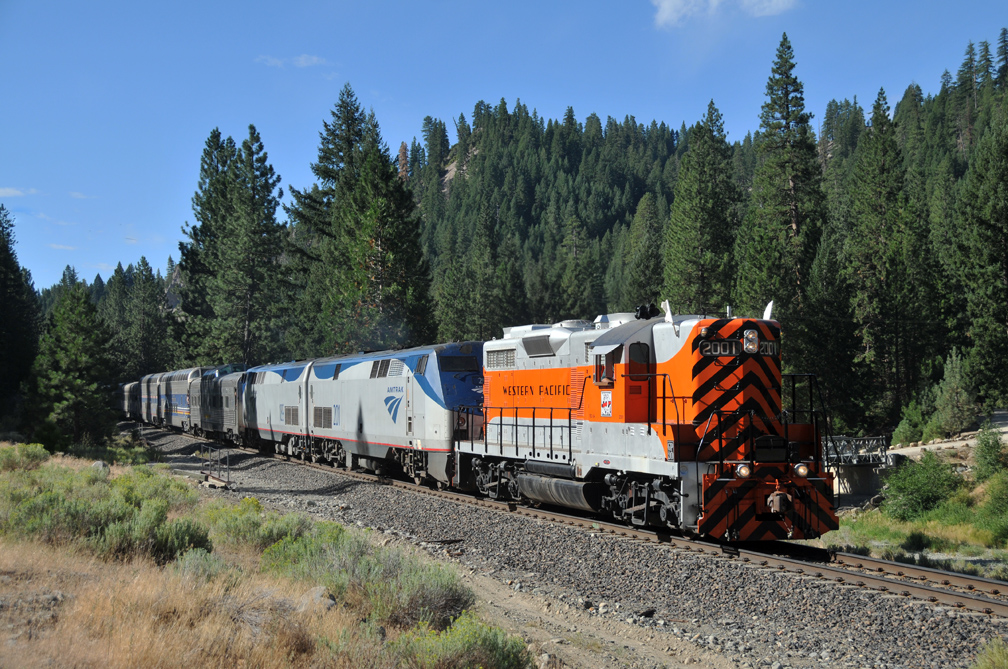
WP #2001, the first production GP20, leads a special train in 2009. Note the high nose on the short hood.

- Western Pacific 2001, the very first GP20 built, is preserved at Western Pacific Railroad Museum at Portola, CA.
- KLIX 2003, originally Cotton Belt 815, is being stored at the Arkansas Railroad Museum in Pine Bluff, AR.
- Midland Railway 4079, originally Southern Pacific 7229, is on The Midland Railway in Baldwin City, Kansas.
