= EMD SD28 =

Model of 1800 hp Co′Co′ American diesel locomotive

EMD SD28 and SDP28
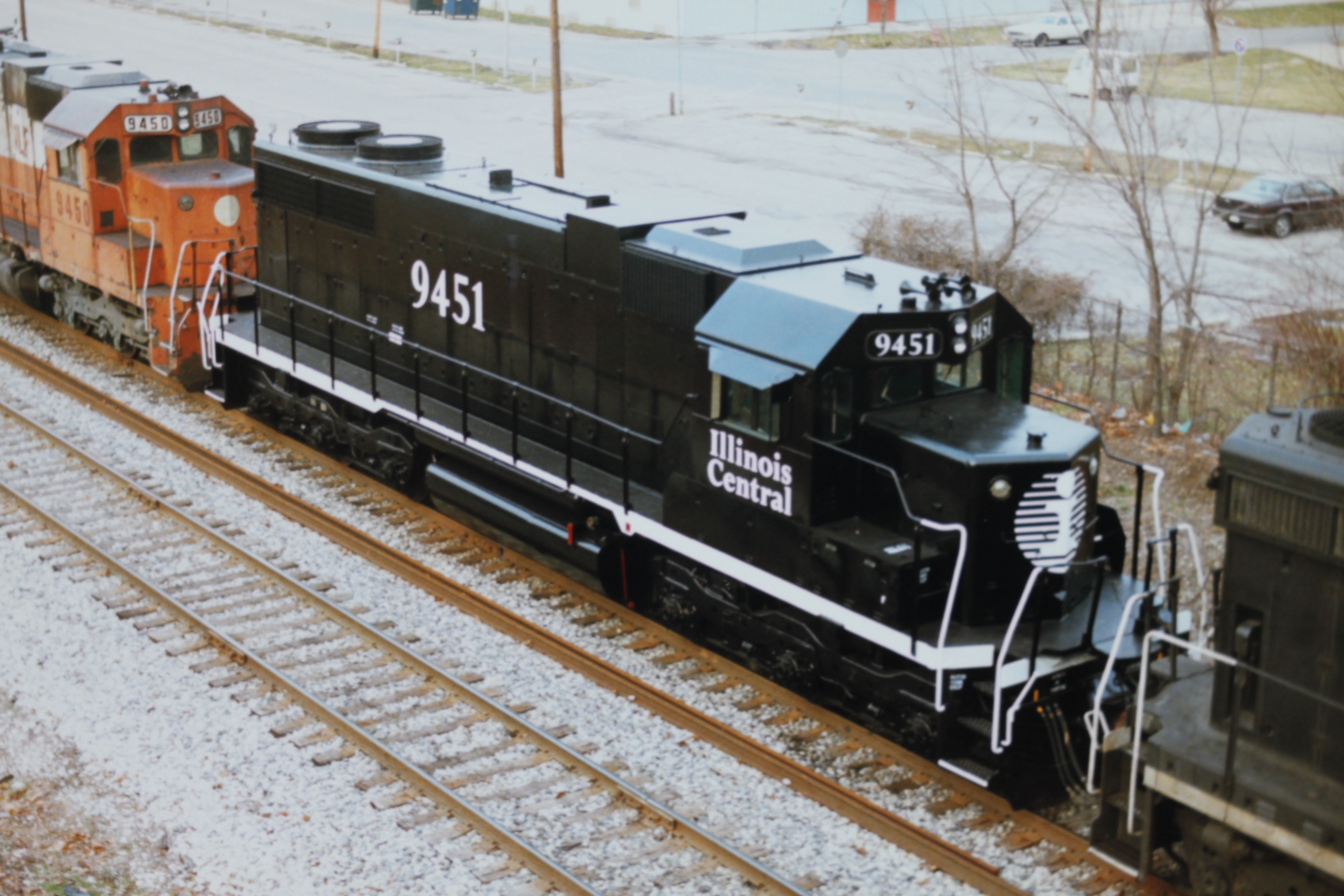
Type and origin
- Power type: Diesel-electric
- Builder: General Motors Electro-Motive Division (EMD)
- Model: SD28, SDP28
- Build date: July – September 1965, SDP28 May 1966
- Total produced: 12
Specifications
- Configuration
  - AAR: C-C
- Gauge: 4 ft 8 1/2 in (1,435 mm) standard gauge
- Prime mover: EMD 16-567D1
- Engine type: V16 diesel
- Cylinders: 16
Performance figures
- Power output: 1,800 hp (1.34 MW)

An EMD SD28 is a 6-axle diesel locomotive built by General Motors Electro-Motive Division between July 1965 and September 1965. Power was provided by an EMD 567D1 16-cylinder engine which generated 1,800 horsepower (1.34 MW). This locomotive was basically a non-turbocharged version of the EMD SD35. 6 examples of this locomotive model were built for American railroads.

A passenger variant, type SDP28, was built for export to Korea in May 1966, with 6 delivered.

== Original buyers ==
Owner	Quantity	Numbers	notes
Columbus and Greenville Railway	2	701-702	
Reserve Mining Co.	4	1233–1236	
Korean National Railways	6	6101-6106	type SDP28
Total	12		
