= AAR type A switcher truck =

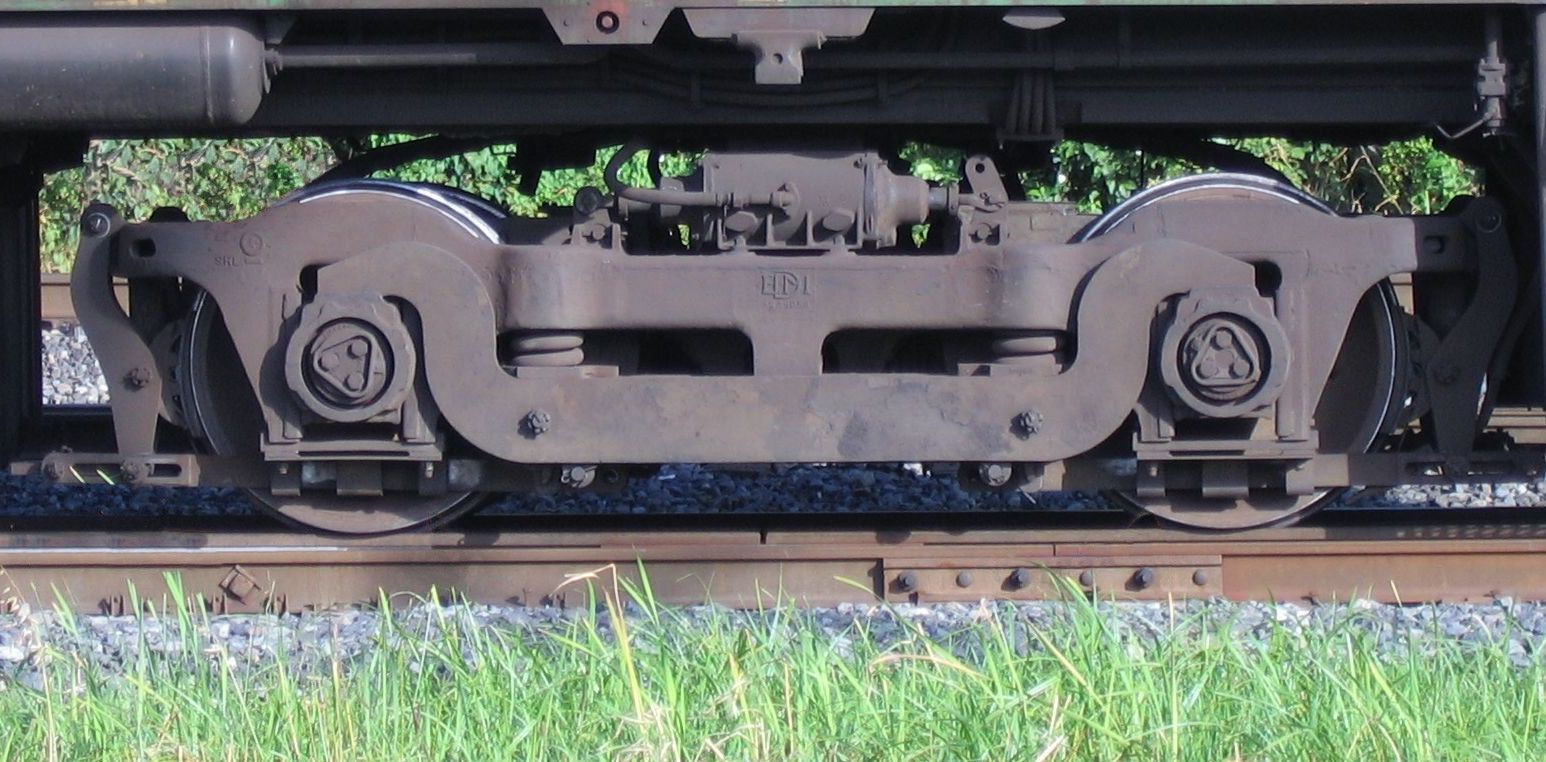
AAR type A truck

AAR Type A trucks were first introduced with EMD locomotives sold in 1935; they were a success, became standard on EMD switcher locomotives into the 1970s, and were also used on various other makers' locomotives. Their initial design was a collaboration between Martin P Blomberg at EMD and the originating foundry General Steel Industries. Intended for industrial plant and rail yard shunting duty, this truck has a basic suspension system with drop equalizers, secondary leaf springs and primary coil springs, which provide adequate damping and relatively simplified maintenance. It does not have swing hangers as may be seen in higher-speed designs such as the Blomberg B.

== See also ==
- Blomberg B
- Bogie
