= Woodward, Inc. =

American aerospace and industrial products company

Coordinates: 40°33′13.45″N 105°3′39.82″W

- Formerly: The Woodward Governor Company
- Type: Public
- Traded as: Nasdaq: WWD (WGOV prior to 2011); S&P 400 Component
- ISIN: US9807451037
- Industry: Aerospace, Industrial
- Founded: Rockford, Illinois, United States (1870)
- Founder: Amos Woodward
- Headquarters: Fort Collins, Colorado, United States
- Number of locations: 42 plants and offices in 13 countries (2021)
- Area served: Worldwide
- Key people: Chip Blankenship; (Chairman, President, & CEO); Bill Lacey; (Vice Chairman & CFO) Tom Cromwell; (Vice Chairman & COO) Paxton McVoy; (Executive vice president & CIO)
- Products: Control systems and components
- Revenue: ▼US$ 2.25 billion; (FY SEP 2021)
- Operating income: ▼US$ 280.08 million; (FY SEP 2021)
- Net income: ▼US$ 208.65 million; (FY SEP 2021)
- Total assets: ▲US$ 4.09 billion; (FY SEP 2021)
- Total equity: ▲US$ 2.21 billion; (FY SEP 2021)
- Number of employees: ~7,200 (FY MAY 2021)
- Website: www.woodward.com

Woodward, Inc. is a Fort Collins, Colorado-based designer, manufacturer, and service provider of control systems and control system components (e.g., pumps, controls, motors, actuators, air valves, position sensors, fuel nozzles, and electronics) for aircraft, aircraft engines, industrial engines and turbines, power generation and mobile industrial equipment. The company also provides military devices and other defense equipment.

The company was founded in 1870 in Rockford, Illinois, as The Woodward Governor Company by Amos Woodward in 1870. Initially, the company made speed controls for waterwheels (first patent No. 103,813) and eventually moved into mechanical controls for hydro turbines. In the 1920s and 1930s, Woodward began designing controls for diesel and other reciprocating engines and for industrial turbines. Also in the 1930s, Woodward developed a governor for variable-pitch aircraft propellers. Woodward parts were notably used in the GE engine on the United States military's first turbine-powered aircraft. Starting in the 1950s, Woodward began designing electronic controls, first analog and then digital units.

== History ==
=== Founding years ===
The company was founded in Rockford, Illinois, in 1870, when Amos W. Woodward invented a non-compensating mechanical waterwheel governor (U.S. patent No. 103,813). Thirty years later, his son Elmer patented the first successful mechanical compensating governor for hydraulic turbines (U.S. patent No. 583,527). In 1933, the company expanded its product line to include diesel engine controls (U.S. patent No. 2,039,507) and aircraft propeller governors (British patent No. 470,284).

Elmer E. Woodward conceived, designed, and developed the first successful propeller control in 1933. This model PW-34 propeller governor is on display at the Udvar-Hazy annex of the Smithsonian National Air and Space Museum.

=== 2007-2017 ===
As of 2007, Woodward Governor Company became a billion-dollar company with establishments worldwide, including Japan, China, and Europe.

In January 2011, the company announced its name change to Woodward, Inc.

A growing number of general aviation and commuter aircraft rely on Woodward designed propeller and overspeed governors for turboshaft and turboprop engines. As of September 2016, approximately 34% of the company's sales were to the defense market, including parts for the V-22 Osprey ($645,000 revenue per aircraft) and the F/A-18 ($335,000 revenue per aircraft). Some of the engines controlled by Woodward include those from Honeywell (TPE331), General Electric (CT7/T700), and Pratt & Whitney Canada (PT6A series).

=== 2018-present ===
In April 2018, Woodward Inc. purchased L'Orange GmbH for $859 million. This supplier of fuel-injection components for stationary, marine, offshore, and industrial engines was part of Rolls-Royce's power-systems business in Germany, the US and China. On January 12, 2020, the company announced an intent to merge with Hexcel, according to the Wall Street Journal. On April 20, it was announced the merger was called off, as a result of the health crisis caused by the COVID-19 pandemic. COVID-19 also led to a sharp drop in revenue for Woodward, Inc.

In February 2024, a protest outside facilities in Niles, Illinois resulted in arrests of 7 men and 26 women. Protesters said that Woodward is complicit in the Gaza war and called for an end to contracts with Boeing and Israel. A previous protest in support of the Palestinian cause brought about 300 people to the facility in Fort Collins, Colorado, in November 2023.

== Woodward family patents ==
- US patent 103813, Woodward, Amos W., "Improvement in Water-Governors", issued 1870-05-31
- US patent 432105, Woodward, Amos W. & Woodward, Elmer E., "Water-Wheel Governor", issued 1890-07-15
- US patent 438876, Woodward, Elmer E., "Lathe Center Grinder", issued 1890-10-21
- US patent 466817, Woodward, Elmer E., "Orange Sizer", issued 1892-01-12
- US patent 497903, Woodward, Elmer E., "Adjustable Nozzle", issued 1893-05-23, assigned to James Leffel & Company
- US patent 583527, Woodward, Amos W. & Woodward, Elmer E., "Governor for Water Wheels", issued 1897-06-01
- US patent 608245, Woodward, Elmer E., "Governor for Water-Wheels", issued 1898-08-02
- US patent 679353, Woodward, Elmer E., "Governor for Water-Wheels", issued 1901-07-30
- US patent 811349, Woodward, Amos W., "Stove or Furnace", issued 1906-01-30
- US patent 979239, Albertson, Robert; Woodward, Frank M. & Woodward, Amos W., "Exhibitor", issued 1910-12-20
- US patent 1106434, Woodward, Elmer E., "Speed-Regulator", issued 1914-08-11
- US patent 2039507, Woodward, Elmer E., "Diesel Engine Governor", issued 1936-05-05, assigned to Woodward Governor Company
- GB patent 470284, Woodward, Elmer E., "Automatic Governor Control for Controllable Pitch Propeller", issued 1937-08-12, assigned to Woodward Governor Company
- US patent 2204640, Woodward, Elmer E., "Governor Mechanism", issued 1940-06-18, assigned to Woodward Governor Company
- US patent 2273408, Woodward, Elmer E. & Woodward, Walter T., "Speed Regulating System", issued 1942-02-17, assigned to Woodward Governor Company
