= Martin P. Blomberg =

Martin Petrus Frederik Blomberg (December 11, 1888, in Östervåla, Sweden — March 29, 1966, in Winter Park, Florida) was an American engineer of Swedish origin. He became well known for the development of the truck frame for the diesel-electric locomotives of the Electro Motive Division (EMD).

== Early life ==
Blomberg grew up as a son of a teacher and minister. He graduated from the technical institute in Örebro, and in 1910 went to the university at Uppsala. In this time, he was very active and trained for the Olympic Games of 1912 in Sweden. However, he immigrated to Canada in the same year. From 1912 to 1914, he worked in Trois-Rivières, Quebec in a paper mill, and studied technical drawing and mechanical construction in an evening school. From 1915, he worked then National Steel Car Ltd Hamilton, Ontario. He later traveled for a year by canoeing 900 miles from the Albany River to the Hudson Bay.

In 1916, he went to the US and enlisted with the US Army during World War I. After he returned, he married Laura Van Buskirk. His son Richard Nelson Blomberg was born on October 21, 1924.

== Pullman-Standard ==
From 1925 to 1935, Blomberg worked for the Pullman Company, where he was responsible for the construction of railroad truck frames and passenger car bodies. Among his designs he assisted at Pullman were the Union Pacific M-10000 in 1934 (U.S. patent D100,000), and the Brooklyn Rapid Transit "Green Hornet", lightweight MS Multi-section car (New York City Subway car) for use on the BRT elevated transit lines in Brooklyn, New York.

== Electro-Motive ==
On September 1, 1935, he accepted a position in the Electro-Motive Corporation (from 1941, it was renamed to Electro-Motive Division of General Motors). There Blomberg was given responsibility for the construction of locomotive bodies, frames and truck frames. The EMC E4 diesel-electric locomotive was mostly his design, including the three-axle (A1A) truck. In 1939 he designed the four-wheel flexible truck frame from the three-axle version for the new diesel-electric freight locomotive called the EMD FT. This four-wheel truck frame and its derivations were incorporated in more than 15,000 locomotives. Unofficially, but generally accepted, the two-axle trucks, Blomberg B and Blomberg M, are named after him. The two-axle AAR Type A switcher truck is also a Blomberg design.

Blomberg registered over 100 patents with the US Patent and Trademark Office during his 32 years with EMD. In 1947, he became lead engineer after the chief engineer of EMD.

== Retirement ==
On 1 June 1949, he retired. He died on March 29, 1966, at the age of 77 in Winter Park, Florida.
