= EMD SD35 =

American model of diesel locomotive

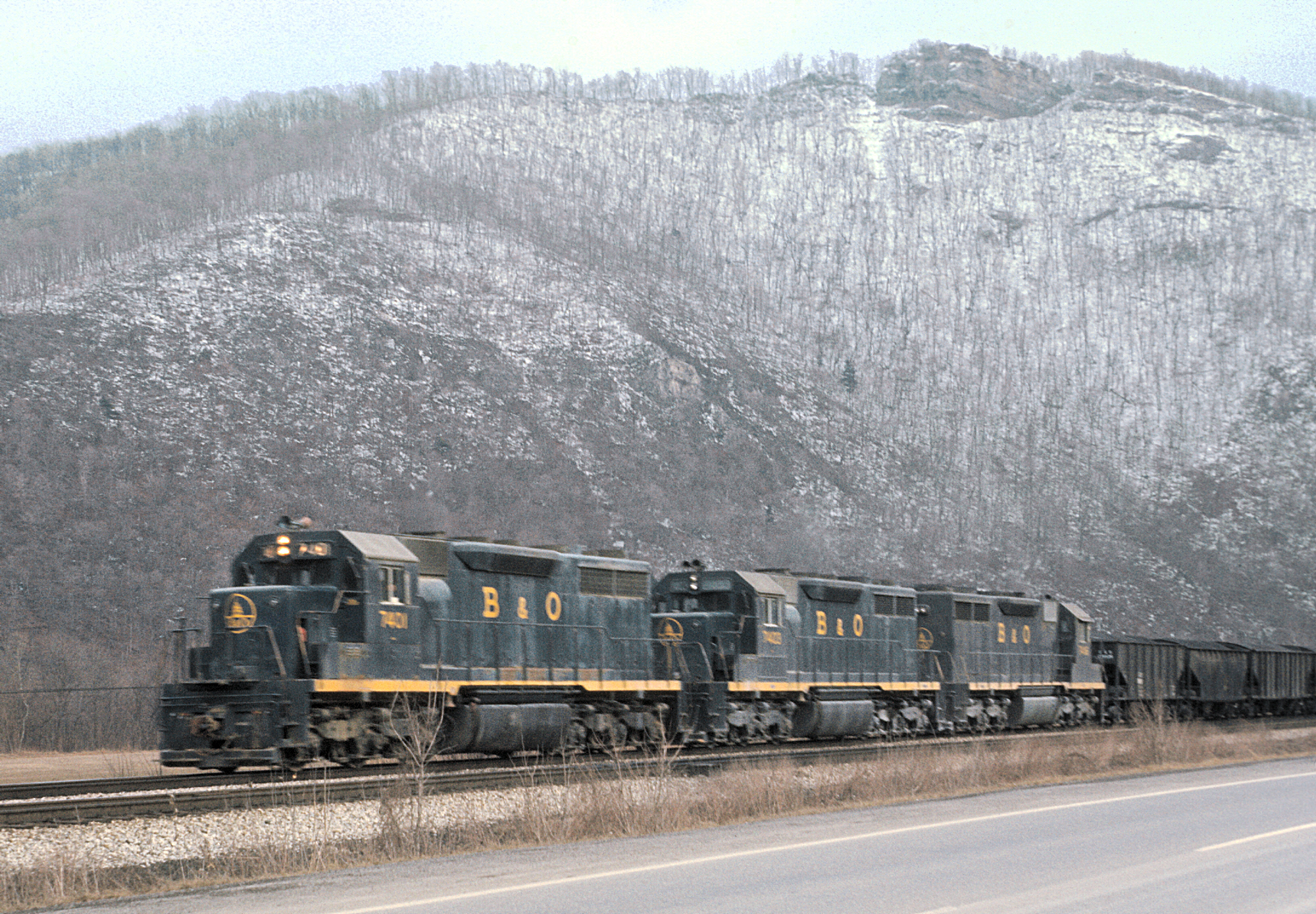
- B&O #7401 leads a coal train through Keyser, West Virginia in 1969.
Type and origin
- Power type: Diesel-electric
- Builder: General Motors Electro-Motive Division (EMD)
- Model: SD35
- Build date: June 1964 – January 1966
- Total produced: 360
Specifications
- Configuration
  - AAR: C-C
- Gauge: 4 ft 8 1/2 in (1,435 mm) standard gauge
- Length: 60 ft 8 1/2 in (18.504 m)
- Fuel capacity: 3,000 US gal (11,000 L; 2,500 imp gal)
- Prime mover: EMD 16-567D3A
- Engine type: V16 diesel
- Cylinders: 16
Performance figures
- Power output: 2,500 hp (1.9 MW)
Career
- Locale: United States

The EMD SD35 is a model of 6-axle diesel-electric locomotive built by General Motors Electro-Motive Division between June 1964 and January 1966. Power was provided by an EMD 567D3A, 16-cylinder engine which generated 2,500 brake horsepower (1,900 kW). A 3,000-US-gallon (11,000 L; 2,500 imp gal) fuel tank was used on this unit. This locomotive model shared a common frame with the EMD SD28, giving it an overall length of 60 feet 8 1/2 inches (18.504 m). 360 examples of this locomotive model were built for American railroads.

== Original owners ==
Railroad	Quantity	Numbers	Notes
Atlantic Coast Line Railroad	23	1001–1023	
Baltimore and Ohio Railroad	24	7400-7419, 7437-7440	
Central of Georgia Railway	10	215-224	High Hood
Central Railroad of New Jersey	12	2501–2512	to Conrail, renumbered 6040-6051
Chesapeake and Ohio Railway	14	7420-7431, 7425(2nd), 7428(2nd)	
General Motors Electro-Motive Division	1	7715	to Atlantic Coast Line 1000
Louisville and Nashville Railroad	22	1200–1221	
Norfolk and Western Railway	80	1500–1579	High Hood
Pennsylvania Railroad	40	6000-6039	to Penn Central then Conrail 6000-6039
Southern Railway	100	3000-3099	High Hood
Southern Pacific Railroad	29	4816-4844	
Western Maryland Railway	5	7432-7436	
Totals	360		

== Preservation ==
- Baltimore & Ohio #7402 is preserved at the National Museum of Railroad History & Innovation in Baltimore, Maryland.
- VLIX #1216 (built 1965 as L&N #1216) is preserved at the Southern Appalachia Railway Museum in Oak Ridge, Tennessee, awaiting restoration.
- Western Maryland #7436 (built 1964) is preserved and operable, currently leased to various shortline railroads. It was rebuilt by the Burlington Northern Railroad into an SD38P and is owned by Precision Locomotive Leasing.
