= EMD SD18 =

Model of 1800 hp Co′Co′ American diesel locomotives

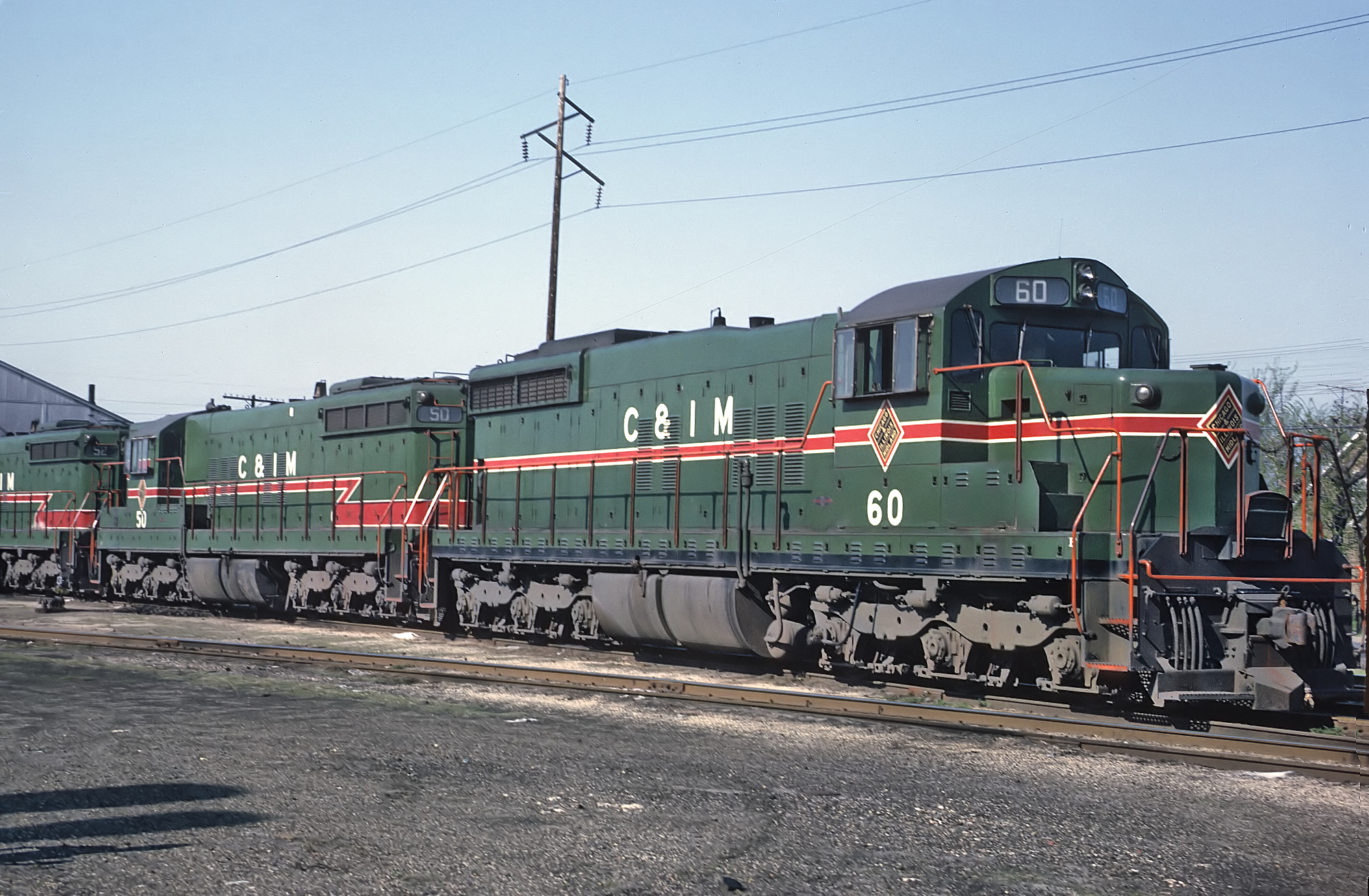
- Chicago and Illinois Midland Railway 60 coupled to two SD9 locomotives at Springfield, Illinois, May 7, 1966
Type and origin
- Power type: Diesel-electric
- Builder: General Motors Electro-Motive Division (EMD)
- Model: SD18
- Build date: April 1960 – March 1963
- Total produced: 114
Specifications
- Configuration
  - AAR: C-C
- Gauge: 4 ft 8 1/2 in (1,435 mm) standard gauge 5 ft 3 in (1,600 mm), Brazil
- Prime mover: EMD 567
- Engine type: V16 diesel
- Cylinders: 16
Performance figures
- Power output: 1,800 hp (1.3 MW)
Career
- Disposition: 3 preserved

The EMD SD18 is a 6-axle diesel locomotive built by General Motors Electro-Motive Division between April 1960 and March 1963. Power was provided by an EMD 567D1 16-cylinder engine which generated 1,800 hp (1.3 MW).

54 examples of this locomotive model were built for American railroads.

== Design and production ==
The SD18 was the third model in EMD's SD (special duty) line of locomotives. It was designed as a modified GP18 which had six axles instead of four. The additional axles allowed for more tractive effort and a more even distribution of weight compared to the GP18.

== Original owners ==
| Photograph | Owner | Quantity | Numbers |
|---|---|---|---|
| | Bessemer and Lake Erie Railroad | 7 | 851–857 |
| | Chesapeake and Ohio Railway | 19 | 1800–1818 |
| | Chicago and Illinois Midland Railway | 2 | 60–61 |
| | Duluth, Missabe and Iron Range Railway | 19 | 175–193 |
| | Reserve Mining Co. | 7 | 1226–1232 |
| | RFFSA (export to Brazil) | 45 | 3401–3445 |
| | Korea National Railroad | 15 | 6001–6015 |
| | Totals | 114 | |

== Preservation ==
Chop-nosed Duluth, Missabe & Iron Range 193 is now an operating member of the Lake Superior Railroad Museum collection. They also previously had DM&IR 316 in their collection, which is an "SDM"; an EMD SD18 given EMD 645 power assemblies by the Missabe, though still labeled as an SD18.

As of March 2022, grain terminal operator AgRail LLC of Bloomington, Illinois has acquired Western Rail Inc. SD18M No. 1229 through a lease-to-purchase agreement. The unit began service with Minnesota's Reserve Mining in May 1961 and was last used by the Western Milling plant in Goshen, CA. It was rewired in the 1980s.
