= Blomberg B =

2-axle bogie

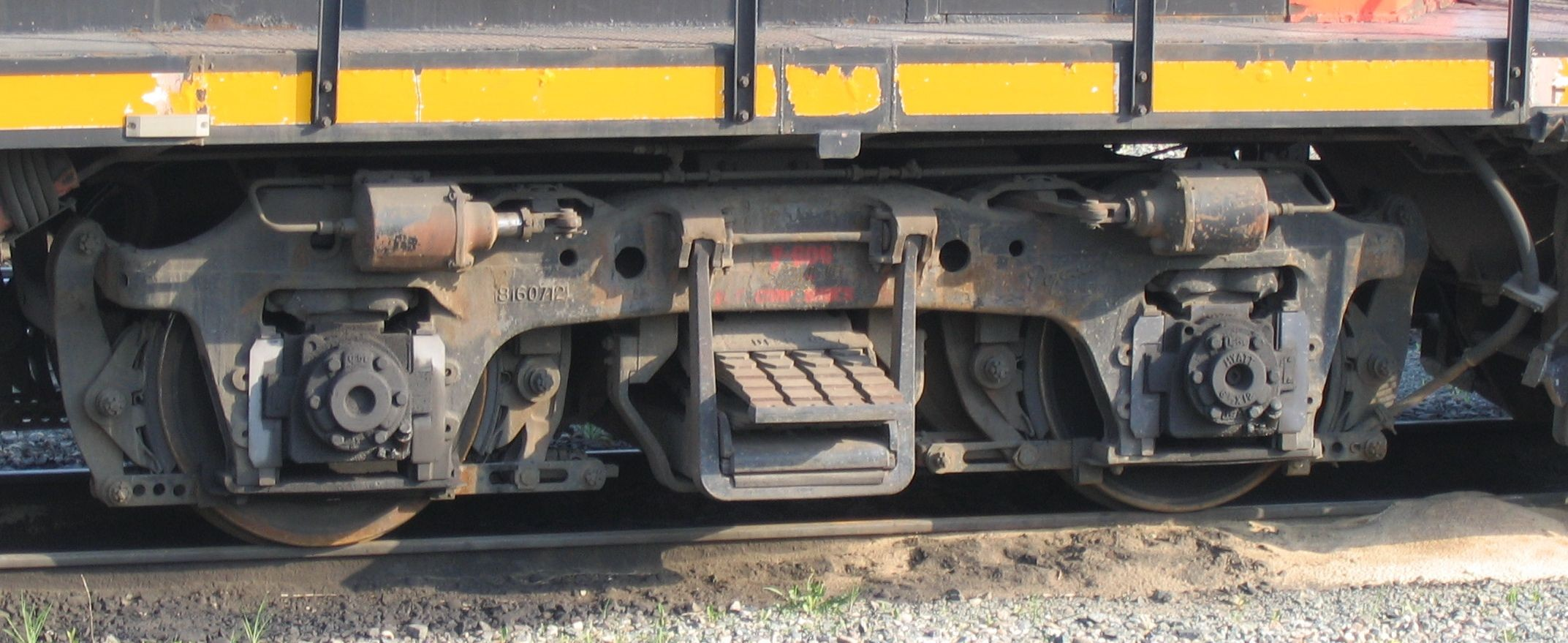
EMD Blomberg B trucks

The Blomberg B is a 2-axle bogie that was introduced by EMD in 1939 with the FT locomotive series; the original "B" version plus later "M" and "X" versions were quite successful and became standard equipment on a multitude of locomotive models. They are easily identified by prominent "swing hangers" on each side which widen the effective spring base and provide a better ride.

EMD literature refers to this truck as the "2 Axle Outside Swing Hanger;" informally it is named after EMD designer Martin Blomberg; this design evolved as an abbreviation of the preceding 3-axle design from the E-units; see U.S. patent 2,189,125 filed on Jan 29, 1938 and granted on Feb 6, 1940.

As of 2022 Blomberg B trucks are common sights under operating locomotives throughout North America.

== B version ==
The "B" version is the original 1939 design. EMD Blomberg B trucks are seen on other makers' locomotives; this occasionally resulted when buyers of new GE locomotives preferred trade-in EMD trucks and/or motors, instead of GE standard equipment.

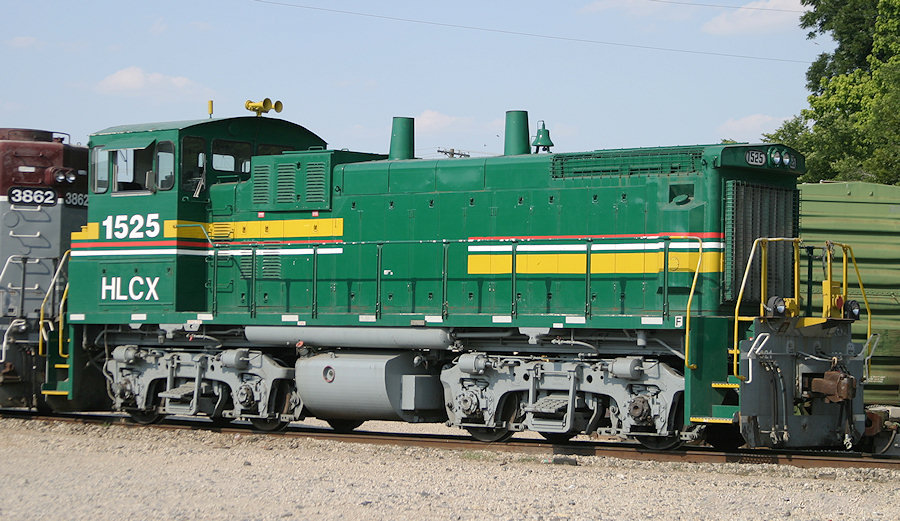
EMD Blomberg B trucks on an EMD SW1500

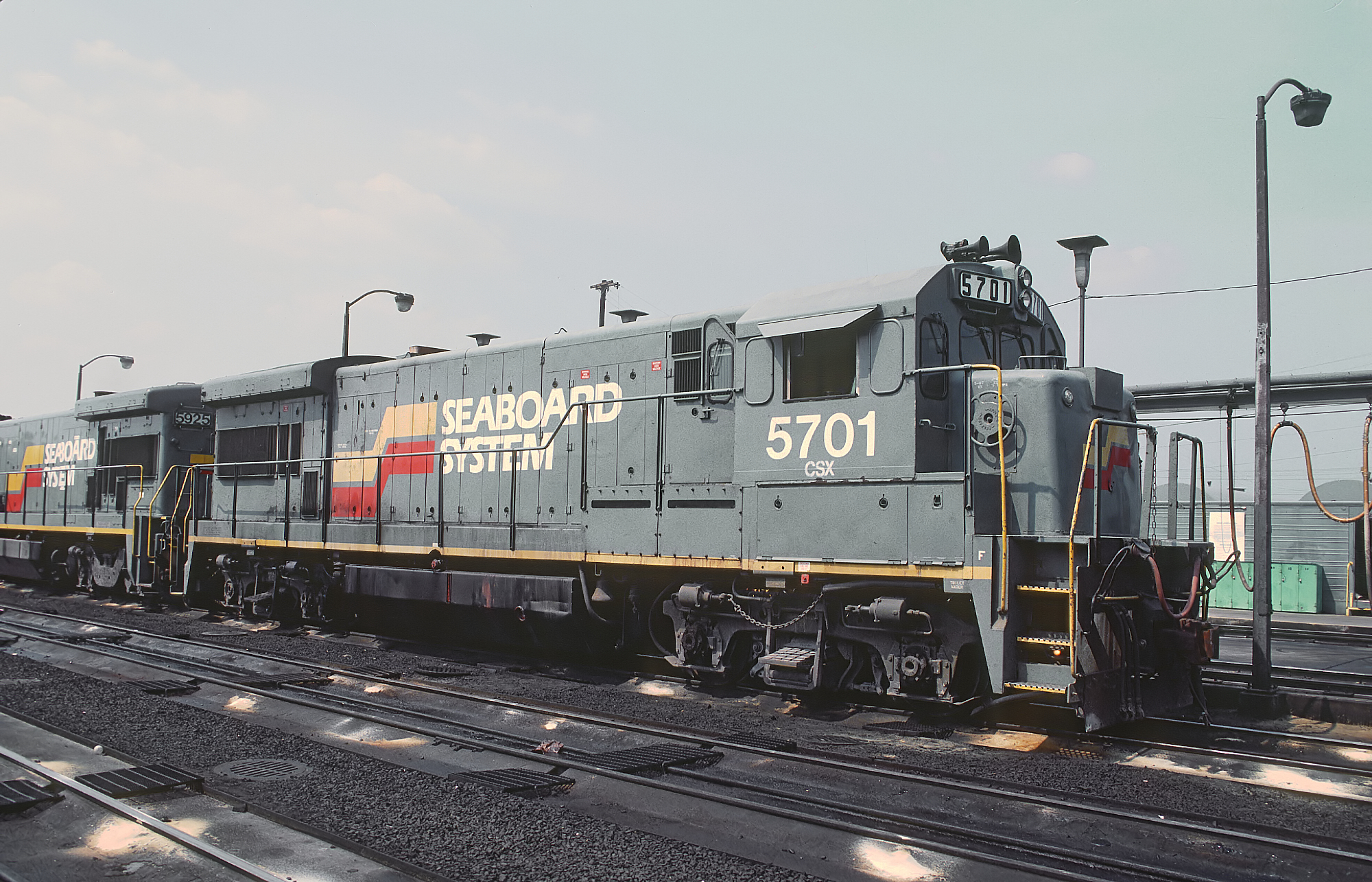
EMD Blomberg B trucks on a GE U36B

== M version ==
The M version (meaning "modified") was introduced in 1972 with the EMD Dash 2 locomotive series; it is also used on later models such as the GP50, GP60, F40PH and F59PH, as well as the MPI MPXpress. They can be easily distinguished by the shock absorber mounted on the end of one axle per side.

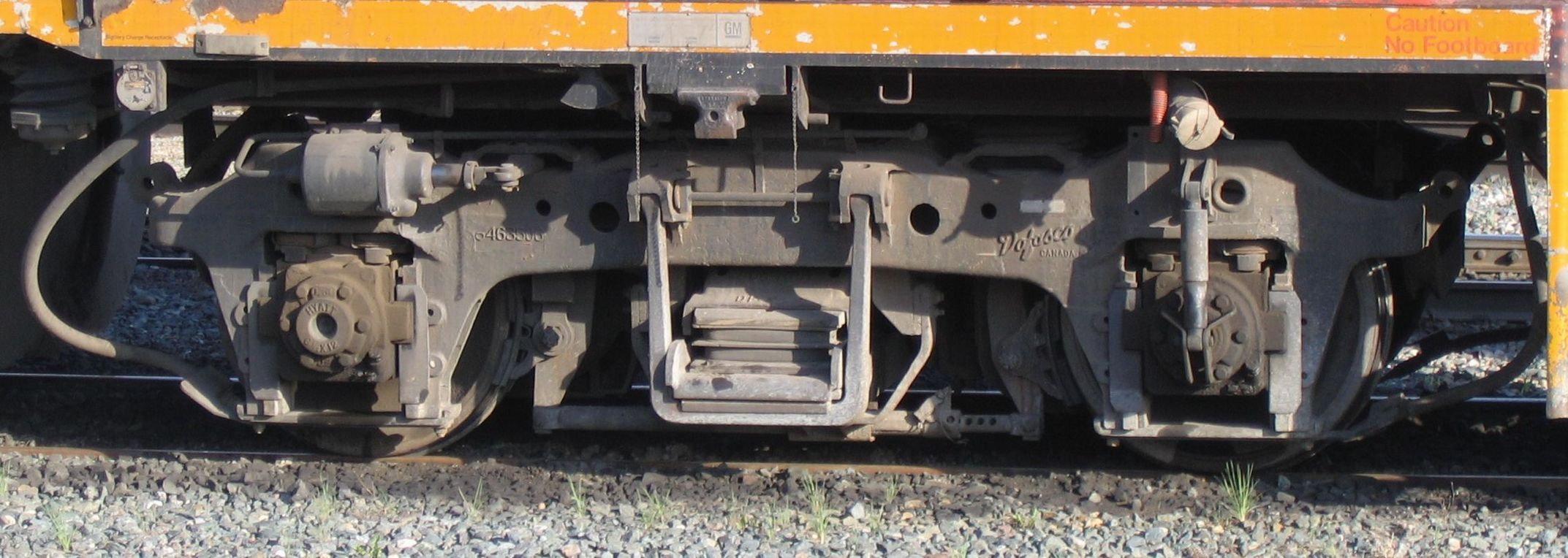
Closeup of EMD Blomberg M trucks

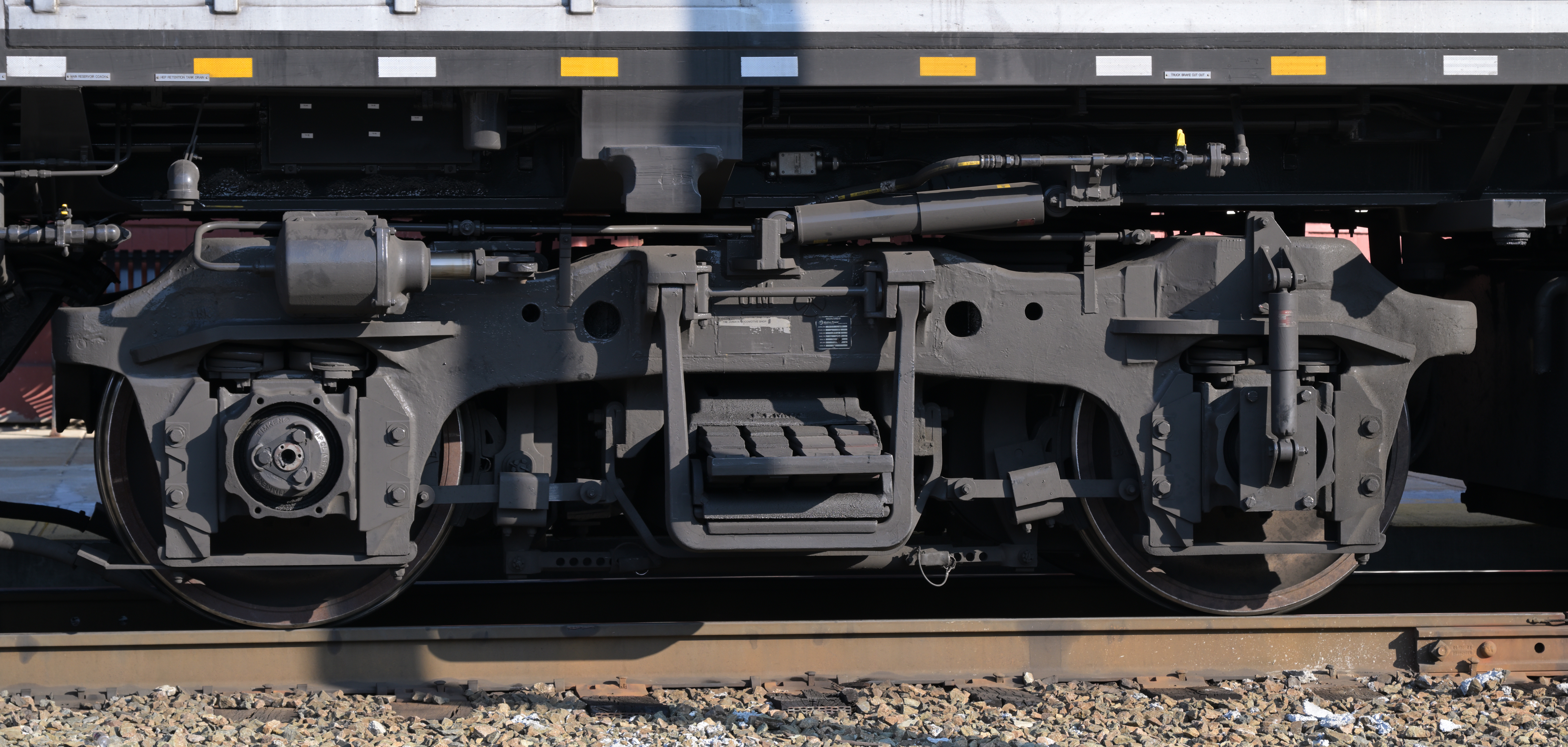
Closeup of a EMD Blomberg M truck on an MPI F40PH-3C

== X version ==
The X version (from "express") was introduced in 2007 with the MPI MPXpress locomotive series; its formal model is MPI 2237. This version directly evolved from the Blomberg M, but is longer and thus not rebuilt from older Blomberg frames.

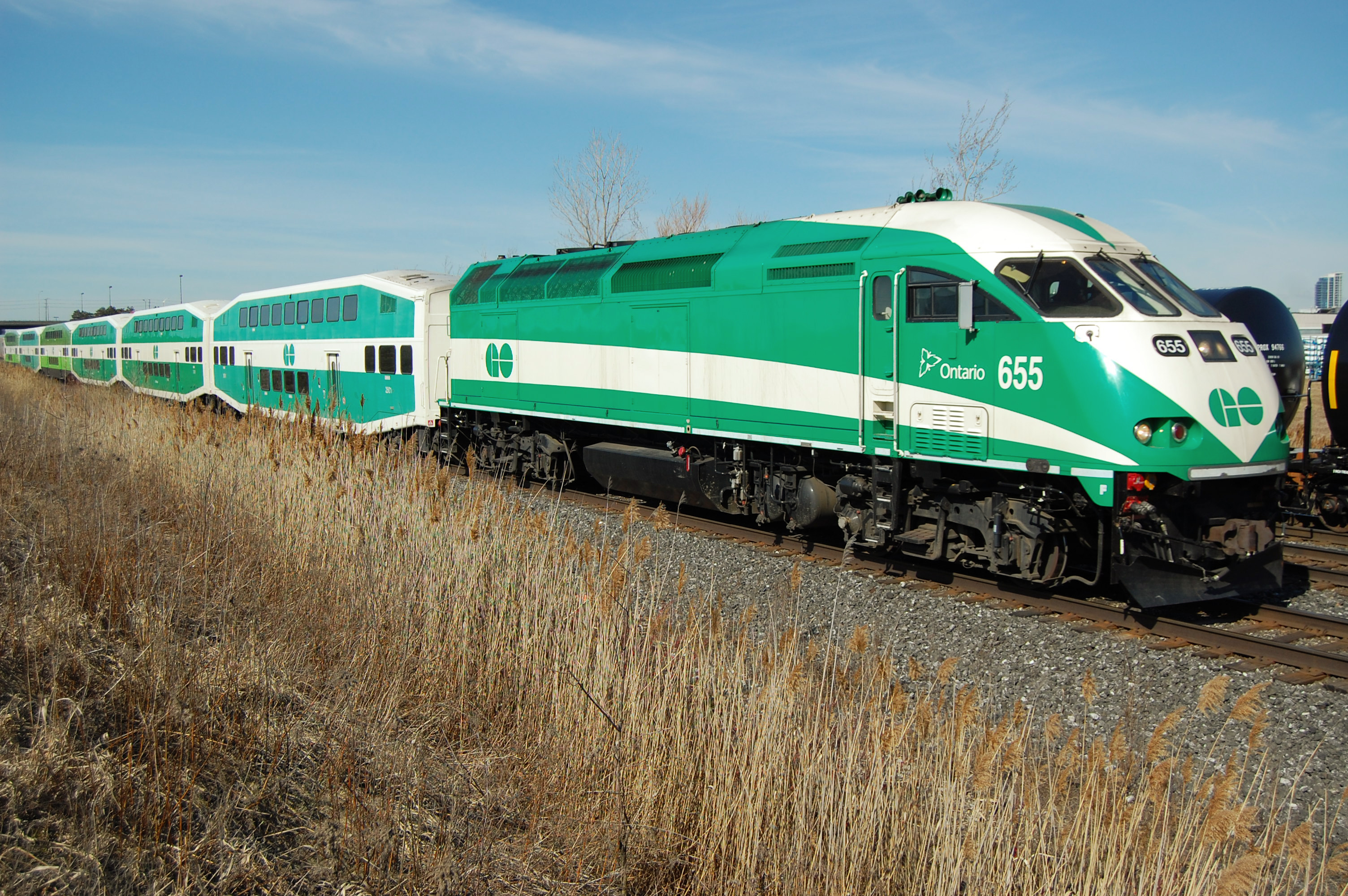
MPI Blomberg X trucks on an MP40

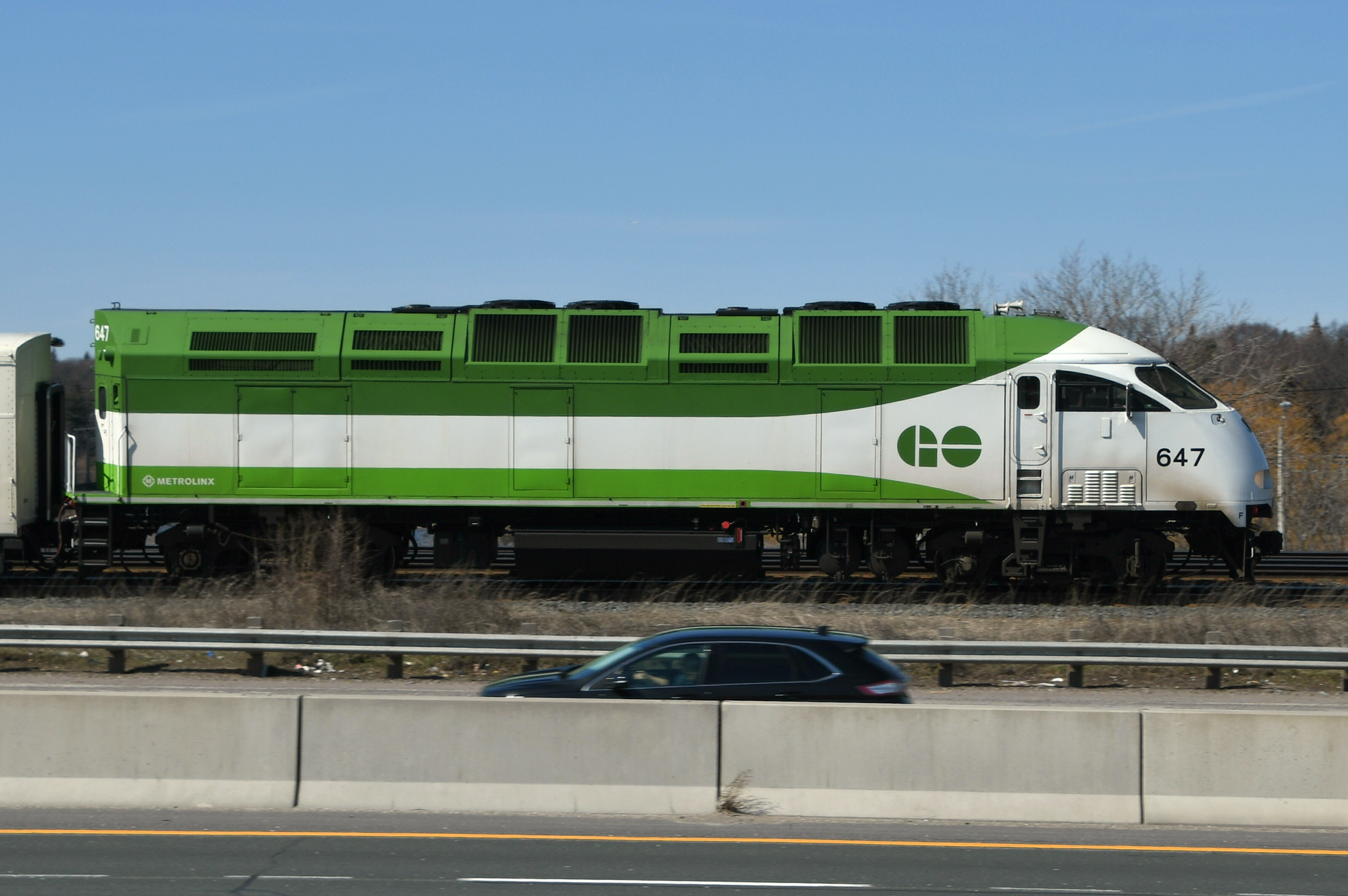
MPI Blomberg X trucks on an MP54

== See also ==
- Bogie
- Flexicoil suspension
