= D16 =

D16 may refer to:

== Vehicles ==
=== Aircraft ===
- Fokker D.XVI, a Dutch fighter aircraft
- Temco D-16, an American twin-engine civil utility aircraft

=== Locomotives ===
- BHP Port Kembla D16 class, an Australian diesel locomotive
- British Rail Class D16/1, two experimental diesel locomotives of 1947/8
- British Rail Class D16/2, three experimental diesel locomotives of 1950–54
- GSR Class D16, an Irish 4-4-0 steam locomotive class
- LNER Class D16, an English 4-4-0 steam locomotive class
- Pennsylvania Railroad class D16, an American 4-4-0 steam locomotive

=== Ships ===
- Brazilian destroyer escort Bertioga (D16), a Cannon-class destroyer escort of the Brazilian Navy
- Greek destroyer Velos (D16), a Fletcher-class destroyer of the Hellenic Navy
- HMAS Norman (D16), a N-class destroyer of the Royal Australian Navy
- HMS Ivanhoe (D16), an I-class destroyer of the Royal Navy
- HMS London (D16), a County-class destroyer of the Royal Navy

== Other uses ==
- Chondroma
- Megatron, a character from the Transformers franchise who once was D-16.
- Dhuruvangal Pathinaaru, a 2016 Indian film
- Digital Bolex D16, a cinema camera
- Dublin 16, a postal district in Ireland
- Iceberg D-16, an Antarctic iceberg discovered in 2006
- D16 series of Honda D engines
