= Port Manatee Railroad =

Shortline railroad in Florida

- Port Manatee Terminal Railroad; Manatee County Port Authority Railroad

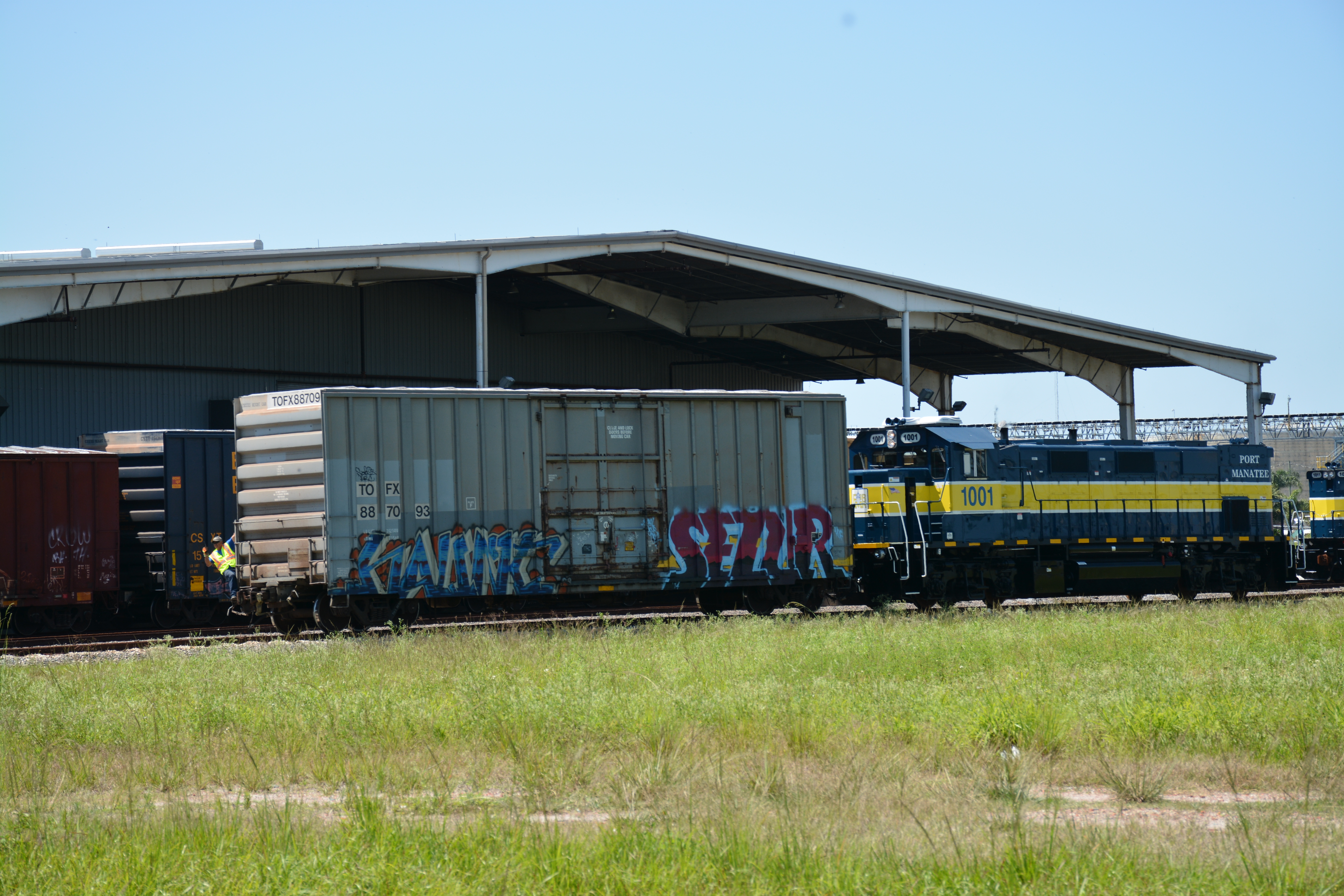
- NRE 2GS14B locomotive 1001 performing shunting duties on the Port Manatee Railroad, May 2014

Overview
- Fleet: 2 NRE 2GS14B locomotives (since 2014)
- Reporting mark: PMR; MAUP; MCPA
- Locale: Palmetto, Florida
- Dates of operation: January 3, 1972–present

Technical
- Track gauge: 1,435 mm (4 ft 8 1/2 in)
- Track length: 7 mi (11 km)

The Port Manatee Railroad (reporting mark PMR), formerly known as the Port Manatee Terminal Railroad (reporting mark MAUP) and the Manatee County Port Authority Railroad (reporting mark MCPA), is a 7-mile (11 km) shortline railroad, which connects Port Manatee with the CSX Transportation mainline (originally owned by the Seaboard Coast Line Railroad) in Palmetto, Florida, United States. The railroad initially began service in 1970, and officially began its services on January 3, 1972. The railroad was operated by the Manatee County Port Authority until 2021, when Regional Rail took over operations of the railroad.

== Operations ==
The 7-mile (11 km) railroad connects Port Manatee with the CSX Transportation mainline in Palmetto, Florida. The CSX interchange track is east of Port Manatee. The CSX Interchange Yard consists of four tracks which run parallel to the CSX mainline. The track continues west of the CSX mainline, and runs parallel with North Dock Street to the terminals at Berths 6 and 7 of Port Manatee.

The PMR has only three employees: a yard master, an assistant yard master, and an engineer. The railroad has two hopper car dumpers, which can unload ten sixty-short-ton (54 t) hopper cars an hour; two loading chutes, which can load ten hopper cars an hour; and a boxcar loader which can load six boxcars per hour. In addition, the PMR has nine railroad crossings, nineteen railroad switches, and a capacity for three hundred freight cars.

== History ==
The Atlantic Coast Line Railroad (ACL) and Seaboard Coast Line Railroad (SCL) proposed a forty-four-mile (71 km) railroad line in August 1965, where the western terminus would be at Port Manatee, which was yet to be constructed. In a report dated September 9, 1966, the ACL and SCL planned to send phosphorite and superphosphate trains of about 150 freight cars directly to Port Manatee; switching and classification was to only occur at Port Manatee.

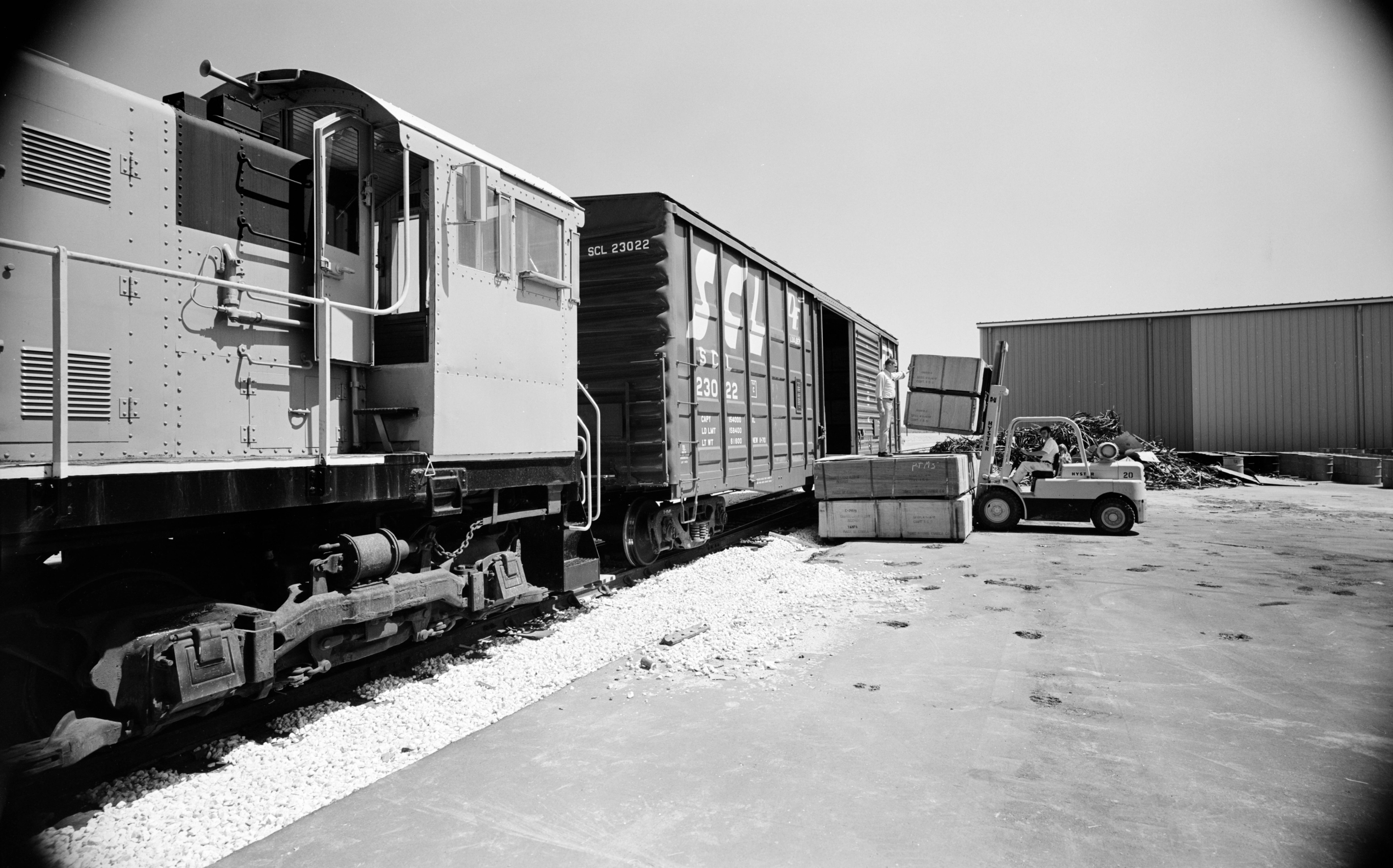
MCPA 1004 and a boxcar from the Seaboard Coast Line Railroad being unloaded at Port Manatee, c. 1971

The PMR was given permission to operate by the Interstate Commerce Commission on October 21, 1969. The railroad began service in 1970, operated by the Manatee County Port Authority (MCPA). Joel Wilcox, the port director of the MCPA, received a letter from the Seaboard Coast Line Railroad (reporting mark SCL), dated May 22, 1970, proposing to construct an interchange track between the Tampa Southern Railroad and the MCPA. Wilcox recommended approval and requested the railroad to immediately begin construction of the turnout. In June 1970, Wilcox stated that the SCL was proceeding with the construction of the interchange track. A one-mile extension was made to the railroad in 1971.

The Railroad Retirement Board determined that the MCPA was a rail carrier under the Railroad Retirement Act and the Railroad Unemployment Insurance Act, with an effective date of January 1, 1972; the railroad officially began its operations on January 3. The railroad's track mileage with the SCL fluctuated throughout the 1970s and 1980s; the MCPA owned and operated four miles (6.4 km) of track from 1972 to 1979, six miles (9.7 km) in 1982, and two miles (3.2 km) in 1984. On October 1, 1989, the name of the railroad was changed from the Manatee County Port Authority Railroad to the Port Manatee Railroad. In the 1990s, the railroad continued operating six miles (9.7 km) of track, connecting to CSX. The railroad had operated as a Class II railroad throughout the 1970s and 1980s, and has operated as a Class III railroad since the 1990s.

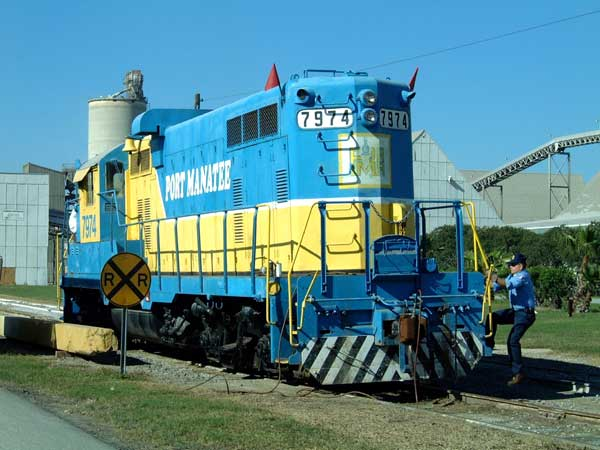
MAUP 7974 in its Port Manatee livery, c. 2004

The railroad has been used to transport lumber, linerboard, fertilizer, and phosphorite. During the 2012–2013 North American drought, the PMR had transported imports of corn to feed livestock in the Midwest. In 2014, the Barnum & Bailey "Red Unit" circus train, consisting of sixty-one cars, was stored on the Port Manatee Railroad from November to Christmas Eve. Barnum & Bailey signed a lease with the Manatee County Port Authority to keep the train at Port Manatee for ten years; the lease automatically renewed until 2024.

In 2020, the United States Department of Transportation launched a project for the PMR in two phases to replace and upgrade track with heavier rails. On December 1, 2021, Regional Rail took over operations of the railroad. Port Manatee reached an agreement with Regional Rail to operate the railroad until 2036, with an extension up to 2051. Since then, the PMR is one of several railroads operated by Regional Rail. In 2024, the PMR would temporarily move its freight cars from the berths "to higher ground" in preparation for Hurricane Milton.

== Locomotives ==
The PMR had owned several locomotives. ALCO S-2 locomoitve No. 1004 began service in 1970, and remained on the railroad until it was sold in June 1994. ALCO S-4 locomotive No. 230 was sold from the SCL to the PMR, and had begun service in August 1976. EMD GP8 locomotives 7972 and 7974 were converted from EMD GP7 locomotives in August and July 1969 respectively. EMD GP9R locomotive 7063 was sold to the PMR in 2007, and was sold again in August 2011. It is unclear which locomotives were in service; throughout the 1980s and 1990s, the railroad had been described as having two switcher locomotives. In 2012, the PMR would receive a federal grant of US$2,500,000 ($3,505,943 in 2025) to purchase new locomotives. In 2014, the PMR sold locomotive 7063 and purchased two NRE 2GS14B locomotives. The NRE 2GS14B locomotives were more energy-efficient than their previous locomotives.

Locomotives operated by the Port Manatee Railroad
Model	Road No.	Builder	Build date	Disposition
NRE 2GS14B	1001	NRE	2014	Operational
NRE 2GS14B	1011	NRE	2014	Operational
EMD GP9RM	7063	EMD	1958	Sold
EMD GP8	7972	EMD	1953	Sold
EMD GP8	7974	EMD	1953	Sold
ALCO S-4	230	ALCO	1954	Sold
ALCO S-2	1004	ALCO	1943	Sold
