= KLW SE24B =

American diesel switcher locomotive

KLW SE20B KLW SE24B
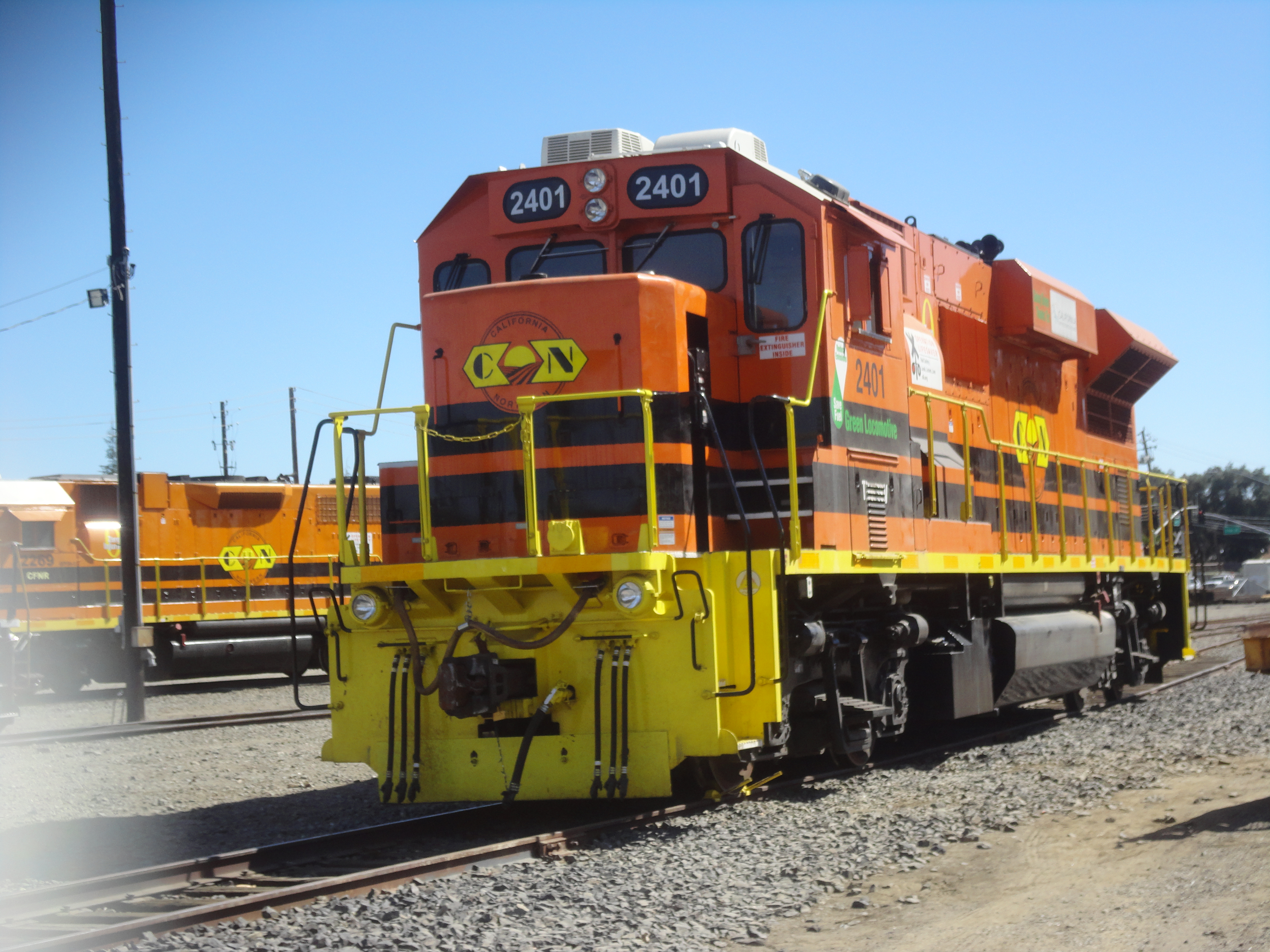
- An SE24B owned by the California Northern Railroad
Type and origin
- Power type: Diesel-electric
- Builder: Knoxville Locomotive Works
- Model: SE20B; SE24B
- Build date: 2011 – present
- Total produced: 1 SE20B demonstrator 6+ SE24Bs
Specifications
- Gauge: 4 ft 8 1/2 in (1,435 mm)
- Prime mover: MTU Series 4000 12V R54
Performance figures
- Power output: SE20B: 2,250 hp (1,680 kW); SE24B: 2,400 hp (1,790 kW)
Career
- Operators: See list

The KLW SE24B or KLW SE20B is a low-emissions diesel switcher locomotive built by Knoxville Locomotive Works (KLWX). It is powered by a single MTU Series 4000 12V R54 (TIER 3) diesel engine which develops a total power output of 2,400 horsepower (1,790 kW). To date, one SE20B locomotive has been produced for KLWX, and it operates on the Gulf and Ohio Railways. Furthermore, at least 6 SE24B locomotives have also been produced, including for the San Joaquin Valley Railroad.

== Original buyers ==
=== SE20B ===
Railroad	Quantity	Road numbers	Notes
Knoxville Locomotive Works	1	KLWX 2250	Demonstrator. Rebuilt from ex-NS EMD GP38 2002
Total	1		

== NZE15B ==
Railroad	Quantity	Road numbers	Notes
Napa Valley Wine Train	1	1864	Acquired beginning in 2023. Rebuilt from ex-CSX NRE 3GS21B #1304.
Total	+1		

=== SE24B ===
Railroad	Quantity	Road numbers	Notes
San Joaquin Valley Railroad	6	2405-2410	Acquired beginning in 2019. Rebuilt from ex-CSX NRE 3GS21B and 2GS14B locomotives
California Northern Railroad	3	2401-2403	Acquired beginning in 2019. Rebuilt from ex-CSX NRE 3GS21B locomotives
Total	+9		

== See also ==
- Knoxville Locomotive Works
- National Railway Equipment, which originally manufactured the locomotives used to produce the SE24Bs
