= NRE 2GS16B-AU =

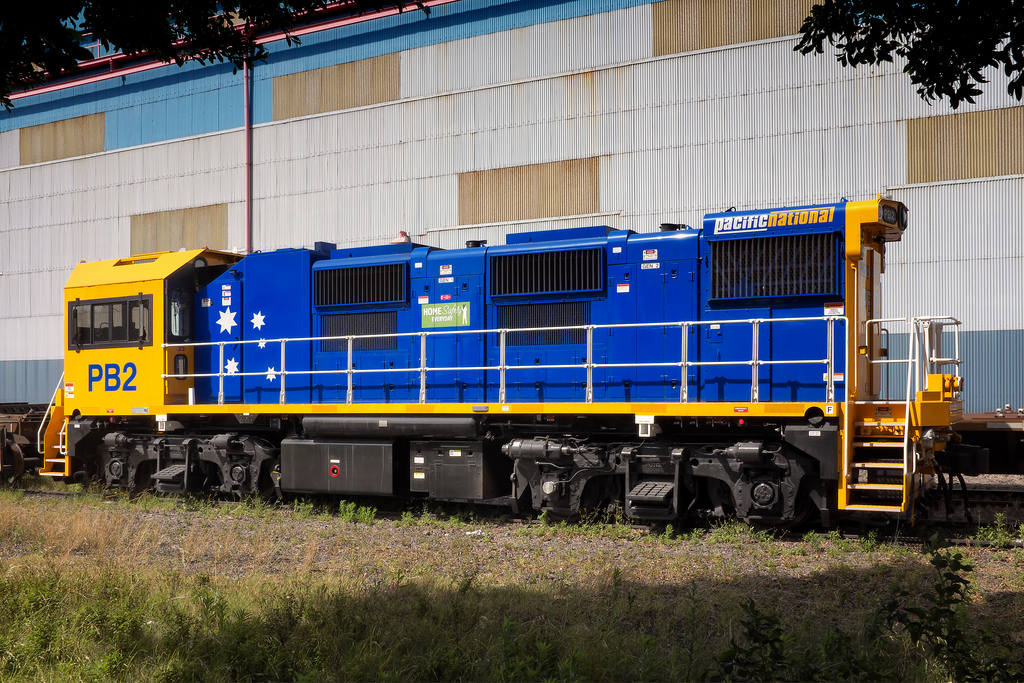
- Watco PB2 locomotives
Type and origin
- Power type: Genset
- Builder: National Railway Equipment Company
- Model: 2GS16
- Build date: 2014
- Total produced: 7
Specifications
- Configuration
  - UIC: Bo-Bo
- Gauge: 1,435 mm (4 ft 8 1/2 in)
- Length: 15.44 metres
- Width: 2.92 metres
- Height: 4.20 metres
- Loco weight: 91 tonnes
- Fuel type: Diesel
- Prime mover: 2 x Cummins QSK19C
- Alternator: Marathon
- Traction motors: 4 x Electro Motive Diesel D78
- Cylinders: Inline 6
Performance figures
- Maximum speed: 80km/h
- Power output: 1,600 hp
Career
- Operators: Watco Australia
- Class: PB
- Number in class: 7
- Numbers: PB1-PB7
- Locale: Port Kembla Steelworkers
- Delivered: 2014
- First run: 2014
- Current owner: Watco Australia
- Disposition: 7 in service

The NRE 2GS16B-AU is a genset locomotive manufactured by National Railway Equipment Company, Paducah, Kentucky for use in Australia.

== History ==
In 2014, Pacific National took delivery of seven NRE 2GS16Bs to replace its remaining D16 and D35 class locomotives on its BlueScope services in Port Kembla.

The locomotives have been used by Watco to shunt the Port Kembla steelworks for BlueScope since 2021.

== Operations ==
Since the replacing of the very dated D16 and D35 classes, the PB class has been employed to work the steel loading process in Port Kembla Steelworks.

== Summary ==
Owner	Class	Number in class	Road numbers	Built	Notes
Watco Australia	PB	7	PB1-PB7	2014	Purchased from Pacific National in late 2021, restricted to shunting the Port Kembla steelworks
