= MAUP =

The abbreviation MAUP may refer to:

- Modifiable areal unit problem
- Port Manatee Terminal Railroad (reporting mark MAUP)
- Interregional Academy of Personnel Management (whose Ukrainian transliteration (Ukrainian: МАУП) is often used in English)
