= Napa Valley Railroad =

Napa Valley Railroad may refer to:

- Napa Valley Railroad (1864–1869), predecessor of the Southern Pacific Company
- Napa Valley Wine Train
