= DB class =

DB class may refer to:

- New Zealand DB class locomotive, diesel-electric locomotives
- Westrail DB class, diesel-electric locomotives
