= D35 =

D35 may refer to:

== Vehicles ==
=== Aircraft ===
- Beechcraft D35, an American single-engine aircraft
- Dewoitine D.35, a French single-engine passenger aircraft

=== Automobiles ===
- New Flyer D35, a high-floor transit bus

=== Rail transport ===
- BHP Port Kembla D35 class, a class of diesel locomotives
- LNER Class D35, a class of British steam locomotives

=== Ships ===
- HMS Diamond (D35), a Daring-class destroyer of the Royal Navy
- HMS Dragon (D35), a Type 45 destroyer of the Royal Navy
- HMS Wrestler (D35), a V and W-class destroyer of the Royal Navy

== Other uses ==
- D35 motorway (Czech Republic)
- D35 road (Croatia)
- Queen's Gambit Declined, a chess opening
- Martin D35 Dreadnought Acoustic Guitar
