= Watco Australia WRA Class =

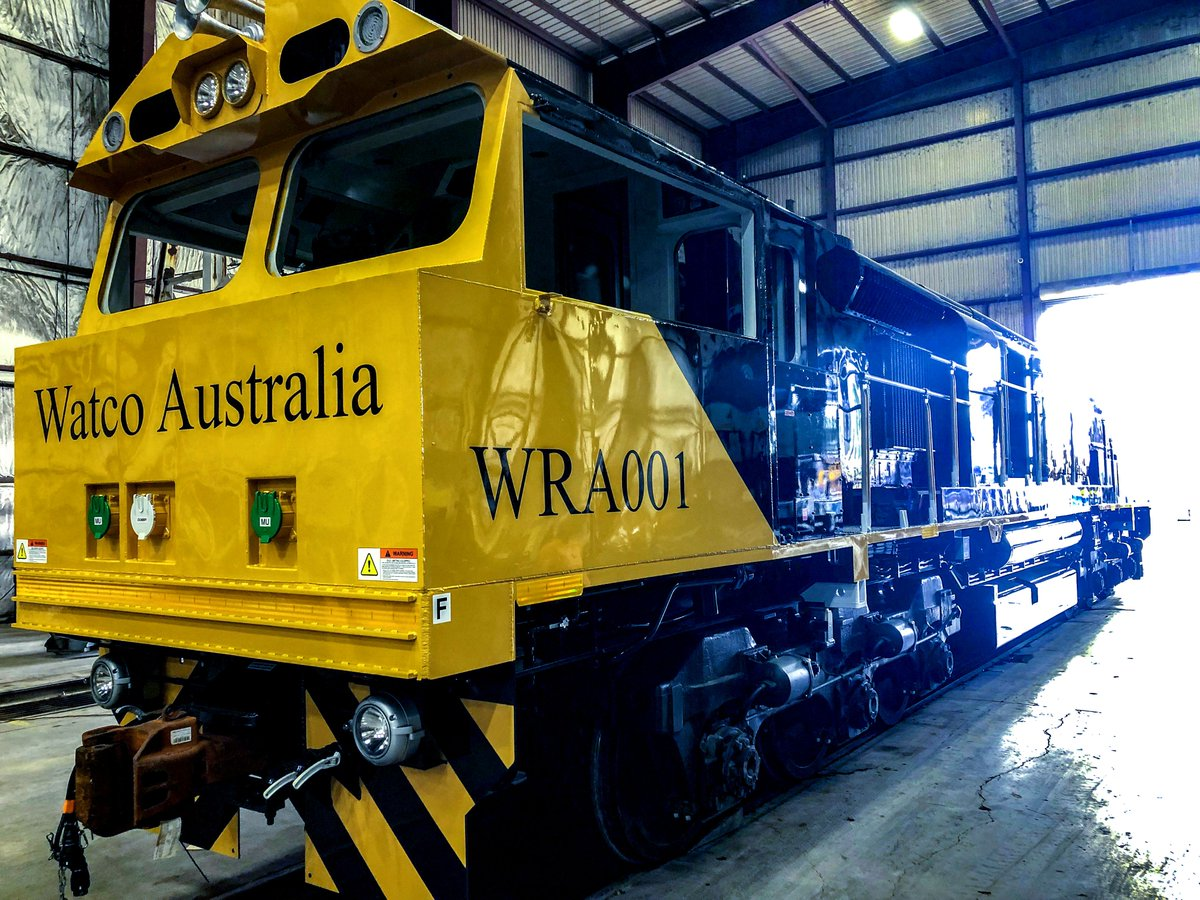
Type and origin
- Power type: Diesel-electric
- Builder: National Railway Equipment Company
- Model: NREC E2250CC
Specifications
- Configuration
  - AAR: C-C
  - UIC: Co'Co'
- Gauge: 1,067 mm (3 ft 6 in)
- Axle load: 15,750 kg (34,720 lb)
- Loco weight: 94,500 kg (208,300 lb)
- Prime mover: EMD 12-645E3B
- Engine type: V12 Diesel engine
- Alternator: EMD AR10/D14
- Traction motors: GE761
Performance figures
- Maximum speed: 100 km/h (62 mph)
- Power output: 2,250 hp (1,680 kW)
- Tractive effort: 250 kN (56,000 lbf)
Career
- Operators: Watco Australia
- Number in class: 8
- Numbers: WRA001–WRA008

The Watco Australia WRA Class is an Australian diesel-electric locomotive, built by the National Railway Equipment Company in the United States for use on Watco Australia's services in Queensland.

== History ==
In 2018, Watco Australia announced the order of 8 of the WRA Class locomotives for use on the Queensland Rail network. They are equipped with a V12 diesel prime mover, rated at 1.6MW. The locomotive is similar in specification to local units, such as the 2300 class. They have been modified to work in multi with Watco's other motive power.

== Accident ==
On 23 May 2024, WRA 008 and 005 were involved in a derailment at Gooray Road Level Crossing, approximately 41 kilometres west of Goondiwindi on the South Western Line. These two locomotives were on grain train 6839 bound for the Port of Brisbane.

At 1:25 pm, the train collided with a truck carrying a bobcat loader, causing both locomotives and the first 14 wagons to derail. The train crew and truck driver escaped serious injury. WRA 008 and 005 remain out of service, as 008 was cut up on site for transport, and 005 was damaged beyond repair.

== Delivery to Australia ==
On 16 August 2019, Watco Australia announced that the first two units were being delivered to Australia. WRA001 and 002 arrived at The Port of Brisbane on the vessel Tarago on 9 October 2019 and were transferred to Warwick behind QR locomotive 1724. The company began grain and cattle operations with the locos in 2020 after certification and testing.
