= D16 class =

D16 class or Class D16 may refer to:

- BHP Port Kembla D16 class, diesel-electric locomotives
- LNER Class D16, 4-4-0 steam locomotives
- Pennsylvania Railroad class D16, 4-4-0 steam locomotives
