= Watco Australia =

Rail haulage company in Australia

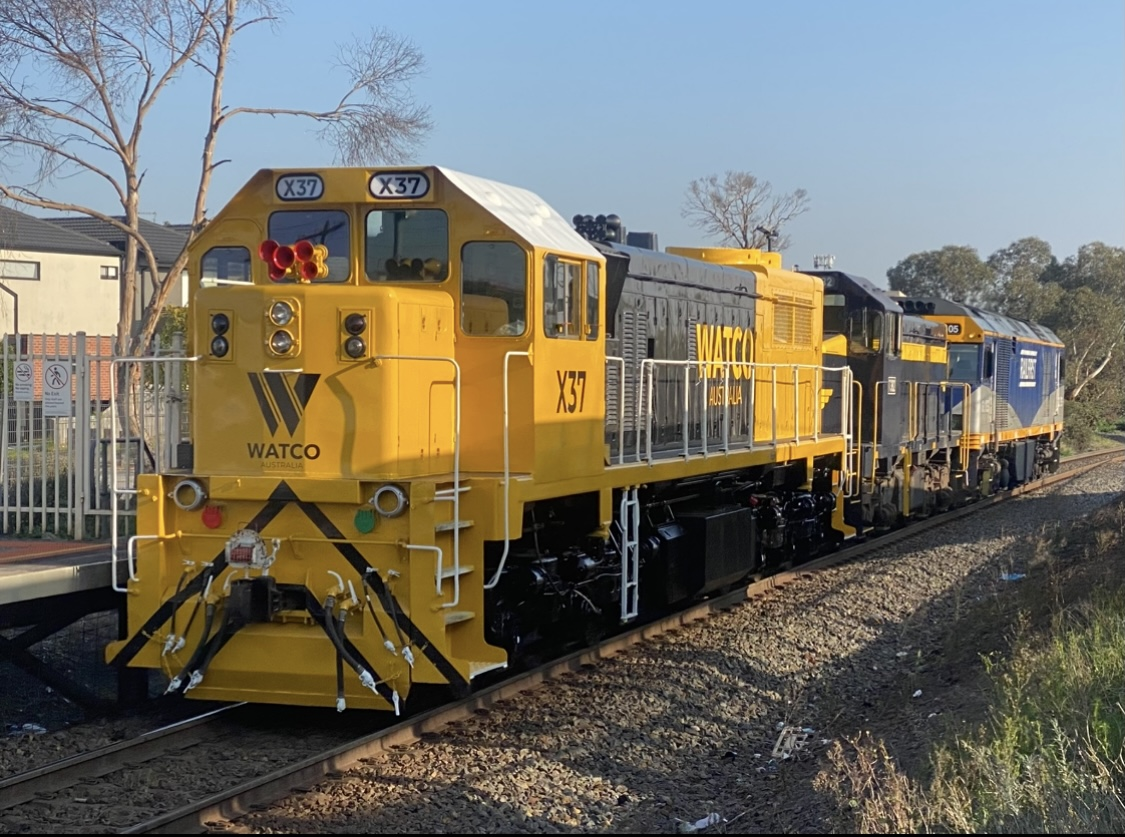
- Type: Subsidiary
- Industry: Rail transport
- Founded: 2010
- Area served: Queensland; Western Australia
- Services: Freight & infrastructure train haulage
- Parent: Watco

Watco Australia is a rail haulage operator that was formed in 2010 to haul grain for the CBH Group in Western Australia. In 2019, it commenced operating in Queensland under a contract with GrainCorp. It is a subsidiary of Watco.

== History ==
In 2009, CBH Group decided to put its rail grain haulage services out to tender for the first time. This work had previously been performed by the Western Australian Government Railways, Australian Western Railroad and QR National. CBH aimed that the amount of grain transported by rail rise from 50% to 70%. CBH settled on a business model that saw it invest in new locomotives and grain wagons, with day-to-day operations contracted out.

In December 2010, CBH awarded Watco WA Rail a ten-year contract to operate services in the south of Western Australia. To operate the services, CBH purchased 22 CBH class locomotives from MotivePower, Boise, and 574 grain wagons from Bradken, Xuzhou. The cost of this rolling stock was $175 million.

Under the agreement, Watco was responsible for providing a comprehensive rail logistics planning service, including train planning and scheduling, tracking, maintenance, inventory control and crew management. Watco operates and maintains the rolling stock, with ownership remaining with CBH.

The services linked various CBH grain collection points in the wheatbelt with CBH terminal and port facilities in Albany, Geraldton and Kwinana. CBH operate on the Arc Infrastructure managed open access network. Watco transported an average of 10-12 million tonnes (368-441 million bushels) of grain from 192 country reception sites to CBH's four export terminals.

Although the contract officially commenced on 1 May 2012, Watco operated its first service on 30 March 2012. Because of a delay in the delivery of the rolling stock, QR National continued to operate some 3 ft 6 in (1,067 mm) gauge services until October 2012, while to operate standard gauge services, locomotives were hired from Chicago Freight Car Leasing Australia and SCT Logistics. A further three locomotives were delivered in 2015 as compensation for late delivery of the original order.

In 2016, Watco Australia was awarded an infrastructure train contract by Brookfield Rail to operate infrastructure trains with two 422 class locomotives purchased from CFCL Australia. In December 2016, Watco acquired a majority shareholding in Intermodal Group, a Western Australian intermodal container transport group. In July 2017, Watco took over the operation of the Forrestfield to Fremantle Harbour intermodal container service from SCT Logistics with flat wagons purchased from CFCL Australia.

In late 2019, Watco Australia commenced operations in Queensland under a seven-year contract with GrainCorp. Eight WRA class locomotives from the National Railway Equipment Company and 128 wagons (designated DGWY) from CRRC in China were ordered. Seven WRB class and one WRC class were repatriated from Transnet Freight Rail in South Africa.

When next tendered, the CBH Group contract was awarded to Aurizon. Although scheduled to transition in May 2022, all parties agreed to bring the handover date forward to September 2021.

== Fleet ==
Class	Image	Built	Number	Unit numbers	Notes
Standard Gauge (4' 81/2" / 1,435mm)
1200 class		2013	2	1201-1202	Acquired from the National Railway Equipment Company in late 2021
FL class		1970	1	FL220	Acquired from CFCLA November 2016, originally NSW Railways 42220
G class		1984	1	G511	Acquired from CFCLA 2017, originally owned by V/Line
H class		1969	3	H2, H3, H5	Acquired from the Ettamogha Rail Hub in mid-2023. Used to shunt the Port Kembla steelworks
HL class		1969	1	HL203	Acquired from CFCLA November 2016, originally NSW Railways 42203
PB class		2014	7	PB1-7	Acquired from Pacific National in late 2021. Used to shunt the Port Kembla steelworks
T class		1964	5	T369, T373, T376, T377, T404	T369, T373, T376 and T377 acquired from CFCLA in 2021 and T404 from SCT Logistics in 2023. Originally owned by the Victorian Railways and later V/Line
X class		1970	1	X37	Acquired from the Seymour Railway Heritage Centre in mid 2025, undergoing reactivation in Western Australia
Narrow Gauge (3' 6" / 1,067mm)
DBZ class		1982-1983	10	DBZ2301-DBZ2308, DBZ2312-DBZ2313	Ex Westrail DB class
DR class		1971	2	DR1564-65	Ex TasRail D class, originally WAGR D1564-65
WRA class		2019	8	WRA001-008	For GrainCorp contract in Queensland
WRB class		1982	8	WRB2173, 2174, 2177, 2180, 2181, 2183, 2184, 2188	For GrainCorp and cattle contract in Queensland, repatriated from Transnet Freight Rail in South Africa after being sold by Aurizon
WRC class		1984	6	WRC2202, 2204, 2205, 2206, 2209, 2210	For GrainCorp and cattle contract in Queensland, repatriated from Transnet Freight Rail in South Africa after being sold by Aurizon
WRD class		2005	4	WRD2251, 2252, 2257,2266	For GrainCorp and cattle contract in Queensland, repatriated from Transnet Freight Rail in South Africa after being sold by Aurizon
WRE class		1967	2	WRE1723, 1762	For GrainCorp and cattle contract in Queensland, repatriated from Transnet Freight Rail in South Africa after being sold by Aurizon

== Leased Fleet ==
Watco also have multiple locomotives leased to bolster their standard gauge operations.

Class	Image	Built	Number	Unit numbers	Notes
GML class		1990	1	GML10	Leased From QUBE
