= KLW SE15B =

Model of low-emissions diesel switcher locomotive

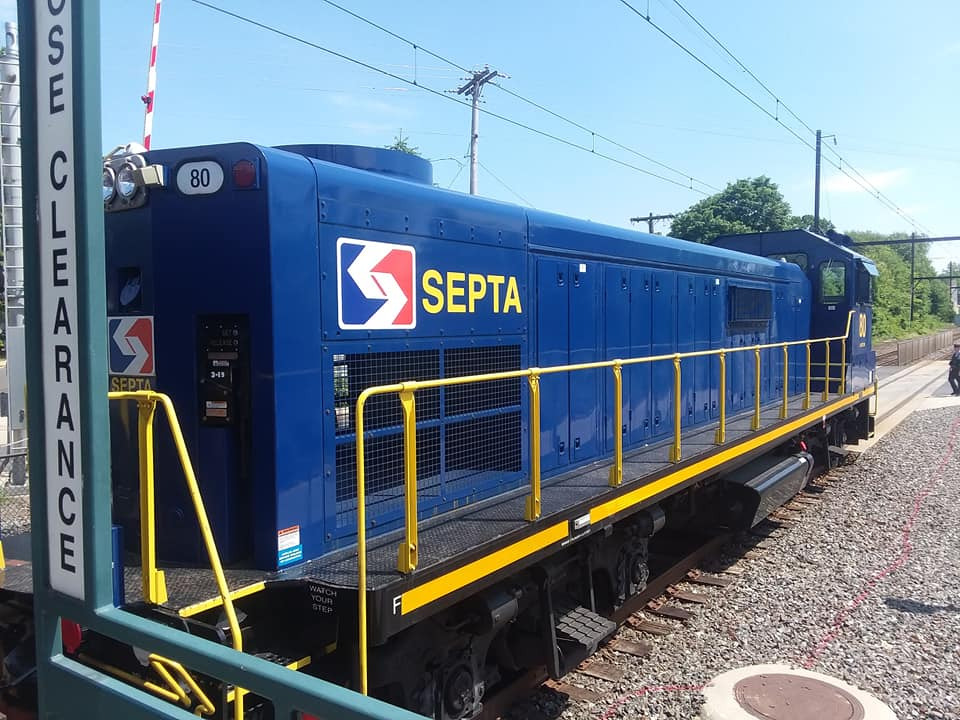
- SEPTA KLW SE15B 80.
Type and origin
- Power type: Diesel-electric
- Builder: Knoxville Locomotive Works (KLW)
- Model: SE15B
- Build date: December 2016 – Present
- Total produced: unknown
Specifications
- Gauge: 4 ft 8 1/2 in (1,435 mm)
- Prime mover: MTU Series 2000
Performance figures
- Power output: 1,560 hp (1,160 kW)
Career
- Operators: See list

The KLW SE15B is a low-emissions diesel switcher locomotive built by Knoxville Locomotive Works. It is powered by a single MTU Series 2000 engine which develops a total power output of 1,560 horsepower (1,160 kW). An unknown number SE15B locomotives is being produced for Chevron to be used in the refineries of Houston and Beaumont-Port Arthur, TX.

== Original buyers ==
Railroad	Quantity	Notes
Knoxville Locomotive Works	2	Demonstrators numbered KLWX 1502 (rebuilt from former NW GP9 667) and KLWX 1935 (rebuilt from former CO GP9 6249)
Chevron (Texas)	?+	
Richmond Pacific	2	
SEPTA	1	Built from former SFS 92 exx AT&SF 2075 née 2861.
Canton Railroad	2	#1906 / 1987.
Western Milling Company	3	Numbered WEMX 1501-1503; reportedly designated as SE18B locomotives. Used in grain mills in Hanford, Famoso, and Goshen, respectively.
Total	Unknown	

== See also ==
- List of KLW locomotives
- List of GM-EMD locomotives
