= KLW SE10B =

Low-emissions diesel switcher locomotive

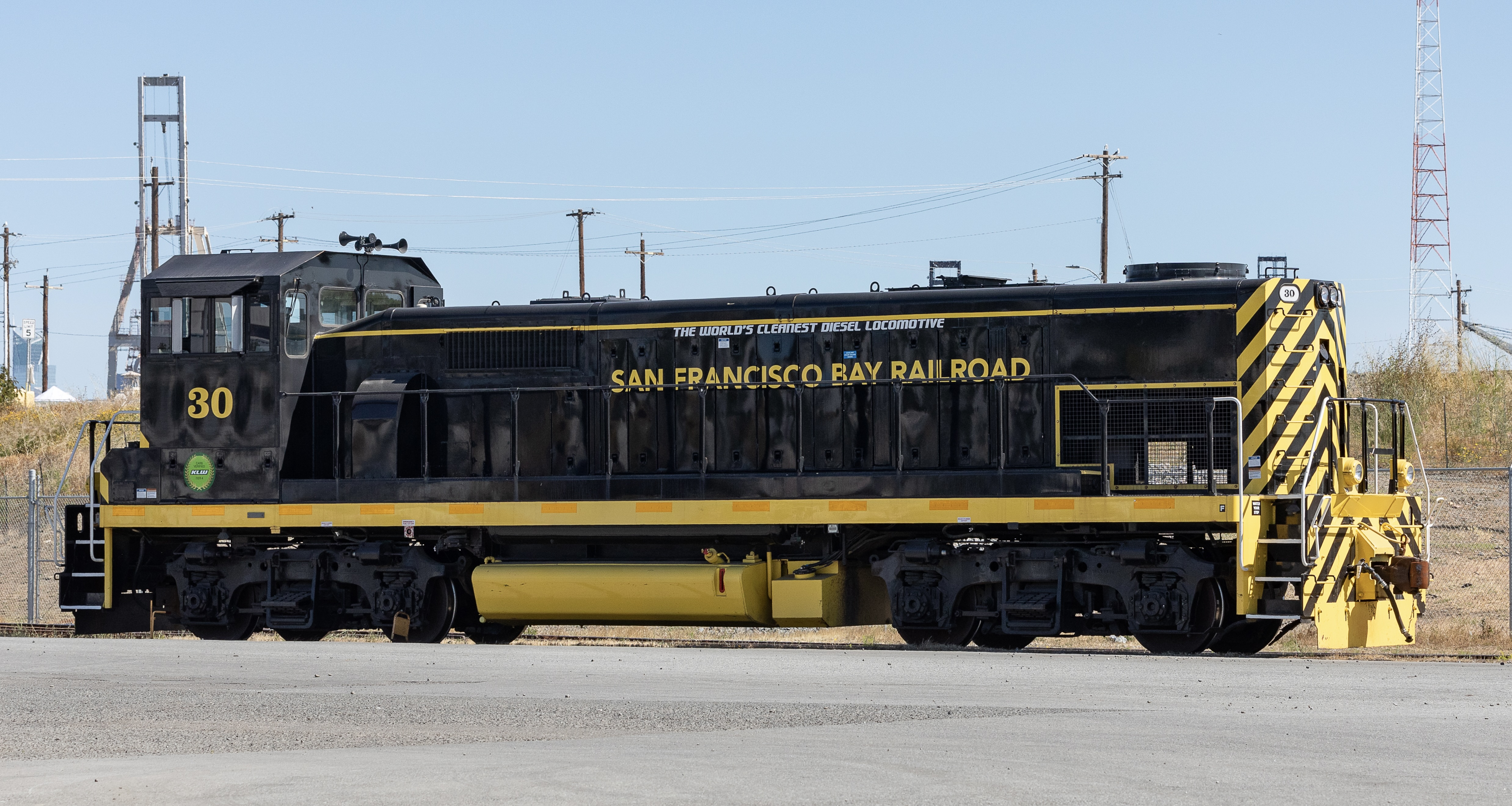
- San Francisco Bay Railroad #30 in June 2023
Type and origin
- Power type: Diesel-electric
- Builder: Knoxville Locomotive Works (KLW)
- Model: SE10B
- Build date: August 2015 – Present
- Total produced: 10
Specifications
- Gauge: 4 ft 8 1/2 in (1,435 mm)
- Prime mover: MTU Series 2000
Performance figures
- Power output: 1,050 hp (783 kW)
Career
- Operators: See list

The KLW SE10B is a low-emissions diesel switcher locomotive built by Knoxville Locomotive Works. It is powered by a single MTU Series 2000 engine which develops a total power output of 1,050 horsepower (783 kW). There have been three SE10B locomotives produced for New York New Jersey Rail, and 5 have been produced for Chevron to be used in the refineries of Houston and Beaumont-Port Arthur, Texas.

== Original buyers ==
Railroad	Quantity	Road numbers	Notes
New York New Jersey Rail (NYNJR)	3	5101 - 5103	
Chevron (Texas)	5	1001 - 1005	
San Francisco Belt Railroad (California)	1	30	Replaced Alco S-2 #25
Stockton Terminal and Eastern Railroad (California)	1	1050	
Total	10		

== See also ==
- List of KLW locomotives
- List of GM-EMD locomotives
