= NRE 1GS7B =

Diesel switcher locomotive

Type and origin
- Power type: Diesel-electric
- Builder: National Railway Equipment (NREC)
- Model: 1GS7B
- Build date: September 2008 – Present
- Total produced: 7
Specifications
- Configuration
  - AAR: B-B
  - UIC: Bo'Bo'
- Gauge: 4 ft 8 1/2 in (1,435 mm)
- Prime mover: Cummins QSK19C
- Engine type: Straight-six engine
- Aspiration: Turbocharger
- Cylinders: 6
Performance figures
- Power output: 700 hp (522 kW)
Career
- Operators: See list

The NRE 1GS7B is a low-emissions diesel switcher locomotive built by National Railway Equipment. It is powered by a single Cummins QSK19C I6 engine which develops a total power output of 700 horsepower (522 kW). There have been nine 1GS7B locomotives produced to date, manufactured at NREC's Mount Vernon shops in Southern Illinois, and at NREC's Dixmoor shops. It's also the only current single-engine switcher marketed in NRE's N-ViroMotive catalog.

== Original Buyers ==
Railroad	Quantity	Road numbers	Notes
Alliance Grain Terminal	1	2605	
Bunge	4	8001-8004	
National Railway Equipment	1	700	Demonstration Unit
Northrop Grumman	1	507	
Viterra	3	2010, 2020, 2030	
Wisconsin Public Services	1	100	
Total	7		

== See also ==
- List of NRE locomotives
