= KLW SE32C =

Low-emissions diesel-electric locomotive

Type and origin
- Power type: Diesel-electric
- Builder: Knoxville Locomotive Works (KLW)
- Model: SE32C
- Build date: 2015 – Present
- Total produced: 5
Specifications
- Gauge: 4 ft 8 1/2 in (1,435 mm)
- Fuel type: Diesel
- Prime mover: MTU Series 4000 16V R54
- Engine type: V16 Diesel Engine
- Aspiration: Turbocharger
- Traction motors: 6 x
- Cylinders: 16
- Transmission: Diesel-electric
- MU working: Yes
- Loco brake: Dynamic, Westinghouse air brake
- Train brakes: Westinghouse air brake
Performance figures
- Power output: 3,200 hp (2,390 kW)
Career
- Operators: See list

The KLW SE32C is a low-emissions diesel road locomotive built by Knoxville Locomotive Works. It is powered by a single MTU Series 4000 16V R54 (TIER 3) diesel engine which develops a total power output of 3,200 horsepower (2,390 kW). To date, five SE32C locomotives have been produced with three such models being delivered to the Lancaster and Chester Railroad in November 2022.

== Original buyers ==
Railroad	Quantity	Road numbers	Notes
Yadkin Valley Railroad	1	YVRR 3200	
Mojave Northern Railroad	1	MN 419	
Lancaster and Chester	3	LC 3201-3203	
Total	5		

== See also ==
- List of GM-EMD locomotives
