= NRE E-3000E3B =

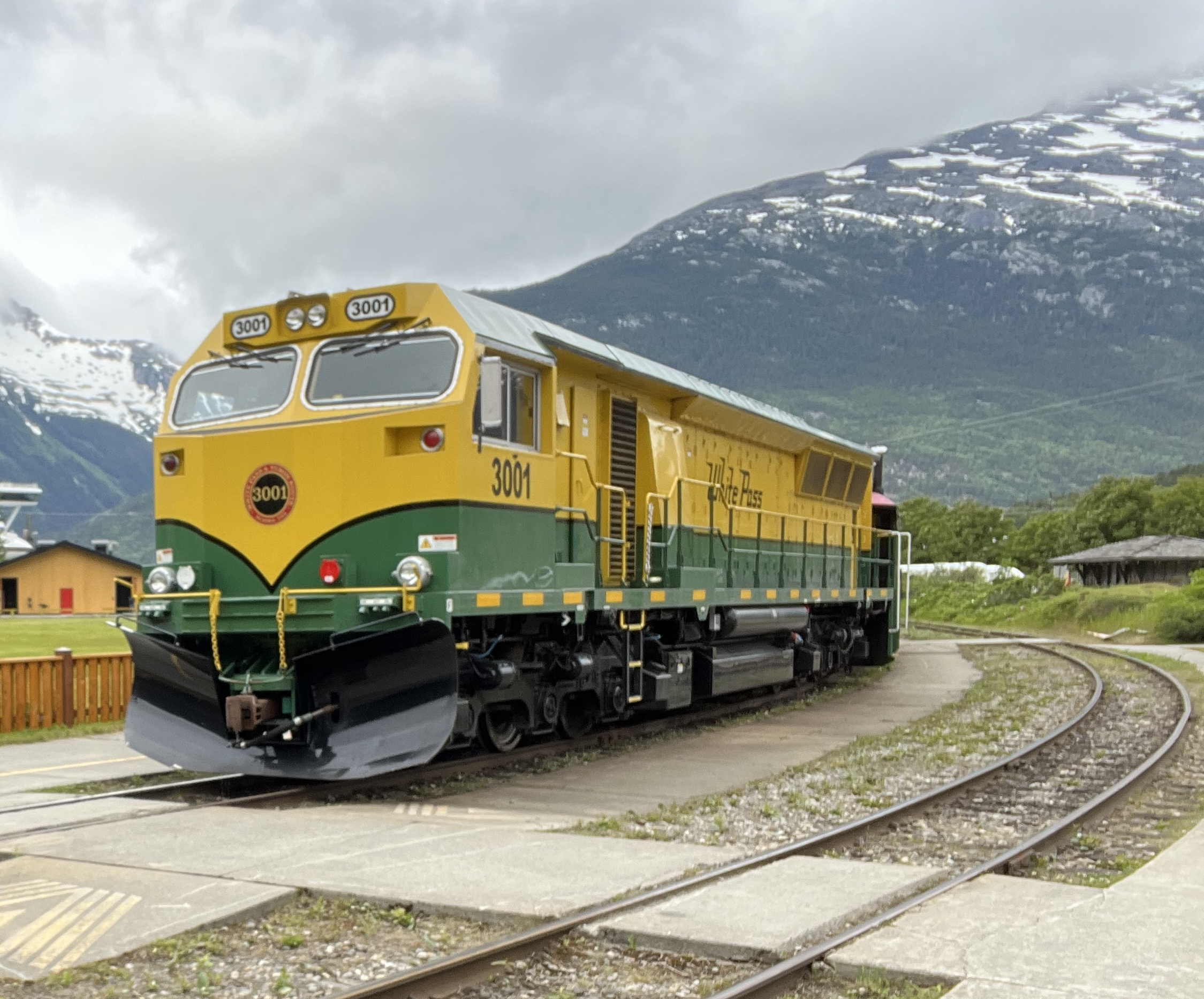
- An E-3000CC-DC operating on the White Pass and Yukon Route
Type and origin
- Power type: Diesel-Electric
- Builder: National Railway Equipment Company, Mount Vernon, Illinois
- Model: E-3000E3B
- Build date: 2011-present
- Total produced: 14
Specifications
- Configuration
  - Whyte: Co-Co
- Gauge: 4 ft 8 1/2 in (1,435 mm) standard gauge 3 ft (914 mm)
- Length: 20.0 m (65 ft 7 in)
- Loco weight: 134 tonnes (132 long tons; 148 short tons)
- Prime mover: EMD 16-645E3C
- Alternator: EMD AR10
- Traction motors: EMD EMD D78
Performance figures
- Maximum speed: 115 km/h (71 mph)
- Power output: 2,461 kW (3,300 hp)
Career
- Operators: Qube; White Pass and Yukon Route
- Class: Qube: 1100; WP&Y: E3000CC-DC
- Delivered: 2011-present
- First run: 2011

The E-3000E3B is a diesel locomotive designed and built by National Railway Equipment Company for export to Australia.

== Operators ==
=== Qube ===
Qube ordered 12 units in 2011 as the 1100 class. The first were delivered in December 2011 and the next seven in 2012.

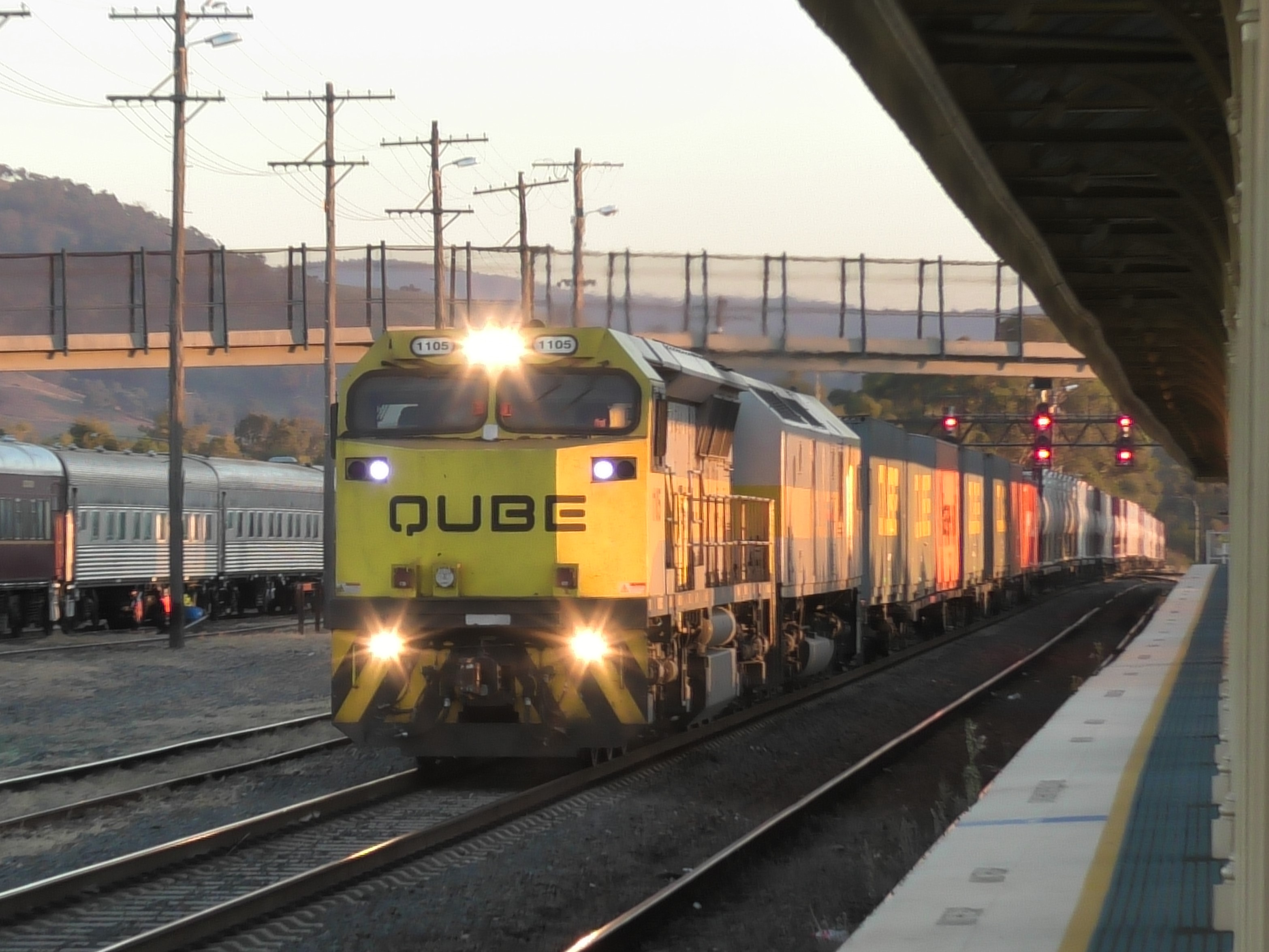
Qube 1100 class

=== White Pass and Yukon Route ===
The White Pass and Yukon Route placed an order for six units, classed as E3000CC-DC in 2020. Four units had been built for Qube in 2012, but never delivered.

== Summary ==
Operator	Class	Number in class	Road numbers	Built	Notes
Qube	1100	8	1101-1108	2011-2012	4 more (1109-1112) ordered but never delivered, sold to White Pass & Yukon Route
White Pass and Yukon Route	E3000CC-DC	6	3001-3006	2020	3001-3004 originally built for Qube; 3 ft gauge w/ NRE 5650 trucks and GE764 traction motors
