= NRE 3GS24C-DE-AU =

NRE 3GS24C
Type and origin
- Power type: Genset
- Builder: National Railway Equipment Company
- Model: 3GS24C
- Build date: 2013
- Total produced: 5
Specifications
- Configuration
  - UIC: Co-Co
- Gauge: 1,435 mm (4 ft 8 1/2 in)
- Length: 18.6 metres
- Width: 2.9 metres
- Height: 3.9 metres
- Loco weight: 114 tonnes
- Fuel type: Diesel
- Prime mover: 3 x Cummins QSK19C
- Alternator: Marathon
- Traction motors: Electro Motive Diesel D78
- Cylinders: Inline 6
Career
- Class: 1200
- Number in class: 2
- Numbers: 1201-02
- Delivered: 2013
- First run: April 2013
- Current owner: Watco Australia
- Disposition: 2 in service

The NRE 3GS24C is a genset locomotive manufactured by National Railway Equipment Company, Paducah, Kentucky for use in Australia.

== History ==
Five members of the class were built for El Zorro. However, before they had left the United States, El Zorro collapsed.

In May 2013, two were unloaded at Port Kembla as demonstrators.

After being demonstrated, they were stored at Broadmeadow. In December 2014, they were hauled to Islington Railway Workshops and are scheduled to enter service with Bowmans Rail hauling containerised hay trains from Bowmans. The other three remain in store in the United States. Unit 1203 was sold to Caraminer S.A., a subsidiary of the Central Railway Construction Company (CCFC) of Uruguay, to be used in trackwork trains. It was shipped in March 2021 from USA.

== Summary ==
Owner	Class	Number in class	Road numbers	Built	Notes
Watco Australia	1200	2	1201-1202	2013	Originally ordered by El Zorro before they ceased trading, Sold to Watco Australia in late 2021.
Caraminer S.A.	1200	1	1203	2013	Originally ordered by El Zorro before they ceased trading, Sold to Caraminer S.A. in early 2021.
National Railway Equipment Company	1200	2	1204-1205	2013	Originally ordered by El Zorro before they ceased trading, Stored in the United States, future unknown.
