= NRE 2GS14B =

American diesel locomotive

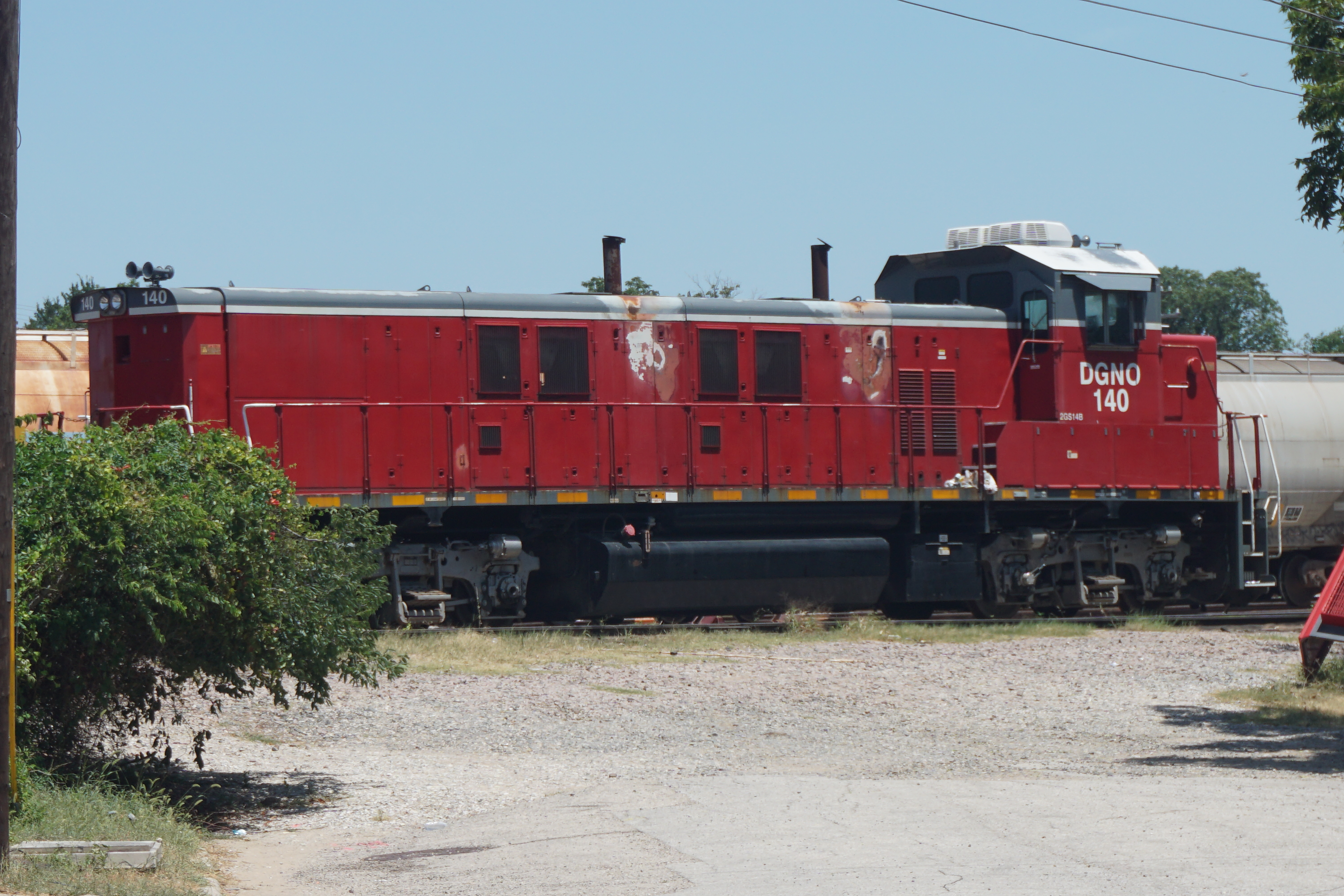
- Dallas, Garland and Northeastern Railroad NRE 2GS14B No. 140
Type and origin
- Power type: Diesel-electric
- Builder: National Railway Equipment (NREC)
- Model: 2GS14B
- Build date: December 2005 – Present
- Total produced: 10
Specifications
- Gauge: 4 ft 8 1/2 in (1,435 mm)
- Prime mover: Cummins QSK19C (×2)
- Engine type: Diesel engine
- Aspiration: Turbocharger
- Cylinders: 6 (×2)
Performance figures
- Power output: 1,400 hp (1,040 kW)

The NRE 2GS14B is a low-emissions diesel switcher locomotive built by National Railway Equipment. It is powered by two Cummins QSK19C I6 engines with each one developing 700 horsepower (522 kW) and creating a total power output of 1,400 horsepower (1,040 kW). At least 7 2GS14B genset locomotives have been produced to date, with the majority of these units being manufactured at NREC's Mount Vernon shops in Southern Illinois.

== Original Buyers ==
Railroad	Quantity	Road numbers	Notes
Belt Railway of Chicago	1	140	
CSX Transportation	4	1316-1319	1318 and 1319 were sold to SJVR for rebuilding into NZE24B locomotives by KLW. They are now numbers 2408 and 2409 respectively. Remaining units sold to KXHR.
Dallas, Garland & Northeastern	2	140-141	
Fort Worth & Western Railroad	2	2013-2014	
Gerdau Ameristeel	3	2286-2288	
Northwoods Pulp & Timber	1	104	
National Railway Equipment	2	1400, 2007	1400 is a demonstrator; 2007 sold to Orange Port Terminal
Odfjell	1	1400	
Orange Port Terminal Railroad	2	2220-2221	
SEPTA	1	70	
Union Pacific	1	Y2005	
Total	18		
