= WAGR D class (diesel) =

Western Australian Government Railways D/DA Class
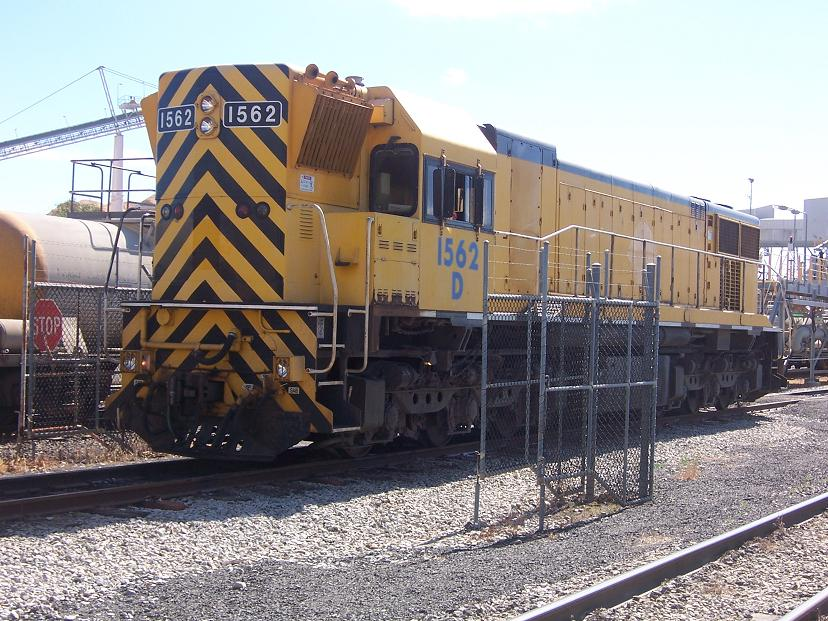
- D1562 at Bunbury Port in January 2004
Type and origin
- Power type: Diesel-electric
- Builder: Clyde Engineering, Granville, New South Wales
- Model: EMD G26CU
- Build date: 1971–1972
- Total produced: 12
Specifications
- Configuration
  - AAR: C-C
  - UIC: Co′Co′
- Gauge: 1,067 mm (3 ft 6 in)
- Length: 17.2 m (56 ft 5 in)
- Loco weight: D: 109.7 tonnes (108.0 long tons; 120.9 short tons); DA: 97.5 tonnes (96.0 long tons; 107.5 short tons)
- Fuel type: Diesel
- Prime mover: EMD 16-645E
- Generator: EMD D32
- Traction motors: EMD 548
- Loco brake: D: Dynamic; DA:Air
Performance figures
- Power output: 1,491 kW (2,000 hp)
Career
- Operators: Western Australian Government Railways
- Number in class: 12
- Numbers: D1561–D1565; DA1571–DA1577
- First run: February 1971
- Current owner: Aurizon; Ferrocarril de Antofagasta a Bolivia; Genesee & Wyoming Australia
- Disposition: 4 in service, 2 stored, 5 unknown, 1 scrapped

The D/DA class are a class of diesel locomotives built by Clyde Engineering, Granville for the Western Australian Government Railways in 1971–1972.

== History ==
Five D class were ordered by the Western Australian Government Railways to haul bauxite services. These were followed by seven DA class locomotives. These differed in not having dynamic brakes and were 12 tonnes lighter.

In August 1998, D1564-65 were sold to Tranz Rail and rebuilt with new cabs at Hutt Workshops before being sent to TasRail in June 2001 entering service as 2020–21. The new cabs resembled the cab that was fitted to DXR8007 at the time. In September 1998, D1563 was exported to Chile, where it would be overhauled and operated by the Ferrocarril de Antofagasta a Bolivia.

The remaining nine locomotives were included in the sale of Westrail to Australian Railroad Group in October 2000. When this was split in June 2006, DA 1577 was transferred to Genesee & Wyoming Australia with the South Australian business with the other eight passed to QR National with the Western Australian operations. D1562 and DAZ1902-06 were exported to South Africa in January 2015 and are now owned by APEX Industrial.

== TasRail D class ==
TasRail D Class
Type and origin
- Power type: Diesel-electric
- Builder: Clyde Engineering, Granville
- Model: EMD G26CU
- Build date: 1971
- Total produced: 2
- Rebuilder: Hutt Workshops
- Rebuild date: 2001
- Number rebuilt: 2
Specifications
- Configuration
  - AAR: C-C
  - UIC: Co-Co
- Gauge: 1,067 mm (3 ft 6 in)
- Length: 17.1 m (56 ft 1 in)
- Axle load: 18 tonnes (18 long tons; 20 short tons)
- Loco weight: 111 tonnes (109 long tons; 122 short tons)
- Fuel type: Diesel
- Prime mover: EMD 16-645E
- Generator: EMD D32
- Traction motors: EMD 548
- Loco brake: Hand brakes/Westinghouse 26L air brake/Dynamic
- Train brakes: Westinghouse 26L air brake
Performance figures
- Power output: 1,490 kW (2,000 hp)
Career
- Operators: ATN Tasrail; Pacific National; TasRail; Watco Australia
- Number in class: 2
- Numbers: 2020–2021
- Delivered: 15 June 2001
- First run: 24 July 2001
- Last run: 4 May 2014
- Retired: 2014
- Withdrawn: 2014
- Current owner: Watco Australia
- Disposition: Under overhaul

The two D class locomotives purchased by Tranz Rail in 1998 were rebuilt at Hutt Workshops, as a cheaper alternative to buying new locomotives. Tranz Rail rebuilt the two locomotives before transferring them to ATN Tasrail of which they were a shareholder.

The locomotives were rebuilt with a new design of universal cab with a shorter low hood and more angular appearance (the same cab style used on Tranz Rail's DXR 8007 first cab rebuild). The two locos were repainted into the Wisconsin Central Maroon livery, and were renumbered in the 202X series from the 156X series as they were in Western Australia.

The two locomotives arrived at Bell Bay on 15 June 2001. Because they lacked traction motors when the locos were rebuilt, surplus English Electric EE548 traction motors were fitted to the locos at East Tamar Workshops. The two locos entered service a few months after arrival. Following a large number of traction motor failures, the traction motors were replaced by second hand GM motors in 2009.

=== Withdrawals and disposal ===
With the introduction of the TR class, both were withdrawn in mid-2014. Both were stored at East Tamar Workshops and sold to Watco Australia in 2017 for use on infrastructure trains. D 2020 was shipped from Burnie on 5 May 2017 on Toll ship called the Victorian Reliance, while 2021 was shipped on 13 May on Toll ship named the Tasmanian Achiever. Both locomotives were rebuilt at Bendigo Workshops, Victoria, and shipped to Perth in January 2018. They are currently in service under their original WAGR numbers, albeit classed DR.

== Class list (D) ==
Key:	In Service	Withdrawn	Preserved	Converted	Unknown	Scrapped

Serial number	Date Built	Original Road Number	Renumbered As	Current/Last Owner	Status
70-723	February 1971	D1561	-	Aurizon	Scrapped (September 2011)
70-724	1971	D1562	-	Rovos Rail	For use on Rovos Rail's Pretoria - Dar es Salaam service.
70-725	May 1971	D1563	2001	Ferrocarril de Antofagasta a Bolivia	Exported to Chile
70-726	June 1971	D1564	2020 (TasRail), DR1564 (Watco)	Watco Australia	Rebuilt by Tranz Rail before being sent to TasRail.
70-727	July 1971	D1565	2021 (TasRail), DR1565 (Watco)	Watco Australia	Rebuilt by Tranz Rail before being sent to TasRail.

== Class list (DA) ==
Key:	In Service	Withdrawn	Preserved	Converted	Unknown	Scrapped

Serial number	Date Built	Original road number	Renumbered as	Owner	Status
72-758	April 1972	DA1571	DAZ1901	Aurizon	Stabled at Forrestfield
72-759	1972	DA1572	DAZ1902	APEX Industrial	Exported to South Africa
72-760	1972	DA1573	DAZ1903	APEX Industrial	Exported to South Africa
72-761	1972	DA1574	DAZ1904	APEX Industrial	Exported to South Africa
72-762	1972	DA1575	DAZ1905	APEX Industrial	Exported to South Africa
72-763	1972	DA1576	DAZ1906	APEX Industrial	Exported to South Africa
72-764	October 1972	DA1577	1907	Genesee & Wyoming Australia	Used on the Whyalla-Iron Knob railway

== See also ==
Westrail DB class
