= NRE 2GS36C-DE =

Diesel switcher locomotive

Type and origin
- Power type: Diesel-electric
- Builder: National Railway Equipment Company (NREC)
- Model: 2GS36C-DE
- Build date: August 2011 – Present
Specifications
- Configuration
  - AAR: C-C (UIC: Co'Co' )
- Gauge: 4 ft 8 1/2 in (1,435 mm)
- Loco weight: 419,000 lb (190,000 kg)
- Fuel type: Diesel fuel
- Prime mover: Cummins QSK50L (×2)
- Engine type: V16 diesel (×2)
- Aspiration: Turbocharger
- Cylinders: 16 (×2)
- Loco brake: Pneumatic and Dynamic
Performance figures
- Power output: 3,600 hp (2,680 kW)
- Tractive effort: 126,000 pounds-force (560,000 N)

The NRE 2GS36C-DE is a low-emissions six-axle diesel-electric road switcher locomotive built by National Railway Equipment Company. It is part of NRE's N-ViroMotive line. It is powered by two Cummins QSK50L V16 engines rated at 1,800 horsepower (1,340 kW) each, for a total power output of 3,600 horsepower (2,680 kW). It has a starting tractive force of 126,000 pounds-force (560,000 N), an adhesion rate of 30%, and a minimum continuous speed of 13.9 miles per hour (22.4 km/h). It offers Tier III emissions compliance.

The first demonstration unit was released in August 2011 from NRE's Mount Vernon shops in Southern Illinois. It was built on a refurbished EMD SD40-2 frame.

== Original Buyers ==
Railroad	Quantity	Road numbers	Notes
National Railway Equipment Company	1	3600	Demonstration Unit
