= Westrail DB class =

Class of diesel-electric locomotives

Westrail DB Class
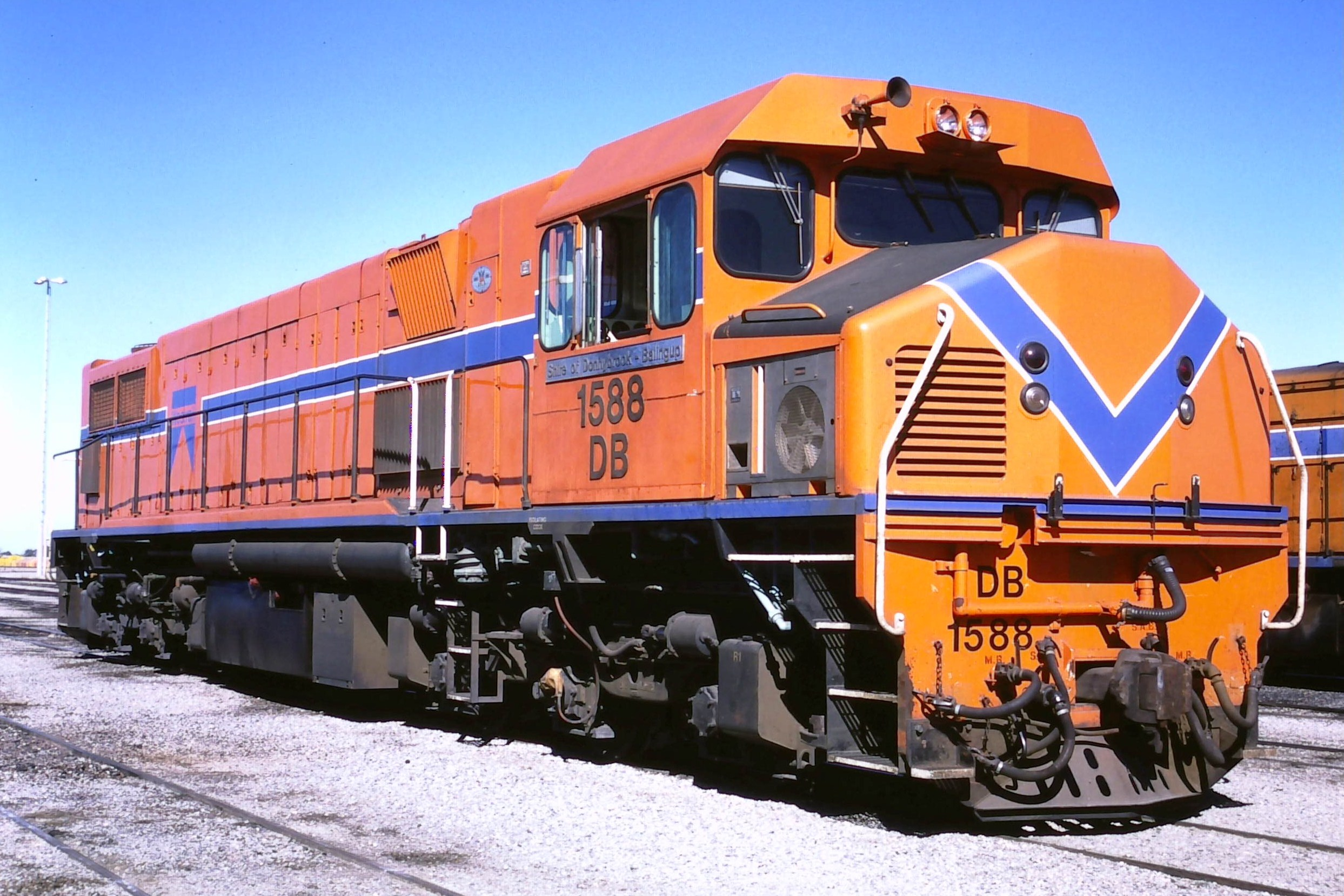
- DB1588 at Forrestfield Marshalling Yard in April 1986.
Type and origin
- Power type: Diesel-electric
- Builder: Clyde Engineering, Rosewater
- Serial number: 81-989 to 81-998; 82-1122 to 82-1124
- Model: EMD G26CU-2
- Build date: 1982-1983
- Total produced: 13
Specifications
- Configuration
  - AAR: C-C
  - UIC: Co-Co
- Gauge: 1,067 mm (3 ft 6 in)
- Bogies: Clyde Hi-Ad
- Wheel diameter: 1,016 mm (40.0 in)
- Length: 18.01 m (59 ft 1.06 in)
- Width: 2.85 m (9 ft 4.20 in)
- Height: 3.95 m (12 ft 11.51 in)
- Axle load: 18 t (18 long tons; 20 short tons)
- Loco weight: 110 t (110 long tons; 120 short tons)
- Fuel type: Diesel
- Fuel capacity: 6,000 L (1,320 imp gal; 1,585 US gal)
- Lubricant cap.: 757 L (167 imp gal; 200 US gal)
- Coolant cap.: 795 L (175 imp gal; 210 US gal)
- Prime mover: EMD 16-645E
- RPM range: 255-900
- Engine type: Diesel
- Aspiration: Roots Blown
- Alternator: EMD AR6-G
- Traction motors: EMD D29 (6 of)
- Cylinders: V16
- Train brakes: Air & Vacuum
Performance figures
- Power output: 1,715 kW (2,300 hp)
- Tractive effort: 322 kN (72,000 lb_{f}) (starting); 269 kN (60,000 lb_{f}) (continuous)
Career
- Operators: Aurizon, Watco Australia
- Number in class: 13
- Numbers: DB1581–DB1593/; DBZ2301–DBZ2313
- Locale: Western Australia
- First run: 27 April 1982
- Current owner: Aurizon, Watco Australia
- Disposition: 2 in service, 10 stored, 1 scrapped

The Westrail DB Class is a class of diesel-electric locomotives built by Clyde Engineering, Rosewater, for Westrail in 1982–1983.

== History ==
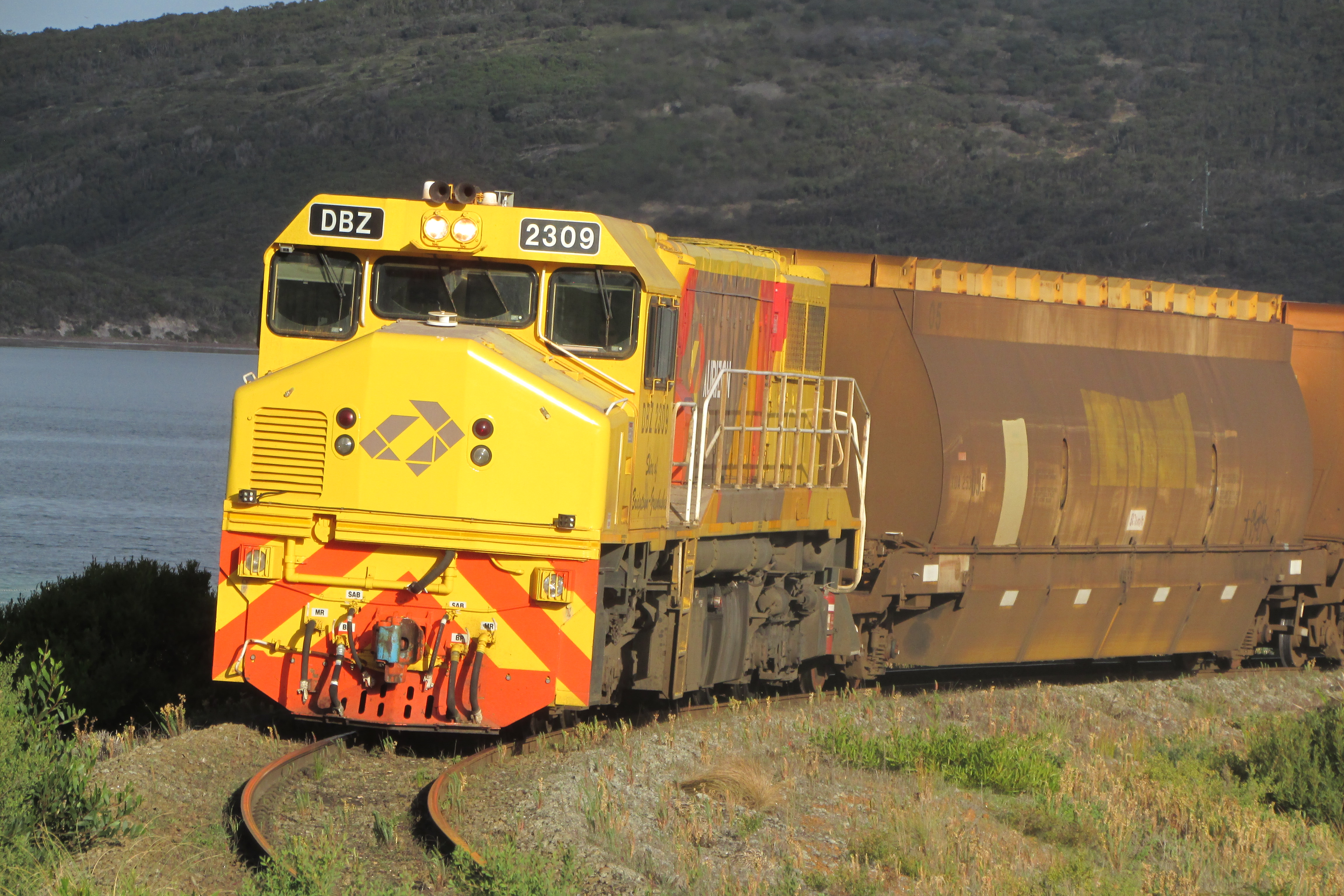
DBZ2309 at the Port of Albany with a woodchip train, 2017

In 1980, Westrail ordered ten DB Class locomotives from Clyde Engineering, Rosewater. Designated as the EMD G26CU-2, they were an evolution of the D and DA classes. The original order was extended to thirteen in October 1980. The class were fitted with a full-width cab, dual braking (air and vacuum) systems, a pressurised body to exclude dust and were the first Westrail locomotives to have air-conditioned cabs.

They were not owned by Westrail, but leverage leased from LVL Nominees, entering service between April 1982 and May 1983. All were named after cities and shires in South West Western Australia. Brass nameplates were originally fitted, but these were later replaced by painted names.

All were included in the sale of Westrail to Australian Railroad Group in December 2000, the State Government having bought out the leases shortly before. As part of a policy to drop letter classifications in favour of a numeric system based on horsepower, they became the 2300 Class. In May 2003, 2313 was transferred to Australian Southern Railroad's Whyalla operation, it returned in August 2006.

In June 2006, all were included in the sale of Australian Railroad Group's Western Australian operation to QR National. Between 2006 and 2012, all were equipped with ZTR engine control equipment. A change in policy saw letter classifications reintroduced, with the class again becoming the DB Class. Upon being fitted with ZTR equipment, they were reclassified as DBZs.

All remained in service at the beginning of 2013, however 12 months later this was down to five with the last two withdrawn in March 2014. By June 2014, seven had returned to service.

In December 2017, CBH Group purchased 10 units from Aurizon (DBZ2301-2308, 2312–2313) for use on their wheat train services, operated by Watco Australia at the time. These units were transferred to Beverley for further storage pending reactivation. By July 2019, three units, DBZ2301, 2302 and 2305, had entered service with their new owners.

In 2023, all CBH owned locomotives were stored pending shipping to South Africa before the sale fell through just two days before they were due to leave. One year later, Watco had purchased the units from CBH and have transferred them from Beverley to the Wheatbelt Heritage Rail Centre in Minnivale.

== Class list ==
Key:	In Service	Stored	Preserved	Converted	Under Overhaul	Scrapped

Serial number	Entered service	Original Road Number	Renumbered As	Name	Current/Last Owner	Status	Notes
81-989	Tuesday, 27 April 1982	DB1581	DBZ2301	City of Bunbury	Watco Australia	In Service	-
81-990	May 1982	DB1582	DBZ2302	Shire of Serpentine-Jarrahdale	Watco Australia	Stored (Minnivale)	-
81-991	June 1982	DB1583	DBZ2303	Shire of Murray	Watco Australia	Stored (Minnivale)	-
81-992	July 1982	DB1584	DBZ2304	Shire of Waroona	Watco Australia	Stored (Minnivale)	-
81-993	August 1982	DB1585	DBZ2305	Shire of Harvey	Watco Australia	In Service	-
81-994	September 1982	DB1586	DBZ2306	Shire of Dardanup	Watco Australia	Stored (Minnivale)	-
81-995	October 1982	DB1587	DBZ2307	Shire of Capel	Watco Australia	Stored (Minnivale)	-
81-996	November 1982	DB1588	DBZ2308	Shire of Donnybrook-Balingup	Watco Australia	Stored (Minnivale)	-
81-997	December 1982	DB1589	DBZ2309	Shire of Bridgetown-Greenbushes	Aurizon	Stored (Forrestfield)	-
81-998	February 1983	DB1590	DBZ2310	Shire of Collie	Aurizon	Scrapped July 2026 (C. D. Dodd Forrestfield)	Swapped names with DBZ2311 during overhaul.
82-1122	March 1983	DB1591	DBZ2311	Shire of Manjimup	Aurizon	Stored (Forrestfield)	Swapped names with DBZ2310 during overhaul.
82-1123	May 1983	DB1592	DBZ2312	Shire of Toodyay	Watco Australia	Stored (Minnivale)	-
82-1124	May 1983	DB1593	DBZ2313	Shire of Northam/Iron Duke/Shire of Dowerin	Watco Australia	Stored (Minnivale)	Transferred to Australian Southern Railroad, Whyalla in May 2003 and renamed "Iron Duke". Returned to Western Australia in August 2006 and renamed "Shire of Dowerin".
