= EMD GP8 =

EMD/Illinois Central GP8
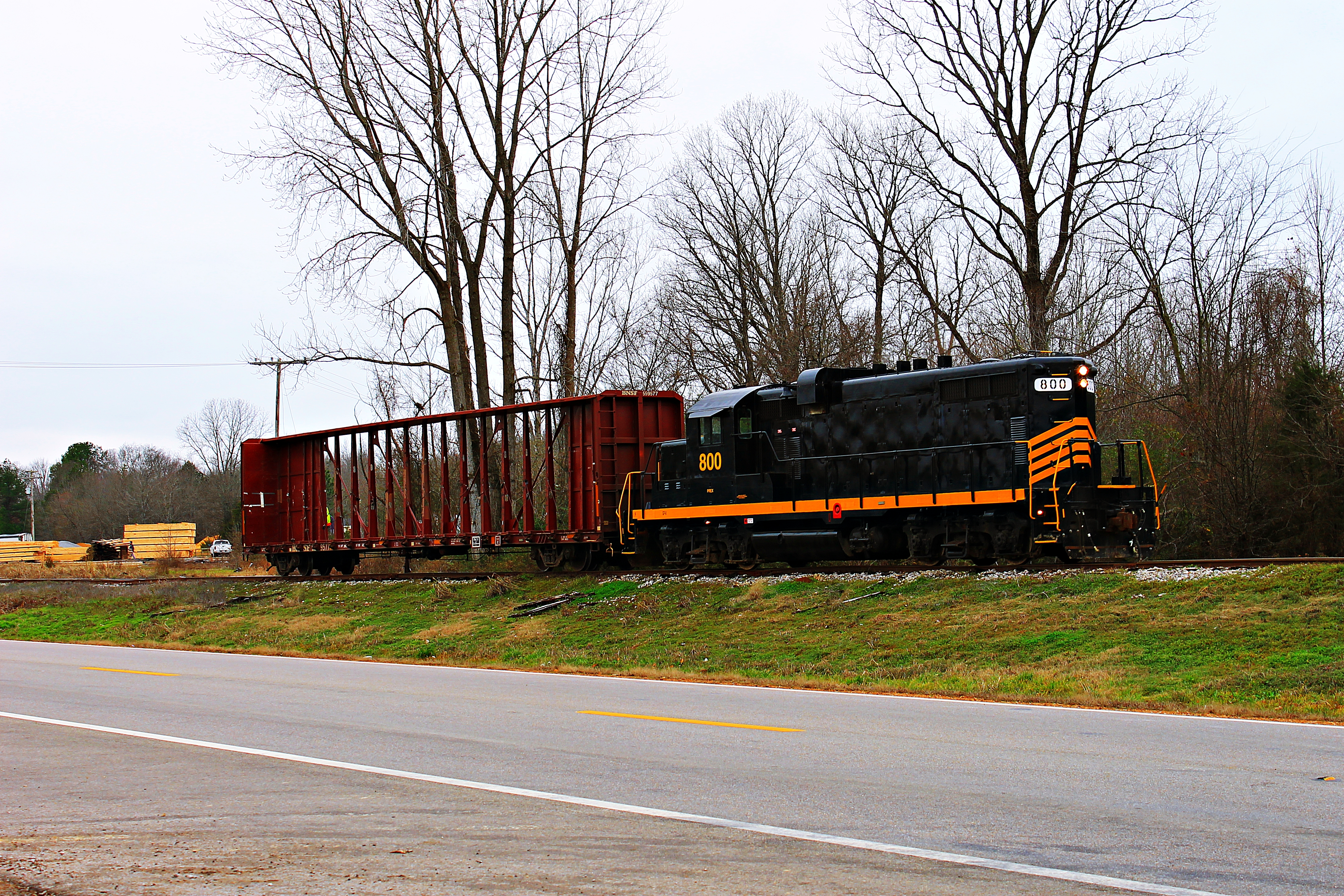
- A Ripley and New Albany Railroad GP8 in 2012.
Type and origin
- Power type: Diesel-electric
- Builder: General Motors Electro-Motive Division (EMD)
- Total produced: 111
- Rebuilder: Illinois Central Railroad’s Paducah, Kentucky shops
- Rebuild date: 1969 – 1978
Specifications
- Configuration
  - AAR: B-B
  - UIC: Bo'Bo'
- Gauge: 4 ft 8 1/2 in (1,435 mm)
- Length: 56 ft 2 in (17.12 m)
- Fuel capacity: 1,600 US gal (6,100 L; 1,300 imp gal)
- Lubricant cap.: 200 US gal (760 L; 170 imp gal)
- Coolant cap.: 230 US gal (870 L; 190 imp gal)
- Sandbox cap.: 18 cu ft (510 dm^{3})
- Prime mover: EMD 16-567BC
- Loco brake: Independent air
- Train brakes: Air, schedule 26-L
Performance figures
- Maximum speed: 65 mph (105 km/h)
- Power output: 1,500 or 1,600 hp (1.12 or 1.19 MW)
Career
- Operators: Illinois Central Railroad
- Disposition: Some still in service

The EMD GP8 is a model of four-axle diesel locomotive rebuilt by Illinois Central's Paducah shops using a General Motors Electro-Motive Division (EMD) GP7, GMD GP7 or GP9 as a start. It is similar to the GP10 and GP11.

== History ==
A total of 111 units were rebuilt to "GP8" for the Illinois Central and Illinois Central Gulf. Core units used in the construction of these units were Illinois Central GP7, GP9, a GP8, C&O GP9, D&RGW GP9, DT&I GP7, N&W GP7, P&LE GP7, QNS&L GP7, RDG GP7, St.J&LC GP9, SLSF GP7, and SP GP9.

The Paducah Shops also rebuilt 16 Conrail GP7s to GP8s. Nine were rebuilt in 1976 and another seven in 1978. Rock Island's Silvis Shops rebuilt 20 Conrail GP7s into GP8s in 1978. Morrison-Knudsen's Boise Shops rebuilt 13 Conrail GP7s into GP8s in 1978. The 1976 Conrail units rebuilt at Paducah were the equivalent of the Illinois Central rebuilds. The 1978 rebuilds were engine and electrical gear only rebuilds with no carbody modifications.

== Preservation ==
Two GP8s are preserved.

- BUGX #804 (formerly IC #7714, rebuilt from Norfolk and Western GP7 #3455) was donated to the Louisiana Steam Train Association (LASTA) in Jefferson, Louisiana by Rock Island Rail (RI) in 2025.
- Illinois Central Gulf 7738 (rebuilt from Reading GP7 #610) is operational at the Bluegrass Railroad Museum (BGRM) in Versailles, Kentucky, having been restored to its ICG colors.
