= Napa Valley Wine Train =

Privately operated excursion train that runs between Napa and St. Helena, California

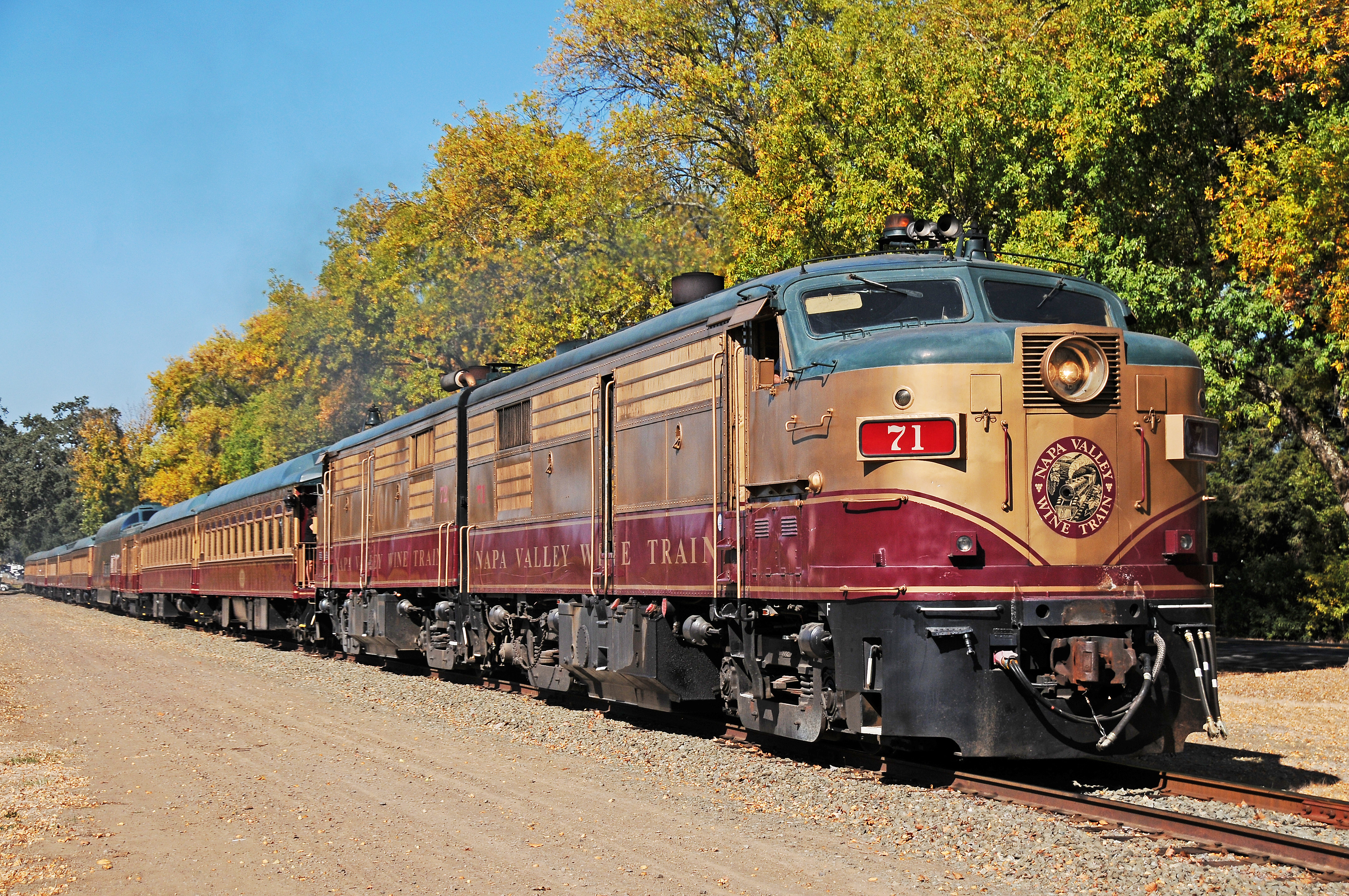
- Napa Valley Wine Train in 2013
- Locale: Napa County, California, USA
- Connections: Union Pacific Railroad and California Northern Railroad

Commercial operations
- Original gauge: 4 ft 8 1/2 in (1,435 mm) standard gauge

Preserved operations
- Operated by: Napa Valley Railroad
- Reporting mark: NVRR
- Stations: 4
- Length: 18.0 mi (29.0 km)
- Preserved gauge: 4 ft 8 1/2 in (1,435 mm) standard gauge

Preservation history
- Headquarters: Napa, California

Website
- http://www.winetrain.com

The Napa Valley Wine Train is a privately operated excursion train that runs between Napa and St. Helena, California. Much of the rail line parallels State Route 29 after leaving the City of Napa and passes the towns of Yountville, Rutherford and Oakville. The route passes by many of the region's vineyards and wineries located in Napa County. The Wine Train is operated by the Napa Valley Railroad (reporting mark NVRR).

== History ==
The NVRR operating company was formed in 1987 by local entrepreneurs and headed by Vincent DeDomenico. The NVRR acquired the right of way of the Napa Valley Railroad for $2.5 million after Southern Pacific notified the Interstate Commerce Commission of its intent to abandon the line in 1985.

The new company's plans to create a tourist-oriented Wine Train were strongly opposed by local community activists and several city governments. Some people disliked the noise and pollution of an active passenger train line in their midst, while others felt that the train would attract even more visitors to the Napa Valley, which they saw as already over-saturated with tourists. The project's opponents persuaded the state Public Utilities Commission (PUC) to order the company to comply with the rigorous requirements of the California Environmental Quality Act (CEQA). However, in a 4-3 decision handed down on March 19, 1990, the Supreme Court of California held that the PUC had no jurisdiction to require CEQA certification because the train fell under the CEQA exemption for "the institution or increase of passenger or commuter service on rail lines already in use."

The gap in actual usage during the prolonged transition from Southern Pacific freight use to the proposed Wine Train service was not enough to take the line out of use, although the many years of deferred maintenance necessitated the investment of approximately $20 million to rehabilitate the line before trains could be safely operated on it. The rail line connects to the Union Pacific Railroad and California Northern Railroad and has hosted special trains from Amtrak as well as private excursion trains.

In June 2009, the St. Helena City Council voted to allow the Wine Train passengers to disembark in St. Helena on a trial basis on the first Friday of the month (May–October). Following the death of Vincent DeDomenico in October 2007, DeDomenico family members chose son-in-law Gregory McManus to step into the position of CEO. The DeDomenico family sold the Napa Valley Wine Train to Noble House Hotels & Resorts in partnership with Brooks Street in 2015. In 2017, Noble House Hotels & Resorts announced plans to build a 5-story, 148 room hotel on the railroad's property on McKinstry Street in downtown Napa.

=== 2015 controversy ===
On August 22, 2015, an 11-member book club group was removed from the train for laughing too loudly. The book club, Sisters on the Reading Edge, consisted of ten African-American women and one white woman, their ages ranging from 39 to 85. A reporter on the train expressed dismay that they were removed, and book club members described the experience as "humiliating".

A post from Napa Valley Wine Train on their Facebook page accused the group of "physical and verbal abuse towards other guests and staff." The post was subsequently removed. Two days later, Napa Valley Wine Train hired crisis communications expert Sam Singer to apologize for both the incident and the Facebook post which he described as "incorrect".

After the story was picked up by the local and national press, the Twitter hashtag #laughingwhileblack was used to express concern about racial bias, white privilege, and the actions of the wine train staff. Fallout from the incident caused two book club members to lose their jobs. The book club filed a lawsuit seeking $11 million in damages, and after private mediation, reached a settlement in April 2016 for an undisclosed sum.

== Operations ==
The original train has a capacity of 320 passengers and typically makes two runs a day. The train is normally pulled by two of the four late-1950s era Alco FPA-4 engines in the company's inventory. These engines were originally built by Montreal Locomotive Works and first owned by Canadian National Railway and later by Via Rail. Two of the engines were modified by the railroad to run cleaner on a combination of natural gas and diesel fuel. One was dual fuel (NVR 70), and the other was 100% CNG (Compressed Natural Gas) (NVR 73). Presently, #70 has been converted back to 100% diesel, while the #73 remains 100% CNG.

The company announced in February 2018 that it would be leasing 5 passenger cars, a locomotive and power car from the Sierra Railroad Company while renovating the interior and exteriors of several cars in its fleet.

=== Equipment ===
The Napa Valley Wine Train currently runs nine cars on its passenger train consisting of lounge, observation and dining cars originally built by the Pullman Company in the early 1900s for the Northern Pacific Railroad. These cars were later sold to Denver and Rio Grande Western Railroad in 1960 and used for the Ski Train between Denver, Colorado and Winter Park, Colorado before the NVRR purchased them in 1987. The cars were extensively refurbished and modified by NVRR before the railroad placed them back into service. Modifications included adding air conditioning and 4 inches of concrete to the car floors in order to stabilize the ride due to the train's low speed. The interiors were remodeled using Honduran mahogany and plush fabrics. The railroad added a Super Dome car to its fleet in 1997. This car was originally built in 1952 for the Chicago, Milwaukee, St. Paul and Pacific Railroad and had logged more than a million miles for that railroad prior to being acquired by the NVRR. After the railroad bought this car, the exterior was rebuilt by the Ringling Bros. and Barnum & Bailey Circus train repair yard in Palmetto, Florida while the interior was restored, updated, and customized by NVRR.

A modified box car containing a 400KVA generator was added to the consist in 2013 in order to maintain constant power to the train during the time that the locomotives are run around to the south end of the train, for the return trip from St. Helena. The generator was placed inside a sound proof room with a passageway for passengers on the opposite side. During the modification process, the roof of this car was lowered by two feet in order to preserve the view from the dome car and weight was added to the side of the car opposite from the generator in order to balance the load.

=== Locomotives ===
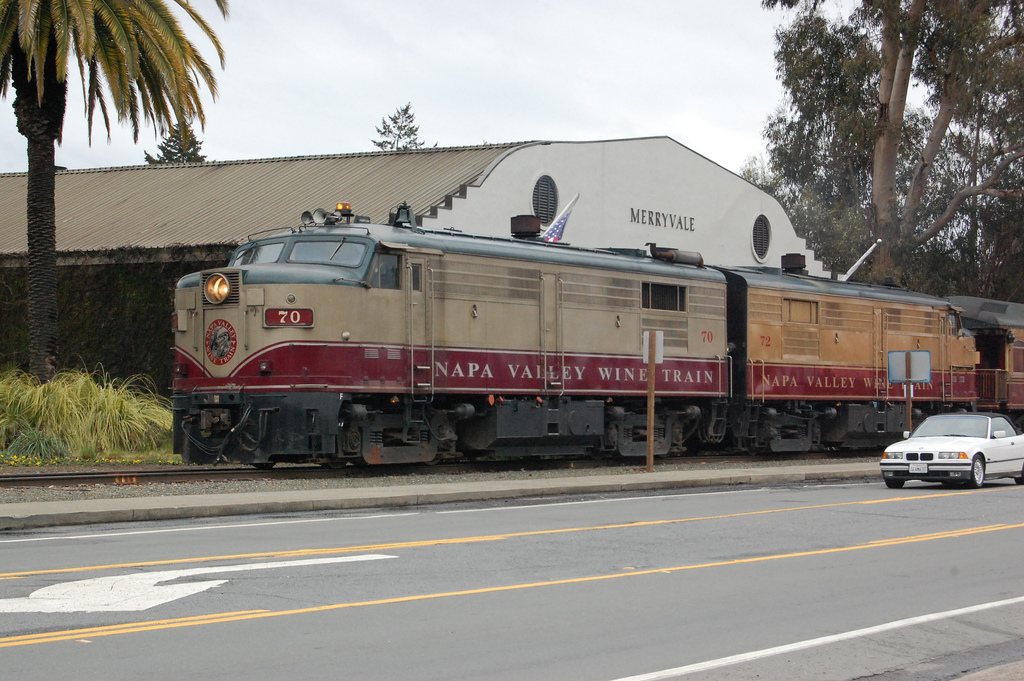
NVRR Diesel locomotives #70 & #72

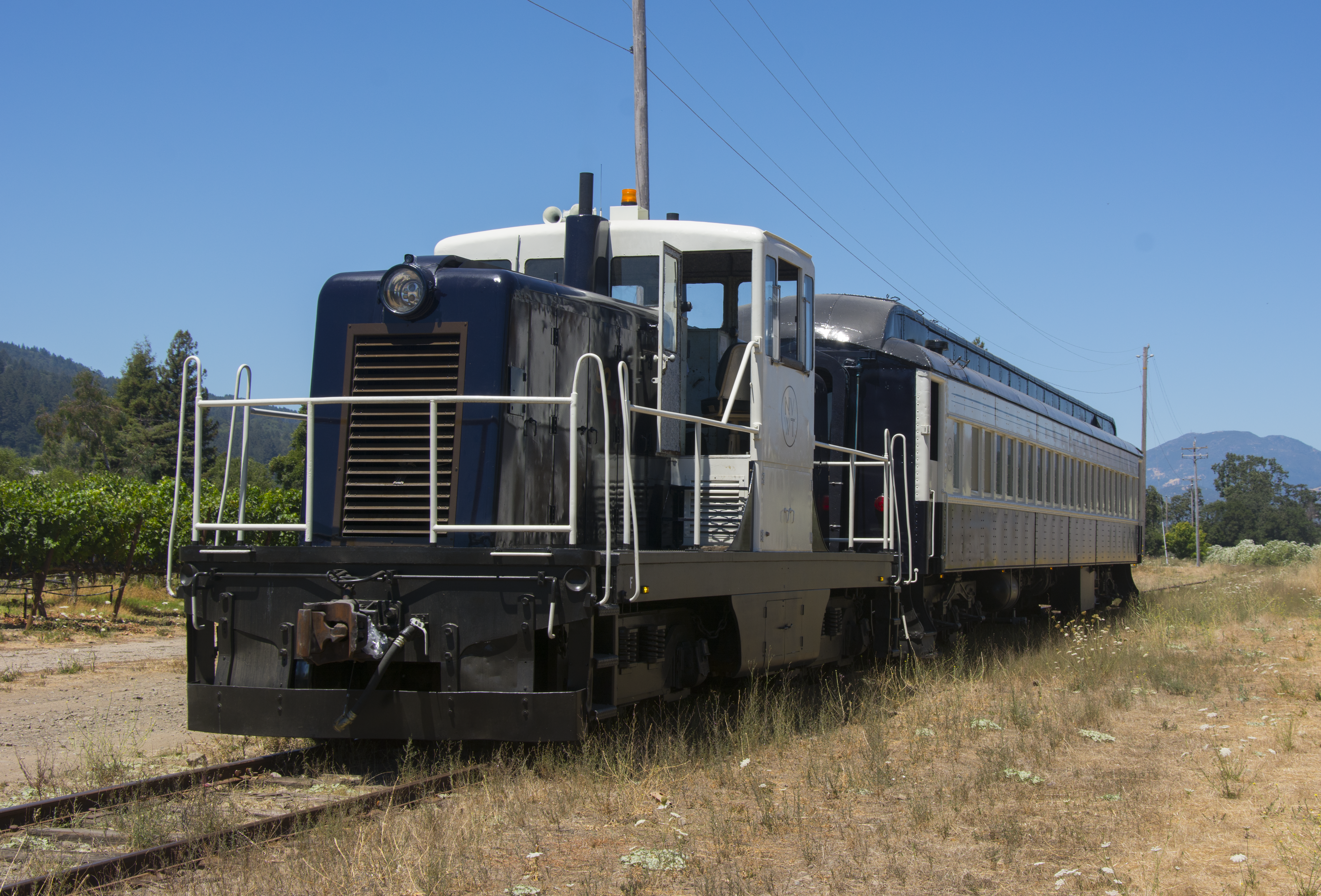
The Quattro Vino, a train to four wineries introduced in 2016

As of 2024, the locomotive fleet consists of the following:

Number	Builder / Model	Date	Builder Number	Notes
52	GE /65-ton switcher	July 1943	17871	nee US Army 7888
57	GE 80-ton switcher	August 1952	31357	nee US Army 1650
62	ALCO RS-11	1959	83416	Bought from California Western Railroad-1989 Originally SP 5854
69	EMD Rebuilt GP9R	October 1958	24765	Formerly Portland and Western 1804. Entered into revenue service on November 2. 2016 Originally M&StL 710
70	Alco MLW/FPA-4	October 1958	82269	ex VIA/CN 6760
71	Alco MLW/FPA-4	February 1959	83153	ex VIA/CN 6775. Withdrawn as of 2023 with prime mover scrapped.
72	Alco MLW/FPA-4	April 1959	83165	ex VIA/CN 6787
73	Alco MLW/FPA-4	April 1959	83168	ex VIA/CN 6790 Rebuilt to burn natural gas & has an EMD 12-645E prime mover.
1864	KLW NZE15B	2023	N/A	Rebuilt from NRE 3GS21B. Slated to replace current fleet.

There is also one locomotive on lease from outside owners: #5076.

As of October 2023, the Napa Valley Wine Train plans to replace its current locomotive fleet with two Tier 4 locomotives built by Knoxville Locomotive Works. The first of these entered service in November 2023.

== Plans ==
The NVRR track is currently used for limited daily scheduled passenger excursions of the Napa Valley Wine Train and occasional freight service. A July 2003 study examined the feasibility of acquiring right of way between St. Helena and Calistoga and adding commuter service on the route. This study included consideration for connecting with other mass transit services beyond the Napa Valley and increasing freight service.

Developers of the proposed 3,200-unit townhome Napa Pipe project have proposed a private venture shuttle service that would use a portion of the NVRR line from the southern terminus of the line north to Redwood Road and Trancas Street. The proposed shuttle would continue south on Union Pacific Railroad-owned right of way to American Canyon, with trains leaving every 20 or 30 minutes. The developers have held preliminary discussions with NVRR as well as Union Pacific. Backers of the proposal to add commuter service released a business plan in early 2012 revealing that the service would need to carry 1 to 1.5 million passengers per year in order to achieve a profit. Members of the Napa County Transportation and Planning Agency have expressed some initial interest in the proposal.

== See also ==
- List of California railroads
- List of heritage railroads in the United States
- List of heritage railways
- List of San Francisco Bay Area trains
