= MGWR Class D-bogie =

Class of Irish locomotives

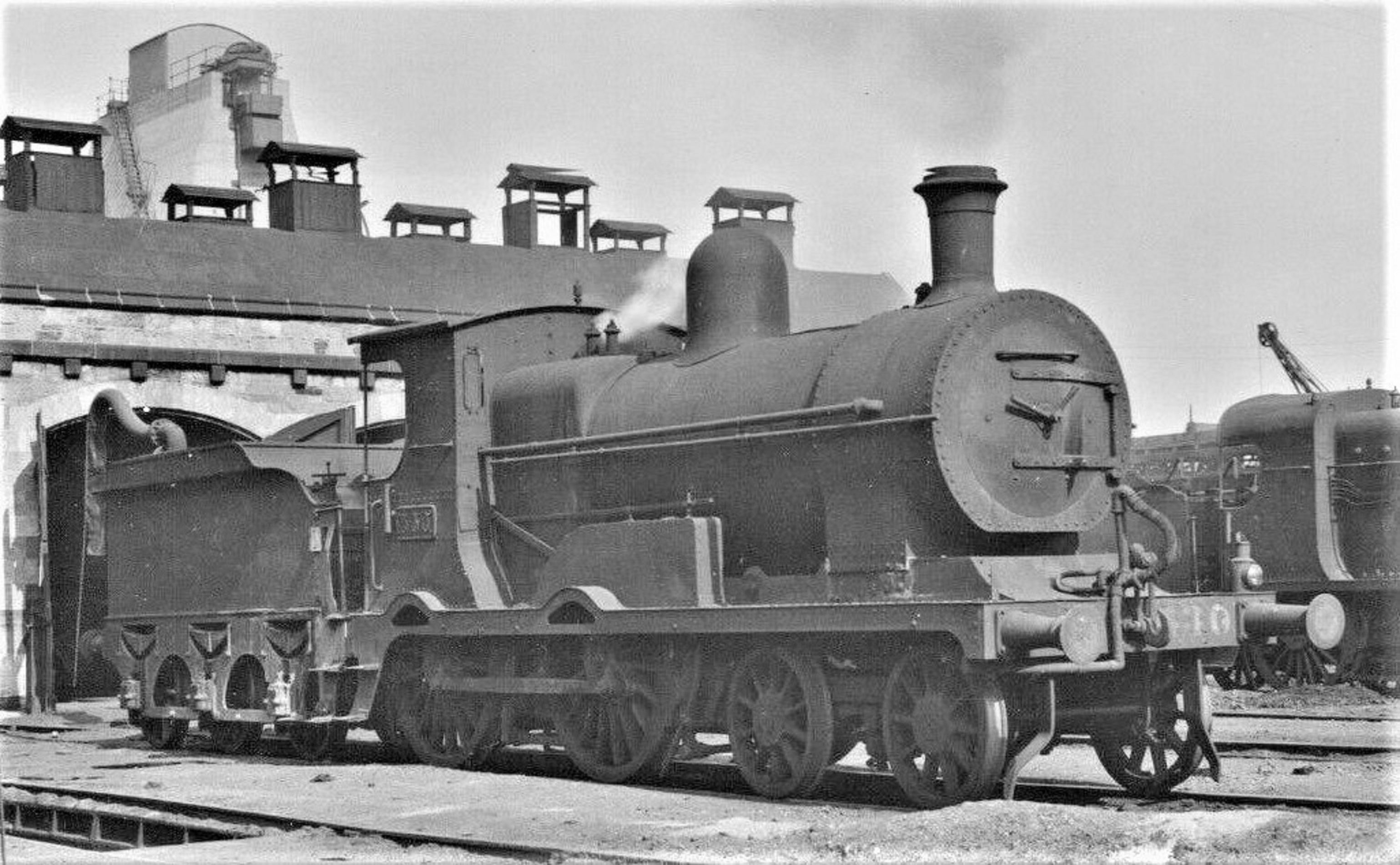
Type and origin
- Power type: Steam
- Builder: Beyer, Peacock & Company
- Order number: 3924
- Serial number: 1960–1965
- Build date: 1880–1881
- Total produced: 6
- Rebuild date: 1900–1901
- Number rebuilt: 6
Specifications
- Configuration
  - Whyte: 2-4-0, rebuilt to 4-4-0
  - UIC: 1B, rebuilt 2′B
- Gauge: 5 ft 3 in (1,600 mm)
Career
- Operators: MGWR → GSR → CIÉ
- Class: MGWR: D GSR/CIÉ: 530 or D16
- Numbers: MGWR: 2–3, 25–26, 36–37; GSR: 530–535
- Nicknames: Achill Bogies
- Withdrawn: 1945–1953

The MGWR Class D-bogie were first 4-4-0 operated by the Midland Great Western Railway (MGWR) of Ireland. They were rebuilt from MGWR Class D 2-4-0 locomotives in 1900/01 with the intention to use them on the Dublin to Sligo mainline but they proved underpowered for this work and were allocated to more suitable work around County Mayo, including Achill. This led to their nicknames of Mayo Bogies or Achill Bogies. Following the merger of the MGWR into Great Southern Railways (GSR) they also became designated class 530 or D16.

== Locomotives ==
MGWR No.	Name	Introduced	D-bogie	GSR No.	Withdrawn
2	Jupiter	1880	1900	534	1949
3	Juno	1880	1901	535	1949
25→4	Cyclops	1880	1901	531	1945
26→5	Britania	1880	1900	532	1949
36→1	Empress of Austria	1881	1900	530	1949
37→35→6	Wolfdog	1881	1900	533	1953

== Design and historical development ==
The 39 MGWR Class D locomotives were originally built as 2-4-0s between 1873 and 1887 by five different manufactures. A batch of six in 1880/81 were built by Beyer, Peacock & Company, Manchester and these were destined to be rebuilt as 4-4-0s. The reason for subcontracting this batch was that Broadstone Works was working to capacity at the time.

In 1900/01, and being impressed with the bogie engines introduced by the Great Southern & Western Railway, the Chief Mechanical Engineer of the MGWR, Martin Atock, decided on a similar experiment. Six of the 2-4-0s were converted to 4-4-0s, and redesignated D-bogie class. They were originally planned for use on the Mullingar to Sligo mail trains, however they were poor steamers and proved to be underpowered for this work being transferred soon afterwards to the Westport – Achill branch line in western County Mayo — a highly scenic line which passed through the small town of Newport and the village of Mallaranny before reaching the western seaboard at Achill Sound.

The six locomotives converted were the Beyer, Peacock models, Nos. 2, 3, 25, 26, 36 and 37. These locomotives became such regular performers on this line that they were nicknamed the "Achill Bogies". Following the absorption of the MGWR into the Great Southern Railways in 1925, they were renumbered 534, 535, 531, 532, 530 and 533, in the same order as the original numbers shown above. The first four dated from 1880, in their original form, and the last two 1881. It was the intention that these conversions would replace the Class K, 2-4-0 locomotives but with their steaming problems the Ks were still in service long after the last D had been relegated to minor duties or even the scrapheap. Following the closure of the Achill line in 1937, there was little work for them to do, but one served on the Claremorris to Ballina branch for a time, another was occasionally used between Portarlington and Athlone and a third member of the class ended its days as a stationary boiler at Broadstone depot. The others seem to have found their way by degrees to Athlone and Broadstone. The 531 was withdrawn in 1945, all the rest apart from 533 in 1949, and 533 itself managed to survive until 1953, though it lay out of use for much of this time.

== Livery ==
Redesignated as the Class 530 or Class D16 by the Great Southern Railways, and repainted overall dull battleship grey instead of the lined green livery they carried in MGWR days, they served the Achill line reliably to the last.
