= Knoxville Locomotive Works =

Manufacturer of railway locomotives

Overview
- Parent company: Gulf & Ohio Railways
- Headquarters: Knoxville, Tennessee
- Reporting mark: KLWX
- Locale: Tennessee
- Dates of operation: 1998–present

Technical
- Track gauge: 4 ft 8 1/2 in (1,435 mm) (standard gauge)

Other
- Website: www.goklw.com

Knoxville Locomotive Works (reporting mark KLWX) is an affiliate of Gulf & Ohio Railways headquartered in Knoxville, Tennessee. Since its establishment in 1998, Knoxville Locomotive Works (KLW) has repowered, refurbished, remanufactured, and/or upgraded over 400 locomotives. Today, KLW offers its own line of green, single-engine, repowered locomotives from 1,000 hp four axle switchers up to 3,200 hp six axle line haul locomotives.

In addition to green locomotives, KLW also offers conventional services, such as locomotive rebuilding and refurbishment services for traditional locomotives. KLW has a field services branch with four service regions (Northeast, Southeast, Midwest, West Coast), and a locomotive leasing and sales division.

== Model information ==
Model designation	Build year	Total produced	AAR wheel arrangement	Prime mover	Power output	Image
SE10B	2015-Present	11	B-B	MTU Series 2000 12V	1,050 hp (0.78 MW)	
SE15B	2016-Present	10	B-B	MTU Series 2000 16V	1,560 hp (1.16 MW)	
SE20B	2014-Present	1 (Demonstrator)	B-B	MTU Series 4000 12V	2,250 hp (1.68 MW)	
SE24B	2018-Present	9	B-B	MTU Series 4000 12V R54	2,400 hp (1.79 MW)	
SE24C	2018-Present	1	C-C	MTU Series 4000 12V R54	2,400 hp (1.79 MW)	
SE32C	2014-Present	2	C-C	MTU Series 4000 16V R54	3,200 hp (2.39 MW)	
Q19-2.4GH	2025-present	1 (Note: Battery-diesel hybrid locomotive rebuilt from an ex-BNSF NRE 3GS21B locomotive for use on the Canadian National Railway.)	B-B		3,200 hp (2.39 MW)	
