= BHP Port Kembla D35 class =

Australian diesel locomotives

Type and origin
- Power type: Diesel-electric
- Builder: English Electric, Rocklea
- Build date: 1971-75
- Total produced: 11
Specifications
- Configuration
  - UIC: Bo-Bo
- Gauge: 1,435 mm (4 ft 8 1/2 in) standard gauge
- Length: 42 ft (12.80 m)
- Axle load: 22 long tons (22.4 t; 24.6 short tons)
- Loco weight: 88 long tons (89.4 t; 98.6 short tons)
- Fuel type: Diesel
- Prime mover: English Electric 6CSRKT Mk II
- RPM range: 450 - 850
- Engine type: Four stroke, 6 Inline, four valves per cylinder
- Aspiration: Turbocharged, intercooled
- Generator: English Electric 827
- Cylinders: 6
- Cylinder size: 10 in × 12 in (254 mm × 305 mm)
- Loco brake: Air, Dynamic
- Train brakes: Air
Performance figures
- Power output: 1,012 hp (755 kW) gross, 928 hp (692 kW) net
Career
- Operators: Australian Iron & Steel
- Number in class: 11
- Numbers: D35-D45
- First run: 1971
- Current owner: Pacific National
- Disposition: all scrapped

The D35 class are a class of diesel locomotives built by English Electric, Rocklea for Australian Iron & Steel's, Port Kembla steelworks between 1971 and 1975.

== History ==
The D35 class were purchased to haul trains on Australian Iron & Steel's, Port Kembla network. They were used on coal trains from Kemira, Nebo and Wongawilli collieries as well as steel mill services. A downturn in the late 1970s saw six leased to the Public Transport Commission where as well as operating services in the Illawarra region, they operated as far as Bombo and Sydney.

All except previously scrapped D35 and D37 passed to Pacific National in August 2007 when BlueScope outsourced the operation of its rail network. D36, D38, D39 and D40-D45 were scrapped in 2018. D40 remains in service as a standby unit as of February 2021.
