= BHP Port Kembla D16 class =

Class of Australian diesel locomotives

BHP Port Kembla D16 Locomotive
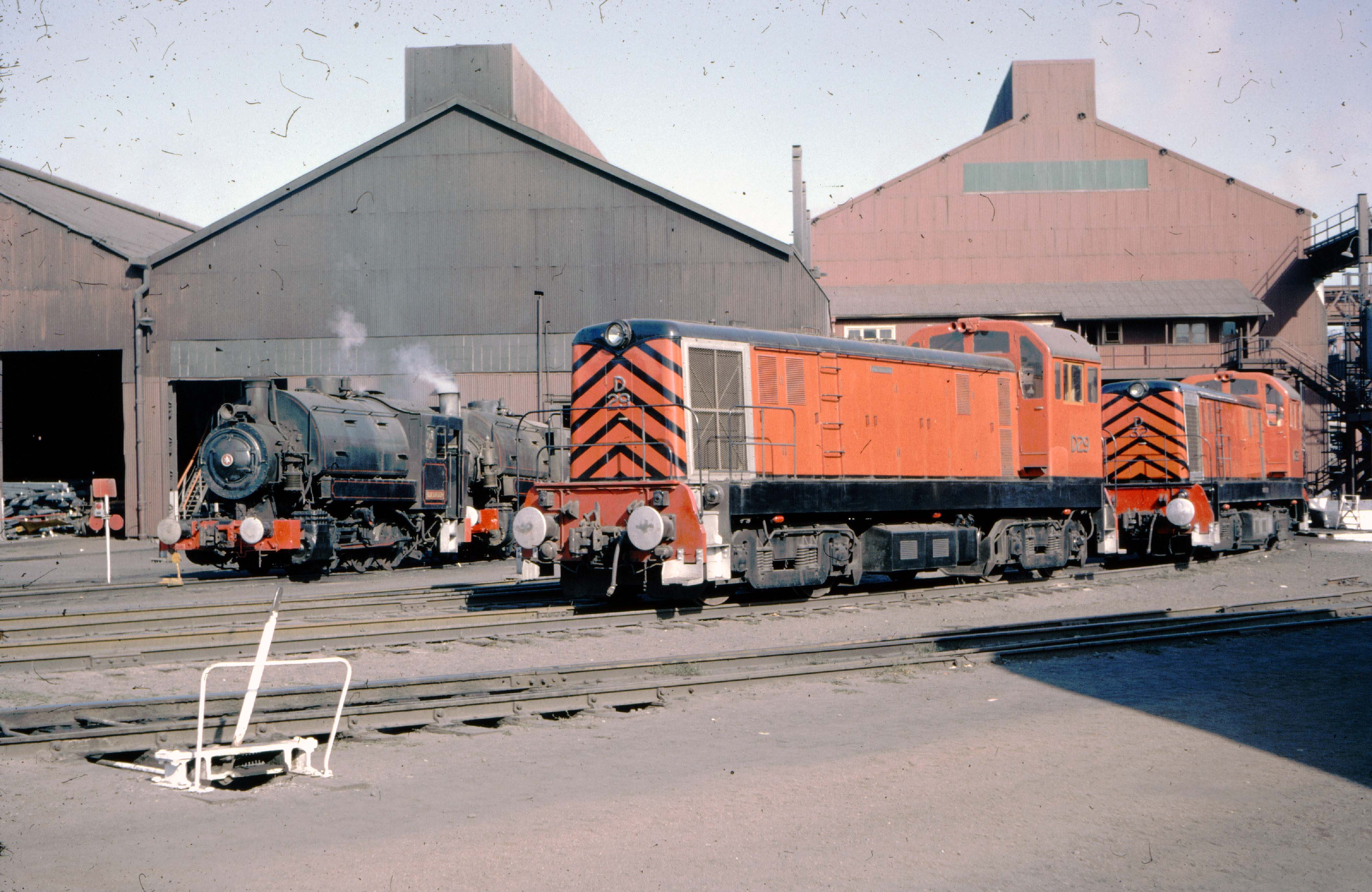
- D29 and D32 at Australian Iron and Steel Works, Port Kembla, 1965.
Type and origin
- Power type: Diesel-electric
- Builder: English Electric, Rocklea
- Build date: 1959-64
- Total produced: 12
Specifications
- Configuration
  - UIC: Bo-Bo
- Gauge: 1,435 mm (4 ft 8 1/2 in) standard gauge
- Length: 12.5 m (41 ft 1/8 in)
- Loco weight: 93 t (92 long tons; 103 short tons)
- Fuel type: Diesel
- Prime mover: English Electric 8SRKT Mk II
Performance figures
- Power output: 589 kW (790 hp)
Career
- Operators: Australian Iron & Steel
- Number in class: 12
- Numbers: D16-D19, D26-D33
- First run: December 1959
- Current owner: Pacific National
- Disposition: all scrapped

The D16 class are a class of diesel locomotives built by English Electric, Rocklea for Australian Iron & Steel's, Port Kembla steelworks between 1959 and 1964.

== History ==
D16 was one of the fleet of Locomotives that was built with more engine power than D1 class with 12 delivered in 3 orders, D16 to D19, D26 to D29 & D30 to D33 between 1959 and 1964 to haul trains on Australian Iron & Steel's, Port Kembla network.

All were leased to Pacific National in August 2007 when BlueScope outsourced the operation of its rail network. The locomotives remained the property of BlueScope Steel.
