= National Railway Equipment =

American railroad equipment company

National Railway Equipment, Co.
- Company type: Private
- Industry: Railroad
- Founded: 1984
- Headquarters: Mt. Vernon, Illinois, United States
- Products: Low emission diesel locomotives, Locomotive maintenance & rebuilding
- Website: www.nre.com

National Railway Equipment Company (reporting mark NREX) is an American railroad equipment rebuilding, leasing, and manufacturing company, headquartered in Mt. Vernon, Illinois. NREC sells new and rebuilt locomotives to railroad companies worldwide, with an emphasis on the North American market.

== N-ViroMotive Series ==
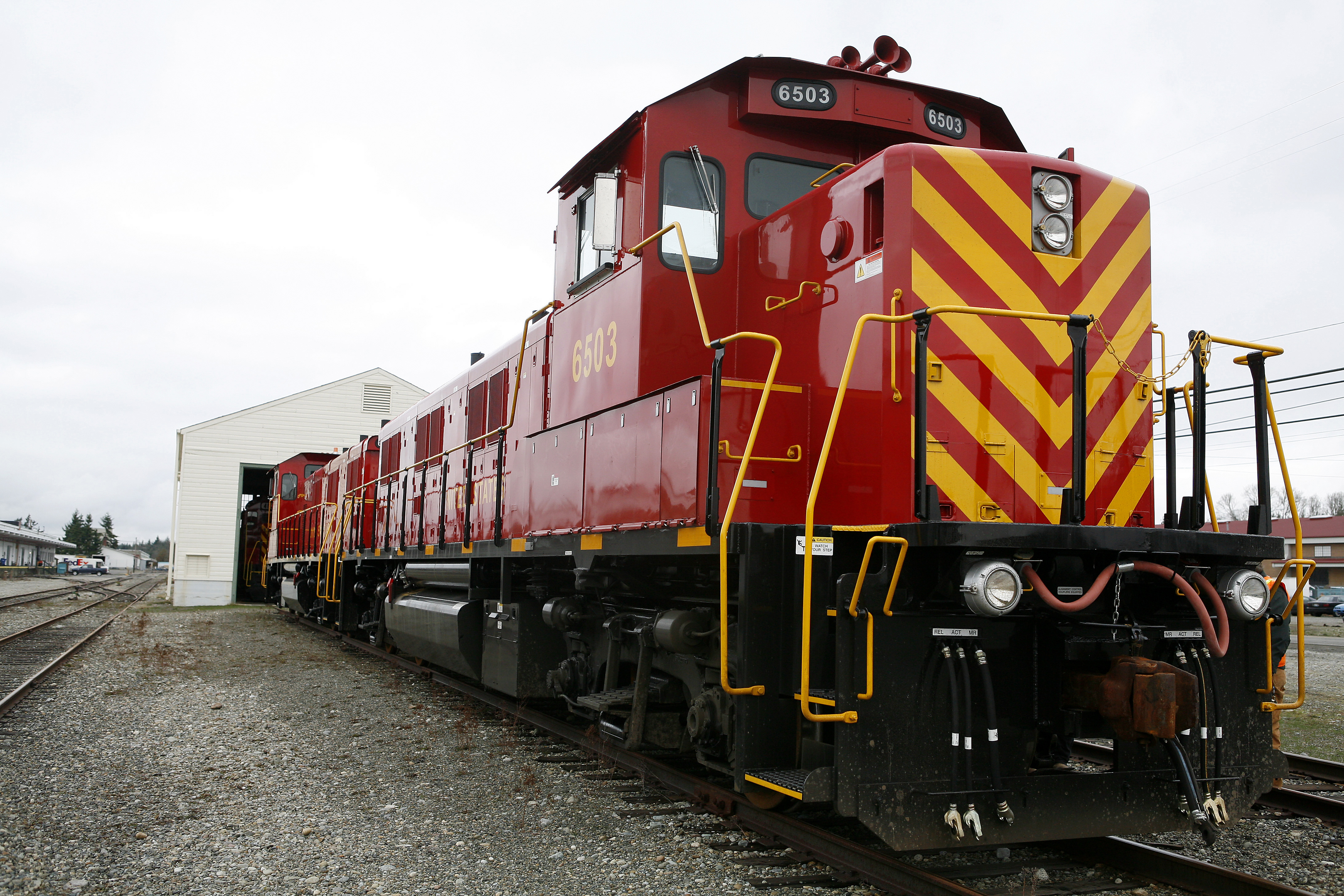
New NRE 3GS21B locomotives were delivered to the U.S. Army.

NRE's flagship locomotive product is dubbed the N-ViroMotive and is targeted at providing light duty road switcher engines with increased efficiency and decreased air and noise pollution. These locomotives are specifically targeted for yards and other urban environments where noise & exhaust from idling locomotives can become a nuisance. They also fill a market segment for light duty locomotives now largely abandoned by the major builders, GE & Electro-Motive, which have not listed such locomotives in their catalog for nearly 20 years.

N-ViroMotives are newly built as opposed to rebuilt with donor parts. They use a low hood design with up to three diesel generator sets (gensets) that supply power to the traction motors. The current gensets use a 700 horsepower (522 kW) Cummins diesel engine and can be easily swapped in and out for repair or overhaul work. The gensets are computer-controlled to switch on and off according to the demands of hauling the load. Trucks are of the EMD standard Blomberg B design.

As of 2009, NREC has sold upwards of 210 N-ViroMotives to many different railroads, including the U.S. Army, with the largest order of 60 being delivered to the Union Pacific which plans to use them in the smog conscious L.A. area.

== Model Information ==
| Model designation | Build year | Total produced | AAR wheel arrangement | Prime mover | Power output | Image | Notes |
N-ViroMotive Series Genset Locomotives
| 1GS7B | 2008–Present | 7 | B-B | Cummins QSK19C | 700 hp (0.52 MW) | | |
| 2GS14B | 2005–Present | 10 | B-B | Cummins QSK19C(×2) | 1,400 hp (1.04 MW) | | |
| 3GS21B | 2006–Present | 181 | B-B | Cummins QSK19C(×3) | 2,100 hp (1.57 MW) | | |
| 3GS21C | 2008–Present | 27 | C-C | Cummins QSK19C(×3) | 2,100 hp (1.57 MW) | | |
| 2GS36C-DE | 2011–Present | 1 | C-C | Cummins QSK50L(×2) | 3,600 hp (2.68 MW) | | |
| 2GS12B | 2014–Present | 4 | B-B | Cummins QSK15(×2) | 1,200 hp (0.89 MW) | | |
Narrow Gauge Locomotives
| E3000CC-DC | 2019–2020 | 6 | C-C (narrow gauge) | EMD 16-645 | 3,300 hp (2.46 MW) | | 4 were converted from new-build E-3000E3B prior to delivery |

== Export ==
| Destination | Model designation | Build year | Total produced | AAR wheel arrangement | Prime mover | Power output | Image | Notes |
|---|---|---|---|---|---|---|---|---|
| Argentina | E-2300 | 2008 | 2 | Co-Co | EMD 12-645E3B | 2,300 hp (1.72 MW) | | |
| Australia | E-3000E3B | 2012–Present | 8 (12) | Co-Co | EMD 16-645E3C | 3,300 hp (2.46 MW) | | 12 ordered and built but only 8 delivered; remaining 4 modified to narrow-gauge E3000CC-DC for WP&Y |
| Australia | AT36-C | 2005-2010 | 9 | Co-Co | EMD 16-645F3B | 3,800 hp (2.83 MW) | | Project taken over from Morrison-Knudsen. Manufactured in Australia. |
| Australia | 3GS24C-DE-AU | 2013–Present | 2 | C-C | Cummins QSK19C (×3) | 2,400 hp (1.79 MW) | | Demonstrator units owned by NREC. |
| Australia | 2GS16B-AU | mid-2014 | 7 | B-B | Cummins QSK19C (×2) | 1,600 hp (1.19 MW) | | |
| Brazil | E-3000C | 2007 | 2 | Co-Co | EMD 16-645E3C | 3,300 hp (2.46 MW) | | |
| Cameroon | E3000C-UN | 2009 | 2 | Co-Co | EMD 16-645E3C | 3,300 hp (2.46 MW) | | |
| Ivory Coast | NRE GT26 | 2015 | 6 | Co-Co | | | | |

== See also ==
- List of low emissions locomotives
