= List of low-emissions locomotives in North America =

The following is a list of diesel-electric locomotives that meet or exceed EPA Tier 2 locomotive emissions regulations, sorted by builder. This is a non-exhaustive list of locomotives in North America. Furthermore, green/clean energy is an always developing sector and that more locomotives may be added to the list, while some will no longer meet current standards.

== Altoona Works ==
Model designation	Wheel arrangement	Build year	Total produced	Power output	# of engines	Engine type	Image
BP4	B-B	2009	1	1,500 horsepower (1,120 kW)	0	1080 12-volt rechargeable batteries	
GP33ECO	B-B	2015–present	19	3,000 horsepower (2,240 kW)	1	EMD 12N-710G3B-T3 ECO	

== Brandt Road-Rail ==
Brandt Road-Rail is a company that mainly produces road–rail vehicles, especially railcar movers and maintenance of way equipment.

In addition, in 2006, it also built a single prototype genset locomotive.

Model designation	Wheel arrangement	Build year	Total produced	Power output	# of engines	Engine type	Image
Prototype	B-B	2006	1 (prototype)	1,800 horsepower (1,340 kW)	3	John Deere 6135H (I6)	See here

== Brookville Equipment ==
Model designation	Wheel arrangement	Build year	Total produced	Power output	# of engines	Engine type	Image
BL12CG	B-B	2015–present	2	1,200 horsepower (895 kW)	2	Cummins	
BL14CG	B-B	2008–present	2	1,400 horsepower (1,040 kW)	2	Cummins QSK-19 (I6)	
BL20CG	B-B	2007–present	1	2,100 horsepower (1,570 kW)	3	Cummins QSK-19 (I6)	
BL20G	B-B	2008–present		2,000 horsepower (1,490 kW)	1	MTU-Detroit Diesel 12V4000 (V12)	
BL20GH	B-B	2008–present	12	2,000 horsepower (1,490 kW)	1 (plus HEP engine)	MTU-Detroit Diesel 12V4000 (V12) and Caterpillar C15 (I6) (HEP)	
BL36PH	B-B	2012	12	3,619 horsepower (2,700 kW)	1 (plus HEP engine)	MTU 20V4000 (V20)	

== Electro-Motive Diesel ==
Model designation	Wheel arrangement	Build year	Total produced	Power output	# of engines	Engine type	Image
F125	B-B	2015–2021	40	4,700 horsepower (3,500 kW)	1	Caterpillar C175-20 (V20)	
GP15D	B-B	2000	10	1,500 horsepower (1,120 kW)	1	Caterpillar 3512 (V12) (EMD 12-170B15-T2)	
GP20D	B-B	2000	40	2,000 horsepower (1,490 kW)	1	Caterpillar 3516 (V16) (EMD 16-170B20-T2)	
GP22ECO	B-B	2009		2,150 horsepower (1,600 kW)	1	EMD 8–710G3A–T2	
SD22ECO	C-C	2009		2,150 horsepower (1,600 kW)	1	EMD 8–710G3A–T2	
SD32ECO	C-C	2009		3,150 horsepower (2,350 kW)	1	EMD 12–710G3B–T2	
SD70ACe	C-C	2004–2014	1,034	4,300 horsepower (3,210 kW)	1	EMD 16-710G3C-T2 (V16)	
SD70M-2	C-C	2005–2010	331	4,300 horsepower (3,210 kW)	1	EMD 16-710G3C-T2 (V16)	
SD70ACe-T4	C-C	2015–present		4,600 horsepower (3,430 kW)	1	EMD 12-1010J3 (V12)	

== GE Transportation ==
Model designation	Wheel arrangement	Build year	Total produced	Power output	# of engines	Engine type	Image
ES40DC	C-C	2004–2007		4,000 horsepower (2,980 kW)	1	GE GEVO-12 (V12)	
ES44AC	C-C	2003–2014		4,400 horsepower (3,280 kW)	1	GE GEVO-12 (V12)	
ES44C4	A1A-A1A	2009–2014		4,400 horsepower (3,280 kW)	1	GE GEVO-12 (V12)	
ES44DC	C-C	2004–2010		4,400 horsepower (3,280 kW)	1	GE GEVO-12 (V12)	
ET44AC	C-C	2015–present		4,400 horsepower (3,280 kW)	1	GE GEVO-12 (V12)	
ET44C4	A1A-A1A	2015–present		4,400 horsepower (3,280 kW)	1	GE GEVO-12 (V12)	

== Integral dx ==
Integral dx, Inc. is a company in Montevideo, Minnesota that builds a variety of industrial equipment, including spray pavers, concrete mixers, and railroad vehicles. Since 2023, it has been manufacturing Tier 4-compliant switchers for the US Armed Forces. These switchers are usually powered with Caterpillar engines, though Cummins-equipped variants are also offered.

Model designation	Wheel arrangement	Build year	Total produced	Power output	# of engines	Engine type	Image
SWM9	B-B	2024-present	Several for the US Navy	900 horsepower (671 kW)	Caterpillar C9.3B	2	
SWR10	B-B	Offered		1,000 horsepower (746 kW)	Caterpillar C13B	2	
SWF10	B-B	Offered		1,000 horsepower (746 kW)	Caterpillar C13B	2	
SWR16	B-B	Offered		1,600 horsepower (1,190 kW)	Caterpillar C18	2	
SWF16	B-B	Offered		1,600 horsepower (1,190 kW)	Caterpillar C18	2	
SWR18	B-B	2025-present	At least one for the US Air Force	1,800 horsepower (1,340 kW)	Caterpillar C27	2	
SWF18	B-B	Offered		1,800 horsepower (1,340 kW)	Caterpillar C27	2	
SWR21	B-B	Offered		1,800 horsepower (1,340 kW)	Caterpillar C27	2	
SWF21	B-B	Offered		1,800 horsepower (1,340 kW)	Caterpillar C27	2	

== Motive Power and Equipment Solutions ==
Motive Power and Equipment Solutions was a locomotive manufacturer and rebuilder active in Greenville, South Carolina from 1999 until 2022. This company is not to be confused with MotivePower.

Model designation	Wheel arrangement	Build year	Total produced	Power output	# of engines	Engine type	Image
MP-900	B-B	1999–2022		900 horsepower (671 kW)	2	Cummins QSX15 (I6) Tier 2	See here
MP-900	B-B	2009–2022		900 horsepower (671 kW)	2	Cummins QSX15 (I6) Tier 3	See here
MP-900	B-B	2012–2022		900 horsepower (671 kW)	2	Cummins QSX15 (I6) Tier 4	See here
MP-1200	B-B	2012–2022		1,200 horsepower (895 kW)	2	Cummins QSX15 (I6) Tier 4	
MP-1500	B-B	2007–2022		1,500 horsepower (1,120 kW)	2	Cummins QSX19 (I6) Tier 3	
MP-1500 "Greenville"	B-B	2014–2022		1,500 horsepower (1,120 kW)	2	Cummins QSK19 (I6) Tier 3 with CNG/Diesel Dual Fuel	
MP550-B1	B-B	2013	At least 1	550 horsepower (410 kW)	1	Cummins QSX15 Tier 3	
MP2000NG	B-B	2018-2020 (Note: Rebuilt from ex-Tri-Rail MK F40PHL-2 locomotives.)	2 (for D&SNG)	2,000 horsepower (1,490 kW)		?	See here

== MotivePower ==
Model designation	Wheel arrangement	Build year	Total produced	Power output	# of engines	Engine type	Image
MP8AC-3	B-B	2012–2013	28	800 horsepower (597 kW)	1 (plus HEP engine)	Cummins QSK-23 (I6)	
MP14B	B-B	2008–present	7	1,400 horsepower (1,040 kW)	2	Cummins QSK-19C (I6)	
MP21B	B-B	2008–present	1	2,100 horsepower (1,570 kW)	3	Cummins QSK-19C (I6)	
MP20B	B-B	2008–present	21	2,000 horsepower (1,490 kW)	1	MTU-Detroit Diesel 12v4000 (V12)	
MP20C	C-C	2007–present	14	2,000 horsepower (1,490 kW)	1	MTU-Detroit Diesel 12v4000 (V12)	
MP36PH-3C	B-B	2003–present	113	3,600 horsepower (2,680 kW)	1 (plus HEP engine)	GE (EMD) 16-645F3B (V16)	
MP36PH-3S	B-B	2003–present	27	3,600 horsepower (2,680 kW)	1	GE (EMD) 16-645F3B (V16)	
MP40PH-3C	B-B	2008–present	70	4,000 horsepower (2,980 kW)	1 (plus HEP engine)	EMD 16-710G3B-T2 (V16)	
MP32PH-Q	B-B	2014–present	10	3,200 horsepower (2,390 kW)	1 (plus HEP engine)	GE (EMD) 16-645F3B (V16)	
HSP46	B-B	2013–present	40	4,650 horsepower (3,470 kW)	1	GE GEVO-12 (V12)	

== National Railway Equipment ==
Model designation	Wheel arrangement	Build year	Total produced	Power output	# of engines	Engine type	Image
1GS7B	B-B	2008–present	9	700 horsepower (522 kW)	1	Cummins QSK19C (I6)	
2GS12B	B-B	2014–present	4	1,200 horsepower (895 kW)	2	Cummins QSX15 (I6) Tier 4	
2GS14B	B-B	2005–present	18	1,400 horsepower (1,040 kW)	2	Cummins QSK19C (I6)	
3GS21B	B-B	2006–present	171	2,100 horsepower (1,570 kW)	3	Cummins QSK19C (I6)	
3GS21C	C-C	2008–present	3	2,100 horsepower (1,570 kW)	3	Cummins QSK19C (I6)	
2GS36C-DE	C-C	2011–present	1	3,600 horsepower (2,680 kW)	2	Cummins QSK50L (V16)	

== Progress Rail ==
Model designation	Wheel arrangement	Build year	Total produced	Power output	# of engines	Engine type	Image
PR15B	B-B	2008–present		1,490 horsepower (1,110 kW)	2	Caterpillar C18 (I6)	
PR22B	B-B	2008–present		2,235 horsepower (1,670 kW)	3	Caterpillar C18 (I6)	
PR30C	C-C	2009–present		3,005 horsepower (2,240 kW)	1	Caterpillar 3516 (V16)	
PR43C	C-C	2009–2011	12	4,300 horsepower (3,210 kW)	2	Caterpillar C175 (V16) and Caterpillar C18 (I6)	

== Railpower Technologies ==
Model designation	Wheel arrangement	Build year	Total produced	Power output	# of engines	Engine type	Image
GGS2000D "Emerald"	B-B	2001	1 (prototype)	2,000 horsepower (1,490 kW)	1	130 Hp Caterpillar	
GG20B "Green Goat"	B-B	2004–present	55	2,000 horsepower (1,490 kW)	1	300 Hp Caterpillar	
GG10B "Green Goat"	B-B	2005–present	6	1,000 horsepower (746 kW)	1	300 Hp Caterpillar	
GK10B "Green Kid"	B-B	2005–present	4	1,000 horsepower (746 kW)	1	300 Hp Caterpillar	
RP20BH (Hybrid)	B-B	2006–present	1 (prototype)	2,000 horsepower (1,490 kW)	2	Deutz	
RP20BD (Genset)	B-B	2008–present	116	2,000 horsepower (1,490 kW)	3	Deutz	
RP14BD	B-B	2008–present	8	1,400 horsepower (1,040 kW)	2	Deutz	
RP20CD	C-C	2007–present	6	2,000 horsepower (1,490 kW)	3	Deutz	
RP27CD	C-C	2009–present	0	2,667 horsepower (1,990 kW)	4	Deutz	

== Siemens Mobility ==
Model designation	Wheel arrangement	Build year	Total produced	Power output	# of engines	Engine type	Image
Siemens Charger	B-B	2016–present	392	4,000 horsepower (2,980 kW), 4,200 horsepower (3,130 kW), 4,400 horsepower (3,280 kW)	1	Cummins QSK95	

== Vehicle Projects ==
In 2009, a company called Vehicle Projects, in cooperation with BNSF Railway, rebuilt one Railpower GG20B locomotive into a prototype hydrogen-powered locomotive, called an HH20B.

Model designation	Wheel arrangement	Build year	Total produced	Power output	# of engines	Engine type	Image
HH20B	B-B	2009 (Note: Originally built in 1957 as an EMD GP9 for the Canadian Pacific Railway. Rebuilt into a GG20B in 2006, and then into the HH20B in 2009.)	1	2,000 horsepower (1,490 kW)	0	Hydrogen fuel cell	
