= Environmental design in rail transportation =

Environmental design is an emerging topic in railroad technology. From the 1980s to 2009, fuel efficiency in diesel locomotives in the USA has increased 85%, allowing these trains to go farther and move more freight while using less fuel. New low-impact electric and hybrid trains reduce overall carbon emissions. Also, train manufacturers have started utilizing hydrogen technology for propulsion, with carbon emissions only coming from the manufacturing of the hydrogen itself.

== Increasing efficiency while lowering emissions ==
=== Diesel trains ===
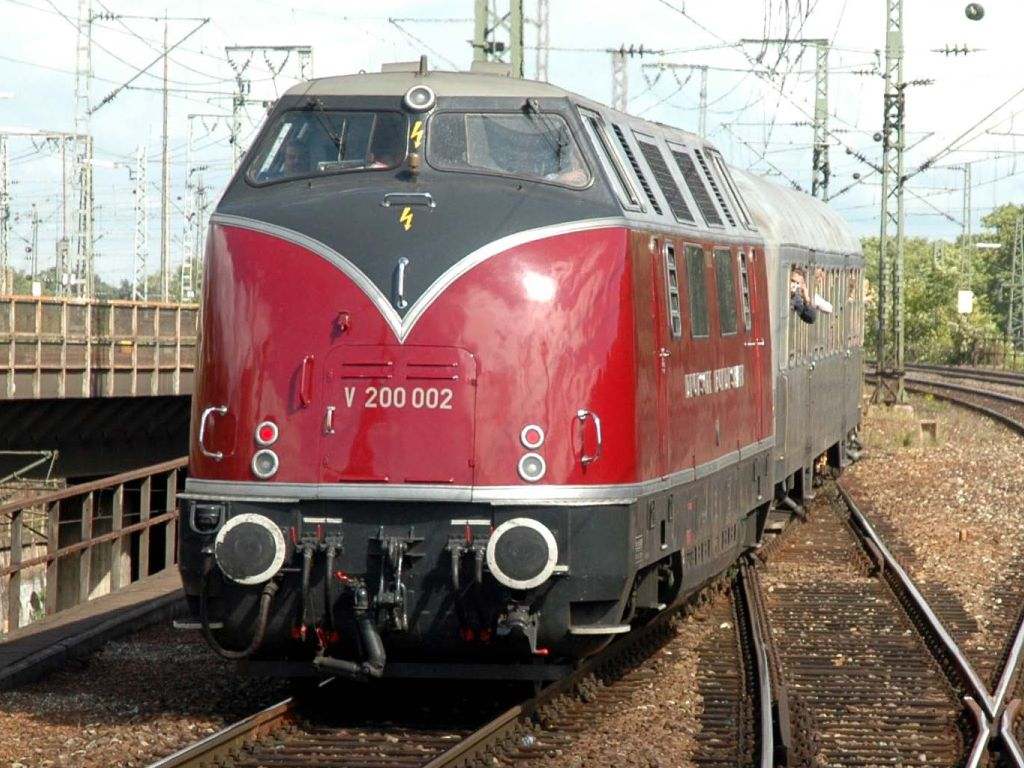
Diesel Train

Diesel trains replaced the steam engine in the late 1920s as a cleaner more efficient way of moving people and goods. Since 1980, the amount of freight being hauled by Diesel Trains has nearly doubled, yet the fuel consumption of trains has virtually stayed the same. Estimates have shown that about 170 million m^{3} (45 billion US gal) of fuel have been saved by increasing the efficiency in diesel trains. US Department of Energy reported that commercial airline energy intensity was 2,352 kilojoules per kilometre (3,587 BTU/mi), automobiles were 2,327 kilojoules per kilometre (3,549 BTU/mi), while commuter rail energy intensity was just 1,804 kilojoules per kilometre (2,751 BTU/mi), which indicates that rail transportation is the most energy efficient of the three. The Union Pacific Rail Road has implemented a particle filter on their diesel engines. Silicon carbide blocks trap particles from the exhaust as they leave the engine, greatly reducing emissions.

=== Electric trains ===
Electric trains have always had no direct carbon emissions because they are run entirely by internal electric motors. However, the means of generating the electricity used to power these motors was predominately by burning fossil fuels or coal, both of which produce a large amount of carbon emissions. With the emergence of 'clean energy' generation, electrical trains actually run with very low environmental impact. For example, the proposal for the high-speed rail line between San Francisco and Los Angeles in California has the potential for zero greenhouse gas emissions, with the 3,350 GWh each year being generated by California's extensive infrastructure of renewable energy sources.

=== Hybrid trains ===
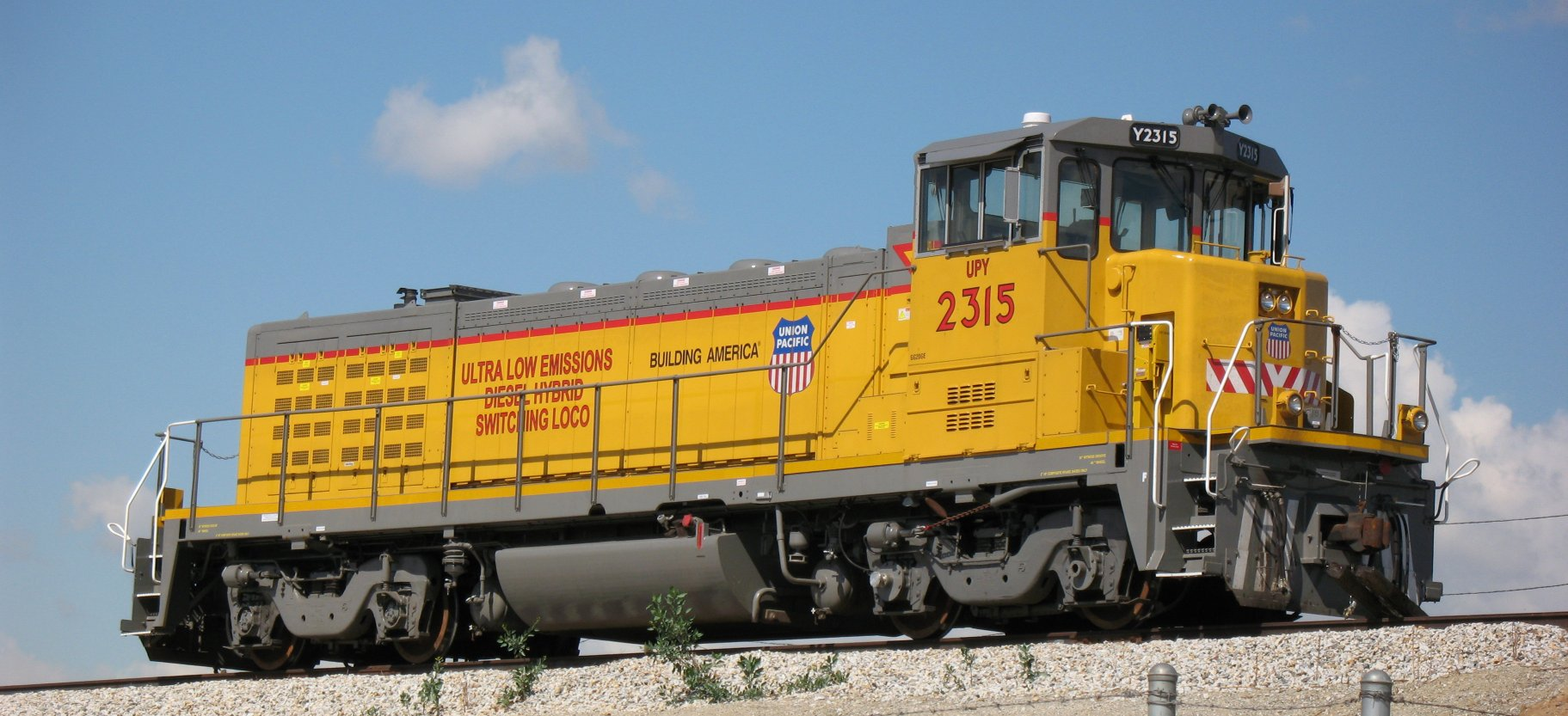
RailPower GG20B Green Goat diesel-hybrid locomotive.

Since 1986, engineers have been developing electric-diesel "hybrid" trains. One type of hybrid train implements battery power when the train is idling and at low speed movement, and a diesel engine at higher speeds. To recharge the batteries, power from the diesel motor, charge utilizing regenerative braking, or a combination of both is used. According to the Institute of Electrical and Electronics Engineers, hybrid trains reduce the carbon emissions of Diesel Trains by 19%. Another type of hybrid train, such as the RailPower Technologies Green Goat, uses a large battery, and a small set of generators ("genset") for power. The genset is run at a constant speed and is attached to a generator to replenish the battery.

=== Hydrail ===
Hydrogen propulsion is an emerging technology, and is currently being implemented in locomotives. Hydrogen-powered trains dubbed "Hydrail" emit only water as a by product of combustion, and have a zero direct greenhouse gas emission. However, the process used to generate hydrogen in a form useful to power trains does produce a small amount of greenhouse gases. By using wind energy and electrolysis, 6.85 grams of greenhouse gases per MJ of LHV are produced, which is an insignificant amount compared to the 22 pounds of greenhouse gas emissions from one gallon of gasoline. Trains are prime targets for hydrogen propulsion due to their ability to store massive tanks of hydrogen.

== Emissions comparison ==
Rail transportation emits about 0.2 pounds of greenhouse gases per passenger mile (56 g/km) when each car is filled with 50 passengers. This figure increases to about 0.5 pounds per passenger mile (140 g/km) when only filled with half that amount. These numbers are still much lower than those of jet transportation, about 1 pound per passenger mile (280 g/km), and that of a solo car driver, about 1.15 pounds per passenger mile (325 g/km). Even the fuel efficient Prius emits more greenhouse gases per passenger mile.

Estimates have shown that if just 10% of long-distance freight that is currently moving by truck were to be moved instead by diesel trains, the resulting carbon emission reduction would be the equivalent of taking 2 million cars off the road. The results are more dramatic when the diesel train figures are replaced by hybrid and electric train figures.

== See also ==
- Environmental issues with energy
- Green track
- List of low emissions locomotives
- Railroad ecology
