= Central California Traction Company =

Class III railroad in San Joaquin County

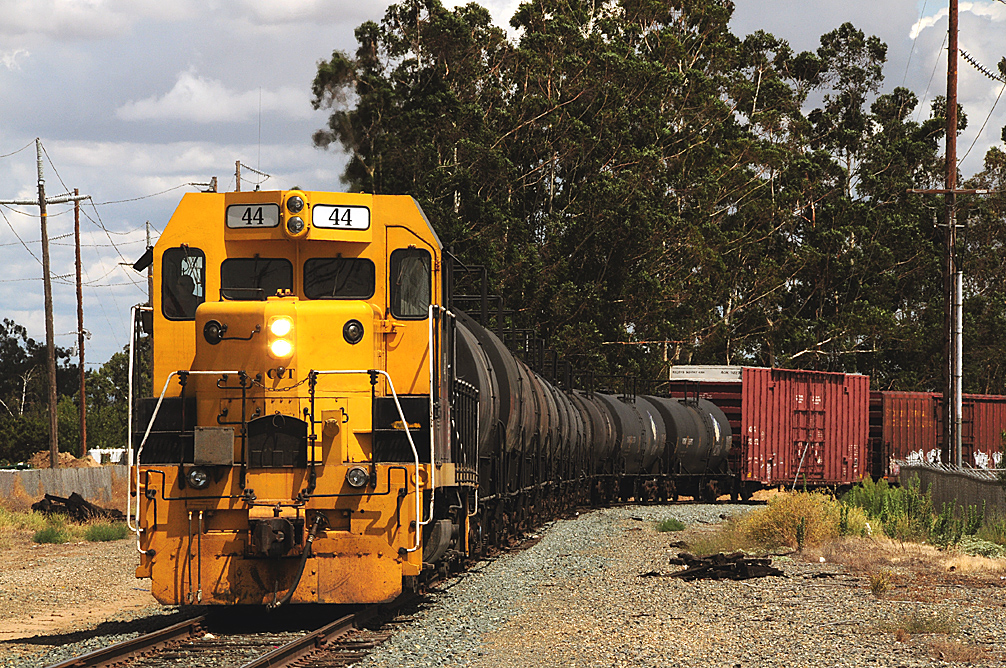
- Central California Traction's ex Alameda Belt/ATSF GP7 #44 entering the yard in Lodi

Overview
- Parent company: Union Pacific; BNSF Railway
- Headquarters: Stockton, California
- Reporting mark: CCT
- Locale: San Joaquin Valley, California
- Dates of operation: 1905–

Technical
- Track gauge: 4 ft 8 1/2 in (1,435 mm) standard gauge
- Electrification: Third rail, 1,200 V DC (countryside); Overhead line, 600 V DC (within city limits) none since 1946
- Length: 52.1 miles (83.8 km)

Other
- Website: www.cctrailroad.com

The Central California Traction Company (reporting mark CCT) is a Class III short-line railroad operating in the northern San Joaquin Valley, in San Joaquin County, California. It is owned jointly by the Union Pacific and BNSF Railway.

== Service ==
The railroad operates between Stockton and Lodi. CCT also operates the Stockton Public Belt Railway around the Port of Stockton.

It connects to the Stockton Terminal and Eastern Railroad company freight lines that serve greater Stockton. Several miles of the CCT track through Acampo are being used to store rolling stock, primarily Centerbeam flatcars that carry lumber, as of 2009.

== History ==
The Central California Traction Company was incorporated on August 7, 1905. Streetcar service began on March 3, 1906 with nine miles (14 km) of trackage in Stockton. The company also had greater ambitions and became an electric interurban railway, opening a line from Stockton to Lodi starting on September 2, 1907. The original line into Lodi ran down Lodi Avenue, turning north on Sacramento Street and reaching as far north as Turner Road. In 1908, current on the third rail system was raised from 550 volts to 1,200 volts. The extension to Sacramento began service on September 1, 1910.

In 1928, the railroad was sold by the original owners and was then jointly purchased by the Atchison, Topeka and Santa Fe Railroad, the Southern Pacific Railroad and the Western Pacific Railroad. The Stockton streetcar operations were taken over by Stockton Electric Railroad (by then an SP Subsidiary) in 1929. Interurban service ceased on February 4, 1933, but local streetcars continued to run in Sacramento until the service was acquired by National City Lines in 1943. Electric service ended on December 22, 1946.

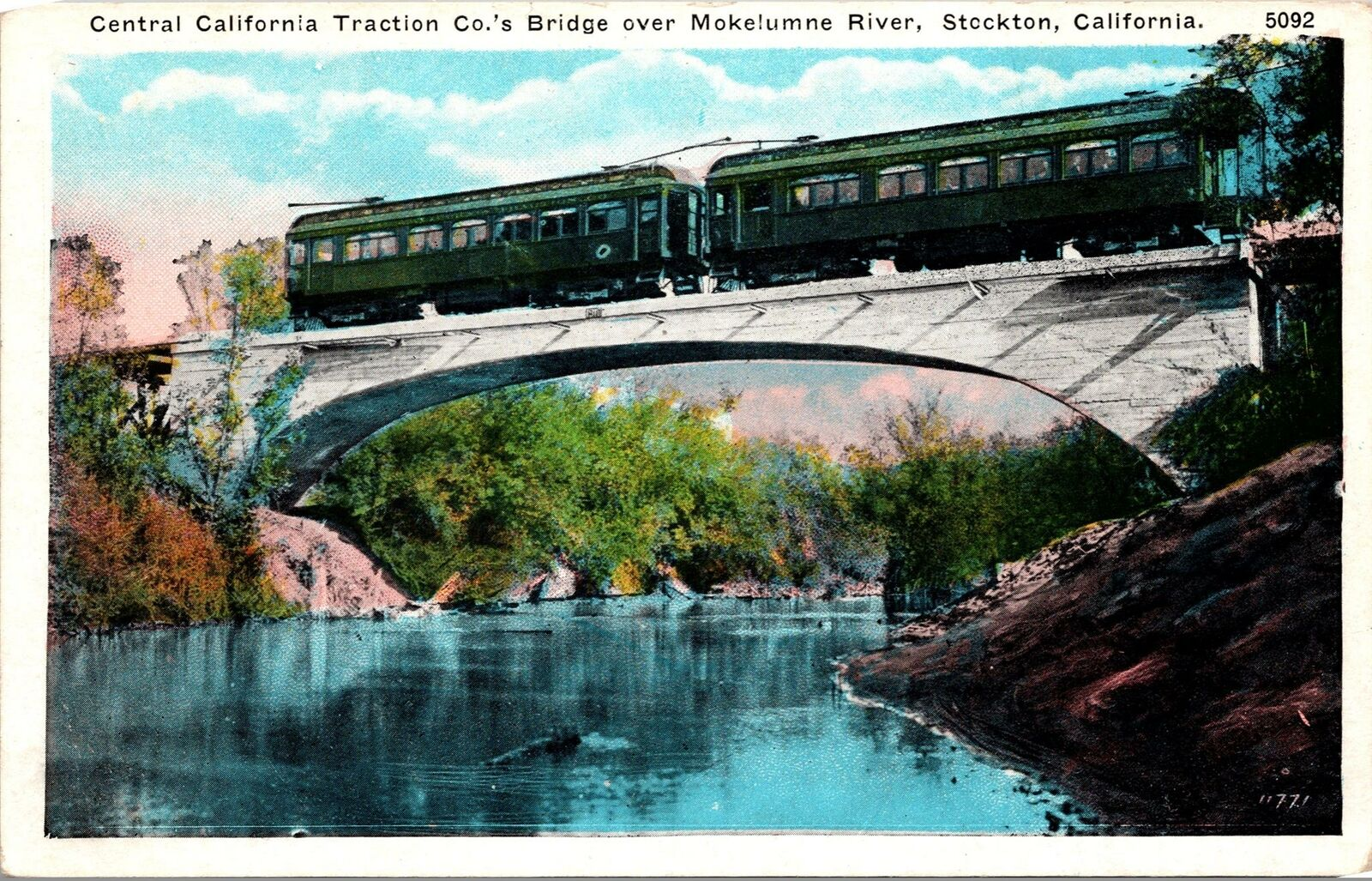
Interurban passenger cars pass over the Mokelumne River c. 1915–1930

The railroad operated over the same line from Lodi and Stockton to Sacramento until 1966 when the Sacramento belt line was closed, then trains were run over Southern Pacific's line into Sacramento. Tracks into Sacramento's city center were removed that year. In 1998, service to Sacramento was suspended. Since then the tracks remain between Stockton and Sacramento, being kept for future operational options.

One of the Central California Traction Company train stations survives in Acampo, just north of Lodi. This station was converted into a residence, with altered interior walls and an expansion.

== Locomotive roster ==
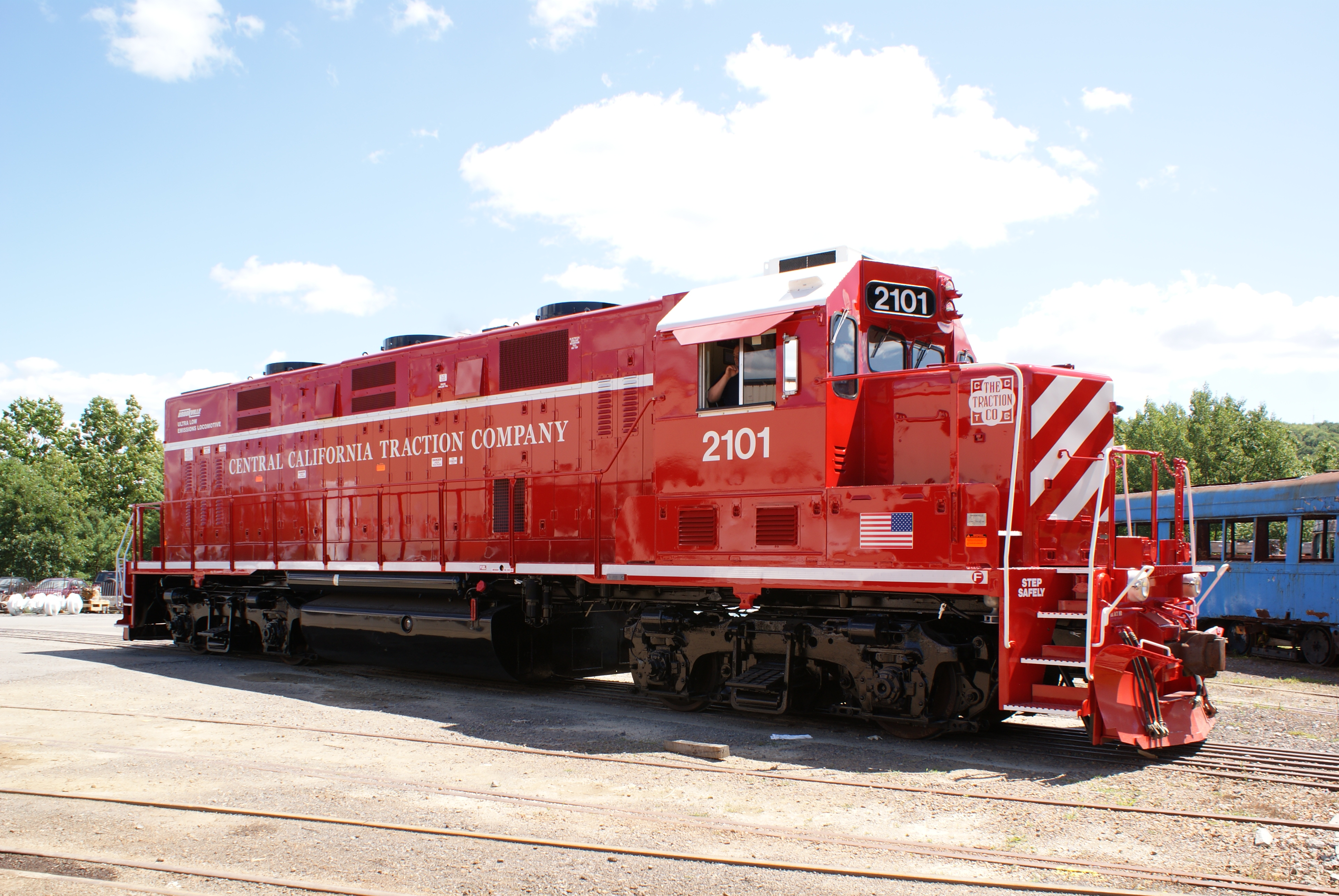
CCT locomotive model BL21CG, built by Brookville Industries

Model	Road no.
GE 44-ton switcher	25
GE 44-ton switcher	26
GE 70-ton switcher	30
GE 70-ton switcher	31
GE 70-ton switcher	32
ALCO S1	40
ALCO S1	41
ALCO S1	42
ALCO S2	45
EMD GP7u	44
ALCO S4	50
EMD GP7	60
EMD GP7	70
EMD GP7	700
ALCO RS-1	80
Brookville BL12CG	1201 & 1202
EMD SW1500	1222
EMD SW1500	1501
EMD SW1500	1502
EMD SW1500	1503
EMD SW1500	1504
NRE 3GS21B	BNSF 1243, 1247 & 1270
Brookville BL20CG	2101
EMD GP18	1790
EMD GP18	1795

== See also ==
- List of California Interurban Railroads
- Sacramento Northern Railway
- Stockton Terminal and Eastern Railroad
