= Sacramento RiverTrain =

The Sacramento River Fox Train is a tourist train operated by Sierra Northern Railway that runs special excursions near West Sacramento, California.

== History ==
The route was originally the Woodland branch line of the Sacramento Northern Railroad, a Western Pacific Railroad subsidiary. Which was acquired by the Sierra Railroad via predecessor Yolo Shortline Railroad Company who purchased the line from the Union Pacific.

== Services ==
The Sacramento RiverTrain offers three hour round trips with dining and entertainment options such as libation excursions, family-friendly holiday excursions, and murder mysteries. Their most popular excursions are the Beer Train, Old Vine Express wine tasting train, and the Magical Christmas Train. The train also operates a railbike service as Sacramento Railbikes.

The River Fox Train is owned by Sierra Railroad and operates under the Sierra Northern Railway now. It has one section of track that is 16 miles (26 km) long.

== See also ==
- Sacramento Southern Railroad—which operates excursions across the Sacramento River from the RiverTrain
- List of heritage railroads in the United States
