= Railserve Leaf =

The Railserve Leaf is a genset locomotive built by Railserve. It is constructed in both single- and dual-engine variants, and is primarily used in low-speed and high tractive effort switching and shortline applications.

The Leaf was introduced in the single-engine model in 2010, of which 32 had been built by the end of 2012. The dual-engine version of the locomotive, powered by two 600-horsepower Cummins QSX15 engines, was introduced in 2012. In 2016, the locomotive was updated to meet EPA Tier 4 emissions standards, and the first Tier 4–compliant Leaf entered service in mid-2017.
