= Sacramento Southern Railroad =

Heritage railway in California

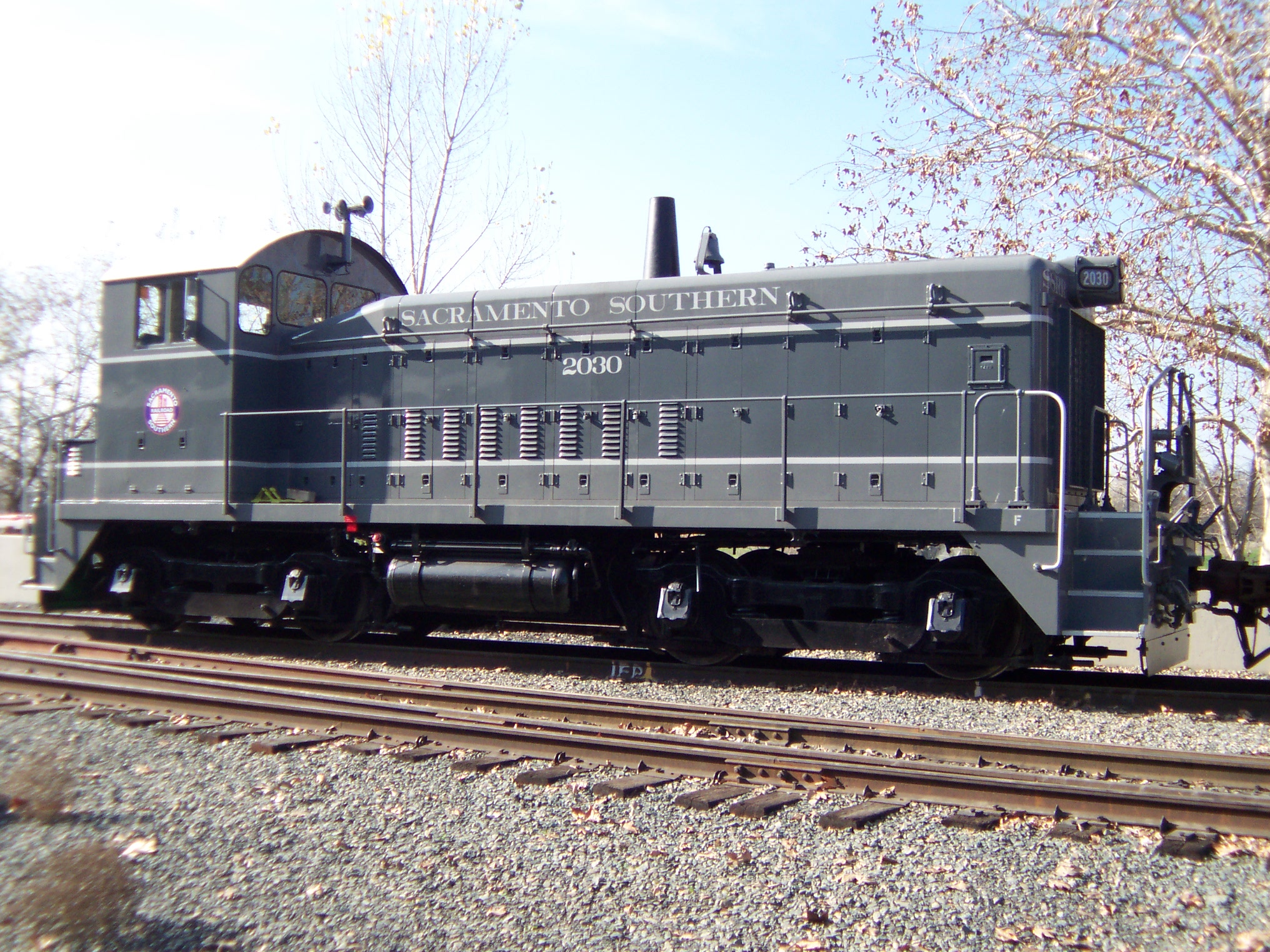
- Sacramento Southern Railroad #2030 performs some local switching duties on the SSRR line located just south of the California State Railroad Museum in Sacramento in December, 2004.
- Locale: Sacramento Freeport, California; original route was to Walnut Grove
- Terminus: Freeport, California; original route was to Walnut Grove
- Connections: Union Pacific Railroad (Freight)

Commercial operations
- Built by: The original Sacramento Southern Railroad a non-operating subsidiary of the Southern Pacific Company
- Original gauge: 4 ft 8 1/2 in (1,435 mm) standard gauge

Preserved operations
- Owned by: California State Railroad Museum
- Operated by: California State Railroad Museum
- Reporting mark: SSRR
- Length: 3 miles
- Preserved gauge: 4 ft 8 1/2 in (1,435 mm) standard gauge

Commercial history
- Opened: 1909
- 1912: Merged with Central Pacific Railroad
- (?): Became a part of the SP system
- Closed: 1978

Preservation history
- c. 1978: Property acquired by the museum
- (?): Freight service resumed
- 1982: Excursions started
- Present: In operation
- Headquarters: California State Railroad Museum at Sacramento

Website
- Official website

The Sacramento Southern Railroad is a heritage railway owned by the California State Railroad Museum which operates excursion trains on it. The railroad extends from the museum property located in Old Sacramento State Historic Park south along the east bank of the Sacramento River levee.

The original Sacramento Southern Railroad ran south 24.3 miles (39.1 km) to Walnut Grove, California via Freeport and was a non-operating subsidiary of the Southern Pacific Transportation Company incorporated in 1903.

The line was constructed between 1906–1912, and the first train began operating over the line in 1909. It was merged in 1912 with the Central Pacific Railroad upon completion of the line to Walnut Grove. The line was extended to Isleton by 1929. In 1931, a 3-mile (5 km) extension of the branch reached the Mokelumne River. Southern Pacific ended passenger service on the line the following year.

The railroad later became a part of the SP system who filed with the Interstate Commerce Commission to abandon the line, and did so on October 10, 1978. Around that time the California State Railroad Museum started acquiring the rail property, and started excursions in 1982. Recent years have seen a resurgence in the road's freight business, serving a number of local industries via an interchange with the Union Pacific Railroad. However, with the last customer on the line closing down in the mid 2010s, freight has stagnated. Future plans call for expanding operations southward into the Sacramento–San Joaquin River Delta area.

== See also ==
- List of heritage railroads in the United States
- Sacramento RiverTrain—which operates excursions across the Sacramento River from the SSRR
