= NRE 2GS12B =

Low-emissions diesel genset switcher locomotive

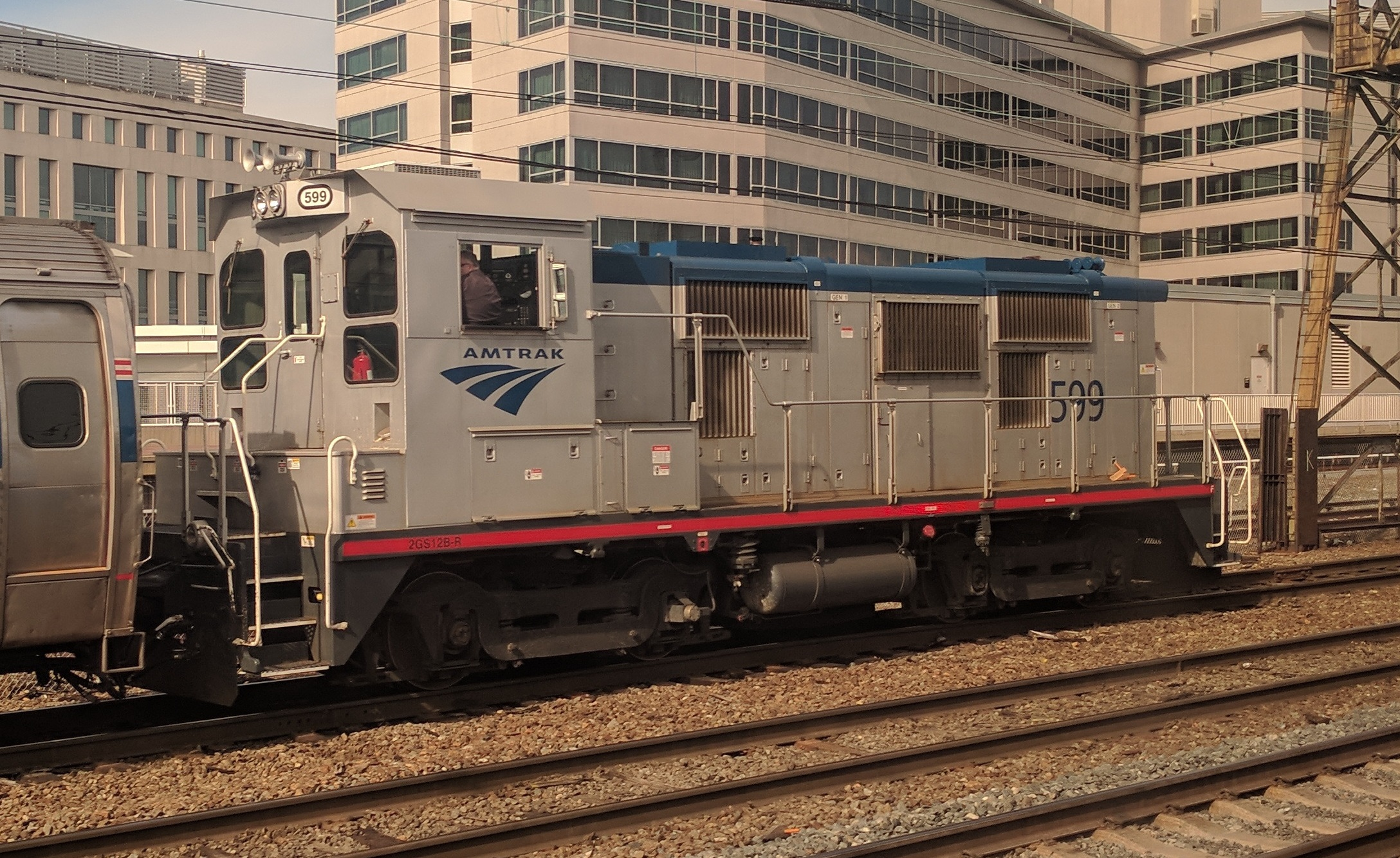
- AMTK 599, a National Railway Equipment 2GS12B locomotive owned by Amtrak.
Type and origin
- Power type: Diesel-electric genset
- Builder: National Railway Equipment Company
- Model: 2GS12B
- Build date: 2014–2026
- Total produced: 8
Specifications
- Configuration
  - AAR: B-B
  - UIC: Bo'Bo'
- Gauge: 4 ft 8 1/2 in (1,435 mm) standard gauge
- Wheel diameter: 40 in (1,000 mm)
- Height: 15.67 ft (4.78 m)
- Loco weight: 246,000 lb (112,000 kg)
- Fuel type: Diesel
- Fuel capacity: 1,600 US gal (6,100 L; 1,300 imp gal)
- Lubricant cap.: 30 US gal (110 L; 25 imp gal)
- Coolant cap.: 28 US gal (110 L; 23 imp gal)
- Sandbox cap.: 32 ft^{3} (0.91 m^{3})
- Prime mover: Cummins QSK15 (×2)
- Engine type: Straight-six engine
- Generator: Industrial Motor Power 740RDL
- Cylinders: 6 (×2)
- Gear ratio: 62:15
Performance figures
- Power output: 1,200 hp (890 kW) total (600 hp (450 kW) per engine)
- Tractive effort
  - Starting: 85,520 lbf (380,400 N)
  - Continuous: 56,053 lbf (249,340 N) @ 4.3 mph (6.9 km/h)

The NRE 2GS12B is a low-emissions diesel genset switcher locomotive built by National Railway Equipment Company as part of its N-ViroMotive series of low-emission locomotives. It is powered by two Cummins QSK15, a straight-six engine, with each one developing 600 horsepower (450 kW) and creating a total power output of 1,200 hp (890 kW). The locomotives are compliant with the EPA's Tier 4 emissions standards requirements for non-road diesel engines.

== Development ==
In 2004, the United States Environmental Protection Agency ordered that by 2015, all new non-road engines, like those used in locomotives needed to meet the stringent Tier 4 standard: no more than 1.3 grams of NOx per brake horsepower-hour and 0.03 g/bhp-hr of particulates.

Looking to demonstrate a new Tier 4 compliant switcher locomotive, the Bay Area Air Quality Management District received a $529,810 grant from the California Air Resources Board (ARB) Air Quality Improvement Program. The district selected National Railway Equipment Company (NRE) to build the locomotive, which would be tested in the Richmond Pacific Railroad rail yard in Richmond, California.

The ARB approved NRE's final design of the prototype 2GS12B locomotive in April 2012. The locomotive would be a genset (short for "generator set") using two self-contained modular power plants (generators), which onboard computers can turn on and off based on power needs. Each power plant would use a Cummins QSX15 Tier 4 diesel engines rated at 600 horsepower (447 kW) and utilizing exhaust gas recirculation, a catalytic converter, and a diesel particulate filter to reduce emissions to below the Tier 4 thresholds. The power plant was designed not to use selective catalytic reduction, as refilling the necessary diesel exhaust fluid was deemed to be too great a challenge for use in rail yards.

NRE built the prototype 2GS12B locomotive at its Dixmoor, Illinois facility. A used EMD GP7 switcher locomotive was used as a donor unit, stripped to its frame, repowered with the new power plants, and equipped with a new cab. The locomotive rolled off the production line in December 2012 and was delivered to the Richmond Pacific Railroad in March 2013.

As a requirement of the ARB funding, the locomotive was used for three emissions tests: a baseline test completed in October 2013, a test after 1,500 hours of use completed in May 2014, and a final test after 3,000 hours of use completed in October 2014. The ARB verified the prototype locomotive as passing the Tier 4 standard.

Following the success of the prototype locomotive, Amtrak selected NRE to rebuild some of its existing EMD SW1000R switcher locomotives into 2GS12B switchers. The SW1000R fleet was initially built as EMD SW9 switchers and had been rebuilt in 1994 by NRE. Amtrak received the first two 2GS12B in 2014. Amtrak designates these units as 2GS12B-R with the "-R" representing that the locomotive was rebuilt from an older donor locomotive.

Satisfied with the performance of the first two locomotives, Amtrak has contracted NRE to convert additional SW1000R units into 2GS12B locomotives. Two additional units were delivered in 2018, followed by one in August 2020 and two more in March 2026.

== Original buyers ==
Railroad	Quantity	Road numbers	Notes
Amtrak	7	597, 599, 790, 791, 792, 793, 798	All rebuilt from SW1000R locomotives
National Railway Equipment	1	2015	2015 is a demonstrator used on Richmond Pacific Railroad
Total	8		
