= NRE 3GS21C =

Type and origin
- Power type: Diesel-electric
- Builder: National Railway Equipment (NRE)
- Model: 3GS21C
- Build date: 2008 – Present
- Total produced: 27
Specifications
- Configuration
  - AAR: C-C
  - UIC: Co'Co'
- Gauge: 4 ft 8 1/2 in (1,435 mm)
- Prime mover: Cummins QSK19C (×3)
- Engine type: Diesel engine (×3)
- Aspiration: Turbocharger (×3)
- Cylinders: 6 (×3)
Performance figures
- Power output: 2,100 hp (1,570 kW)

The NRE 3GS21C is a low-emissions diesel genset locomotive built by National Railway Equipment (NRE). It is powered by three Cummins QSK19C I6 engines with each one developing 700 horsepower (522 kW) and creating a total power output of 2,100 horsepower (1,570 kW). Instead of a single prime mover, the NRE genset locomotive has three engines that each can be turned off or on as power is needed reducing overall diesel emissions and improving fuel efficiency. At least 27 3GS21C genset locomotives have been produced to date at NRE's Mount Vernon shops in Southern Illinois. The main difference between this and the NRE 3GS21B is that these units are on C-C (six wheel) trucks and the others are on B-B (four wheel) trucks.

== Original buyers ==
Railroad	Quantity	Road numbers	Notes
BNSF Railway	16	1300-1316	ex-ATSF EMD SD40, SD45 and SD45-2
Dallas, Garland & Northeastern Railroad	3	2000-2002	ex-UP EMD SD24B
Norfolk Southern	1	3850	Built in 2008. Ex-Norfolk Southern 3188 EMD SD40
Pacific Harbor Line	2	80-81	The first 3GS21C built, in Jan. 2008
Indiana Harbor Belt Railroad	4	2160-2163	2012
CSX Transportation	1	1600	
Total			

== Flexibility ==
Because the engines are modular, flexibility is obtained:

- If one engine fails, the others can continue at reduced power.
- If a lower axle load is needed, one engine can be omitted.
- When reduced power is needed, one or more of the engines can be turned off, saving fuel and wear and tear.
- The QSK19C engine is common to the four variants of the NRE 3GS21C locomotive.
- The QSK19C engine is widely used for non-railway applications, and spare parts are readily available.

== See also ==
- NRE 3GS21B
