= Sierra Northern Railway =

Freight train service in California

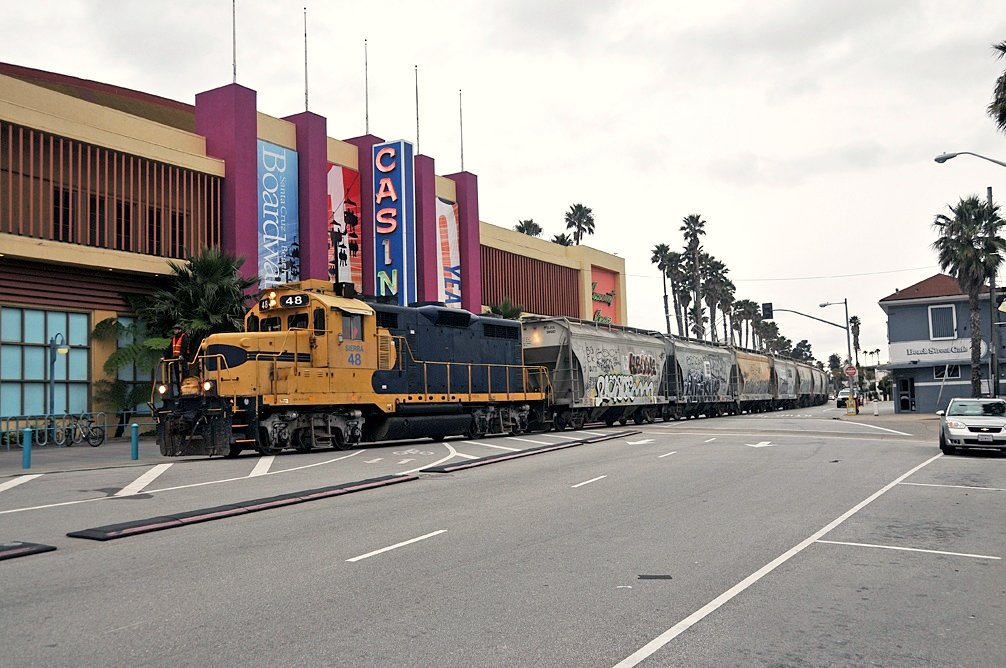
- A Sierra Northern EMD GP20 in Santa Cruz.

Overview
- Headquarters: Woodland, California
- Reporting mark: SERA
- Locale: California
- Dates of operation: 2003–present

Technical
- Track gauge: 4 ft 8 1/2 in (1,435 mm) standard gauge
- Length: 99 miles (159 km)

Other
- Website: http://www.sierranorthern.com

The Sierra Northern Railway (reporting mark SERA) is a common carrier railroad company operating in California. The company owns several rights of way originating from those of the former Sacramento Northern Railroad, Sierra Railway Company Of California, Southern Pacific Railroad and Yolo Shortline Railroad. It handles all freight operations and track maintenance for its parent company, the Sierra Railroad Company. The tracks that are maintained by Sierra Northern are also used by the Sierra Railroad Company's tourist trains. According to the AAR, the line operates 99 miles (159 km) of track in California. It serves a number of industrial areas in the state and interchanges with the Union Pacific Railroad, the BNSF Railway and the Northwestern Pacific Railroad.

== History ==
In August 2003, the Sierra Railroad and the Yolo Shortline Railroad merged to form the Sierra Northern Railway. The newly formed Sierra Northern operated the former Sierra Railroad trackage and Sacramento Northern trackage between Woodland and Clarksburg. It also inherited the operational rights over the Yolo Port Belt Railroad. Later that year on December 17, 2003, SERA would purchase the financially unstable California Western Railroad, saving it from going under. The SERA would form the Mendocino Railway to operate it. On December 23, 2004, SERA filed to abandon the line between Clarksburg and West Sacramento, the abandonment was approved and the line was ripped up the next year, later being partially converted into a rail trail. In 2010 the SERA would be given the opportunity to operate the Santa Cruz Branch, as its owner, the Union Pacific was eager in finding another railroad to operate it. Due to the main customer of the line (a cement plant in Davenport) having shut down the year prior, the UP sweetened the deal by promising common carrier privileges in West Sacramento. After spending millions of dollars in repairs on the line, UP did not fulfill their promises. SERA proceeded to pull out of Santa Cruz in 2011. 2020 saw the end of freight service on the Woodland Branch, as the weir the line went over in West Sacramento was being widened, resulting in that portion of the track being abandoned and the line being severed from the rest of the system. The line continues to operate for tourist trains and rail-bikes. In 2022, the company signed a 30-year lease to operate over the Santa Paula Branch Line, formerly operated by the Fillmore and Western Railway. In 2024, SERA received an environmental award from the American Short Line and Regional Railroad Association. Citing their breakthroughs in terms of a hydrogen powered locomotive and a new transload facility in the Central Valley.

== Routes ==
- Oakdale Division - Riverbank, California to Sonora, California – 57.4 miles (92.4 km)
- Yolo Shortline Division - Woodland, California to West Sacramento, California – 16 miles (26 km)
- West Sacramento - West Sacramento, California – 8 miles (13 km)
- Mendocino Railway - Fort Bragg, California to Willits, California – 40 miles (64 km)
- Ventura Division - Montalvo, California to Piru, California – 29 miles (47 km)

== Former routes ==
- Holland Branch - West Sacramento, California to Clarksburg, California – 9.27 miles (14.92 km)
- Santa Cruz Branch - Watsonville, California to Davenport, California - 30 miles (48 km)

== Interchanges with other railroads ==
The SERA actively interchanges with both the Union Pacific and BNSF. The interchanges with the UP occur in West Sacramento on the Yolo Shortline Division, Oakdale on the Oakdale Division and Santa Paula on the Santa Paula Branch. The SERA interchanges with BNSF in Riverbank on Oakdale Division. Historically the California Western interchanged with the Northwestern Pacific, but since its closure of the line in Willits, the line is isolated from the National Rail Network.

The Oakdale interchange is unique in that the UP trackage is isolated from the rest of their system, and UP trains have to traverse the SERA via trackage rights to access the line.

== Services ==
=== Transload facilities ===
- Wamble Transload facility - Oakdale Division - Oakdale, California
- Port of West Sacramento - West Sacramento Division - West Sacramento, California
- Santa Paula - Ventura Division - Santa Paula, California

=== Railcar Storage ===
SERA provides railcar storage on all three of its major lines, 900+ cars being able to be stored combined.

=== Contract switching ===
SERA offers train crews and switchings to businesses who don't have trained staff or locomotives. A current client is Procter & Gamble, to whom SERA has provided locomotives and crews for.

=== Equipment and track services ===
SERA offers railcar and locomotive repairs and inspections. Along with that, the company offers the same for trackage and right of way. They also provide help with the designs of new trackage and crossings.

== Railpower Technologies ==
On February 7, 2025, Sierra Northern acquired prominent genset locomotive builder Railpower Technologies from R.J. Corman.

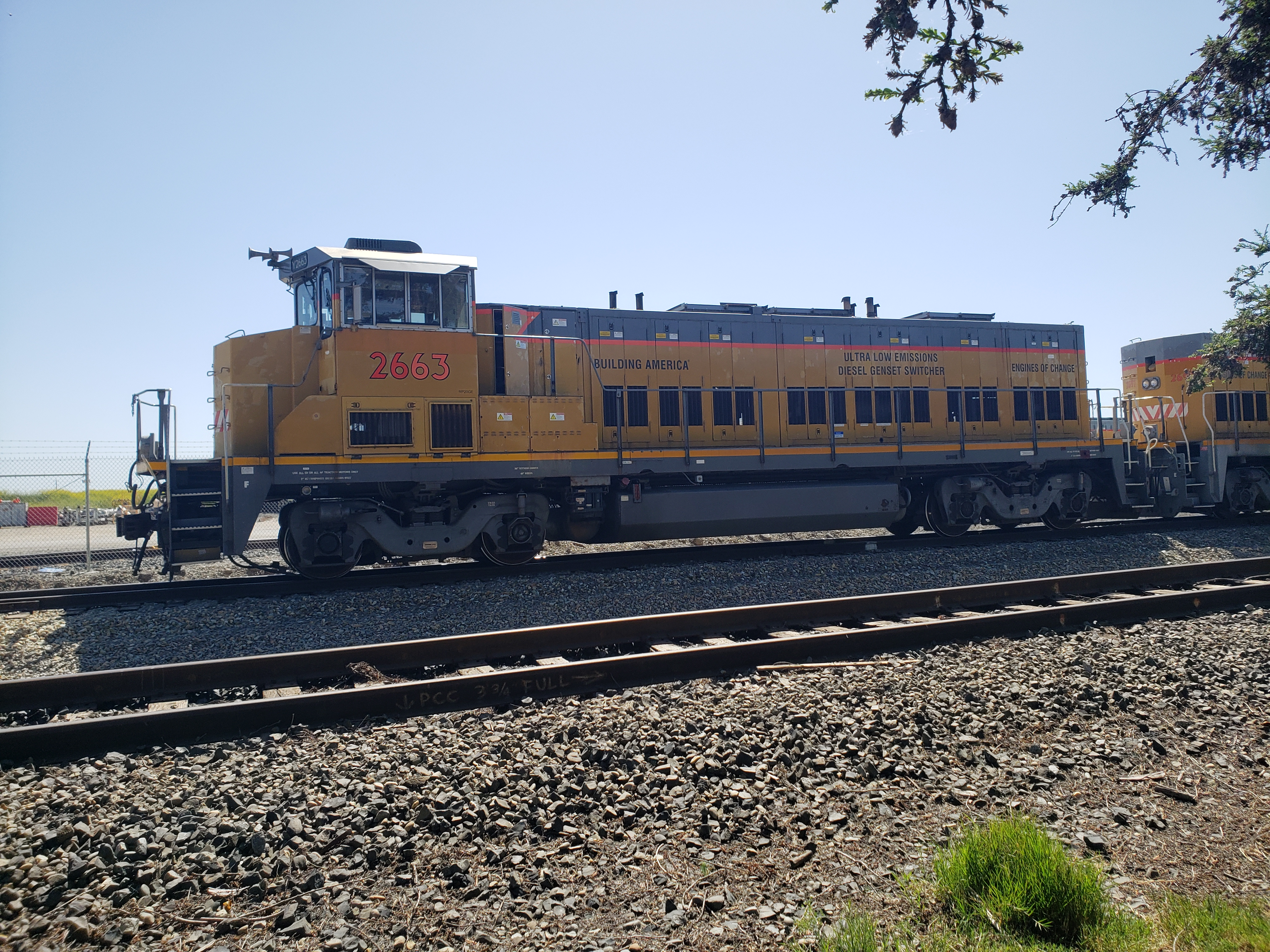
A Railpower Locomotive owned by Sierra Northern

On March 27, 2025, Sierra Northern completed testing of a hydrogen locomotive which was funded through a $4,000,000 grant from the California Energy Commission.

== See also ==
- Sacramento RiverTrain
- Sierra Railroad
- California Western Railroad
- Railpower
