= Railpower RP20BD =

Diesel electric switcher

RP20BD
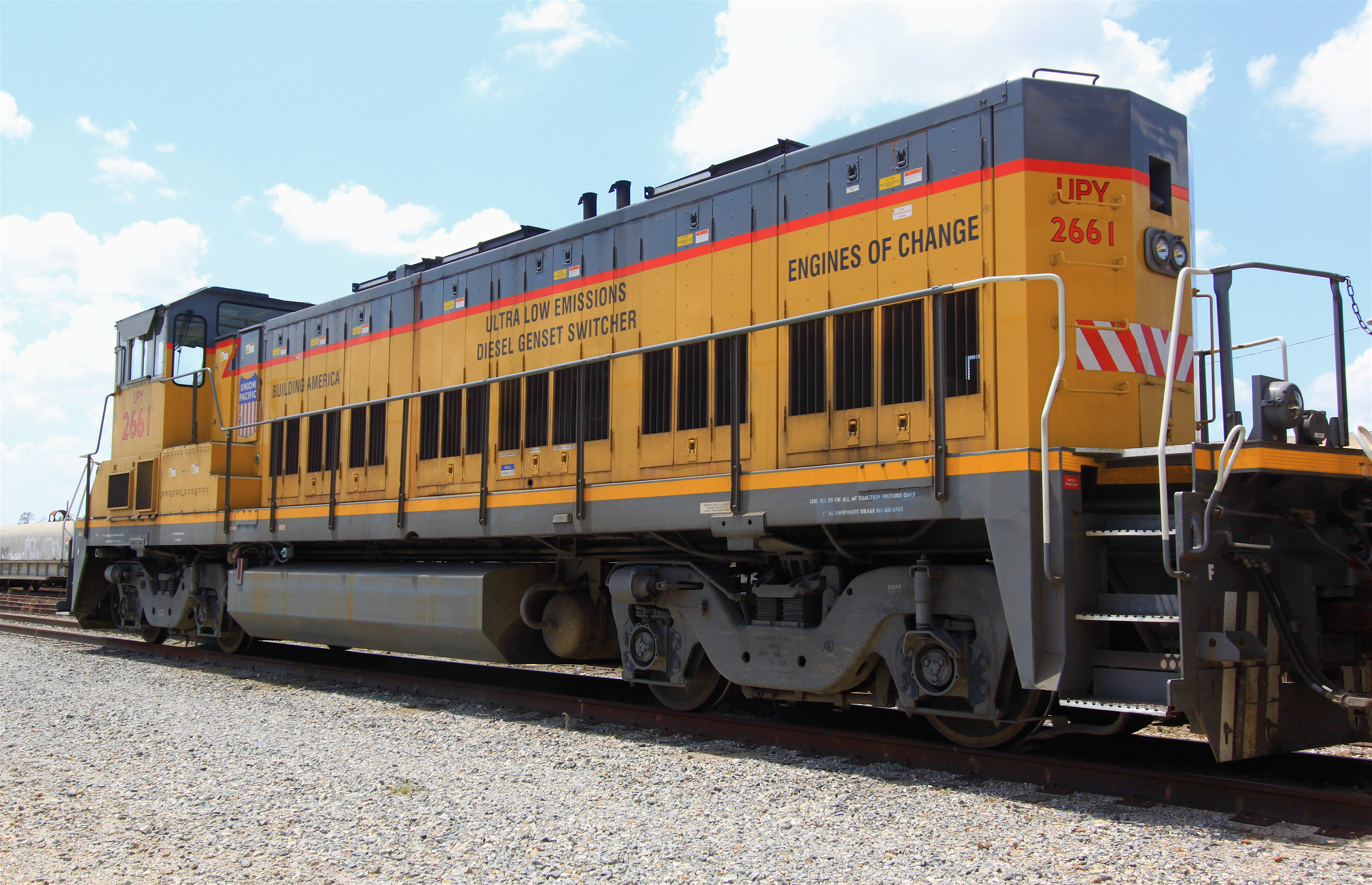
- UPY #2661 at the Eureka Yard in Houston, Texas.
Type and origin
- Power type: Diesel-electric
- Designer: RailPower Technologies
- Builder: RailPower Technologies
- Build date: 2006–
- Total produced: 107
Specifications
- Configuration
  - AAR: B-B
  - UIC: Bo'Bo'
- Gauge: 4 ft 8 1/2 in (1,435 mm)
- Trucks: Standard B-B Rebuilt Trucks
- Wheelbase: 9'-00"in
- Length: 61'-02"in
- Height: 15'-04.5"in
- Loco weight: 275,000 lbs
- Fuel type: Diesel fuel
- Fuel capacity: 3000 gallons
- Prime mover: x3 Deutz TCD2015 V08 V8 Engines
- RPM range: 1500-2100 rpm
  - RPM idle: 1500 rpm
  - Maximum RPM: 2100 rpm
- Engine type: Four-stroke diesel engine
- Aspiration: Turbocharger
- Displacement: 15.9 liters (970 CUI) per engine (Roughly 47.7 liters or 2,910.83 CUI in total)
- Generator: NEWAGE 752RDL
- Traction motors: x4 General Electric 752AF
- Cylinders: 8
- Cylinder size: 5.2 in × 5.7 in (130 mm × 140 mm)
- Transmission: Diesel-electric
- Loco brake: Air brake
- Train brakes: Air brakes
Performance figures
- Maximum speed: 112.654 km/h (70 mph)
- Power output: 2,000 hp (1.49 MW)
- Tractive effort: 47 lbf (0.21 kN)
Career
- Operators: Union Pacific Railway, Norfolk Southern, CSX Transportation, R. J. Corman Railroad Group, Sierra Northern Railway, Modesto & Empire Traction Company, Genesee & Wyoming Inc. (and other properties under the name), Northwestern Pacific Railroad, Port of Montreal
- Nicknames: Genset
- Locale: United States Of America, Canada
- Delivered: 2006-2013

The RP20BD is a diesel-electric switcher locomotive built by Railpower Technologies. It is a "genset" locomotive, having three engine-generator sets.

The engines are computer controlled, with the computer stopping and starting engines on a rotating basis, as required to produce the horsepower needed at any given moment.

RP20BDs are rebuilt from older locomotives such as the General Electric Dash 7 series and EMD General Purpose series.
