= EMD GP20D =

Type of diesel-electric locomotive

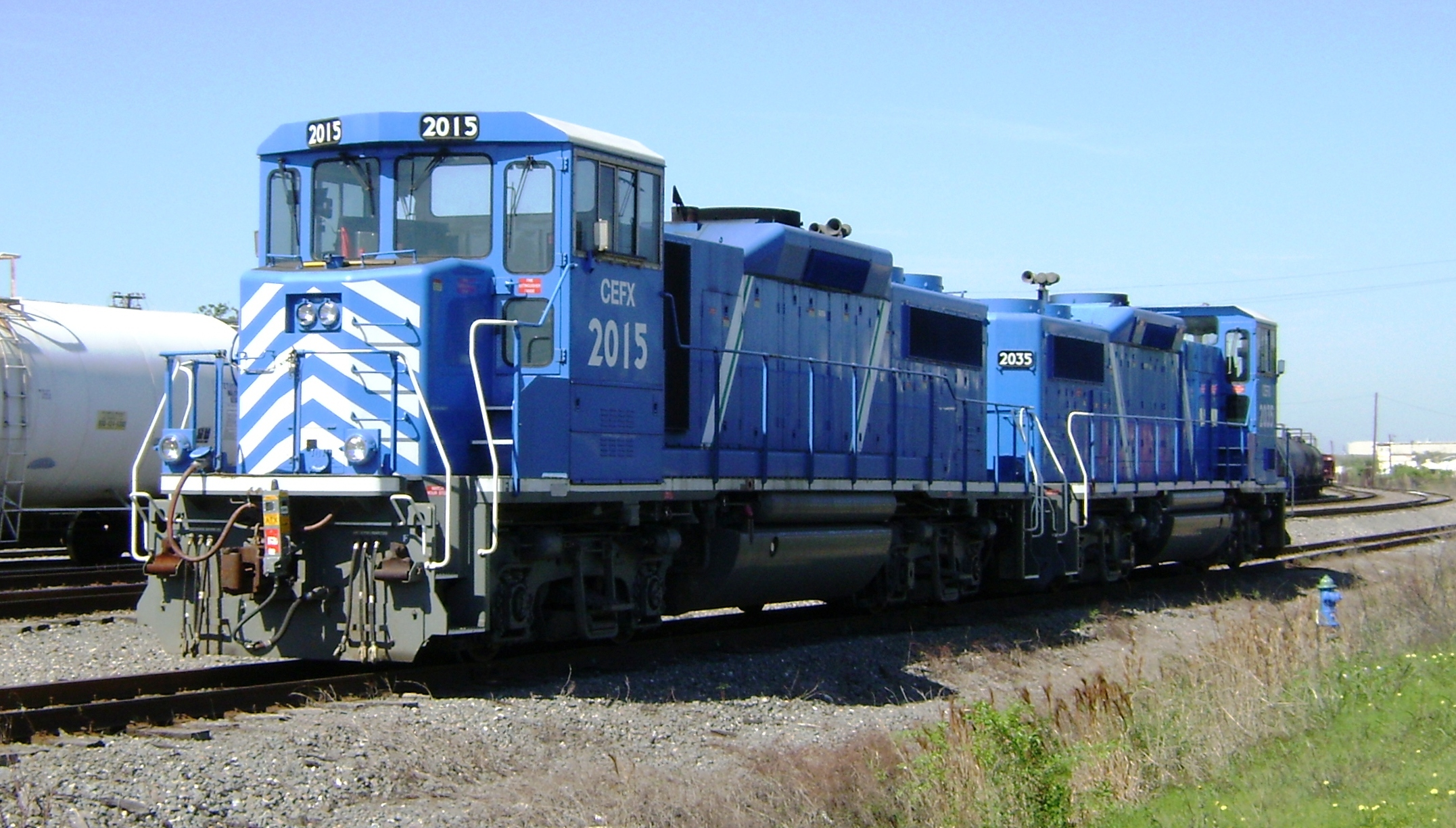
- Two EMD GP20D's in the CEFX scheme. Note that both hoods are lowered.
Type and origin
- Power type: Diesel-electric
- Builder: MotivePower & Electro-Motive Diesel
- Model: GP20D
- Build date: June 2000 – August 2001
- Total produced: 40
Specifications
- Configuration
  - AAR: B-B
- Gauge: 4 ft 8 1/2 in (1,435 mm) standard gauge
- Fuel capacity: 2,550 US gal (9,700 L; 2,120 imp gal)
- Prime mover: EMD Caterpillar 3516 (EMD 16-170B20-T2)
- Engine type: Four-stroke V16 fuel injected diesel
- Aspiration: Turbocharged
- Cylinders: 16
- Loco brake: Dynamic
Performance figures
- Maximum speed: 70 mph (113 km/h)
- Power output: 2,000 hp (1,490 kW)
- Tractive effort: 65,000 lbf (290 kN) continuous 97,000 lbf (430 kN) starting 38,000 lbf (170 kN) braking

The GP20D is a four-axle B-B switcher locomotive built by MotivePower and Electro-Motive Diesel. It was supplied with a Caterpillar 3516 (called a 16-170B20-T2 by EMD) V16 prime mover which develops a total power output of 2,000 horsepower (1,490 kW). To date, only 40 units have been produced by EMD, all of which were manufactured during June 2000. The GP20D is also a hood unit with lowered long and short hoods based on MotivePower's earlier MP2000D locomotives. The changes between the MP2000D and the GP20D are primarily in the control electronics, making them easier to use than the older model.

Although the GP20D is marketed as a switcher, it has a top speed of 70 mph (113 km/h), and is usually fitted with dynamic brakes, making it suitable for road switcher duties as well. The similar appearing EMD GP15D does not have dynamic brakes and has a lower horsepower rating (1500 vs 2000).

== Original Buyers ==
Railroad	Quantity	Road numbers	Notes
CIT Group	40	2001-2040	
Total	40		

== See also ==
- List of GM-EMD locomotives
