= Railpower RP20CD =

Diesel-electric locomotive

RP20CD
Type and origin
- Power type: Diesel-electric
- Builder: RailPower Technologies
- Build date: 2008–
Specifications
- Configuration
  - AAR: C-C
  - UIC: Co'Co'
- Gauge: 4 ft 8 1/2 in (1,435 mm)
- Loco weight: 398,000 lb (180,500 kg)
- Fuel type: Diesel fuel
- Fuel capacity: 4,000 imp gal (18,000 L; 4,800 US gal)
Performance figures
- Power output: 2,000 hp (1.49 MW)

The RP20CD is a diesel-electric road switcher locomotive built by Railpower Technologies. It is a "genset" locomotive, having three engine-generator sets.

The engines are computer controlled, with the computer stopping and starting engines on a rotating basis, as required to produce the horsepower needed at any given moment.

It has six-wheel (three-axle) trucks, rather than the usual four-wheel (two-axle) trucks commonly found on smaller, lighter, switcher locomotives. RP20CDs are rebuilt from older locomotives and can be upgraded to 2,700 horsepower (2.01 MW) by adding a fourth generator.
