= EMD GP15D =

Class of US diesel locomotive

EMD GP15D MPI GP15D
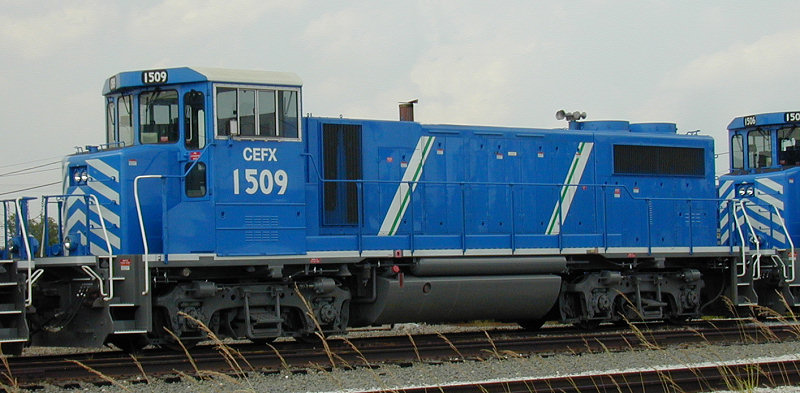
- CEFX 1509 is an EMD GP15D under lease to Union Pacific in Houston, Texas.
Type and origin
- Power type: Diesel-electric
- Builder: MotivePower (MPI) and Electro-Motive Diesel (EMD)
- Model: GP15D
- Build date: June 2000 – May 2001, 2004
- Total produced: 20
Specifications
- Configuration
  - AAR: B-B
  - UIC: Bo'Bo'
- Gauge: 4 ft 8 1/2 in (1,435 mm)
- Prime mover: EMD Caterpillar 3512 (EMD 12-170B15-T2)
- Engine type: V12 Four-stroke fuel injected diesel
- Aspiration: Turbocharged
- Cylinders: 12
- Loco brake: 26L air brakes
Performance figures
- Maximum speed: 70 mph (113 km/h)
- Power output: 1,500 hp (1,120 kW)

The GP15D is a four-axle B-B switcher locomotive built by MotivePower and Electro-Motive Diesel. It was supplied with a Caterpillar 3512 (called a 12-170B15-T2 by EMD) V12 prime mover which develops a total power output of 1,500 horsepower (1,120 kW). Ten units were manufactured by EMD during June 2000. Another 10 units were manufactured for Amtrak by MotivePower during 2004.

The GP15D is a hood unit with lowered long and short hoods based on MotivePower's earlier MP1500D locomotives. The changes between the MP1500D and the GP15D are primarily in the control electronics, making them easier to use than the older model. Although the GP15D was marketed as a switcher, it has a top speed of 70 mph (113 km/h), making it suitable for road switcher duties as well. The GP15D is also similar in appearance to the contemporaneous GP20D, except that the 20 GP15D units produced to date do not have dynamic brakes and have a lower horsepower rating (1500 vs 2000).

== See also ==
- List of GM-EMD locomotives
