= Progress Rail PR43C =

Model of American diesel locomotive

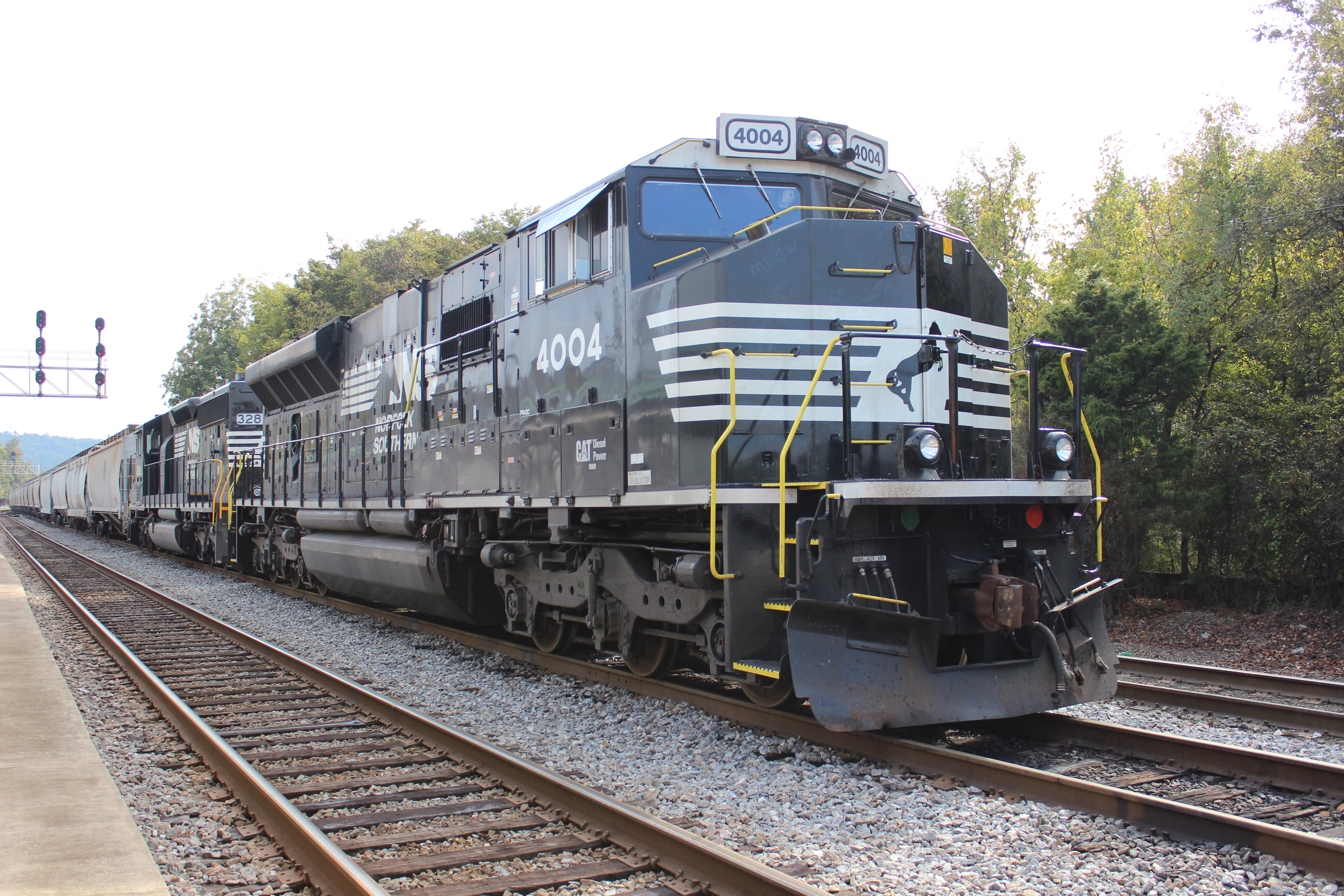
- NS 4004 Progress Rail PR43C at Anniston Alabama
Type and origin
- Power type: Diesel-electric
- Builder: Progress Rail Services Corporation
Specifications
- Configuration
  - AAR: C-C
- Gauge: 4 ft 8 1/2 in (1,435 mm)
- Prime mover: Caterpillar C175-12 and Caterpillar C18
Performance figures
- Power output: 4,300 hp (3,210 kW)
Career
- Locale: North America
- Disposition: All scrapped

The Progress Rail PR43C was a 4,300 hp (3,210 kW) C-C genset diesel-electric locomotive built by Progress Rail Services Corporation. It was the result of a conversion of existing EMD SD50 locomotives. This involved replacing the original EMD 645 prime mover with a pair of Caterpillar engines, a 3,600 hp (2,680 kW) 12 cylinder C175 engine and a 700 hp (522 kW) C18 engine. The locomotive was jointly designed by Progress Rail and Norfolk Southern Railway. Development began in 2008.

Three locomotives were built; they were manufactured at Progress Rail's Mayfield, Kentucky factory. Two operated in revenue freight service on Norfolk Southern, while a third operated as a demonstrator unit for Progress Rail. At one time Norfolk Southern had four more PR43Cs on order. The locomotives operated by Norfolk Southern worked on freight trains in central Illinois, leading to speculation that they were being tested, as Caterpillar's headquarters are located in Peoria, Illinois.

The process of converting an SD50 to a PR43C altered the external appearance of the locomotive; the original radiator section was replaced with a larger one similar in appearance to that of an EMD SD70ACe or SD70M-2.

As a result of repeated failures, the locomotives were retired in 2017, and all were cut up for scrap in 2018. Prior to retirement, they were renumbered to avoid number conflicts with the AC44C6Ms.
