= Railpower RP14BD =

Diesel-electric switcher

RP14BD
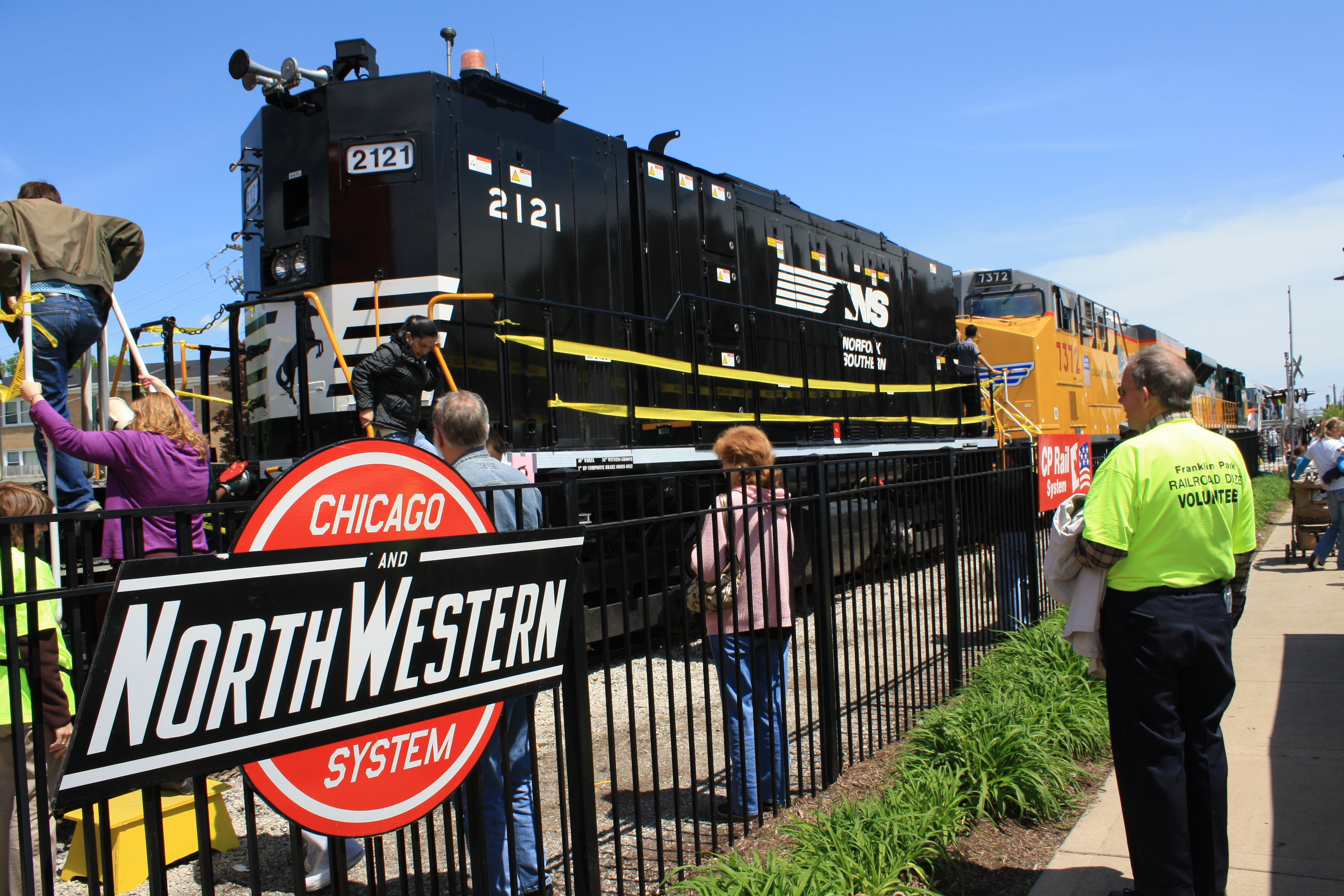
- NS #2121, rebuilt from an EMD SW1500.
Type and origin
- Power type: Diesel-electric
- Builder: RailPower Technologies
- Build date: 2008–
Specifications
- Configuration
  - AAR: B-B
  - UIC: Bo'Bo'
- Gauge: 4 ft 8 1/2 in (1,435 mm)
- Fuel type: Diesel fuel
Performance figures
- Power output: 1,400 hp (1.04 MW)

The RP14BD is a diesel-electric switcher locomotive built by Railpower Technologies. It is a "genset" locomotive, having two engine-generator sets.

The engines are computer controlled, with the computer stopping and starting engines on a rotating basis, as required to produce the horsepower needed at any given moment.

RP14BDs are rebuilt from older locomotives. They can be built with or without an operating cab.

== See also ==
- Genset locomotive
