= Brookville BL12CG =

4-axle diesel-electric locomotive

BL12CG
Type and origin
- Power type: Diesel
- Builder: Brookville Equipment Corporation
- Build date: 2015–present
- Total produced: 2
Specifications
- Configuration
  - AAR: B-B
  - UIC: Bo′Bo′
- Gauge: 4 ft 8 1/2 in (1,435 mm) standard gauge
- Trucks: Blomberg B
- Loco weight: 264,000 lb (119,748 kg)
- Prime mover: 2 × Cummins
- Traction motors: D78
Performance figures
- Power output: 1,200 horsepower (890 kW)
Career
- Operators: Central California Traction Company
- Numbers: 1201-1202

The Brookville BL12CG is a 4-axle diesel-electric locomotive built by the Brookville Equipment Corporation. The locomotive is designed to meet Tier 4 emissions standards. The first two were delivered to the Central California Traction Company in April 2015.
