= Railpower Technologies =

Canadian locomotive manufacturer

- Industry: Rail transport
- Founded: 2001
- Products: Low-emissions locomotives
- Owner: Sierra Railroad (2025-present); R.J. Corman Railroad Group (2009-2025); Independent (2001-2009)
- Number of employees: 26 (as of 2010)
- Website: https://www.railpower.com/

Railpower Technologies is a North American manufacturer of environmentally friendly hybrid switching locomotives, including Green Goats and genset locomotives. It was originally founded by Frank Donnelly and Gerard Koldyk. Its locomotives have been purchased by Canadian Pacific Railway, BNSF Railway, Kansas City Southern Railway and Union Pacific Railroad among others.

== History ==
=== As an independent company ===
The company was founded in 2001 in Vancouver, British Columbia, and incorporated an automotive propulsion system into a new hybrid yard locomotive, dubbed the "Green Goat". The unit was built off the frame of an EMD GP9, and was powered by a 130 hp (97 kW) diesel engine charging a bank of 320 lead–acid batteries, producing 2,000 hp (1,500 kW). This first unit underwent extensive testing and demonstration in both Canada and the United States for a year, in conjunction with a smaller 1,000 hp (750 kW) unit, called the "Green Kid". The demonstrations were a success, and combined with the introduction of government programs providing assistance to railroads introducing low-emissions locomotives, provided impetus for railroads to adopt Railpower's design, particularly in areas such as Texas and California, where such laws were particularly stringent. Initially, Railpower's products were well received, and the company had 175 total orders by late 2005, consisting of both the original hybrid locomotives and newer genset locomotives, which have multiple engines operating in tandem and have the capability to selectively shut down engines to reduce fuel consumption. Despite the company's early success, sales soon dropped off, largely because of reliability issues with the locomotives (one customer, Canadian Pacific, returned its order due to unsatisfactory performance) and a general slowdown in sales of switching locomotives. As a result of the drop-off in sales, Railpower entered bankruptcy in early 2009, and was purchased by the R.J. Corman Railroad Group during the summer of the same year.

=== As subsidiary of R.J. Corman Railroad Group ===
On June 18, 2009, R.J. Corman Railroad Group announced that it had completed its acquisition of Railpower's assets, although none of the company's liabilities. As a result of the acquisition, customers of Railpower were forced to renegotiate servicing contracts with Corman, as the warranties on the locomotives ceased when the old company was purchased. Corman plans to market genset locomotives exclusively, although company executives have not ruled out hybrid locomotives, saying that though they haven't been abandoned, they are not a priority. In the eight months after Railpower's acquisition, the company has delivered just two locomotives, although according to Corman, proposals have been issued for up to 50 locomotives during the next few years, and the company is confident that orders will resume.

Railpower delivered a single RP20D unit to the Port of Montreal in October 2010, followed by two more in the first quarter of 2012 and a fourth to follow later in the year.

R.J. Corman Railpower announced the closure of the Erie, Pennsylvania, operation, this will take effect on February 29, 2020.

=== Acquisition by Sierra Northern ===
On February 7, 2025, Railpower Technologies was acquired by the Sierra Northern Railway. The Sierra Northern plans on building hydrogen locomotives through Railpower Technologies.

== Green Goat Hybrid switchers ==
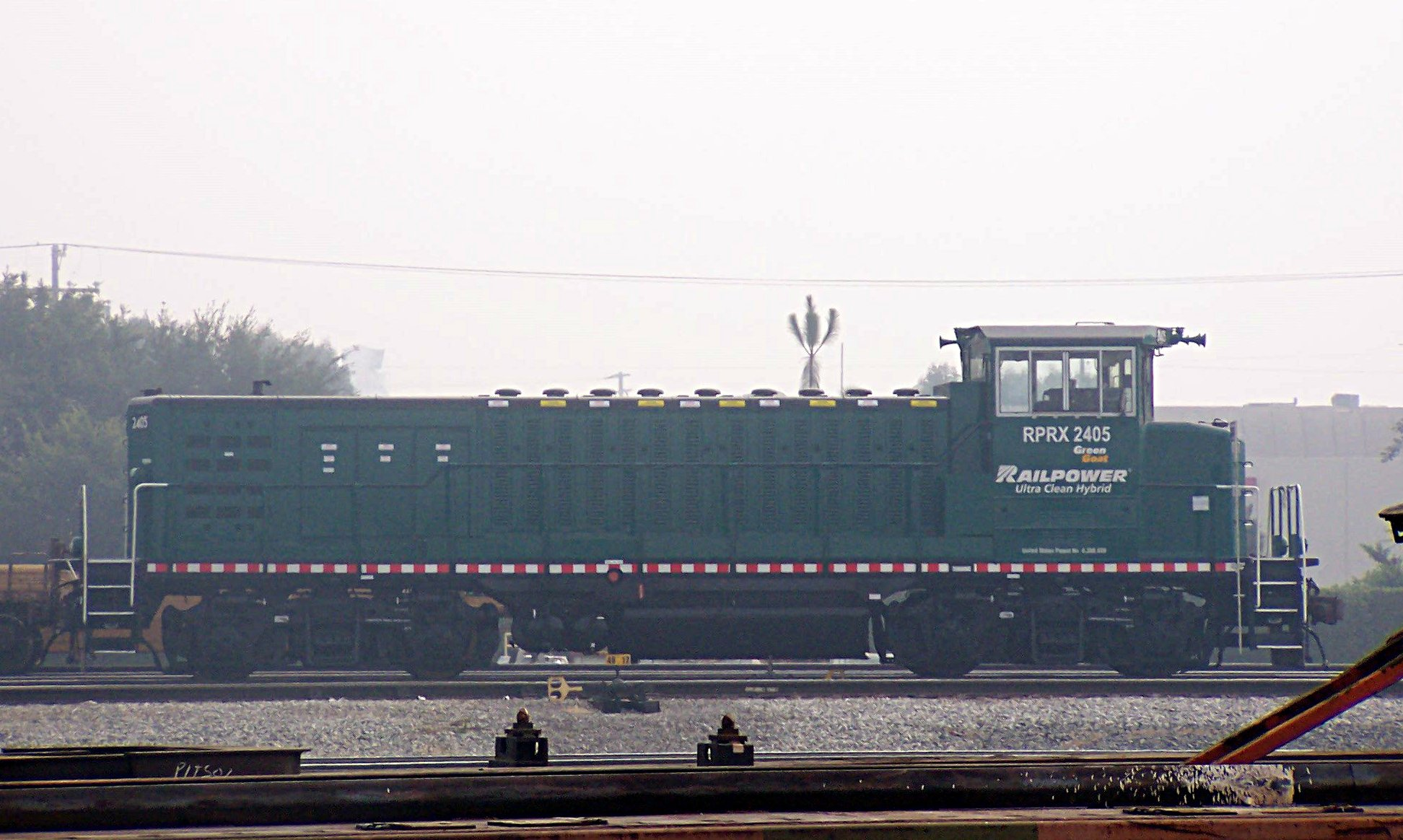
A Green Goat demonstrator

Their locomotive models include the Green Goat (GG) and Green Kid (GK) series. Created from older locomotives, these units are deployed in services where there is a lot of idle time, such as yard switching. Below the frame they are the same as their pre-recycled locomotive. Above the frame they are new, with all new hood and cab assemblies. A small generator and a large bank of batteries power the locomotive. The generator is used to recharge the batteries. The locomotives meet the new EPA exhaust emissions standards. Currently production includes the GG10B, GG20B, and GK10B locomotives. The "B" indicates B-B wheel arrangement the "10" or "20" signifies 1,000 or 2,000 horsepower (746 or 1,490 kW) respectively.

| Model designation | Wheel arrangement | Build year | Total produced | Power output | Image |
|---|---|---|---|---|---|
| GGS2000D "Emerald" | B-B | 2001 | 1 (prototype) | 1,490 kW (2,000 hp) | |
| GG20B "Green Goat" | B-B | 2004–current | 55 | 1,490 kW (2,000 hp) | |
| GG10B "Green Goat" | B-B | 2005–current | 6 | 746 kW (1,000 hp) | |
| GK10B "Green Kid" | B-B | 2005–current | 4 | 746 kW (1,000 hp) | |

== Genset Locomotives ==
Railpower also produces a series of "Genset" type locomotives, which are powered by between 2 and 4 smaller diesel engines each. The engines are computer controlled, with the computer stopping and starting engines on a rotating basis, as required to produce the horsepower needed at any given moment. Currently on the market are the RP20BH (two-engine hybrid) and RP20BD (three engine diesel) locomotives for light road duties. The "B" or "C" in the model number signifies B-B, or C-C wheel arrangement, with the "14", "20" or "27" signifying 1,400 horsepower (1,000 kW), 2,000 or 2,700 horsepower (1,490 or 2,010 kW) respectively.

| Model designation | Wheel arrangement | Build year | Total produced | Power output | # of engines | Image |
|---|---|---|---|---|---|---|
| RP7BD | B-B | present | 0 | 700 kW (940 hp) | 1 | |
| RP20BH (Hybrid) | B-B | 2006–present | 1 (prototype) | 1,490 kW (2,000 hp) | 2 | |
| RP20BD (Genset) | B-B | 2008–present | 116 | 1,490 kW (2,000 hp) | 3 | |
| RP14BD | B-B | 2008–present | 8 | 1,140 kW (1,530 hp) | 2 | |
| RP20CD | C-C | 2007–present | 6 | 1,490 kW (2,000 hp) | 3 | |
| RP27CD | C-C | 2015- | 0 | 1,990 kW (2,670 hp) | 4 | |

== Manufacturing facilities ==
- Saint-Jean-sur-Richelieu, Quebec

== See also ==
- Bombardier Transportation
- Electric vehicle battery
- List of low emissions locomotives
- National Steel Car
