= NRE 3GS21B =

Diesel genset locomotive

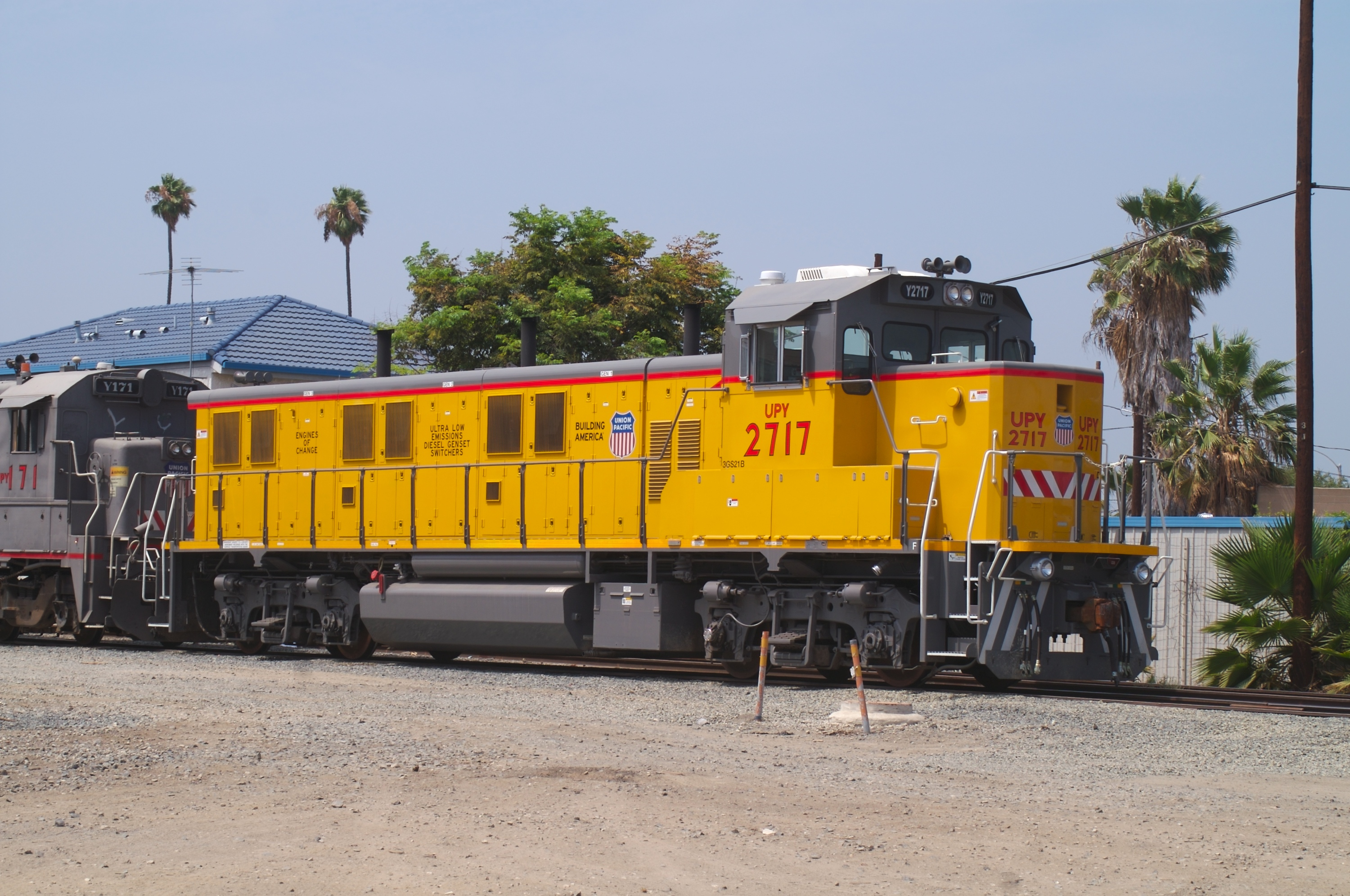
- A new NRE 3GS21B locomotive in the Union Pacific scheme.
Type and origin
- Power type: Diesel-electric
- Builder: National Railway Equipment (NRE)
- Model: 3GS21B
- Build date: December 2006 – Present
- Total produced: 182
Specifications
- Configuration
  - AAR: B-B
  - UIC: Bo'Bo'
- Gauge: 4 ft 8 1/2 in (1,435 mm)
- Prime mover: Cummins QSK19C (×3)
- Engine type: Diesel engine (×3)
- Aspiration: Turbocharger (×3)
- Cylinders: 6 (×3)
Performance figures
- Power output: 2,100 hp (1,570 kW)
Career
- Operators: See list

The NRE 3GS21B is a low-emissions diesel genset locomotive built by National Railway Equipment (NRE). Instead of a single prime mover, the NRE genset locomotive is powered by three separate 700 horsepower (522 kW) Cummins QSK19C engines providing a total power output of 2,100 horsepower (1,570 kW). Each engine could be individually started or shut off depending on how much power is needed, reducing overall diesel emissions and improving fuel efficiency. More than 150 of the 3GS21B genset locomotives have been produced to date, with the majority of these units being manufactured at NRE's Mount Vernon shops in Southern Illinois. In addition, three road slug models have also been produced. The main difference between this and the NRE 3GS21C is that these units are on B-B (four wheel) trucks and the others are on C-C (six wheel) trucks.

== Flexibility ==
Because the engines are modular, flexibility is obtained:

- If one engine fails, the others can continue at reduced power.
- When reduced power is needed, one or more of the engines can be turned off, saving fuel and wear and tear.
- The QSK19C engine is common to the four variants of the NRE 3GS21C locomotive.
- The QSK19C engine is also widely used for non-railway applications, and spare parts are readily available.

== Original buyers ==
Railroad	Quantity	Road numbers	Notes
BNSF Railway	72	1220-1294	1293-1294 equipped with dynamic brakes, classified as 3GS21B-DE. 1259 converted to Q19-2.4GH for Canadian National and remembered 7100 in 2025
California Northern Railroad	6	500-505	
Canadian Pacific	2	2100-2101	Both units equipped with dynamic brakes, classified as 3GS21B-DE, 2100 retired 5/13, 2101 retired 6/13 (both returned to NRE).
CSX Transportation	21	1300-1315, 1321-1325	4 units sold to San Joaquin Valley Railroad and 2 to California Northern Railroad for rebuilding into NZE24B locomotives by Knoxville Locomotive Works. Remaining units sold to KXHR. 1324 sold to LTEX. 1321 was rebuilt from a B36-7 numbered 5850 in 2010 by NRE.
Massachusetts Bay Transportation Authority	2	3248-3249	Both units equipped with dynamic brakes, classified as 3GS21B-DE
Metro Stevedore	1	805	Equipped with dynamic brakes, classified as 3GS21B-DE
Neptune Bulk Terminals	3	805-805A, 808-808A, 809-809A	805A, 808A and 809A are the only road slug model built to date.
Norfolk Southern	2	300-301	
Nova Chemicals	2	9120-9121	
National Railway Equipment	7	2008-2009, 2011, 2013–2015, & 2020	Demonstration Units
Pacific Harbor Line	4	30-31 & 33-34	
Tacoma Rail	1	2100	
Union Pacific	59	Y2701-Y2760	
United States Army	7	6500-6506	
San Diego and Imperial Valley Railroad	2	SDIY 701-702	
Total	182		

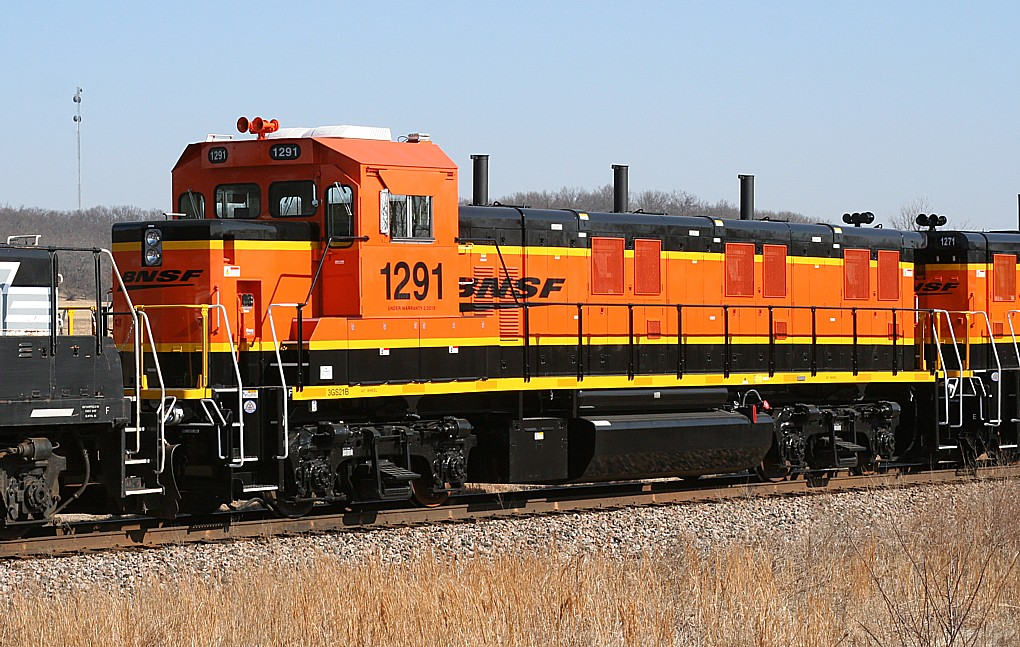
A brand new 3GS21B locomotive painted for the BNSF Railway.

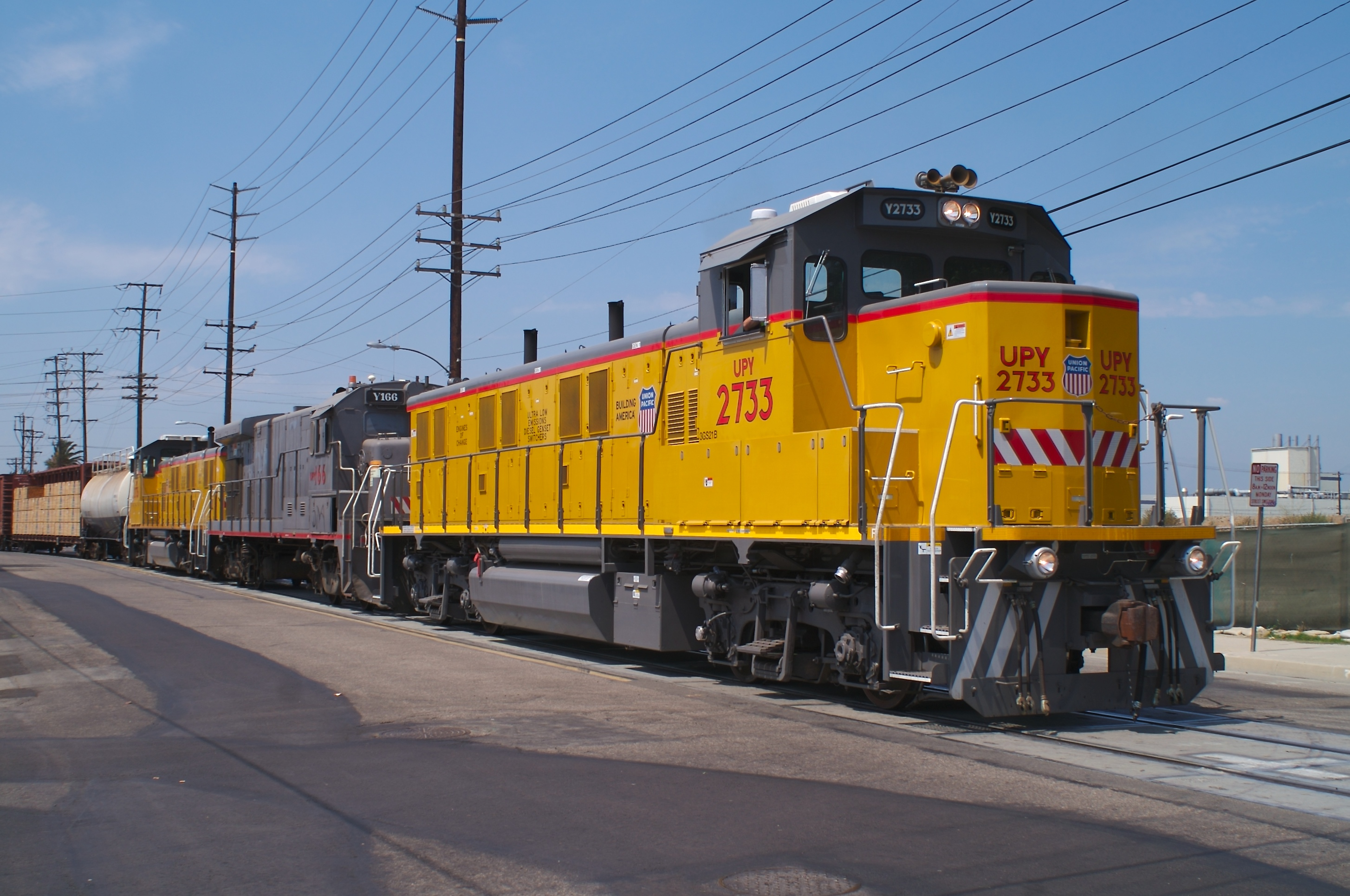
An NRE 3GS21B leads a Union Pacific train along street running trackage at Anaheim, California.

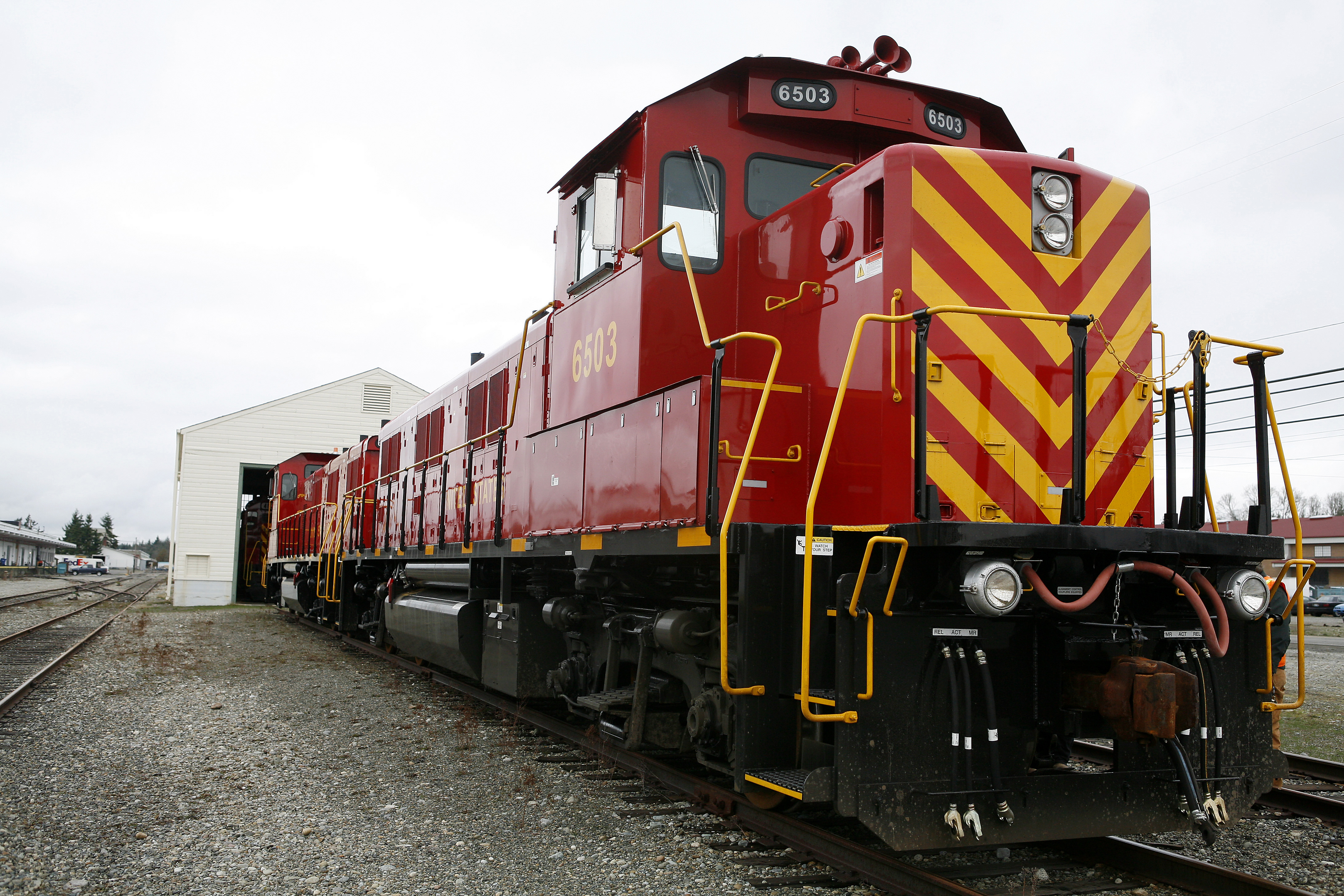
Two brand new U.S. Army 3GS21B locomotives working at Fort Lewis, Washington.

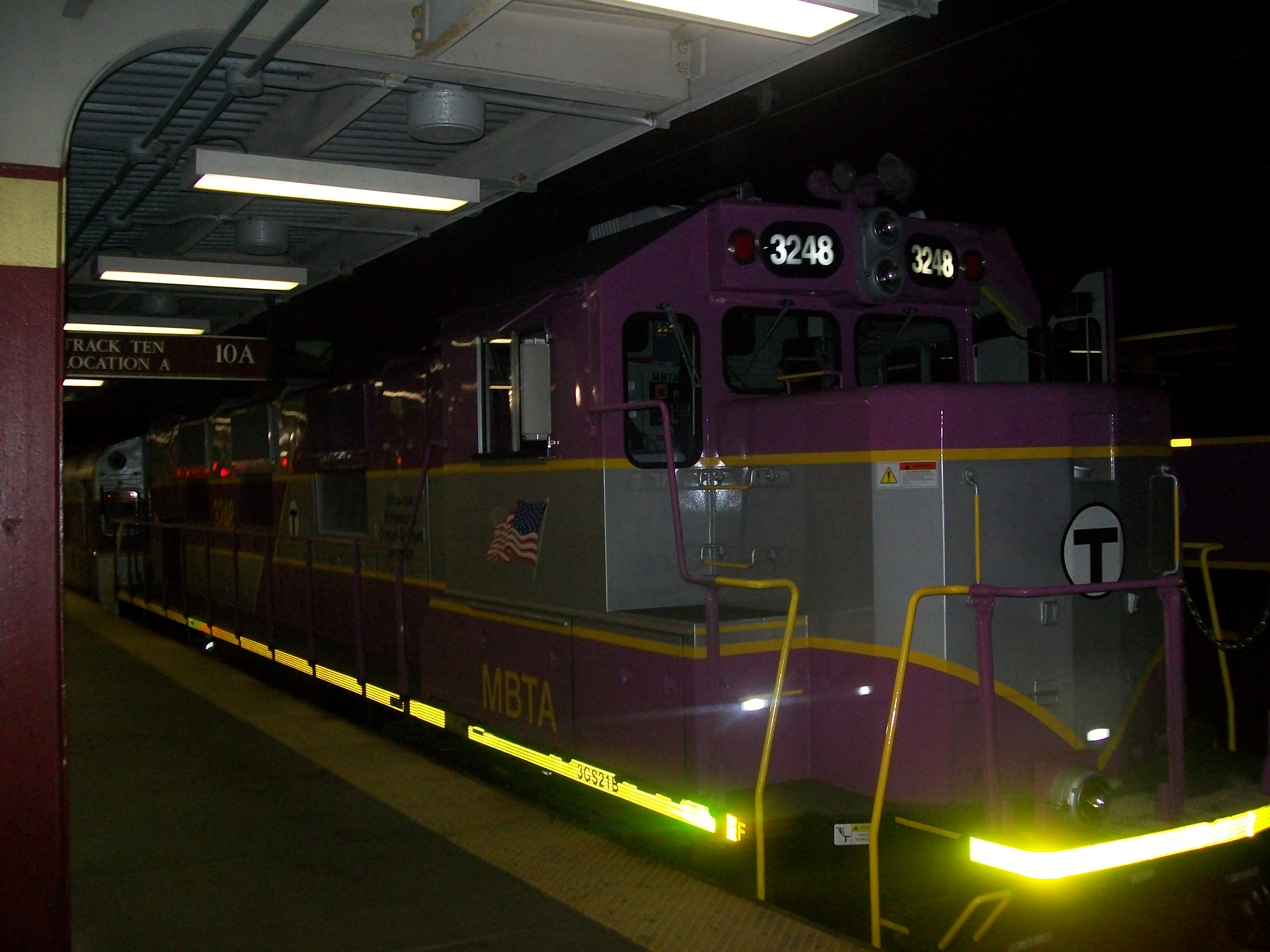
Brand new MBTA 3GS21B-DE at South Station.

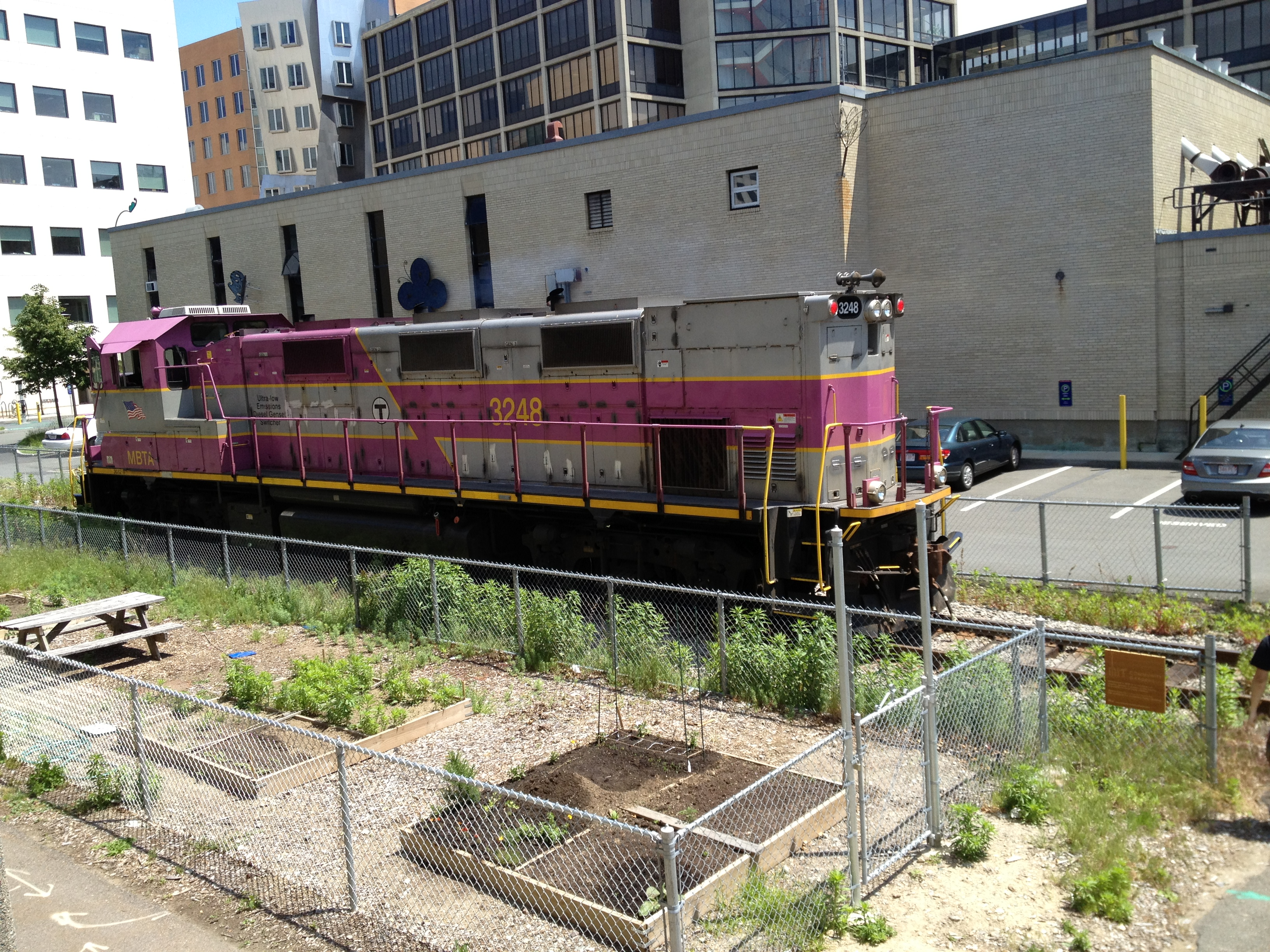
MBTA 3GS21B-DE on the Grand Junction Railroad.

== See also ==
- NRE 3GS21C
