= Genset locomotive =

A genset locomotive is a locomotive in which a number of smaller diesel engines are used rather than a single large engine. The term is short for "generator set."

== Aspects of gensets ==
A genset uses one to three small diesel engines to provide power. An operator is able to activate each engine as needed, with multi-engine gensets activating one for light work and more for heavier work, with excess engines turned off when the extra power is not needed.

=== Advantages ===
- More efficient design.
- Longer service life.
- Fuel savings.
- Ultra-low emissions.
- Improved wheel to rail adhesion capability.
- With multiple engine gensets, should one genset engine fail, the others can keep the train going, albeit at reduced speed.
- Removing a genset engine requires smaller size crane, while a larger crane is required to remove a traditional diesel prime mover.

=== Disadvantages ===
- More complex design.
- Greater capital cost.
- Greater deadweight.
- Greater number of moving parts.
- More engines, and the engines and generators do not use standard parts, reducing reliability.
- Multiple smaller truck type engines which lack the hardiness of a single large railroad type prime mover.
- Engineers do not like them because they are slow to get a cut of cars moving.

=== Table of produced gensets ===
Year	Country	Manufacturer	Model	HP	Engines	Axles	Gauge	Remark
2013	India	Banaras Locomotive Works	WDM-2G	2400 (3x800)		B-B	1676mm	
2006	United States	National Railway Equipment	NRE 3GS21B	2100 (3x700)	Cummins	B-B	1435mm	
2014	South Africa	Grindrod Locomotives		0710			1067mm 1000 mm	
2010	United States	Railserve Leaf		1200 (2x600)	Cummins; QSX15-L3	B-B	1435 mm	
201?	United States	MotivePower	MPI MP14B	1400 (2x700)	Cummins; QSK19C	B-B	1435 mm	
2007	United States	Railpower Technologies	Railpower RP14BD	1530 (2x765)	Deutz; BD2015	B-B	1435 mm	
2004	United States	Railpower Technologies	Railpower GG20B; Greengoat	300; 2000 using supplemental battery	Caterpillar C9	B-B	1435 mm	Large battery for extra power
201?	United States	Progress Rail	Progress Rail PR43C	4300 (1x3600 + 1x700)	Caterpillar; C175; C18	C-C	1435 mm	
20??	United States	Brookville	Brookville BL20CG	2100 (3x700)	Cummins	B-B	1435 mm	
20??	United States	National Railway Equipment	NRE 2GS16B-AU	1400 (2x700)	Cummins	B-B	1435 mm	
2013	Germany	Bombardier Transportation	Traxx; DE Multi-Engine	2880 (4x720)			1435 mm	

== See also ==
- NRE 3GS21B
- Glossary of North American railway terms: Genset
- Railpower GGS2000D - a one-off.
