= Brookville BL20CG =

Locomotive

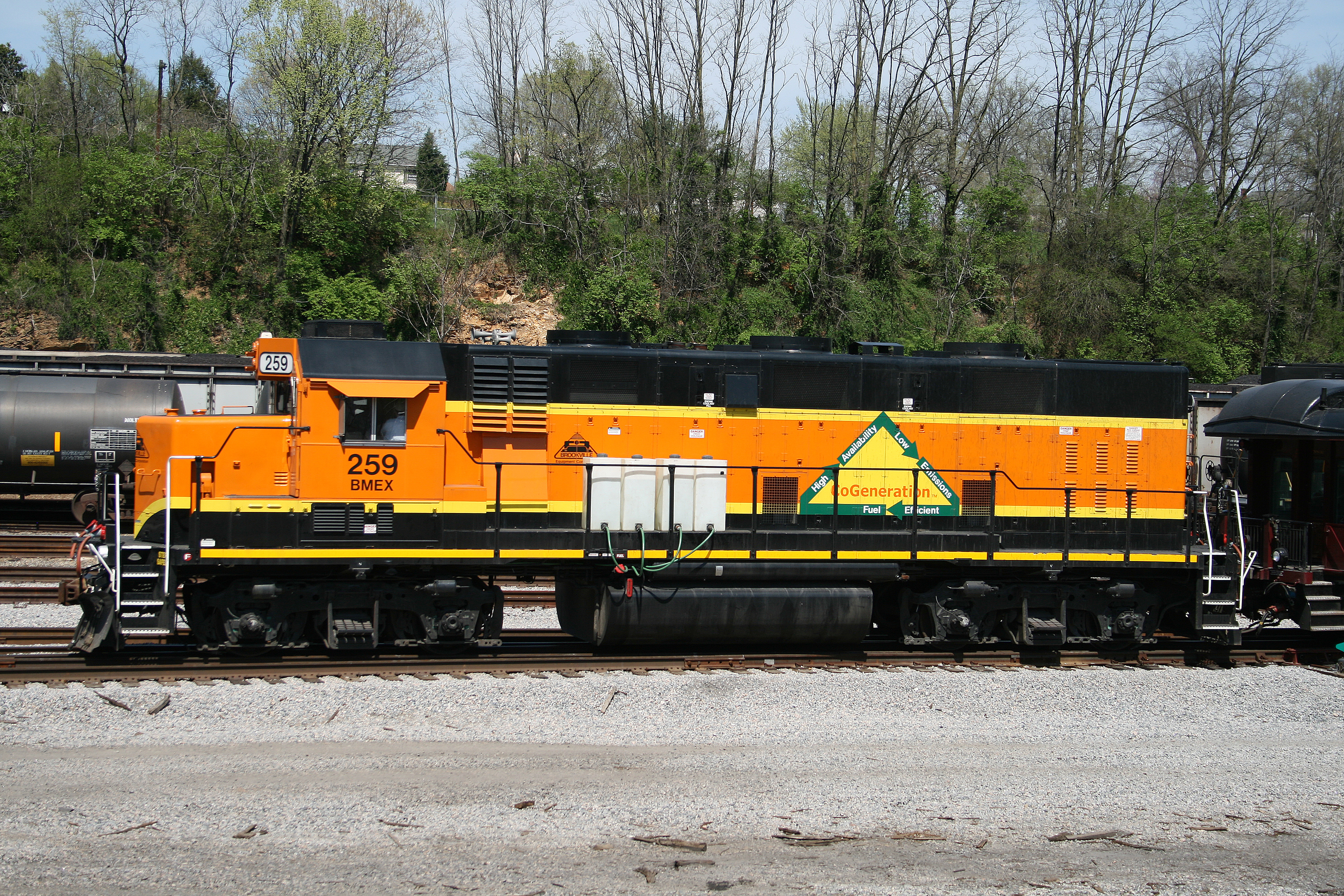
The original demonstrator, BMEX #259, in Roanoke, Virginia.

The Brookville BL20CG is a diesel electric low emissions locomotive built by the Brookville Equipment Corporation. It uses three Cummins QSK-19 engines, each rated at 700 horsepower (520 kW), for an aggregate of 2,100 horsepower (1,600 kW). The original BL20CG is a rebuilt EMD GP38 which formerly belonged to the Maine Central Railroad and is used by Brookville as a demonstrator.
