= Railpower GG20B =

Model of American battery-diesel-electric locomotive

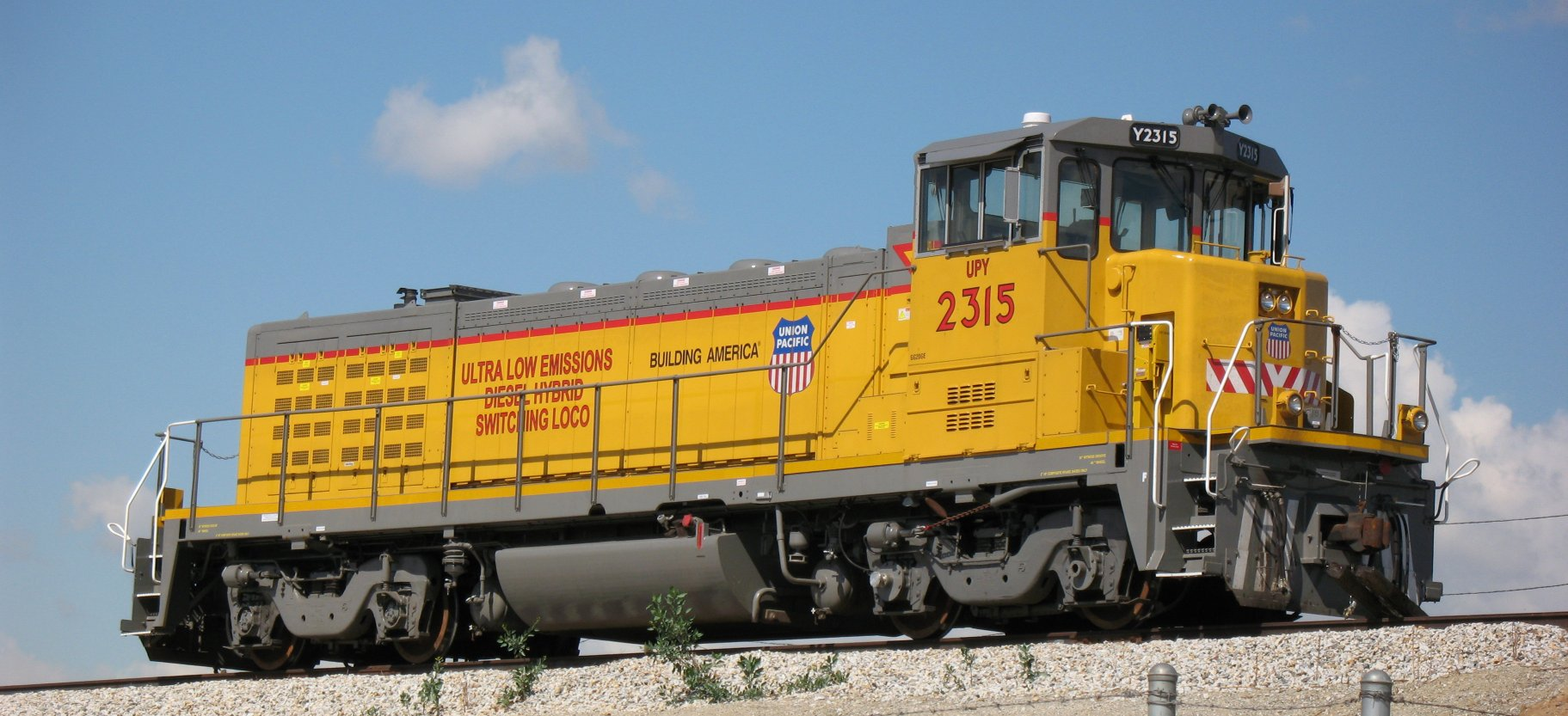
- A Railpower GG20B hybrid genset in the Union Pacific paint scheme
Type and origin
- Power type: Hybrid diesel/battery
- Builder: Railpower Technologies (RPT)
- Model: GG20B
- Build date: September 2004 – present
- Total produced: 55
Specifications
- Configuration
  - AAR: B-B
  - UIC: Bo'Bo'
- Gauge: 4 ft 8 1/2 in (1,435 mm) standard gauge
- Loco weight: 280,000 lb (130,000 kg)
- Fuel type: Diesel fuel
- Fuel capacity: 2,100 imp gal (9,500 L; 2,500 US gal)
- Prime mover: Caterpillar C9
- Engine type: Four-Stroke six cylinder inline diesel
- Aspiration: Turbocharger
- Cylinders: 6
Performance figures
- Maximum speed: 60 mph (97 km/h)
- Power output: 300 hp (224 kW); 2,000 hp (1,490 kW) Tractive Equivalent
- Tractive effort: 80,000 lbf (355.9 kN) Starting

The Railpower GG20B Green Goat is a low-emissions diesel hybrid switcher locomotive built by Railpower Technologies Corp. It is powered by a single Caterpillar C9 six cylinder inline engine developing 300 horsepower (224 kW), which is also connected to a large battery bank where both sources combine for a total power output of 2,000 horsepower (1,490 kW). To date, there have been more than 50 GG20B diesel-electric hybrid switchers manufactured since their first introduction in 2004.

Locomotives used for the rebuild
Locomotive	Former nos.	Model	Build date	Source	Notes
Willamette Valley Railroad 2890	SP 2890, SP 3273 (GP9), SP 5887 (GP9)	GP9	September 1959	Frame	

== Original Buyers ==
Railroad	Quantity	Road number(s)	Notes
Bechtel Group	1	2000	Now S&S Sales and Leasing SSRX 2000
BNSF Railway	4	1210-1213	1205 Ex-Canadian Pacific Railway
Canadian Pacific Railway	6	1700-1705	Railpower contract later terminated, units sent to different owners: Amtrak 599, BNSF Railway 1205
Kansas City Southern Railway	2	1868-1869	
Lubrizol Corporation	1	2006	
Modoc Railroad Academy	1	2608	Now S&S Sales and Leasing SSRX 2608
Railpower Technologies	5	2401-2405	Demonstration Units
Railserve	10	414, 1602, 1621, 1810, 2402, 2605, 4495, 4547, 8049, & 9140	Ordered with non-consistent running numbers
Union Pacific Railroad	21	Y2004 & Y2300-2319	Units classed by UP as "GG20GE"
United States Army	4	6000-6003	
Total	55		

== Fuel-cell testbed ==
BNSF Railway and Vehicle Projects converted a GG20B to an experimental testbed, for the use of hydrogen fuel cells. The new locomotive is designated HH20B. The locomotive was publicly demonstrated for the first time on June 29, 2009, at Topeka, Kansas.

The locomotive, BNSF 1205, was originally built in 1957 as Canadian Pacific 8637 (renumbered 1544 in the 1980s), a GMD GP9 locomotive. In 2006, it was rebuilt into a GG20B for the Canadian Pacific, but was not delivered, due to the cancellation of the order. It was sold to BNSF in 2008, and shipped to the railroad's shops at Topeka, Kansas for conversion. The diesel generator set was removed, and the fuel cell power unit was installed in its place. Hydrogen storage is in a set of tanks installed in a heavily vented enclosure on top of the locomotive's long hood, above the batteries. To date, it is the largest land vehicle on earth to be powered exclusively by hydrogen fuel cells.

In 2023, the locomotive (without its hydrogen components) was donated to the Oklahoma Railroad Museum, which plans on using it as a control car and for electricity generation on the end of its excursion trains.

== See also ==
External images
- RailPictures.Net Photographs of the Railpower GG20B at RailPictures.Net.
- Railroad Picture Archives Railpower GG20B photographs from Railroad Picture Archives.

- List of low emissions locomotives
