= EMD SD40-3 =

Diesel locomotive

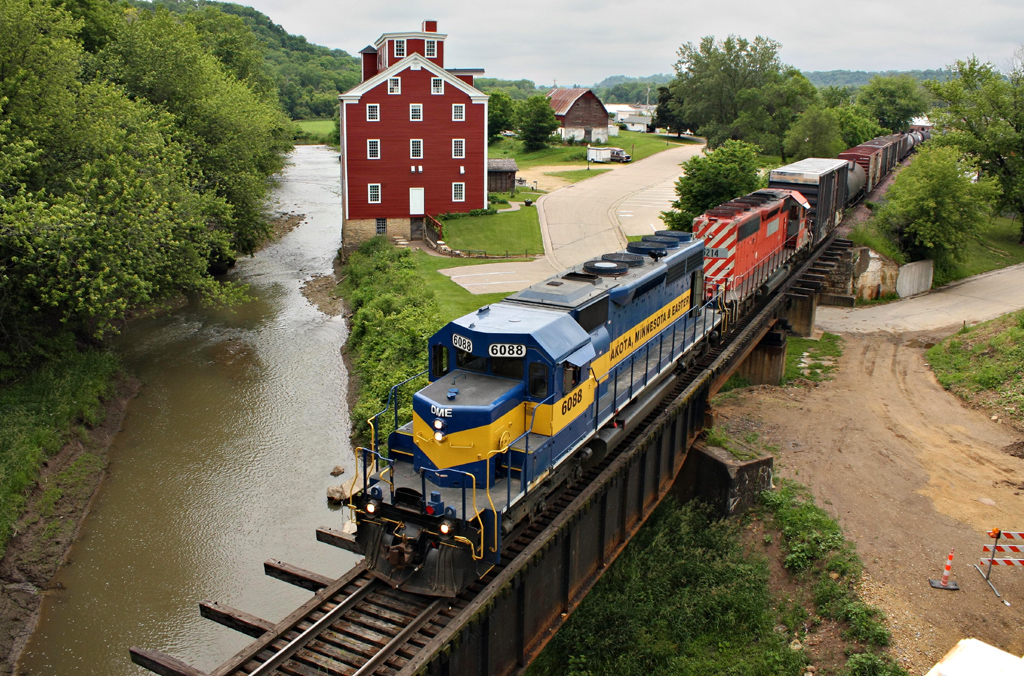
- Dakota, Minnesota and Eastern Railroad EMD SD40-3 #6088 at Bellevue, Iowa, United States on June 13, 2009
Type and origin
- Power type: Diesel–electric
- Builder: GM Electro-Motive Division (EMD); General Motors Diesel (GMD)
- Model: SD40-3
- Rebuilder: Multiple
- Rebuild date: 1998 - present
Specifications
- Configuration
  - AAR: C-C
  - UIC: Co′Co′
  - Commonwealth: Co-Co
- Gauge: 4 ft 8 1/2 in (1,435 mm)
- Trucks: HTC 6-Wheel
- Wheel diameter: 40 in (1,000 mm)
- Wheelbase: 13 ft 7 in (4.14 m) between axles in each truck
- Fuel type: Diesel
- Prime mover: EMD 16-645E3
- Engine type: V16 diesel engine
- Aspiration: turbocharged
- Traction motors: 6
- Cylinders: 16
- Cylinder size: 9.02 in (229 mm) x 10 in (250 mm)
- Gear ratio: 62:15
- MU working: Yes
- Train brakes: Westinghouse 26L (Air Brake)
Performance figures
- Maximum speed: 65 mph (105 km/h)
- Power output: 3,000 hp (2,200 kW)
- Tractive effort
  - Starting: 115,000 lbf (52,000 kgf) @ 31.5%
  - Continuous: 82,100 lbf (37,200 kgf) @ 11 mph (18 km/h)
Career
- Operators: Various
- Locale: North America
- Disposition: Most still in service

The EMD SD40-3 is a rebuild from several locomotive models from General Motors' Electro-Motive Division (EMD)'s second generation of diesel locomotives. The models involved in the rebuild were the SD40, SD40-2, SD45, SD45-2 and SD45T-2.

== History ==
=== Bessemer and Lake Erie Railroad (B&LE) ===
The Boise Locomotive Company (BLC), a subsidiary of MotivePower, would rebuild seven former Southern Pacific (SP) SD45T-2s into SD40-3s on September 30, 1999. The Duluth, Missabe and Iron Range Railway (DM&IR) would rebuild an additional four former SP SD45T-2s into SD40-3s at their own Proctor, Minnesota shops in 2000, making a total of eleven SD40-3s. All eleven locomotives of which would be delivered to the Bessemer and Lake Erie Railroad (B&LE).

=== CSX Transportation (CSXT) ===
CSX conducted their rebuilding of SD40-2s into SD40-3s at their own Huntington, West Virginia shops. Rebuilding began in 2010 with 10 units upgraded and numbered 4000-4009; in 2011, 20 units went through the program and were numbered 4010-4029 and in 2012 another 20 units followed and were numbered 4030-4049. One of the most notable rebuilds was SD40-2 no. 8888, (now rebuilt to no. 4389), which in 2001 was involved in a runaway incident caused by the failure of the engineer to notice the train gradually accelerating during yard switching, but this locomotive was rebuilt in 2015. These locomotives featured new cabs, air conditioning systems, and other new technologies.

=== Norfolk Southern (NS) ===
The Norfolk Southern Railway (NS) had started their SD40-3 rebuild program in October 2021, and as of 2026, is ongoing.

=== Wheeling and Lake Erie Railway (W&LE) ===
The Wheeling and Lake Erie Railway (W&LE) had one SD40, no. 3048, rebuilt into dash 3 specifications in December 1998 at their own Brewster, Ohio shops. It is currently still in service as of 2026.

== Accidents and incidents ==
- On September 30, 2010, DM&IR SD40-3 no. 401 was involved in a collision at Highland, Minnesota, it was scrapped on site.

== Rebuilders ==
Company	Quantity	Date	Former model(s)	Location	Number	Notes	Refs.
CSX Transportation (CSXT)	51	2010 - 2015	SD40-2	Huntington, West Virginia shops	4000-4049, 4387, 4389	4389 was formerly CSX 8888.	
National Railway Equipment Company (NREX)	8	1995	SD40-2	Silvis, Illinois shops	600-607	Sold and numbered for Kansas City Southern Railway (KCS)	
VMV Enterprises (VMVX)	28	1995 - 1996	SD40-2, SD45, SD40	Paducah, Kentucky	608-634, 672	Sold and numbered for Kansas City Southern Railway (KCS)	
VMV Enterprises (VMVX)	16	1996-1997	SD45T-2	Paducah, Kentucky	400-415	Sold to Duluth, Missabe and Iron Range Railway (DM&IR)	
VMV Enterprises (VMVX)	1	1996-1997	SD45-2	Paducah, Kentucky	416	Sold to Duluth, Missabe and Iron Range Railway (DM&IR)	
VMV Enterprises (VMVX)	1	1996-1997	SD45T-2	Paducah, Kentucky	417	Sold to Duluth, Missabe and Iron Range Railway (DM&IR)	
VMV Enterprises (VMVX)	1	1996-1997	SD45-2	Paducah, Kentucky	418	Sold to Duluth, Missabe and Iron Range Railway (DM&IR)	
VMV Enterprises (VMVX)	1	1996-1997	SD45T-2	Paducah, Kentucky	419	Sold to Duluth, Missabe and Iron Range Railway (DM&IR)	
Ateliers de Montréal Facilities (AMF)	1	1996	SD40	-	697	Sold and numbered for Kansas City Southern Railway (KCS)	
Ateliers de Montréal Facilities (AMF)	12	1997	SD40	-	6047-6048, 6050-6052, 6055-6056, 6061-6062, 6076-6078	Rebuilt for Connell Leasing	
Alstom Canada Transportation (GCFX)	4	1998	SD40	-	6617-6618, 6629, 6632	Rebuilt and repainted for KCS, leased to CN	
Wheeling and Lake Erie Railway (W&LE)	1	December 1998	SD40	Brewster, Ohio shops	3048		
Boise Locomotive Company (BLC)	7	September 30, 1999	SD45T-2	Boise, Idaho	900-906	Sold to the Bessemer and Lake Erie Railroad (B&LE)	
Duluth, Missabe and Iron Range Railway (DM&IR)	4	2000	SD45T-2	Proctor, Minnesota	907-910	Sold to the Bessemer and Lake Erie Railroad (B&LE)	
Norfolk Southern Railway (NS)	55	October 2021 - present	SD40-2	Juniata Shops	6400-6454		
Metro East Industries (MEI)	2	April 2026	SD40-2	-	4091 and 4092	Rebuilt with new cabs	

== Bibliography ==
- Solomon, Brian (2012-12-15). North American Locomotives: A Railroad-by-Railroad Photohistory. Voyageur Press. ISBN 978-1-61058-685-6.
