= EMD SD30C-ECO =

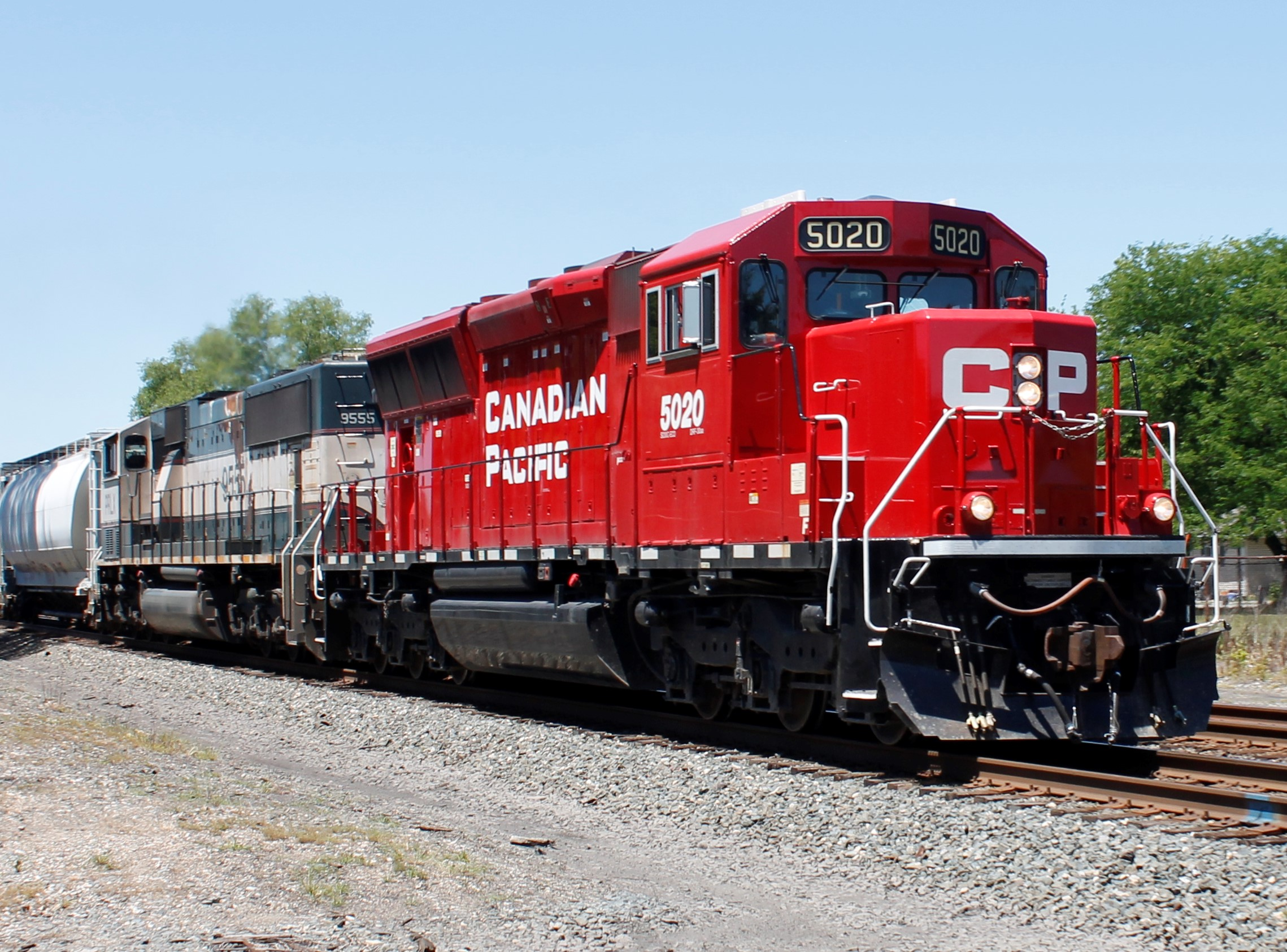
- Canadian Pacific 5020 at Chesterton, Indiana
Type and origin
- Power type: Diesel-electric
- Builder: Electro-Motive Diesel
- Model: SD30C-ECO, SD40E3 (CSX)
- Build date: 2013-2017
- Total produced: 63
Specifications
- Configuration
  - AAR: C–C
  - UIC: Co′Co′
- Gauge: 4 ft 8 1/2 in (1,435 mm)
- Prime mover: EMD 12-710G3
- Engine type: V12 diesel engine
- Aspiration: turbocharged
- Displacement: 710 cubic inches (11.6 liters) per cylinder
- Cylinders: 12
Performance figures
- Power output: 3,000 hp (2,240 kW)
Career
- Numbers: 5000–5049 (CP), 1700-1712 (CSX)
- Locale: North America
- Current owner: Canadian Pacific Railway, CSX Transportation

The EMD SD30C-ECO is a 3,000-horsepower (2,200 kW) C-C diesel-electric locomotive built by EMD. Although similar to the EMD SD32ECO, the SD30C-ECO follows the Canadian Pacific Railway's request for crashworthiness and EPA emission standards with the "C" in the designation denoting crashworthiness of the cab, frame, and fuel tank. CP Rail requested relaxed emission standards (Tier 0+ instead of Tier 2) to cut costs.

Cores for the locomotives come from CP's fleet of EMD SD40-2s. The frames, trucks, and internal components are reused while a new (standard) cab, designed and constructed by EMD, and a fuel tank is built new for each unit. With the increased emissions requirements, the locomotives feature flared radiators similar to those on the EMD SD45 to house additional cooling equipment. The locomotives have a snoot nose to house additional electronics, and all lighting with the exception of the headlights and ditch lights are LED.

== Owners ==
A total of 50 SD30C-ECOs have been built for Canadian Pacific in 2 orders. The first order was for 20 locomotives numbered 5000-5019 and the second order was for an additional 30 locomotives numbered 5020-5049. On August 28, 2021, CP 5028 had been involved in a derailment near New Hampton, Iowa and scrapped on site.

A similar rebuild, classed as SD40E3 was carried out by CSX in early 2017. 13 units were produced, numbered 1700-1712.
