= EMD GP22ECO =

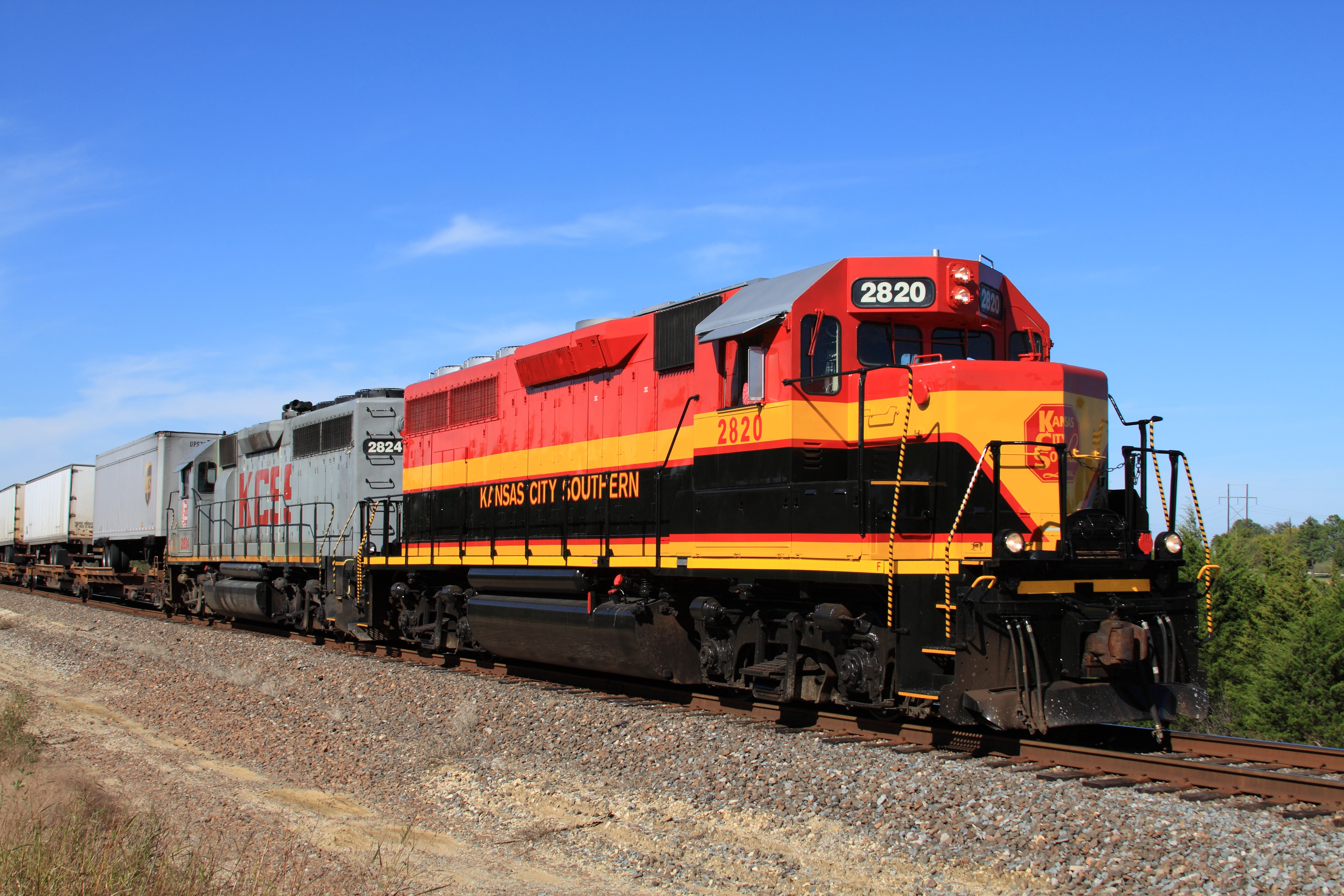
- KCS #2820 post-rebuild with a "Retro Belle" paint job
Type and origin
- Power type: Diesel-electric
- Builder: Electro-Motive Diesel (EMD)
- Rebuild date: 2008 - 2013
Specifications
- Configuration
  - AAR: B-B
  - UIC: Bo'Bo'
- Gauge: 4 ft 8 1/2 in (1,435 mm)
- Prime mover: EMD 8–710G3A–T2
- Cylinders: V8
- Transmission: Diesel-electric
Performance figures
- Power output: 2,150 hp (1,600 kW)
Career
- Operators: Norfolk Southern, Union Pacific Railroad, Kansas City Southern Railway
- Disposition: Several still in service

The EMD GP22ECO is a 2,150 hp (1,600 kW) B-B diesel-electric locomotive rebuilt by Electro-Motive Diesel and Norfolk Southern's Juniata Shops. Initially EMD built two GP22ECO demonstrators, one based on a GP9 and one based on a GP40, but thus far all orders have been for conversions based on EMD GP40 and EMD GP40-2 series locomotives. The rebuild involves replacing the existing prime mover with an EPA Tier-II-compliant turbocharged V8 710G3A, with Electronic fuel injection. The prime mover is mated to an AR10 alternator for traction power, a CA6 alternator for control power, and a computerized control system. Applying this to a 6-axle locomotive results in a SD22ECO. Some 6-axle locomotives could alternately be converted into a SD32ECO, using a 3,150 hp (2,350 kW) V12 instead.

When applied to GP40 or GP40-2 series locomotives, this conversion does not alter the external appearance of the locomotive, although the conversion of the GP9-based demonstrator required extensive changes to the long hood. The GP22ECO offers customers a 'factory' upgrade of existing locomotives.

Norfolk Southern's units were rebuilt from GP38AC units. They also feature electrical, mechanical, and emissions improvements.
