= EMD SD75 series =

Model of North American six-axle diesel-electric locomotives built by GM-EMD

- Canadian National SD75I no. 5718
Type and origin
- Power type: Diesel-electric
- Builder: General Motors Electro-Motive Division (EMD)
- Model: SD75
- Build date: 1994 – 1996
- Total produced: 283 (76 SD75M, 207 SD75I)
Specifications
- Configuration
  - AAR: C-C
  - Commonwealth: Co-Co
- Gauge: 4 ft 8 1/2 in (1,435 mm)
- Fuel type: Diesel
- Prime mover: EMD 16-710G3
- Cylinders: 16
- Transmission: diesel electric
Performance figures
- Power output: 4,300 horsepower (3,200 kW)
Career
- Operators: Burlington Northern Santa Fe, Canadian National
- Numbers: BNSF 200–201, 203–208, 210–217, 219–221, 223–224, 226–228, 231–275, renumbered from 8200–8275. NS 2800–2806.
- Disposition: Some still in service as of 2026, CN fleet being rebuilt as SD75IACCs; NS units retired

The EMD SD75 is a series of diesel-electric locomotives produced by General Motors Electro-Motive Division between 1994 and 1996. The series is an improvement and extension to the EMD SD70 series, which further is an extension to the EMD SD60. These locomotives shared its microprocessor with the EMD SD70 & SD60.

These locomotives were built as a response to General Electric's Dash 9-44CW. By increasing the output of the 16-710-G3 engine from 4,000 to 4,300 horsepower (3,000 to 3,200 kW), the SD75 was a reality. The "M" in the model designation is the style of the cab, in this case the North American style cab.

== SD75M ==
The SD75M is a diesel-electric locomotive built by GM-EMD. It is a further extension to the 70's series, but can be distinguishable from the SD70M by the bulge below the inertial air-intake on the right side of the unit. But, however, it was not successful, as it sold only 76 units. Buyers were Santa Fe Railway and BNSF Railway. Soon, Progress Rail (PRLX) acquired three Santa Fe SD75M locomotives. PRLX locomotives are distinguishable by the original railroad's name being hidden by black patches, on both sides and the nose. PRLX was written on both the sides on the patches.

== SD75I ==
The SD75I has an isolated cab in EMD's range. This is indicated by the "I" designation, which means that it has an "Isolated Cab", or a "WhisperCab" in EMD speak, which reduces noise and vibration in the cab. This type of cab is recognized by a seam separating the nose and cab components, similar to the SD70I and SD60I. This seam is the rubber that damps vibration and cuts down on noise, because the cab is not attached directly to the frame on the unit. Models like the SD60I, SD70I, etc. used the "I" designation. This was the last model that used the "I" designation in the model name; all further units had the isolated cab, but the model designation continued to use the "M". Buyers included Canadian National, the largest buyer with 175 units (now 173), Burlington Northern Santa Fe with 26, and Ontario Northland Railway with 6.

== SD75IACC ==
The SD75IACC is a rebuild of Canadian National's SD75I's by Progress Rail, and entered service in July 2024. These replace the DC traction system with an AC traction system. The program started in 2023 and is ongoing as of 2026.

In December 2025, No. 8357 was painted to promote the 988 Suicide and Crisis Lifeline to honor suicide prevention.

== Other ==
Both models use the HTCR radial truck and are mounted on the 72-foot-4-inch (22.05 m) frame. The M model sold only 76 units and was not as popular as the SD70I. The biggest buyer of this model was the Atchison, Topeka and Santa Fe Railway, now Burlington Northern Santa Fe, with 51 units; an additional 25 were delivered in early 1996, during the merger process. The Santa Fe's SD75Ms were the railroad's last new locomotives, with the last new unit, number 250, built in August 1995. PRLX then acquired 3 consecutive Santa Fe SD75M's, numbered 231, 232, and 249.

Mainly built for a special request from Santa Fe/BNSF, the SD75Ms are slightly more powerful than SD70Ms, having horsepower ratings between 4,300 hp (3,200 kW) & 4,500 hp.

In September 2014, Norfolk Southern purchased 7 SD75Ms via National Railway Equipment Company. They were retired by 2020.

== Operators ==
Image	Railroad	Qty.	Road numbers	Notes
EMD SD75M
	Atchison, Topeka and Santa Fe Railway	51	200–250	To BNSF 8200–8250, then back to 200–250. Units 202, 209, 218, 222, 225, 229, and 230 to Norfolk Southern 2800–2806. Rest sold to PRLX, 227 kept by BNSF but sold to Birmingham Rail in 2023 for scrap.
	BNSF Railway	25	8251–8275	Renumbered to 251–275.
	Progress Rail	45	200-201, 203-209, 210-217, 219-221, 223-224, 226, 228, 231, 232-250, 257	Ex-BNSF
EMD SD75I
	BNSF Railway	26	8276–8301	8276–8299 renumbered to 276–299, 8300–8301 renumbered to 249–250
	Canadian National Railway	175	5626–5800	All units to be rebuilt as SD75IACCs. CN 5637, 5658, 5717 & 5753 were wrecked and retired.
	Ontario Northland Railway	6	2100–2105	Unit 2100 was wrecked and retired in 2012.
EMD SD75IACC
	Canadian National Railway	62	8300-8361	Rebuilt from SD75Is, no. 8357 painted to promote the 988 hotline
