= EMD SD40-2 =

North American diesel–electric locomotive class

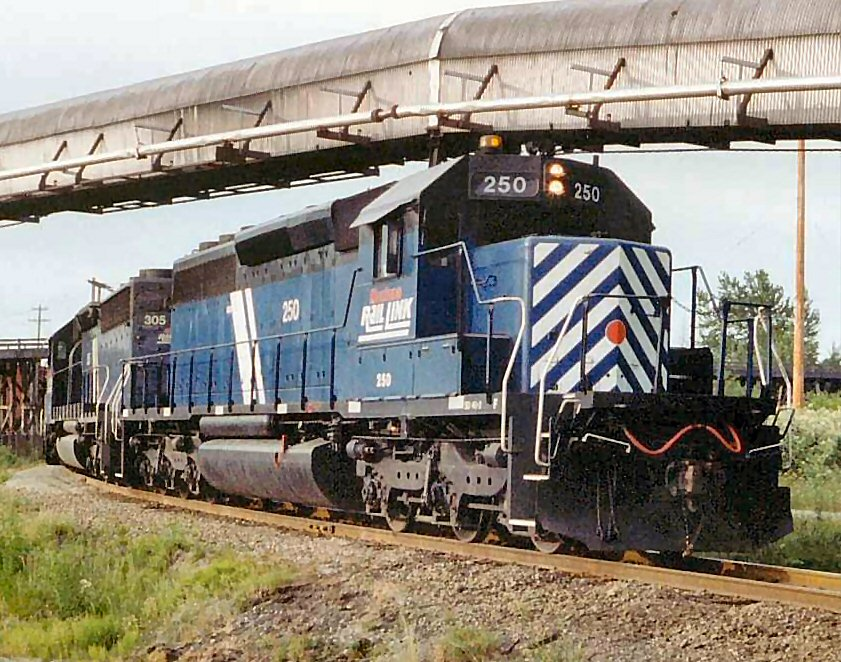
- Montana Rail Link EMD SD40-2 diesel locomotive 250 at Everett, Washington, United States, January 1994
Type and origin
- Power type: Diesel–electric
- Builder: GM Electro-Motive Division (EMD); General Motors Diesel (GMD); Material y Construcciones S.A. (MACOSA); Equipamentos Villares S.A. (EVSA)
- Model: SD40-2
- Build date: January 1972 – October 1989; January 1997 (SDL40-2)
- Total produced: 4,036
Specifications
- Configuration
  - AAR: C-C
  - UIC: Co′Co′
  - Commonwealth: Co-Co
- Gauge: 4 ft 8 1/2 in (1,435 mm); 5 ft 3 in (1,600 mm), Brazil; 1,000 mm (3 ft 3 3/8 in), Guinea and Brazil
- Trucks: HTC 6-Wheel
- Wheel diameter: 40 in (1,000 mm)
- Minimum curve: 30°
- Wheelbase: 13 ft 7 in (4.14 m) between axles in each truck
- Pivot centres: 43 ft 6 in (13.26 m) between bolsters
- Length
  - Over couplers: 68 ft 10 in (20.98 m)
- Width: 10 ft 3 1/8 in (3.127 m) over the grabirons
- Height: 15 ft 7 1/8 in (4.753 m)
- Loco weight: 368,000 lb (167,000 kg) or 184 short tons (164 long tons; 167 t)
- Fuel type: Diesel
- Fuel capacity: 3,200–4,000 US gal (12,000–15,000 L; 2,700–3,300 imp gal)
- Lubricant cap.: 395 US gal (1,500 L; 329 imp gal)
- Coolant cap.: 275 US gal (1,040 L; 229 imp gal)
- Sandbox cap.: 56 ft^{3} (1,600 L)
- Prime mover: EMD 16-645E3
- RPM
  - RPM idle: 318
  - Maximum RPM: 904
- Engine type: V16 diesel engine
- Aspiration: turbocharged
- Alternator: GMD14
- Generator: Main: AR10; Auxilary: Delco A8102
- Traction motors: 6
- Cylinders: 16
- Cylinder size: 9.02 in (229 mm) x 10 in (250 mm)
- Gear ratio: 62:15
- MU working: Yes
- Train brakes: Westinghouse 26L (Air Brake)
Performance figures
- Maximum speed: 65 mph (105 km/h)
- Power output: 3,000 hp (2,200 kW)
- Tractive effort
  - Starting: 115,000 lbf (52,000 kgf) @ 31.5%
  - Continuous: 82,100 lbf (37,200 kgf) @ 11 mph (18 km/h)
Career
- Operators: Various
- Locale: North America, Brazil, Guinea, Mauritania

The EMD SD40-2 is a 3,000-horsepower (2,200 kW) C-C diesel–electric locomotive built by EMD from 1972 to 1997.

The SD40-2 was introduced in January 1972 as part of EMD's Dash 2 series, competing against the GE U30C. Although higher-horsepower locomotives were available, including EMD's own SD45-2, the reliability and versatility of the 3,000-horsepower (2,200 kW) SD40-2 made it one of the best-selling models in EMD's history, edged out only by the GP9, and was the standard of the industry for several decades after its introduction. The SD40-2 was an improvement over the SD40, with modular electronic control systems similar to those of the experimental DDA40X.

Peak production of the SD40-2 was in the mid-1970s. Sales of the SD40-2 began to diminish after 1981 due to the oil crisis, increased competition from GE's Dash-7 series and the introduction of the EMD SD50, which was available concurrently to late SD40-2 production. The last SD40-2 delivered to a United States railroad was built in July 1984, with production continuing for railroads in Canada until 1988, Mexico until February 1986, and Brazil until October 1989. The last SD40-2 built was a SDL40-2 made for export to Mauritania in 1997. A total of 4,036 units were known to have been produced.

To suit export country specifications, General Motors designed a number of SD40 variants, including the JT26CW-SS (British Rail Class 59) for Great Britain, the GT26CW-2 for Yugoslavia, South Korea, Iran, Morocco, Peru and Pakistan, the GT26CU-2 for to Zimbabwe and Brazil, the GT26HCW-2 for Algeria, and the SDL40-2 for Mauritania.

== Appearance ==
As the SD38, SD39, SD40, and SD45 shared a common frame, so too did the SD38-2, SD40-2, and SD45-2. It was 3 ft (0.91 m) longer than the previous models, giving a length of 68 ft 10 in (20.98 m) over the coupler pulling faces. The SD38-2 and SD40-2 shared the same basic superstructure, since they used the same 16-645 engine (in Roots-blown and turbocharged form respectively); the long hood was 18 inches (457 mm) longer than the SD38 and SD40, but since the increase in frame length was even greater, the SD38-2 and SD40-2 had even larger front and rear "porches" than the earlier models. These empty areas at front and rear are spotting features to identify the Dash 2 models of both units. The SD40-2 can be distinguished from the SD38-2 by its three roof-mounted radiator fans instead of two, and a single large exhaust stack instead of two smaller stacks.

The increase in the frame length between the preceding 40 Series and the 40-2 Series six-axle locomotives was made to accommodate the new HT-C truck design, in which the traction motors all face the same direction, making the trucks longer. After a series of derailments involving Amtrak SDP40F units that were equipped with "hollow bolster" HT-C trucks, applied only to the SDP40F, Conrail ordered the SD40-2 units and several orders of SD50s with the older Flexicoil trucks, but the HT-C truck was vindicated and it ultimately went under most 40 Series, 50 Series and 60 Series six-axle locomotives, and this truck is still found under many remanufactured locomotives.

Some SD45 and SD45-2 units have been modified by replacing their 20-cylinder engine with the 16-cylinder removed from scrapped SD40-2 units; this was common on Union Pacific and possibly other railroads. In many cases these are identified by the owner as SD40-3, SD40M-2 or some such. Confusingly, what appears to be an SD45 is labeled as an SD40-2. Older SD40-2 units used in low-power modes such as yard switching or hump service have been de-turbocharged, resulting in the mechanical equivalent of a SD38-2. Units so modified may or may not be re-labeled.

There are several variations of the SD40-2 such as the SD40T-2s (Informally: T for tunnel motor; the actual EMD designation is "SD40-2 With Cooling System Modification", as stated on this model's EMD manuals) bought by the former Southern Pacific, and Denver and Rio Grande Western railroads; now operated by Union Pacific. The SD45 tunnel motor equivalent, the SD45T-2 model, was also utilized by Southern Pacific. Many tunnel motors were rebuilt and sold second-hand to a handful of American shortlines including, Bessemer and Lake Erie, Illinois Railway and Missouri and Northern Arkansas, as well as Canadian shortline Goderich-Exeter Railway. There is the SD40-2W (W for the 4-Window Safety Cab) bought and operated by the Canadian National railway. High-nosed versions of the SD40-2 were bought by Norfolk & Western, & Southern Railway. These units are now operated by the Norfolk Southern Railway (Resulting merger of N&W and Southern Railway). A narrow gauge version produced for Ferrovia Central Atlantico in Brazil is the BB40-2.

Three cabless "SD40-2B"s were also created from standard SD40-2s by the Burlington Northern Railroad in the early 1980s. The units had been in collisions and BN decided that it was more economical to rebuild them without cabs. Canadian Pacific also created several cobbled "SD40-2Bs" by created by welding metal plates over the cab windows of many of its ex-Norfolk Southern and some of its original SD40-2s.

SD40-2 production variations

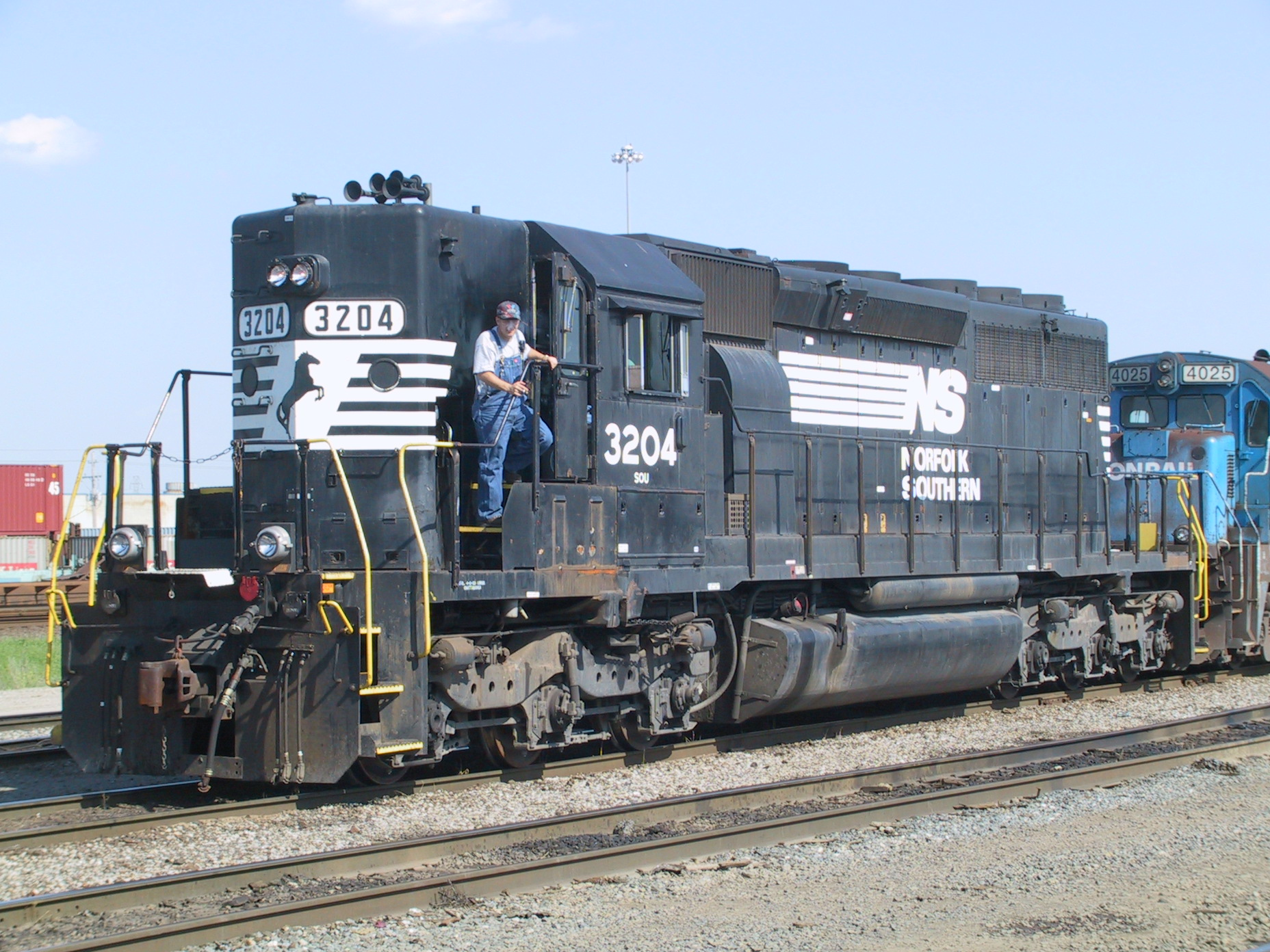
NS 3204, an example of a SD40-2 built with a high short hood

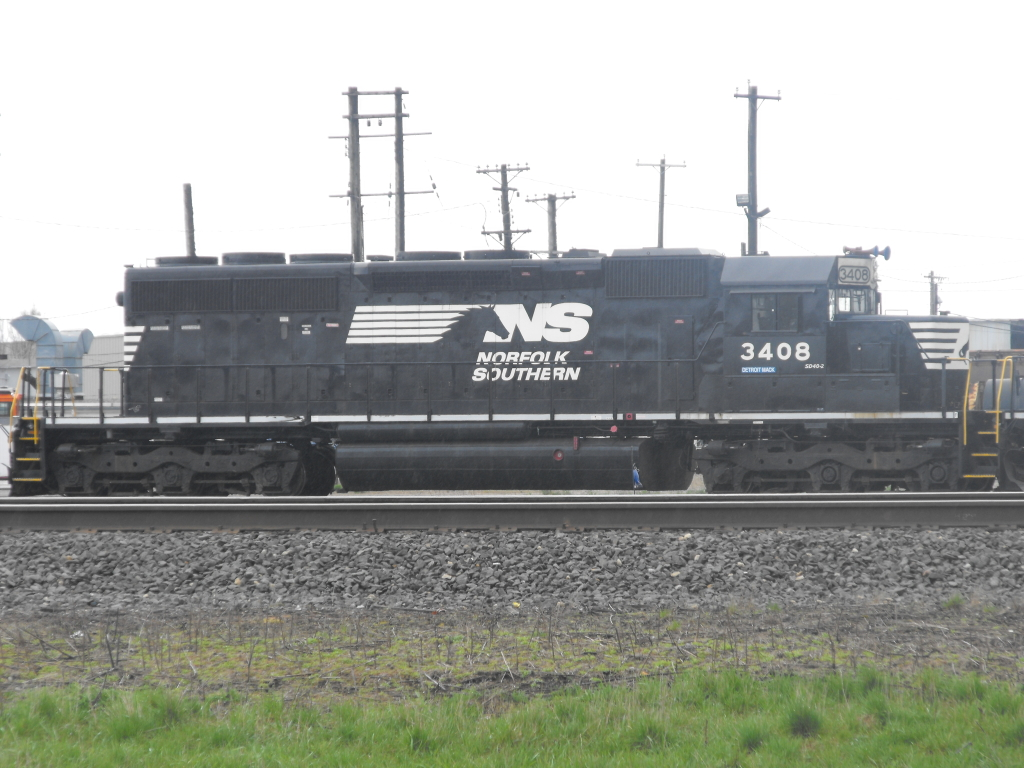
NS 3408, which rides on Flexicoil C trucks

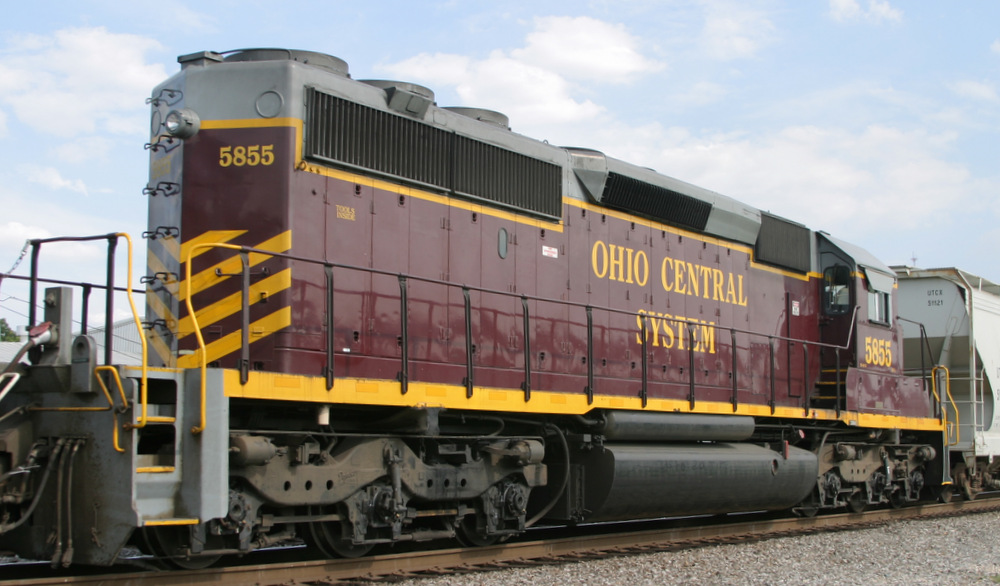
Ohio Central Railroad System 5855 was built with an extended rear deck

== Additional specifications ==
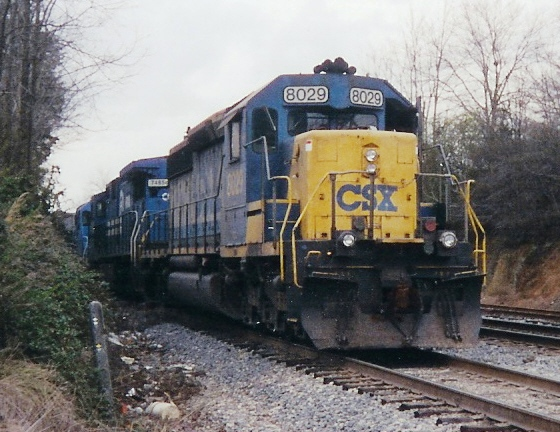
A CSXT SD40-2 waiting in Tunnel Hill, Georgia

Engine Builder:	EMD
Engine:	645E3 16 cylinder
Bore & Stroke:	9.02 in (229 mm) x 10 in (250 mm)
RPM (Maximum / Minimum):	904 / 318
Main generator:	AR10 alternator
Horsepower:	3,000
Standard gearing:	62:15
Maximum speed with 62:15 gearing:	65 mph (105 km/h)
Trucks:	HTC 6-Wheel
Configuration:	C-C
Traction Motor Blowers:	Electrical Drive (4)
Model:	D77
Weight:	368,000 lb (167,000 kilograms)
Traction motors:	6 × D77/78 DC
Tractive Effort (starting):	115,000 lbf (52,000 kgf) @ 31.5%
Tractive Effort (continuous):	82,100 lbf (37,200 kgf) @ 11 mph (18 km/h)
Continuous TE with 62:15 gearing:	83100 lb
Multiple Unit Capability:	Yes
Dynamic Braking:	Yes
Auxilary Generator:	Delco A8102
Alternator:	GMD14
Air Brake:	Westinghouse
Model:	26L
Compressor:	Gardner-Denver
Model:	WBO
Quantity Built:	4,031
Dates:	January 1972 – October 1989
Exterior Dimensions:	SD40-2
Total Length:	68 ft 10 in (20.98 m)
Wheel Diameter:	40 in (1,000 mm)
Truck Wheel Base:	13 ft 7 in (4.14 m)
Height to Top Engine Hood:	15 ft 1.2 in (4.602 m)
Height to Top Cab:	14 ft 8.7 in (4.488 m)
Cab Width:	10 ft 0 in (3.05 m)
Top of Walkway:	??
Engine Hood Width:	7 ft 0 in (2.13 m)
Distance between truck centers:	40 ft 0 in (12.19 m)
Locomotive Wheel Base:	53 ft 7 in (16.33 m)
Minimum Turning Radius:	30°
Fuel Oil:	3,200–4,000 US gal (12,000–15,000 L; 2,700–3,300 imp gal)
Lubricating Oil:	395 US gal (1,500 L; 329 imp gal)
Engine Cooling Water:	275 US gal (1,040 L; 229 imp gal)
Sand Capacity:	56 ft^{3} (1,600 L)

== Original owners ==
American SD40-2 orders
Photograph	Railroad	Quantity	Road numbers	Notes
	Atchison, Topeka and Santa Fe Railway	187	5020-5192, 5200-5213	Almost all in service with BNSF Railway, BNSF 6351 (formerly 5036) was wrecked and scrapped at Gunter, Texas in 2004.
	Burlington Northern Railroad	769	6325–6385, 6700–6799, 6824−6836, 6917–6928, 6950, 7000–7291, 7832–7940, 8000–8181	Most now in service with BNSF Railway and leasing firms, BNSF 6789 and 7138 were retired after a serious accident near Gunter, Texas in 2004, 7167-7205, 7206-7235, & 8074-8089 were the only SD40-2s built by General Motors Diesel as exports to the United States, when EMD LaGrange IL plant was overloaded with orders. EMD sent the three orders to GMD London, Ontario. Burlington Northern 7149 and 7890 were LNG test units modified by energy conversions. Several units were wrecked, sold, retired, or scrapped before merger with Atchison, Topeka and Santa Fe Railway.
	Chicago Burlington and Quincy (Colorado and Southern Railway)	60	900-925, 930−961, 980, 996	All units were later renumbered to 6348-6373 6850-6950, and later sold to Burlington Northern. Most now in service with BNSF Railway.
	Baltimore and Ohio Railroad (Chessie System)	20	7600–7619	Now in service with CSX Transportation
	Chicago and North Western Railway	135	6801–6935	Most now in service with Union Pacific Railroad, No. 6847 was donated and restored at the Illinois Railway Museum.
	Conrail	167	6358–6524	Equipped with flexicoil trucks. Now renumbered and in service with CSX, Norfolk Southern, or leasing firms
	Clinchfield Railroad	5	8127–8129, 8131–8132	Units were delivered in Family Lines Paint, to Seaboard System, now in service with CSX Transportation
	Illinois Central Gulf Railroad	4	6030-6033	6031 was converted into 6200, 6033 was destroyed in a collision in Flora, Mississippi on February 6, 1994
	Kansas City Southern Railway	46	637–692	637 was the very first SD40-2 constructed in January 1972; 677-690 were built with extended "snoot" noses. Many are now in service with Canadian Pacific Kansas City.
	Louisville and Nashville Railroad	191	1259–1278, 3554–3613, 8000–8039, 8067–8086, 8095–8126, 8133–8162	8000s units delivered in Family Lines Paint; all to Seaboard System, now in service with CSX Transportation.
	Milwaukee Road	90	21–30, 171–209, 3000–3040	Now in service among several various railroads.
	Missouri–Kansas–Texas Railroad	37	600–636	Most are now in service with Union Pacific Railroad. Order based on Burlington Northern specifications for Pooling Service.
	Missouri Pacific Railroad	306	790–838, 3139–3321, 6020–6073	Most are now in service with Union Pacific Railroad. 790–838 & 3139–3321 lack dynamic brakes. 6020–6073 were based on Burlington Northern specifications for Pooling Services. Considered the heaviest SD40-2s ever built.
	Oneida and Western Railroad	8	9950–9957	Not an actual railroad - Order based on Louisville & Nashville specifications. Later became BC Rail 743-750, 749 is now GECX 749.
	Kennecott Utah Copper Corporation	7	101–107	Delivered with shorter 2,600 gallon fuel tanks and an additional third air reservoir for heavy ore drag operations. Units were retired in 1984 and put under leasing firms. Later became BC Rail 736-742 in 1986. Six units were sold in 1996 and are now HLCX 6204-6210.
	Chicago, Rock Island and Pacific Railroad	10	4790–4799	Delivered without dynamic brakes. Later became Illinois Central Gulf 6040-6049. Rebuilt with dynamic brakes by EMD. Six are in service with the Wisconsin and Southern Railroad.
	Seaboard Coast Line Railroad	64	8040–8066, 8087–8094, 8133−8161	Delivered in Family Lines Paint, to Seaboard System, now in service with CSX Transportation.
	St. Louis–San Francisco Railway	8	950–957	Merged with Burlington Northern in 1980, renumbered BN 6840-6847 - same numbers in BNSF. Now in service with the BNSF Railway.
	Soo Line Railroad	57	757–789, 6600–6623	Most are now in service with Canadian Pacific Kansas City, 6623 is the last SD40-2 built in the United States.
	Norfolk and Western Railway	163	1625–1652, 6073–6207	1625-1635 were delivered with high short hoods; many are still in service with Norfolk Southern. 1637 was damaged beyond repair in a collision in Sandersville, Georgia in 2015 and was later scrapped. 1648 was wrecked and rebuilt to SD40-3 6446 after a sideswipe in 2024. 1633 was rebuilt into RPU6D 895 in 2017.
	Southern Railway	128	3201–3328	All orders were high hoods. Some sold to Canadian Pacific and converted into B-units. Many are now in service with Norfolk Southern. Many have been rebuilt in 2012-2016 with low short hood 'Admiral' cabs except units 3227 and 3284, which were rebuilt with EMDs spartan cab. Unit 3259 sold to GECX and rebuilt to ET23DCM demo unit.
	Union Pacific Railroad	686	3123–3239, 3243–3304, 3335–3399, 3410–3583, 3609–3808, 8000–8002, 8035–8099	Several have been renumbered and others retired to leasers. 3200–3410 delivered with snoot noses. 3105 donated to RailGiants Train Museum along with a boxcar and a bay-window caboose and now sits on UP 4014's former spot.
	Southern Pacific Railroad	229	8230–8299, 8300–8329, 8327–8341, 8350–8371, 8377–8391, 8489–8573	Model EMD SD40T-2. 8300 series featured extended "snoot" noses for radio control equipment. 8278 was damaged beyond repair in the 1989 Cajon Pass runaway and sold for parts, then scrapped.
	Denver and Rio Grande Western Railroad	73	5341–5413	Model EMD SD40T-2. All with 81 in. or 88 in. short noses; No. 5371 was donated and restored at the Utah State Railway Museum at Ogden Utah. No. 5401 is preserved at the Colorado Railroad museum.
	St. Louis Southwestern Railway	10	8322–8326, 8372–8376	Model EMD SD40T-2. All built with extended noses for radio control equipment.
Canadian SD40-2 orders
Photograph	Railroad	Quantity	Road numbers	Notes
	Algoma Central Railway	6	183–188	Remaining units became WC 6002-6006 after the Wisconsin Central took over the Algoma Central. Later in service with Canadian National Railway. All retired.
	British Columbia Railway	17	751–767	Purchased after complications arose from safety concerns on a recent order of MLW M630Ws. 767 is the last SD40-2 built in Canada in July 1985.
	Canadian Pacific Railway	489	5565-5879, 5900-6069, 9000-9024, 5560(:2), 5583(:2), 5584(:2), 5693(:2)	Units 9000-9024 are GMD SD40-2F. Four additional new units were built to replace wrecked units. Some units were retired or sold to leasing firms. Now in service with Canadian Pacific Kansas City.
	Canadian National Railway	123	5241–5363	Model SD40-2W. Several were delivered without dynamic brakes. These units have the Canadian Safety Cab with 4 windows.
	Ontario Northland Railway	8	1730–1737	These are the only SD40-2s built by GMD London without dynamic brakes.
	Quebec, North Shore and Labrador Railway	44	221–264	Four engines now serve the short-line Wellsboro & Corning Railroad in northern Pennsylvania, hauling sand cars to support Marcellus shale hydraulic fracturing in the region.
Export SD40-2 orders
Photograph	Railroad	Quantity	Road numbers	Notes
	Chemin de Fer Boké (Guinea)	3	107–109	Meter gauge 1,000 mm (3 ft 3 3/8 in)
	Estrada de Ferro Carajás (Brazil)	29	401–429	Constructed by Equipamentos Villares S.A. (EVSA) and built to Irish Gauge (1,600 mm (5 ft 3 in)) specifications. 429 is the very last SD40-2 constructed in October 1989.
	Ferrocarriles Unidos del Sureste (Mexico)	4	601–604	The only SD40-2s in México without dynamic brakes.
	Ferrocarriles Nacionales de México (Mexico)	103	8700–8798, 13001–13004	13004 is the last SD40-2 built for México in February 1986.
	RFFSA (Brazil)	36	3711–3747	The only SD40-2s constructed in Europe for a Brazilian customer in Irish Gauge (1,600 mm (5 ft 3 in)) by Material y Construcciones S.A. (MACOSA).
	Mauritania Railway	21	CC101–CC121	SDL40-2 variant for operating in high temperatures. Last SD40-2 variant built in January 1997

== Variants ==
=== SD40T-2 ===
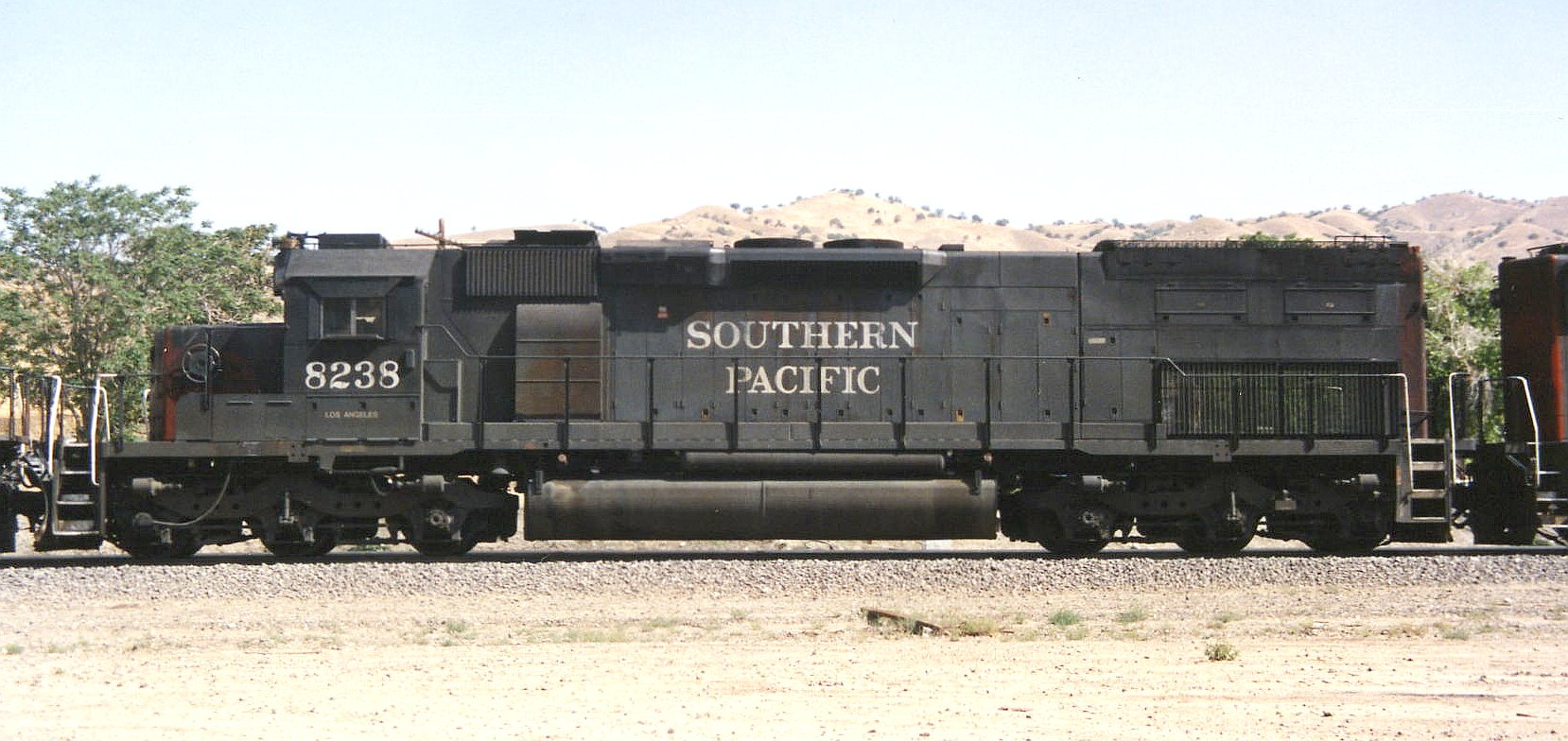
A Southern Pacific Railroad SD40T-2 at Caliente, California, in the 1980s

A variant of the SD40-2 was created for several western railroads for extended periods in tunnels and snow sheds. Originally purchased by Southern Pacific and Rio Grande railroads, these were transferred to the Union Pacific Railroad in 1996. They have since found their way into the used locomotive market and many have been sold to regional railroads around the U.S.

=== British Rail Class 59 ===
Another variant of the SD40-2 was created for Foster Yeoman, a British quarrying and aggregates company, which features a unique body design specifically for the European railway markets. Designated as Class 59, the initial production batch of four locomotives entered service in 1986.

=== SD40-2W ===
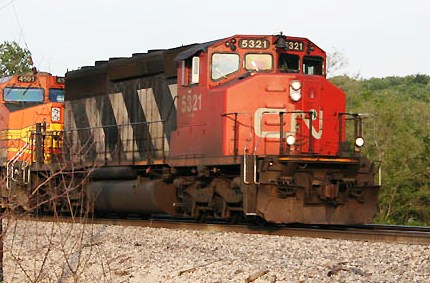
Canadian National SD40-2W 5321

The GMD SD40-2(W) is a Canadian-market version of the SD40-2 diesel–electric locomotive, built for the Canadian National Railway (CN) by the Diesel Division of General Motors of Canada Ltd. (formerly General Motors Diesel) of London, Ontario; 123 were constructed between May 1975 and December 1980.

=== SD40-2F ===
The EMD SD40-2F was a locomotive operated by CP Railway. It is essentially an SD40-2 with a full cowl hood. CP was the only buyer, buying 25 units, numbered 9000-9024. Most have been scrapped, but 10 were sold to the Central Maine and Quebec Railway. When CP acquired CMQ in 2020, the 10 SD40-2Fs became CP's once again. One unit was rebuilt to a hydrogen fuel cell locomotive in 2021-2022.

== Rebuilds ==
A number of SD40-2s have been rebuilt into other models. Some of the most unusual are the metre gauge BB40-2s for use in Brazil.

Conversely, several other models of EMD locomotive have sometimes been rebuilt to SD40-2 standards, including the SD40, SD45 and SD45-2. Normally, this consists of electrical upgrades (-2) and replacing the 20-cylinder prime mover with a 16-cylinder version, often built for GE Capital in Poland using EMD's manufacturing drawings and specifications. An outgrowth of this may be GE Transportation's second-sourcing of EMD repair parts.

The unusually troublesome SD50 have also been rebuilt into the equivalent of SD40-2s, rather than scrapping them. The 645F block and crankshaft are inherently good designs (indeed, the lessons learned with the 645F became part of the 710G); lowering the rating from 3,500 horsepower (2,600 kW) at 950 rpm to 3,000 horsepower (2,200 kW) at 900 rpm solved the mechanical and electrical reliability issues.

=== SD40N ===
Union Pacific has rebuilt 486 of their SD40-2s into SD40Ns at their Jenks shop. These units received a microprocessor control system to increase adhesion, control options, and extend the life of the locomotive.

=== SD40-3 ===
The Dash 3 suffix is not part of any official lineup, and is a loose designation for rebuilt Dash 2 series EMDs among several different railroads.

One example of an SD40-3 rebuild program is the one conducted by CSX at its Huntington, WV Shops. It started in 2010 with 10 units upgraded and numbered 4000-4009; in 2011, 20 units went through the program and were numbered 4010-4029 and in 2012 another 20 units followed and were numbered 4030-4049. One of the most notable rebuilds was SD40-2 8888, (now rebuilt to 4389), which in 2001 was involved in a runaway incident caused by the failure of the engineer to notice the train gradually accelerating during yard switching. These locomotives feature new cabs, air conditioning systems, and other new technologies.

Norfolk Southern also has an ongoing SD40-3 rebuild program as of 2023.

=== SD22ECO ===
The SD22ECO is an EMD SD40-2 or similar, repowered with an EMD 8-710-ECO engine. The resulting locomotive is rated at 2,150 horsepower (1,600 kW), and meets EPA Tier II emissions regulations.

=== SD30C-ECO ===
The SD30C-ECO is an EMD SD40-2 re-powered with an EMD 12-710 prime mover. The locomotive is rated at 3,000 horsepower (2,200 kW) and meets EPA Tier 0 emissions regulations. A similar rebuild, the SD40E3 was carried out by CSX in early 2017.

=== ET23DCM ===
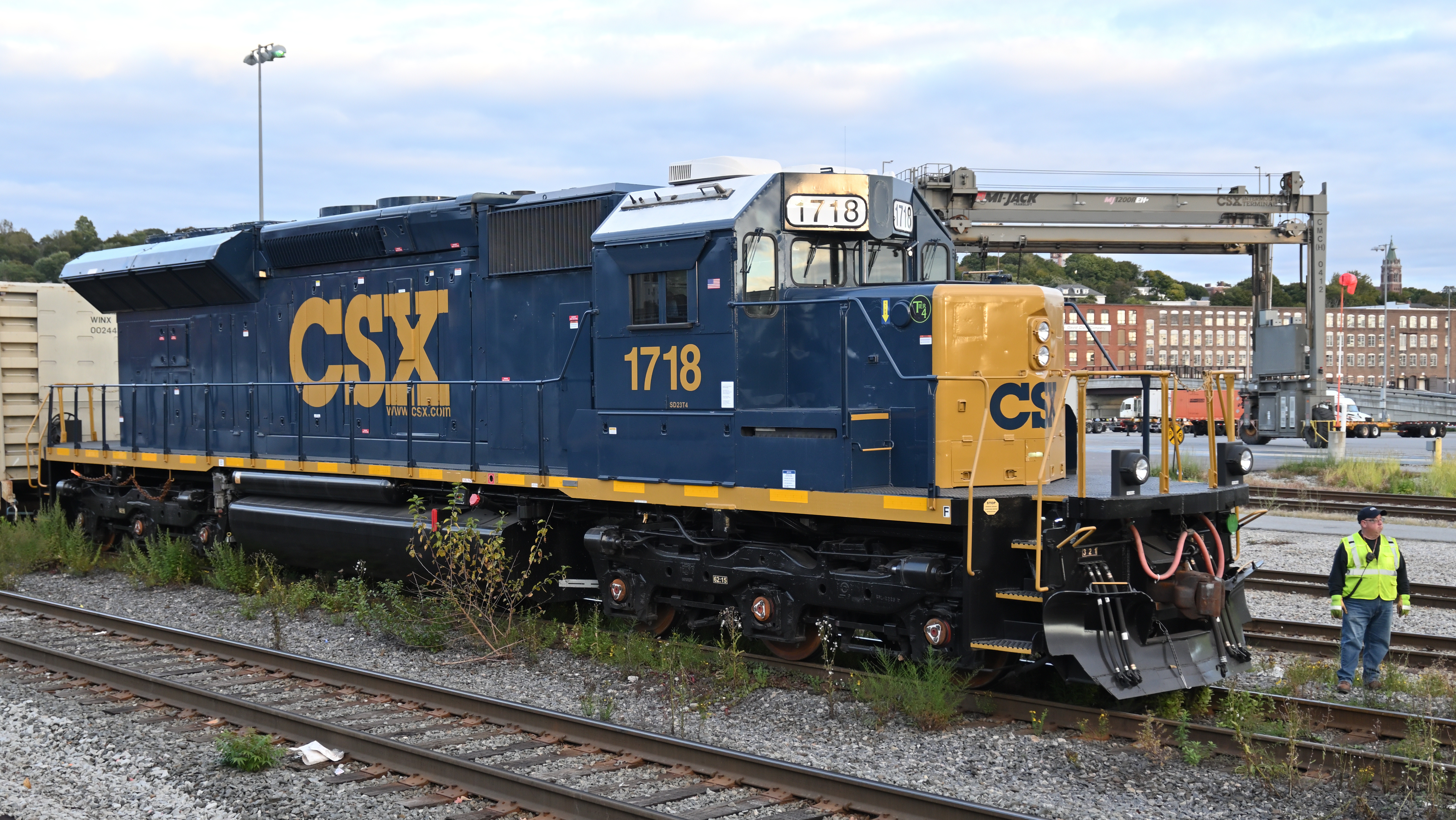
A CSX ET23DCM (SD23T4) locomotive in Worcester, Massachusetts

The ET23DCM is an EMD SD40-2 rebuilt by Wabtec, and repowered with a GE Evolution Series Inline 6 cylinder prime mover. This locomotive meets the EPA Tier 4 emission standards. CSX has ordered 15 locomotives, and Wabtec constructed one demonstrator locomotive.

== Preservation ==
=== SD40-2 ===
- Canadian Pacific #5903 is preserved at the Canadian Railway Museum in Delson, Quebec, making it the first SD40-2 to be preserved in Canada
- Chicago & North Western #6847 is preserved at the Illinois Railway Museum in Union, Illinois.
- Milwaukee Road #156 is preserved by the Midwest Overland Rail Preservation Society and was restored to its Bicentennial paint scheme in July 2026.
- Norfolk & Western #6162 is preserved by the Kentucky Steam Heritage Corp in Irvine, Kentucky.
- Union Pacific #3105 (ex-MP #6027) is preserved at the RailGiants Train Museum at Fairplex in Pomona, California. It was donated in 2014 in exchange for Union Pacific Big Boy No. 4014, which was restored in 2019.
- Union Pacific #3593, later Rapid City, Pierre and Eastern #3422, was donated by Genesee & Wyoming to the American Heartland Railroad Society in May 2026. The society plans to repaint the unit back into its Desert Victory camouflage scheme to mark the 35th anniversary of Operation Desert Storm.
- Union Pacific #9950 is preserved at the Western America Railroad Museum in Barstow, California. It was donated by Union Pacific in 2004.

=== SD40T-2 ===
- Denver & Rio Grande Western #5371 is preserved at the Utah State Railroad Museum in Ogden, Utah.
- Denver & Rio Grande Western #5401 is preserved at the Colorado Railroad Museum in Golden, Colorado.

== See also ==
- List of GM-EMD locomotives
- List of GMD Locomotives
