= CSX 8888 incident =

2001 runaway train event in Ohio, US

- CSX 8888 EMD SD40-2, the locomotive involved in the incident

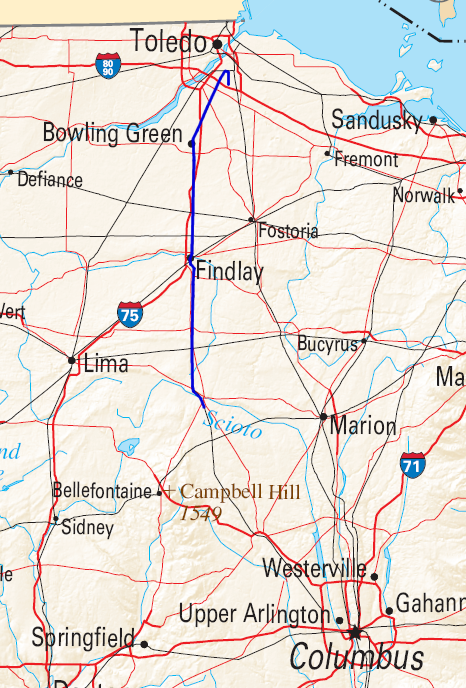
- The train's path highlighted in blue

Details
- Date: May 15, 2001; 25 years ago 12:35 p.m. to 2:30 p.m.
- Location: Walbridge, Ohio – Kenton, Ohio; 66 mi (106 km) south
- Country: United States
- Line: Toledo Line Subdivision
- Operator: CSX Transportation
- Incident type: Runaway train
- Cause: Operator error

Statistics
- Damage: None

The CSX 8888 incident, also known as the Crazy Eights incident, was a runaway train event involving a CSX Transportation freight train in the U.S. state of Ohio on May 15, 2001. Locomotive no. 8888, an EMD SD40-2, ran uncontrolled for just under two hours at up to 53 miles per hour (85 km/h) while pulling a train of 47 cars; 2 cars were loaded with molten phenol, a substance used in dyes and glues. It was finally halted by a railroad crew in a catch locomotive, who caught up with the runaway train and coupled their locomotive to the rear car. The incident inspired the 2010 movie Unstoppable.

As of November 2026, the locomotive is still in service, having been rebuilt and upgraded to an SD40-3 as part of a refurbishment program carried out by CSX in 2015; it is now numbered 4389 and it has a different cab. It was delivered as Conrail no. 6410 in September 1977.

== Timeline ==
On May 15, 2001, a CSX locomotive engineer was using locomotive no. 8888 to move a string of freight cars from track K12 to track D10 for departure on another train at Stanley Yard in Walbridge, Ohio, CSX's primary classification yard for Toledo. The string consisted of 47 freight cars; 25 of them were empty, but 22 of them were fully loaded, including two tank cars containing thousands of gallons of molten phenol, a toxic ingredient used in the production of many products, including plastics, epoxies, nylon, numerous pharmaceutical drugs, detergents, and paints. It causes severe chemical burns upon direct skin or eye contact and is exceedingly harmful when ingested.

The engineer noticed a misaligned switch and concluded that his train, although moving slowly, would not be able to stop short of it, because the tracks were damp from rain. He decided to climb down from the train, correctly align the switch, and reboard the locomotive.

Before leaving the cab, the engineer applied the locomotive's independent air brake. His application of that brake also disabled the train's dead man's switch, which would otherwise have applied the train brakes and cut the engine power. During operation on a main rail line, he would also have applied the automatic air brake, which would activate the brakes on each of the train's cars. But, as is normal for intra-yard movements, the air brakes of the train were not connected to the locomotive and thus were not functional.

The engineer also attempted to apply the locomotive's dynamic brake to slow the train to a crawl; dynamic brakes dissipate momentum (kinetic energy) by using the momentum of the train to drive the traction motors (the reverse of the usual situation in which the motors drive the train), slowing the train and generating electricity as a regenerative braking system does in a hybrid or electric automobile. However, the engineer "inadvertently failed to complete the selection process", meaning that he in effect set the train to accelerate rather than brake. Using the power throttle handle, the throttle for the traction motors was set at notch 8. If the dynamic brakes had been engaged as intended, the locomotive would have used the motors against the momentum of the train, causing it to slow down. Instead, the train began to accelerate. His mistake was possible because the dynamic brake system in the EMD locomotives of the time used a separate selection lever for the dynamic brake with three positions: "off", "set-up", and "brk/brake". To apply the dynamic brakes, the engineer would need to re-apply the throttle while that selection lever was in the "brake" position. Without the dynamic brakes, the only functioning brakes were the air brakes on the locomotive, and they were not enough to counteract its power.

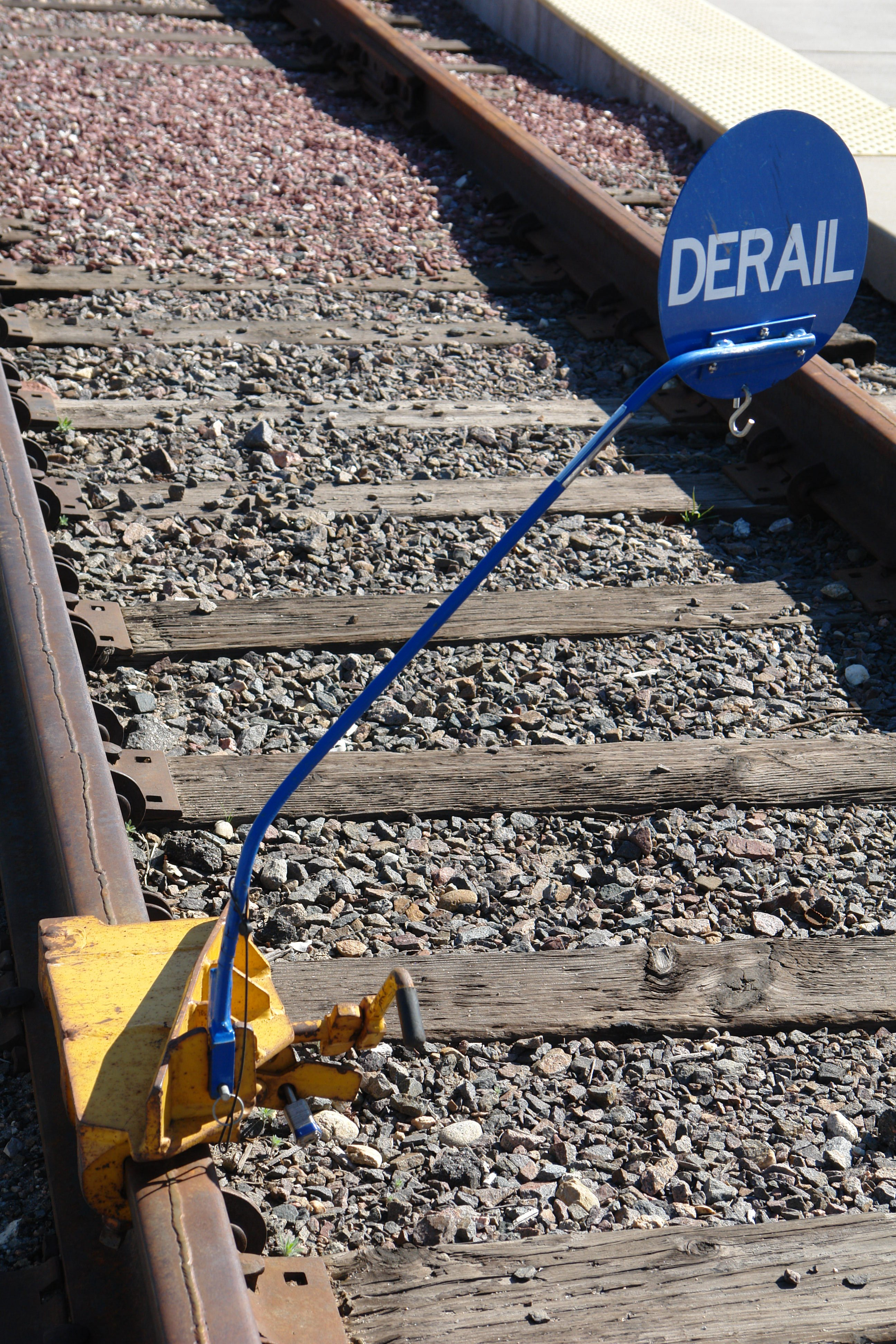
A portable derailer

The engineer climbed down from the cab, aligned the switch, and then attempted to reboard the accelerating locomotive. However, he was unable to do so and was dragged for about 80 feet (24 m), receiving minor cuts and abrasions. The train rolled out of the yard and began a 65-mile (105 km) journey south through northwest Ohio unmanned. Attempts to derail the train using a portable derailer failed; the portable derailer was thrown off the track by the force of the train when struck. Police officers tried to shut the engine down via fuel starvation by shooting at the red fuel cutoff button, but three shots mistakenly hit the fuel cap, which was larger and also red. (Shooting the fuel cutoff button would have had no effect in any case, because the buttons on former Conrail SD40-2s (like CSX 8888) must be held down for several seconds before the switch is activated.) A northbound freight train, Q636-15, was directed onto a siding where the crew uncoupled its locomotive, CSX no. 8392 (another EMD SD40-2), and waited for the runaway train to pass. Locomotive 8392 had a crew of two: Jess Knowlton, an engineer with 31 years of service; and Terry L. Forson, a conductor with about one year's experience. Together they chased the runaway train. An EMD GP40-2, CSX locomotive no. 6008, was prepared farther down the line to couple to the front of the runaway to slow it further, if necessary.

Knowlton and Forson successfully coupled onto the rear car and slowed the train by applying the dynamic brakes on the chase locomotive. Once the runaway had slowed to 12 miles per hour (19 km/h), CSX trainmaster Jon Hosfeld ran alongside the train, climbed aboard, and shut down the engine, stopping it at the Ohio State Route 31 crossing just southeast of Kenton, Ohio. Locomotive no. 6008 had been waiting farther down the track and was not used in stopping the train. All the brake shoes on no. 8888 had been completely burned off by the heat, since they had been applied for the entire runaway trip.

CSX never made public the name of the 35-year veteran engineer whose error caused the runaway, nor what disciplinary action was taken.

== In popular culture ==
The incident inspired the 2010 movie Unstoppable, directed by Tony Scott and starring Denzel Washington and Chris Pine.
