= Boise Locomotive Company =

American locomotive manufacturer

- Formerly: Morrison Knudsen Rail Company
- Company type: Subsidiary
- Founded: January 1, 1997
- Successor: MotivePower
- Headquarters: Boise, Idaho

The Boise Locomotive Company (BLC) was a subsidiary of MotivePower, Inc. (MPI), that was a successor to Morrison–Knudsen (M–K). They were a major locomotive manufacturer and rebuilder in Boise, Idaho.

== History ==
The company was originally known as Morrison–Knudsen Rail Company (reporting mark MKCX). MKCX eventually renamed themselves to the Boise Locomotive Company on January 1, 1997, and had many purchases from the Union Pacific Railroad (UP) that acted as trade-ins when most railroads started to merge into Union Pacific.

UP had inherited so many locomotives from its predecessors on its roster, that the railroad had decided to retire these locomotives and dispose of them, as many of these inherited locomotives were older and needed rebuilding, or patching, renumbering and repainting, to be integrated into the new 32,100 mi (51,700 km) network. They eventually started working under a contract by Helm Financial Corporation (HLCX) to overhaul several locomotives that would be leased to UP or even other companies. In November 1999, Boise Locomotive Company would merge with the Westinghouse Air Brake Company (WABCO).

== Model information ==
Model designation	Build year	Total produced	AAR wheel arrangement	Prime mover	Power output	Notes
Rebuilt low-emissions locomotives
MK1200G	1993-1994	4	B-B	CAT 3612NG	1,200 hp (890 kW)	
Model designation	Build year	Total produced	AAR wheel arrangement	Prime mover	Power output	Notes
Rebuilt locomotives
F40PHR-2C	1992	3	B-B	EMD 16-645E3	3,000–3,200 hp (2,200–2,400 kW)	Ex-AMTK
GP38-3	1997-1998	27	B-B	EMD 645	2,000 hp (1,500 kW)	Former CSX, HLLX, UP and D&RGW GP40s
GP38-2	1998-1999	60	B-B	EMD 645	2,000 hp (1,500 kW)	Former SP, SOO, UP and D&RGW GP40s.
SD40-3/SD40TM-3	1999	7	C-C	EMD 16-645	3,000–3,200 hp (2,200–2,400 kW)	Former SP SD45T-2 & SD45T-2Rs
SD40M-2	1999	1	C-C	EMD 645	3,000–3,200 hp (2,200–2,400 kW)	Former SP SD45R 7404, completed as HLCX 6406

== See also ==
- Talgo-Livingston Rebuild Center

== Bibliography ==
- Shippen, Bill; Shine, Joseph W. (1999). Southern Pacific in Transition. Four Ways Publications. ISBN 978-1-885614-26-1.
- Lamb, J. Parker (2007-06-14). Evolution of the American Diesel Locomotive. Indiana University Press. ISBN 978-0-253-02798-6.
- Solomon, Brian (2012-12-15). North American Locomotives: A Railroad-by-Railroad Photohistory. Voyageur Press. ISBN 978-1-61058-685-6.
- Solomon, Brian (2013-10-07). Classic Locomotives: Steam and Diesel Power in 700 Photographs. Voyageur Press. ISBN 978-1-61058-868-3.
