= EMD SD60 series =

North American locomotive class

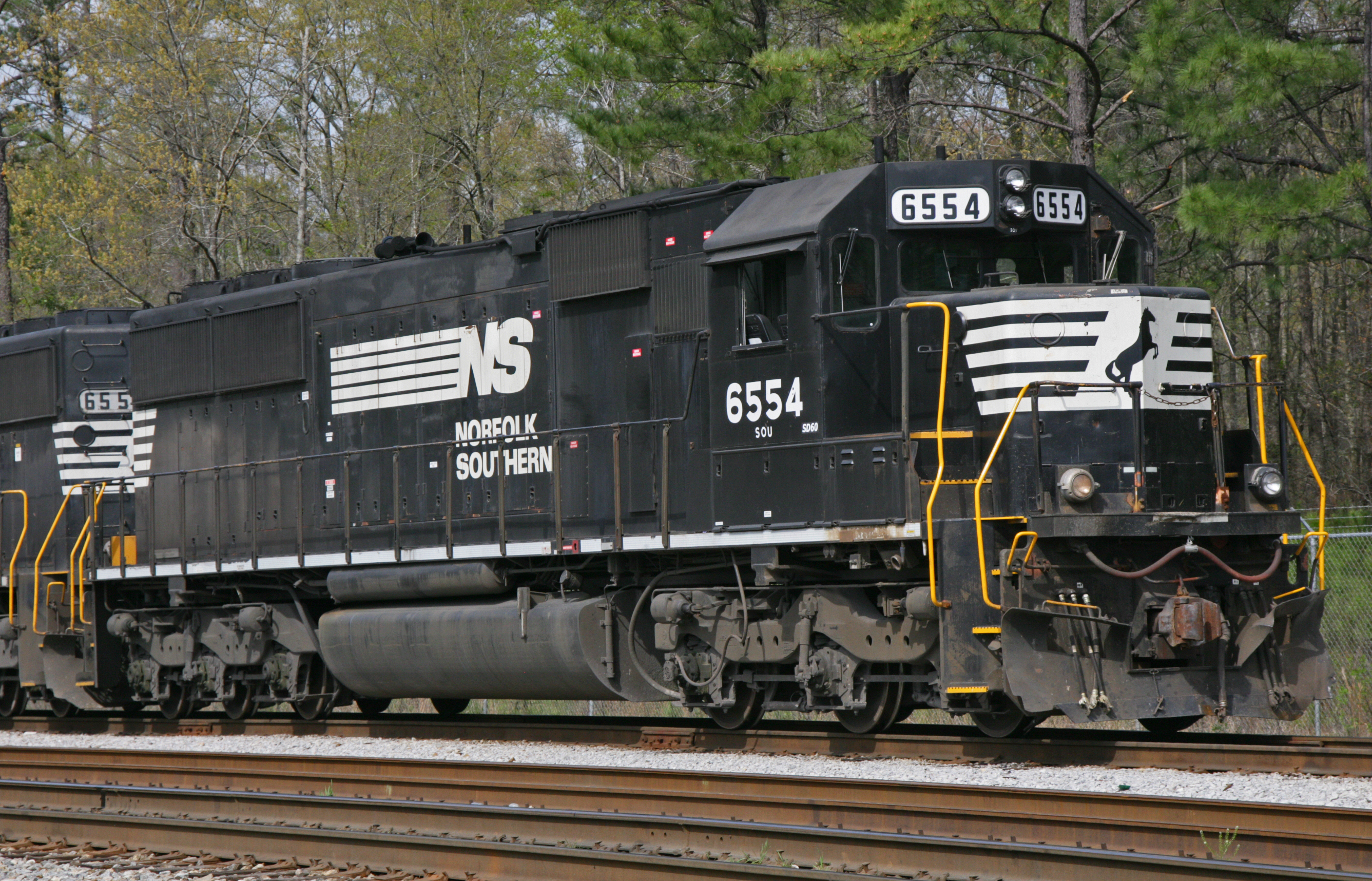
- Norfolk Southern Railway EMD SD60 no. 6554
Type and origin
- Power type: Diesel-electric
- Builder: Electro-Motive Division (EMD); General Motors Diesel (GMD)
- Model: SD60
- Build date: 1984–1995
- Total produced: 1,533
Specifications
- Configuration
  - AAR: C-C
  - UIC: Co'Co'
- Gauge: 4 ft 8 1/2 in (1,435 mm) standard gauge 5 ft 3 in (1,600 mm), Brazil
- Wheel diameter: 40 in (1,000 mm)
- Wheelbase: 13 ft 7 in (4.14 m)
- Length: 71 ft 2 in (21.69 m)
- Width: 10 ft 3 in (3.12 m)
- Height: 15 ft 7.5 in (4.76 m)
- Loco weight: 368,000 lb (166,922 kg)
- Prime mover: EMD 16-710G3A
- Engine type: V16 diesel
- Alternator: AR-11
- Traction motors: D-87
- Cylinders: 16
- MU working: AAR
Performance figures
- Maximum speed: 70 mph (113 km/h)
- Power output: 3,800 hp (2.8 MW) at 900 rpm
- Tractive effort: Starting: 114,000 lbf (510 kN) @ 25% Continuous: 100,000 lbf (445 kN) @9.8 mph (15.8 km/h)
Career
- Operators: See original owners
- Locale: North America, Brazil
- Disposition: Some still in service as of 2026, 1 preserved

The EMD SD60 is a series of 3,800 horsepower (2,800 kW), six-axle diesel-electric locomotives built by General Motors Electro-Motive Division, intended for heavy-duty drag freight or medium-speed freight service. It was introduced in 1984, and production ran until 1995.

== History and development ==
The SD60 is essentially identical to the SD50 externally, but has a different prime mover, the new 16-cylinder EMD 710G3A, and a computer-controlled electrical system. Chicago & North Western's railroad manual estimated that the SD60 is 3% more fuel efficient than one SD50, while a pair of SD60s was up to 16% more efficient than three SD40s pulling a standard coal train.

Norfolk Southern had modernised some of their old SD60s from 2010-2017 into SD60Es, a model specific to NS.

== Models ==
=== SD60 ===
This was the original model, and had a conventional hood unit configuration with the 40 Series (spartan) cab first employed on the SD40-2.

=== SD60F ===
The SD60F was ordered and was operated by Canadian National and has a full-width cowl body and crashworthy "safety cab" with a four-piece windshield. CN retired the SD60F in 2017, however a handful were sold off and are still working on two shortlines in North Dakota. Dakota, Missouri Valley and Western Railroad has six, and the Northern Plains Railroad has five. 14 units are currently on the Aberdeen, Carolina & Western Railway in North Carolina.

=== SD60I ===
The SD60I model has a full-width short hood and features the so-called "WhisperCab" that was insulated from sound and vibration using a system of rubber gaskets. They are easily distinguished from the SD60M by the visible vertical seam just behind the front of the nose. The same cab was later used on EMD's SD70I, SD75I, SD80MAC and SD90MAC locomotives. Only Conrail ordered this model, and after 1999 all were split between the Norfolk Southern and CSX. All SD60I locomotives have either have been scrapped, sold to new owners or retired.

=== SD60M ===
The SD60M features a "North American safety cab" design and has a full-width short hood. Early models until 1990 featured a three-piece windshield with vertical windows (nicknamed "triclops"), identical to the windshields found on EMD's SD40-2F and F59PH models. Later production from 1991 used two windshield panes that were sloped back, and had a somewhat shorter nose tapered on the sides. Purchasers of this model included Conrail, Union Pacific, Burlington Northern and the Soo Line Railroad. Conrail's orders were split between the Norfolk Southern and CSX upon their acquisitions of parts Conrail in 1999. All Norfolk Southern and CSX SD60M locomotives have either been scrapped, sold to new owners, or retired.

=== SD60MAC ===
The SD60MAC is similar to the "triclops" SD60M but is equipped with alternating current traction motors. Although four demonstrator SD60MAC units tested on the Burlington Northern proved the viability of EMD's AC traction system, all subsequent orders were for the SD70MAC locomotive.

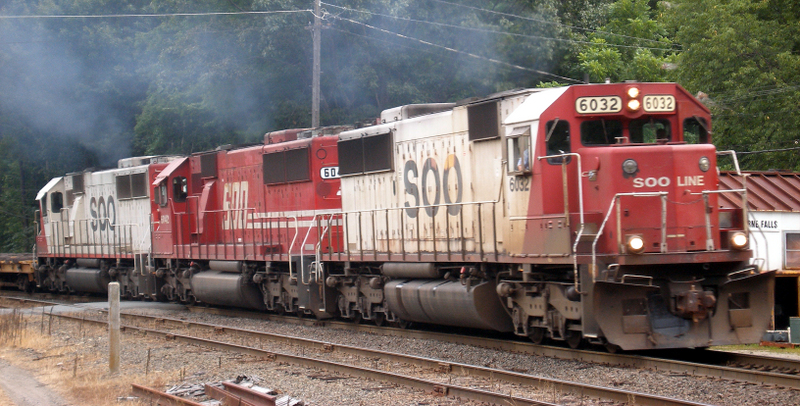
A trio of SOO Line EMD SD60s with no. 6032 leading

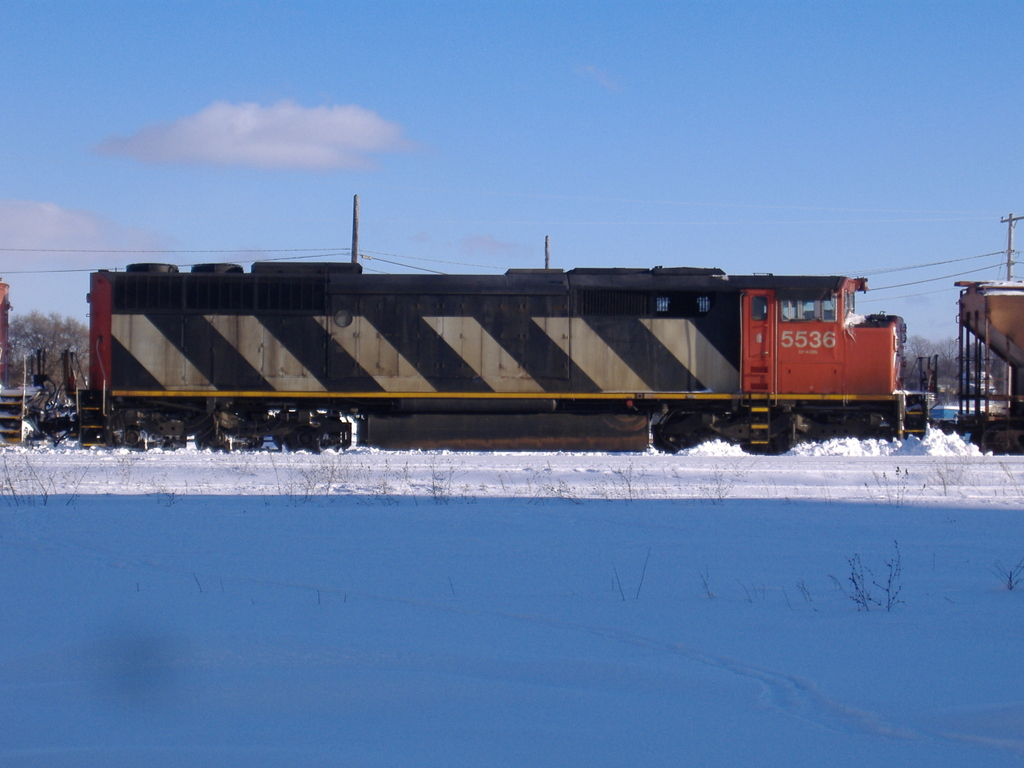
GMD SD60F, CN no. 5536

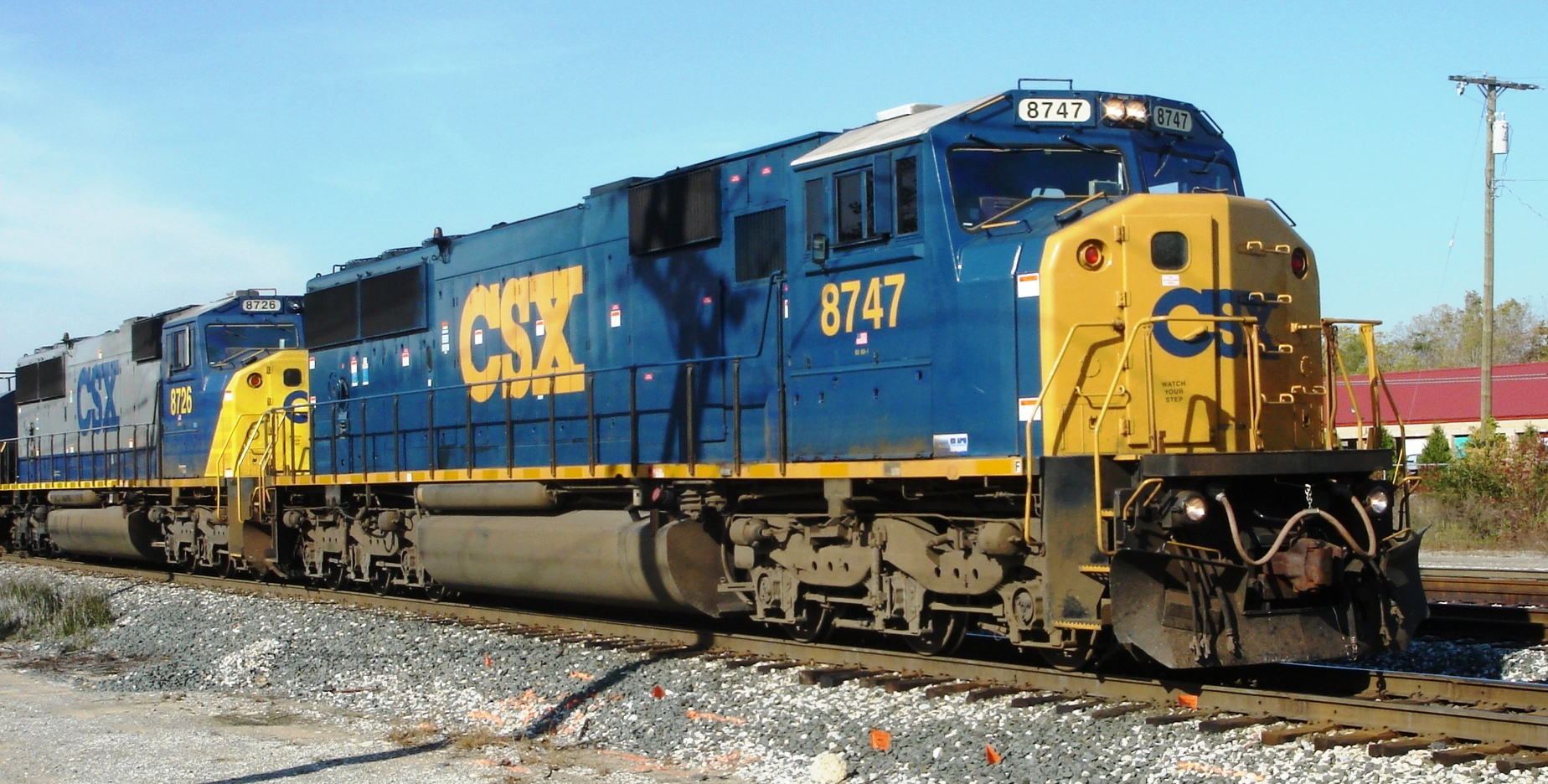
EMD SD60I, CSX no. 8747, Plymouth, Michigan

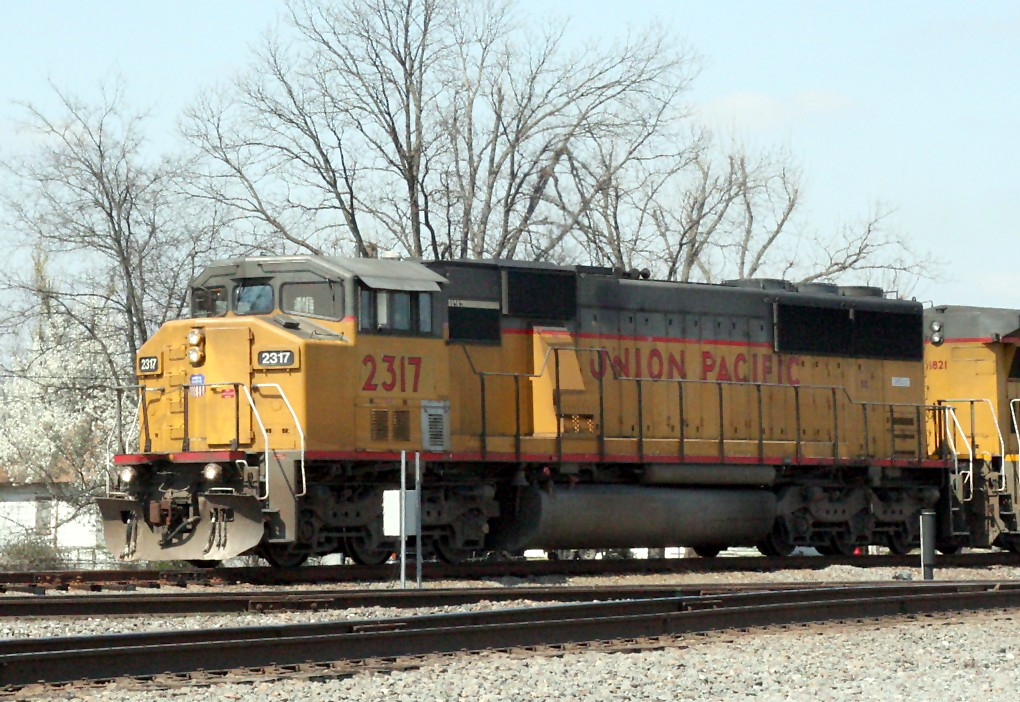
EMD SD60M (Early model, "Triclops"), UP 2317

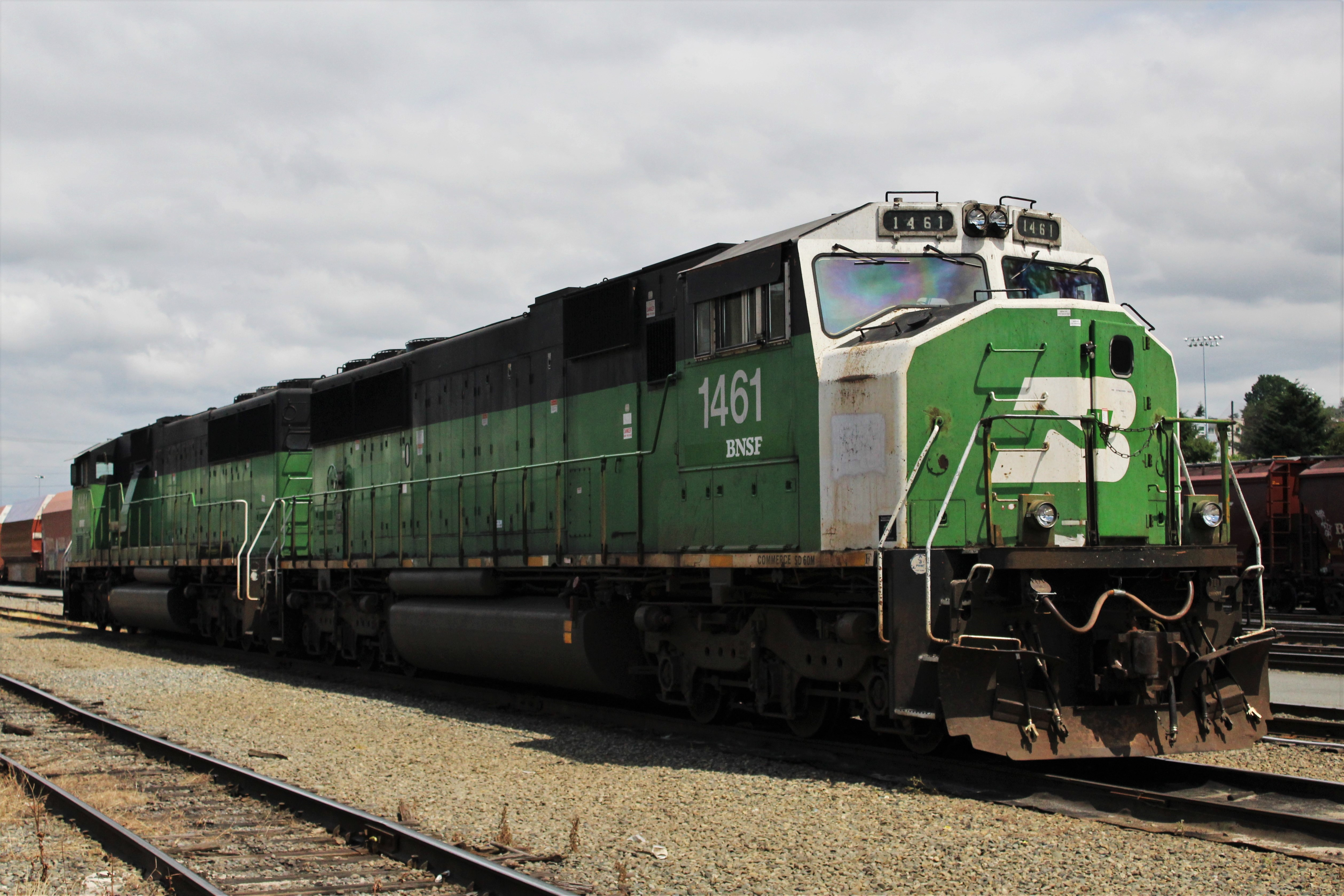
EMD SD60M (Late model, 2-Piece windshield), BNSF 1461

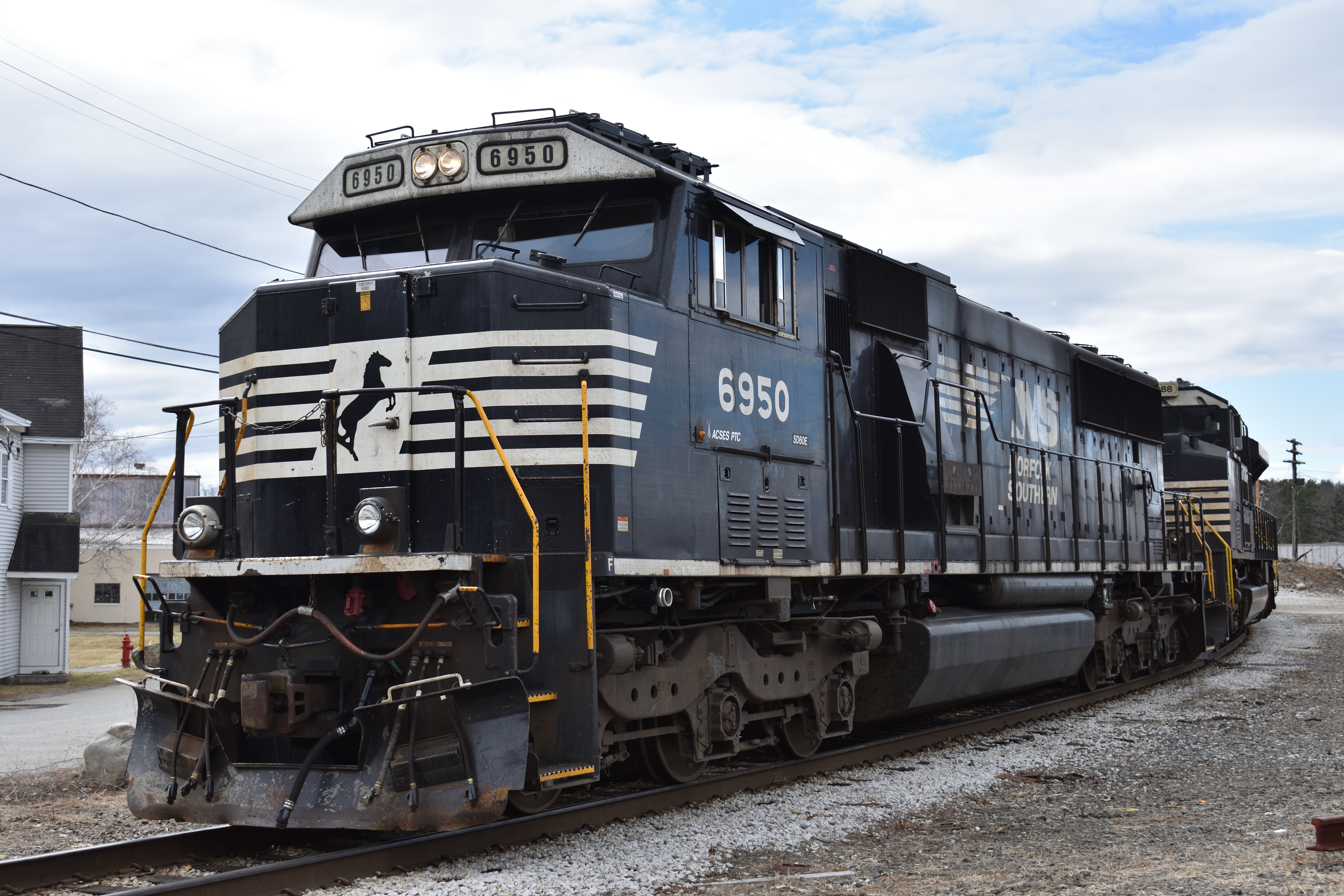
A Norfolk Southern EMD SD60E locomotive in Ayer, Massachusetts.

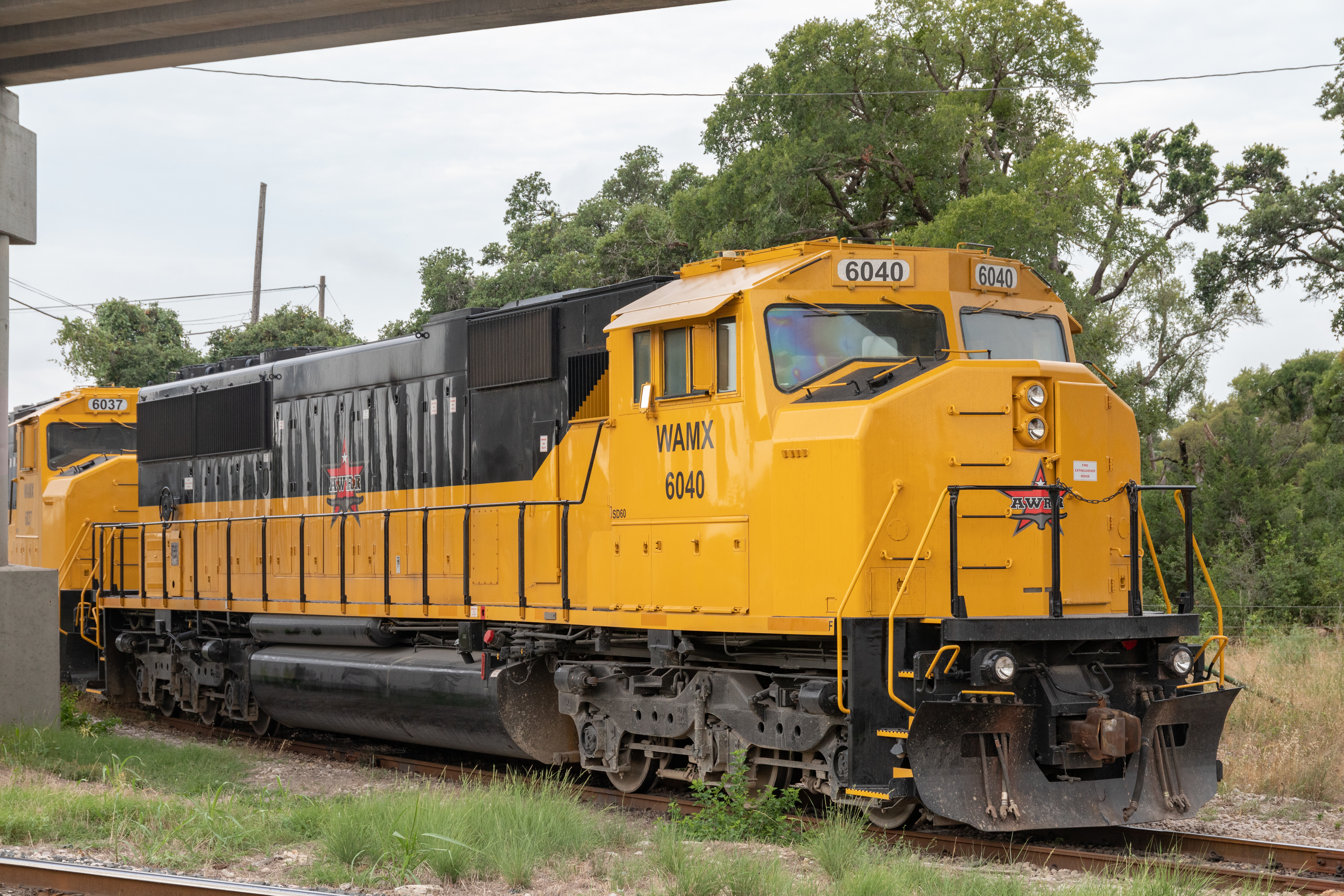
Many SD60Ms have found their way onto shortline railroads. These units work on Watco's Austin Western Railroad in Texas.

Penn State University no. 2020, a preserved SD60i gifted from Norfolk Southern, on display in 2024.

=== SD60E ===
The SD60E is a custom rebuild of standard cab SD60 for Norfolk Southern created at the Juniata Shops with the prototype being delivered in 2010 and the majority of the production taking place between 2013 and 2017. The SD60E utilizes a new NS-designed wide nose cab with increased crash protection, new electronics and up-rating the engine to the 4000 hp 710G3B standard. Norfolk Southern bought additional SD60s from Helm Leasing specifically for the SD60E program with the aim to eventually rebuild 240 SD60s, however the project was terminated after 135 had been completed and Norfolk Southern's remaining inventory of unrebuilt SD60 series locomotives were subsequently sold to other railroads or for scrap in 2019. In May 2021, Norfolk Southern regeared SD60E numbers 7034 and 7035 to go 79 mph and assigned the locomotives to the railroad's Office Car Special train. They were then regeared back to freight service in February 2024. However, they are likely to be retired soon

== Operators ==
Image	Railroad	Qty.	Road numbers
EMD SD60
	Burlington Northern	3	8300-8302
	Chicago & North Western	55	8001-8055
	Conrail	25	6843-6867 (to NS 6701–6716)
	CSX	26	8700-8721, 8787–8790
	EMDX	4	1-4
	Kansas City Southern	46	714-759
	Nebraska Central Railroad	4	2197, 2207, 2222, 2225 (former UP)
	Norfolk Southern	151	6550-6700
	Oakway, Inc.	100	9000-9099
	Soo Line	58	6000-6057 (To Canadian Pacific, 6221-6257)
	Union Pacific	85	6000-6084 (renumbered 2100–2239)
	Canadian National	90	5400-5489 (former Oakway)
	Canadian Pacific	37	6221–6257 (former SOO)
	Watco	6	6623, 6627, 6656, 6667, 6668, 6695 (former Norfolk Southern acquired)
	Fort Worth and Western Railroad	4	5980 (former Union Pacific), 6002, 6009, 6013 (former SOO)
NS SD60E
	Norfolk Southern	135	6900-7035 (not consecutive), 7003 was renumbered to 911
EMD SD60F
	Canadian National	64	5500-5563
	Aberdeen Carolina Western	13	5520-5521, 5526–5527, 5534, 5536, 5539, 5545, 5548–5549, 5558-5560 (former Canadian National)
	Dakota, Missouri Valley and Western Railroad	6	5500-5501, 5504, 5523, 5544, 5557 (former Canadian National)
	Northern Plains Railroad	5	5513, 5517–5518, 5525, 5535 (former Canadian National)
EMD SD60I
	Conrail	81	5544, 5575–5654
	Norfolk Southern	46	6717-6762 (former Conrail, no. 6721 to PSU)
	CSX	53	8722-8774 (former Conrail)
	Penn State University	1	2020 (former Conrail no. 5582, NS no. 6721)
	Terminal Railroad Association of St Louis	2	4001-4002 (former CSX)
	Ohio Central	6	3880-3885 (former Buffalo and Pittsburgh)
EMD SD60M
	Burlington Northern	100	1991, 9200–9298
	Conrail	74	5500-5543, 5545-5574 (in 1999: 44 becoming Norfolk Southern 6763-6806 and 31 becoming CSX 8756–8786)
	Soo Line	5	6058-6062
	Union Pacific	281	6085-6365 (renumbered 2169, 2240–2520); 28 (renumbered 9900–9927) rebuilt as SD59MX (EMD SD59M-2)
	Norfolk Southern	53	6763-6806 (from Conrail 1999) 6807-6815 (former BNSF acquired 07–2014)
	CSX	31	8756-8786 (former Conrail)
	Ohio Central	10	2280, 2400, 2516 3886-3892 (2280 ,2400 & 2516 are ex Union Pacific. 3886-3892 are ex Buffalo and Pittsburgh)
	Carajás Railroad (Vale)	2	601-602
	Watco	41	6013-6015, 6022–6045 6047–6059 (former Union Pacific acquired)
	Wisconsin & Southern	8	6165, 6092, 6125, 6141, 6183, 6224, 6240, 6238 (Renumbered 6022–6029)(Former Union Pacific)
	Yadkin Valley Railroad	6	8769, 8771–8772, 8781, 8783, 8786 (former CSX)
	Carload Express	6	6001-6006 (former Norfolk Southern)
	Fort Worth and Western Railroad	6	2033-2038 (former Union Pacific)
	Larry's Truck Electric	41	2240, 2242, 2244, 2245, 2247, 2254, 2256, 2257, 2260, 2269, 2270, 2273, 2278, 2281, 2291, 2300, 2310, 2314, 2316, 2321, 2322, 2324, 2326, 2328, 2335, 2341, 2354, 2356, 2368, 2376, 2380, 2394, 2410, 2411, 2436, 2438, 2443, 2446, 2456, 2461, 2485 (former Union Pacific)
EMD SD60MAC
	Burlington Northern	4	9500-9503 (Returned to EMD)
	Totals	1,774	

== Preservation ==
In October 2019, Norfolk Southern donated SD60I #6721 (ex. Conrail #5582) to Penn State University Altoona, marking one of the first Conrail road locomotives to survive into preservation. It has moved to the Railroaders Memorial Museum as of 2023.

== See also ==
- List of GM-EMD locomotives
- List of GMD Locomotives
