= EMD SD22ECO =

Type and origin
- Power type: Diesel-electric
- Builder: Electro-Motive Diesel (EMD)
Specifications
- Configuration
  - AAR: C-C
- Gauge: 4 ft 8 1/2 in (1,435 mm)
- Prime mover: EMD 710G3A, 8–710G3A–T2
- Cylinders: V8
- Transmission: Diesel-electric
Performance figures
- Power output: 2,150 hp (1,600 kW)

The EMD SD22ECO is a 2,150 hp (1,600 kW) C-C diesel-electric locomotive rebuilt by Electro-Motive Diesel. It is, along with the GP22ECO, primarily the application of a conversion kit to an existing EMD SD40-type locomotive. This involves replacing the existing prime mover with an EPA Tier-II-compliant turbocharged V8 710G3A-T2, with electronic fuel injection. The prime mover is mated to an AR10 alternator for traction power, a CA6 alternator for control power, and a computerized control system. This conversion does not alter the external appearance of the locomotive.

The Kansas City Southern Railway and Kansas City Southern de México were the only railroads to have rebuilt SD40s into SD22ECOs.

== Rebuilders ==
Railroad	Quantity	Road Numbers	Notes
KCS	2	2600 & 2601	Rebuilt from TFM SDP40 1319 & 1320
KCSM	2	2650 & 2651	Rebuilt from KCS SD40-2 690 & 692
