= Dakota, Missouri Valley and Western Railroad =

Railroad in the United States

Dakota, Missouri Valley & Western Railroad
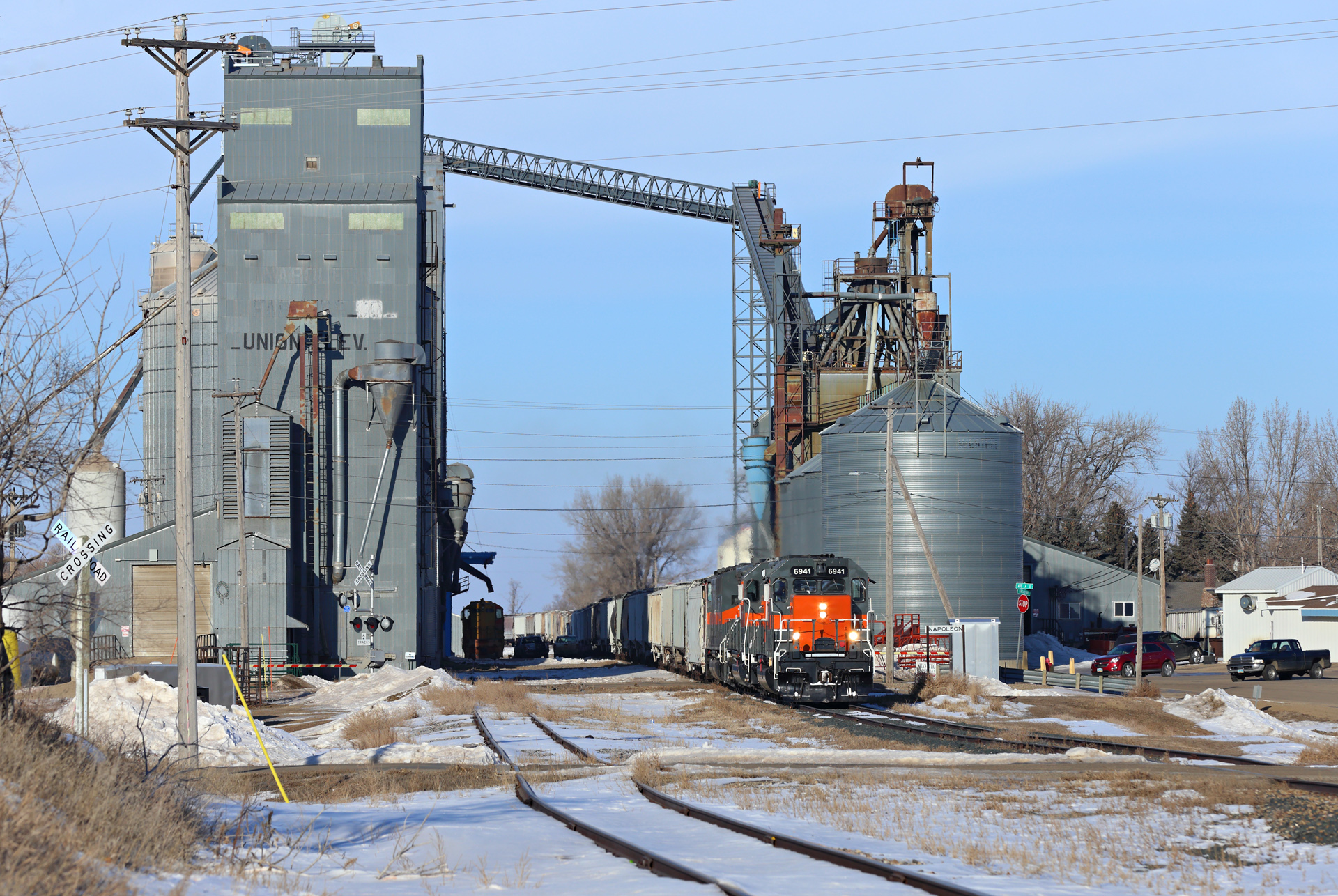
- DMVW Corn Train in Napoleon, North Dakota, in January 2019

Overview
- Headquarters: Bismarck, North Dakota
- Reporting mark: DMVW
- Locale: North Dakota, South Dakota, Montana
- Dates of operation: 1990–present

Technical
- Track gauge: 4 ft 8 1/2 in (1,435 mm)
- Length: 523 miles (842 km)

Other
- Website: Official website

The Dakota, Missouri Valley and Western Railroad (reporting mark DMVW) started operations in September 1990 operating over 360 miles (580 km) of former Soo Line Railroad track in Montana and North Dakota. The railroad operates approximately 523 miles (893 km) of track. DMVW's network includes 435 miles (700 km) of track leased from Canadian Pacific Railway, 13 miles (21 km) of track from McKenzie, North Dakota, to Moffit, North Dakota, and 75 miles (121 km) of track from Geneseo, North Dakota, to Aberdeen, South Dakota. DMVW maintains its headquarters in Bismarck, North Dakota, and has field offices in Crosby, North Dakota, Wishek, North Dakota, and Oakes, North Dakota, as well as Britton, South Dakota.
