= Toledo Line Subdivision =

The Toledo Branch subdivision is a rail line owned by CSX Transportation. This line is located in Northern/Central Ohio, running north from Ridgeway to Toledo. The branch runs through many towns, including Kenton, Findlay, and Bowling Green, OH. The railroad is a portion of the former Toledo and Ohio Central Railway, beginning at Stanley Yard (near Walbridge, OH) and turning into the Scottslawn Secondary subdivision at Ridgeway.
