= Highland, Minnesota =

Highland, Minnesota may refer to:

- Highland, Fillmore County, Minnesota
- Highland, Lake County, Minnesota
- Highland, Wright County, Minnesota
- Highland Township, Wabasha County, Minnesota
