= EMD SD32ECO =

Model of American diesel locomotive

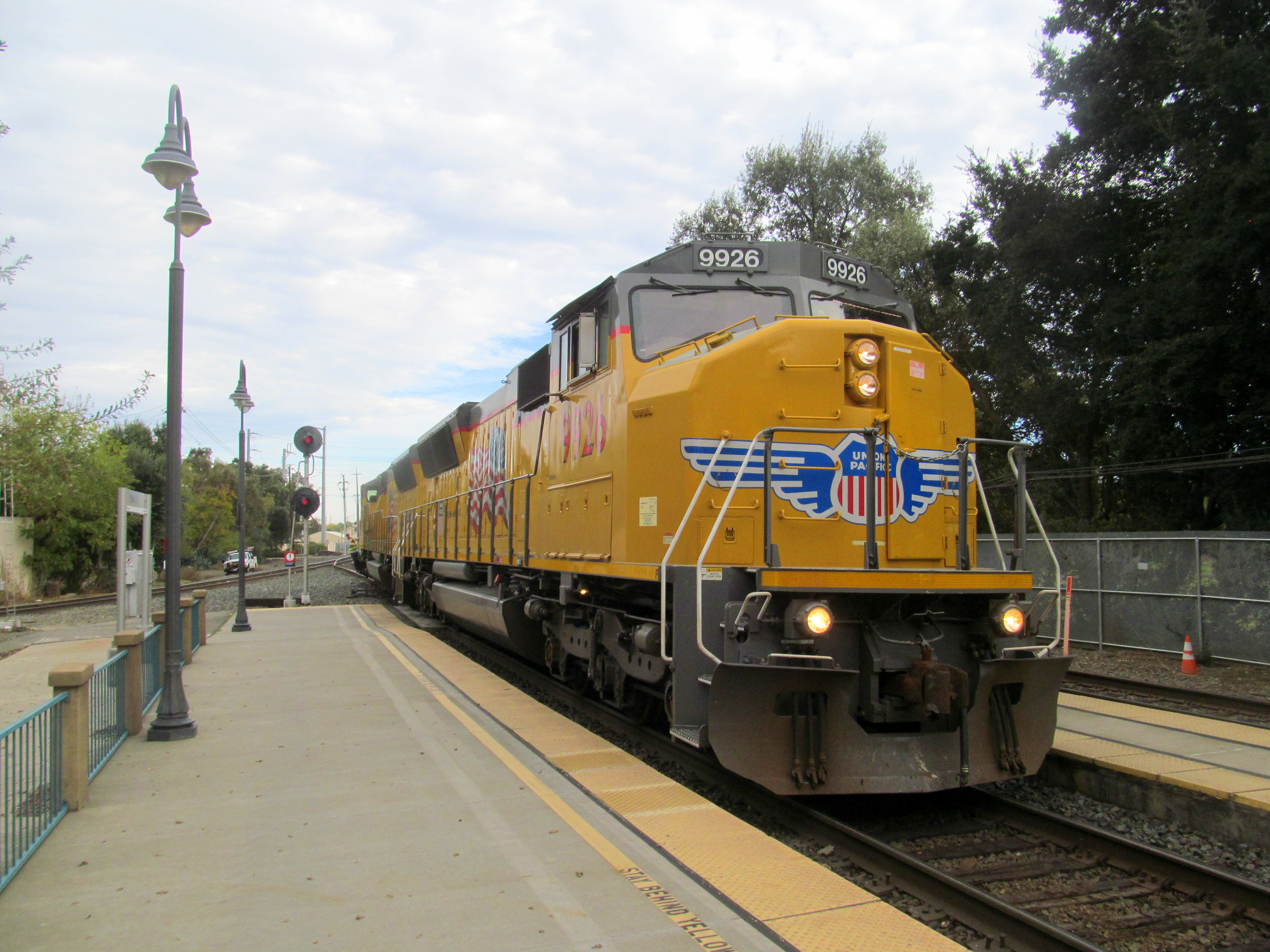
- SD59MX #9926 at Davis, California in 2017
Type and origin
- Power type: Diesel-electric
- Builder: Electro-Motive Diesel (EMD)
Specifications
- Configuration
  - AAR: C-C
- Gauge: 4 ft 8 1/2 in (1,435 mm)
- Prime mover: EMD 12-710G3A-T2
- Cylinders: V12
Performance figures
- Power output: 3,150 hp (2,350 kW)

The EMD SD32ECO is a 3,150 hp (2,350 kW) C-C diesel-electric locomotive rebuilt by Electro-Motive Diesel (EMD). It is primarily the application of a conversion kit to an existing EMD SD60 or EMD SD45-2-type locomotive. This involves replacing the existing 710G3A V16 prime mover with an EPA Tier-II-compliant 710G3A-T2 turbocharged V12 engine, with electronic fuel injection. Many of the donor locomotive's major components and subsystems are recycled, and are recertified as equal to new. However, the locomotive's control system is all new.

== Owners ==
Starting in 2011, twenty eight Union Pacific SD60Ms were sent to EMD for this rebuild that were also designated as SD59M–2. They are reporting mark numbered UP 9900-9927 with the majority in storage as of 2023. SD59MX is the Union Pacific designation for this type.

BNSF sent three SD45-2 locomotives to be rebuilt as SD32ECOs. Unlike UP's SD59MX, BNSF's SD32ECOs retain the appearance of an SD45-2. They were completed as reporting marks BNSF 1350-1352.

=== SD59M–2 / UP SD59MX Features ===
The SD59MX is remanufactured from the carbody and major mechanical and electrical subsystems of an EMD SD60M "donor". The EFI-equipped 710 engine, however, is all new as are the engine and locomotive control systems. Union Pacific was the first Class I railroad to order them. The engine control system is adaptable to both minimum emissions and minimum fuel consumption modes, depending upon their assignment.

== Appearance ==
The external appearance of the converted locomotive is sometimes altered by application of a flared radiator section, similar to the SD70M-2 and SD70ACe Tier-II, and similar to late model SD70M and SD70MAC locomotives in appearance. The converted Union Pacific locomotives have also had the SD70M-2/SD70ACe-style safety fuel tanks applied.
