= Union Pacific Railroad =

Class I freight railroad in the United States

Union Pacific Railroad Company

- System map (trackage rights in purple)

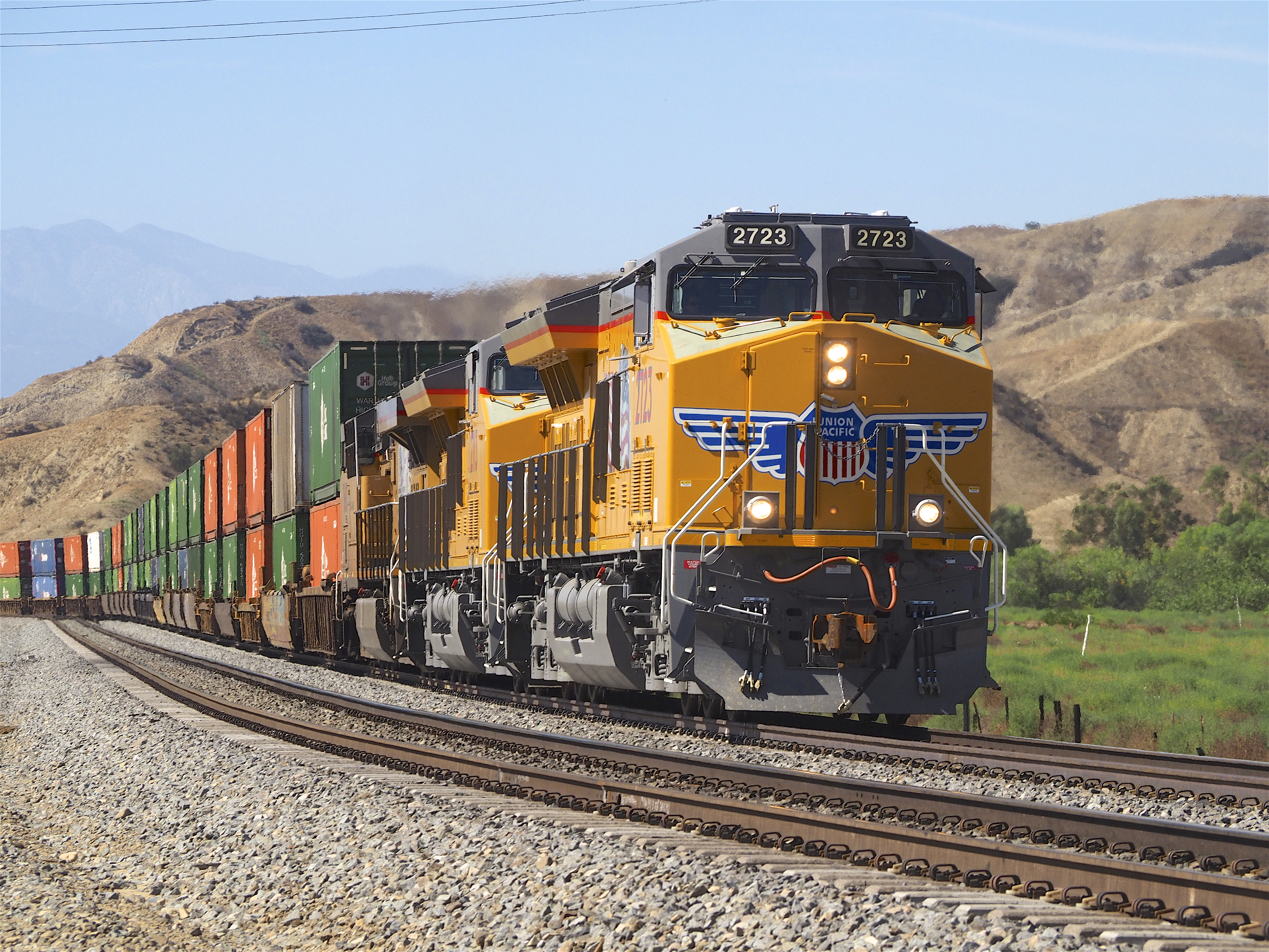
- UP #2723, a GE ET44AC, leading an intermodal train eastbound near inland California.

Overview
- Parent company: Union Pacific Corporation
- Headquarters: Union Pacific Center, Omaha, Nebraska, United States
- Key people: Thomas C. Durant Vice President & General Manager (1863-1869); Grenville M. Dodge, Chief Engineer (1866-1870); E.H. Harriman, Chairman of the Board (1898-1909) & President (1901-1909)
- Founders: Abraham Lincoln, United States Congress
- CEO: Jim Vena
- Reporting mark: UP (road locomotives); UPP (passenger cars); UPY (yard locomotives)
- Locale: Western, Midwestern and Southern United States
- Dates of operation: 1862–present: First company, Union Pacific Rail Road: 1862–1880; Second company, Union Pacific Railway: 1880–1897; Third company, Union Pacific Railroad (Mark I): 1897–1998; Fourth company, Union Pacific Railroad (Mark II): 1969–present (originally Southern Pacific Transportation Company until 1998; renamed Union Pacific during UP-SP merger)

Technical
- Track gauge: 4 ft 8 1/2 in (1,435 mm) standard gauge
- Length: 32,100 miles (51,700 km)

Other
- Website: up.com

The Union Pacific Railroad Company (reporting marks UP, UPP, UPY) is a Class I freight-hauling railroad that operates 8,300 locomotives over 32,200 miles (51,800 km) routes in 23 U.S. states west of Chicago and New Orleans. Union Pacific is the second-largest railroad in the United States after BNSF.

Founded in 1862, the original Union Pacific Rail Road was part of the first transcontinental railroad project, later known as the Overland Route. Over the next century, UP absorbed the Missouri Pacific Railroad, the Western Pacific Railroad, the Missouri–Kansas–Texas Railroad and the Chicago, Rock Island and Pacific Railroad. In 1995, the Union Pacific merged with Chicago and North Western Transportation Company, completing its reach into the Upper Midwest. In 1996, the company merged with Southern Pacific Transportation Company, itself a giant system that was absorbed by the Denver and Rio Grande Western Railroad.

The Union Pacific Railroad Company is the principal operating company of Union Pacific Corporation, which are both headquartered at the Union Pacific Center, in Omaha, Nebraska.

Union Pacific has announced plans to acquire the Norfolk Southern Railway in a deal worth $85 billion. If approved by regulators, it would create the first transcontinental railroad network in the United States.

== History ==
=== Union Pacific in the 19th century ===
The original company, the "Union Pacific Rail Road", was incorporated on July 1, 1862, under the Pacific Railroad Act of 1862. President Abraham Lincoln had approved the act, which authorized railroad construction from the Missouri River to the Pacific to ensure the stability of the Union throughout the American Civil War, but construction was not completed until after the conflict's conclusion.

Under the original bill that formed the basis of the 1862 Pacific Railroad Act, the Union Pacific Railroad was to be built from the Nevada–Utah border in the west to the Colorado–Kansas border in the east. However, due to intense lobbying by Dr. Thomas Clark Durant, the eastern terminal was moved to a location where the Union Pacific could link up with the Mississippi and Missouri Railroad in Iowa. Following the Act's passage, commissioners appointed by Congress began selling stock in the federally chartered Union Pacific Railroad Company. By 1863, Durant had organized the purchase of 2,000 shares, the prerequisite amount of stock sold in order to begin the railroad's construction.

The resulting track ran westward from Council Bluffs, Iowa, to meet in Utah the Central Pacific Railroad line, which had been constructed eastward from Sacramento, California. The combined Union Pacific–Central Pacific line became known as the first transcontinental railroad and later the Overland Route.

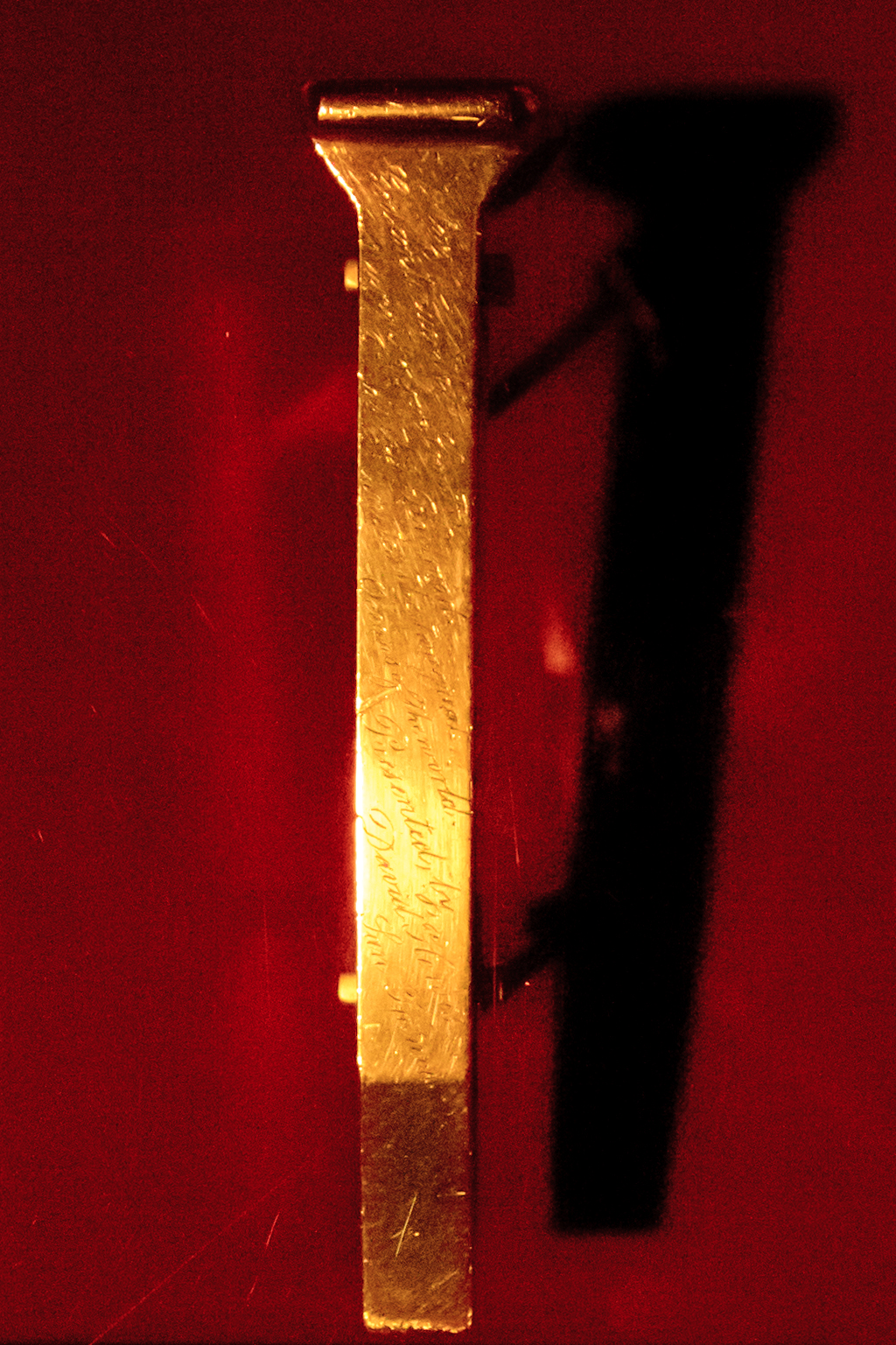
The original "golden spike", on display at the Cantor Arts Museum at Stanford University

The line was constructed primarily by Irish labor who had learned their craft during the recent Civil War. Under the guidance of its dominant stockholder, Thomas C. Durant, the namesake of the city of Durant, Iowa, the first rails were laid in Omaha. The two lines were joined at Promontory Summit, Utah, 53 miles (85 km) west of Ogden on May 10, 1869, creating the first transcontinental railroad in North America. Leland Stanford, founder of the Central Pacific Railroad which itself eventually was merged with Union Pacific, himself drove the golden spike, inscribed with the words "to span the continent and wed the oceans".

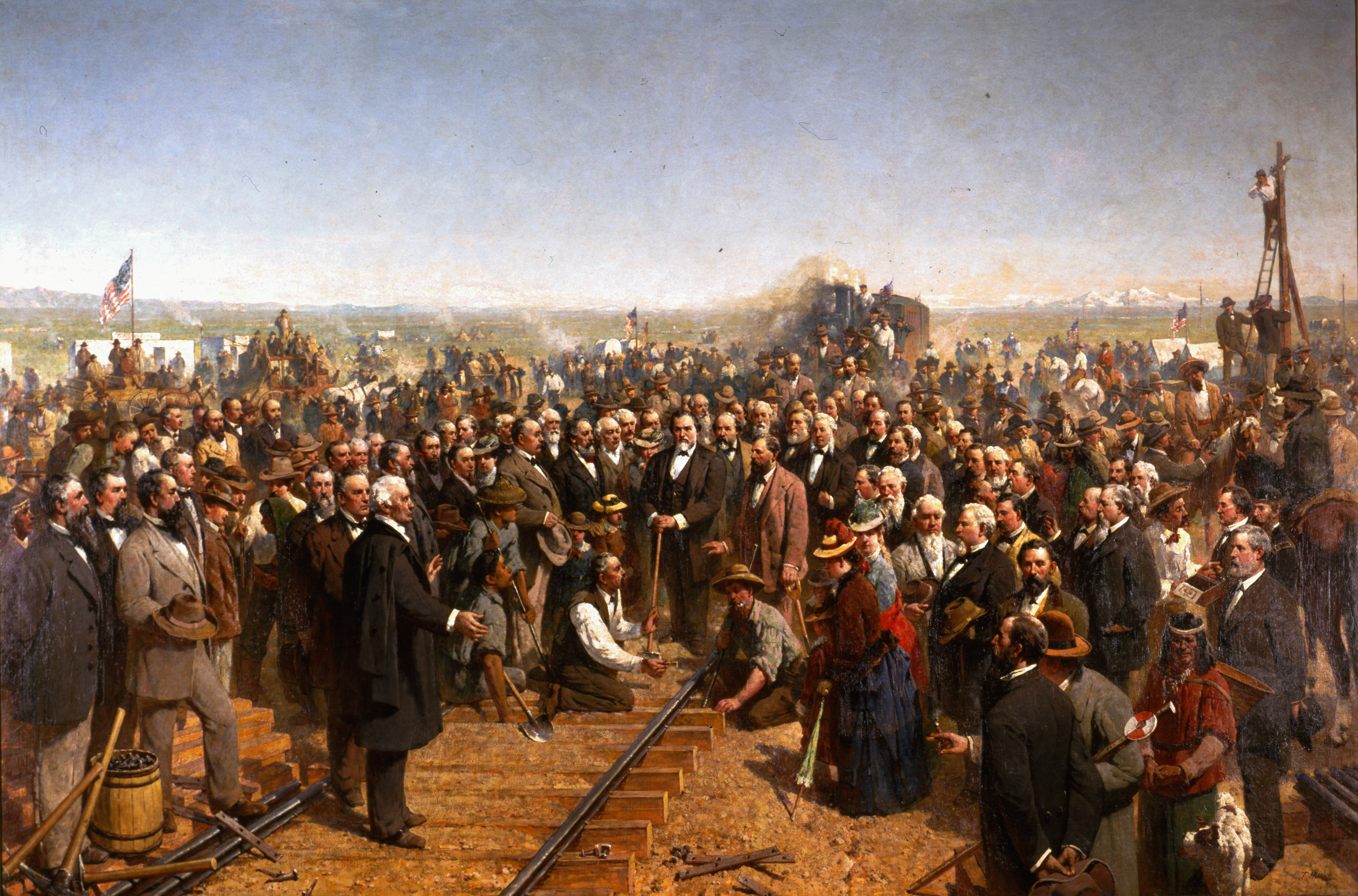
The Last Spike, by Thomas Hill (1881)

Subsequently, the UP purchased three Mormon-built, narrow-gauge roads: the Utah Central Railroad extending south from Ogden to Salt Lake City, the Utah Southern Railroad extending south from Salt Lake City into the Utah Valley, and the Utah Northern Railroad extending north from Ogden into Idaho.

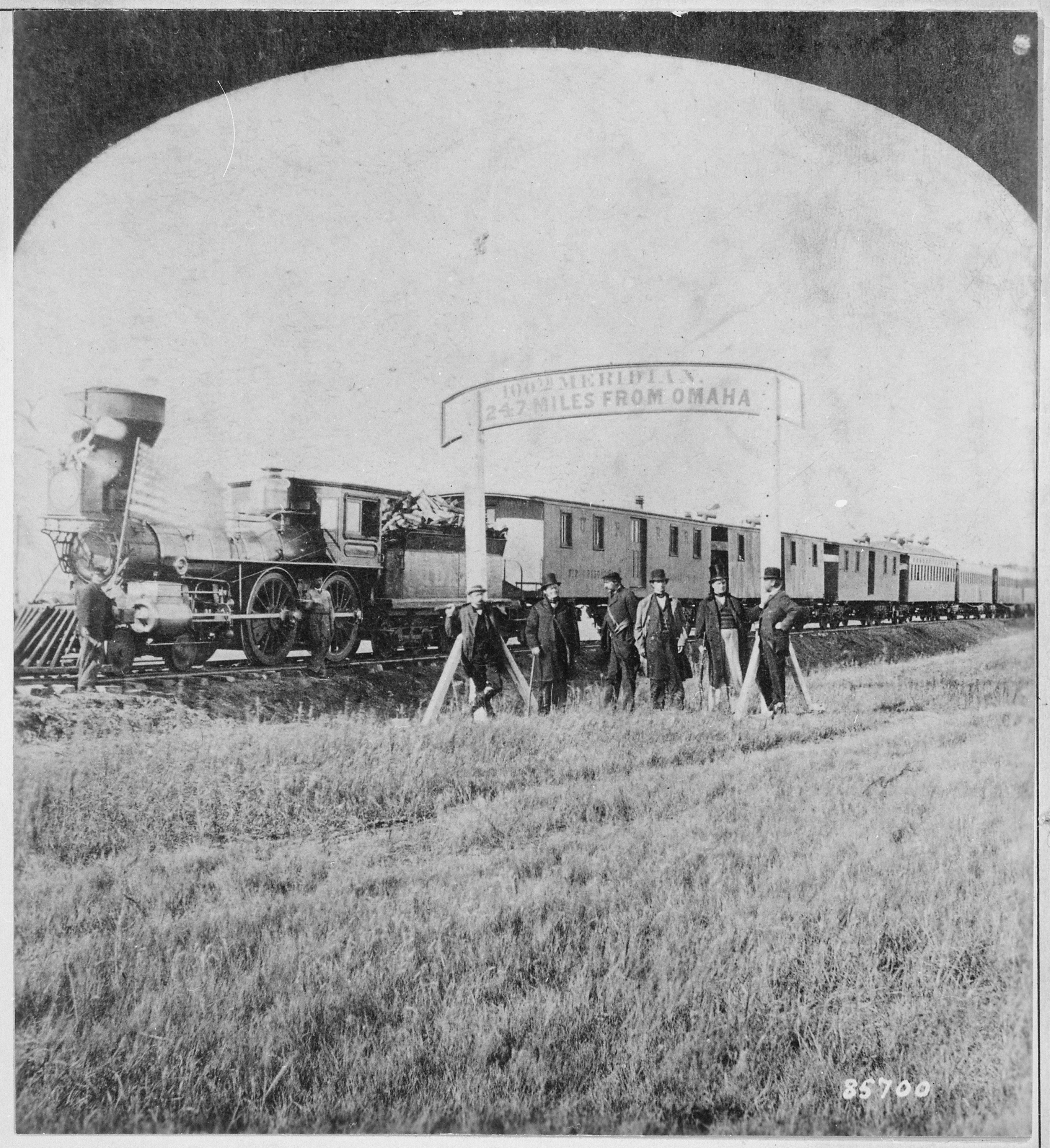
Directors of the Union Pacific Railroad gather on the 100th meridian, which later became Cozad, Nebraska, about 250 miles (400 km) west of Omaha in the Nebraska Territory, in October 1866. The train in the background awaits the party of Eastern capitalists, newspapermen, and other prominent figures invited by the railroad executives.

The UP also purchased the Utah Eastern Railroad and Utah Western Railroad, both Mormon narrow-gauge lines.

The original UP was entangled in the Crédit Mobilier scandal, exposed in 1872. As detailed by the New York Sun, Union Pacific's largest construction company, Crédit Mobilier, had overcharged Union Pacific; the railroad would then pass the inflated costs on to the United States government. To convince the federal government to accept the increased costs, Crédit Mobilier had bribed multiple congressmen. Several prominent UP board members (including Durant) had been involved in the scheme. The ensuing financial crisis of 1873 led to a credit crunch, but not bankruptcy.

As boom followed bust, the Union Pacific continued to expand. A new company, with dominant stockholder Jay Gould, purchased the old on January 24, 1880. Gould already owned the Kansas Pacific (originally called the Union Pacific, Eastern Division, though in essence a separate railroad), and sought to merge it with UP. Through that merger, the original "Union Pacific Rail Road" transformed into "Union Pacific Railway".

Gold Bond of the Union Pacific Railroad Company, issued 1 July 1897

Extending towards the Pacific Northwest, Union Pacific built or purchased local lines to reach Portland, Oregon. Towards Colorado, it built the Union Pacific, Denver and Gulf Railway: a system combining narrow-gauge trackage into the heart of the Rockies and a standard gauge line that ran south from Denver, across New Mexico, and into Texas.

The Union Pacific Railway would later declare bankruptcy during the Panic of 1893. The resulting corporate reorganization reversed Gould's name change: Union Pacific "Railway" merged into a new Union Pacific "Railroad".

=== Union Pacific in the 20th century ===
In the early 20th century, Union Pacific's focus shifted from expansion to internal improvement. Recognizing that farmers in the Central and Salinas Valleys of California grew produce far in excess of local markets, Union Pacific worked with its rival Southern Pacific to develop a spoilage-resistant rail-based transport system. These efforts culminated in the 1906 founding of Pacific Fruit Express, soon to be the world's largest lessee of refrigerated railcars.

Meanwhile, Union Pacific worked to construct a faster, and more direct substitute for the original climb to Promontory Summit. In 1904, the Lucin cutoff opened, reducing curvature and grades. The original route would eventually be stripped of track in 1942 to provide war scrap.

To attract customers during the Great Depression, Union Pacific's chairman W. Averell Harriman simultaneously sought to "spruce up" the quality of its rolling stock and to make its unique locations more desirable travel destinations. The first effort resulted in the purchase of the first streamlined train: the M-10000. The latter resulted in the Sun Valley ski resort in central Idaho; it opened in 1936 and finally was sold in 1964. Despite the fact that the M-10000 and its successors were among the first diesel locomotives, Union Pacific completed dieselization relatively late. In 1944, UP finally received delivery of its last steam locomotive: Union Pacific 844.

As the 20th century waned, Union Pacific recognized—like most railroads—that remaining a regional railroad would only lead to bankruptcy. On December 31, 1925, UP and its subsidiaries operated 9,834 miles (15,826 km) routes and 15,265 miles (24,567 km) tracks; in 1980, these numbers had remained roughly constant (9,266 route-miles and 15,647 track-miles). But in 1982, UP acquired the Missouri Pacific and Western Pacific railroads, and 1988, the Missouri–Kansas–Texas. By 1993, Union Pacific had doubled its system to 17,385 miles (27,978 km) routes.

By then, few large (class I) railroads remained. The same year that Union Pacific merged with the Chicago and North Western (1995), Burlington Northern and ATSF announced merger plans. The impending BNSF amalgamation would leave one mega-railroad in control of the west. To compete, UP merged with Southern Pacific, thereby incorporating D&RGW and Cotton Belt, and forming a duopoly in the West. The merged railroad took the Union Pacific name. As of 1999, the UP had 33,705 miles (54,243 km) of track, about 33,000 employees, nearly 7,000 locomotives and over 155,000 rail cars.

Revenue passenger traffic, in millions of passenger-miles (Note: Includes subsidiaries Oregon Short Line Railroad, Oregon Railroad and Navigation Company, Los Angeles and Salt Lake Railroad, and St. Joseph and Grand Island Railway, but not jointly-owned subsidiaries Spokane International Railroad or Mount Hood Railroad.)
Year	Traffic
1925 (Note: Does not include LNP&W, S&EV, or P&IN)	1,065
1933	436
1944	5,481
1960	1,233
1970	333

Revenue freight ton-miles (millions) (Note: Does not include jointly-owned subsidiaries Spokane International Railroad or Mount Hood Railroad; entry for 1993 includes all subsidiaries)
	UP (Note: Includes subsidiaries Oregon Short Line Railroad, Oregon Railroad and Navigation Company, Los Angeles and Salt Lake Railroad, and St. Joseph and Grand Island Railway.)	LNP&W	S&EV	P&IN
1925	12,869	10		3
1933	8,639	4	0.4	(into UP)
1944	37,126	7	0.7	
1960	33,280	(into UP)	(into UP)	
1970	47,575			
1979	73,708			
1993	220,697			

=== Union Pacific in the 21st century ===
In March 2024, Union Pacific layoffs caused concern at the Federal Railroad Administration to the extent that the FRA, in a letter to UP's CEO, said "safety of railroad operations is paramount ... decisions that comprise that fundamental ... are unacceptable. You must ensure that highly trained and experienced personnel perform critical inspections and repairs .... Your railroad (layoffs) are far outpacing any of your Class 1 peers."

In 2024, the railway celebrated 150 years of having its headquarters in Omaha.

The railway's Big Boy #4014, the world's largest operating steam locomotive, visited 14 states throughout the Midwest in 2024. Twenty-five Big Boys were built during World War II, with only eight surviving and #4014 the only operable one, restored by the railroad to join its Heritage Fleet. Its "Heartland of America" tour began in August 2024 in Cheyenne, Wyoming, and travelled through Arkansas, Colorado, Illinois, Iowa, Kansas, Missouri, Nebraska, Oklahoma and Texas through October.

Three commemorative locomotives honor U.S. Presidents, including UP No. 4141, named in honor of George H. W. Bush, the 41st President. It is exhibited at the George H. W. Bush Presidential Center at Texas A&M University in College Station, Texas. The locomotive is custom painted in the colors of GWH Bush's Air Force One. The engine also pulled the president's funeral train on his final journey to College Station in 2018. UP No. 1616, honoring railroad founder President Abraham Lincoln, was unveiled on Presidents Day 2025. The Lincoln Locomotive will serve as a traveling ambassador on the rails. The third locomotive, UP No. 4547 honoring President Donald J. Trump, was created to celebrate America's 250th anniversary in 2026. The locomotive began its first mission hauling Space Launch System solid rocket motor segments for NASA's Artemis III lunar exploration program.

==== Proposed merger ====
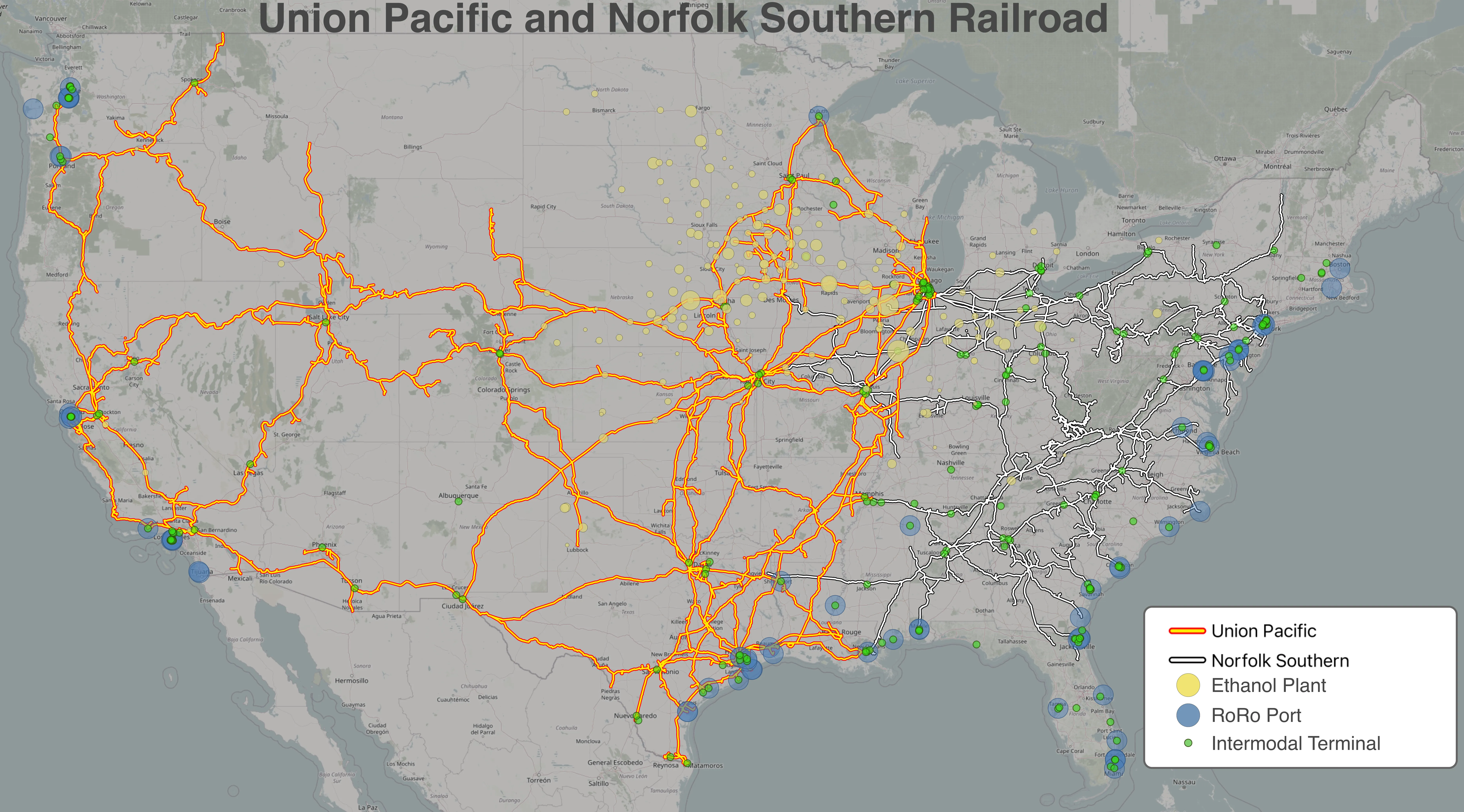
Union Pacific and Norfolk Southern Railroads

On July 29, 2025, Union Pacific and Norfolk Southern announced an $85 billion agreement to create a transcontinental railroad. The boards of both companies unanimously approved the transaction, which remains subject to review by the Surface Transportation Board. If approved, the combined network would encompass more than 50,000 route miles across 43 states and connect approximately 100 ports in the United States.

== Lobbying and political influence ==
In 2025, Union Pacific was one of the donors who funded the White House's East Wing demolition and planned building of a ballroom.

== Facilities ==
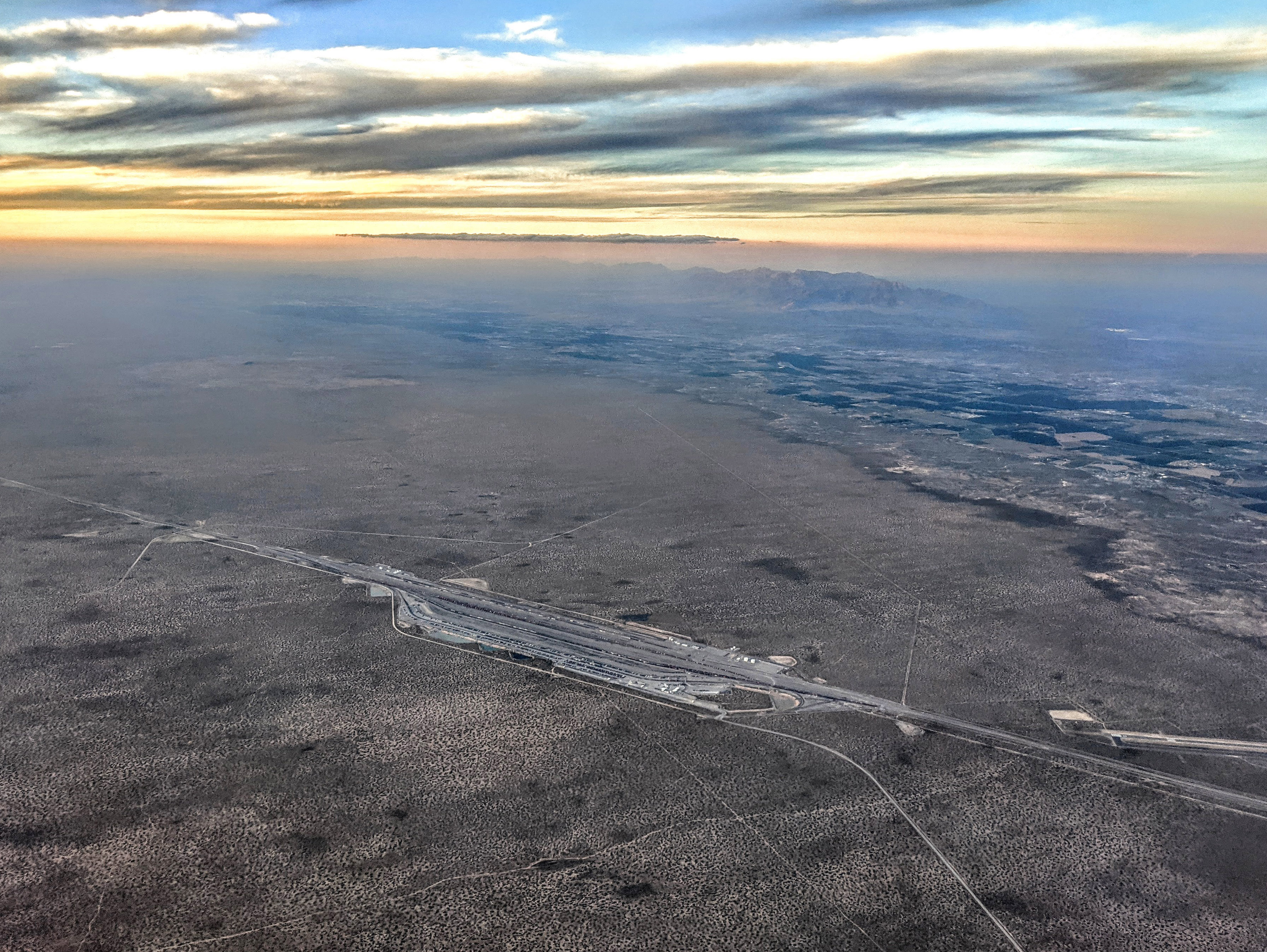
The intermodal terminal just outside Santa Teresa, New Mexico, used for exchanging freight with trucks from Mexico

The Union Pacific system includes hundreds of yards. Most are flat yards used for local switching. Other types of yards include intermodal terminals and hump yards. Most UP intermodal terminals are typically ports, but UP also has inland terminals for transfers to trucks, such as the terminal in San Antonio that opened in 2009 or the one in Santa Teresa, New Mexico, that opened in 2014.

=== Hump yards ===
In 2006, Union Pacific had 11 major active hump yards:

- Bailey Yard in North Platte, Nebraska
- Beaumont Yard in Beaumont, Texas
- Davidson Yard in Fort Worth, Texas
- Davis Yard in Roseville, California
- Englewood Yard in Houston, Texas
- Gateway Yard in East St Louis, Illinois, owned by subsidiary Alton and Southern Railway
- Livonia Yard in Livonia, Louisiana
- North Little Rock Yard in North Little Rock, Arkansas
- Proviso Yard in Northlake, Illinois, owned by Chicago and North Western Transportation Company until 1995
- Strang Yard in La Porte, Texas
- West Colton Yard in Bloomington, California

In the late 2010s, Union Pacific began deactivating hump yards in favor of flat switching. In this, Union Pacific followed the industry-wide trend towards Precision Scheduled Railroading (PSR); railway executive Hunter Harrison explained that under PSR, few yards receive enough variegated traffic to necessitate a hump. Union Pacific also closed facilities in Kansas City ("Neff yard"), Hinkle, Oregon, and Pine Bluff, Arkansas in 2019.

== Locomotives and rolling stock ==
Union Pacific has owned some of the most powerful locomotives. These include members of the Challenger-type (including the 3985), and the Northern-type (including the 844), as well as the Big Boy steam locomotives (including the 4014). Union Pacific ordered the first diesel streamliner, the largest fleet of turbine-electric locomotives in the world, and the largest diesel locomotives ever built (including 6936).

=== Paint and colors ===
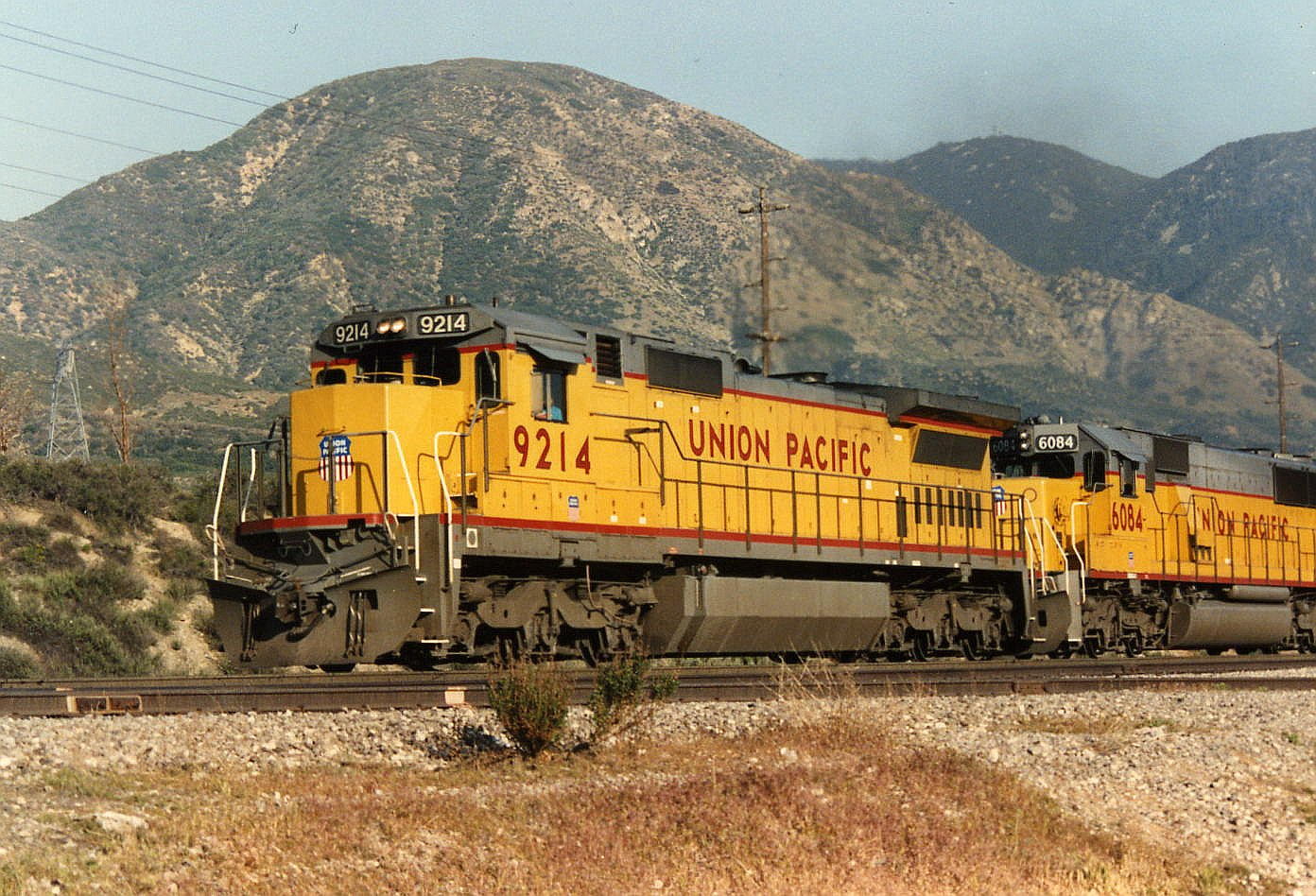
Union Pacific #9214, a GE Dash 8-40C, shows the standard UP diesel locomotive livery on May 10, 1991

The yellow paint scheme was introduced in the spring of 1934. Engineers claimed the visibility of yellow would reduce grade crossing accidents. In 1941, UP introduced its yellow and gray color scheme with red highlights, which remains in use today.

The middle two-thirds of the locomotive body is painted Armour Yellow, a color used by Armour and Company on the packaging of its meat products. A thin band of Signal Red divides this from the Harbor Mist Gray (a light gray) used for the body and roof above that point. There is also a thin band of Signal Red along the bottom of the locomotive body, but this color has gradually become yellow as new Federal Railroad Administration (FRA) regulations for reflectorized tape came into effect in 2005; the trucks (painted Aluminum from 1955 to 1982), underframe, fuel tanks and everything else beneath that line are also Harbor Mist Gray. Lettering and numbering are in Signal Red, with black outlines. Most locomotives have white-outlined blue "wings" on the nose, on either side of the renowned shield featuring white lettering on a blue background and, below it, red and white vertical stripes. Beginning in early 2002, a number of units were repainted with a large, billowing American flag with the corporate motto "Building America" on the side, where the 'UNION PACIFIC' lettering is normally positioned. This was done to honor the victims of the September 11, 2001 attacks. Over time, the large billowing flag became weathered and tattered due to engine exhaust and climate conditions; UP decided to place a miniature version of the American flag on the locomotives' noses instead.

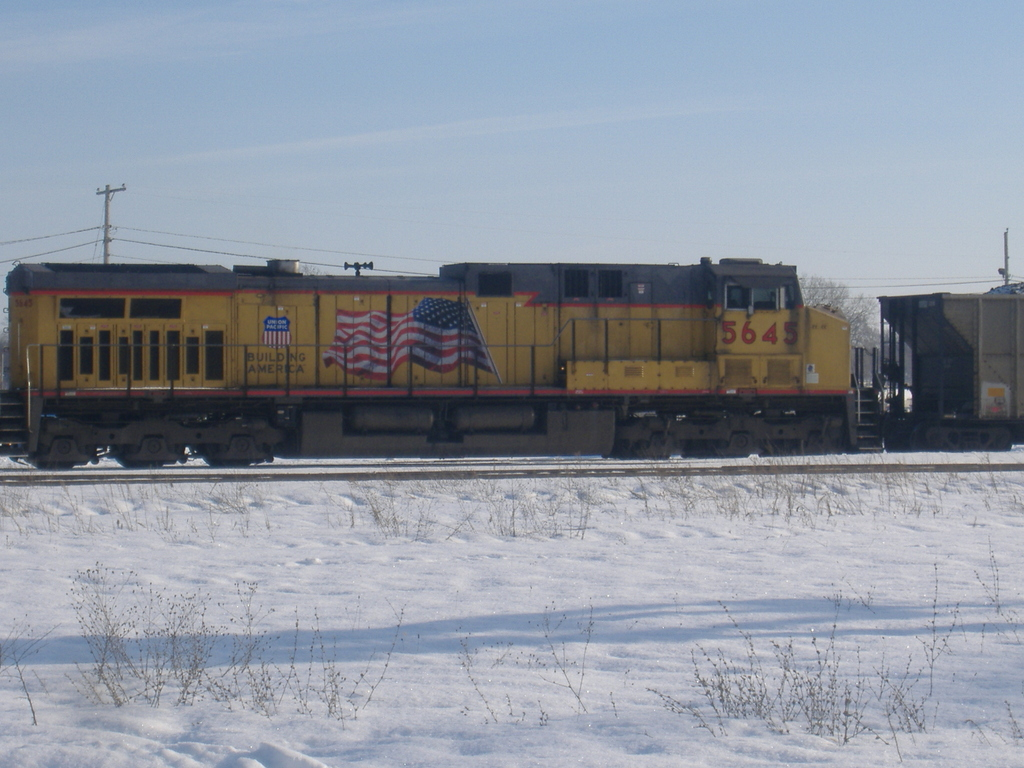
GE AC4400CW UP #5645 in Battle Creek, Michigan, with the Flags and Flares paint scheme

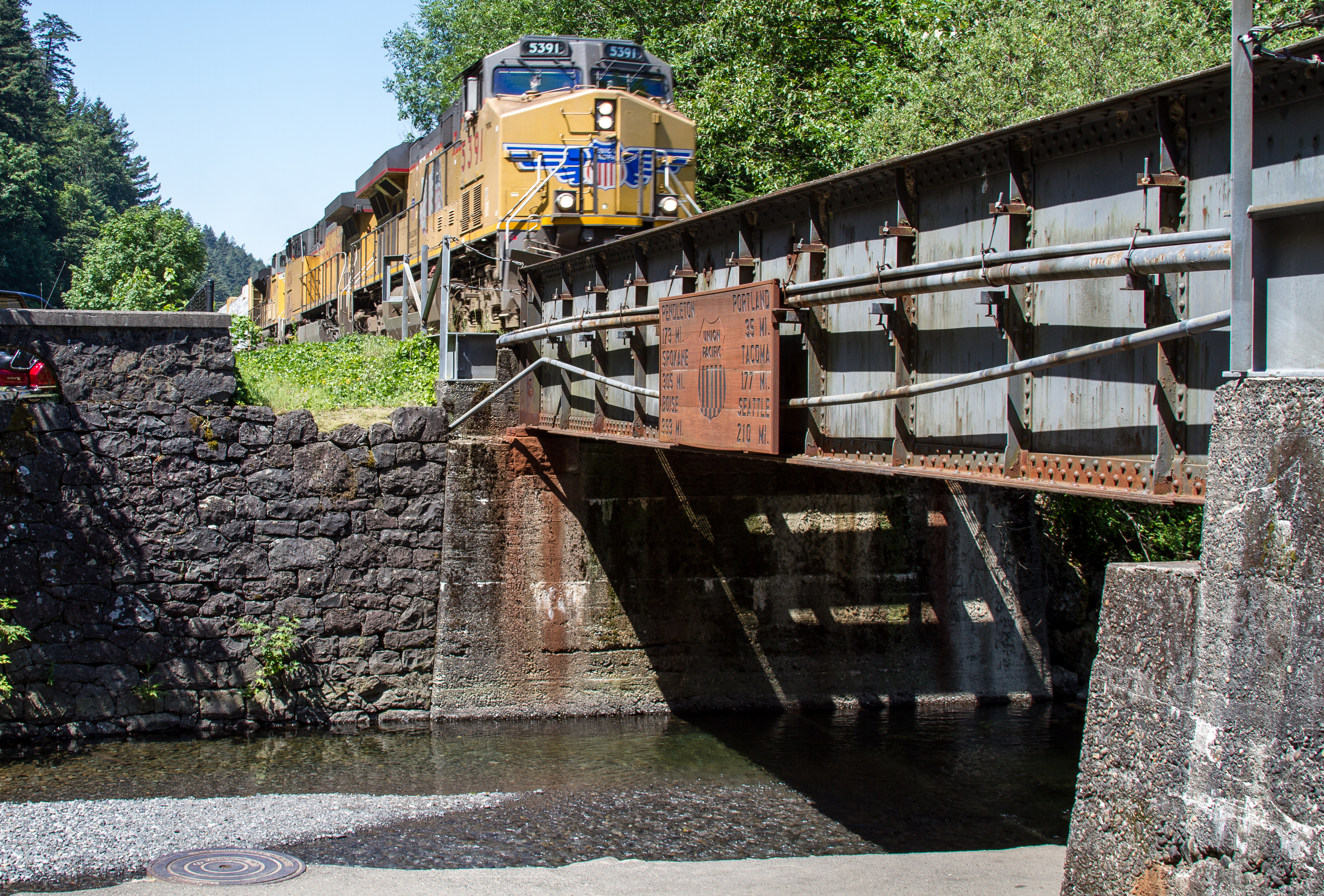
GE ES44AC Union Pacific #5391, approaching bridge at Multnomah Falls, Oregon, shows the white-outlined blue "wings" on the nose.

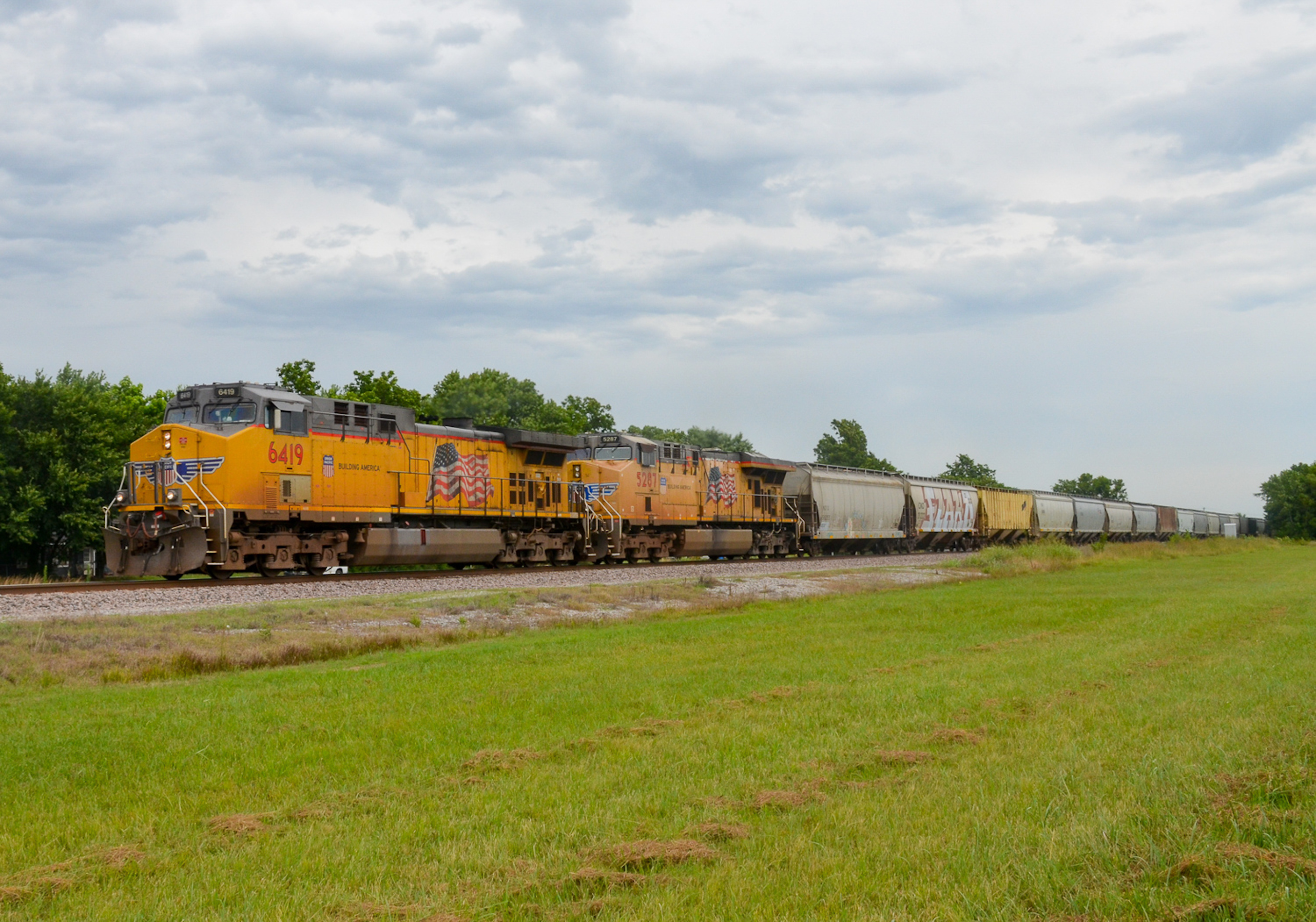
GE AC4400CW Union Pacific #6419, in Checotah, Oklahoma, with the Flags and Flares paint scheme leads a train on June 26, 2021

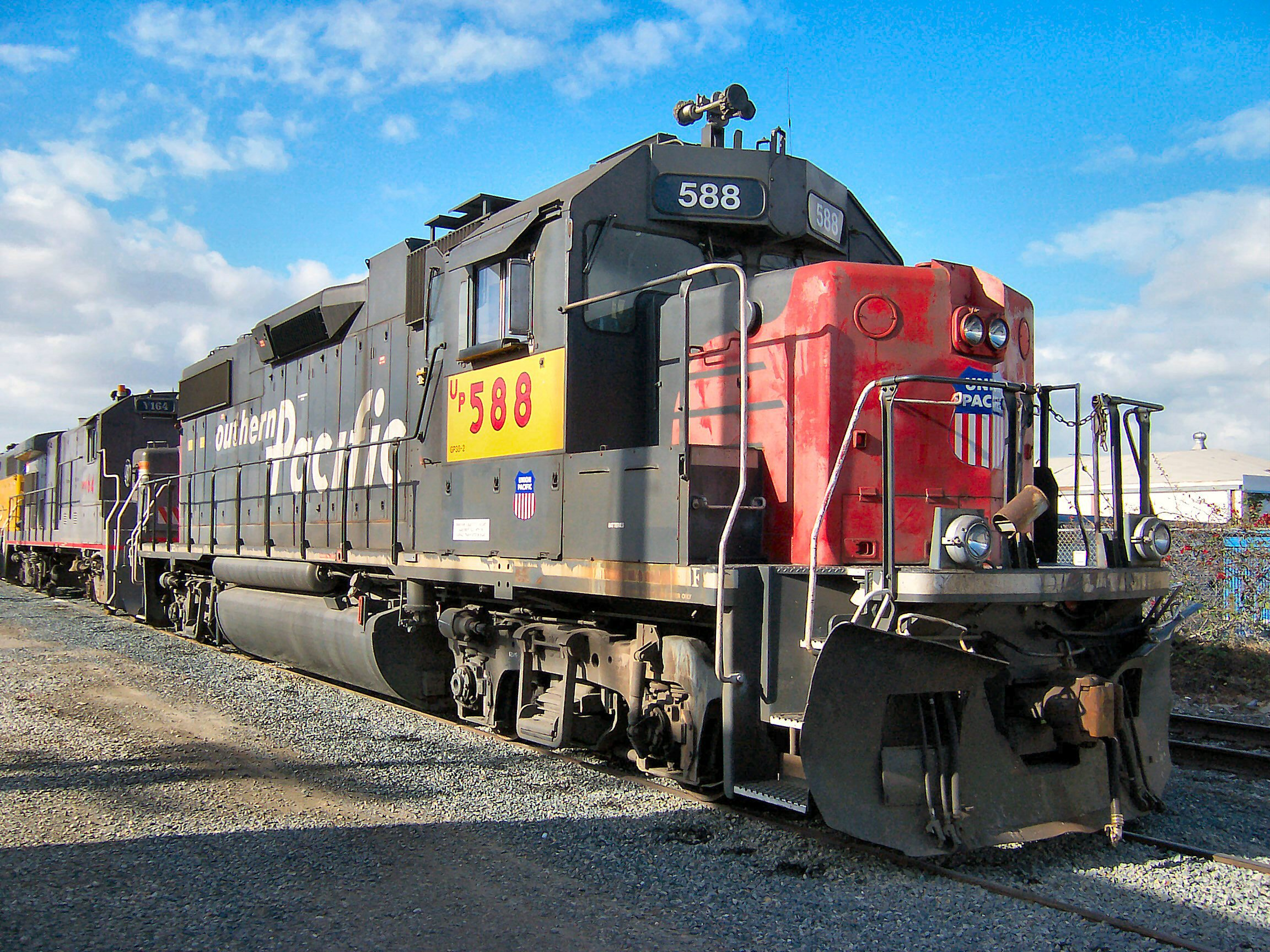
A former Southern Pacific GP38-2 locomotive renumbered with UP "patch" markings

In 2017, Union Pacific decided to repaint all locomotives which were not in the current corporate colors. As of March 2018, only 41 locomotives remained unpainted.

==== Commemorative color schemes ====
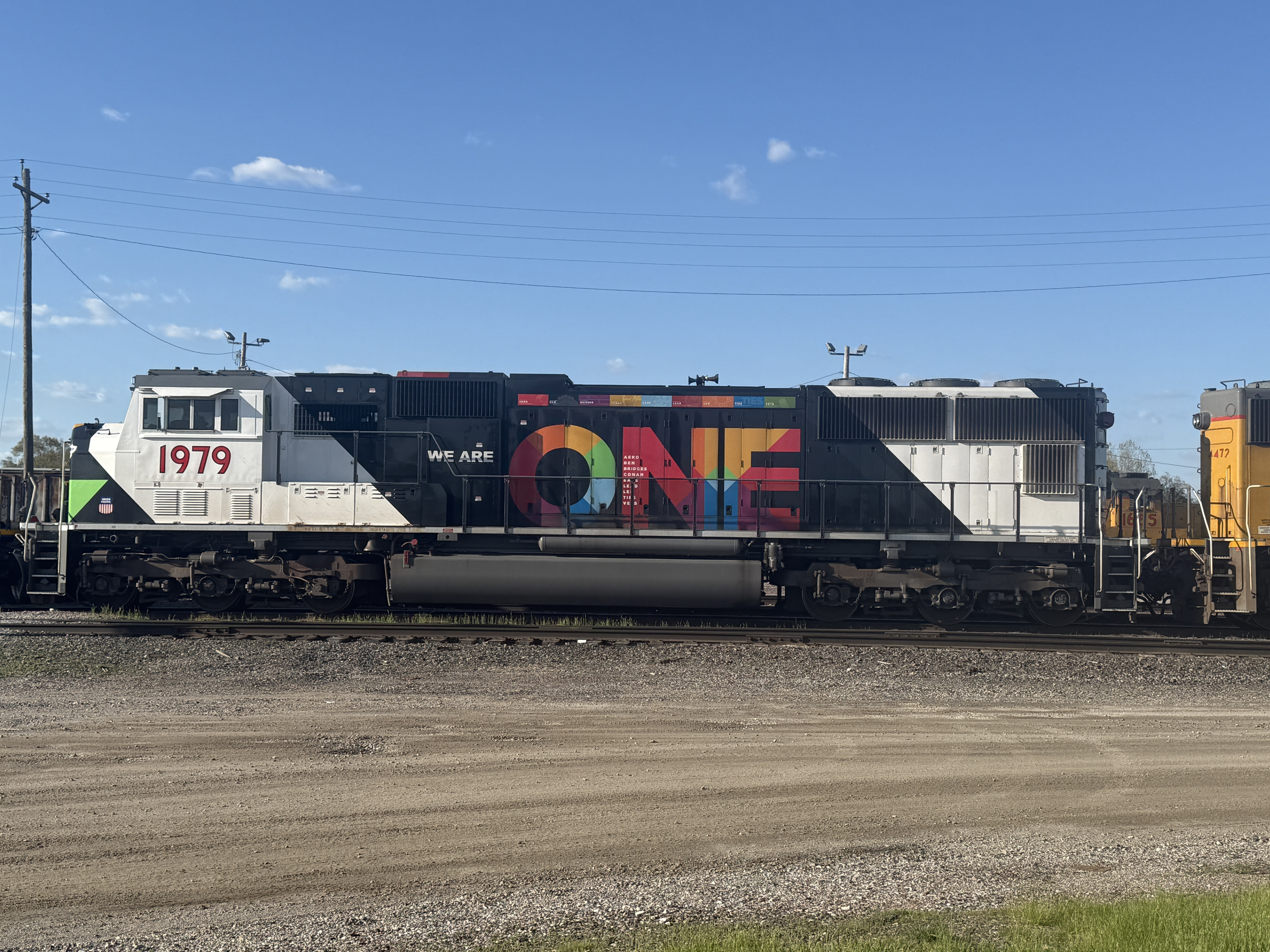
UP 1979, painted in a livery commemorating Union Pacific's Employee Resource Groups (2025)

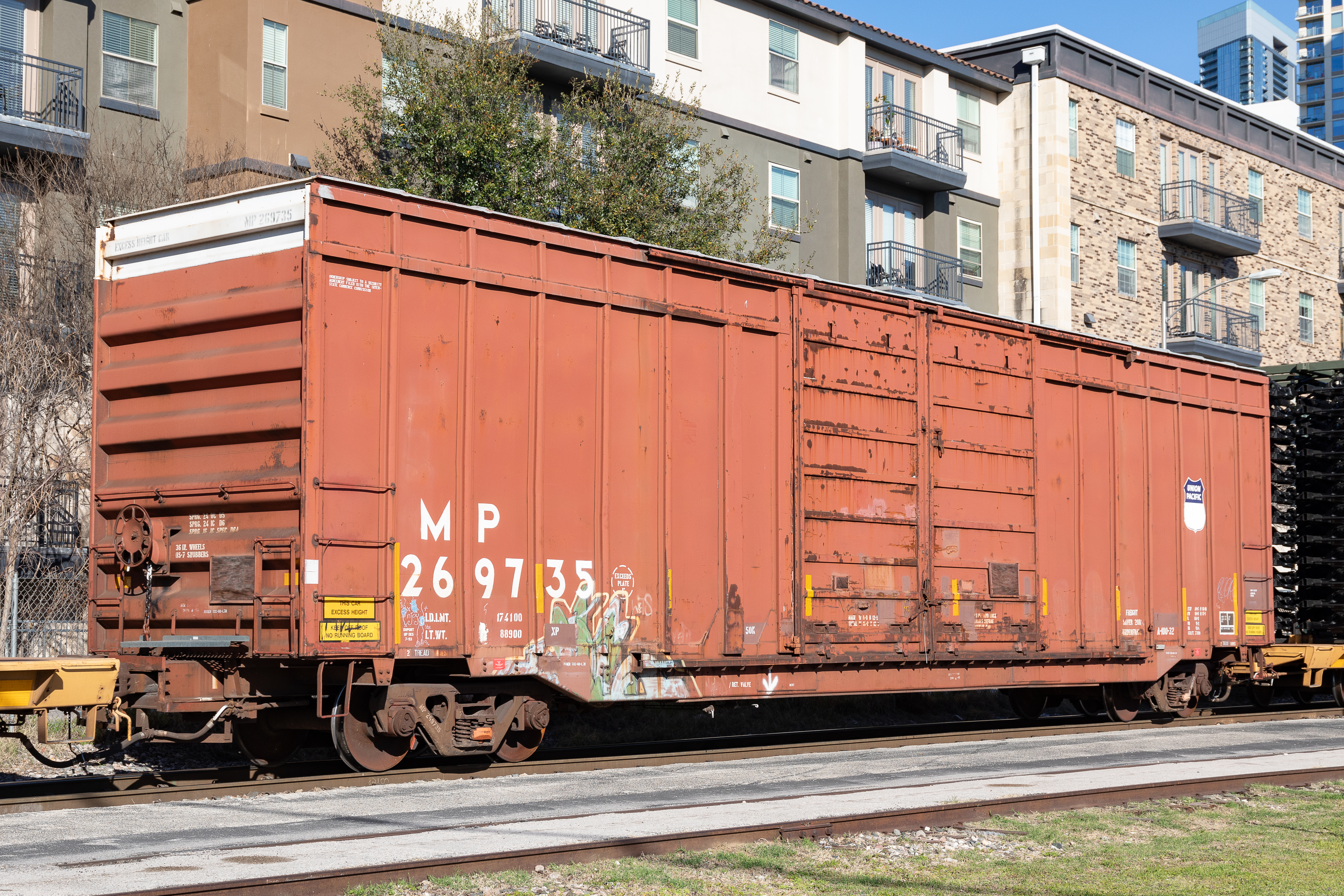
A boxcar with Missouri Pacific reporting marks, repainted with the UP shield logo.

From the second half of 2005 to the summer of 2006, UP unveiled a new set of six EMD SD70ACe locomotives in "Heritage Colors", painted in schemes reminiscent of railroads acquired by the Union Pacific Corporation since the 1980s. The engine numbers match the year that the predecessor railroad became part of the Union Pacific system. The locomotives commemorate the Missouri Pacific with UP 1982, the Western Pacific with UP 1983, the Missouri–Kansas–Texas with UP 1988, the Chicago and North Western with UP 1995, the Southern Pacific with UP 1996, and the Denver and Rio Grande Western with UP 1989.

In October 2005, UP unveiled SD70ACe 4141, commissioned in honor of George Bush. The locomotive has "George Bush 41" on the sides and its paint scheme resembles that of Air Force One. It was sent into storage in 2007, but returned in 2018 to power Bush's funeral train. It was donated to the George H. W. Bush Presidential Library and Museum on November 8, 2019.

On March 31, 2010, UP dedicated a specially painted GE ES44AC locomotive commemorating the centennial of the Boy Scouts of America.

On September 28, 2010, UP dedicated a specially painted GE ES44AC locomotive, as a tribute to Susan G. Komen for the Cure.

On October 19, 2017, Union Pacific unveiled SD70AH 1943, "The Spirit of the Union Pacific", which is painted in a scheme to honor the United States armed forces.

On June 6, 2019, Union Pacific unveiled SD70ACe 1111, the "Powered By Our People" unit.

In April 2021, Union Pacific repainted an SD70M, UP 1979, into a commemorative paint scheme called "We Are ONE" to honor Juneteenth and Pride Month.

UP also has a collection of locomotives painted for Operation Lifesaver, a rail safety organization founded in 1970.

=== Locomotive roster ===
As of December 2023, the Union Pacific had 7,175 locomotives on its active roster consisting of 42 different models.

Type	Quantity
C40-8	3
C40-8W	7
C41-8W	28
C44-9W	217
C44AC	511
C44ACCTE	543
C44ACM	655
C45ACCTE	937
C45AH	465
CCRCL	6
GP15-1	46
GP15N	22
GP22	10
GP38-2	85
GP38N	167
GP39-2	10
GP39N	7
GP40-2	61
GP40N	129
GP59ECO	1
GP60	137
GP60E	33
GP62	16
MP15AC	1
PS4B	1
PS6B	67
RP18G	14
SD40-2	2
SD40N	486
SD59MX	28
SD60	45
SD60E	1
SD60M	132
SD62	18
SD62E	13
SD70ACe	510
SD70ACe-T4	368
SD70M	1,365
SD9043AC	23
SNOW PLOW	1

==== Heritage equipment ====
Union Pacific continues to use a small number of "heritage" steam locomotives and early streamlined diesel locomotives. This equipment is used on special charters (excursions).

Type	Quantity
4-8-8-4 Big Boy	1
4-8-4 FEF-3	1
E9A	2
E9B	1

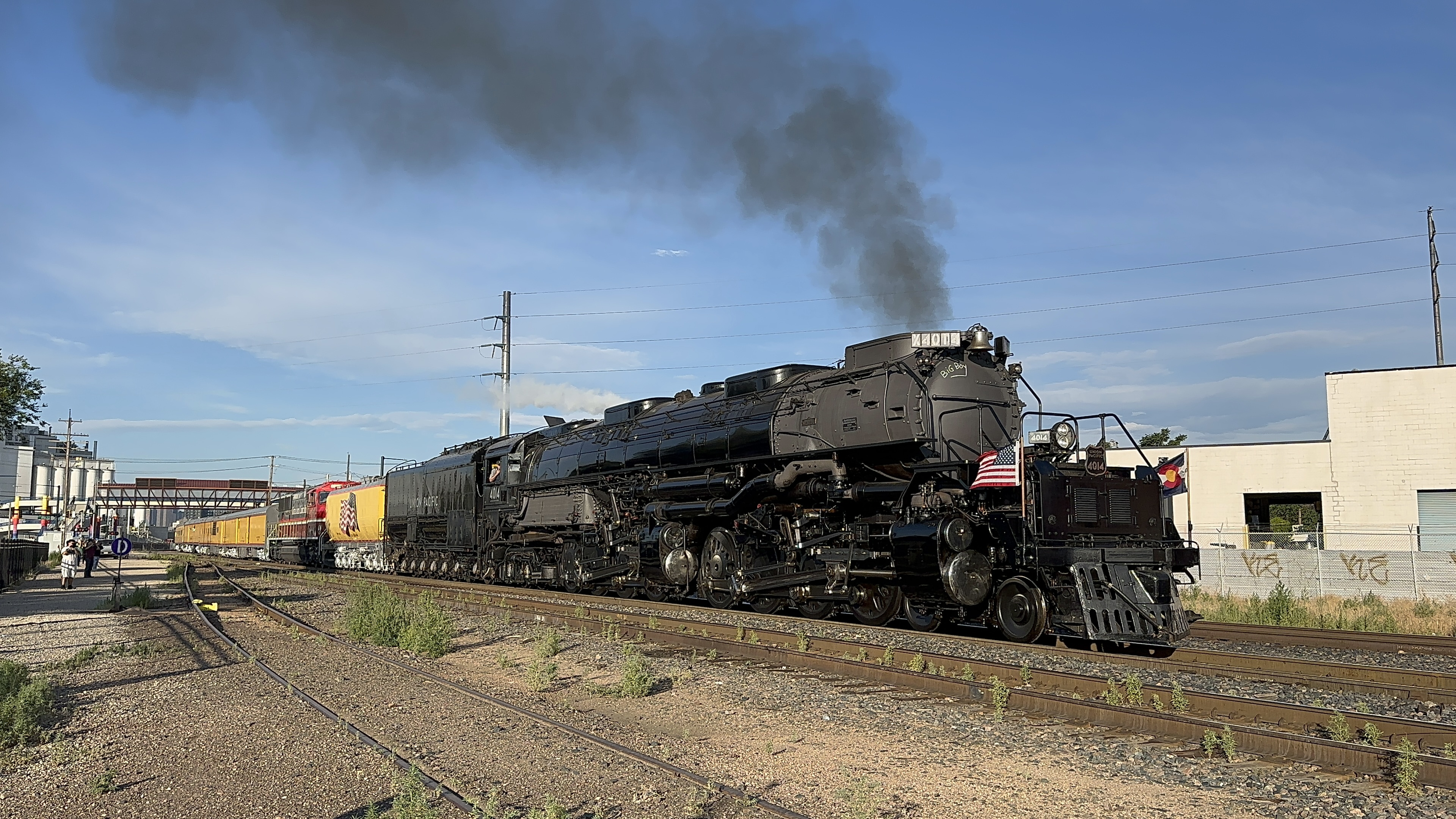
Big Boy #4014 departs Denver, Colorado, on July 19, 2025

==== Low-emissions locomotives ====
Union Pacific maintains a fleet of low-emissions locomotives. Most are used in Los Angeles basin rail yards to satisfy an air quality agreement with the local authorities.

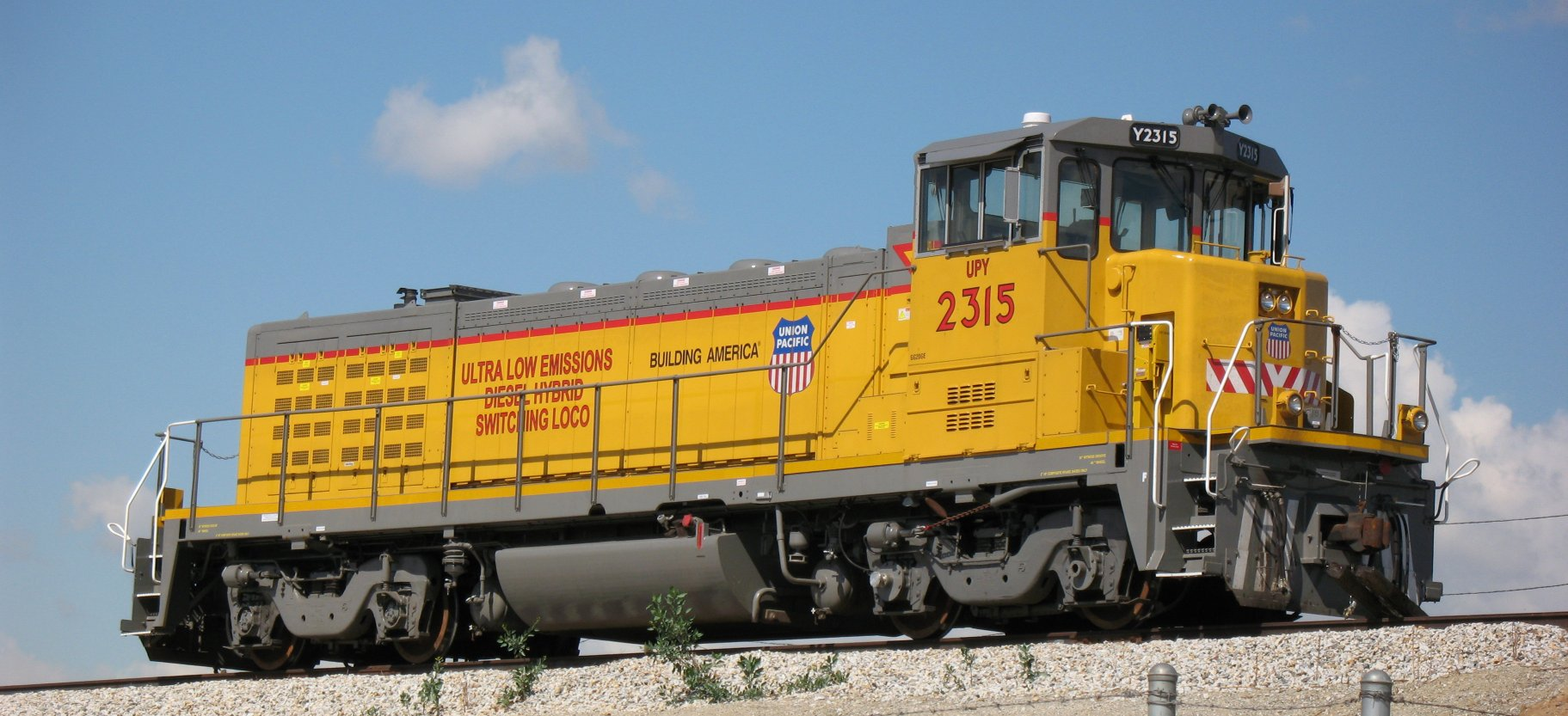
One of the 20 new 2,000 horsepower (1,500 kW) "Green Goat" locomotives manufactured for Union Pacific's "Green" Fleet by Railpower Technologies

Type	Quantity
2GS14B	1
GP22T4	10
MP20B	13
3GS21B	59
PR30C	≥6
GG20GE	21
Others	≤71

== Facts and figures ==
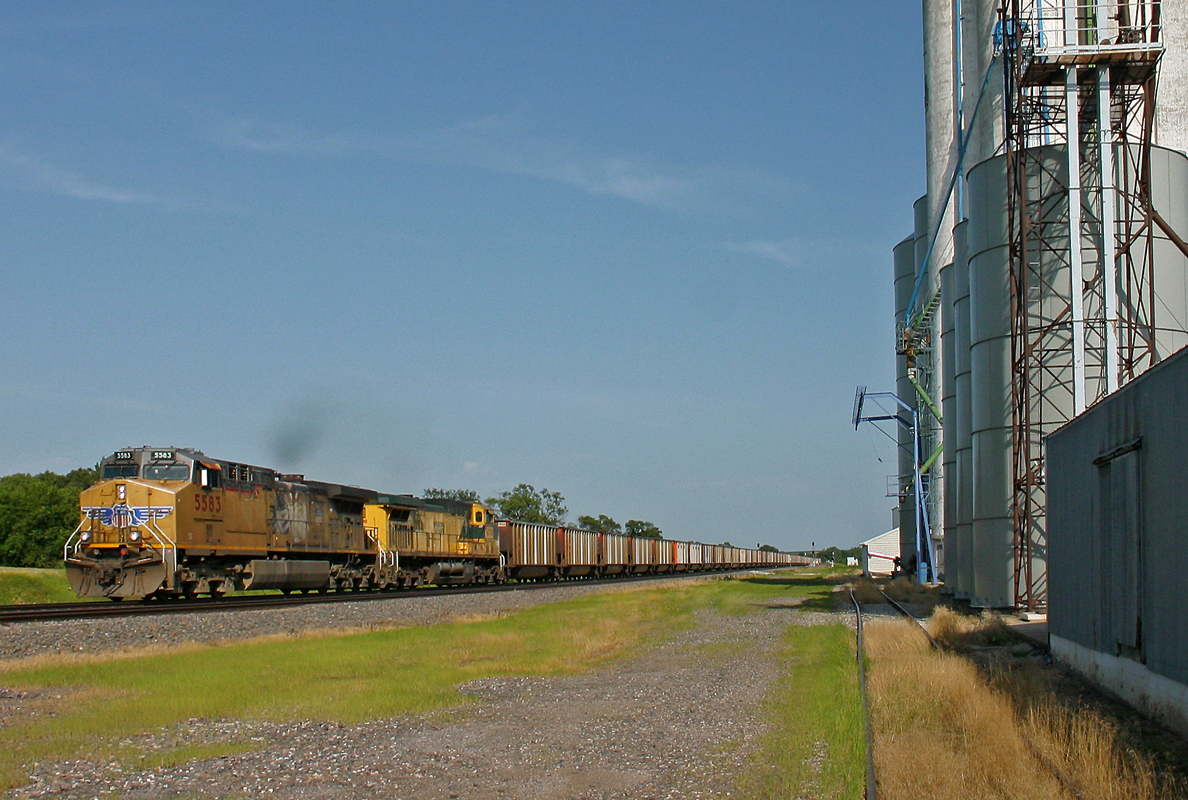
Two UP AC4400CWs, including an ex-CNW unit, lead a typical empty coal train west at Belvidere, Nebraska, in July 2015.

According to UP's 2007 Annual Report to Investors, at the end of 2007 it had more than 50,000 employees, 8,721 locomotives, and 94,284 freight cars.

Broken down by specific type of car, owned and leased:

- 35,437 covered hoppers
- 12,272 boxcars
- 18,647 open-top hoppers
- 13,780 gondolas
- 14,148 "other" types of cars

In addition, it owns 6,950 different pieces of maintenance of way work equipment. At the end of 2007, the average age of UP's locomotive fleet was 14.8 years, the freight car fleet 28 years.

UP was ranked 134th on the 2019 Fortune 500 list of the largest United States corporations by revenue and had 41,967 employees. The Chief Executive Officer of Union Pacific since August 14, 2023, is Jim Vena, and the chairman of the board is Mike McCarthy.

In 2019, Union Pacific has been rated the worst company to work for by 247wallst.com, citing Past CEO Lance Fritz's 12% approval rating and the 22% recommendation rating from Glassdoor.com.

== Passenger service ==
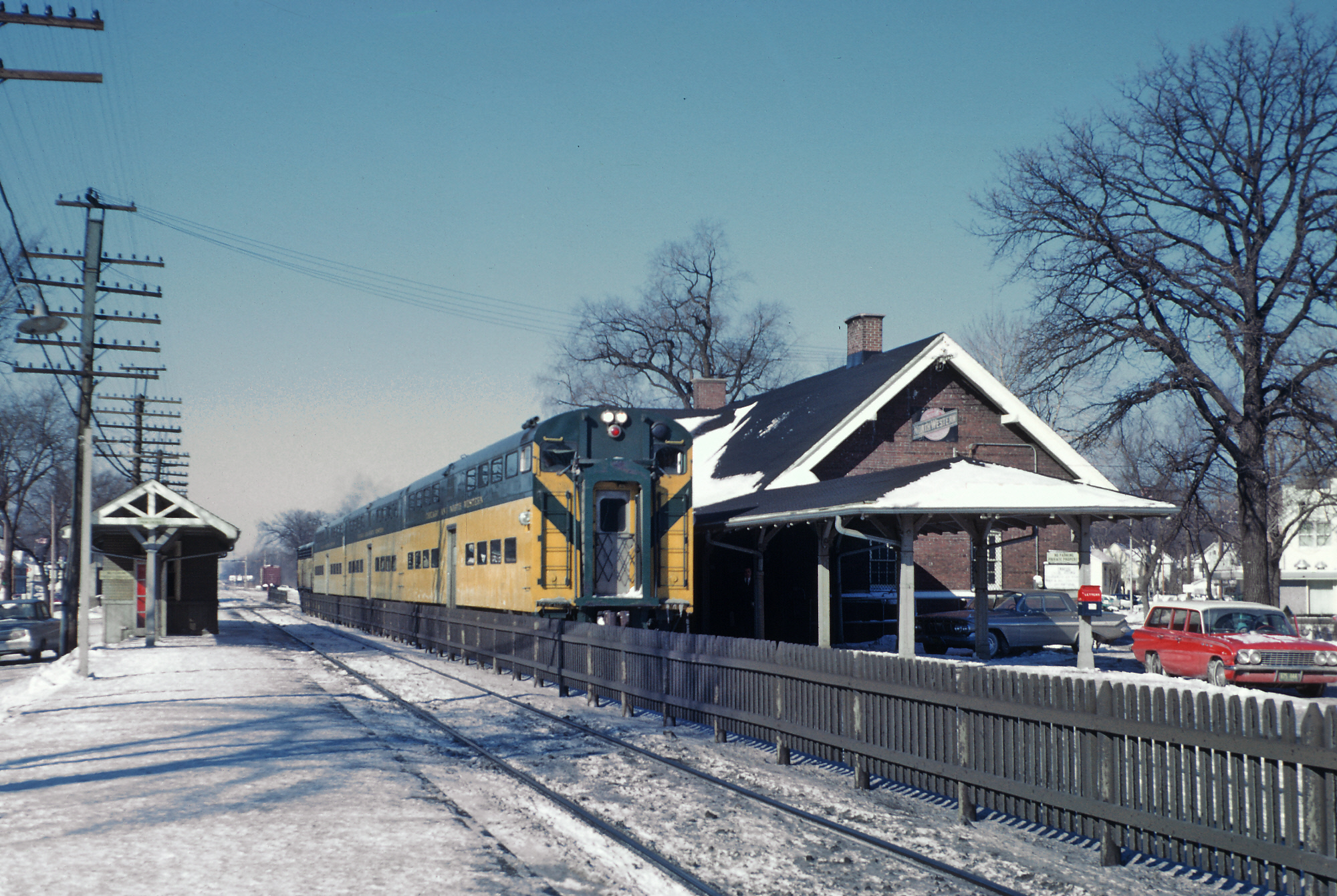
A CNW North Line train stops at Wilmette, Illinois, in 1963.

=== Commuter services ===
When Union Pacific bought out the Chicago and North Western in 1995, it inherited the railroad's Metra commuter rail services in the Chicago metropolitan area: the Union Pacific North Line to Kenosha, Wisconsin, Northwest Line to Harvard, Illinois, and West Line to Geneva, Illinois (which was later extended to Elburn, Illinois in 2006), all of which operate from Ogilvie Transportation Center (the former North Western Station–a name still used by many Chicago residents). In order to ensure uniformity across the Chicago area commuter rail system, trains were branded as Metra services and used Metra equipment. However, Union Pacific crews operated the trains under a purchase-of-service agreement. In 2025, UP transferred the control and operation of its commuter rail services and trains in Chicago to Metra. UP retains ownership, performs maintenance of the right-of-ways of the three former Chicago & North Western lines radiating from Chicago, and continues to oversee dispatching.

=== Former services ===
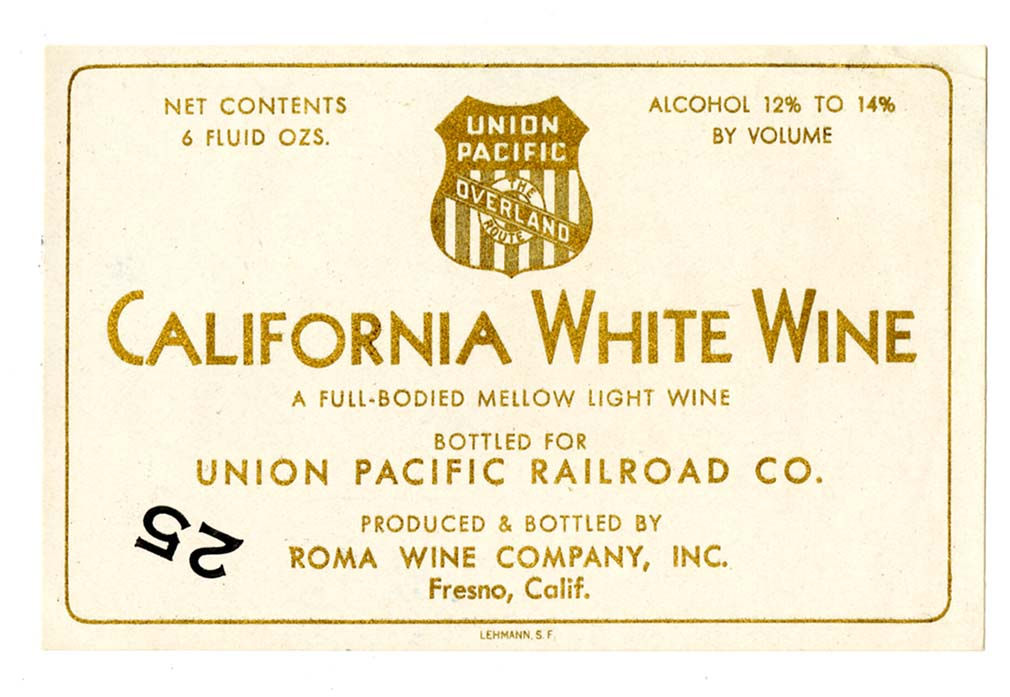
Wine label, Roma Wine Company, bottled for Union Pacific RR circa 1940s

Between 1869 and 1971, Union Pacific operated passenger service throughout its historic "Overland Route". These trains ran between Chicago and Omaha on the Chicago & Northwestern trackage starting in 1936. Disputes over trackage rights and passenger revenues with the C&NW prompted the UP to switch to the Milwaukee Road for the handling of its streamliner trains between Chicago and Omaha beginning in late 1955. The last intercity passenger train operated by UP was the westbound City of Los Angeles, arriving at Los Angeles Union Station on May 2, 1971. Since then, Union Pacific has satisfied its common carrier requirements by hosting Amtrak trains. (Note: Merger partner D&RGW elected not to join Amtrak and continued operating the Rio Grande Zephyr until 1983.)

=== Hosted trains ===
Many Amtrak and commuter rail routes use Union Pacific rails. This list excludes the commuter services the company formerly operated in Chicago (see above).

==== Amtrak ====
- Amtrak Cascades
- California Zephyr
- Capitol Corridor
- Coast Starlight
- Gold Runner
- Lincoln Service
- Missouri River Runner
- Pacific Surfliner
- Sunset Limited
- Texas Eagle

==== Commuter trains ====
- Altamont Corridor Express
- Caltrain
- FrontRunner (Note: This service runs on its own dedicated tracks within a UP right of way.)
- Metrolink
  - Riverside Line
  - Ventura County Line
- RTD commuter rail
  - G Line
- Trinity Railway Express

== Notable accidents and safety ==
=== 21st century ===
- September 4, 2007: a Union Pacific train derailment split the small town of Sergeant Bluff, Iowa. About 16 cars derailed, most carrying salt that spilled into snow-like piles. The derailment interrupted traffic for about two hours.
- June 24, 2012: three crew members died and caused a property damage of $15 million when two Union Pacific trains collided head-on just east of Goodwell, Oklahoma. The eastbound train passed a stop signal on the main track and struck the westbound train in a siding about one mile (1.6 km) east of the meeting point. The NTSB provided the probable causes as eastbound train's operator's vision problems and failure by the conductor to get backup assistance as required. NTSB stated UP did not comply with its own policies when it medically recertified the operator. The company only had six color tests despite the policy requiring a color test for 10 signals.
- November 15, 2012: A UP train struck a parade float in Midland, Texas, killing four and injuring 16 passengers on the parade float.
- May 25, 2013: in Chaffee, Missouri, a Union Pacific train collided with a BNSF train at a level junction, injuring seven, and causing damages exceeding $10 million. The accident caused a Missouri Route M overpass to partially collapse and caused a fire. The investigation concluded the engineer most likely fell asleep, due to sleep apnea. The uncontrolled train violated four progressively more restrictive signals before colliding with the BNSF train at roughly 40 mph (64 km/h). Three months later, the Route M overpass reopened with a new design.
- June 3, 2016: a 96-car oil train derailed in the Columbia River Gorge near Mosier, Oregon. Eleven cars derailed, at least one caught on fire, and 42,000 US gal (160 m^{3}) of Bakken crude oil spilled, some going into the Columbia River. Some 10,000 US gallons (38 m^{3}) were eventually recovered.
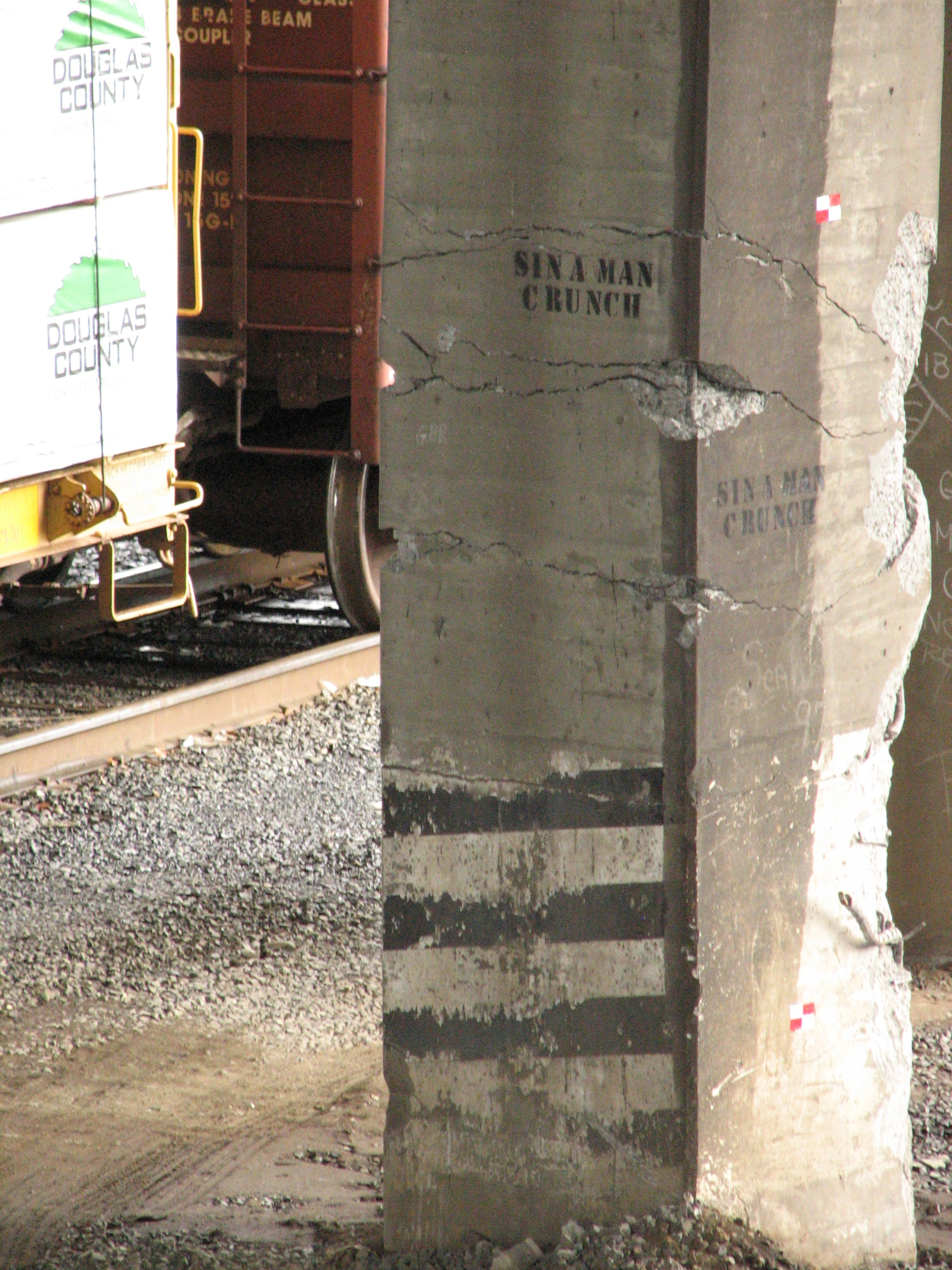
  Support column damaged in September 2019 Portland accident
- Mid-late 2018: the Niland Geyser, a moving mud pot, encroached on the railroad near the eastern shore of the Salton Sea, requiring extensive engineering work to first delay the movement and then build a temporary diversion.
- July 21, 2018: A female Henderson, Colorado pedestrian was struck and killed by UP 844 (a 4-8-4 Northern-type steam locomotive) where it immediately made an emergency stop while on an excursion to Denver. Local authorities reported that the victim was standing on or too close to the tracks trying to take pictures of the oncoming train but simply didn't move out of the way in time. Investigators and the family of the victim both ruled the death as accidental.
- September 7, 2019: a Union Pacific train of two locomotives and three tank cars carrying liquefied petroleum gas derailed and crashed into an overpass support column at the Albina Yard in Portland, Oregon. The support column is for the eastbound lanes of the six-lane Going Street overpass, which is the only public access to the major industrial area Swan Island for cars and trucks. Four lanes were left unsafe after the derailment. Two of six lanes remain closed as of November 14, 2019. The cause of the crash was broken rails. There was nobody on board the train which was remotely operated at the time of crash. In May 2020, another Union Pacific derailment damaged a different overpass which The Skanner described as an ongoing safety concern.
- March 21, 2022: A Union Pacific freight train derailed and fell from a viaduct in Colton, California.
- September 2023: The railroad furloughed 138 workers, a small fraction of its 50,000 employees, but enough to cause a reprimand from the Federal Railroad Administration (FRA) that indicated its inspection of UP trains determined the rates of defects in locomotives and cars was double the national average, which the FRA said, was caused by a dearth of personnel.
- December 18, 2024: A Union Pacific intermodal train crashed into a semi-truck that was hauling an oversize load in Pecos, Texas, resulting in all four locomotives and multiple double-stack freight cars derailing, including three cars that were carrying potentially hazardous materials (lithium-ion batteries and airbags), but none were released. Leaked diesel fuel was also contained. The Pecos Chamber of Commerce was also damaged as it was hit by the train during the derailment. Both Union Pacific crew members onboard the leading locomotive were killed and 3 others were injured. The NTSB is currently investigating this accident.
- May 18, 2025: At about 11 p.m. CDT in Kiowa County, Kansas, an EF-3 tornado overturned about 100 double-stack cars on a Union Pacific intermodal train that was stopped about two miles west of Haviland due to the dangerous weather. The railroad confirmed that there were no casualties and no hazardous materials were released.

==== San Antonio area ====
On June 28, 2004, a UP train collided with an idle BNSF train in a San Antonio suburb. In the course of the derailment, a 90-ton tank car carrying liquified chlorine was punctured. As the chlorine vaporized, a toxic "yellow cloud" formed, killing three and causing 43 hospitalizations. The costs of cleanup and property damaged during the incident exceeded $7 million.

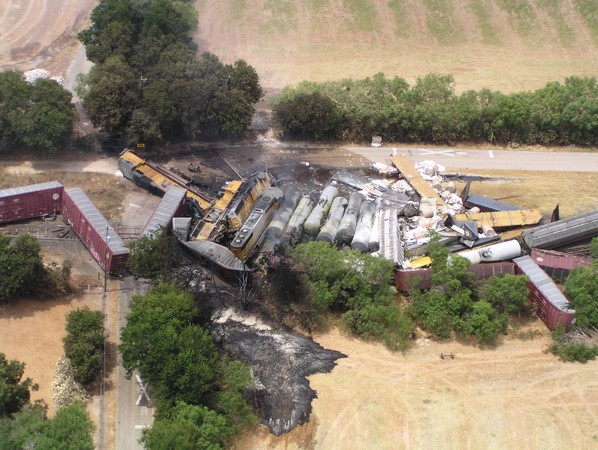
Deadly derailment in Macdona, Texas, on June 28, 2004

Investigations of the Macdona incident revealed several serious safety lapses on the part of the Union Pacific and its employees, including employees not following the company's own safety rules. While the immediate cause of the derailment was the UP crew's "fatigue", chlorine tank cars had been improperly placed near the front of the train, a danger in the case of derailment.

The Macdona incident was not the first derailment in the San Antonio area. Between May and November 1994, Union Pacific trains derailed five times, killing at least 4 people. Between June 2004 and March 2005, 10 trains derailed, killing as many people.

In the aftermath of Macdona, the Federal Railroad Administration signed a compliance agreement with the railroad in which the railroad promised to rectify the "notable deficiencies" that regulators found. But the relative impunity UP seemed to exhibit regarding the derailment led to suggestions that the FRA was far "too cozy ... to the railroads". In March 2005, Texas Governor Rick Perry supported a plan to reroute trains around large urban population centers in Texas, including San Antonio, but such a plan was purely voluntary and had no timetable associated.

Trains have continued to derail in the area including an incident in June 2009 where tank cars containing chlorine and petroleum naptha xylene derailed, but did not spill.

== Community responsibility ==
=== Transient camp and graffiti issues ===
The City of San Jose, California, threatened Union Pacific with a lawsuit in 2019 after years of complaints about transient and graffiti blight going unaddressed. For the first time in many years, Union Pacific cleaned out along the tracks starting in November 2019. San Jose Councilman Sergio Jimenez said "The reality is that Union Pacific has not been a good neighbor".

San Jose's mayor Sam Liccardo said

"At any given conference of mayors, you won't hear anyone expressing confidence that Union Pacific will respond nimbly or collaboratively," and "But we are hopeful that the (memorandum of understanding) will turn a page on Union Pacific's behavior in the past to enable a more collaborative relationship going forward."

The Mercury News reports that company has been uncooperative and non responsive to working together, such as failing to come through with graffiti abatement as Union Pacific had promised the city.

=== 2022 Utah legislative action ===
In 2022, legislators in Utah brought forth two separate bills specifically aimed at Union Pacific. The first, HB181, was raised after some municipalities encountered resistance from Union Pacific when attempting to upgrade rail crossings. In Logan, Utah, Union Pacific altered a construction agreement to require the city to pay maintenance fees in perpetuity for an upgraded crossing, a mandate which was against state code. The proposed legislation would make it easier for municipalities to get crossing improvements approved, and clarifies which party must pay associated maintenance costs. HB181 was ultimately passed.

== Environmental record ==
In Eugene, Oregon, where pollution from a century-old rail yard has been seeping into groundwater, the UP and the Oregon Department of Environmental Quality launched a study of ground contamination in 2008. The pollutants are mostly petroleum hydrocarbons, industrial solvents, and metals.

In 2007, Union Pacific Railroad worked with the US EPA to develop a way to reduce locomotive exhaust emissions. They discovered that adding an oxidation catalyst filtering canister to the diesel engine's exhaust manifold and using ultra-low-sulfur diesel fuel would reduce particulate emissions by about half, unburned hydrocarbons by 38 percent, and carbon monoxide by 82 percent.

The company's Fuel Master program rewards locomotive engineers who save the most fuel each month. The program has saved the company millions of dollars, much of which has been returned to the engineers. In 2006, the program's founder, Wayne Kennedy, received the John H. Chafee Environmental Award, and the program was recognized by Transportation Secretary Norman Mineta.

In January 2018, a former waste water operator at Union Pacific Albina Yard in Portland, Oregon, employed by the railroad's contractor Mott MacDonald negligently released thousands of gallons of oil into the environment. The operator was distracted by a cell phone and allowed the tank to overflow for over an hour. An engineering firm hired by Union Pacific estimates 1,800 U.S. Gallons (6,813.741 L) of it was released into nearby Willamette River, not including the spill that was captured by the containment booms. Employees of United States Environmental Protection Agency who were working at facilities nearby placed booms to contain the oil spill. Federal prosecutors have charged the operator Robert LaRue Webb II with violation of the Clean Water Act for releasing the oil into the environment. Webb pleaded guilty in August 2019, and was sentenced to two years probation and a $2,500 fine.

In 2016, the Union Pacific Railroad Co. was named as a defendant in a lawsuit seeking cleanup of a contaminated rail yard site that operated in Lafayette, Louisiana, from the late 1800s until the 1960s.

In 2020, Houston residents living near a Union Pacific Railroad Company rail yard filed lawsuits against the Union Pacific. These lawsuits followed the finding by the State of Texas of a higher-than-expected incidence of certain cancers in residents living close to the yard. A State of Texas report released in 2021 identified an additional cancer cluster of lymphoblastic leukemia in children.

In 2022, the state of Utah proposed bill, HB405, which would have required Union Pacific to replace their aging fleet of Tier 0 switching locomotives with hydrogen or electric engines by 2028, due to Utah having very poor air quality in winter months. According to Utah state Rep. Schultz, Union Pacific was uncooperative on the switching locomotive bill if Utah did not drop the railroad crossings bill. HB405 was dropped after Union Pacific made voluntary commitments to replace several tier 0 switching locomotives with less polluting tier 2 locomotives, as well as to test some all electric ones in the Utah Roper Rail Yard.

Wabtec is modernizing 600 older Union Pacific locomotives over a three-year period through 2025. The modernizations will improve fuel efficiency and reliability of these locomotives while also reducing emissions.

== Equipment Management Pool ==
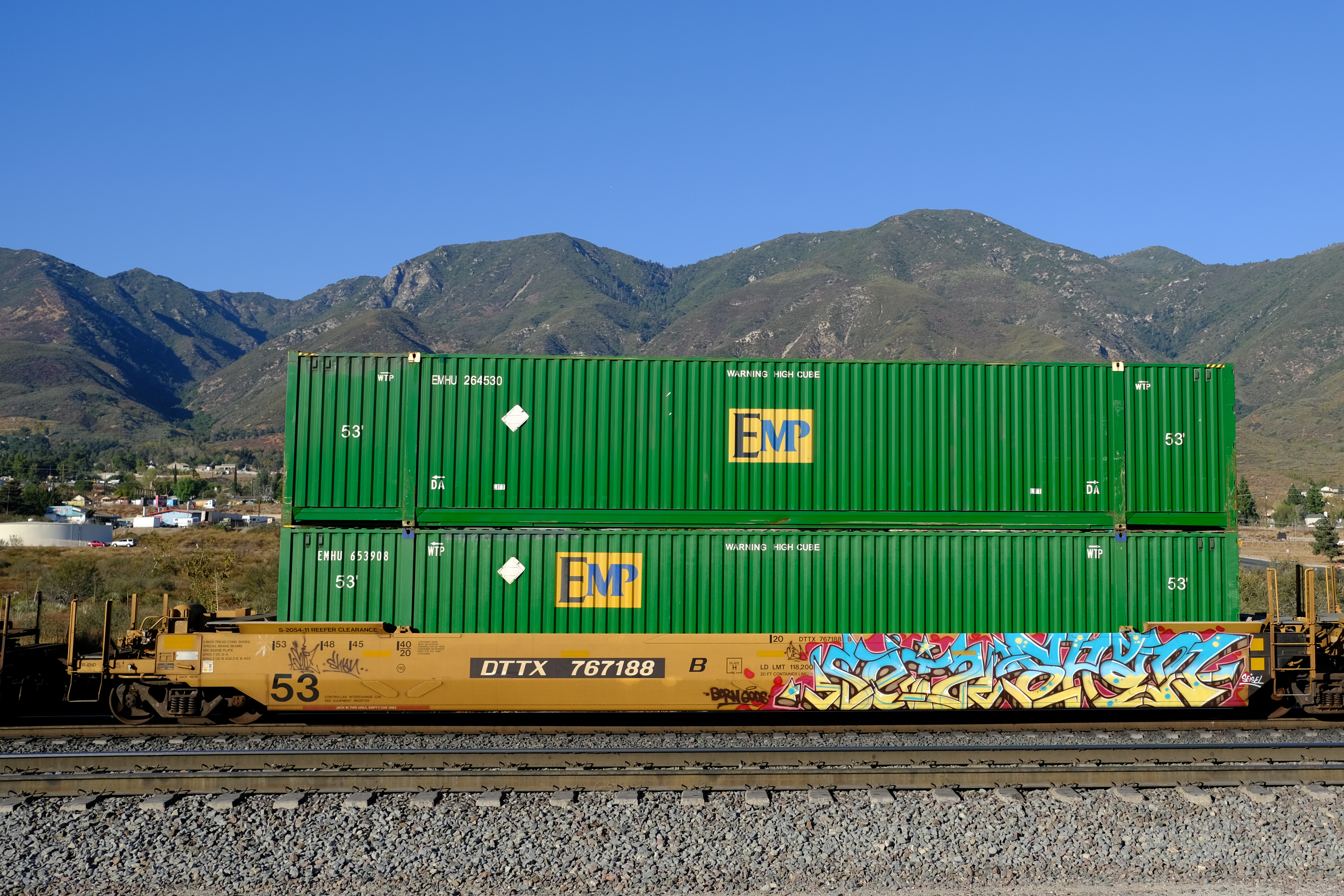
53 foot EMP containers in a well car

Union Pacific and Norfolk Southern are the largest owner-partners of Equipment Management Pool, a domestic freight interline intermodal freight transport service that rents and moves more than 35,000 53-foot containers and chassis throughout North America. Other partners in the freight company include Canadian National Railway, I&M Rail Link, Iowa Interstate Railroad, and Wisconsin Central Ltd. In 2022, the Canadian Pacific Railway, one year prior to its merger with the Kansas City Southern Railway, was dropped from the pool, leaving CN as the only Canadian member.

== Union Pacific Railroad Museum ==
The Union Pacific Railroad Museum is a former Carnegie library in Council Bluffs, Iowa, that houses artifacts, photographs, and documents that trace the development of the railroad and the American West. The company pays upkeep on the privately owned building, which houses part of Union Pacific's corporate collection, one of the oldest in the United States. Holdings include weapons from the late 19th and 20th centuries, outlaw paraphernalia, a sampling of the immigrants' possessions, and a photograph collection comprising more than 500,000 images.

== See also ==
- Central Pacific Railroad
- Chicago and North Western Railway
- First transcontinental railroad
- Hell on Wheels (TV series involving Union Pacific set in 1865)
- History of rail transportation in California
- Los Angeles and Salt Lake Railroad
- Missouri–Kansas–Texas Railroad
- Missouri Pacific Railroad
- Oregon Railroad and Navigation Company
- Oregon Short Line
- Pacific Fruit Express
- Railex
- Southern Pacific Railroad
- Western Pacific Railroad
