= TR class =

TR class may refer to:

- New Zealand TR class locomotive, diesel-mechanical/hydraulic shunting locomotives
- TasRail TR class, diesel-electric locomotives
