= Progress Rail PR30C =

Type and origin
- Power type: Diesel-electric
- Builder: Progress Rail
Specifications
- Configuration
  - AAR: C-C
- Gauge: 4 ft 8 1/2 in (1,435 mm)
- Prime mover: Caterpillar 3516
- Cylinders: V16
Performance figures
- Power output: 3,005 hp (2,240 kW)

The Progress Rail PR30C is a 3,005 hp (2,240 kW) C-C diesel-electric locomotive rebuilt by Progress Rail. It is the result of a conversion to an existing EMD SD40-2-type locomotive. This involves replacing the existing prime mover with an EPA Tier-II-compliant turbocharged V16 Caterpillar 3516. The prime mover is equipped with an additional exhaust treatment system, in a large box mounted at hood top level, in front of the radiator section.

At least six SD40-2s are scheduled for this rebuild, of which five have been completed and entered revenue freight service as of July 2010. The first units were introduced into service by Union Pacific in California in January 2010. They have been assigned to mainline freight operations in the southern part of the state between Long Beach and West Colton.

An additional PR30C operates as a demonstrator for Progress Rail.

This conversion alters the external appearance of the locomotive; in addition to the addition of the large exhaust treatment box, the radiator section is replaced with one similar in appearance to that of an EMD SD70ACe.
