= Lincoln Industries =

Lincoln Industries Corp.
- Type: Subsidiary
- Industry: Railroad
- Founded: 1985; 41 years ago, in Louisville, Kentucky, United States
- Fate: Acquired by Progress Rail Services Corporation 1998-01-08
- Headquarters: Louisville, Kentucky, United States
- Area served: North America
- Key people: Mark A. Clinton (vice president - Sales & Operations)
- Products: X4 Sectional L.E.D. Light Unit; 4-Post Wayside Signal Cantilevers; Slide Safety Ladder
- Services: Repair; Leasing; Design; Installation
- Parent: Progress Rail Services Corporation
- Website: lincoln-industries.com

Lincoln Industries Corp., also known as Progress Rail Services Corporation - Signals Division, manufactures railroad signal products sold to customers throughout North America. Founded in 1985, Lincoln Industries has been part of Caterpillar Inc. as a subsidiary of Progress Rail Services Corporation since January 8, 1998 and is organized under Progress Rail's Engineering and Track Services (ETS) group. Lincoln Industries maintains a headquarters and manufacturing facility in Louisville, Kentucky, a manufacturing facility in Jacksonville, Florida and has access to Progress Rail facilities throughout North America for staging materials.

== Products ==
Lincoln Industries manufactures railroad/highway grade crossing safety warning devices, various signaling devices, and railroad right-of-way maintenance and rail-handling equipment.

== Services ==
Lincoln Industries repairs and leases railroad right-of-way maintenance and rail-handling equipment.
