= Progress Rail =

American railroad products company

Progress Rail Services Corporation
- Type: Subsidiary
- Industry: Transportation
- Founded: 1982; 44 years ago, in Albertville, Alabama, United States
- Founder: Billy Ainsworth
- Headquarters: Albertville, Alabama, United States
- Number of locations: United States - 110; Mexico - 28; Australia - 23; UK - 5 Canada - 4 Brazil - 2 Italy - 1 Germany - 1
- Area served: Worldwide
- Key people: John Newman (CEO)
- Products: List: Remanufactured locomotives and railcars; Rail and other track materials; Special trackwork; Signals and communication products; Rail welding equipment; Remanufactured trackwork components; Railroad MOW equipment; Vegetation control equipment
- Services: List: Rail and other track material sorting; Track removal; Signal and communication design, installation and maintenance; Mobile welding; Equipment financing, leasing and rental; Locomotive and railcar repair and refurbishment; Recycling
- Number of employees: 8,000+
- Parent: Caterpillar Inc.
- Divisions: Infrastructure; Rolling Stock
- Subsidiaries: List: Electro-Motive Diesel; Lincoln Industries; MGE – Equipamentos e Servicos Ferroviarios Ltda.; Progress Rail Leasing Corporation; Progress Rail Inspection & Information Systems Srl & GmbH
- Website: progressrail.com

Progress Rail Services Corporation (reporting mark PRLX), a fully owned subsidiary of Caterpillar since 2006, is a supplier of railroad and transit system products and services headquartered in Albertville, Alabama. Founded as a recycling company in 1982, Progress Rail has increased the number of its product and service offerings over time to become one of the largest integrated and diversified suppliers of railroad and transit system products and services in North America.

Progress Rail markets products and services worldwide, maintaining 110 facilities in the United States, 34 in Mexico, 23 in Australia, five in the UK, four in Canada, two in Brazil, and one in Italy and Germany. Progress Rail is organized into two divisions: Infrastructure and Rolling Stock.

== History ==
"Progress Rail" traces its roots to a recycling company founded in Albertville, Alabama, United States, in 1982. With the merger of Progress Rail's owner Florida Progress Corporation and Carolina Power & Light Company in 2000, it became owned by the new entity Progress Energy.

Former logo

In February 2005, Progress Energy announced it was selling Progress Rail to One Equity Partners for $405 million. The sale closed on March 28, 2005, with Progress Rail becoming a separate private company.

On May 17, 2006, Caterpillar Inc. announced it would purchase Progress Rail from One Equity Partners for $1 billion in cash, stock and debt. The acquisition by Caterpillar was announced as part of its long-term strategy, Vision 2020.

In July 2011, the company announced it was to assemble EMD locomotives at a plant leased in the state of Minas Gerais, Brazil.

== Acquisitions ==
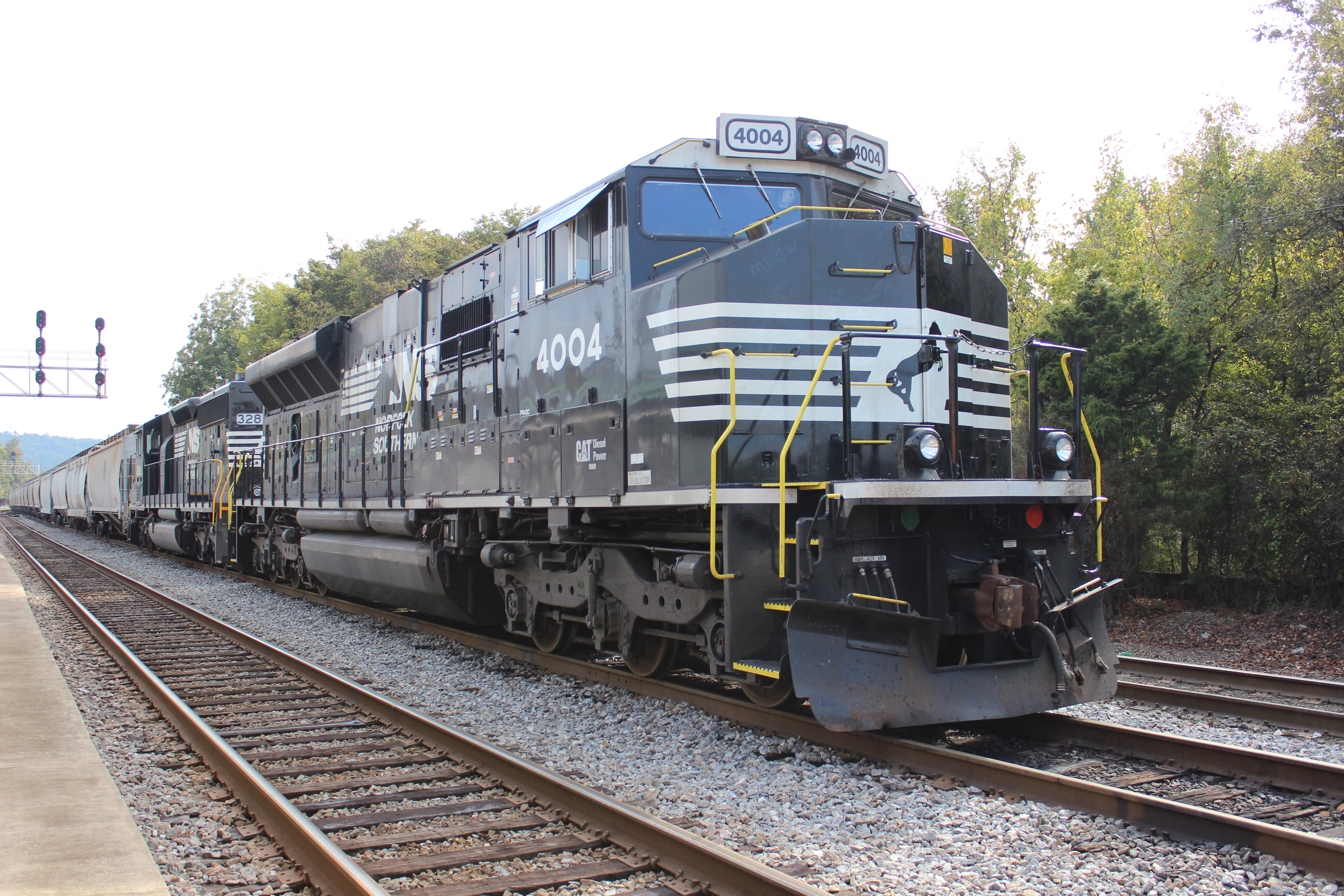
Progress Rail PR43C locomotive at Anniston, Alabama

On May 24, 2008, Caterpillar agreed to acquire all of the capital stock of MGE - Equipamentos e Serviços Ferroviários Ltda., a São Paulo, Brazil–based locomotive component and transit car services company, to become part of Caterpillar's Progress Rail Services Corporation. The acquisition of MGE marked Progress Rail's first entry into the South American market.

On June 1, 2010, Caterpillar announced Progress Rail would buy Electro-Motive Diesel from Berkshire Partners LLC and Greenbriar Equity Group LLC for US$820 million. The purchase was completed on August 2, 2010, making Electro-Motive Diesel a wholly owned subsidiary of Progress Rail Services Corporation.

During 2010, Progress Rail acquired two makers of signal equipment, Coast to Coast Signal Engineering and C&S Signaling, as well as a General Electric subsidiary involved in the signal industry; now Progress Rail Inspection & Information Systems.

In February 2012 Progress Rail permanently closed the EMD London, Ontario, plant after labour dispute shuttered the manufacturing plant. In 2019, Progress Rail acquired Cleveland Track Material, Inc. which was a subsidiary of Vossloh Cogifer.

== Federal legal matters ==
During October 2013, Caterpillar announced that a federal criminal indictment had been secured against Progress Rail Services. In 2017, the company pleaded guilty to the charges, including dumping parts into the ocean. A $5,000,000 fine was paid as well as $20,000,000 in restitution.

== Products ==
=== Locomotives ===
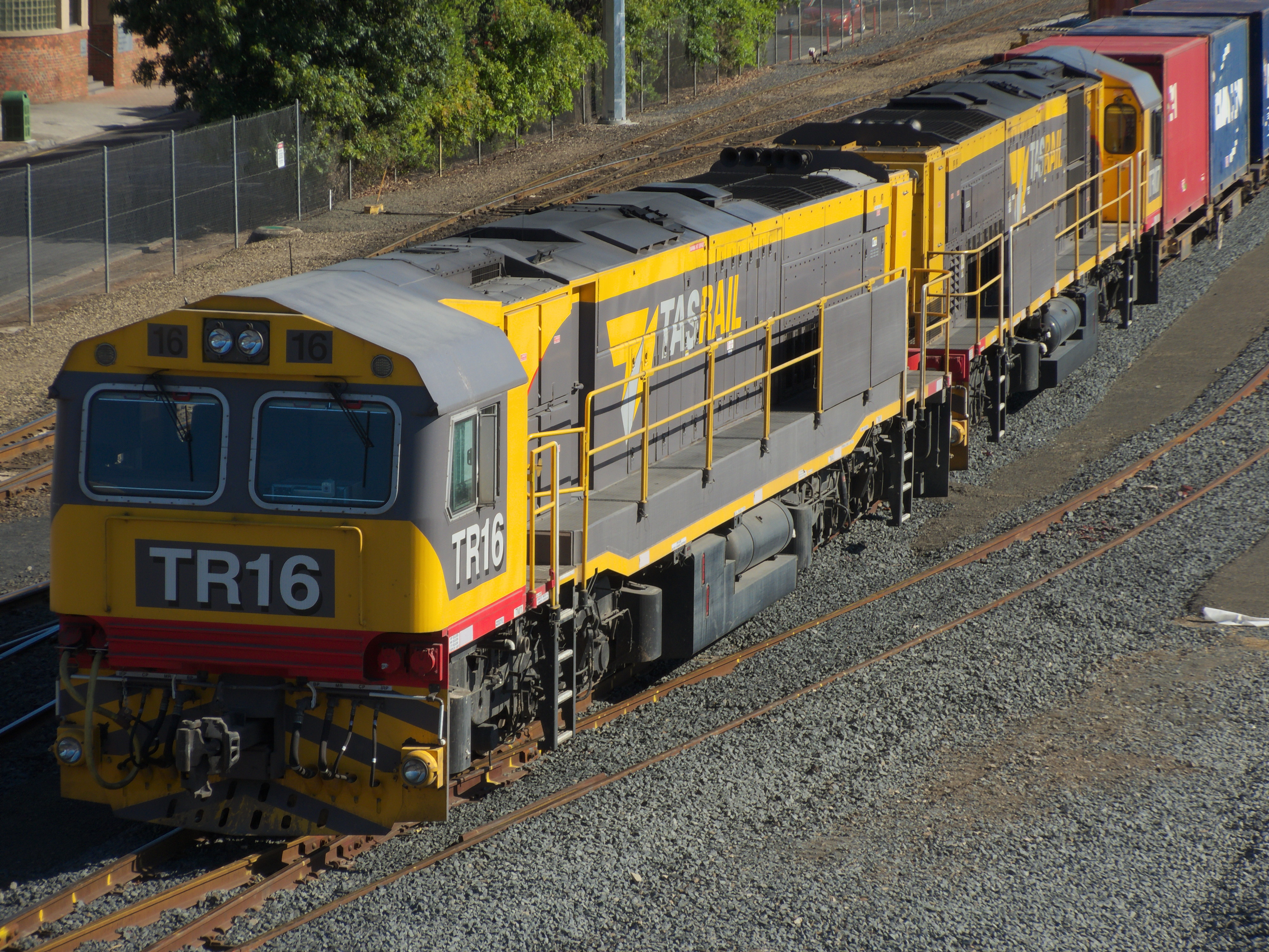
Progress Rail PR22L locomotives, operated by TasRail in Tasmania

Progress Rail currently offers EMD freight, passenger, repowered and used locomotives.

- Progress Rail PR22L
- Progress Rail PR30C
- Progress Rail PR43C

=== Signals ===
Progress Rail's Signal Division makes grade crossing and wayside signals.
