= TasRail TR class =

Class of Australian diesel-electric locomotives

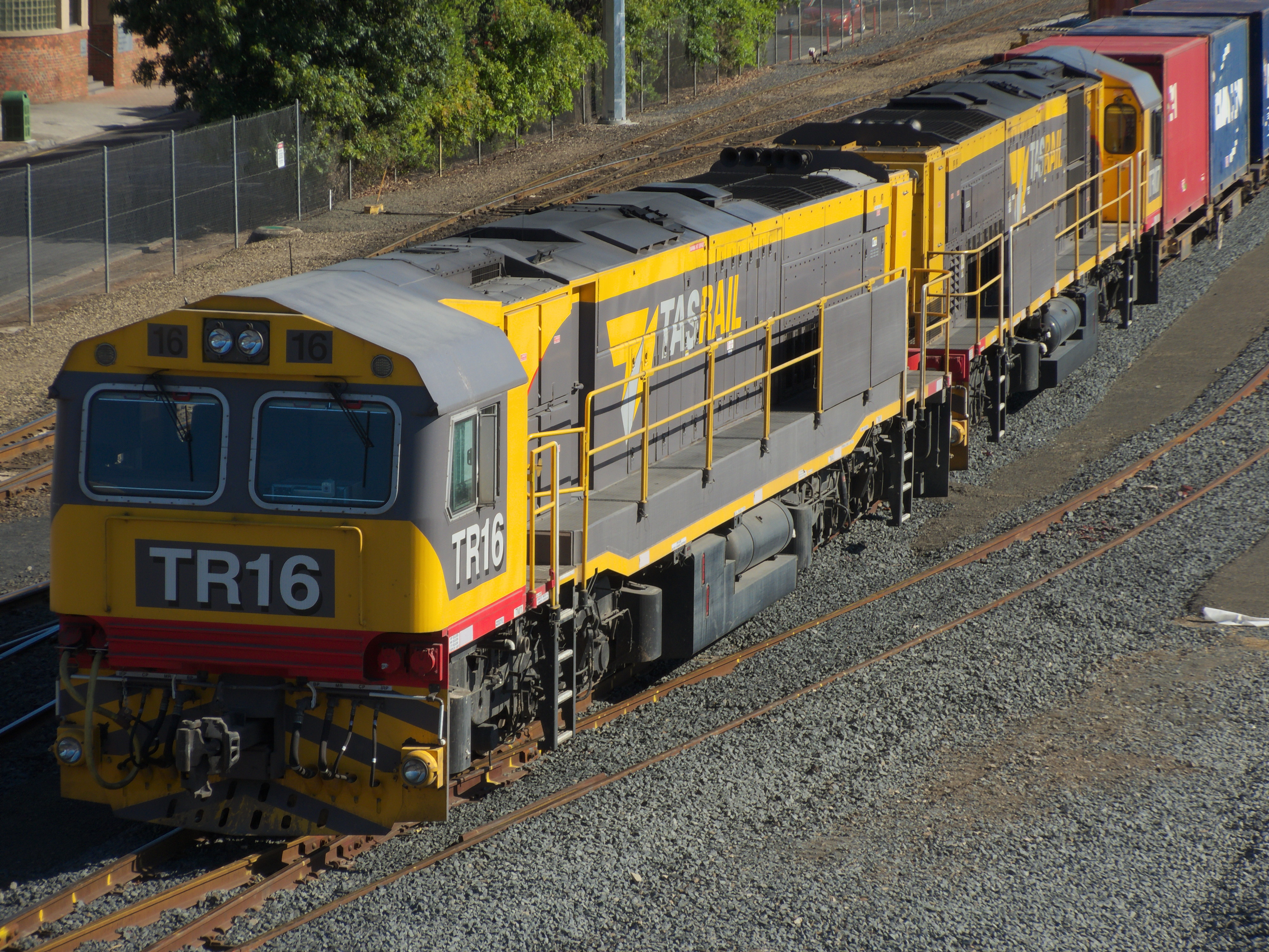
Type and origin
- Power type: Diesel-electric
- Builder: Progress Rail, Patterson, Georgia
- Model: PR22L
- Build date: 2013–2014
- Total produced: 17
Specifications
- Configuration
  - UIC: Co-Co
- Gauge: 1,067 mm (3 ft 6 in)
- Bogies: EMD GHC
- Wheelbase: 13,610 mm (44 ft 8 in) total, 3,632 mm (11 ft 11.0 in) bogie
- Length: 16,925 mm (55 ft 6.3 in) over headstocks
- Width: 2,900 mm (9 ft 6 in)
- Height: 3,840 mm (12 ft 7 in)
- Axle load: 18 tonnes (17.7 long tons; 19.8 short tons)
- Loco weight: 108 tonnes (106.3 long tons; 119.0 short tons)
- Fuel type: Diesel
- Lubricant cap.: 151.4 L (33.3 imp gal)
- Prime mover: Caterpillar 3512C HD
- RPM range: 1900rpm max
- Engine type: Four stroke
- Aspiration: Turbocharged, intercooled
- Displacement: 58.6 litres (3,576.0 in^{3})
- Alternator: Kato
- Traction motors: Electro-Motive Diesel D-43
- Cylinders: V12
- Cylinder size: 170 mm × 215 mm (6.7 in × 8.5 in)
- MU working: 74V, 8 notch
- Loco brake: Air, dynamic
- Train brakes: Air
Performance figures
- Maximum speed: 100 kilometres per hour (62 mph)
- Power output: 1,700 kW (2,280 hp) gross, 1,492 kW (2,001 hp) net
- Tractive effort: 272 kN (61,148.0 lbf)
Career
- Operators: TasRail
- Number in class: 17
- Numbers: TR01–TR17
- First run: November 2013
- Current owner: TasRail
- Disposition: All in service

The TR class are a class of diesel locomotives built by Progress Rail, Patterson, Georgia, United States for TasRail in 2013–2014. They are currently the main Tasmanian locomotive class handling the majority of mainline services across the state.

== History ==
In December 2011, TasRail awarded Progress Rail a contract for 17 PR22L locomotives. They were the first new locomotives delivered to Tasmania since the Za class in 1976. The first TR class were delivered in November 2013 with the balance delivered in 2014.
